= List of World Rallycross Championship drivers =

Rallycross Champions

The following list of World Rallycross Championship drivers lists the 158 drivers who have entered or taken part in a World Championship rallycross event since the series' inception in 2014.

== Drivers ==
Information below is correct up to and including the 2018 World RX of Norway.

Name	Nationality	Debut	Entries	Heat wins	Semi-Final appearance	Final wins	Podiums	Championships
Per-Gunnar Andersson	Sweden	9. Germany 2014	13	0	2	0	0	0
Emmanuel Anne	France	46. France 2017	1	0	0	0	0	0
Rodolphe Audran	France	8. France 2014	1	0	0	0	0	0
Andreas Bakkerud	Norway	1. Portugal 2014	54	17	10	6	21	0
Miguel Baldoni	Argentina	12. Argentina 2014	1	0	0	0	0	0
Martial Barbette	France	8. France 2014	1	0	0	0	0	0
Mário Barbosa	Portugal	13. Portugal 2015	2	0	0	0	0	0
Jānis Baumanis	Latvia	16. Great Britain 2015	32	2	0	0	0	0
Oliver Bennett	United Kingdom	42. Great Britain 2017	5	0	0	0	0	0
Morten Bergminrud	Norway	3. Norway 2014	3	0	0	0	0	0
Christian Beroujon	France	8. France 2014	1	0	0	0	0	0
David Binks	United Kingdom	8. France 2014	2	0	0	0	0	0
Ken Block	United States	3. Norway 2014	27	0	0	0	2	0
Laurent Bouliou	France	8. France 2014	4	0	0	0	0	0
Christoph Brugger	Austria	19. Canada 2015	2	0	0	0	0	0
Thomas Bryntesson	Norway	25. Argentina 2015	1	0	0	0	0	0
Patrick Carpentier	Canada	7. Canada 2014	2	0	0	0	0	0
Fabien Chanoine	France	21. France 2015	2	0	0	0	0	0
Guerlain Chicherit	France	21. France 2015	16	0	0	0	0	0
Jochen Coox	Belgium	2. Great Britain 2014	2	0	0	0	0	0
Mark Cronje	South Africa	49. South Africa 2017	1	0	0	0	0	0
Csucsu	Hungary	38. Barcelona 2017	12	0	0	0	0	0
Alx Danielsson	Sweden	13. Portugal 2015	10	0	0	0	0	0
Grégoire Demoustier	France	38. Barcelona 2017	12	0	0	0	0	0
Dieter Depping	Germany	48. Germany 2017	1	0	0	0	0	0
Liam Doran	United Kingdom	1. Portugal 2014	25	3	1	0	0	0
Jean-Baptiste Dubourg	France	8. France 2014	16	0	0	0	1	0
Louis-Philippe Dumoulin	Canada	19. Canada 2015	1	0	0	0	0	0
François Duval	Belgium	6. Belgium 2014	6	0	0	0	0	0
Per Eklund	Sweden	9. Germany 2014	2	0	0	0	0	0
Mattias Ekström	Sweden	3. Norway 2014	42	24	12	10	17	1 (2016)
Lars Øivind Enerberg	Norway	11. Turkey 2014	1	0	0	0	0	0
Kevin Eriksson	Sweden	12. Argentina 2014	29	0	0	1	2	0
Oliver Eriksson	Sweden	44. Sweden 2017	2	0	0	0	0	0
Sebastian Eriksson	Sweden	5. Sweden 2014	3	0	1	0	0	0
Eric Färén	Sweden	2. Great Britain 2014	3	0	0	0	0	0
Mark Flaherty	United Kingdom	22. Barcelona 2015	1	0	0	0	0	0
Tanner Foust	United States	2. Great Britain 2014	10	1	1	1	2	0
Gilles Franco	France	21. France 2015	1	0	0	0	0	0
Gigi Galli	Italy	10. Italy 2014	4	0	0	0	0	0
Christian Giarolo	Italy	10. Italy 2014	1	0	0	0	0	0
Julian Godfrey	United Kingdom	2. Great Britain 2014	3	0	0	0	0	0
Richard Göransson	Sweden	10. Italy 2014	3	0	0	0	1	0
Niclas Grönholm	Finland	18. Sweden 2015	29	0	0	0	0	0
Jérôme Grosset-Janin	France	2. Great Britain 2014	12	0	0	0	0	0
Patrick Guillerme	France	8. France 2014	2	0	0	0	0	0
Ole Håbjørg	Norway	3. Norway 2014	3	0	0	0	0	0
Ashley Haigh-Smith	South Africa	49. South Africa 2017	1	0	0	0	0	0
Kevin Hansen	Sweden	25. Argentina 2015	23	0	0	0	0	0
Timmy Hansen	Sweden	1. Portugal 2014	54	35	14	5	23	0
Stian Haugan	Norway	5. Sweden 2014	1	0	0	0	0	0
Peter Hedström	Sweden	2. Great Britain 2014	8	0	0	0	0	0
Toomas Heikkinen	Finland	1. Portugal 2014	49	7	4	2	8	0
Mark Higgins	United Kingdom	53. Great Britain 2018	1	0	0	0	0	0
Frode Holte	Norway	2. Great Britain 2014	5	0	0	0	0	0
Daniel Holten	Norway	3. Norway 2014	4	0	0	0	0	0
Åke Holtet	Norway	3. Norway 2014	1	0	0	0	0	0
Ludvig Hunsbedt	Norway	5. Sweden 2014	1	0	0	0	0	0
Alexander Hvaal	Norway	1. Portugal 2014	9	0	0	0	0	0
Sverre Isachsen	Norway	7. Canada 2014	1	0	0	0	0	0
Jos Jansen	Belgium	1. Portugal 2014	12	0	0	0	0	0
Davy Jeanney	France	2. Great Britain 2014	31	3	2	2	3	0
Stein Egil Jenssen	Norway	3. Norway 2014	2	0	0	0	0	0
Jörg Jockel	Germany	9. Germany 2014	1	0	0	0	0	0
Nick Jones	United Kingdom	37. Argentina 2016	1	0	0	0	0	0
Andrew Jordan	United Kingdom	2. Great Britain 2014	5	1	0	0	1	0
Christophe Jouet	France	22. Barcelona 2015	1	0	0	0	0	0
Martin Kaczmarski	Poland	39. Portugal 2017	5	0	0	0	0	0
Tamás Kárai	Hungary	10. Italy 2014	6	0	0	0	0	0
Nabil Karam	Lebanon	8. France 2014	2	0	0	0	0	0
Ramona Karlsson	Sweden	1. Portugal 2014	6	0	0	0	0	0
Aki Karttunen	Finland	4. Finland 2014	1	0	0	0	0	0
Knapick	France	8. France 2014	11	0	0	0	0	0
Pavel Koutný	Czechia	2. Great Britain 2014	4	0	0	0	0	0
Johan Kristoffersson	Sweden	5. Sweden 2014	86	78	64	42	58	6 (2017-2018-2020-2021-2022-2023)
Tore Kristoffersson	Norway	3. Norway 2014	3	0	0	0	0	0
Marc Laboulle	France	8. France 2014	3	0	0	0	0	0
Kjetil Larsen	Norway	54. Norway 2018	1	0	0	0	0	0
Robin Larsson	Sweden	2. Great Britain 2014	37	1	2	1	5	0
Yann Le Jossec	France	33. France 2016	1	0	0	0	0	0
Pascal Le Nouvel	France	8. France 2014	2	0	0	0	0	0
Janno Ligur	Estonia	35. Latvia 2016	1	0	0	0	0	0
Guttorm Lindefjell	Norway	9. Germany 2014	2	0	0	0	0	0
Tord Linnerud	Norway	2. Great Britain 2014	19	0	0	0	0	0
Sébastien Loeb	France	26. Portugal 2016	29	8	4	2	14	0
Bohdan Ludwiczak	Poland	1. Portugal 2014	7	0	0	0	0	0
Qing-Hua Ma	China	53. Great Britain 2018	1	0	0	0	0	0
Atro Määttä	Finland	4. Finland 2014	1	0	0	0	0	0
Philippe Maloigne	France	33. France 2016	1	0	0	0	0	0
Anton Marklund	Sweden	1. Portugal 2014	39	3	1	0	1	0
Alister McRae	United Kingdom	46. France 2017	1	0	0	0	0	0
M.D.K.	Belgium	6. Belgium 2014	5	0	0	0	0	0
Dave Mirra	United States	14. Hockenheim 2015	1	0	0	0	0	0
Gianni Morbidelli	Italy	24. Italy 2015	2	0	0	0	0	0
Attila Mozer	Hungary	10. Italy 2014	1	0	0	0	0	0
Yvan Muller	France	21. France 2015	1	0	0	0	0	0
Nico Müller	Switzerland	46. France 2017	2	0	0	0	0	0
René Münnich	Germany	5. Sweden 2014	34	0	0	0	0	0
Nerijus Naujokaitis	Lithuania	35. Latvia 2016	1	0	0	0	0	0
Reinis Nitišs	Latvia	1. Portugal 2014	48	5	6	1	7	0
Ole-Kristian Nøttveit	Norway	3. Norway 2014	3	0	0	0	0	0
Oliver O'Donovan	Ireland	2. Great Britain 2014	6	0	0	0	0	0
Emil Öhman	Sweden	2. Great Britain 2014	4	0	0	0	0	0
Mats Öhman	Sweden	2. Great Britain 2014	4	0	0	0	0	0
Sten Oja	Estonia	7. Canada 2014	2	0	0	0	0	0
David Olivier	France	21. France 2015	1	0	0	0	0	0
Andri Õun	Estonia	4. Finland 2014	1	0	0	0	0	0
Fabien Pailler	France	2. Great Britain 2014	3	0	0	0	0	0
Jean-Luc Pailler	France	2. Great Britain 2014	1	0	0	0	0	0
Jonathan Pailler	France	8. France 2014	2	0	0	0	0	0
Teemu Patsi	Finland	4. Finland 2014	2	0	0	0	0	0
Koen Pauwels	Belgium	1. Portugal 2014	7	0	0	0	0	0
Kevin Procter	United Kingdom	8. France 2014	2	0	0	0	0	0
Max Pucher	Austria	13. Portugal 2015	13	0	0	0	0	0
Joni-Pekka Rajala	Finland	4. Finland 2014	7	0	0	0	0	0
Cyril Raymond	France	36. Germany 2016	1	0	0	0	0	0
Valdur Reinsalu	Estonia	4. Finland 2014	1	0	0	0	0	0
Simone Romagna	Italy	8. France 2014	3	0	0	0	0	0
Dennis Rømer	Denmark	9. Germany 2014	1	0	0	0	0	0
Tommy Rustad	Norway	2. Great Britain 2014	12	0	1	0	0	0
Fredrik Salsten	Sweden	33. France 2016	1	0	0	0	0	0
Edward Sandström	Sweden	6. Belgium 2014	5	0	0	0	0	0
Joaquim Santos	Portugal	1. Portugal 2014	5	0	0	0	0	0
Timo Scheider	Germany	22. Barcelona 2015	15	0	0	0	1	0
Ronny Scheveneels	Belgium	6. Belgium 2014	1	0	0	0	0	0
Bernd Schomaker	Germany	9. Germany 2014	1	0	0	0	0	0
Andy Scott	United Kingdom	1. Portugal 2014	11	0	0	0	0	0
Marc Scott	United Kingdom	11. Turkey 2014	1	0	0	0	0	0
Gaëtan Sérazin	France	8. France 2014	4	0	0	0	0	0
Krzysztof Skorupski	Poland	1. Portugal 2014	4	0	0	0	0	0
Kristian Sohlberg	Finland	23. Turkey 2015	1	0	0	0	0	0
Henning Solberg	Norway	2. Great Britain 2014	14	0	0	0	0	0
Petter Solberg	Norway	1. Portugal 2014	54	59	23	10	27	2 (2014–2015)
Andreas Steffen	Germany	36. Germany 2016	2	0	0	0	0	0
Roman Stepanenko	Russia	5. Sweden 2014	2	0	0	0	0	0
Manfred Stohl	Austria	12. Argentina 2014	14	0	0	0	0	0
Riku Tahko	Finland	4. Finland 2014	1	0	0	0	0	0
Ole Kristian Temte	Norway	18. Sweden 2015	2	0	0	0	0	0
Alexandre Theuil	France	1. Portugal 2014	6	0	0	0	0	0
Pontus Tidemand	Sweden	3. Norway 2014	7	0	1	0	0	0
Fredrik Tiger	Sweden	5. Sweden 2014	1	0	0	0	0	0
Timur Timerzyanov	Russia	1. Portugal 2014	54	4	3	0	2	0
Derek Tohill	Ireland	1. Portugal 2014	12	0	0	0	0	0
Erwin Untersalmberger	Italy	10. Italy 2014	1	0	0	0	0	0
Patrick van Mechelen	Belgium	6. Belgium 2014	1	0	0	0	0	0
Ole Christian Veiby	Norway	5. Sweden 2014	4	0	0	0	0	0
Silvo Viitanen	Finland	4. Finland 2014	1	0	0	0	0	0
Jacques Villeneuve	Canada	1. Portugal 2014	7	0	0	0	0	0
Lukas Walfridson	Sweden	2. Great Britain 2014	7	0	0	0	0	0
Stig-Olov Walfridson	Sweden	18. Sweden 2015	1	0	0	0	0	0
Danny Way	United States	14. Hockenheim 2015	1	0	0	0	0	0
Ronny Wechselberger	Germany	9. Germany 2014	1	0	0	0	0	0
Linus Westman	Sweden	10. Italy 2014	1	0	0	0	0	0
Guy Wilks	United Kingdom	16. Great Britain 2015	13	0	0	0	0	0
Christophe Wilt	France	8. France 2014	1	0	0	0	0	0
Joni Wiman	Finland	7. Canada 2014	1	1	0	0	0	0
Markus Winkelhock	Germany	4. Finland 2014	1	0	0	0	0	0
Alexander Wurz	Austria	54. Norway 2018	1	0	0	0	0	0

== By country ==
Information below is correct up to and including the 2018 World RX of Norway.

Country	No. of drivers	Heat wins	Semi-Final wins	Final wins	Championships
Argentina	1	0	0	0	0
Austria	4	0	0	0	0
Belgium	7	0	0	0	0
Canada	3	0	0	0	0
China	1	0	0	0	0
Czechia	1	0	0	0	0
Denmark	1	0	0	0	0
Estonia	4	0	0	0	0
Finland	10	8	4	2	0
France	29	11	6	4	0
Germany	8	0	0	0	0
Hungary	3	0	0	0	0
Ireland	2	0	0	0	0
Italy	5	0	0	0	0
Latvia	2	7	6	1	0
Lebanon	1	0	0	0	0
Lithuania	1	0	0	0	0
Norway	23	76	36	16	2
Poland	3	0	0	0	0
Portugal	2	0	0	0	0
Russia	2	4	3	0	0
South Africa	2	0	0	0	0
Sweden	25	104	53	29	2
Switzerland	1	0	0	0	0
United Kingdom	13	4	1	0	0
United States	4	1	1	1	0
