= Ramona Karlsson =

Swedish racing driver

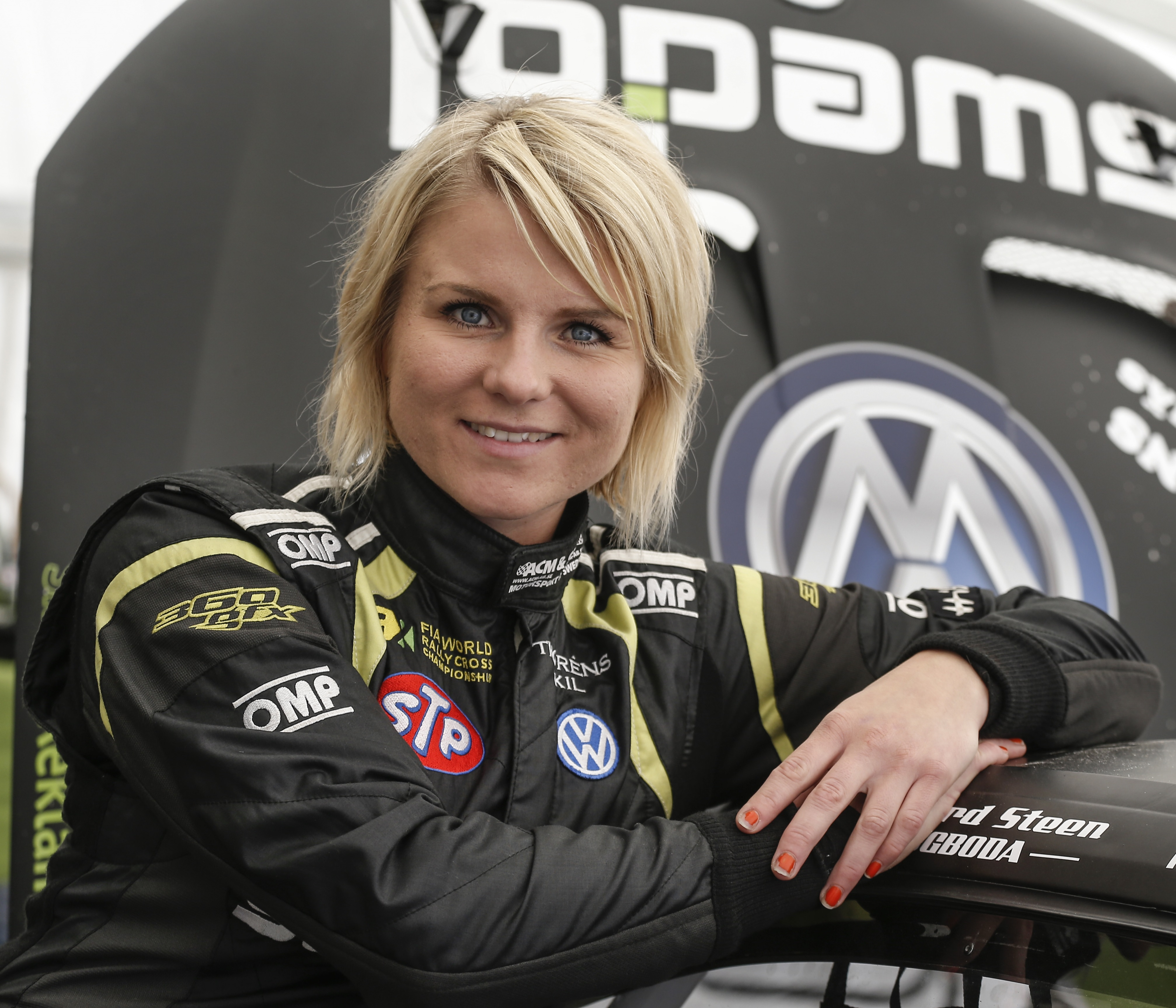
- Ramona Karlsson in 2015
- Nationality: Swedish
- Born: 8 January 1981 (age 45) Kil, Värmland, Sweden

FIA World Rallycross Championship
- Years active: 2014–2015
- Car number: 47
- Former teams: Ramona RX; Albatec Racing; Eklund Motorsport
- Starts: 6
- Wins: 0
- Podiums: 0
- Best finish: 38th in 2014

FIA European Rallycross Championship
- Years active: 2014–2015
- Car number: 47
- Former teams: Ramona RX; Eklund Motorsport
- Starts: 4
- Wins: 0
- Podiums: 0
- Best finish: 23rd in 2015 (Supercar)

Ramona Karlsson (born 8 January 1981) is a former racing driver from Sweden. She has competed in the Production World Rally Championship and FIA World Rallycross Championship. She is also a member of the FIA Women in Motorsport council.

== Racing record ==
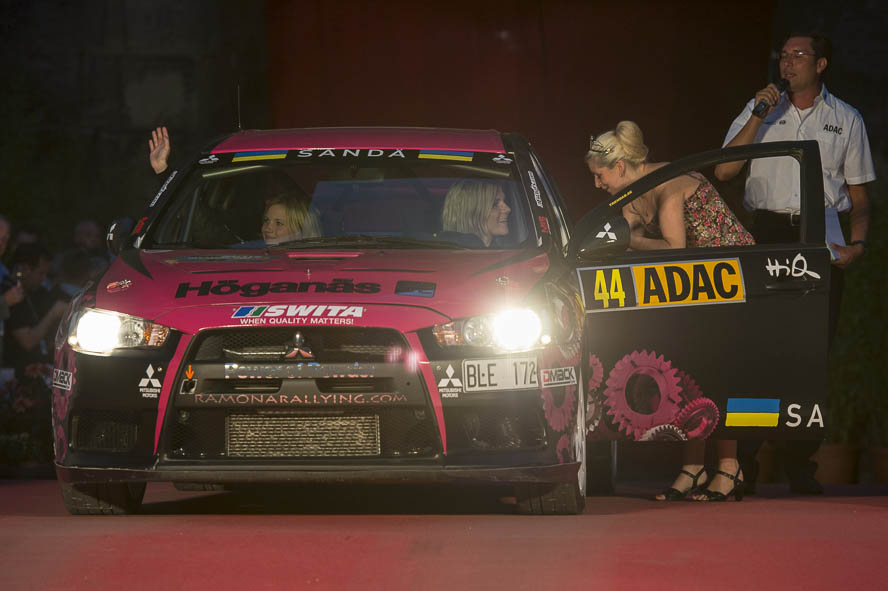
Karlsson at the start of the 2012 Rallye Deutschland.

=== Complete PWRC results ===
Season	Team	Car	1	2	3	4	5	6	7	8	PWRC	Points
2012	Ramona Rallying	Mitsubishi Lancer Evo X	MON	MEX; 6	ARG; Ret	GRE; Ret	NZL; Ret	GER; Ret	ITA; WD	ESP; WD	13th	8

=== Complete FIA World Rallycross Championship results ===
==== Supercar ====
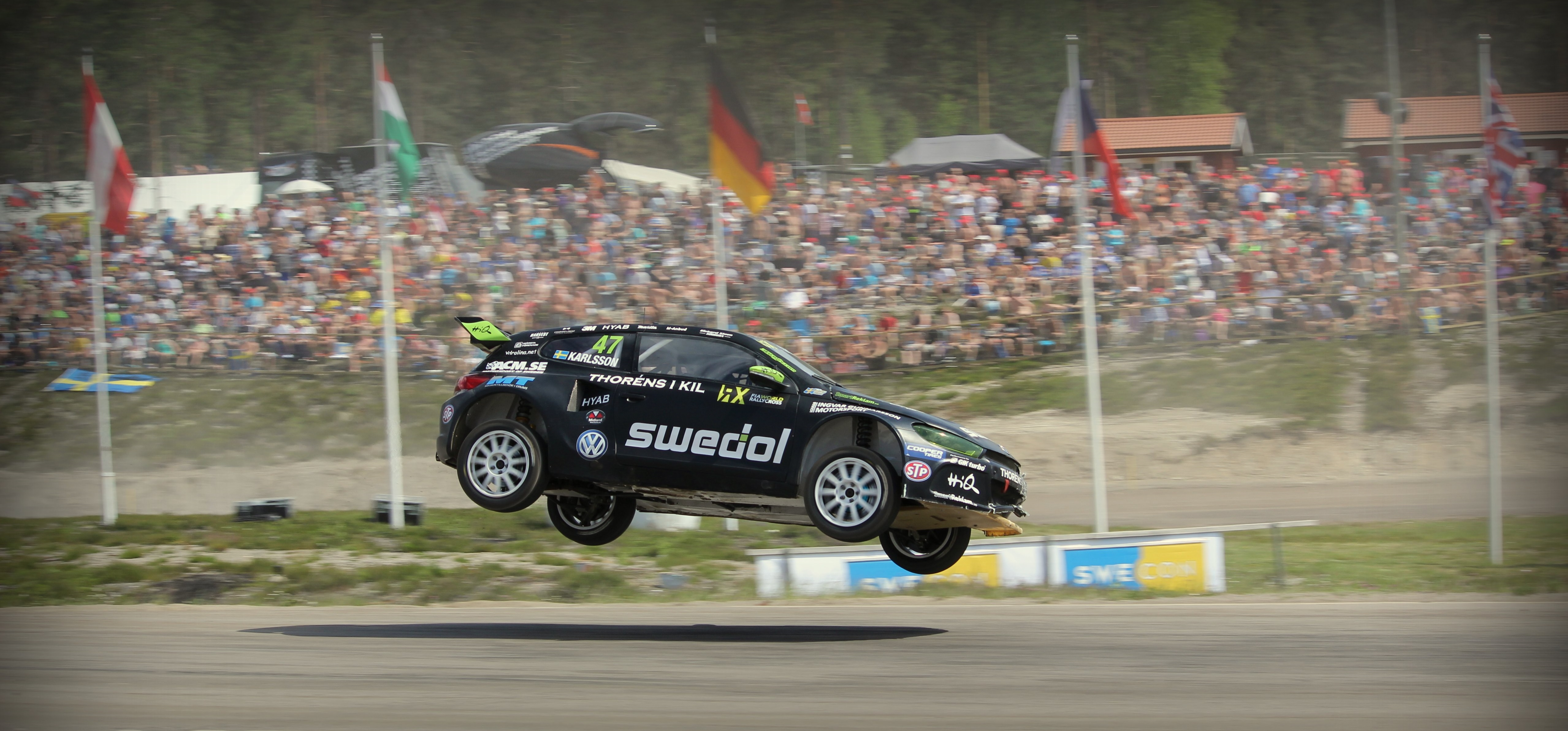
Karlsson in action during the 2015 World RX of Sweden.

Year	Entrant	Car	1	2	3	4	5	6	7	8	9	10	11	12	13	WRX	Points
2014	Per Eklund Motorsport	Saab 9-3	POR; 12	GBR; 30	NOR; 30	FIN	SWE; 26	BEL	CAN	FRA						37th	8
2014	Albatec Racing	Peugeot 208 GTi									GER; 35	ITA	TUR	ARG		37th	8
2015	Ramona RX	Volkswagen Scirocco	POR	HOC	BEL	GBR	GER	SWE; 32	CAN	NOR	FRA	ESP	TUR	ITA	ARG	NC	0

=== Complete FIA European Rallycross Championship results ===
==== Supercar ====
Year	Entrant	Car	1	2	3	4	5	ERX	Points
2014	Eklund Motorsport	Saab 9-3	GBR; 18	NOR; 19	BEL			37th	0
2014	Albatec Racing	Peugeot 208 GTi				GER; 25	ITA	37th	0
2015	Ramona RX	Volkswagen Scirocco	BEL; 15	GER; 14	NOR; 17	BAR; 19	ITA; WD	23rd	5

=== Complete TitansRX Europe results ===
Year	Entrant	Car	1		2		3		4		5		6		Pos.	Pts
2019	MJP	Mercedes-Benz A-Class (W177)	ESS1	ESS2	LYD1	LYD2	MLG1	MLG2	MJP1	MJP2	NYI1; 11	NYI2; 13	EST1	EST2	27th	8

== See also ==
- List of female World Rally Championship drivers
