= Jos Jansen =

Belgian rallycross driver (born 1954)

- Nationality: Belgian
- Born: 8 January 1954 (age 72) Hoeselt, Belgium

FIA World Rallycross Championship career
- Debut season: 2014
- Current team: JJ Racing
- Car number: 54
- Starts: 12
- Wins: 0
- Podiums: 0

Jos Jansen (born 8 January 1954) is a Belgian rallycross driver. He formerly competed in the FIA World Rallycross Championship.

== Results ==
=== FIA World Rallycross Championship ===
==== Supercar ====
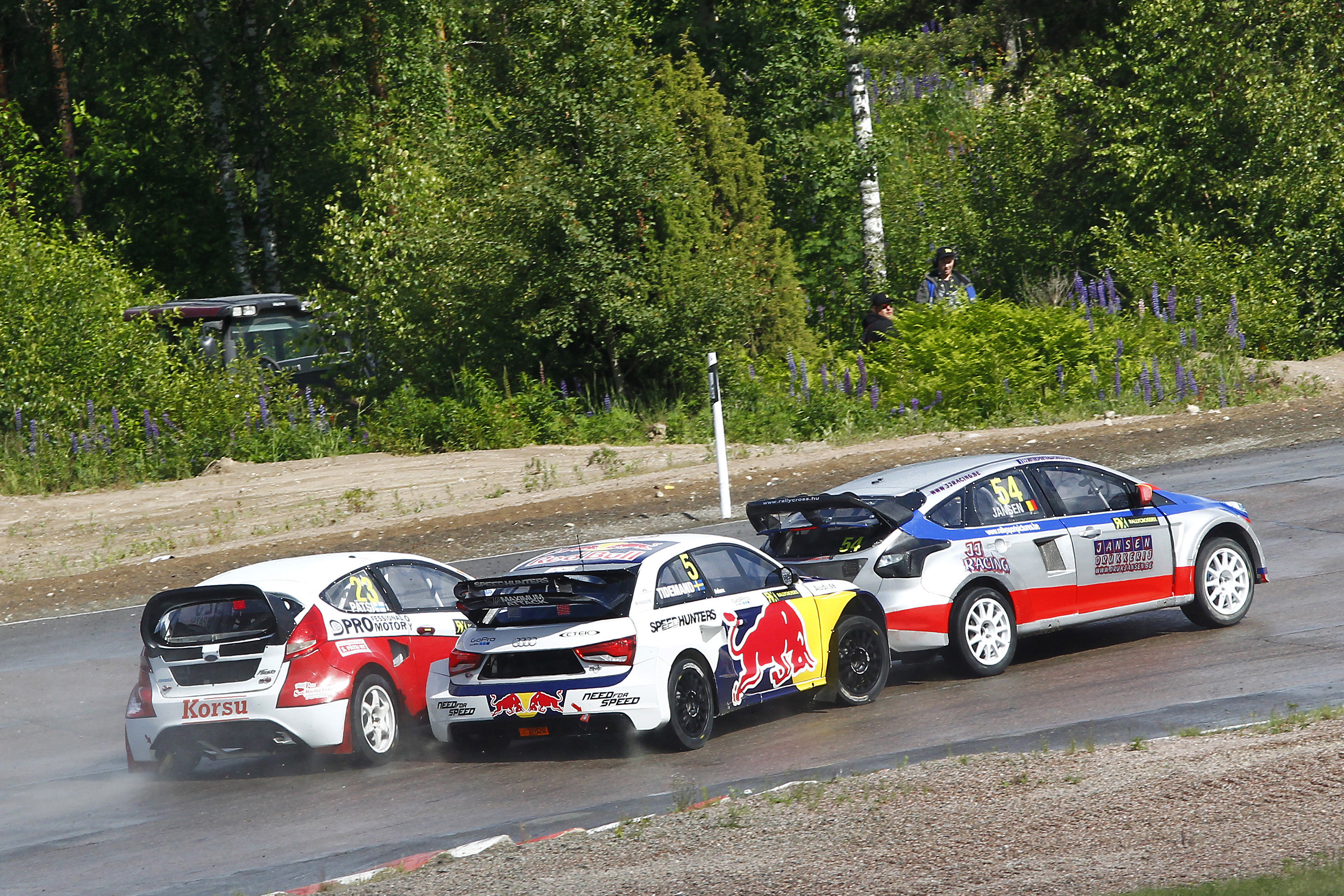
Jansen leads Pontus Tidemand and Teemu Patsi at the 2014 World RX of Finland

Year	Entrant	Car	1	2	3	4	5	6	7	8	9	10	11	12	WRX	Points
2014	JJ Racing	Ford Focus	POR; 10	GBR; 23	NOR; 27	FIN; 18	SWE; 36	BEL; 29	CAN; 15	FRA; 27	GER; 34	ITA; 35	TUR; 16	ARG; 14	33rd	12
