= 2014 World RX of Sweden =

Rallycross event

- Round 5 of 12 in the 2014 FIA World Rallycross Championship
- Date: 5–6 July 2014
- Location: Höljes, Värmland
- Venue: Höljesbanan

Results
Heat winners
- Heat 1: (Norway) Petter Solberg; PSRX
- Heat 2: (Russia) Timur Timerzyanov; Team Peugeot-Hansen
- Heat 3: (Norway) Petter Solberg; PSRX
- Heat 4: (Sweden) Mattias Ekström; EKS RX
Semi-final winners
- Semi-final 1: (Sweden) Mattias Ekström; EKS RX
- Semi-final 2: (Sweden) Sebastian Eriksson; Olsbergs MSE
Final
- First: (Sweden) Mattias Ekström; EKS RX
- Second: (Norway) Andreas Bakkerud; Olsbergs MSE
- Third: (Norway) Petter Solberg; PSRX

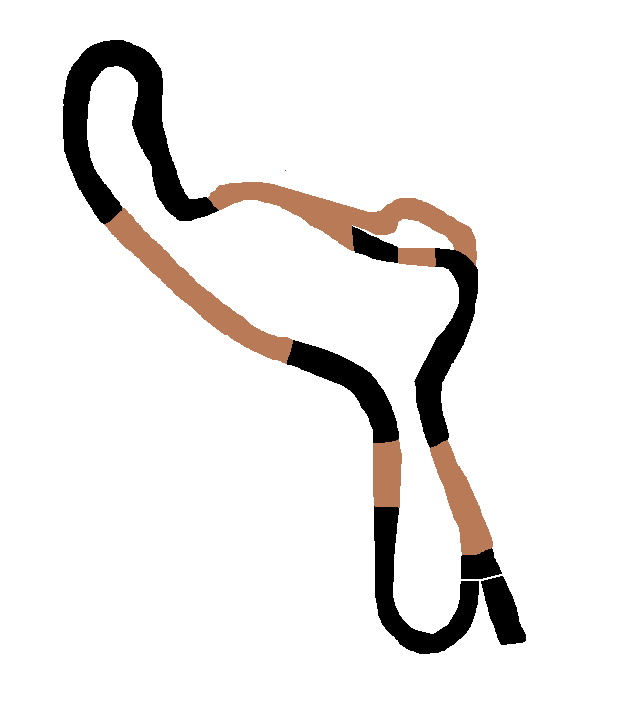
Rallycross layout of the Höljesbanan

The 2014 World RX of Sweden was the fifth round of the inaugural season of the FIA World Rallycross Championship. The event was held at the Höljesbanan in Höljes, Värmland.

== Heats ==
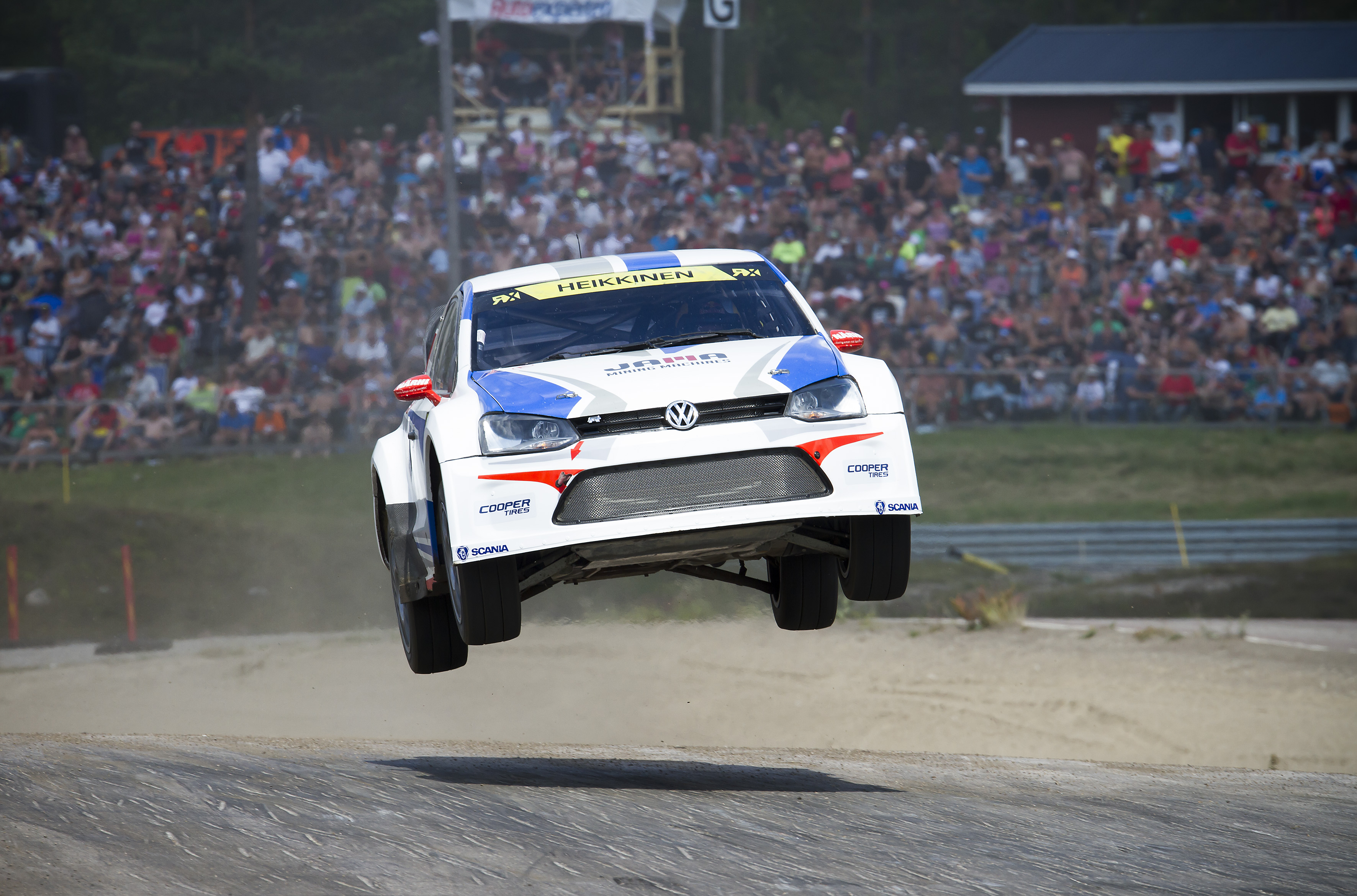
Toomas Heikkinen

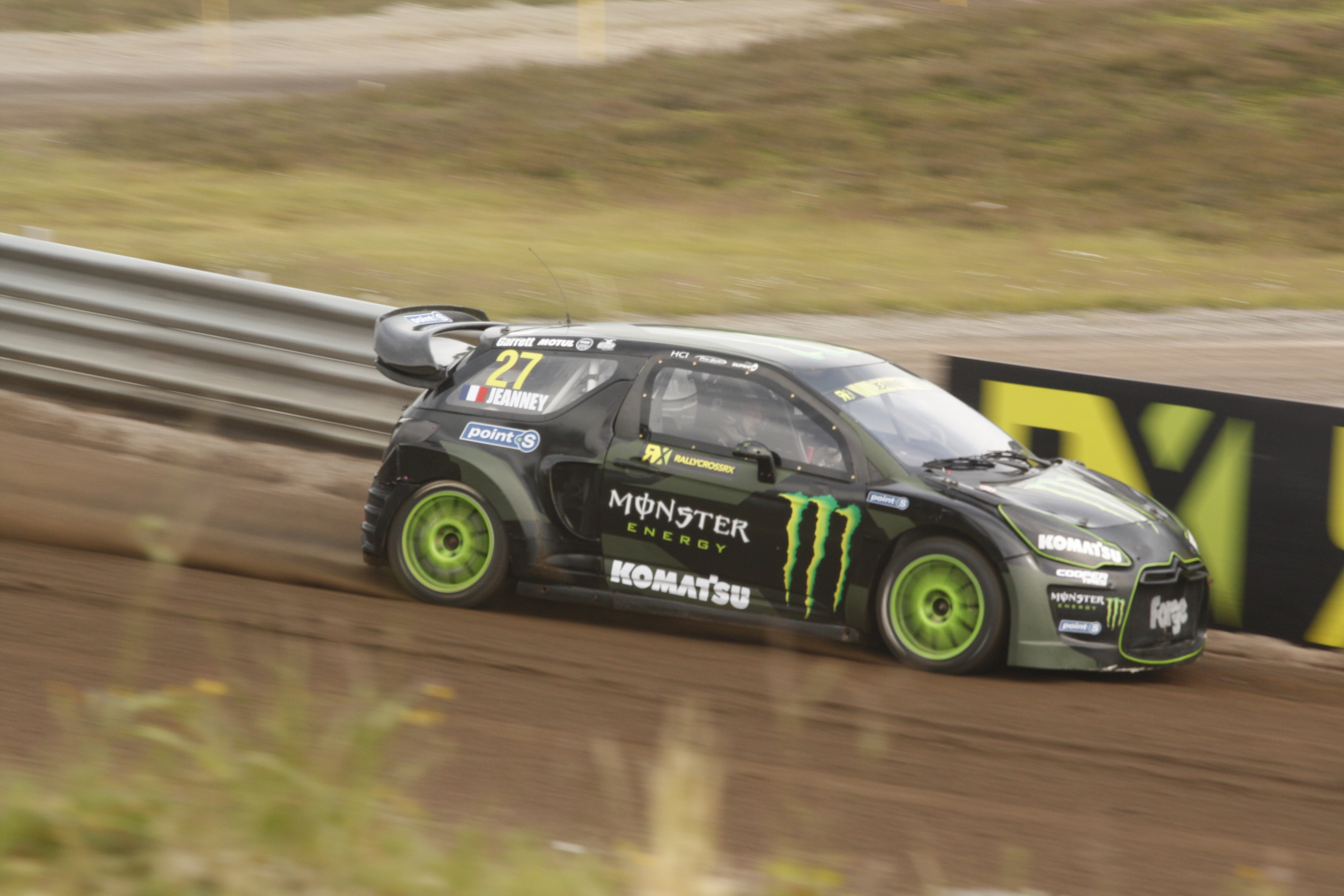
Davy Jeanney

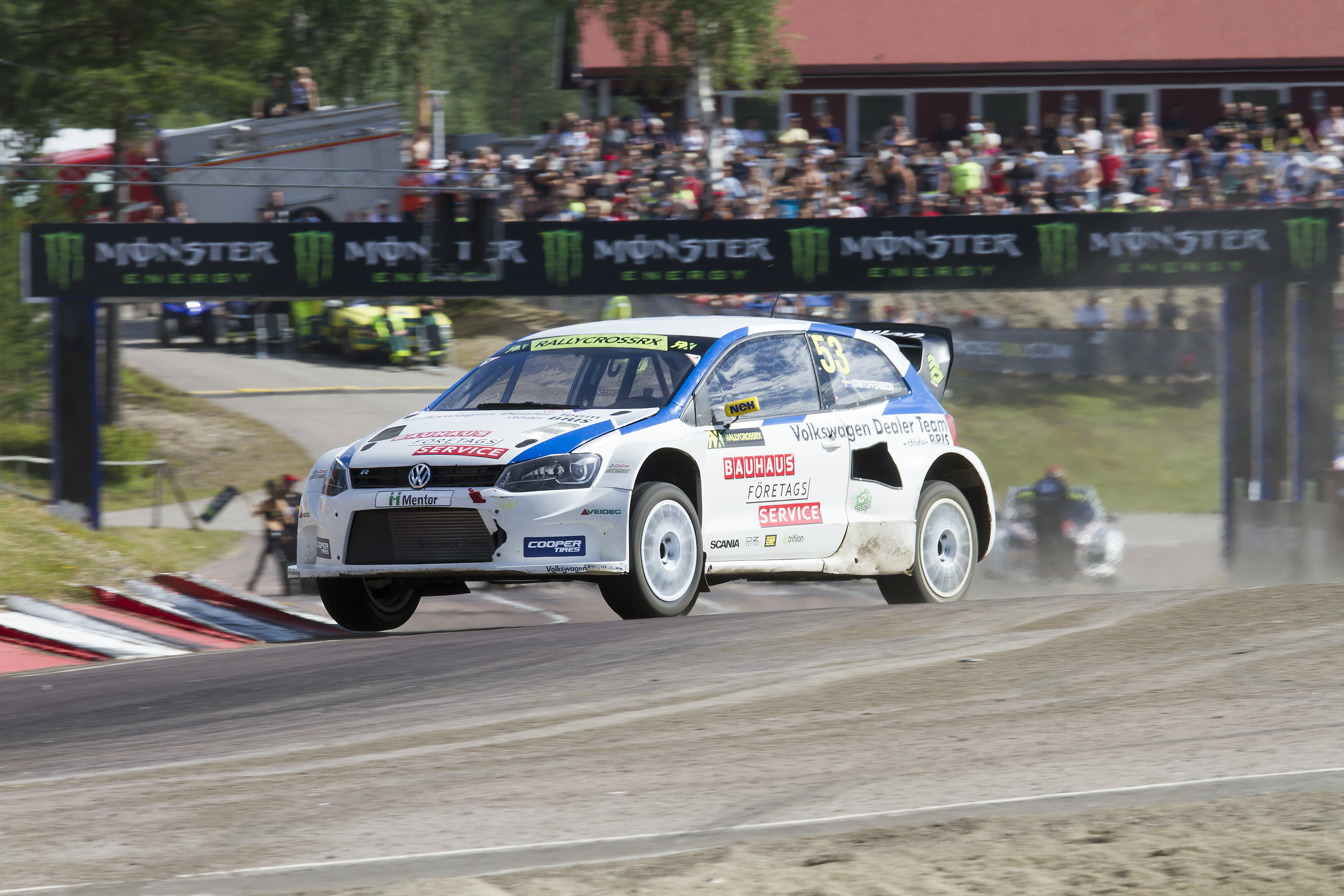
Johan Kristoffersson

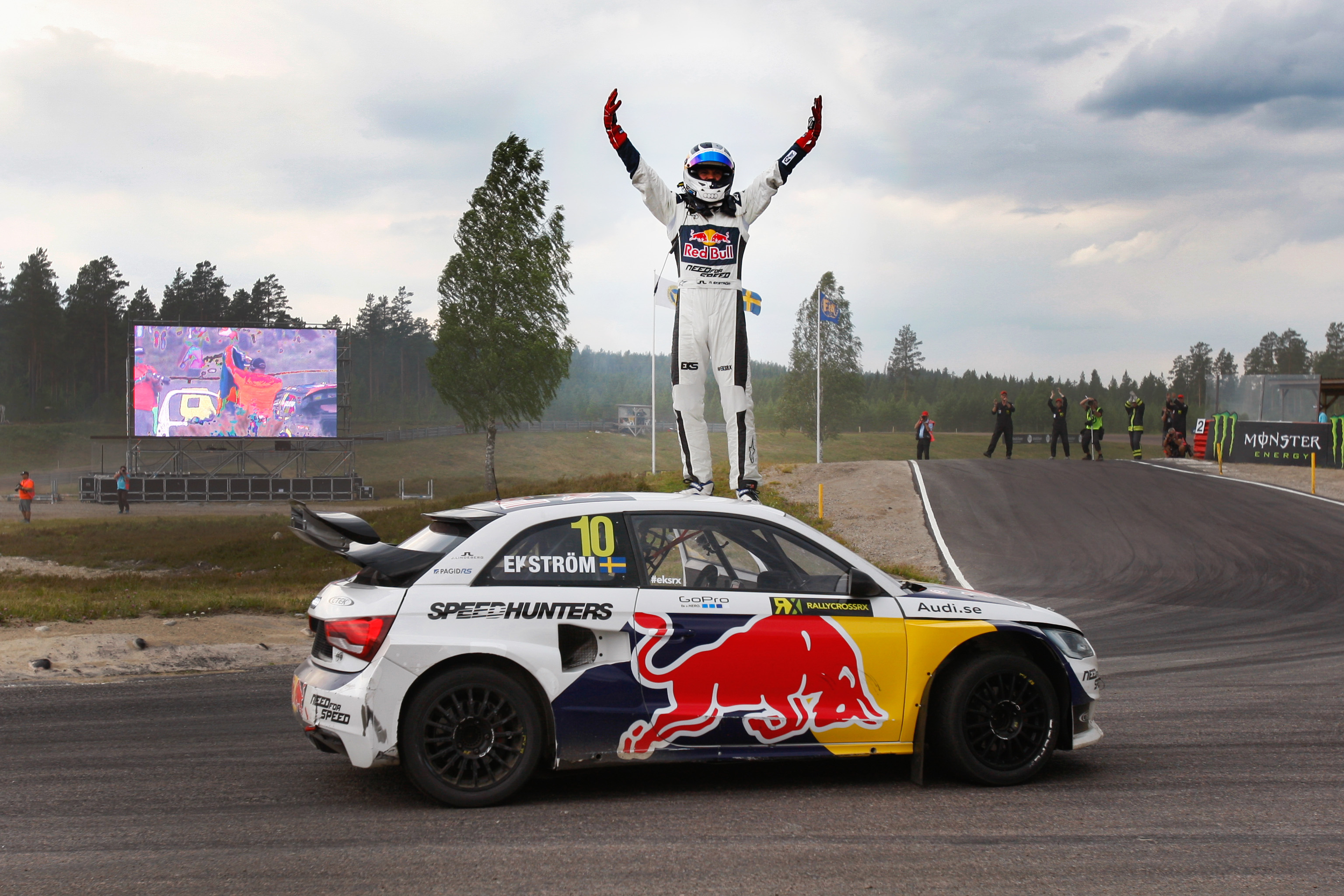
Mattias Ekström celebrates victory

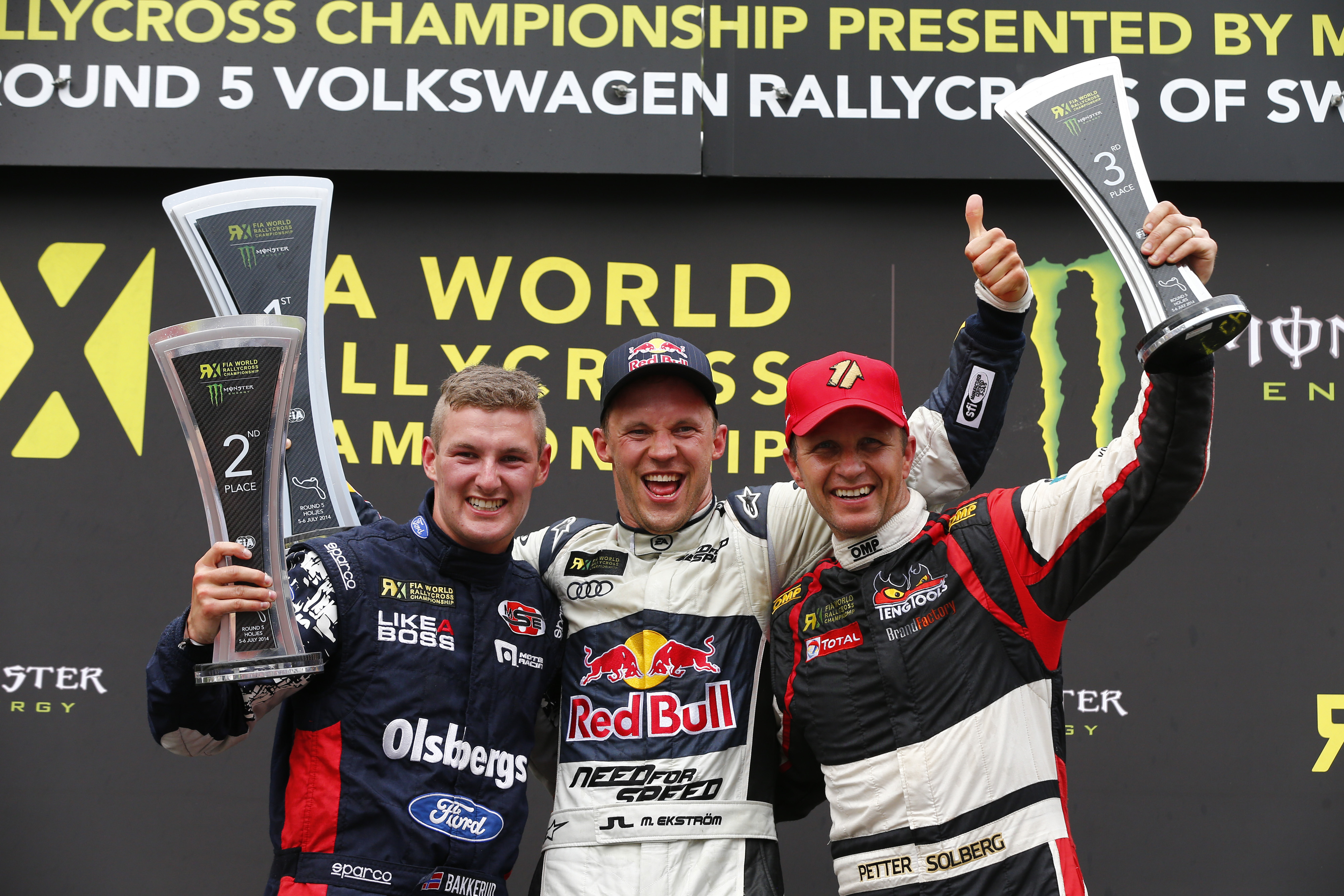
Podium celebrations

Pos.	No.	Driver	Team	Car	H1	H2	H3	H4	Pts
1	10	(Sweden) Mattias Ekström	EKS RX	Audi S1	2nd	3rd	2nd	1st	16
2	11	(Norway) Petter Solberg	PSRX	Citroën DS3	1st	9th	1st	12th	15
3	1	(Russia) Timur Timerzyanov	Team Peugeot-Hansen	Peugeot 208 T16	3rd	1st	5th	13th	14
4	93	(Sweden) Sebastian Eriksson	Olsbergs MSE	Ford Fiesta ST	12th	2nd	8th	2nd	13
5	73	(Norway) Daniel Holten	Olsbergs MSE	Ford Fiesta ST	5th	6th	7th	3rd	12
6	57	(Finland) Toomas Heikkinen	Marklund Motorsport	Volkswagen Polo	4th	4th	9th	10th	11
7	5	(Sweden) Pontus Tidemand	EKS RX	Audi S1	18th	5th	6th	5th	10
8	3	(Sweden) Timmy Hansen	Team Peugeot-Hansen	Peugeot 208 T16	8th	12th	11th	4th	9
9	15	(Latvia) Reinis Nitišs	Olsbergs MSE	Ford Fiesta ST	10th	10th	10th	7th	8
10	13	(Norway) Andreas Bakkerud	Olsbergs MSE	Ford Fiesta ST	11th	13th	3rd	11th	7
11	33	(United Kingdom) Liam Doran	Monster Energy World RX	Citroën DS3	6th	17th	12th	6th	6
12	99	(Norway) Tord Linnerud	Helmia Motorsport	Renault Clio	7th	11th	16th	15th	5
13	88	(Norway) Henning Solberg	Eklund Motorsport	Saab 9-3	9th	8th	15th	21st	4
14	92	(Sweden) Anton Marklund	Marklund Motorsport	Volkswagen Polo	36th	7th	4th	9th	3
15	12	(Norway) Alexander Hvaal	PSRX	Citroën DS3	24th	16th	14th	14th	2
16	40	(Sweden) Eric Färén	Eric Färén	Citroën DS3	13th	14th	20th	26th	1
17	25	(Canada) Jacques Villeneuve	Albatec Racing	Peugeot 208	15th	31st	13th	18th	
18	24	(Norway) Tommy Rustad	HTB Racing	Volvo C30	14th	25th	19th	20th	
19	8	(Sweden) Peter Hedström	Hedströms Motorsport	Škoda Fabia	16th	37th	18th	8th	
20	53	(Sweden) Johan Kristoffersson	Volkswagen Dealer Team KMS	Volkswagen Polo	33rd	19th	17th	17th	
21	52	(Norway) Ole Christian Veiby	Volkswagen Dealer Team KMS	Volkswagen Polo	22nd	24th	23rd	23rd	
22	60	(Finland) Joni-Pekka Rajala	Hedströms Motorsport	Škoda Fabia	21st	22nd	22nd	29th	
23	27	(France) Davy Jeanney	Monster Energy World RX	Citroën DS3	19th	26th	33rd	19th	
24	14	(Norway) Frode Holte	Frode Holte Motorsport	Hyundai i20	32nd	27th	21st	22nd	
25	64	(Norway) Stian Haugan	Stian Haugan	Citroën C4	17th	15th	36th	27th	
26	47	(Sweden) Ramona Karlsson	Eklund Motorsport	Saab 9-3	27th	20th	28th	32nd	
27	31	(Norway) Tore Kristoffersson	Tore Kristoffersson	Ford Fiesta	29th	21st	27th	31st	
28	48	(Sweden) Lukas Walfridson	Helmia Motorsport	Renault Clio	25th	35th	29th	16th	
29	66	(Republic of Ireland) Derek Tohill	LD Motorsports World RX	Citroën DS3	28th	30th	24th	28th	
30	23	(Finland) Teemu Patsi	Teemu Patsi	Ford Fiesta	34th	23rd	31st	30th	
31	62	(Sweden) Fredrik Tiger	Fredrik Tiger	Ford Focus	31st	29th	25th	35th	
32	35	(Norway) Ole Håbjørg	Ole Håbjørg	Renault Clio	26th	33rd	26th	36th	
33	63	(Russia) Roman Stepanenko	TT Motorsport	Citroën C4	20th	38th	30th	33rd	
34	4	(Sweden) Robin Larsson	Larsson Jernberg Motorsport	Audi A1	23rd	34th	38th	24th	
35	49	(Germany) René Münnich	All-Inkl.com Münnich Motorsport	Audi S3	30th	36th	35th	25th	
36	54	(Belgium) Jos Jansen	JJ Racing	Ford Focus	35th	32nd	32nd	34th	
37	42	(Norway) Ludvig Hunsbedt	Ludvig Hunsbedt	Ford Focus	37th	18th	34th	37th	
38	39	(Norway) Åke Holtet	Åke Holtet	Ford Fiesta	38th	28th	37th	38th	

== Semi-finals ==
=== Semi-final 1 ===
Pos.	No.	Driver	Team	Time	Pts
1	10	(Sweden) Mattias Ekström	EKS RX	4:31.022	6
2	15	(Latvia) Reinis Nitišs	Olsbergs MSE	+4.707	5
3	33	(United Kingdom) Liam Doran	Monster Energy World RX	+6.684	4
4	5	(Sweden) Pontus Tidemand	EKS RX	+6.814	3
5	1	(Russia) Timur Timerzyanov	Team Peugeot-Hansen	+10.542	2
6	73	(Norway) Daniel Holten	Olsbergs MSE	+11.430	1

=== Semi-final 2 ===
Pos.	No.	Driver	Team	Time	Pts
1	93	(Sweden) Sebastian Eriksson	Olsbergs MSE	4:30.432	6
2	13	(Norway) Andreas Bakkerud	Olsbergs MSE	+0.245	5
3	11	(Norway) Petter Solberg	PSRX	+0.792	4
4	57	(Finland) Toomas Heikkinen	Marklund Motorsport	+0.978	3
5	3	(Sweden) Timmy Hansen	Team Peugeot-Hansen	DNF	2
6	99	(Norway) Tord Linnerud	Helmia Motorsport	DNF	1

== Final ==
Pos.	No.	Driver	Team	Time	Pts
1	10	(Sweden) Mattias Ekström	EKS RX	4:29.881	8
2	13	(Norway) Andreas Bakkerud	Olsbergs MSE	+10.442	5
3	11	(Norway) Petter Solberg	PSRX	+11.126	4
4	15	(Latvia) Reinis Nitišs	Olsbergs MSE	+11.193	3
5	33	(United Kingdom) Liam Doran	Monster Energy World RX	+15.312	2
6	93	(Sweden) Sebastian Eriksson	Olsbergs MSE	+28.165	1

== Championship standings after the event ==
Pos.	Driver	Points
1	(Latvia) Reinis Nitišs	112
2	(Norway) Petter Solberg	103
3	(Norway) Andreas Bakkerud	93
4	(Finland) Toomas Heikkinen	88
5	(Sweden) Anton Marklund	64

Previous race: 2014 World RX of Finland	FIA World Rallycross Championship; 2014 season	Next race: 2014 World RX of Belgium
Previous race: None	World RX of Sweden	Next race: 2015 World RX of Sweden
