= 2014 World RX of Portugal =

Rallycross event

- Round 1 of 12 in the 2014 FIA World Rallycross Championship
- Date: 3-4 May 2014
- Location: Montalegre, Portugal
- Venue: Pista Automóvel de Montalegre

Results
Heat winners
- Heat 1: (Russia) Timur Timerzyanov; Team Peugeot-Hansen
- Heat 2: (Russia) Timur Timerzyanov; Team Peugeot-Hansen
- Heat 3: (Norway) Petter Solberg; PSRX
- Heat 4: (Norway) Petter Solberg; PSRX
Semi-final winners
- Semi-final 1: (Latvia) Reinis Nitišs; Olsbergs MSE
- Semi-final 2: (Norway) Petter Solberg; PSRX
Final
- First: (Norway) Petter Solberg; PSRX
- Second: (Norway) Andreas Bakkerud; Olsbergs MSE
- Third: (Latvia) Reinis Nitišs; Olsbergs MSE

World RX layout of Circuito Montalegre

The 2014 World RX of Portugal was the opening round of the 2014 FIA World Rallycross Championship and the first ever round of the FIA World Rallycross Championship. The event was held at the Pista Automóvel de Montalegre in the Portuguese border town of Montalegre. Four of the seven stages of the round, including the final, were won by 2003 WRC champion Petter Solberg, with the young guns Bakkerud and Nitišs rounding out the podium for Olsbergs MSE.

== Heats ==
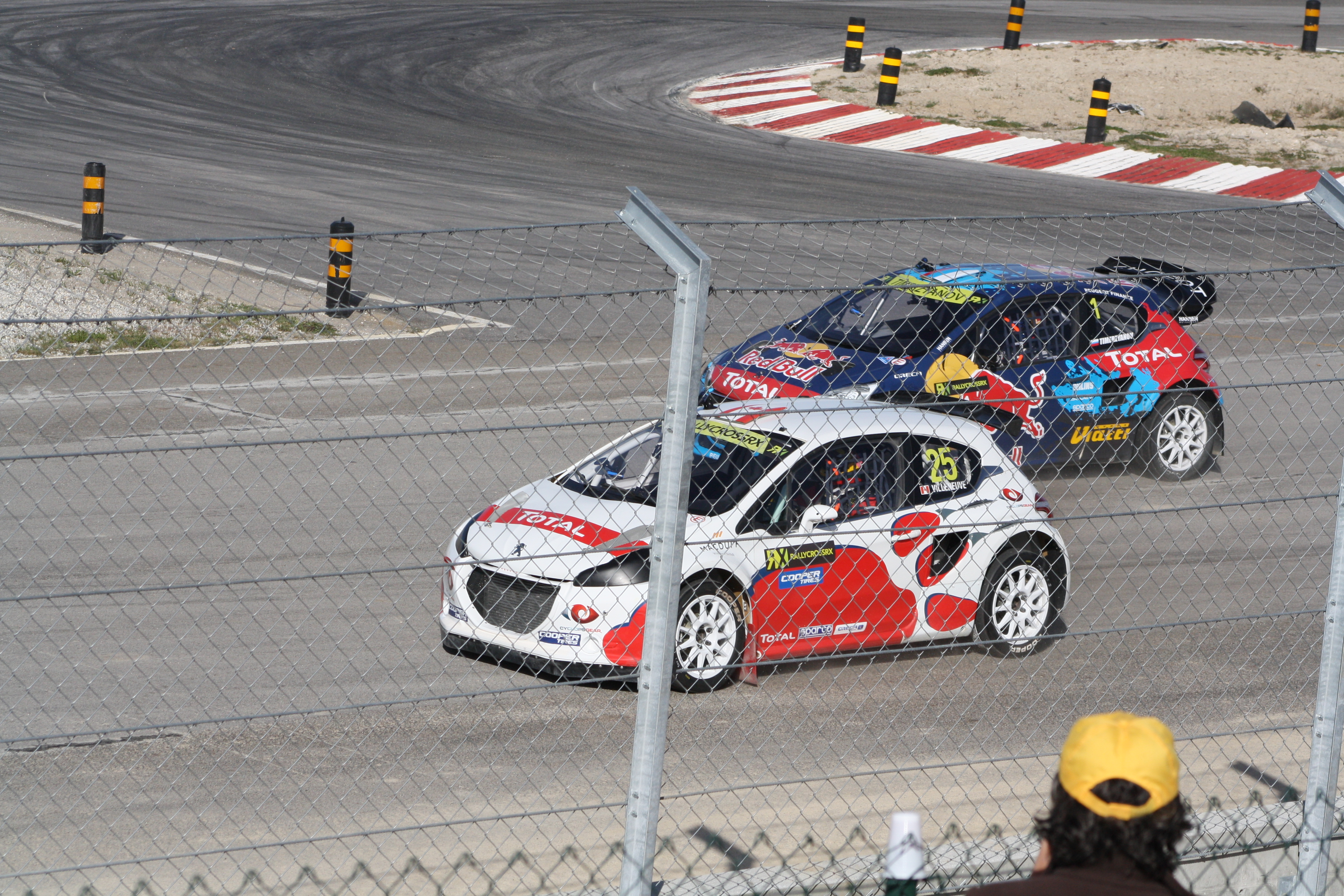
Jacques Villeneuve and Timur Timerzyanov

All entries below the red line were eliminated at the conclusion of the heats.

| Pos. | No. | Driver | Team | Car | H1 | H2 | H3 | H4 | Pts |
|---|---|---|---|---|---|---|---|---|---|
| 1 | 1 | (Russia) Timur Timerzyanov | Team Peugeot-Hansen | Peugeot 208 T16 | 1st | 1st | 2nd | 3rd | 16 |
| 2 | 11 | (Norway) Petter Solberg | PSRX | Citroën DS3 | 2nd | DNF | 1st | 1st | 15 |
| 3 | 15 | (Latvia) Reinis Nitišs | Ford Fiesta ST | Ford Fiesta | 9th | 2nd | 3rd | 4th | 14 |
| 4 | 57 | (Finland) Toomas Heikkinen | Volkswagen Polo | Volkswagen Polo | 4th | 4th | 4th | 7th | 13 |
| 5 | 92 | (Sweden) Anton Marklund | Marklund Motorsport | Volkswagen Polo | 8th | 3rd | 6th | 6th | 12 |
| 6 | 3 | (Sweden) Timmy Hansen | Team Peugeot-Hansen | Peugeot 208 T16 | 5th | 14th | 5th | 2nd | 11 |
| 7 | 13 | (Norway) Andreas Bakkerud | Olsbergs MSE | Ford Fiesta ST | 3rd | 5th | DNF | 5th | 10 |
| 8 | 22 | (Belgium) Koen Pauwels | Koen Pauwels | Ford Focus | 7th | 6th | 11th | 10th | 9 |
| 9 | 12 | (Norway) Alexander Hvaal | PSRX | Citroën DS3 | 6th | 9th | 8th | 16th | 8 |
| 10 | 47 | (Sweden) Ramona Karlsson | Eklund Motorsport | Saab 9-3 | 15th | 12th | 10th | 9th | 7 |
| 11 | 66 | (Republic of Ireland) Derek Tohill | LD Motorsports World RX | Citroën DS3 | 16th | 10th | 9th | 11th | 6 |
| 12 | 26 | (United Kingdom) Andy Scott | Albatec Racing | Peugeot 208 | 10th | 8th | 12th | DNF | 5 |
| 13 | 54 | (Belgium) Jos Jansen | JJ Racing | Ford Focus | 14th | 11th | DNF | 14th | 4 |
| 14 | 41 | (Portugal) Joaquim Santos | Joaquim Santos | Ford Focus | 12th | DNF | 13th | 15th | 3 |
| 15 | 21 | (Poland) Bohdan Ludwiczak | Now or Never | Ford Fiesta | 17th | 13th | 15th | 17th | 2 |
| 16 | 6 | (France) Alexandre Theuil | Alexandre Theuil | Citroën DS3 | 11th | 7th | DNF | DNS | 1 |
| 17 | 25 | (Canada) Jacques Villeneuve | Albatec Racing | Peugeot 208 | 13th | 15th | DNS | 12th | |
| 18 | 44 | (Poland) Krzysztof Skorupski | Monster Energy World RX | Citroën DS3 | DNS | DNF | 14th | 8th | |
| 19 | 33 | (United Kingdom) Liam Doran | Monster Energy World RX | Citroën DS3 | DNS | DNS | 7th | 13th | |

== Semi-finals ==
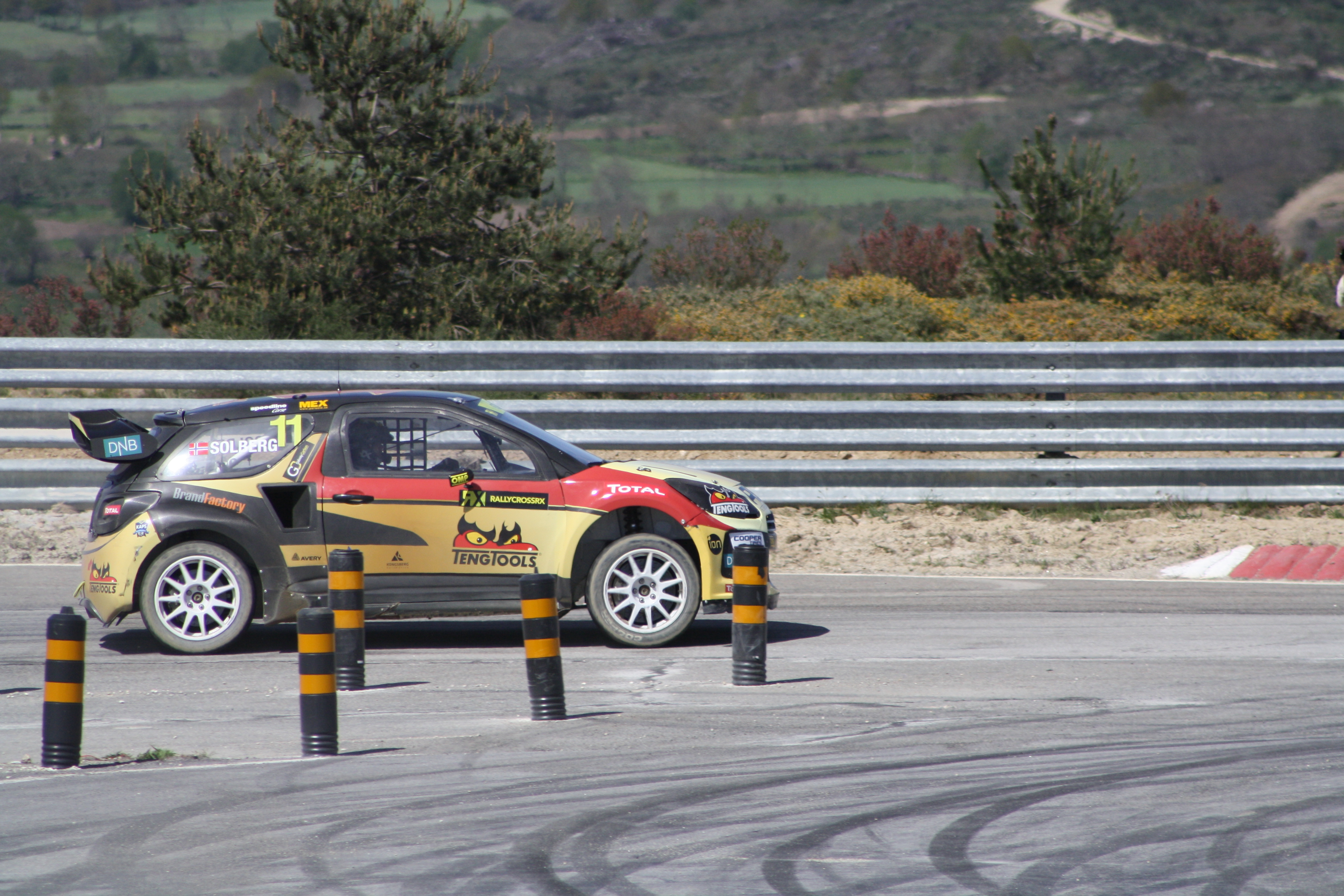
Petter Solberg

Drivers below the red line were eliminated at the conclusion of the semi-finals.

=== Semi-final 1 ===
| Pos. | No. | Driver | Team | Time | Pts |
|---|---|---|---|---|---|
| 1 | 15 | (Latvia) Reinis Nitišs | Olsbergs MSE | 4:09.108 | 6 |
| 2 | 13 | (Norway) Andreas Bakkerud | Olsbergs MSE | +0.438 | 5 |
| 3 | 92 | (Sweden) Anton Marklund | Marklund Motorsport | +1.718 | 4 |
| 4 | 1 | (Russia) Timur Timerzyanov | Team Peugeot-Hansen | +2.032 | 3 |
| 5 | 66 | (Republic of Ireland) Derek Tohill | LD Motorsports World RX | +13.693 | 2 |
| 6 | 12 | (Norway) Alexander Hvaal | PSRX | DNF | 1 |

=== Semi-final 2 ===
| Pos. | No. | Driver | Team | Time | Pts |
|---|---|---|---|---|---|
| 1 | 11 | (Norway) Petter Solberg | PSRX | 4:02.685 | 6 |
| 2 | 57 | (Finland) Toomas Heikkinen | Marklund Motorsport | +2.917 | 5 |
| 3 | 22 | (Belgium) Koen Pauwels | Koen Pauwels | +10.069 | 4 |
| 4 | 3 | (Sweden) Timmy Hansen | Team Peugeot-Hansen | +20.372 | 3 |
| 5 | 54 | (Belgium) Jos Jansen† | JJ Racing | +31.207 | 2 |
| 6 | 47 | (Sweden) Ramona Karlsson | Eklund Motorsport | DNF | 1 |

† Andy Scott was classified overall 12th, however was unable to make the semi-final grid. Jos Jansen was allowed to take his place.

== Final ==
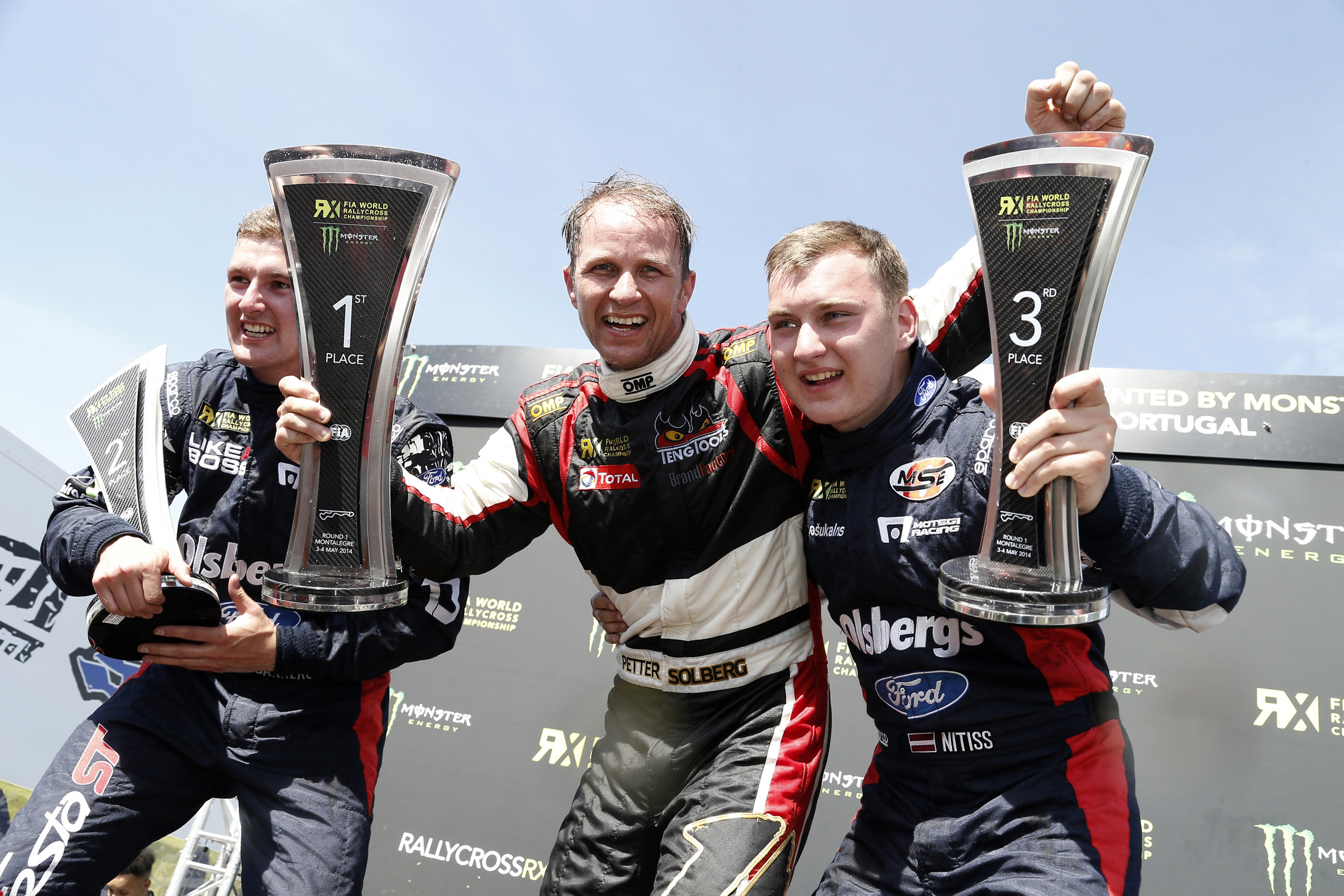
The podium following the final

| Pos. | No. | Driver | Team | Time | Pts |
|---|---|---|---|---|---|
| 1 | 11 | (Norway) Petter Solberg | PSRX | 4:02.081 | 8 |
| 2 | 13 | (Norway) Andreas Bakkerud | Olsbergs MSE | +2.358 | 5 |
| 3 | 15 | (Latvia) Reinis Nitišs | Olsbergs MSE | +3.048 | 4 |
| 4 | 57 | (Finland) Toomas Heikkinen | Marklund Motorsport | +5.025 | 3 |
| 5 | 92 | (Sweden) Anton Marklund | Marklund Motorsport | +5.901 | 2 |
| 6 | 22 | (Belgium) Koen Pauwels | Koen Pauwels | +10.790 | 1 |

== Championship standings after the event ==
| Pos. | Driver | Points |
|---|---|---|
| 1 | (Norway) Petter Solberg | 29 |
| 2 | (Latvia) Reinis Nitišs | 24 |
| 3 | (Finland) Toomas Heikkinen | 21 |
| 4 | (Norway) Andreas Bakkerud | 20 |
| 5 | (Russia) Timur Timerzyanov | 19 |

| Previous race: None | FIA World Rallycross Championship; 2014 season | Next race: 2014 World RX of Great Britain |
| Previous race: None | World RX of Portugal | Next race: 2015 World RX of Portugal |
