= 2014 FIA World Rallycross Championship =

Auto racing championship

The 2014 FIA World Rallycross Championship presented by Monster Energy was the first edition of the FIA World Rallycross Championship. The season consisted of twelve rounds and started on 3 May with the Portuguese round at Montalegre. The season came to end on 23 November, at San Luis, Argentina.

== Calendar ==
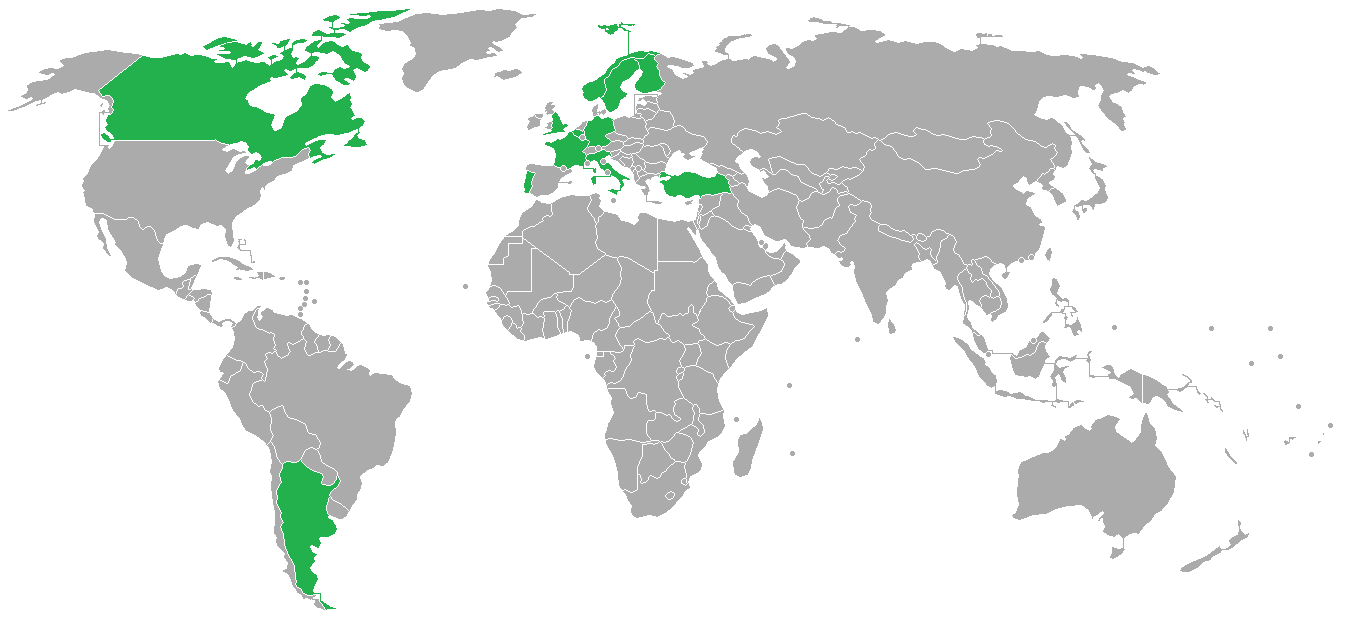
2014 World RX Calendar by nations

Rnd.	Event	Dates	Venue	Class	Winner	Team	Report
1	World RX of Portugal	3–4 May	Pista Automóvel de Montalegre, Montalegre	Supercar	(Norway) Petter Solberg	(Sweden) PSRX	Report
1	World RX of Portugal	3–4 May	Pista Automóvel de Montalegre, Montalegre	RX Lites	(Sweden) Sebastian Eriksson	(Sweden) Olsbergs MSE	Report
2	(United Kingdom) World RX of Great Britain	24–25 May	Lydden Hill Race Circuit, Wootton	Supercar	(Norway) Andreas Bakkerud	(Sweden) Ford Olsbergs MSE	Report
2	(United Kingdom) World RX of Great Britain	24–25 May	Lydden Hill Race Circuit, Wootton	RX Lites	(United States) Mitchell DeJong	(Sweden) Olsbergs MSE	Report
3	World RX of Norway	14–15 June	Lånkebanen, Hell	Supercar	(Latvia) Reinis Nitišs	(Sweden) Ford Olsbergs MSE	Report
4	World RX of Finland	28–29 June	Tykkimäki, Kouvola	Supercar	(United States) Tanner Foust	(Sweden) Marklund Motorsport	Report
4	World RX of Finland	28–29 June	Tykkimäki, Kouvola	RX Lites	(Sweden) Kevin Hansen	(Sweden) Hansen Junior Team	Report
5	World RX of Sweden	5–6 July	Höljesbanan, Höljes	Supercar	(Sweden) Mattias Ekström	(Sweden) EKS RX	Report
5	World RX of Sweden	5–6 July	Höljesbanan, Höljes	RX Lites	(Sweden) Kevin Eriksson	(Sweden) Olsbergs MSE	Report
6	World RX of Belgium	12–13 July	Circuit Jules Tacheny Mettet, Mettet	Supercar	(Finland) Toomas Heikkinen	(Sweden) Marklund Motorsport	Report
7	World RX of Canada	7–8 August	Circuit Trois-Rivières, Trois-Rivières	Supercar	(Norway) Petter Solberg	(Sweden) PSRX	Report
8	World RX of France	6–7 September	Circuit de Lohéac, Lohéac	Supercar	(Norway) Petter Solberg	(Sweden) PSRX	Report
9	World RX of Germany	20–21 September	Estering, Buxtehude	Supercar	(Norway) Petter Solberg	(Sweden) PSRX	Report
10	World RX of Italy	27–28 September	Autodromo di Franciacorta, Castrezzato	Supercar	(Sweden) Timmy Hansen	(Sweden) Team Peugeot-Hansen	Report
10	World RX of Italy	27–28 September	Autodromo di Franciacorta, Castrezzato	RX Lites	(Norway) Daniel Holten	(Sweden) Olsbergs MSE	Report
11	World RX of Turkey	11–12 October	Istanbul Park, Tuzla	Supercar	(Norway) Andreas Bakkerud	(Sweden) Ford Olsbergs MSE	Report
11	World RX of Turkey	11–12 October	Istanbul Park, Tuzla	RX Lites	(Sweden) Sebastian Eriksson	(Sweden) Olsbergs MSE	Report
12	World RX of Argentina	28–29 November	Autódromo Rosendo Hernández, San Luis	Supercar	(Norway) Petter Solberg	(Sweden) PSRX	Report

Event of FIA ERX (including Supercars)
Event of FIA ERX (except Supercars)

== Teams and drivers ==
Permanent entries
Constructor	Entrant	Car	No.	Driver	Rounds
Citroën	(Norway) PSRX	Citroën DS3	11	(Norway) Petter Solberg	All
Citroën	(Norway) PSRX	Citroën DS3	12	(Norway) Alexander Hvaal	1–5
Citroën	(Norway) PSRX	Citroën DS3	95	(Italy) Simone Romagna	8–10
Citroën	(Norway) PSRX	Citroën DS3	97	(Estonia) Sten Oja	7, 11
Citroën	(Norway) PSRX	Citroën DS3	107	(Austria) Manfred Stohl	12
Citroën	(United Kingdom) Monster Energy World RX	Citroën DS3	27	(France) Davy Jeanney	5–10
Citroën	(United Kingdom) Monster Energy World RX	Citroën DS3	33	(United Kingdom) Liam Doran	1–6, 12
Citroën	(United Kingdom) Monster Energy World RX	Citroën DS3	44	(Poland) Krzysztof Skorupski	1–4
Citroën	(United Kingdom) Monster Energy World RX	Citroën DS3	88	(Norway) Henning Solberg	7–12
Citroën	(United Kingdom) Monster Energy World RX	Citroën DS3	133	(Norway) Lars Øivind Enerberg	11
Citroën	(United Kingdom) LD Motorsports World RX	Citroën DS3	66	(Republic of Ireland) Derek Tohill	All
Ford	(Sweden) Ford Olsbergs MSE	Ford Fiesta ST	13	(Norway) Andreas Bakkerud	All
Ford	(Sweden) Ford Olsbergs MSE	Ford Fiesta ST	15	(Latvia) Reinis Nitišs	All
Ford	(Poland) Now or Never	Ford Fiesta ST	21	(Poland) Bohdan Ludwiczak	1-2, 8-12
Ford	(Belgium) JJ Racing	Ford Focus	54	(Belgium) Jos Jansen	All
Peugeot	(Sweden) Team Peugeot-Hansen	Peugeot 208 T16	1	(Russia) Timur Timerzyanov	All
Peugeot	(Sweden) Team Peugeot-Hansen	Peugeot 208 T16	3	(Sweden) Timmy Hansen	All
Peugeot	(United Kingdom) Albatec Racing	Peugeot 208	2	(Republic of Ireland) Oliver O'Donovan	12
Peugeot	(United Kingdom) Albatec Racing	Peugeot 208	25	(Canada) Jacques Villeneuve	1, 3–7, 10
Peugeot	(United Kingdom) Albatec Racing	Peugeot 208	26	(United Kingdom) Andy Scott	1–2, 6–12
Peugeot	(United Kingdom) Albatec Racing	Peugeot 208	27	(France) Davy Jeanney	2
Peugeot	(United Kingdom) Albatec Racing	Peugeot 208	47	(Sweden) Ramona Karlsson	9
Peugeot	(United Kingdom) Albatec Racing	Peugeot 208	81	(United Kingdom) David Binks	8
Peugeot	(United Kingdom) Albatec Racing	Peugeot 208	122	(United Kingdom) Marc Scott	11
Volkswagen	(Sweden) Marklund Motorsport	Volkswagen Polo	57	(Finland) Toomas Heikkinen	All
Volkswagen	(Sweden) Marklund Motorsport	Volkswagen Polo	92	(Sweden) Anton Marklund	All
Entries ineligible to score team points: Constructor / Entrant / Car / No. / Driver / Rounds; Audi / (Sweden) Larsson Jernberg Motorsport / Audi A1 / 4 / (Sweden) Robin Larsson / 2-3, 5-6, 9–10; Audi / (Sweden) EKS RX / Audi S1 / 5 / (Sweden) Pontus Tidemand / 3–6, 8-10; Audi / (Sweden) EKS RX / Audi S1 / 10 / (Sweden) Mattias Ekström / 3, 5, 9; Audi / (Sweden) EKS RX / Audi S1 / 79 / (Sweden) Edward Sandström / 6, 8, 10–11; Audi / (Sweden) EKS RX / Audi S1 / 80 / (Germany) Markus Winkelhock / 4; Audi / (Sweden) EKS RX / Audi S1 / 100 / (Sweden) Per-Gunnar Andersson / 11; Audi / (Germany) All-Inkl.com Münnich Motorsport / Audi S3 / 49 / (Germany) René Münnich / 5, 9–10; Citroën / (France) Alexandre Theuil / Citroën DS3 / 6 / (France) Alexandre Theuil / 1–2, 6, 8–10; Citroën / (Sweden) Öhman Racing / Citroën DS3 / 7 / (Sweden) Emil Öhman / 2–3, 6, 9–10; Citroën / (Sweden) Öhman Racing / Citroën DS3 / 17 / (Sweden) Mats Öhman / 2–3, 9; Citroën / (Sweden) Eric Färén / Citroën DS3 / 40 / (Sweden) Eric Färén / 2, 5; Citroën / (United Kingdom) LD Motorsports / Citroën DS3 / 58 / (Finland) Riku Tahko / 4; Citroën / (France) Hervé "Knapick" Lemonnier / Citroën DS3 / 84 / (France) "Knapick" / 8; Citroën / (France) Hervé "Knapick" Lemonnier / Citroën DS3 / 85 / (France) Christian Beroujon / 8; Citroën / (France) Christophe Wilt / Citroën C4 / 28 / (France) Christophe Wilt / 8; Citroën / (Norway) Morten Bergminrud / Citroën C4 / 30 / (Norway) Morten Bergminrud / 3, 9–10; Citroën / (Russia) TT Motorsport / Citroën C4 / 63 / (Russia) Roman Stepanenko / 5, 10; Citroën / (Norway) Stian Haugan / Citroën C4 / 64 / (Norway) Stian Haugan / 5; Citroën / (France) Marc Laboulle / Citroën C4 / 71 / (France) Marc Laboulle / 8; Citroën / (France) Jean-Baptiste Dubourg / Citroën C4 / 87 / (France) Jean-Baptiste Dubourg / 8; Citroën / (Lebanon) Nabil Karam / Citroën Xsara / 89 / (Lebanon) Nabil Karam / 8; Ford / (Republic of Ireland) Oliver O'Donovan / Ford Focus / 2 / (Republic of Ireland) Oliver O'Donovan / 2, 8; Ford / (Belgium) Koen Pauwels / Ford Focus / 22 / (Belgium) Koen Pauwels / 1–3, 6, 8–9; Ford / (Norway) Stein Egil Jenssen / Ford Focus / 36 / (Norway) Stein Egil Jenssen / 3, 9; Ford / (Portugal) Joaquim Santos / Ford Focus / 41 / (Portugal) Joaquim Santos / 1; Ford / (Norway) Ludvig Hunsbedt / Ford Focus / 42 / (Norway) Ludvig Hunsbedt / 5; Ford / (Italy) Christian Giarolo / Ford Focus / 46 / (Italy) Christian Giarolo / 10; Ford / (Sweden) Fredrik Tiger / Ford Focus / 65 / (Sweden) Fredrik Tiger / 5; Ford / (Germany) ACN Buxtehude / Ford Focus / 86 / (Germany) Jörg Jockel / 9; Ford / (France) Pascal Le Nouvel / Ford Focus / 98 / (France) Pascal Le Nouvel / 8; Ford / (Finland) Teemu Patsi / Ford Fiesta ST / 23 / (Finland) Teemu Patsi / 4–5; Ford / (Norway) Tore Kristoffersen / Ford Fiesta ST / 31 / (Norway) Tore Kristoffersen / 3, 5, 10; Ford / (Czech Republic) Czech National Team / Ford Fiesta ST / 37 / (Czech Republic) Pavel Koutný / 2–3, 6, 10; Ford / (Norway) Åke Holtet / Ford Fiesta ST / 39 / (Norway) Åke Holtet / 5; Ford / (Finland) Atro Määttä / Ford Fiesta ST / 45 / (Finland) Atro Määttä / 4; Ford / (United Kingdom) Kevin Procter / Ford Fiesta ST / 50 / (United Kingdom) Kevin Procter / 8; Ford / (United Kingdom) Julian Godfrey / Ford Fiesta ST / 51 / (United Kingdom) Julian Godfrey / 2; Ford / (Finland) Silvo Viitanen / Ford Fiesta ST / 56 / (Finland) Silvo Viitanen / 4; Ford / (Estonia) Reinsalu Sport / Ford Fiesta ST / 61 / (Estonia) Valdur Reinsalu / 4; Ford / (Estonia) Reinsalu Sport / Ford Fiesta ST / 62 / (Estonia) Andri Õun / 4; Ford / (Belgium) OTRT / Ford Fiesta ST / 70 / (Belgium) Patrick van Mechelen / 6; Ford / (Sweden) Olsbergs MSE / Ford Fiesta ST / 73 / (Norway) Daniel Holten / 3, 5; Ford / (Sweden) Olsbergs MSE / Ford Fiesta ST / 77 / (United Kingdom) Andrew Jordan / 2; Ford / (Sweden) Olsbergs MSE / Ford Fiesta ST / 93 / (Sweden) Sebastian Eriksson / 5; Ford / (Sweden) Olsbergs MSE / Ford Fiesta ST / 94 / (Finland) Joni Wiman / 7; Ford / (Sweden) Olsbergs MSE / Ford Fiesta ST / 111 / (Sweden) Richard Göransson / 10–11; Ford / (Sweden) Olsbergs MSE / Ford Fiesta ST / 125 / (Italy) Gigi Galli / 10; Ford / (Sweden) Olsbergs MSE / Ford Fiesta ST / 196 / (Sweden) Kevin Eriksson / 12; Ford / (Italy) Erwin Untersalmberger / Ford Fiesta ST / 103 / (Italy) Erwin Untersalmberger / 10; Ford / (United States) Hoonigan Racing Division / Ford Fiesta ST / 43 / (United States) Ken Block / 3, 8; Hyundai / (Norway) Frode Holte / Hyundai i20 / 14 / (Norway) Frode Holte / 2–3, 5, 9; Peugeot / (France) Pailler Compétition / Peugeot 208 / 18 / (France) Jonathan Pailler / 8; Peugeot / (France) Pailler Compétition / Peugeot 208 / 19 / (France) Jean-Luc Pailler / 2; Peugeot / (France) Pailler Compétition / Peugeot 208 / 20 / (France) Fabien Pailler / 2, 8; Peugeot / (France) Gaëtan Sérazin / Peugeot 208 / 55 / (France) Gaëtan Sérazin / 8; Peugeot / (France) Patrick Guillerme / Peugeot 208 / 83 / (France) Patrick Guillerme / 8; Peugeot / (France) Rodolphe Audran / Peugeot 207 / 72 / (France) Rodolphe Audran / 8; Peugeot / (France) Laurent Bouliou / Peugeot 207 / 78 / (France) Laurent Bouliou / 8; Renault / (Norway) Ole Håbjørg / Renault Clio / 35 / (Norway) Ole Håbjørg / 3, 5, 9; Renault / (Sweden) Helmia Motorsport / Renault Clio / 48 / (Sweden) Lukas Walfridson / 2–3, 5–6, 9–10; Renault / (Sweden) Helmia Motorsport / Renault Clio / 99 / (Norway) Tord Linnerud / 2–3, 5–6, 9–10; Renault / (France) Jérôme Grosset-Janin / Renault Clio / 74 / (France) Jérôme Grosset-Janin / 2–3, 6, 8–10; Renault / (France) Martial Barbette / Renault Mégane / 75 / (France) Martial Barbette / 8; Saab / (Sweden) Per Eklund Motorsport / Saab 9-3 / 47 / (Sweden) Ramona Karlsson / 1–3, 5; Saab / (Sweden) Per Eklund Motorsport / Saab 9-3 / 88 / (Norway) Henning Solberg / 2–3, 5-6; Saab / (Sweden) Per Eklund Motorsport / Saab 9-3 / 101 / (Sweden) Per Eklund / 9; Saab / (Sweden) Per Eklund Motorsport / Saab 9-3 / 105 / (Sweden) Linus Westman / 10; SEAT / (Denmark) Dennis Rømer / SEAT Córdoba / 29 / (Denmark) Dennis Rømer / 9; Škoda / (Sweden) Hedström Motorsport / Škoda Fabia / 8 / (Sweden) Peter Hedström / 2–3, 5–6, 9–10; Škoda / (Sweden) Hedström Motorsport / Škoda Fabia / 60 / (Finland) Joni-Pekka Rajala / 4–5; Škoda / (Germany) Bernd Schomaker / Škoda Fabia / 38 / (Germany) Bernd Schomaker / 9; Škoda / (Finland) ARP-Motorsport Oy / Škoda Fabia / 59 / (Finland) Aki Karttunen / 4; Škoda / (Belgium) Ronny Scheveneels / Škoda Fabia / 68 / (Belgium) Ronny Scheveneels / 6; Škoda / (Sweden) Per-Gunnar Andersson / Škoda Fabia / 100 / (Sweden) Per-Gunnar Andersson / 9; Škoda / (Hungary) Racing-Com / Škoda Fabia / 102 / (Hungary) Tamás Kárai / 10; Škoda / (Hungary) Nyirad Motorsport / Škoda Fabia / 104 / (Hungary) Attila Mozer / 10; Škoda / (Argentina) Miguel Baldoni / Škoda Fabia / 106 / (Argentina) Miguel Baldoni / 12; Subaru / (United States) Subaru Rally Team USA / Subaru Impreza WRX STi / 96 / (Norway) Sverre Isachsen / 7; Volkswagen / (Belgium) De Bokkenrijders / VW Scirocco / 9 / (Belgium) Michaël De Keersmaecker / 6; Volkswagen / (Belgium) OTRT / VW Scirocco / 69 / (Belgium) Jochen Coox / 2, 9; Volkswagen / (Sweden) Marklund Motorsport / Volkswagen Polo / 34 / (United States) Tanner Foust / 2, 4, 7; Volkswagen / (Sweden) Marklund Motorsport / Volkswagen Polo / 67 / (Belgium) François Duval / 6; Volkswagen / (Sweden) Marklund Motorsport / Volkswagen Polo / 82 / (Canada) Patrick Carpentier / 7; Volkswagen / (Sweden) Marklund Motorsport / Volkswagen Polo / 90 / (Germany) Ronny Wechselberger / 9; Volkswagen / (Sweden) Volkswagen Dealer Team KMS / Volkswagen Polo / 52 / (Norway) Ole Christian Veiby / 5–6; Volkswagen / (Sweden) Volkswagen Dealer Team KMS / Volkswagen Polo / 53 / (Sweden) Johan Kristoffersson / 5–6, 9–10; Volvo / (Norway) HTB Racing / Volvo C30 / 24 / (Norway) Tommy Rustad / 2–3, 5-6, 9–10; Volvo / (Norway) Ole Kristian Nøttveit / Volvo C30 / 32 / (Norway) Ole Kristian Nøttveit / 3; Volvo / (Norway) DWC Racing / Volvo C30 / 91 / (Norway) Guttorm Lindefjell / 9

== Results and standings ==
=== FIA World Rallycross Championship for Drivers ===
(key)

Pos.	Driver	POR (Portugal)	GBR (United Kingdom)	NOR (Norway)	FIN (Finland)	SWE (Sweden)	BEL (Belgium)	CAN (Canada)	FRA (France)	GER (Germany)	ITA (Italy)	TUR (Turkey)	ARG (Argentina)	Points
1	(Norway) Petter Solberg	1	6	2	10	3	3	1	1	1	3	6	1	267
2	(Finland) Toomas Heikkinen	4	4	7	7	8	1	5	10	5	8	3	5	221
3	(Latvia) Reinis Nitišs	3	7	1	3	4	8	4	2	16	11	7	2	210
4	(Sweden) Timmy Hansen	8	11	6	9	11	2	7	3	6	1	2	4	199
5	(Norway) Andreas Bakkerud	2	1	11	2	2	29	8	9	11	6	1	6	193
6	(Sweden) Anton Marklund	5	12	8	5	14	4	2	8	17	6	4	7	173
7	(Russia) Timur Timerzyanov	7	29	4	11	7	7	3	6	7	4	8	8	152
8	(Sweden) Pontus Tidemand			13	13	10	5		5	4	13			84
9	(Sweden) Robin Larsson		2	20		34	6			3	10			76
10	(Norway) Henning Solberg		9	5		13	15	11	24	15	9	5	15	70
11	(Sweden) Mattias Ekström			19		1				2				55
12	(United Kingdom) Andy Scott	13	10				20	12	12	31	24	11	9	46
13	(United States) Tanner Foust		5		1			18				DNP		42
14	(Republic of Ireland) Derek Tohill	10	24	25	8	29	24	14	20	20	20	10	13	35
15	(Sweden) Johan Kristoffersson					20	DSQ			8	5			33
16	(United States) Ken Block			3					4			DNP		32
17	(France) Davy Jeanney		25			23	11	10	13	23	15			27
17=	(France) Jérôme Grosset-Janin		8	24			17		7	14	31			27
19	(Sweden) Richard Göransson										2	9		26
20	(Sweden) Peter Hedström		32	12		19	9				23			24
20=	(Norway) Daniel Holten			9		9								24
22	(Sweden) Kevin Eriksson												3	20
22=	(Sweden) Sebastian Eriksson					6								20
24	(Poland) Krzysztof Skorupski	18	27	18	4									19
25	(United Kingdom) Andrew Jordan		3											17
25=	(Belgium) Koen Pauwels	6	14	32			21		29	24				17
27	(Norway) Alexander Hvaal	9	17	23	14	15								14
27=	(Sweden) Emil Öhman		18	10			13				16			14
27=	(Norway) Tommy Rustad		21	16		18	22			9	14			14
30	(Finland) Joni-Pekka Rajala				6	22								13
30=	(Canada) Patrick Carpentier							6						13
30=	(Finland) Joni Wiman							9						13
33	(Belgium) Jos Jansen	12	23	27	18	36	28	15	25	29	35	16	14	12
34	(Austria) Manfred Stohl												10	9
34=	(Sweden) Edward Sandström						12		14		12			9
34=	(Italy) Gigi Galli									12				9
37	(Sweden) Ramona Karlsson	11	30	30		26								8
37=	(Canada) Jacques Villeneuve	17		14	16	17	14	16			18			8
37=	(Sweden) Per-Gunnar Andersson									13		13		8
37=	(Argentina) Miguel Baldoni												12	8
37=	(Republic of Ireland) Oliver O'Donovan		37										11	8
42	(Norway) Sverre Isachsen							13						7
42=	(France) Gaëtan Sérazin								12					7
42=	(Norway) Frode Holte		36	22		24				12				7
45	(France) Fabien Pailler		13						18					5
46	(Portugal) Joaquim Santos	14												3
46=	(France) Alexandre Theuil	16	15				23		31	41	17			3
46=	(Poland) Bohdan Ludwiczak	15	34						37	36	32	17	16	3
46=	(United Kingdom) Marc Scott											14		3
46=	(Sweden) Lukas Walfridson		16	15		28	27				36			3
51	(France) Jean-Baptiste Dubourg								15					2
51=	(Norway) Lars Øivind Enerberg											15		2
51=	(United Kingdom) Liam Doran	19	20	DSQ	12	5	10						17	2
51=	(Finland) Aki Karttunen				15									2
55	(Sweden) Eric Färén		22			16								1
55=	(Belgium) François Duval						16							1
57	(Finland) Riku Tahko				17									0
57=	(Norway) Ole Christian Veiby					21	18							0
57=	(Czech Republic) Pavel Koutný		19	26			26				26			0
57=	(Estonia) Andri Õun				19									0
57=	(Finland) Teemu Pätsi				20	30								0
57=	(Finland) Atro Määttä				21									0
57=	(Norway) Ole Kristian Nøttveit			21										0
57=	(Finland) Silvo Viitanen				22									0
57=	(Estonia) Valdur Reinsalu				23									0
57=	(Germany) Markus Winkelhock				24									0
57=	(Norway) Stian Haugan					25								0
57=	(Belgium) Michaël De Keersmaecker						25							0
57=	(Norway) Tore Kristoffersen			34		27					34			0
57=	(United Kingdom) Julian Godfrey		28											0
57=	(Norway) Morten Bergminrud			28							22			0
57=	(Norway) Stein Egil Jenssen			29										0
57=	(Belgium) Jochen Coox		31											0
57=	(Sweden) Fredrik Tiger					31								0
57=	(Belgium) Patrick Van Mechelen						30							0
57=	(Sweden) Mats Öhman		33	31						29				0
57=	(Norway) Ole Håbjørg			33		32								0
57=	(Belgium) Ronny Scheveneels						31							0
57=	(Russia) Roman Stepanenko					33					37			0
57=	(France) Jean-Luc Pailler		35											0
57=	(Germany) René Münnich					35					25			0
57=	(Norway) Ludvig Hunsbedt					37								0
57=	(Norway) Åke Holtet					38								0
84	(Estonia) Sten Oja							17				18		-5
85	(Norway) Tord Linnerud		26	17		12	19			25	21			-9
Pos.	Driver	POR (Portugal)	GBR (United Kingdom)	NOR (Norway)	FIN (Finland)	SWE (Sweden)	BEL (Belgium)	CAN (Canada)	FRA (France)	GER (Germany)	ITA (Italy)	TUR (Turkey)	ARG (Argentina)	Points

=== FIA World Rallycross Championship for Teams ===
Pos.	Driver	No.	POR (Portugal)	GBR (United Kingdom)	NOR (Norway)	FIN (Finland)	SWE (Sweden)	BEL (Belgium)	CAN (Canada)	FRA (France)	GER (Germany)	ITA (Italy)	TUR (Turkey)	ARG (Argentina)	Points
1	(Sweden) Ford Olsbergs MSE	13	2	1	12	2	2	30	8	9	11	6	1	6	409
1	(Sweden) Ford Olsbergs MSE	15	3	7	1	3	4	9	4	2	16	11	7	2	409
2	(Sweden) Marklund Motorsport	57	4	4	8	7	8	1	5	10	5	8	3	5	394
2	(Sweden) Marklund Motorsport	92	5	12	9	5	14	5	2	8	17	6	4	7	394
3	(Sweden) Team Peugeot-Hansen	1	7	29	4	11	7	8	3	6	7	4	8	8	351
3	(Sweden) Team Peugeot-Hansen	3	8	11	6	9	11	2	7	3	6	1	2	4	351
4	(Norway) PSRX	11	1	6	2	10	3	4	1	1	1	3	6	1	281
4	(Norway) PSRX	12	9	17	23	14	15								281
4	(Norway) PSRX	97							17						281
5	(United Kingdom) Monster Energy World RX	27					23	11	10						83
5	(United Kingdom) Monster Energy World RX	33	19	20	7	12	5	10							83
5	(United Kingdom) Monster Energy World RX	44	18	27	19	4									83
5	(United Kingdom) Monster Energy World RX	88							11			9			83
6	(United Kingdom) Albatec Racing	25	13	10				21	16			18			25
6	(United Kingdom) Albatec Racing	26	17		15	16	17	15	12			24			25
6	(United Kingdom) Albatec Racing	27		25								15			25

== See also ==
- FIA European Rallycross Championship
