= FIA World Rallycross Championship =

Rallycross series

- Category: Rallycross
- Country: International
- Inaugural season: 2014
- Folded: 2025
- Tire suppliers: Hoosier
- Last Drivers' champion: (Sweden) Johan Kristoffersson
- Last Teams' champion: (Sweden) Kristoffersson Motorsport
- Official website: fiaworldrallycross.com

The FIA World Rallycross Championship (official abbreviation World RX or WRX) was a rallycross series organised and promoted by the FIA. The championship was cancelled in 2025 and was replaced with the European Rallycross Championship for the 2026 season.

== Format ==
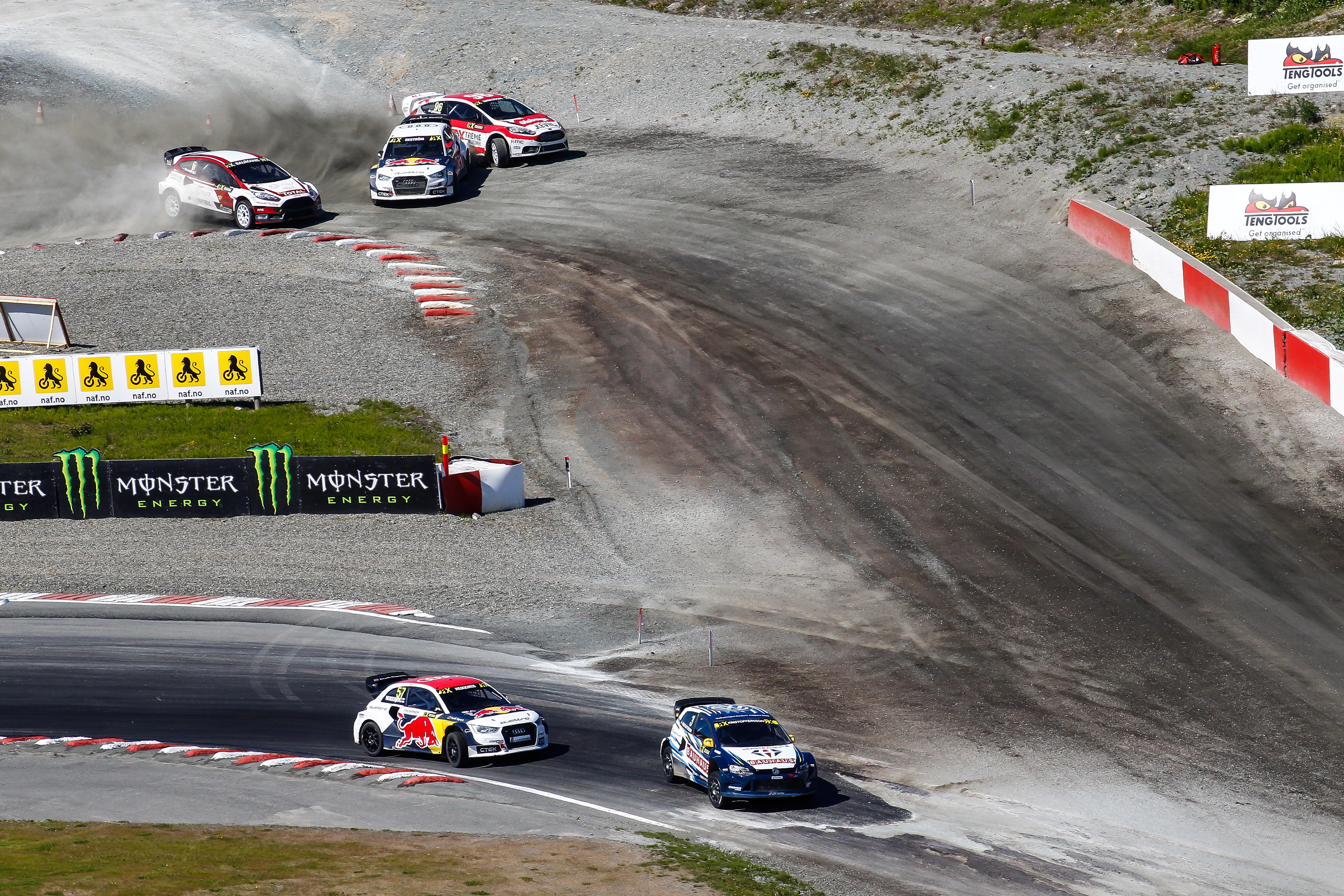
Regular lap vs. Joker lap (2016 World RX of Norway)

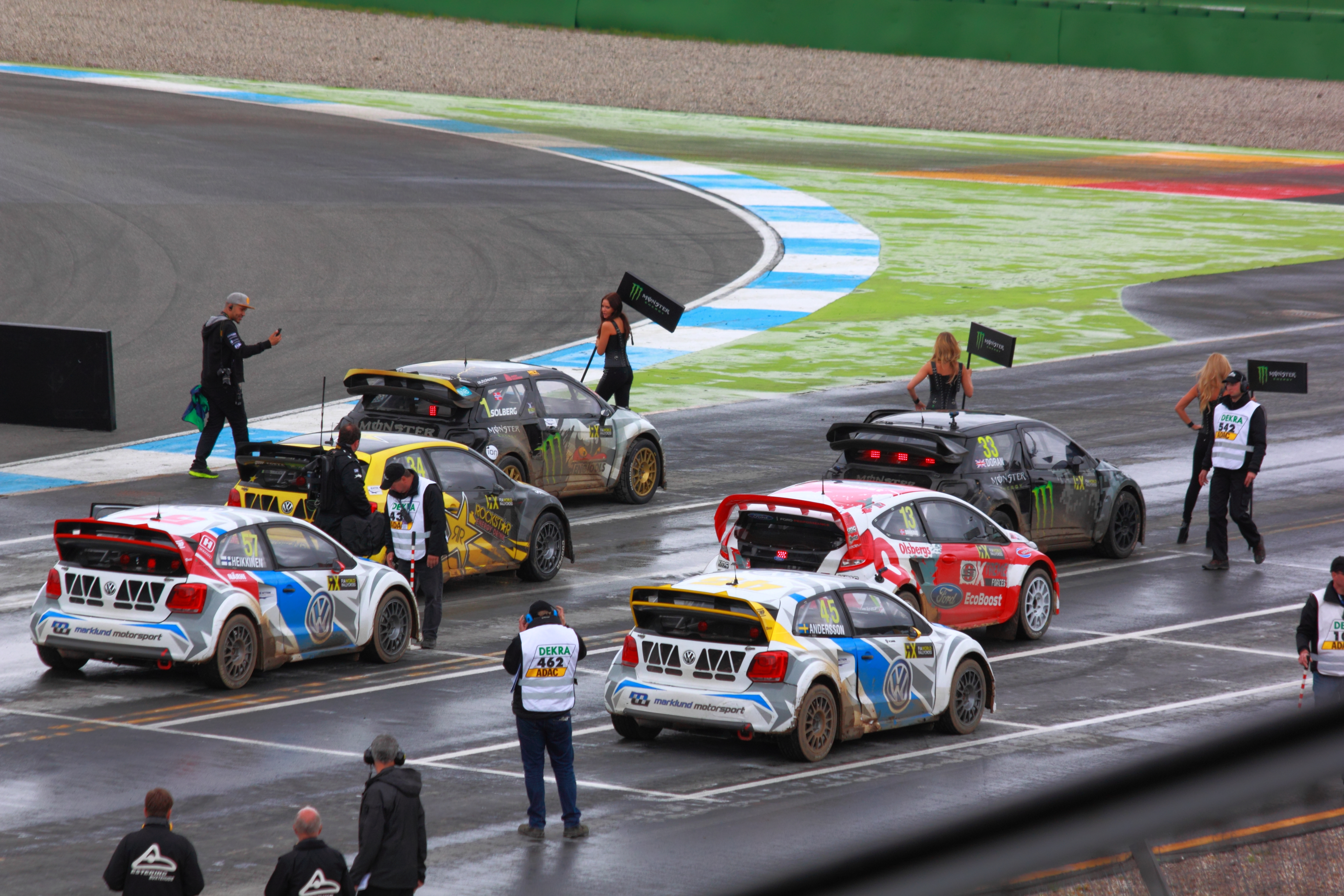
Cars line up on the grid before a Semi-Final

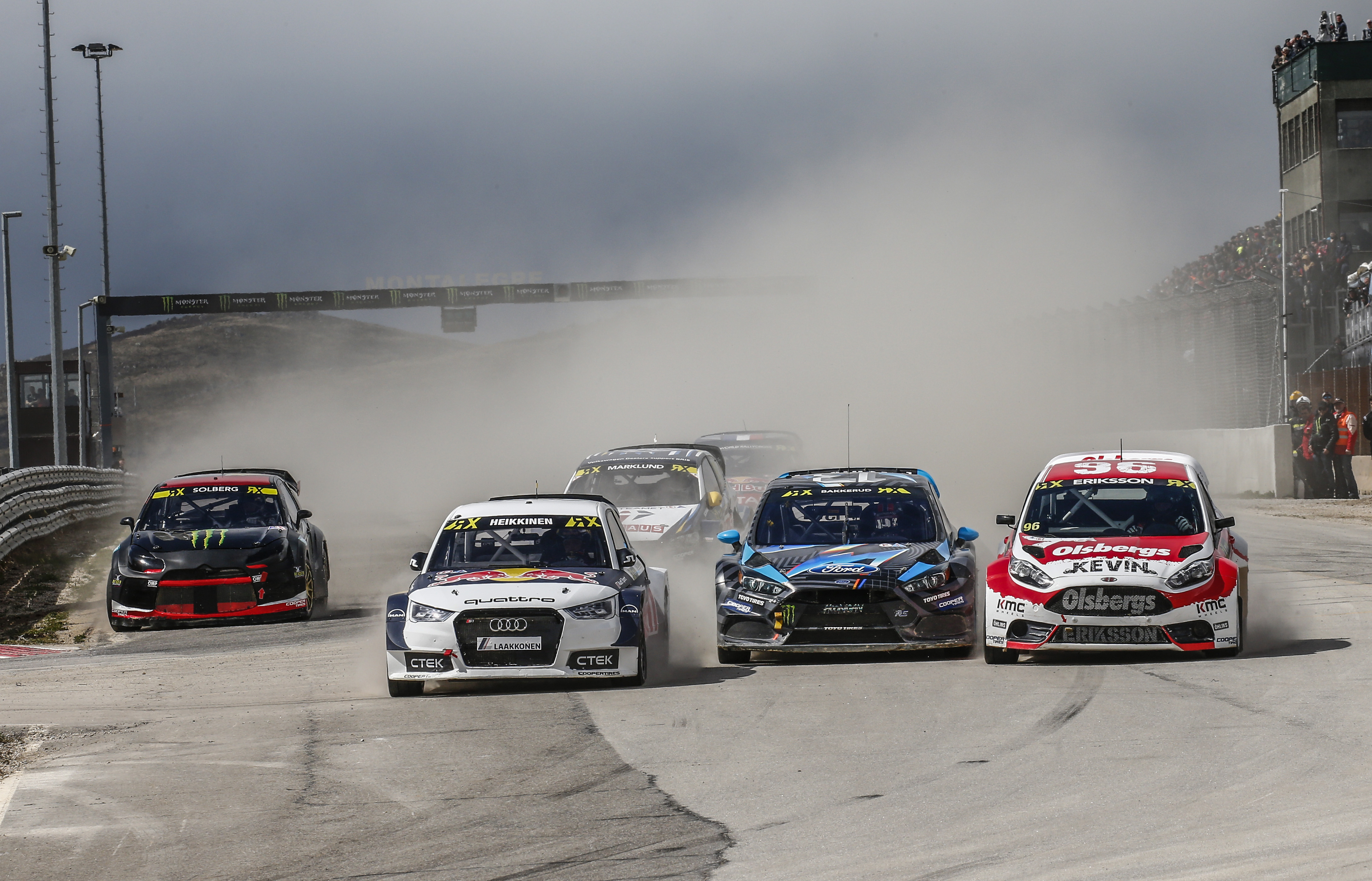
Semi-Final 2 at the 2016 World RX of Portugal

The series currently consists of twelve two-day events driven on closed circuits with mixed surfaces (mostly asphalt and gravel). Each event consists of:

- 4 Qualifying heats. In each of the 4 series there are smaller races containing 3 to 5 cars, and the driver with the fastest overall race time after 4 laps (including one Joker Lap) is declared the qualifying winner of Q1, Q2, Q3 and/or Q4. Drivers earn 'intermediate points' based on their positions. After the 4 qualifying series, the points are added up and the 12 drivers with the most points in the 'intermediate standings' move into the next round.
- 2 Semi-Finals. 6 cars race in each of both semi-finals, which are run over 6 laps (incl. one Joker Lap). The top 3 drivers in each semi-final move into the final round.
- Final. Like the semi-finals, this race is contested by 6 cars over 6 laps (incl. one Joker Lap). The winner of the final is deemed to be the event winner. However, the final winner has not necessarily claimed the most championship points from the whole event.

== Categories ==
During the first FIA World Rallycross Championship season in 2014, two classes were run, Supercar (later RX1) and the supporting RX Lites series (later RX2). RX Lites teams raced identical cars prepared by OlsbergsMSE. The World RX Championship series was introduced to distinguish it from the FIA European Rallycross Championship, which has been contested since 1976 and was renamed in March 2013.

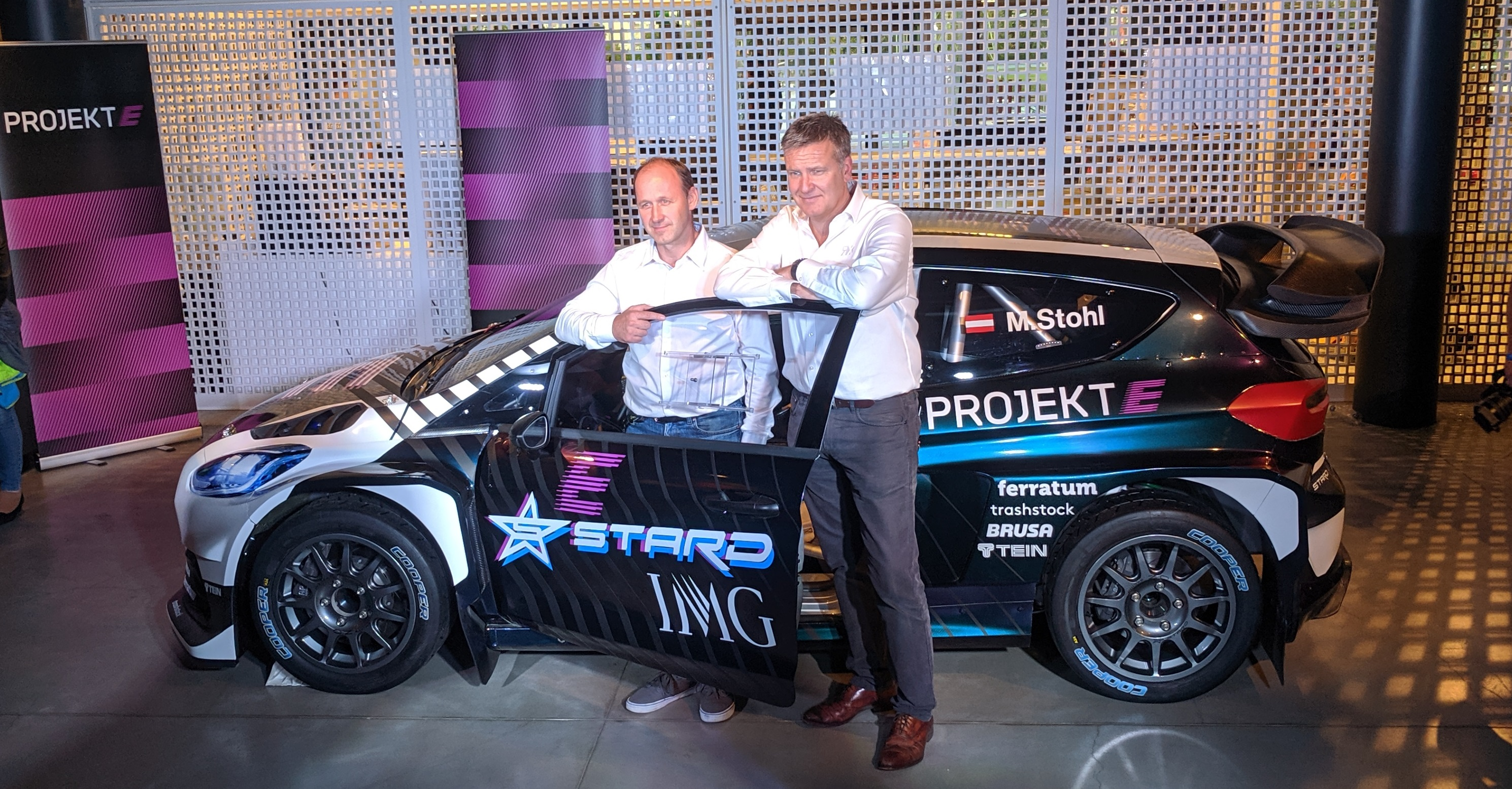
The Projekt E electric rallycross car

An electric category was planned to be introduced in 2020, but it was announced in August 2018 that the introduction of a fully electric Championship would be delayed until 2021 to allow manufacturers more time to submit an interest to join following the rules change. Instead, the Projekt E class was run in 2020 as a special parallel series using a spec racer. The Projekt E spec electric rallycross car was revealed in September 2019 at the Riga Motor Museum in Latvia. FIA announced in August 2020 that RX2e would be replacing the RX2 category for the 2021 season. The top World Rallycross Championship series switched to electric cars (RX1e) in August 2022, making World RX an all-electric race series. In 2024, ICE cars were reintroduced into the top level World Rallycross Championship to race alongside the electric RX1e vehicles.

In 2025, there was one World Rallycross Championship and two European Rallycross Championships:

1. FIA World Rallycross Championship, using electric cars from the RX1e & internal combustion engined cars from the RX1 class.
2. FIA Euro RX1 Rallycross Championship, using cars from the RX1 class
3. FIA Euro RX3 Rallycross Championship, using cars from the RX3 class

The RX2e class was discontinued after the 2024 season.

FIA World Rallycross class summary
Class	Output		Weight	Years
Class	Power	Torque	Weight	Years
RX1 (Note: Formerly Supercar, 2014–20)	430–450 kW (570–600 hp)	840–920 N⋅m (620–680 lb⋅ft)	1,300 kg (2,900 lb)	2014–2021, 2024–2025
RX1e	510 kW (680 hp)	880 N⋅m (650 lbf⋅ft)	1,300–1,330 kg (2,870–2,930 lb)	2022–2025
RX2 (Note: Formerly RX Lites, 2014–16)	230–240 kW (310–320 hp)	300 N⋅m (220 lbf⋅ft)	1,100 kg (2,400 lb)	2014–2020
RX2e	270 kW (360 hp)	510 N⋅m (380 lbf⋅ft)	1,290 kg (2,840 lb)	2021–2024
RX3 (Note: Formerly Super 1600, 2001–10)	160–190 kW (220–250 hp)	190–200 N⋅m (140–150 lbf⋅ft)	920–1,000 kg (2,030–2,200 lb)	Euro only (Note: Exclusively contested in Euro RX)
Projekt E	450 kW (600 hp)			2020

=== Internal combustion ===
The top-level RX1 Supercars division use 2.0 L, turbocharged, four-cylinder engines, which produce approximately 570–600 hp (430–450 kW), and between 620–680 lb⋅ft (840–920 N⋅m) of torque, while using a 45 mm (1.8 in) intake restrictor. The engines run 50 psi (3.4 bar) of boost pressure, and completely unrestricted, are capable of making about 1,000 hp (750 kW) and 1,100 lb⋅ft (1,500 N⋅m) of torque. They are four-wheel-drive, and use a Sadev 6-speed sequential gearbox. They use launch control, and are capable of accelerating from 0–60 mph (0–97 km/h) in under 2 seconds; which is faster than a Formula One car. Fully prepared, the cars weigh about 1,300 kg (2,900 lb), including the driver, and with oil and fuel.

The second-tier RX2 Supercar Lites division uses a 16-valve, 2.4 L, naturally aspirated, Ford Duratec inline-four engine, making between 310–320 hp (230–240 kW) and 300 N⋅m (220 lbf⋅ft) of torque. They are also four-wheel-drive, and also use a 6-speed sequential gearbox. They have a minimum weight of 1,100 kg (2,400 lb), including the driver.

The RX3 (formerly Super 1600) class uses 1.6 L (1600 cc), naturally aspirated, four-cylinder engines; generating between 220–250 hp (160–190 kW) and between 190–200 N⋅m (140–150 lbf⋅ft) of torque. They are only two-wheel-drive (front-wheel-drive), and use either a 5- or 6-speed sequential gearbox. They weigh between 920–1,000 kg (2,030–2,200 lb) including the driver, depending on how many valves per cylinder the engine has. They are capable of a 0–60 mph (0–97 km/h) time in just under 4.5 seconds.

=== Electric ===
The top-level all-electric RX1e Supercar division uses two electric motors, each producing 340 hp (250 kW) and 440 N⋅m (320 lbf⋅ft) of torque; for a total of 680 hp (510 kW) and 880 N⋅m (650 lbf⋅ft) of instant torque. They are four-wheel-drive, weigh between 1,300–1,330 kg (2,870–2,930 lb), and can accelerate from 0–60 mph (0–97 km/h) in 1.8 seconds.

The second-tier all-electric RX2e division uses two electric motors, each producing 167.5 hp (124.9 kW) and 255 N⋅m (188 lbf⋅ft) of torque; for a total of 335 hp (250 kW) and 510 N⋅m (380 lbf⋅ft) of torque. They are also four-wheel-drive, and weigh 1,290 kg (2,840 lb).

Projekt E used electric powertrain kits supplied by STARD. The first car used a Ford Fiesta bodyshell; the STARD ElectRX was a three-motor, all-wheel drive car with 450 kW (600 hp) combined output.

== Points system ==
Points on season 2025 are scored as follows:

Position	1st	2nd	3rd	4th	5th	6th	7th	8th	9th	10th	11th	12th	13th	14th	15th	16th	17th	18th
Final points	25	20	17	15	14	13	12	11	10	9	8	7	6	5	4	3	2	1
Heat ranking	3	2	1															

2022-2024 World Championship Points are scored as follows:

Position	1st	2nd	3rd	4th	5th	6th	7th	8th	9th	10th	11th	12th	13th	14th	15th
Points	20	16	13	12	11	10	9	8	7	6	5	4	3	2	1

2014-2021 World Championship points were scored as follows:

Points Scale	Position															
Points Scale	1st	2nd	3rd	4th	5th	6th	7th	8th	9th	10th	11th	12th	13th	14th	15th	16th
Heats	16	15	14	13	12	11	10	9	8	7	6	5	4	3	2	1
Semi-Finals	6	5	4	3	2	1										
Final	8	5	4	3	2	1										

- A red background denotes drivers who did not advance from the round

== Champions ==
FIA World Rallycross Champions (Supercar / RX1 / RX1e)
Season	Championship for Drivers			Championship for Teams	
Season	Driver	Team	Car	Team	Car
2014	(Norway) Petter Solberg	(Sweden) PSRX	(France) Citroën DS3	(Sweden) Olsbergs MSE	(United States) Ford Fiesta ST
2015	(Norway) Petter Solberg	(Sweden) SDRX	(France) Citroën DS3	(Sweden) Team Peugeot-Hansen	(France) Peugeot 208
2016	(Sweden) Mattias Ekström	(Sweden) EKS RX	(Germany) Audi S1	(Sweden) EKS RX	(Germany) Audi S1
2017	(Sweden) Johan Kristoffersson	PSRX Volkswagen Sweden	(Germany) Volkswagen Polo GTI	PSRX Volkswagen Sweden	(Germany) Volkswagen Polo GTI
2018	(Sweden) Johan Kristoffersson	PSRX Volkswagen Sweden	(Germany) Volkswagen Polo R	PSRX Volkswagen Sweden	(Germany) Volkswagen Polo R
2019	(Sweden) Timmy Hansen	(Sweden) Team Hansen MJP	(France) Peugeot 208	(Sweden) Team Hansen MJP	(France) Peugeot 208
2020	(Sweden) Johan Kristoffersson	(Sweden) Volkswagen Dealerteam BAUHAUS	(Germany) Volkswagen Polo	(Sweden) KYB Team JC	(Germany) Audi S1
2021	(Sweden) Johan Kristoffersson	(Sweden) EKS KYB JC	(Germany) Audi S1	(Sweden) Hansen World RX Team	(France) Peugeot 208
2022	(Sweden) Johan Kristoffersson	(Sweden) Kristoffersson Motorsport	(Germany) Volkswagen Polo RX1e	(Sweden) Kristoffersson Motorsport	(Germany) Volkswagen Polo RX1e
2023	(Sweden) Johan Kristoffersson	(Sweden) Volkswagen Dealerteam BAUHAUS	(Germany) Volkswagen Polo RX1e	(Sweden) Volkswagen Dealerteam BAUHAUS	(Germany) Volkswagen Polo RX1e
2024	(Sweden) Johan Kristoffersson	(Sweden) KMS - HORSE Powertrain	(Germany) Volkswagen Polo KMS 601 RX	(Sweden) KMS - HORSE Powertrain	(Germany) Volkswagen Polo KMS 601 RX
2025	(Sweden) Johan Kristoffersson	(Sweden) Kristoffersson Motorsport	(Germany) Volkswagen Polo RX1e	(Sweden) Kristoffersson Motorsport	(Germany) Volkswagen Polo RX1e

FIA RX Lites / RX2 / RX2e Champions
Season	Championship for Drivers		
Season	Driver	Team	Car
2014	(Sweden) Kevin Eriksson	(Sweden) Olsbergs MSE	OMSE RX Lite Car
2015	(Sweden) Kevin Hansen	(Sweden) Hansen Junior Team	OMSE RX Lite Car
2016	(France) Cyril Raymond	(France) Cyril Raymond	OMSE RX Lite Car
2017	(France) Cyril Raymond	(France) Cyril Raymond	OMSE RX2 Car
2018	(Sweden) Oliver Eriksson	(Sweden) Olsbergs MSE	OMSE RX2 Car
2019	(Sweden) Oliver Eriksson	(Sweden) Olsbergs MSE	OMSE RX2 Car
2020	(Norway) Henrik Krogstad	(Sweden) Olsbergs MSE	OMSE RX2 Car
2021	(Belgium) Guillaume De Ridder	(Belgium) Guillaume De Ridder	ZEROID X1
2022	(Belgium) Viktor Vranckx	(Belgium) Bert Vranckx	ZEROID X1
2023 (Note: The 2023 RX2e series was part of the European championship, rather than the world championship as it had been previously.)	(Sweden) Nils Andersson	(Sweden) Team E	ZEROID X1
2024 (Note: The 2024 RX2e series was part of the European championship.)	(Sweden) Nils Andersson	(Sweden) Team E	ZEROID X1

== Promotion ==
From the inaugural season in 2014 to 2020, IMG Motorsport fulfilled the role of promoter. Following this, Rallycross Promoter GmbH (founded by Red Bull and KW25) was the series promoter until withdrawing at the end of 2024. After tendering for a new promoter the FIA confirmed in March 2025 that they would promote the series in house.

== Statistics ==
=== Event wins by driver ===
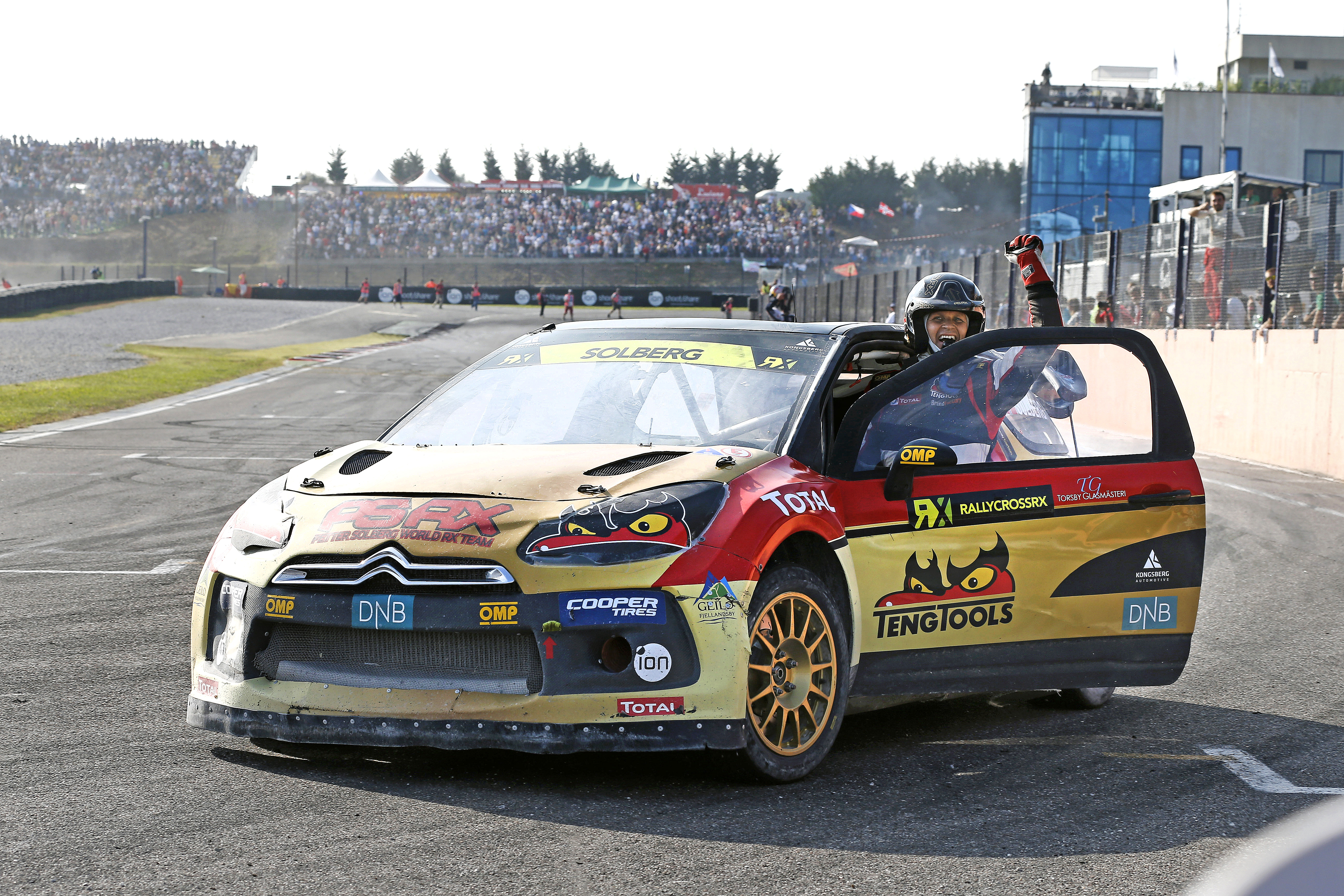
The drivers champion of the first two seasons, Petter Solberg

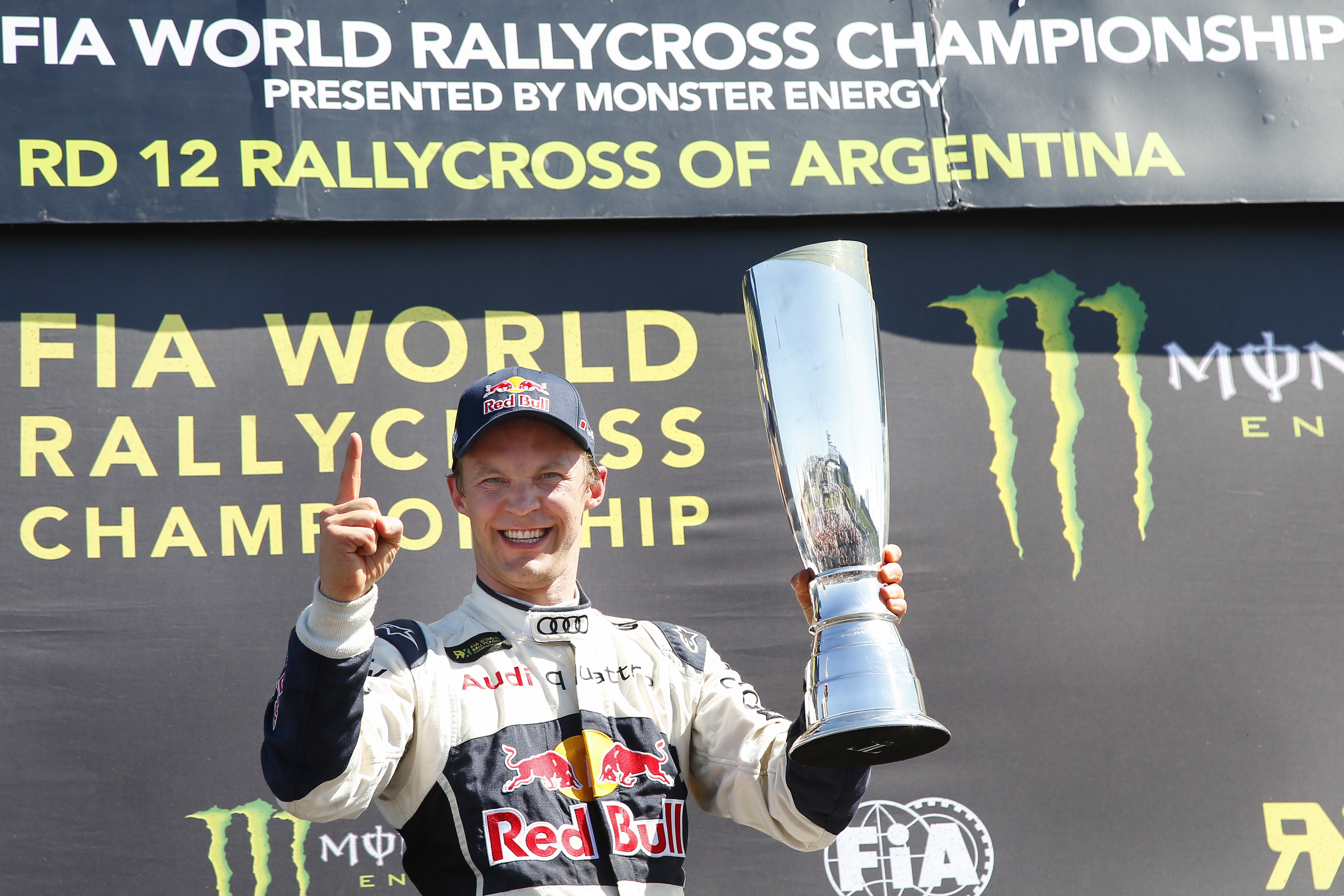
2016 champion Mattias Ekström

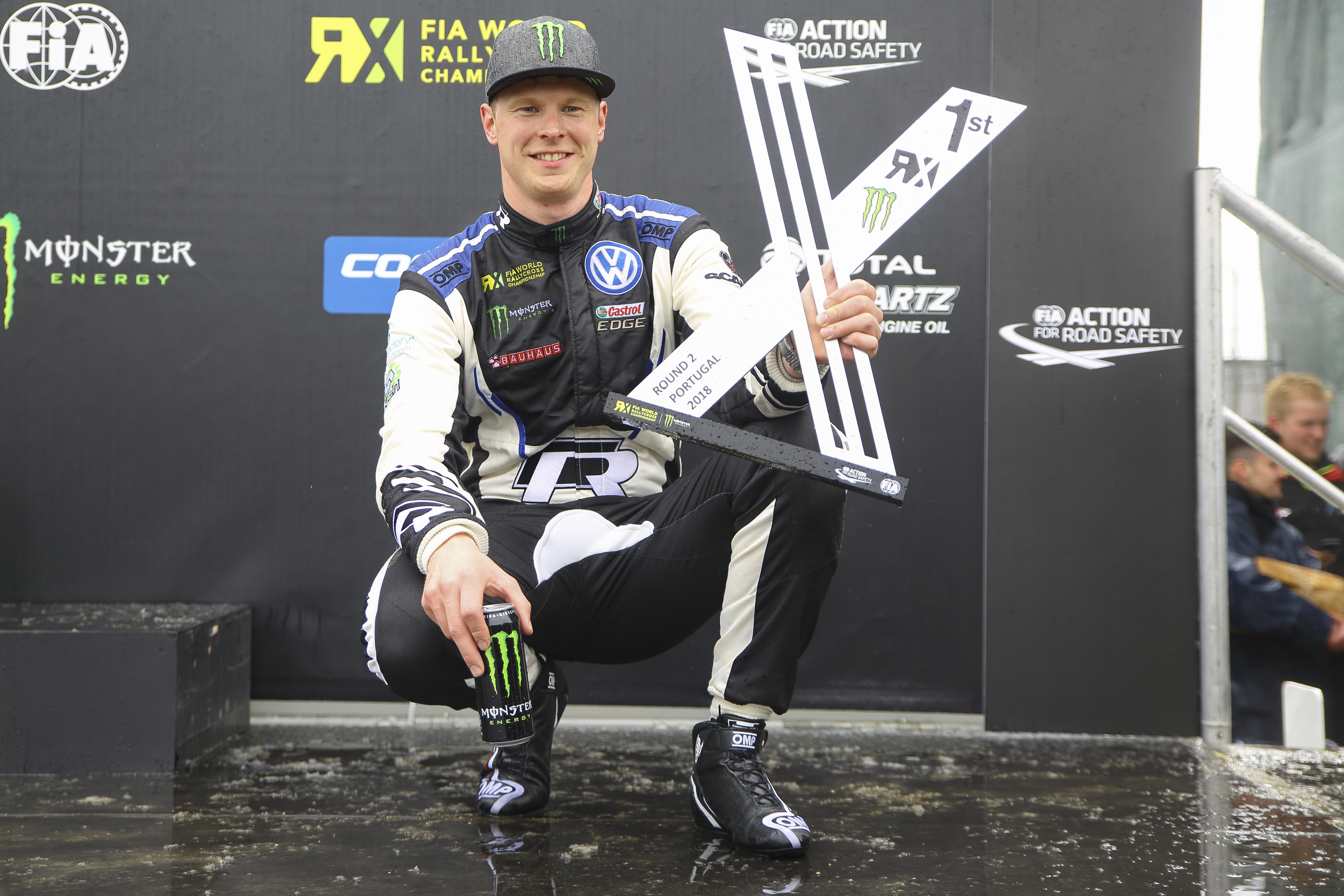
Eight time champion Johan Kristoffersson

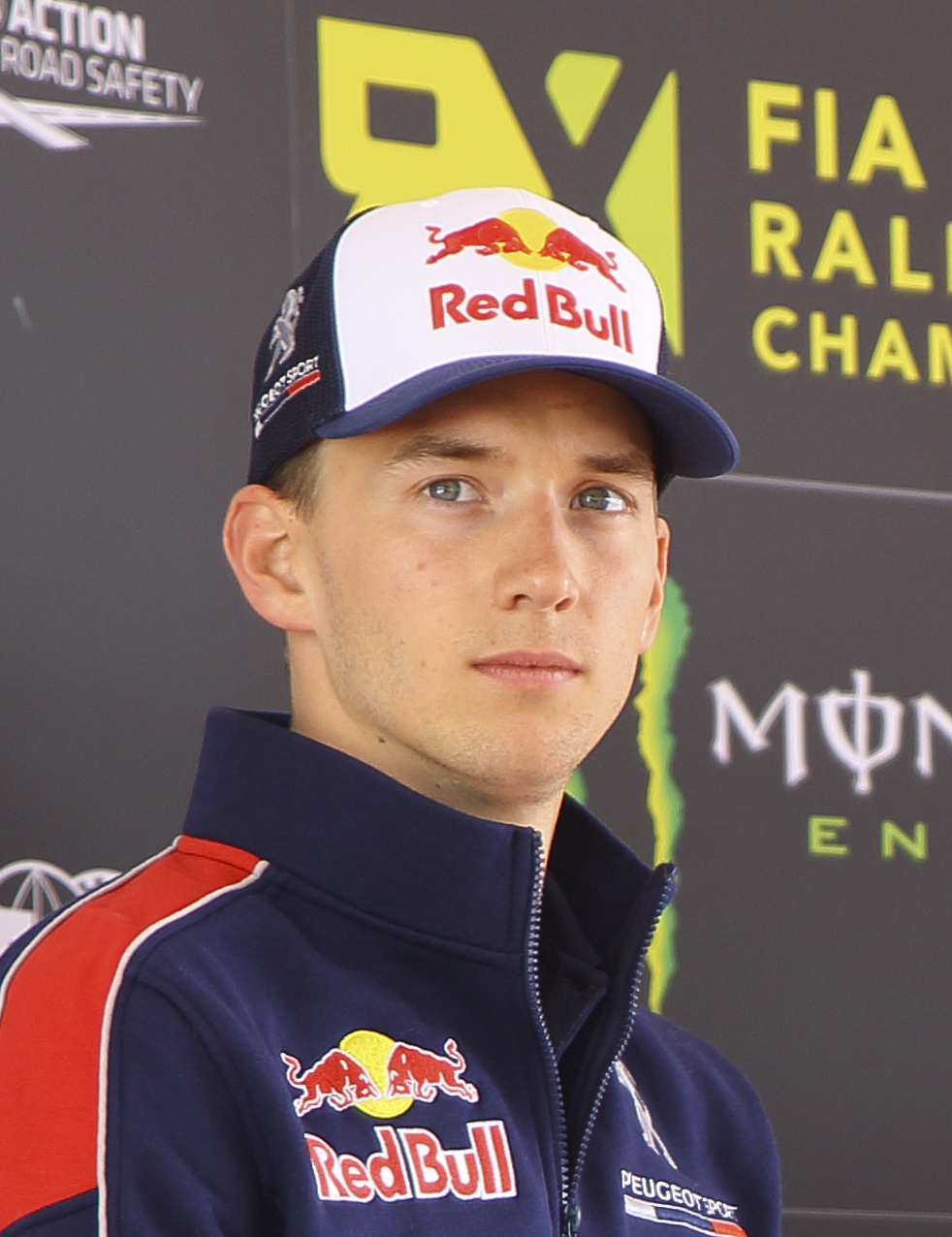
2019 champion Timmy Hansen

Key

Driver is a World Champion

Wins	Driver	First win	Last win
48	(Sweden) Johan Kristoffersson	2015 World RX of Portugal	2025 World RX of Turkey 1
14	(Sweden) Timmy Hansen	2014 World RX of Italy	2024 World RX of Benelux
12	(Sweden) Mattias Ekström	2014 World RX of Sweden	2020 World RX of Latvia
10	(Norway) Petter Solberg	2014 World RX of Portugal	2017 World RX of Great Britain
9	(Finland) Niclas Grönholm	2019 World RX of Norway	2025 World RX of Portugal
7	(Norway) Andreas Bakkerud	2014 World RX of Great Britain	2019 World RX of Canada
4	(Sweden) Kevin Hansen	2019 World RX of Abu Dhabi	2024 World RX of Portugal
3	(Norway) Ole Christian Veiby	2024 World RX of Turkey	2025 World RX of Turkey 2
2	(France) Davy Jeanney	2015 World RX of Germany	2015 World RX of Canada
2	(Finland) Toomas Heikkinen	2014 World RX of Belgium	2015 World RX of Belgium
2	(France) Sébastien Loeb	2016 World RX of Latvia	2018 World RX of Belgium
1	(Latvia) Reinis Nitišs	2014 World RX of Norway	
1	(United States) Tanner Foust	2014 World RX of Finland	
1	(Sweden) Robin Larsson	2015 World RX of Argentina	
1	(Sweden) Kevin Eriksson	2016 World RX of Germany	
1	(Russia) Timur Timerzyanov	2019 World RX of Belgium	
1	(Sweden) Sebastian Eriksson	2019 World RX of Sweden	
1	(Germany) Timo Scheider	2023 World RX of South Africa	
1	(Finland) Juha Rytkönen	2024 World RX of Turkey	

=== Event podiums by driver ===
Podiums	Driver
64	(Sweden) Johan Kristoffersson
49	(Sweden) Timmy Hansen
30	(Norway) Petter Solberg
30	(Norway) Andreas Bakkerud
27	(Sweden) Mattias Ekström
24	(Sweden) Kevin Hansen
21	(Finland) Niclas Grönholm
17	(France) Sébastien Loeb
15	(Norway) Ole Christian Veiby
8	(Finland) Toomas Heikkinen
8	(Latvia) Reinis Nitišs
6	(Sweden) Robin Larsson
6	(Russia) Timur Timerzyanov
6	(Germany) Timo Scheider
4	(Sweden) Anton Marklund
4	(Sweden) Gustav Bergström
3	(France) Davy Jeanney
3	(Sweden) Klara Andersson
2	(United States) Ken Block
2	(United States) Tanner Foust
2	(Sweden) Kevin Eriksson
2	(Latvia) Jānis Baumanis
2	(Hungary) Krisztián Szabó
2	(Finland) Juha Rytkönen
1	(United States) Mitchell deJong
1	(United Kingdom) Andrew Jordan
1	(United Kingdom) Liam Doran
1	(France) Jean-Baptiste Dubourg
1	(France) Jerome Grosset-Janin
1	(Finland) Joni Wiman
1	(Sweden) Richard Göransson
1	(Sweden) Sebastian Eriksson
1	(Netherlands) Kevin Abbring
1	(Switzerland) Yury Belevskiy
1	(Republic of Ireland) Patrick O'Donovan
1	(Hungary) Jankó Wieszt

=== Event wins by car ===
Wins	Car
50	(Germany) Volkswagen Polo
21	(France) Peugeot 208
16	(Germany) Audi S1
9	(France) Citroën DS3
7	(South Korea) Hyundai i20
6	(United States) Ford Fiesta
4	(Spain) ZEROID X1
3	(United States) Ford Focus
3	(Sweden) PWR RX1e
1	(Germany) Audi A1

=== Event wins by manufacturer ===
Wins	Manufacturer
50	(Germany) Volkswagen
21	(France) Peugeot
17	(Germany) Audi
9	(France) Citroën
9	(United States) Ford
7	(South Korea) Hyundai
4	(Spain) QEV Technologies
3	(Sweden) PWR Racing

== See also ==
- FIA European Rallycross Championship
- Dirt Rally, the first videogame to be an officially licensed FIA World Rallycross Championship game.
