= Davy Jeanney =

French rallycross driver (born 1986)

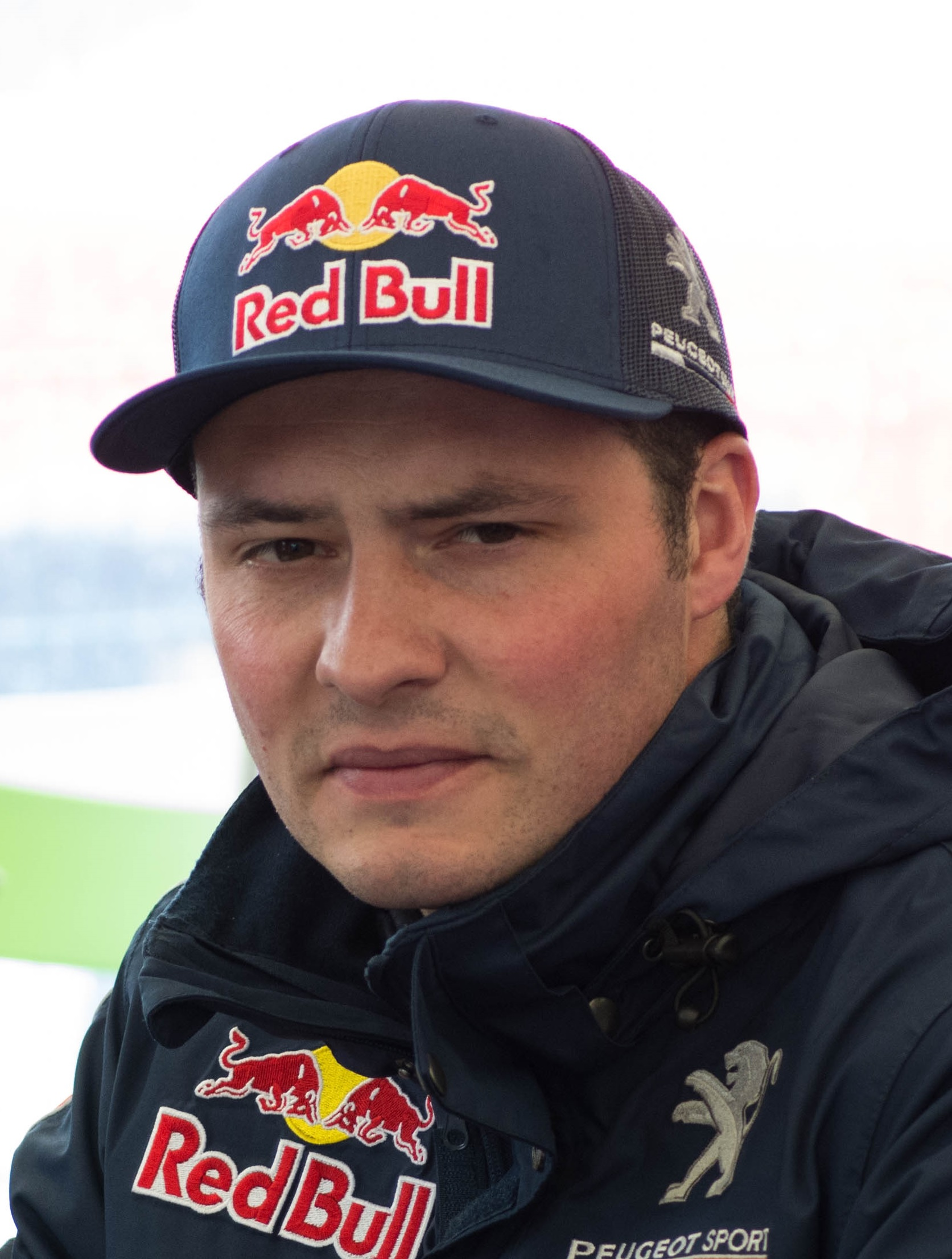
- Jeanney at the 2016 World RX of Portugal
- Nationality: French
- Born: 6 December 1986 (age 39) Romorantin-Lanthenay, Centre-Val de Loire

FIA World Rallycross Championship
- Years active: 2014–2017
- Former teams: DA Racing; Peugeot-Hansen Academy; Team Peugeot-Hansen; Monster Energy World RX; Albatec Racing
- Starts: 34
- Wins: 2
- Podiums: 3
- Best finish: 5th in 2015
- Finished last season: 16th

FIA ERX Supercar Championship
- Years active: 2011–2014
- Former teams: LD Motorsports; Albatec Racing
- Starts: 32
- Wins: 0
- Podiums: 10
- Best finish: 2nd in 2013

Davy Jeanney (born 6 December 1986) is a French rallycross driver. He was the 2010 French rallycross champion and was runner-up in the 2013 European Rallycross Championship season in Supercars.

After running in selected rounds for the 2014 FIA World Rallycross Championship, it was announced for 2015 that Jeanney would be driving full-time for Team Peugeot-Hansen in their Peugeot 208 WRX alongside Timmy Hansen. He took the first win for a Frenchman in the category at the 2015 World RX of Germany.

== Racing record ==
=== Complete FIA European Rallycross Championship results ===
==== Division 2 ====
Year	Entrant	Car	1	2	3	4	5	6	7	8	9	10	11	ERX	Points
2008	JSA Compétition	Peugeot 206	POR	FRA; 6	HUN	AUT	NOR	SWE	BEL	NED	CZE	POL	GER	26th	11

==== Division 1A ====
Year	Entrant	Car	1	2	3	4	5	6	7	8	9	10	ERX	Points
2009	JSA Compétition	Peugeot 206	GBR	POR	FRA; 17	HUN	AUT	SWE	BEL	GER	POL	CZE	NC	0

==== Division 1 ====
Year	Entrant	Car	1	2	3	4	5	6	7	8	9	10	ERX	Points
2010	JSA Compétition	Citroën Xsara T16 4x4	POR	FRA; 4	GBR	HUN	SWE	FIN	BEL	GER	POL	CZE	23rd	13

==== Supercar ====
Year	Entrant	Car	1	2	3	4	5	6	7	8	9	10	ERX	Points
2011	Davy Jeanney	Citroën C4 T16 4x4	GBR; 3	POR; 8	FRA; 16	NOR; 12	SWE; 11	BEL; 18	NED; 12	AUT; 6	POL; 2	CZE	10th	68
2012	Davy Jeanney	Citroën C4 T16 4x4	GBR; Ret	FRA; 7	AUT; 3	HUN; 5	NOR; 12	SWE; Ret	BEL; 3	NED; 2	FIN; 8	GER; 2	4th	100
2013	Davy Jeanney	Citroën C4 T16 4x4	GBR; 6	POR; 5	HUN; 3	FIN; 8	NOR; 3	SWE; 8	FRA; 3	AUT; 3	GER; 7		2nd	156
2014	Albatec Racing	Peugeot 208 GTi	GBR; 14	NOR									9th	27
2014	LD Motorsports	Citroën DS3			BEL; 4	GER; 15	ITA; 8						9th	27

=== Complete FIA World Rallycross Championship results ===
==== Supercar/RX1 ====
Year	Entrant	Car	1	2	3	4	5	6	7	8	9	10	11	12	13	WRX	Points
2014	Albatec Racing	Peugeot 208 GTi	POR	GBR; 25	NOR	FIN										17th	27
2014	Monster Energy World RX	Citroën DS3					SWE; 23	BEL; 11	CAN; 10	FRA; 13	GER; 23	ITA; 15	TUR	ARG		17th	27
2015	Team Peugeot-Hansen	Peugeot 208 WRX	POR; 5	HOC; 10	BEL; 9	GBR; 11	GER; 1	SWE; 12	CAN; 1	NOR; 2	FRA; 11	BAR; 4	TUR; 5	ITA; 10	ARG; 8	5th	201
2016	Peugeot-Hansen Academy	Peugeot 208 WRX	POR; 11	HOC; 9	BEL; 11	GBR; 13	NOR; 11	SWE; 12	CAN	FRA; 9	BAR; 12	LAT; 10	GER; 10	ARG		12th	86
2017	DA Racing	Peugeot 208	BAR	POR	HOC	BEL	GBR	NOR	SWE	CAN	FRA	LAT	GER; 18	RSA		30th	0
2018	Davy Jeanney	Peugeot 208	BAR	POR	BEL	GBR	NOR	SWE	CAN	FRA; 20	LAT	USA	GER	RSA		33rd	0
2021	Davy Jeanney	Hyundai i20	BAR	SWE	FRA	LAT	LAT	BEL	PRT	GER; 8	GER; 10					16th	20
