= 2021 FIA World Rallycross Championship =

Auto racing championship

The 2021 FIA World Rallycross Championship was the eighth season of the FIA World Rallycross Championship, an auto racing championship recognised by the Fédération Internationale de l'Automobile (FIA) as the highest class of international rallycross.

The championship was due to begin on 12 June at the Lånkebanen in Norway and end on 10 October at the Circuit de Spa-Francorchamps in Belgium; however after calendar adjustments, it began on 23 July at the Circuit de Barcelona-Catalunya in Spain and ended on 28 November at the Nürburgring in Germany.

2021 was the first season with the WRC Promoter GmbH as the championship promoter after succeeding IMG, subsequently formed Rallycross Promoter GmbH. Johan Kristoffersson won the Drivers' Championship for the second consecutive year, with the title also being his fourth overall. Hansen World RX Team won the Teams' Championship.

== Calendar ==
The 2021 championship was due to be contested over 10 rounds in Europe, the Middle East, and Sub-Saharan Africa.
The initial calendar was released on 16 December 2020, it included two unconfirmed slots: 1 for a round in Europe, and one for a round in the Middle East/Asia. On 26 March 2021, the calendar was adjusted due to the effects of COVID-19 pandemic; and the rounds in Finland, Middle East, and South Africa were removed from the calendar. On 12 May 2021; the calendar was adjusted again by cancelling World RX of Norway, postponing World RX of Sweden, and World RX of Portugal returned to the calendar as the final round.

Rnd	Event	Date	Venue	Class	Winner	Team	Report
1	(Spain) World RX of Barcelona-Catalunya	23–24 July	Circuit de Barcelona-Catalunya, Montmeló	RX1	(Sweden) Kevin Hansen	(Sweden) Hansen World RX Team	Report
1	(Spain) World RX of Barcelona-Catalunya	23–24 July	Circuit de Barcelona-Catalunya, Montmeló	RX2e	(Belgium) Guillaume De Ridder	(Belgium) Guillaume De Ridder	Report
2	World RX of Sweden	20–22 August (Note: World RX of Sweden was originally due to take place on 2–4 July 2021; however it was rescheduled to 20–22 August 2021 in response to the COVID-19 pandemic)	Höljesbanan, Höljes	RX1	(Sweden) Timmy Hansen	(Sweden) Hansen World RX Team	Report
2	World RX of Sweden	20–22 August	Höljesbanan, Höljes	RX2e	(Finland) Jesse Kallio	(Sweden) Olsbergs MSE	Report
3	(France) Bretagne World RX of Lohéac	3–5 September	Circuit de Lohéac, Lohéac	RX1	(Sweden) Timmy Hansen	(Sweden) Hansen World RX Team	Report
3	(France) Bretagne World RX of Lohéac	3–5 September	Circuit de Lohéac, Lohéac	RX2e	(France) Dorian Deslandes	(Sweden) Olsbergs MSE	Report
4	(Latvia) Ferratum World RX of Riga	18–19 September	Biķernieku Kompleksā Sporta Bāze, Riga	RX1	(Finland) Niclas Grönholm	(Finland) GRX-SET World RX Team	Report
5	(Latvia) Ferratum World RX of Riga	18–19 September	Biķernieku Kompleksā Sporta Bāze, Riga	RX1	(Sweden) Johan Kristoffersson	(Sweden) KYB EKS JC	Report
6	(Belgium) Benelux World RX of Spa-Francorchamps	9–10 October	Circuit de Spa-Francorchamps, Stavelot	RX1	(Sweden) Johan Kristoffersson	(Sweden) KYB EKS JC	Report
6	(Belgium) Benelux World RX of Spa-Francorchamps	9–10 October	Circuit de Spa-Francorchamps, Stavelot	RX2e	(Belgium) Guillaume De Ridder	(Belgium) Guillaume De Ridder	Report
7	(Portugal) Cooper Tires World RX of Montalegre	16–17 October	Pista Automóvel de Montalegre, Montalegre	RX1	(Finland) Niclas Grönholm	(Finland) GRX-SET World RX Team	Report
8	World RX of Germany	27–28 November	Nürburgring, Nürburg	RX1	(Sweden) Johan Kristoffersson	(Sweden) KYB EKS JC	Report
9	World RX of Germany	27–28 November	Nürburgring, Nürburg	RX1	(Finland) Niclas Grönholm	(Finland) GRX-SET World RX Team	Report
9	World RX of Germany	27–28 November	Nürburgring, Nürburg	RX2e	(Belgium) Guillaume De Ridder	(Belgium) Guillaume De Ridder	Report
Cancelled Races
C	World RX of Norway	12–13 June	Lånkebanen, Hell	RX1	Cancelled		
C	World RX of Norway	12–13 June	Lånkebanen, Hell	RX2e	Cancelled		

=== Calendar Changes ===
- After being cancelled due to the COVID-19 pandemic, the World RX of Benelux, World RX of Germany, World RX of France and all returned to the calendar.
- After being on the 2020 calendar, then cancelled due to the COVID-19 pandemic, the World RX of Russia, World RX of Finland and World RX of Abu Dhabi were not included on the initial calendar.
- The World RX of South Africa firstly returned to the initial calendar, however it was removed from the calendar after the adjustment of the calendar.
- The World RX of Riga - Latvia was firstly not included in the initial calendar, it returned to the calendar after the adjustment. However, it is still subject to the contract. On the 19th of July, it was announced that the event had been expanded to a double-header weekend, bringing the total number of championship rounds to 9.
- The World RX of Norway firstly returned to the initial calendar, however it was removed from the calendar in response to the COVID-19 pandemic.
- The World RX of Portugal was firstly not included in the initial calendars, it returned to the calendar after the cancellation of World RX of Norway.
- The World RX of Germany was originally scheduled to hold a double header for rounds 2 and 3 of the season, but was later postponed due to the circuit aiding in the disaster relief efforts following the 2021 European floods.

== Series News ==
- The FIA announced a tender process to find a new promoter to replace IMG. IMG had been the championship's promoters since its inception in 2014.
- On 11 February 2021, it was announced that WRC Promoter GmbH would replace IMG as the championship's promoter, subsequently formed Rallycross Promoter GmbH on 21 April 2021.
- The Supercar class was renamed RX1.
- The RX2 class was discontinued. It was replaced by the electric RX2e class.

== Entries ==
=== RX1 ===
Constructor	Team	Car	No.	Drivers	Rounds	Ref
Audi	(Sweden) KYB EKS JC	Audi S1	1	(Sweden) Johan Kristoffersson	All	
Audi	(Sweden) KYB EKS JC	Audi S1	91	(Belgium) Enzo Ide	All	
Audi	(Hungary) Kárai Motorsport Sportegyesület	Audi S1	73	(Hungary) Tamás Kárai	1, 8-9	
Audi	(Hungary) Volland Racing KFT	Audi S1	95	(Switzerland) Yury Belevskiy	8-9	
Citroën	(France) Hervé Knapick	Citroën DS3	84	(France) Hervé Knapick	3, 6, 8-9 (Note: Hervé Knapick was entered into round 9, but was later withdrawn as a result of crash damage sustained in round 8.)	
Ford	(Republic of Ireland) Ollie O'Donovan	Ford Fiesta	2	(Republic of Ireland) Ollie O'Donovan	3, 6-9	
Ford	(Finland) Juha Rytkönen	Ford Fiesta	18	(Finland) Juha Rytkönen	1-2, 4-6	
Ford	(Sweden) Team SKÅAB	Ford Fiesta	31	(Sweden) Stefan Kristensson	8-9	
Ford	(Hungary) Nyirád Motorsport KFT	Ford Fiesta	50	(Hungary) Attila Mozer	1-2	
Hyundai	(Sweden) Hedströms Motorsport	Hyundai i20	8	(Sweden) Peter Hedström	2	
Hyundai	(Sweden) Hedströms Motorsport	Hyundai i20	92	(Sweden) Anton Marklund	6, 8-9	
Hyundai	(Finland) GRX-SET World RX Team	Hyundai i20	23	(Hungary) Krisztián Szabó	All	
Hyundai	(Finland) GRX-SET World RX Team	Hyundai i20	68	(Finland) Niclas Grönholm	All	
Hyundai	(France) Davy Jeanney	Hyundai i20	27	(France) Davy Jeanney	8-9	
Hyundai	(France) Patrick Guillerme	Hyundai i20	83	(France) Patrick Guillerme	1	
Mini	(United Kingdom) Oliver Bennett	Mini Cooper	42	(United Kingdom) Oliver Bennett	1	
Peugeot	(Sweden) Hansen World RX Team	Peugeot 208	9	(Sweden) Kevin Hansen	All	
Peugeot	(Sweden) Hansen World RX Team	Peugeot 208	21	(Sweden) Timmy Hansen	All	
Renault	(France) Unkorrupted	Renault Mégane R.S.	36	(France) Guerlain Chicherit	8-9	
Renault	(France) Unkorrupted	Renault Mégane R.S.	69	(Netherlands) Kevin Abbring	1-6	
SEAT	(Germany) ALL-INKL.COM Münnich Motorsport	SEAT Ibiza	5	(Sweden) Mattias Ekström	4-5	
SEAT	(Germany) ALL-INKL.COM Münnich Motorsport	SEAT Ibiza	38	(Germany) Mandie August	1	
SEAT	(Germany) ALL-INKL.COM Münnich Motorsport	SEAT Ibiza	44	(Germany) Timo Scheider	1, 3-6	
SEAT	(Germany) ALL-INKL.COM Münnich Motorsport	SEAT Ibiza	77	(Germany) René Münnich	1	
Volkswagen	(Sweden) Hedströms Motorsport	Volkswagen Polo	17	(Sweden) Dan Öberg	1, 4-5	

=== RX2e ===
Constructor	Team	Car	No.	Drivers	Rounds	Ref
QEV Technologies	(Belgium) Ann Luijten	ZEROID X1	2	(Belgium) Kobe Pauwels	5	
QEV Technologies	(Spain) Ruben Fernandez Gil	ZEROID X1	5	(Spain) Pablo Suárez	1	
QEV Technologies	(Spain) Monlau Competición	ZEROID X1	5	(Spain) Pablo Suárez	2-5	
QEV Technologies	(Sweden) Olsbergs MSE	ZEROID X1	11	(France) Dorian Deslandes	3	
QEV Technologies	(Sweden) Olsbergs MSE	ZEROID X1	12	(Sweden) Klara Andersson	4-5	
QEV Technologies	(Sweden) Olsbergs MSE	ZEROID X1	28	(Sweden) Filip Thorén	4-5	
QEV Technologies	(Sweden) Olsbergs MSE	ZEROID X1	35	(Sweden) Fraser McConnell (Note: Fraser McConnell is a Jamaican driver competing under a Swedish license.)	1-2	
QEV Technologies	(Sweden) Olsbergs MSE	ZEROID X1	47	(Finland) Jesse Kallio	All	
QEV Technologies	(Sweden) Olsbergs MSE	ZEROID X1	82	(Sweden) Isak Sjökvist	2-5	
QEV Technologies	(Sweden) Olsbergs MSE	ZEROID X1	121	(United States) Conner Martell	3-4	
QEV Technologies	(Republic of Ireland) Patrick O'Donovan	ZEROID X1	13	(Republic of Ireland) Patrick O'Donovan	All	
QEV Technologies	(Sweden) Kristoffersson Motorsport	ZEROID X1	14	(Sweden) Nils Andersson	2-3	
QEV Technologies	(Latvia) RN Kaspersky Racing Team	ZEROID X1	15	(Latvia) Reinis Nitišs	3	
QEV Technologies	(Sweden) Linus Östlund	ZEROID X1	18	(Sweden) Linus Östlund	2	
QEV Technologies	(France) Damien Meunier	ZEROID X1	21	(France) Damien Meunier	1-2	
QEV Technologies	(United Kingdom) XITE Energy Racing	ZEROID X1	22	(Italy) Christine Giampaoli Zonca	4	
QEV Technologies	(Italy) Jan Oscar Ortfeldt	ZEROID X1	36	(Italy) Jan Oscar Ortfeldt (Note: Jan Oscar Ortfeldt is a Swedish driver competing under an Italian license.)	1	
QEV Technologies	(Spain) Acciona Sainz XE Team	ZEROID X1	44	(Spain) Laia Sanz	4	
QEV Technologies	(Switzerland) G4 Motors SA	ZEROID X1	55	(Spain) José-Luis García Molina	1	
QEV Technologies	(United Kingdom) Mark Flaherty	ZEROID X1	77	(United Kingdom) Mark Flaherty	1	
QEV Technologies	(Norway) Ole-Henry Steinsholt	ZEROID X1	88	(Norway) Ole-Henry Steinsholt	1	
QEV Technologies	(Belgium) Guillaume De Ridder	ZEROID X1	96	(Belgium) Guillaume De Ridder	All	
QEV Technologies	(Spain) Escuderia Mollerussa	ZEROID X1	112	(Spain) Pepe Arqué	5	
QEV Technologies	(France) Cyril Raymond	ZEROID X1	113	(France) Cyril Raymond	3	
QEV Technologies	(Sweden) EKS JC	ZEROID X1	170	(Sweden) Isak Reiersen	2	

== Championship Standings ==
World Championship points are scored as follows:

	Position															
Round	1st	2nd	3rd	4th	5th	6th	7th	8th	9th	10th	11th	12th	13th	14th	15th	16th
Heats	16	15	14	13	12	11	10	9	8	7	6	5	4	3	2	1
Semi-Finals	6	5	4	3	2	1										
Final	8	5	4	3	2	1										

=== RX1 Driver's Championship ===
Pos.	Driver	BAR (Spain)	SWE (Sweden)	FRA (France)	LAT (Latvia)		BEL (Belgium)	PRT (Portugal)	GER (Germany)		Points
1	(Sweden) Johan Kristoffersson	3	7	7	5	1	1	6	1	3	217
2	(Sweden) Timmy Hansen	2	1	1	2	3	4	2	5	4	217
3	(Finland) Niclas Grönholm	8	8	3	1	2	8	1	4	1	197
4	(Sweden) Kevin Hansen	1	2	2	3	5	2	3	9	2	191
5	(Hungary) Krisztián Szabó	4	5	5	4	6	3	4	3	7	162
6	(Belgium) Enzo Ide	10	4	8	9	9	5	5	6	6	125
7	(Netherlands) Kevin Abbring	6	3	4	8	8	7				97
8	(Germany) Timo Scheider	7		6	6	7	9				75
9	(Finland) Juha Rytkönen	9	6		10	10	10				52
10	(Sweden) Mattias Ekström				7	4					37
11	(Republic of Ireland) Ollie O'Donovan			9			12	7	13	13	37
12	(Switzerland) Yury Belevskiy								2	9	36
13	(Sweden) Anton Marklund						6		12	8	33
14	(France) Guerlain Chicherit								7	5	27
15	(Hungary) Tamás Kárai	11							10	11	25
16	(France) Davy Jeanney								8	10	20
17	(France) Hervé Knapick			10			11		NC	WD	18
18	(Germany) René Münnich	5									16
19	(Sweden) Stefan Kristensson								11	12	14
20	(Hungary) Attila Mózer	14	10								13
21	(Sweden) Peter Hedström		9								11
22	(United Kingdom) Oliver Bennett	12									8
23	(Sweden) Dan Öberg	16			11 (Note: Dan Öberg was deducted 10 championship points for the use of a fourth turbo over the season.)	11					7
24	(Germany) Mandie August	13									4
25	(France) Patrick Guillerme	15									2
Pos.	Driver	BAR (Spain)	SWE (Sweden)	FRA (France)	LAT (Latvia)		BEL (Belgium)	PRT (Portugal)	GER (Germany)		Points

Colour	Result
Gold	Winner
Silver	Second place
Bronze	Third place
Green	Points classification
Blue	Non-points classification
Blue	Non-classified finish (NC)
Purple	Retired, not classified (Ret)
Red	Did not qualify (DNQ)
Red	Did not pre-qualify (DNPQ)
Black	Disqualified (DSQ)
White	Did not start (DNS)
White	Withdrew (WD)
White	Race cancelled (C)
Blank	Did not practice (DNP)
Blank	Did not arrive (DNA)
Blank	Excluded (EX)

=== RX1 Team's Championship ===
Pos.	Team	No.	BAR (Spain)	SWE (Sweden)	FRA (France)	LAT (Latvia)		BEL (Belgium)	PRT (Portugal)	GER (Germany)		Points
1	(Sweden) Hansen World RX Team	9	1	2	2	3	5	2	3	9	2	408
1	(Sweden) Hansen World RX Team	21	2	1	1	2	3	4	2	5	4	408
2	(Finland) GRX-SET World RX Team	23	4	5	5	4	6	3	4	3	7	359
2	(Finland) GRX-SET World RX Team	68	8	8	3	1	2	8	1	4	1	359
3	(Sweden) KYB EKS JC	1	3	7	7	5	1	1	6	1	3	342
3	(Sweden) KYB EKS JC	91	10	4	8	9	9	5	5	6	6	342
Pos.	Driver		BAR (Spain)	SWE (Sweden)	FRA (France)	LAT (Latvia)		BEL (Belgium)	PRT (Portugal)	GER (Germany)		Points

=== RX2e Driver's Championship ===
Pos.	Driver	BAR (Spain)	SWE (Sweden)	FRA (France)	BEL (Belgium)	GER (Germany)	Points
1	(Belgium) Guillaume De Ridder	1	4	3	1	1	134
2	(Finland) Jesse Kallio	5	1	4	2	2	123
3	(Spain) Pablo Suárez	4	10	10	5	3	76
4	(Republic of Ireland) Patrick O'Donovan	3	6	9	7	7	76
5	(Sweden) Isak Sjökvist		3	6	3	5	72
6	(Sweden) Fraser McConnell	6	2				49
7	(Sweden) Klara Andersson				4	8	35
8	(France) Dorian Deslandes			1			30
9	(Sweden) Nils Andersson		7	8			29
10	(United States) Conner Martell			5	9		26
11	(Latvia) Reinis Nitišs			2			24
12	(Sweden) Filip Thorén				6	9	23
13	(France) Damien Meunier	8	9				23
14	(Norway) Ole Henry Steinsholt	2					21
15	(Belgium) Kobe Pauwels					4	21
16	(Sweden) Linus Östlund		5				19
17	(Spain) Pepe Arqué					6	18
18	(France) Cyril Raymond			7			16
19	(Spain) Jose-Luis Garcia Molina	7					13
20	(Italy) Christine Giampaoli Zonca				8		13
21	(Sweden) Isak Reiersen		8				13
22	(United Kingdom) Mark Flaherty	9					10
23	(Italy) Jan Oscar Ortfeldt	10					9
24	(Spain) Laia Sanz				10		9
Pos.	Driver	BAR (Spain)	SWE (Sweden)	FRA (France)	BEL (Belgium)	GER (Germany)	Points
