= Hervé Lemonnier =

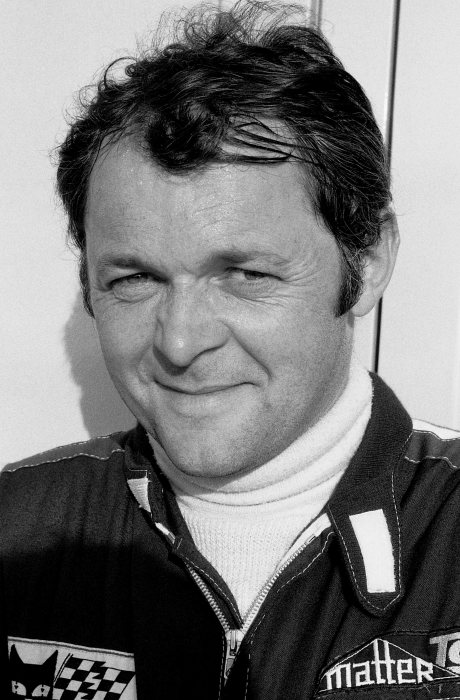
- Lemonnier in 1979
- Nationality: French
- Born: Hervé Fernánd René Lemonnier; 9 January 1947 (age 79) Lisieux, France

FIA World Rallycross Championship career
- Debut season: 2014
- Current team: Hervé "Knapick" Lemonnier
- Car number: 84
- Starts: 18
- Wins: 0
- Podiums: 0
- Best finish: 17th in 2021

Hervé Fernánd René Lemonnier (born 9 January 1947 at Lisieux), in motorsport better known under his pseudonym "Knapick", is a French rallycross, rally and ice racing driver of the Andros Trophy series.

== Biography ==
Lemonnier started his car racing career as a competitor in the 1966 Rallye Côte Fleurie. From 1969 on, he began to hide his family name by entering competitions under the alias "Knapick". Being at the time a farm machinery dealer, he chose the brand of Knapick trailers for his pseudonym, to hide from his customers that he was one of these "crazy car racers" in his spare time. The businessman from Normandy later moved to Brittany to found a DAF Trucks dealership in Noyal-sur-Vilaine near the town of Rennes.

== Results ==
=== Complete FIA World Rallycross Championship results ===
==== Supercar/RX1 ====
Year	Entrant	Car	1	2	3	4	5	6	7	8	9	10	11	12	13	WRX	Points
2014	Hervé "Knapick" Lemonnier	Citroën DS3	PRT	GBR	NOR	FIN	SWE	BEL	CAN	FRA; 23	GER	ITA	TUR	ARG		N/C	0
2015	Hervé "Knapick" Lemonnier	Citroën DS3	POR	HOC	BEL	GBR	GER	SWE	CAN	NOR	FRA; 22	BAR; 20	TUR	ITA	ARG	N/C	0
2016	Hervé "Knapick" Lemonnier	Citroën DS3	POR	HOC	BEL	GBR	NOR	SWE	CAN	FRA; 20	BAR	LAT	GER	ARG		36th	0
2017	Hervé "Knapick" Lemonnier	Citroën DS3	BAR; 18	POR	HOC	BEL	GBR	NOR; 21	SWE; 21	CAN	FRA	LAT; 16	GER	RSA		25th	1
2018	Hervé "Knapick" Lemonnier	Citroën DS3	BAR; 17	POR	BEL	GBR; 22	NOR	SWE	CAN	FRA; 23	LAT	USA	GER	RSA		27th	0
2019	Hervé "Knapick" Lemonnier	Citroën DS3	ABU	BAR; 19	BEL; 20	GBR; 17	NOR	SWE	CAN	FRA; 21^{a}	LAV	RSA				39th	-15
2021	Hervé "Knapick" Lemonnier	Citroën DS3	BAR	SWE	FRA; 10	LAT	LAT	BEL; 11	PRT	GER; 14	GER; WD					17th	18

^{a} Loss of 15 championship points – stewards' decision

=== Complete Andros Trophy results ===
==== Elite class ====
Year	Entrant	Car	1	2	3	4	5	6	7	8	9	10	11	12	13	Position	Points
2015–16	DA Racing	Renault Clio	VTH1	VTH2	PCA1; 2	PCA2; 3	HUE1	HUE2	ISO1; 4	ISO2; 8	LVE1	LVE2	SBE	STV1	STV2	14th	199
