= Ollie O'Donovan =

Irish rallycross driver (b.1966)

Oliver O'Donovan
- Nationality: Irish
- Born: Oliver Allan O'Donovan; 15 September 1966 (age 60) Limerick, Ireland

FIA ERX Supercar Championship career
- Debut season: 2015
- Current team: Oliver O'Donovan
- Car number: 2
- Starts: 14
- Wins: 0
- Podiums: 1
- Best finish: 8th in 2015
- Finished last season: 12th

FIA World Rallycross Championship career
- Debut season: 2014
- Starts: 11
- Wins: 0
- Podiums: 0
- Best finish: 11th in 2021

Oliver Allan O'Donovan is an Irish rallycross driver. He was the 2007 British Rallycross Champion, and currently competes in the FIA European Rallycross Championship as a privateer.

== Results ==
=== Complete FIA World Rallycross Championship results ===
Supercar/RX1

Year	Entrant	Car	1	2	3	4	5	6	7	8	9	10	11	12	13	WRX	Points
2014	Oliver O'Donovan	Ford Focus	POR	GBR; 37	NOR	FIN	SWE	BEL	CAN	FRA	GER	ITA	TUR	ARG; 11		37th	8
2015	Oliver O'Donovan	Ford Fiesta	POR	HOC	BEL	GBR; 22	GER	SWE	CAN	NOR	FRA	BAR	TUR	ITA	ARG	40th	0
2016	Oliver O'Donovan	Ford Fiesta	POR	HOC	BEL	GBR	NOR	SWE	CAN	FRA; 27	BAR	LAT	GER	ARG		45th	0
2017	Oliver O'Donovan	Ford Fiesta	BAR	POR	HOC	BEL	GBR; 20	NOR	SWE	CAN	FRA	LAT	GER	RSA		34th	0
2018	Oliver O'Donovan	Ford Fiesta	BAR	POR	BEL	GBR	NOR	SWE	CAN	FRA; 22	LAT	USA	GER	RSA		35th	0
2021	Oliver O'Donovan	Ford Fiesta	BAR	SWE	FRA; 9	LAT	LAT	BEL; 12	PRT; 7	GER; 13	GER; 13					11th	37

=== Complete FIA European Rallycross Championship results ===
==== Supercar ====
Year	Entrant	Car	1	2	3	4	5	ERX	Points
2015	Oliver O'Donovan	Ford Fiesta	BEL; 13	GER; 9	NOR; 5	BAR; 4	ITA; 15	8th	41
2016	Oliver O'Donovan	Ford Fiesta	BEL	NOR; 12	SWE; 17	BAR; 11	LAT; 12	15th	21
2017	Oliver O'Donovan	Ford Fiesta	BAR; 3	NOR; 13	SWE; 16	FRA; 12	LAT; 13	12th	33
