= 2021 World RX of Latvia =

Season of motor racing

- Round 4 of 9 in the 2021 FIA World Rallycross Championship
- Date: 18 September 2021
- Location: Riga, Latvia
- Venue: Biķernieku Kompleksā Sporta Bāze

Results
Heat winners
- Heat 1: (Sweden) Johan Kristoffersson; KYB EKS JC
- Heat 2: (Sweden) Mattias Ekström; ALL-INKL.COM Münnich Motorsport
- Heat 3: (Finland) Niclas Grönholm; GRX-SET World RX Team
Semi-final winners
- Semi-final 1: (Sweden) Johan Kristoffersson; KYB EKS JC
- Semi-final 2: (Finland) Niclas Grönholm; GRX-SET World RX Team
Final
- First: (Finland) Niclas Grönholm; GRX-SET World RX Team
- Second: (Sweden) Timmy Hansen; Hansen World RX Team
- Third: (Sweden) Kevin Hansen; Hansen World RX Team

World RX layout of Biķernieku Kompleksā Sporta Bāze

2021 World RX of Latvia
- Round 5 of 9 in the 2020 FIA World Rallycross Championship
- Date: 19 September 2020
- Location: Riga, Latvia
- Venue: Biķernieku Kompleksā Sporta Bāze

Results
Heat winners
- Heat 1: (Sweden) Mattias Ekström; ALL-INKL.COM Münnich Motorsport
- Heat 2: (Finland) Niclas Grönholm; GRX-SET World RX Team
- Heat 3: (Finland) Niclas Grönholm; GRX-SET World RX Team
Semi-final winners
- Semi-final 1: (Finland) Niclas Grönholm; GRX-SET World RX Team
- Semi-final 2: (Sweden) Johan Kristoffersson; KYB EKS JC
Final
- First: (Sweden) Johan Kristoffersson; KYB EKS JC
- Second: (Finland) Niclas Grönholm; GRX-SET World RX Team
- Third: (Sweden) Timmy Hansen; Hansen World RX Team

The 2021 Ferratum World RX of Riga was the fourth and fifth round of the eighth season of the FIA World Rallycross Championship. The event was first of two double-headers (two races in a weekend) of the season and held at Biķernieku Kompleksā Sporta Bāze, in the Latvian capital of Riga.

== World RX1 Championship Race 1 ==
=== Heats ===
Pos.	No.	Driver	Team	Car	Q1	Q2	Q3	Pts
1	1	(Sweden) Johan Kristoffersson	KYB EKS JC	Audi S1	1st	2nd	2nd	16
2	68	(Finland) Niclas Grönholm	GRX-SET World RX Team	Hyundai i20	3rd	5th	1st	15
3	5	(Sweden) Mattias Ekström	ALL-INKL.COM Münnich Motorsport	SEAT Ibiza	5th	1st	3rd	14
4	9	(Sweden) Kevin Hansen	Hansen World RX Team	Peugeot 208	2nd	4th	6th	13
5	21	(Sweden) Timmy Hansen	Hansen World RX Team	Peugeot 208	4th	3rd	4th	12
6	44	(Germany) Timo Scheider	ALL-INKL.COM Münnich Motorsport	SEAT Ibiza	6th	9th	7th	11
7	23	(Hungary) Kristian Szabo	GRX-SET World RX Team	Hyundai i20	7th	8th	8th	10
8	69	(Netherlands) Kevin Abbring	Unkorrupted	Renault Mégane RS	8th	11th	5th	9
9	91	(Belgium) Enzo Ide	KYB EKS JC	Audi S1	10th	6th	9th	8
10	18	(Finland) Juha Rytkönen	Juha Rytkönen	Ford Fiesta MK8	9th	7th	11th	7
11	17	(Sweden) Dan Öberg	Hedströms Motorsport	Volkswagen Polo	11th	10th	10th	6

=== Semi-finals ===
Semi-Final 1

Pos.	No.	Driver	Team	Time	Pts
1	1	(Sweden) Johan Kristoffersson	KYB EKS JC	5:00.535	6
2	21	(Sweden) Timmy Hansen	Hansen World RX Team	+ 0.879	5
3	23	(Hungary) Krisztián Szabó	GRX-SET World RX Team	+ 4.646	4
4	17	(Sweden) Dan Öberg	Hedströms Motorsport	+ 38.445	3
5	5	(Sweden) Mattias Ekström	ALL-INKL.COM Münnich Motorsport	DNF	2
6	91	(Belgium) Enzo Ide	KYB EKS JC	DNF	3

Semi-Final 2

Pos.	No.	Driver	Team	Time	Pts
1	68	(Finland) Niclas Grönholm	GRX-SET World RX Team	4:59.330	6
2	44	(Germany) Timo Scheider	ALL-INKL.COM Münnich Motorsport	+ 1.490	5
3	9	(Sweden) Kevin Hansen	Hansen World RX Team	+ 6.184	4
4	69	(Netherlands) Kevin Abbring	Unkorrupted	+ 7.049	3
5	18	(Finland) Juha Rytkönen	Juha Rytkönen	+ 12.608	2

=== Final ===
Pos.	No.	Driver	Team	Time	Pts
1	68	(Finland) Niclas Grönholm	GRX-SET World RX Team	4:59.350	8
2	21	(Sweden) Timmy Hansen	Hansen World RX Team	+ 4.641	5
3	9	(Sweden) Kevin Hansen	Hansen World RX Team	+ 6.034	4
4	23	(Hungary) Krisztián Szabó	GRX-SET World RX Team	+ 7.209	3
5	1	(Sweden) Johan Kristoffersson	KYB EKS JC	+ 1:21.714*	2
6	44	(Germany) Timo Scheider	ALL-INKL.COM Münnich Motorsport	DNF	1

- Note: Johan Kristoffersson loose one lap after side-to-side contact with Niclas Grönholm in the run to the first corner.

== World RX1 Championship Race 2 ==
=== Heats ===
Pos.	No.	Driver	Team	Car	Q1	Q2	Q3	Pts
1	68	(Finland) Niclas Grönholm	GRX-SET World RX Team	Hyundai i20	6th	1st	1st	16
2	1	(Sweden) Johan Kristoffersson	KYB EKS JC	Audi S1	2nd	2nd	4th	15
3	21	(Sweden) Timmy Hansen	Hansen World RX Team	Peugeot 208	4th	4th	2nd	14
4	5	(Sweden) Mattias Ekström	ALL-INKL.COM Münnich Motorsport	SEAT Ibiza	1st	3rd	10th	13
5	44	(Germany) Timo Scheider	ALL-INKL.COM Münnich Motorsport	SEAT Ibiza	3rd	6th	3rd	12
6	9	(Sweden) Kevin Hansen	Hansen World RX Team	Peugeot 208	9th	5th	5th	11
7	69	(Netherlands) Kevin Abbring	Unkorrupted	Renault Mégane RS	5th	8th	9th	10
8	23	(Hungary) Kristian Szabo	GRX-SET World RX Team	Hyundai i20	11th	6th	6th	9
9	91	(Belgium) Enzo Ide	KYB EKS JC	Audi S1	8th	9th	7th	8
10	18	(Finland) Juha Rytkönen	Juha Rytkönen	Ford Fiesta MK8	7th	10th	8th	7
11	17	(Sweden) Dan Öberg	Hedströms Motorsport	Volkswagen Polo	10th	11th	DNS	6

=== Semi-finals ===
Semi-Final 1

Pos.	No.	Driver	Team	Time	Pts
1	68	(Finland) Niclas Grönholm	GRX-SET World RX Team	4:59.844	6
2	21	(Sweden) Timmy Hansen	Hansen World RX Team	+ 1.428	5
3*	44	(Germany) Timo Scheider	ALL-INKL.COM Münnich Motorsport	+ 1.756	4
4	91	(Belgium) Enzo Ide	KYB EKS JC	+ 6.338	3
5	69	(Netherlands) Kevin Abbring	Unkorrupted	+ 6.353	2
6	17	(Sweden) Dan Öberg	Hedströms Motorsport	+ 21.143	3

Semi-Final 2

Pos.	No.	Driver	Team	Time	Pts
1	1	(Sweden) Johan Kristoffersson	KYB EKS JC	4:59.282	6
2	5	(Sweden) Mattias Ekström	ALL-INKL.COM Münnich Motorsport	+ 0.474	5
3	9	(Sweden) Kevin Hansen	Hansen World RX Team	+ 4.157	4
4*	23	(Hungary) Krisztián Szabó	GRX-SET World RX Team	+ 6.844	3
5	18	(Finland) Juha Rytkönen	Juha Rytkönen	+ 7.510	2

- Note: Timo Scheider’s Munnich Motorsport Seat Ibiza’s propshaft failed during his pre-launch on the way to the Final grid, so first reserve driver Krisztián Szabó took his place.

=== Final ===
Pos.	No.	Driver	Team	Time	Pts
1	1	(Sweden) Johan Kristoffersson	KYB EKS JC	4:59.316	8
2	68	(Finland) Niclas Grönholm	GRX-SET World RX Team	+ 0.920	5
3	21	(Sweden) Timmy Hansen	Hansen World RX Team	+ 2.149	4
4	5	(Sweden) Mattias Ekström	ALL-INKL.COM Münnich Motorsport	+ 2.274	3
5	9	(Sweden) Kevin Hansen	Hansen World RX Team	+ 5.525	2
6	23	(Hungary) Krisztián Szabó	GRX-SET World RX Team	+ 8.161	1

== Standings after the event ==
Pos.	Driver	Pts	Gap
1	(Sweden) Timmy Hansen	130	
2	(Sweden) Kevin Hansen	113	+17
3	(Sweden) Johan Kristoffersson	110	+20
4	(Finland) Niclas Grönholm	107	+23
5	(Hungary) Krisztián Szabó	88	+42
6	(Netherlands) Kevin Abbring	79	+51

- Note: Only the top six positions are included.

Previous race: 2021 World RX of France	FIA World Rallycross Championship; 2021 season	Next race: 2021 World RX of Benelux
Previous race: 2020 World RX of Latvia	World RX of Latvia	Next race: 2022 World RX of Riga-Latvia
