= 2021 World RX of Germany =

Rallycross championship

- Round 8 of 9 in the 2021 FIA World Rallycross Championship
- Date: 27 November 2021
- Location: Nürburg, Germany
- Venue: Nürburgring

Results
Heat winners
- Heat 1: (Sweden) Johan Kristoffersson; KYB EKS JC
- Heat 2: (Finland) Niclas Grönholm; GRX-SET World RX Team
- Heat 3: none none
Semi-final winners
- Semi-final 1: (Sweden) Johan Kristoffersson; KYB EKS JC
- Semi-final 2: (Switzerland) Yury Belevskiy; Volland Racing KFT
Final
- First: (Sweden) Johan Kristoffersson; KYB EKS JC
- Second: (Switzerland) Yury Belevskiy; Volland Racing KFT
- Third: (Hungary) Krisztián Szabó; GRX-SET World RX Team

World RX layout of Nürburgring

2021 World RX of Germany
- Round 9 of 9 in the 2021 FIA World Rallycross Championship
- Date: 28 November 2021
- Location: Nürburg, Germany
- Venue: Nürburgring

Results
Heat winners
- Heat 1: (Sweden) Johan Kristoffersson; KYB EKS JC
- Heat 2: (Belgium) Enzo Ide; KYB EKS JC
- Heat 3: (Sweden) Johan Kristoffersson; KYB EKS JC
Semi-final winners
- Semi-final 1: (Sweden) Johan Kristoffersson; KYB EKS JC
- Semi-final 2: (Sweden) Kevin Hansen; Hansen World RX Team
Final
- First: (Finland) Niclas Grönholm; GRX-SET World RX Team
- Second: (Sweden) Kevin Hansen; Hansen World RX Team
- Third: (Sweden) Johan Kristoffersson; KYB EKS JC

The 2021 World RX of Germany was the eighth and ninth and final round of the eighth season of the FIA World Rallycross Championship. The event was second of two double-headers (two races in a weekend) of the season and held at the Nürburgring, Nürburg.

== World RX1 Championship Race 1 ==
=== Heats ===
Pos.	No.	Driver	Team	Car	Q1	Q2	Q3	Pts
1	1	(Sweden) Johan Kristoffersson	KYB EKS JC	Audi S1	1st	3rd	C*	16
2	95	(Switzerland) Yury Belevskiy	Volland Racing KFT	Audi S1	2nd	2nd	C*	15
3	68	(Finland) Niclas Grönholm	GRX-SET World RX Team	Hyundai i20	6th	1st	C*	14
4	21	(Sweden) Timmy Hansen	Hansen World RX Team	Peugeot 208	3rd	5th	C*	13
5	23	(Hungary) Kristian Szabo	GRX-SET World RX Team	Hyundai i20	8th	4th	C*	12
6	27	(France) Davy Jeanney	Davy Jeanney	Hyundai i20	7th	7th	C*	11
7	36	(France) Guerlain Chicherit	Unkorrupted	Renault Mégane RS	5th	9th	C*	10
8	91	(Belgium) Enzo Ide	KYB EKS JC	Audi S1	4th	10th	C*	9
9	9	(Sweden) Kevin Hansen	Hansen World RX Team	Peugeot 208	9th	6th	C*	8
10	73	(Hungary) Tamás Kárai	Kárai Motorsport Sportegyesület	Audi S1	10th	8th	C*	7
11	31	(Sweden) Stefan Kristensson	Team SKÅAB	Ford Fiesta MK8	12th	11th	C*	6
12	92	(Sweden) Anton Marklund	Hedströms Motorsport	Hyundai i20	4th	10th	C*	9
13	2	(Republic of Ireland) Ollie O'Donovan	Oliver O'Donovan	Ford Fiesta	13th	12th	C*	4
*	84	(France) Hervé "Knapick" Lemonnier	Hervé Knapick	Citroën DS3	DNS	DNS	C*	NC

- Note: Qualifying was shortened to just two rounds due to a combination of delays for track preparation in the icy and snowy conditions, and a stoppage after a hefty crash for ‘Knapick’ in Q1.

=== Semi-finals ===
Semi-Final 1

Pos.	No.	Driver	Team	Time	Pts
1	1	(Sweden) Johan Kristoffersson	KYB EKS JC	3:39.927	6
2	68	(Finland) Niclas Grönholm	GRX-SET World RX Team	+ 2.100	5
3	23	(Hungary) Krisztián Szabó	GRX-SET World RX Team	+ 6.654	4
4	36	(France) Guerlain Chicherit	Unkorrupted	+ 12.793	3
5	9	(Sweden) Kevin Hansen	Hansen World RX Team	+ 13.764	2
6	31	(Sweden) Stefan Kristensson	Team SKÅAB	+ 2 laps	1

Semi-Final 2

Pos.	No.	Driver	Team	Time	Pts
1	95	(Switzerland) Yury Belevskiy	Volland Racing KFT	3:42.148	6
2	91	(Belgium) Enzo Ide	KYB EKS JC	+ 6.038	5
3	21	(Sweden) Timmy Hansen	Hansen World RX Team	+ 6.203	4
4	27	(France) Davy Jeanney	Davy Jeanney	+ 9.559	3
5	92	(Sweden) Anton Marklund	Peter Hedström	+ 9.847	2
6	73	(Hungary) Tamás Kárai	Kárai Motorsport Sportegyesület	+ 17.530	1

=== Final ===
Pos.	No.	Driver	Team	Time	Pts
1	1	(Sweden) Johan Kristoffersson	KYB EKS JC	3:44.666	8
2	95	(Switzerland) Yury Belevskiy	Volland Racing KFT	+ 4.644	5
3	23	(Hungary) Krisztián Szabó	GRX-SET World RX Team	+ 5.077	4
4	68	(Finland) Niclas Grönholm	GRX-SET World RX Team	+ 5.751	3
*	21	(Sweden) Timmy Hansen	Hansen World RX Team	DSQ	
*	91	(Belgium) Enzo Ide	KYB EKS JC	DSQ	

- Note: Timmy Hansen (originally finished second) and Enzo Ide (did not finish) have been disqualified from the Final following their involvement in a lap one incident that took Niclas Grönholm out of victory contention.

== World RX1 Championship Race 2 ==
=== Heats ===
Pos.	No.	Driver	Team	Car	Q1	Q2	Q3	Pts
1	1	(Sweden) Johan Kristoffersson	KYB EKS JC	Audi S1	1st	3rd	1st	16
2	21	(Sweden) Timmy Hansen	Hansen World RX Team	Peugeot 208	2nd	2nd	3rd	15
3	91	(Belgium) Enzo Ide	KYB EKS JC	Audi S1	7th	1st	8th	14
4	68	(Finland) Niclas Grönholm	GRX-SET World RX Team	Hyundai i20	5th	6th	2nd	13
5	23	(Hungary) Kristian Szabo	GRX-SET World RX Team	Hyundai i20	3rd	5th	6th	12
6	9	(Sweden) Kevin Hansen	Hansen World RX Team	Peugeot 208	8th	4th	4th	11
7	95	(Switzerland) Yury Belevskiy	Volland Racing KFT	Audi S1	6th	9th	5th	10
8	92	(Sweden) Anton Marklund	Hedströms Motorsport	Hyundai i20	4th	10th	10th	9
9	36	(France) Guerlain Chicherit	Unkorrupted	Renault Mégane RS	10th	8th	7th	8
10	27	(France) Davy Jeanney	Davy Jeanney	Hyundai i20	9th	7th	9th	7
11	73	(Hungary) Tamás Kárai	Kárai Motorsport Sportegyesület	Audi S1	11th	12th	11th	6
12	31	(Sweden) Stefan Kristensson	Team SKÅAB	Ford Fiesta MK8	12th	11th	13th	5
13	2	(Republic of Ireland) Ollie O'Donovan	Oliver O'Donovan	Ford Fiesta	13th	13th	12th	4

=== Semi-finals ===
Semi-Final 1

Pos.	No.	Driver	Team	Time	Pts
1	1	(Sweden) Johan Kristoffersson	KYB EKS JC	3:40.482	6
2	91	(Belgium) Enzo Ide	KYB EKS JC	+ 1.542	5
3	36	(France) Guerlain Chicherit	Unkorrupted	+ 3.395	4
4	23	(Hungary) Krisztián Szabó	GRX-SET World RX Team	+ 5.805	3
5	73	(Hungary) Tamás Kárai	Kárai Motorsport Sportegyesület	+ 12.968	2
	95	(Switzerland) Yury Belevskiy	Volland Racing KFT	DSQ	

Semi-Final 2

Pos.	No.	Driver	Team	Time	Pts
1	9	(Sweden) Kevin Hansen	Hansen World RX Team	3:47.220	6
2	68	(Finland) Niclas Grönholm	GRX-SET World RX Team	+ 2.946	5
3	21	(Sweden) Timmy Hansen	Hansen World RX Team	+ 3.651	4
4	92	(Sweden) Anton Marklund	Peter Hedström	+ 4.170	3
5	31	(Sweden) Stefan Kristensson	Team SKÅAB	+ 15.952	2
6	27	(France) Davy Jeanney	Davy Jeanney	+ 3 laps	1

=== Final ===
Pos.	No.	Driver	Team	Time	Pts
1	68	(Finland) Niclas Grönholm	GRX-SET World RX Team	3:40.557	8
2	9	(Sweden) Kevin Hansen	Hansen World RX Team	+ 4.031	5
3	1	(Sweden) Johan Kristoffersson	KYB EKS JC	+ 4.259	4
4	21	(Sweden) Timmy Hansen	Hansen World RX Team	+ 5.480	3
5	36	(France) Guerlain Chicherit	Unkorrupted	+ 8.759	2
6	91	(Belgium) Enzo Ide	KYB EKS JC	+ 16.091	1

== Standings after the event ==
Pos.	Driver	Pts	Gap
WC	(Sweden) Johan Kristoffersson	217	
2	(Sweden) Timmy Hansen	217	
3	(Finland) Niclas Grönholm	197	+20
4	(Sweden) Kevin Hansen	191	+26
5	(Hungary) Krisztián Szabó	162	+55
6	(Belgium) Enzo Ide	125	+92

- Note: Only the top six positions are included.

Previous race: 2021 World RX of Montalegre	FIA World Rallycross Championship; 2021 season	Next race: 2022 World RX of Norway
Previous race: 2018 World RX of Germany	World RX of Germany	Next race: 2022 World RX of Germany
