= World RX of Germany =

Rallycross event held in Germany

The World RX of Germany was a Rallycross event held in Germany for the FIA World Rallycross Championship. The event made its debut in the 2014 season, at the Estering circuit in the town of Buxtehude, Lower Saxony, before being moved to the Nürburgring, Nürburg in 2020. The World RX of Germany is held annually in Germany and is one of the major events on the World RX calendar.

World RX layout of Nürburgring, used in 2021–2022

World RX layout of Estering, used in 2014–2018

== Past winners ==
| Year | Venue | Heat 1 winner | Heat 2 winner | Heat 3 winner | Heat 4 winner | Semi-Final 1 winner | Semi-Final 2 winner | Final winner |
|---|---|---|---|---|---|---|---|---|
| 2014 | Estering-Buxtehude | (Sweden) Robin Larsson | (Sweden) Mattias Ekström | (Norway) Andreas Bakkerud | (Sweden) Johan Kristoffersson | (Norway) Petter Solberg | (Sweden) Robin Larsson | (Norway) Petter Solberg |
| 2015 | Estering-Buxtehude | (France) Davy Jeanney | (France) Davy Jeanney | (France) Davy Jeanney | (Norway) Petter Solberg | (France) Davy Jeanney | (Norway) Petter Solberg | (France) Davy Jeanney |
| Year | Venue | Qualifying 1 winner | Qualifying 2 winner | Qualifying 3 winner | Qualifying 4 winner | Semi-Final 1 winner | Semi-Final 2 winner | Final winner |
| 2016 | Estering-Buxtehude | (Latvia) Jānis Baumanis | (Sweden) Mattias Ekström | (Norway) Petter Solberg | (Norway) Petter Solberg | (Norway) Petter Solberg | (Sweden) Mattias Ekström | (Sweden) Kevin Eriksson |
| 2017 | Estering-Buxtehude | (Sweden) Mattias Ekström | (Sweden) Timmy Hansen | (Norway) Petter Solberg | (Norway) Petter Solberg | (Norway) Petter Solberg | (Sweden) Mattias Ekström | (Sweden) Mattias Ekström |
| 2018 | Estering-Buxtehude | (Norway) Petter Solberg | (Sweden) Johan Kristoffersson | (Sweden) Mattias Ekström | (Sweden) Timmy Hansen | (Sweden) Johan Kristoffersson | (Sweden) Mattias Ekström | (Sweden) Johan Kristoffersson |
| 2020 | Nürburgring | Cancelled due to the COVID-19 pandemic | | | | | | |
| 2021 | Nürburgring | (Sweden) Johan Kristoffersson | (Finland) Niclas Grönholm | No Q3 (Weather conditions) | No Q4 (Double Header) | (Sweden) Johan Kristoffersson | (Switzerland) Yury Belevskiy | (Sweden) Johan Kristoffersson |
| 2021 | Nürburgring | (Sweden) Johan Kristoffersson | (Belgium) Enzo Ide | (Sweden) Johan Kristoffersson | No Q4 (Double Header) | (Sweden) Johan Kristoffersson | (Sweden) Kevin Hansen | (Finland) Niclas Grönholm |
| Year | Venue | Heat 1 winner | Heat 2 winner | Heat 3 winner | Progression best time | Semi-Final 1 winner | Semi-Final 2 winner | Final winner |
| 2022 | Nürburgring | (Sweden) Johan Kristoffersson | (Sweden) Kevin Hansen | (Sweden) Johan Kristoffersson | (Sweden) Timmy Hansen | (Sweden) Johan Kristoffersson | (Sweden) Timmy Hansen | (Sweden) Johan Kristoffersson |
