= 2021 World RX of Benelux =

Rallycross championship event

- Round 6 of 0 in the 2021 FIA World Rallycross Championship
- Date: 9-10 October 2021
- Location: Francorchamps, Liège Province
- Venue: Circuit de Spa-Francorchamps

Results
Heat winners
- Heat 1: (Netherlands) Kevin Abbring; Unkorrupted
- Heat 2: (Sweden) Johan Kristoffersson; KYB EKS JC
- Heat 3: (Finland) Niclas Grönholm; GRX-SET World RX Team
- Heat 4: (Netherlands) Kevin Abbring; Unkorrupted
Semi-final winners
- Semi-final 1: (Sweden) Kevin Hansen; Hansen World RX Team
- Semi-final 2: (Sweden) Johan Kristoffersson; KYB EKS JC
Final
- First: (Sweden) Johan Kristoffersson; KYB EKS JC
- Second: (Sweden) Kevin Hansen; Hansen World RX Team
- Third: (Hungary) Krisztián Szabó; GRX-SET World RX Team

World RX layout of Circuit de Spa-Francorchamps

The 2021 Benelux World RX of Spa-Francorchamps was the sixth round of the eighth season of the FIA World Rallycross Championship. The event was held at the Circuit de Spa-Francorchamps in Francorchamps, Belgium.

== World RX1 Championship ==
=== Heats ===
Pos.	No.	Driver	Team	Car	Q1	Q2	Q3	Q4	Pts
1	69	(Netherlands) Kevin Abbring	Unkorrupted	Renault Mégane RS	1st	11th	5th	1st	16
2	1	(Sweden) Johan Kristoffersson	KYB EKS JC	Audi S1	2nd	1st	4th	7th	15
3	21	(Sweden) Timmy Hansen	Hansen World RX Team	Peugeot 208	5th	2nd	2nd	3rd	14
4	9	(Sweden) Kevin Hansen	Hansen World RX Team	Peugeot 208	4th	3rd	3rd	5th	13
5	68	(Finland) Niclas Grönholm	GRX-SET World RX Team	Hyundai i20	8th	12th	1st	2nd	12
6	23	(Hungary) Krisztián Szabó	GRX-SET World RX Team	Hyundai i20	6th	5th	8th	4th	11
7	44	(Germany) Timo Scheider	ALL-INKL.COM Münnich Motorsport	SEAT Ibiza	3rd	7th	6th	9th	10
8	91	(Belgium) Enzo Ide	KYB EKS JC	Audi S1	9th	4th	10th	6th	9
9	92	(Sweden) Anton Marklund	Hedströms Motorsport	Hyundai i20	7th	8th	7th	8th	8
10	18	(Finland) Juha Rytkönen	Juha Rytkönen	Ford Fiesta MK8	10th	6th	9th	10th	7
11	84	(France) Hervé "Knapick" Lemonnier	Hervé Knapick	Citroën DS3	12th	10th	11th	11th	6
12	2	(Republic of Ireland) Ollie O'Donovan	Oliver O'Donovan	Ford Fiesta	11th	9th	12th	12th	5

=== Semi-finals ===
Semi-Final 1

Pos.	No.	Driver	Team	Time	Pts
1	9	(Sweden) Kevin Hansen	Hansen World RX Team	3:15.734	6
2	92	(Sweden) Anton Marklund	Hedströms Motorsport	+ 1.712	5
3*	21	(Sweden) Timmy Hansen	Hansen World RX Team	+ 2.490	4
4	84	(France) Hervé "Knapick" Lemonnier	Hervé Knapick	+ 10.270	3
5	69	(Netherlands) Kevin Abbring	Unkorrupted	+17.334 and 2 laps	2
6	44	(Germany) Timo Scheider	ALL-INKL.COM Münnich Motorsport	DNF	1

- Note: Semi-Final 1 race winner Timmy Hansen was handed a five-second penalty, as the driver to hit Kevin Abbring at the Raidillon hairpin.

Semi-Final 2

Pos.	No.	Driver	Team	Time	Pts
1	1	(Sweden) Johan Kristoffersson	KYB EKS JC	3:13.105	6
2	23	(Hungary) Krisztián Szabó	GRX-SET World RX Team	+ 2.648	5
3	91	(Belgium) Enzo Ide	KYB EKS JC	+ 3.974	4
4	68	(Finland) Niclas Grönholm	GRX-SET World RX Team	+ 4.973	3
5	84	(Finland) Juha Rytkönen	Juha Rytkönen	+ 5.674	2
6	2	(Republic of Ireland) Ollie O'Donovan	Oliver O'Donovan	+ 2 laps	1

=== Final ===
Pos.	No.	Driver	Team	Time	Pts
1	1	(Sweden) Johan Kristoffersson	KYB EKS JC	3:10.857	8
2	9	(Sweden) Kevin Hansen	Hansen World RX Team	+ 2.601	5
3	23	(Hungary) Krisztián Szabó	GRX-SET World RX Team	+ 5.338	4
4	21	(Sweden) Timmy Hansen	Hansen World RX Team	+ 5.663	3
5	91	(Belgium) Enzo Ide	KYB EKS JC	+ 6.119	2
6	92	(Sweden) Anton Marklund	Hedströms Motorsport	+ 6.648	1

== Standings after the event ==
Pos.	Driver	Pts	Gap
1	(Sweden) Timmy Hansen	151	
2	(Sweden) Johan Kristoffersson	139	+12
3	(Sweden) Kevin Hansen	136	+15
4	(Finland) Niclas Grönholm	123	+28
5	(Hungary) Krisztián Szabó	108	+43
6	(Netherlands) Kevin Abbring	97	+54

- Note: Only the top six positions are included.

Previous race: 2021 World RX of Riga	FIA World Rallycross Championship; 2021 season	Next race: 2021 World RX of Montalegre
Previous race: 2019 World RX of Benelux	World RX of Benelux	Next race: 2022 World RX of Benelux
