= 2014 Rally México =

Motor rally competition

2014 Rally México 28º Rally Guanajuato México
Round 3 of 13 of the 2014 World Rally Championship
← Previous event	Next event →
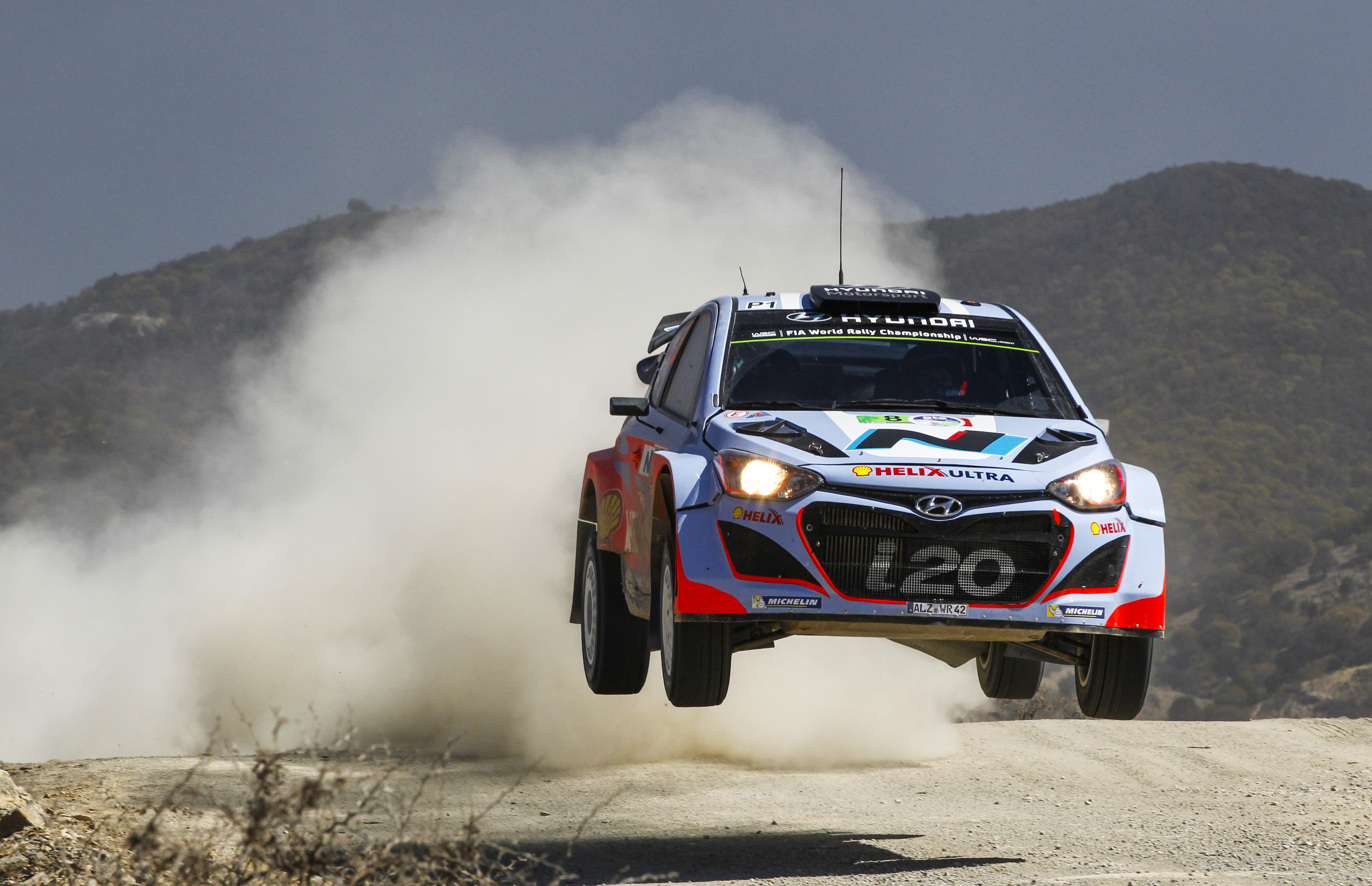
- Chris Atkinson during Rally with Jump
- Host country: Mexico
- Rally base: (Mexico) León
- Dates run: 6 – 9 March 2014
- Stages: 22 (399.93 km; 248.50 miles)
- Stage surface: Gravel

Statistics
- Crews: 26 at start

The Rally Mexico competition in 2014 was won by the French drivers Sébastien Ogier and Julien Ingrassia for the Volkswagen Motorsport team.

== Entry list ==
Notable entrants
No.	Entrant	Class	Driver	Co-driver	Car	Tyre
1	(Germany) Volkswagen Motorsport	WRC	(France) Sébastien Ogier	(France) Julien Ingrassia	Volkswagen Polo R WRC	M
2	(Germany) Volkswagen Motorsport	WRC	(Finland) Jari-Matti Latvala	(Finland) Miikka Anttila	Volkswagen Polo R WRC	M
3	(France) Citroën Total Abu Dhabi WRT	WRC	(United Kingdom) Kris Meeke	(Republic of Ireland) Paul Nagle	Citroën DS3 WRC	M
4	(France) Citroën Total Abu Dhabi WRT	WRC	(Norway) Mads Østberg	(Sweden) Jonas Andersson	Citroën DS3 WRC	M
5	(United Kingdom) M-Sport World Rally Team	WRC	(Finland) Mikko Hirvonen	(Finland) Jarmo Lehtinen	Ford Fiesta RS WRC	M
6	(United Kingdom) M-Sport World Rally Team	WRC	(United Kingdom) Elfyn Evans	(United Kingdom) Daniel Barritt	Ford Fiesta RS WRC	M
7	(Germany) Hyundai Motorsport	WRC	(Belgium) Thierry Neuville	(Belgium) Nicolas Gilsoul	Hyundai i20 WRC	M
8	(Germany) Hyundai Motorsport	WRC	(Australia) Chris Atkinson	(Belgium) Stéphane Prévot	Hyundai i20 WRC	M
9	(Germany) Volkswagen Motorsport II	WRC	(Norway) Andreas Mikkelsen	(Finland) Mikko Markkula	Volkswagen Polo R WRC	M
10	(United Kingdom) RK M-Sport World Rally Team	WRC	(Poland) Robert Kubica	(Poland) Maciej Szczepaniak	Ford Fiesta RS WRC	M
11	(United Kingdom) M-Sport World Rally Team	WRC	(Mexico) Benito Guerra	(Spain) Borja Rozada	Ford Fiesta RS WRC	M
21	(Czech Republic) Jipocar Czech National Team	WRC	(Czech Republic) Martin Prokop	(Czech Republic) Jan Tománek	Ford Fiesta RS WRC	M
32	(Ukraine) Yuriy Protasov	WRC-2	(Ukraine) Yuriy Protasov	(Ukraine) Pavlo Cherepin	Ford Fiesta R5	M
33	(Italy) www.Rallyproject.com srl	WRC-2	(Italy) Massimiliano Rendina	(Italy) Mario Pizzuti	Mitsubishi Lancer Evo X	P
34	ABR Paraguay by Astra	WRC-2	(Paraguay) Augusto Bestard	(Paraguay) Fernando Mendonca	Mitsubishi Lancer Evo X	P
35	(United Kingdom) Drive DMACK	WRC-2	(Estonia) Ott Tänak	(Estonia) Raigo Mõlder	Ford Fiesta R5	D
36	(France) Quentin Gilbert	WRC-2	(France) Quentin Gilbert	(Belgium) Renaud Jamoul	Ford Fiesta R5	D
37	(Italy) FWRT s.r.l.	WRC-2	(Italy) Lorenzo Bertelli	(Italy) Mitia Dotta	Ford Fiesta RRC	P
38	(Italy) Gianluca Linari	WRC-2	(Italy) Gianluca Linari	(Italy) Nicola Arena	Subaru Impreza WRX STi	D
41	(Peru) Nicolás Fuchs	WRC-2	(Peru) Nicolás Fuchs	(Argentina) Fernando Mussano	Ford Fiesta RRC	D
71	(Mexico) Ricardo Triviño		(Mexico) Ricardo Triviño	(Spain) Alex Haro	Mitsubishi Lancer Evo X	D
72	(Mexico) Rodrigo Salgado		(Mexico) Rodrigo Salgado	(Mexico) Diodoro Salgado	Ford Fiesta R5	D
73	(Peru) Jorge-Enrique Martinez		(Peru) Jorge-Enrique Martinez	(Peru) Eduardo-Luis Aservi	Subaru Impreza WRX STi	P
74	(Ecuador) Paul Zea Velasco		(Ecuador) Paul Zea Velasco	(Ecuador) Juan-Carlos Nuñez	Mitsubishi Lancer Evo X	D
76	(Mexico) Ricardo Cordero		(Mexico) Ricardo Cordero	(Mexico) Marco-A. Hernandez	Mitsubishi Lancer Evo X	P
78	(Mexico) Luis Orduña Jr.		(Mexico) Luis Orduña Jr.	(Mexico) Guillermo Fonseca	Ford Fiesta ST	P

Icon	Class
WRC	WRC entries eligible to score manufacturer points
WRC	Major entry ineligible to score manufacturer points
WRC-2	Registered to take part in WRC-2 championship
WRC-3	Registered to take part in WRC-3 championship

== Results ==
=== Event standings ===
Pos.	No.	Driver	Co-driver	Team	Car	Class	Time	Difference	Points
Overall classification
1	1	(France) Sébastien Ogier	(France) Julien Ingrassia	(Germany) Volkswagen Motorsport	Volkswagen Polo R WRC	WRC	4:27:41.8	0.00	28
2	2	(Finland) Jari-Matti Latvala	(Finland) Miikka Anttila	(Germany) Volkswagen Motorsport	Volkswagen Polo R WRC	WRC	4:28:54.4	+1:12.6	20
3	7	(Belgium) Thierry Neuville	(Belgium) Nicolas Gilsoul	(Germany) Hyundai Shell World Rally Team	Hyundai i20 WRC	WRC	4:33:10.4	+5:28.6	15
4	6	(United Kingdom) Elfyn Evans	(United Kingdom) Daniel Barritt	(United Kingdom) M-Sport World Rally Team	Ford Fiesta RS WRC	WRC	4:34:31.1	+6:49.3	12
5	21	(Czech Republic) Martin Prokop	(Czech Republic) Jan Tománek	(Czech Republic) Jipocar Czech National Team	Ford Fiesta RS WRC	WRC	4:37:36.2	+9:54.4	10
6	11	(Mexico) Benito Guerra	(Spain) Borja Rozada	(United Kingdom) M-Sport World Rally Team	Ford Fiesta RS WRC	WRC	4:37:36.2	+9:54.4	8
7	8	(Australia) Chris Atkinson	(Belgium) Stéphane Prévot	(Germany) Hyundai Shell World Rally Team	Hyundai i20 WRC	WRC	4:42:57.2	+15:15.4	6
8	5	(Finland) Mikko Hirvonen	(Finland) Jarmo Lehtinen	(United Kingdom) M-Sport WRT	Ford Fiesta RS WRC	WRC	4:44:48.6	+17:06.8	5
9	4	(Norway) Mads Østberg	(Sweden) Jonas Andersson	(France) Citroën Total Abu Dhabi WRT	Citroën DS3 WRC	WRC	4:53:23.4	+25:41.6	2
10	32	(Ukraine) Yuriy Protasov	(Ukraine) Pavlo Cherepin	(Ukraine) Yuriy Protasov	Ford Fiesta R5	WRC-2	4:56:00.0	+28:18.2	1
WRC-2 standings
1 (10.)	32	(Ukraine) Yuriy Protasov	(Ukraine) Pavlo Cherepin	(Ukraine) Yuriy Protasov	Ford Fiesta R5	WRC-2	4:56:00.0	+28:18.2	25
2 (13.)	37	(Italy) Lorenzo Bertelli	(Italy) Mitia Dotta	(Italy) FWRT s.r.l.	Ford Fiesta RRC	WRC-2	5:19:43.9	+52:02.1	18
3 (14.)	33	(Italy) Massimiliano Rendina	(Italy) Mario Pizzuti	(Italy) www.Rallyproject.com srl	Mitsubishi Lancer Evo X	WRC-2	5:18:59.8	+52:08.0	15
4 (15.)	35	(Estonia) Ott Tänak	(Estonia) Raigo Mõlder	(United Kingdom) Drive DMACK	Ford Fiesta R5	WRC-2	5:22:19.2	+54:37.4	12
5 (17.)	38	(Italy) Gianluca Linari	(Italy) Nicola Arena	(Italy) Gianluca Linari	Subaru Impreza WRX STi	WRC-2	5:23:38.8	+55:57.0	10
6 (18.)	41	(Peru) Nicolás Fuchs	(Argentina) Fernando Mussano	(Peru) Nicolás Fuchs	Ford Fiesta RRC	WRC-2	5:25:27.0	+57:45.2	8
7 (21.)	34	(Paraguay) Augusto Bestard	(Paraguay) Fernando Mendonca	ABR Paraguay by Astra	Mitsubishi Lancer Evo X	WRC-2	5:52:33.7	+1:24:51.9	6

== Championship standings after the race ==
=== WRC ===
Drivers' Championship standings

Pos.	Driver	Points
1	(France) Sebastien Ogier	63
2	(Finland) Jari-Matti Latvala	60
3	(Norway) Mads Østberg	32
4	(Norway) Andreas Mikkelsen	24
5	(United Kingdom) Elfyn Evans	20

Manufacturers' Championship standings

Pos.	Constructor	Points
1	(Germany) Volkswagen Motorsport	115
2	(France) Citroen Total Abu Dhabi WRT	60
3	(United Kingdom) M-Sport World Rally Team	40
4	(Germany) Hyundai Shell World Rally Team	31
5	(Germany) Volkswagen Motorsport II	28

=== Other ===
WRC2 Drivers' Championship standings

Pos.	Driver	Points
1	(Ukraine) Yuriy Protasov	60
2	(Italy) Lorenzo Bertelli	44
3	(Estonia) Karl Kruuda	25
4	(Italy) Massimiliano Rendina	25
5	(Finland) Jari Ketomaa	18

WRC3 Drivers' Championship standings

Pos.	Driver	Points
1	(France) Quentin Gilbert	25
