= 2018 World RX of Portugal =

Rallycross event

- Round 2 of 12 in the 2018 FIA World Rallycross Championship
- Date: 27–29 April 2018
- Location: Montalegre, Vila Real
- Venue: Pista Automóvel de Montalegre

Results
Heat winners
- Heat 1: (France) Sébastien Loeb; Team Peugeot Total
- Heat 2: (Sweden) Timmy Hansen; Team Peugeot Total
- Heat 3: (Norway) Andreas Bakkerud; EKS Audi Sport
- Heat 4: (Norway) Andreas Bakkerud; EKS Audi Sport
Semi-final winners
- Semi-final 1: Johan Kristoffersson; PSRX Volkswagen Sweden
- Semi-final 2: (Sweden) Timmy Hansen; Team Peugeot Total
Final
- First: Johan Kristoffersson; PSRX Volkswagen Sweden
- Second: (France) Sébastien Loeb; Team Peugeot Total
- Third: (Norway) Petter Solberg; PSRX Volkswagen Sweden

World RX layout of Pista Automóvel de Montalegre

The 2018 World RX of Portugal was the second round of the fifth season of the FIA World Rallycross Championship. The event was held at the Pista Automóvel de Montalegre in Montalegre, Vila Real.

== Qualifying ==
Pos.	No.	Driver	Team	Car	Q1	Q2	Q3	Q4	Pts
1	13	(Norway) Andreas Bakkerud	EKS Audi Sport	Audi S1	5th	5th	1st	1st	16
2	9	(France) Sébastien Loeb	Team Peugeot Total	Peugeot 208	1st	2nd	6th	2nd	15
3	5	(Sweden) Mattias Ekström	EKS Audi Sport	Audi S1	2nd	3rd	7th	3rd	14
4	21	(Sweden) Timmy Hansen	Team Peugeot Total	Peugeot 208	6th	1st	4th	6th	13
5	1	(Sweden) Johan Kristoffersson	PSRX Volkswagen Sweden	Volkswagen Polo R	3rd	6th	2nd	4th	12
6	11	(Norway) Petter Solberg	PSRX Volkswagen Sweden	Volkswagen Polo R	10th	4th	3rd	2nd	11
7	71	(Sweden) Kevin Hansen	Team Peugeot Total	Peugeot 208	11th	8th	5th	9th	10
8	96	(Sweden) Kevin Eriksson	Olsbergs MSE	Ford Fiesta	7th	9th	9th	12th	9
9	68	(Finland) Niclas Grönholm	GRX Taneco Team	Hyundai i20	8th	7th	8th	14th	8
10	6	(Latvia) Jānis Baumanis	STARD	Ford Fiesta	12th	10th	10th	8th	7
11	36	(France) Guerlain Chicherit	GC Kompetition	Renault Mégane RS	4th	11th	15th	10th	6
12	7	(Russia) Timur Timerzyanov	GRX Taneco Team	Hyundai i20	9th	13th	12th	7th	5
13	4	(Sweden) Robin Larsson	Olsbergs MSE	Ford Fiesta	13th	12th	13th	11th	4
14	74	(France) Jérôme Grosset-Janin	GC Kompetition	Renault Mégane RS	15th	14th	11th	16th	3
15	66	(France) Grégoire Demoustier	Sébastien Loeb Racing	Peugeot 208	14th	15th	17th	13th	2
16	42	(United Kingdom) Oliver Bennett	Oliver Bennett	MINI Cooper	18th	17th	16th	15th	1
17	41	(Portugal) Joaquim Santos	Bompiso Racing Team	Ford Focus	16th	16th	18th	18th	
18	75	(Portugal) Mário Barbosa	Mário Barbosa	Citroën DS3	17th	18th	14th	17th	

== Semi-finals ==
Semi-final 1

Pos.	No.	Driver	Team	Time/Retired	Pts
1	1	(Sweden) Johan Kristoffersson	PSRX Volkswagen Sweden	3:59.048	6
2	13	(Norway) Andreas Bakkerud	EKS Audi Sport	+1.570	5
3	36	(France) Guerlain Chicherit	GC Kompetition	+3.332	4
4	5	(Sweden) Mattias Ekström	EKS Audi Sport	+3.832	3
5	68	(Finland) Niclas Grönholm	GRX Taneco Team	+4.141	2
6	71	(Sweden) Kevin Hansen	Team Peugeot Total	DNF	1

Semi-final 2

Pos.	No.	Driver	Team	Time/Retired	Pts
1	21	(Sweden) Timmy Hansen	Team Peugeot Total	4:14.812	6
2	9	(France) Sébastien Loeb	Team Peugeot Total	+0.398	5
3	11	(Norway) Petter Solberg	PSRX Volkswagen Sweden	+0.774	4
4	6	(Latvia) Jānis Baumanis	STARD	+4.957	3
5	96	(Sweden) Kevin Eriksson	Olsbergs MSE	+5.455	2
6	7	(Russia) Timur Timerzyanov	GRX Taneco Team	+10.491	1

== Final ==
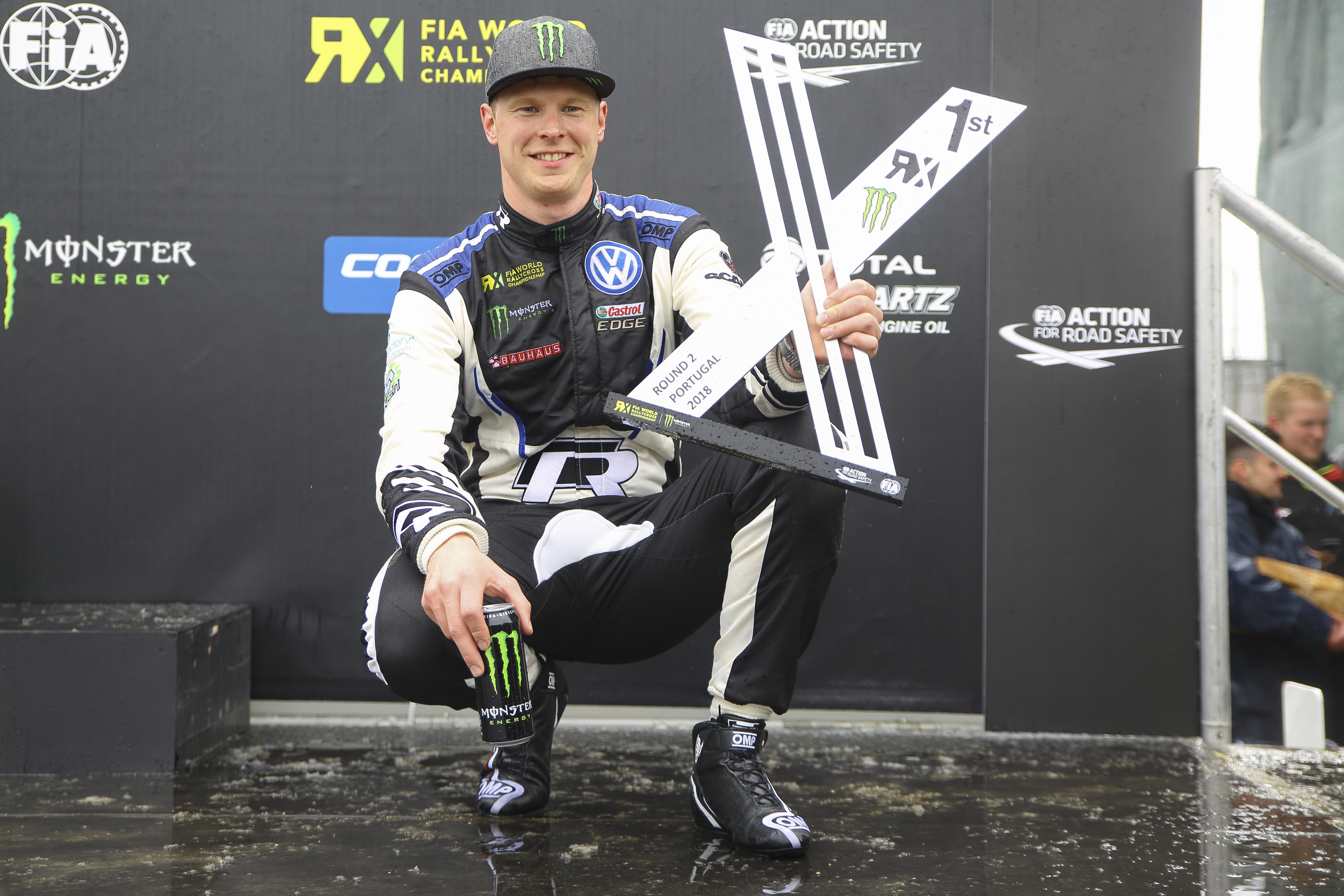
2018 World RX of Portugal winner Johan Kristoffersson

Pos.	No.	Driver	Team	Time/Retired	Pts
1	1	(Sweden) Johan Kristoffersson	PSRX Volkswagen Sweden	4:16.859	8
2	9	(France) Sébastien Loeb	Team Peugeot Total	+2.253	5
3	11	(Norway) Petter Solberg	PSRX Volkswagen Sweden	+3.938	4
4	13	(Norway) Andreas Bakkerud	EKS Audi Sport	+6.642	3
5	36	(France) Guerlain Chicherit	GC Kompetition	+9.566	2
6	21	(Sweden) Timmy Hansen	Team Peugeot Total	+21.244	1

== Standings after the event ==
Pos	Driver	Pts	Gap
1	(Sweden) Johan Kristoffersson	53	
2	(Norway) Andreas Bakkerud	44	+9
3	(Norway) Petter Solberg	43	+10
4	(France) Sébastien Loeb	39	+14
5	(Sweden) Mattias Ekström	36	+17
5	(Sweden) Timmy Hansen	36	+17

- Note: Only the top five positions are included.

Previous race: 2018 World RX of Barcelona	FIA World Rallycross Championship; 2018 season	Next race: 2018 World RX of Belgium
Previous race: 2017 World RX of Portugal	World RX of Portugal	Next race: 2021 World RX of Portugal
