= 2021 World RX of France =

Season of motor racing

- Round 3 of 9 in the 2021 FIA World Rallycross Championship
- Date: 3-5 September 2021
- Location: Lohéac, Bretagne
- Venue: Circuit de Lohéac

Results
Heat winners
- Heat 1: (Finland) Niclas Grönholm; GRX-SET World RX Team
- Heat 2: (Sweden) Johan Kristoffersson; KYB EKS JC
- Heat 3: (Sweden) Johan Kristoffersson; KYB EKS JC
- Heat 4: (Sweden) Timmy Hansen; Hansen World RX Team
Semi-final winners
- Semi-final 1: (Sweden) Timmy Hansen; Hansen World RX Team
- Semi-final 2: (Sweden) Kevin Hansen; Hansen World RX Team
Final
- First: (Sweden) Timmy Hansen; Hansen World RX Team
- Second: (Sweden) Kevin Hansen; Hansen World RX Team
- Third: (Finland) Niclas Grönholm; GRX-SET World RX Team

World RX layout of Circuit de Lohéac

The 2021 Bretagne World RX of Lohéac was the third round of the eighth season of the FIA World Rallycross Championship. The event was held at the Circuit de Lohéac in the Lohéac commune of Bretagne.

== World RX1 Championship ==
=== Heats ===
Pos.	No.	Driver	Team	Car	Q1	Q2	Q3	Q4	Pts
1	1	(Sweden) Johan Kristoffersson	KYB EKS JC	Audi S1	2nd	1st	1st	2nd	16
2	68	(Finland) Niclas Grönholm	GRX-SET World RX Team	Hyundai i20	1st	3rd	5th	3rd	15
3	21	(Sweden) Timmy Hansen	Hansen World RX Team	Peugeot 208	4th	7th	3rd	1st	14
4	9	(Sweden) Kevin Hansen	Hansen World RX Team	Peugeot 208	3rd	4th	2nd	5th	13
5	69	(Netherlands) Kevin Abbring	Unkorrupted	Renault Mégane RS	6th	2nd	6th	4th	12
6	23	(Hungary) Krisztián Szabó	GRX-SET World RX Team	Hyundai i20	5th	6th	4th	7th	11
7	44	(Germany) Timo Scheider	ALL-INKL.COM Münnich Motorsport	SEAT Ibiza	8th	5th	8th	6th	10
8	91	(Belgium) Enzo Ide	KYB EKS JC	Audi S1	7th	8th	7th	8th	9
9	2	(Republic of Ireland) Ollie O'Donovan	Oliver O'Donovan	Ford Fiesta	10th	10th	9th	9th	8
10	84	(France) Hervé "Knapick" Lemonnier	Hervé Knapick	Citroën DS3	9th	9th	10th	10th	7

=== Semi-finals ===
Semi-Final 1

Pos.	No.	Driver	Team	Time	Pts
1	21	(Sweden) Timmy Hansen	Hansen World RX Team	3:45.037	6
2	44	(Germany) Timo Scheider	ALL-INKL.COM Münnich Motorsport	+ 1.073	5
3*	1	(Sweden) Johan Kristoffersson	KYB EKS JC	+ 2.276	4
4*	69	(Netherlands) Kevin Abbring	Unkorrupted	+ 2.339	3
5	2	(Republic of Ireland) Ollie O'Donovan	Oliver O'Donovan	+ 11.825	2

- Note: Johan Kristoffersson missed the Final race start cut-off by gearbox failure, so first reserve driver Kevin Abbring took his place.

Semi-Final 2

Pos.	No.	Driver	Team	Time	Pts
1	9	(Sweden) Kevin Hansen	Hansen World RX Team	3:44.937	6
2	23	(Hungary) Krisztián Szabó	GRX-SET World RX Team	+ 1.177	5
3	68	(Finland) Niclas Grönholm	GRX-SET World RX Team	+ 1.571	4
4	91	(Belgium) Enzo Ide	KYB EKS JC	+ 1.968	3
5	84	(France) Hervé "Knapick" Lemonnier	Hervé Knapick	+ 9.976	2

=== Final ===
Pos.	No.	Driver	Team	Time	Pts
1	21	(Sweden) Timmy Hansen	Hansen World RX Team	3:44.217	8
2	9	(Sweden) Kevin Hansen	Hansen World RX Team	+ 0.652	5
3	68	(Finland) Niclas Grönholm	GRX-SET World RX Team	+ 2.235	4
4	69	(Netherlands) Kevin Abbring	Unkorrupted	+ 4.729	3
5	23	(Hungary) Krisztián Szabó	GRX-SET World RX Team	+ 4.968	2
6	44	(Germany) Timo Scheider	ALL-INKL.COM Münnich Motorsport	+ 12.702	1

== Standings after the event ==
Pos.	Driver	Pts	Gap
1	(Sweden) Timmy Hansen	85	
2	(Sweden) Kevin Hansen	75	+10
3	(Hungary) Krisztián Szabó	58	+27
4	(Sweden) Johan Kristoffersson	57	+28
5	(Netherlands) Kevin Abbring	55	+30
6	(Finland) Niclas Grönholm	51	+34

- Note: Only the top six positions are included.

Previous race: 2021 World RX of Sweden	FIA World Rallycross Championship; 2021 season	Next race: 2021 World RX of Riga
Previous race: 2019 World RX of France	World RX of France	Next race: -
