= 2021 World RX of Portugal =

Season of motor racing

- Round 7 of 9 in the 2021 FIA World Rallycross Championship
- Date: 16–17 October 2021
- Location: Montalegre, Vila Real
- Venue: Pista Automóvel de Montalegre

Results
Heat winners
- Heat 1: (Sweden) Timmy Hansen; Hansen World RX Team
- Heat 2: (Sweden) Timmy Hansen; Hansen World RX Team
- Heat 3: (Sweden) Timmy Hansen; Hansen World RX Team
- Heat 4: (Sweden) Kevin Hansen; Hansen World RX Team
Semi-final winners
- Semi-final 1: (Sweden) Timmy Hansen; Hansen World RX Team
- Semi-final 2: (Sweden) Johan Kristoffersson; KYB EKS JC
Final
- First: (Finland) Niclas Grönholm; GRX-SET World RX Team
- Second: (Sweden) Timmy Hansen; Hansen World RX Team
- Third: (Sweden) Kevin Hansen; Hansen World RX Team

World RX layout of Pista Automóvel de Montalegre

The 2021 Cooper Tires World RX of Montalegre was the seventh round of the eighth season of the FIA World Rallycross Championship. The event was held at the Pista Automóvel de Montalegre in Montalegre, Vila Real.

== World RX1 Championship ==
=== Heats ===
Pos.	No.	Driver	Team	Car	Q1	Q2	Q3	Q4	Pts
1	21	(Sweden) Timmy Hansen	Hansen World RX Team	Peugeot 208	1st	1st	1st	6th	16
2	1	(Sweden) Johan Kristoffersson	KYB EKS JC	Audi S1	6th	2nd	2nd	2nd	15
3	9	(Sweden) Kevin Hansen	Hansen World RX Team	Peugeot 208	4th	4th	3rd	1st	14
4	68	(Finland) Niclas Grönholm	GRX-SET World RX Team	Hyundai i20	2nd	3rd	4th	4th	13
5	23	(Hungary) Krisztián Szabó	GRX-SET World RX Team	Hyundai i20	5th	5th	5th	3rd	12
6	91	(Belgium) Enzo Ide	KYB EKS JC	Audi S1	3rd	6th	6th	5th	11
7	2	(Republic of Ireland) Ollie O'Donovan	Oliver O'Donovan	Ford Fiesta	7th	7th	7th	7th	10

=== Semi-finals ===
Semi-Final 1

Pos.	No.	Driver	Team	Time	Pts
1	21	(Sweden) Timmy Hansen	Hansen World RX Team	3:55.687	6
2	9	(Sweden) Kevin Hansen	Hansen World RX Team	+ 0.813	5
3	23	(Hungary) Krisztián Szabó	GRX-SET World RX Team	+ 2.162	4
6	2	(Republic of Ireland) Ollie O'Donovan	Oliver O'Donovan	+ 27.308	3

Semi-Final 2

Pos.	No.	Driver	Team	Time	Pts
1	1	(Sweden) Johan Kristoffersson	KYB EKS JC	3:56.716	6
2	68	(Finland) Niclas Grönholm	GRX-SET World RX Team	+ 0.775	5
3	91	(Belgium) Enzo Ide	KYB EKS JC	+ 1.408	4

=== Final ===
Pos.	No.	Driver	Team	Time	Pts
1	68	(Finland) Niclas Grönholm	GRX-SET World RX Team	3:56.426	8
2	21	(Sweden) Timmy Hansen	Hansen World RX Team	+ 2.601	5
3	9	(Sweden) Kevin Hansen	Hansen World RX Team	+ 5.338	4
4	23	(Hungary) Krisztián Szabó	GRX-SET World RX Team	+ 2.270	3
5	91	(Belgium) Enzo Ide	KYB EKS JC	+ 3.762	2
6	1	(Sweden) Johan Kristoffersson	KYB EKS JC	+ 4.754	1

== Standings after the event ==
Pos.	Driver	Pts	Gap
1	(Sweden) Timmy Hansen	178	
2	(Sweden) Johan Kristoffersson	161	+17
3	(Sweden) Kevin Hansen	159	+19
4	(Finland) Niclas Grönholm	149	+29
5	(Hungary) Krisztián Szabó	127	+51
6	(Netherlands) Kevin Abbring	97	+81

- Note: Only the top six positions are included.

Previous race: 2021 World RX of Benelux	FIA World Rallycross Championship; 2021 season	Next race: 2021 World RX of Germany
Previous race: 2018 World RX of Portugal	World RX of Portugal	Next race: 2022 World RX of Portugal
