= World RX of Portugal =

Rallycross event held in Portugal

The World RX of Portugal was a rallycross event held in Portugal that is part of the FIA World Rallycross Championship. The event made its debut in the championship's inaugural 2014 season, at the Pista Automóvel de Montalegre in the northern town of Montalegre, close to the Spanish border. It was removed from the series calendar ahead of the 2019 season, marking the first time in the championship's history that the event was not run. The event was set to return in 2020 but was later cancelled due to the COVID-19 pandemic. On 12 May 2021; it was announced that the event would return in 2021 instead of the World RX of Norway as the final round of the calendar. For 2022 season Montalegre’s layout has been re-profiled, with the old joker lap now the first corner and a new, gravel joker from Turns Two to Five.

World RX layout of Pista Automóvel de Montalegre

== Past winners ==
Year	Heat 1 winner	Heat 2 winner	Heat 3 winner	Heat 4 winner	Semi-Final 1 winner	Semi-Final 2 winner	Final winner
2014	(Russia) Timur Timerzyanov	(Russia) Timur Timerzyanov	(Norway) Petter Solberg	(Norway) Petter Solberg	(Latvia) Reinis Nitišs	(Norway) Petter Solberg	(Norway) Petter Solberg
2015	(Norway) Andreas Bakkerud	(Norway) Petter Solberg	(Sweden) Timmy Hansen	(Norway) Petter Solberg	(Norway) Petter Solberg	(Sweden) Johan Kristoffersson	(Sweden) Johan Kristoffersson
Year	Qualifying 1 winner	Qualifying 2 winner	Qualifying 3 winner	Qualifying 4 winner	Semi-Final 1 winner	Semi-Final 2 winner	Final winner
2016	(Sweden) Johan Kristoffersson	(Sweden) Mattias Ekström	(Norway) Petter Solberg	(Sweden) Mattias Ekström	(Sweden) Johan Kristoffersson	(Norway) Petter Solberg	(Norway) Petter Solberg
2017	(Sweden) Johan Kristoffersson	(Sweden) Johan Kristoffersson	(Norway) Petter Solberg	(Norway) Andreas Bakkerud	(Norway) Petter Solberg	(Sweden) Mattias Ekström	(Sweden) Mattias Ekström
2018	(France) Sébastien Loeb	(Sweden) Timmy Hansen	(Norway) Andreas Bakkerud	(Norway) Andreas Bakkerud	(Sweden) Johan Kristoffersson	(Sweden) Timmy Hansen	(Sweden) Johan Kristoffersson
2020	Cancelled due the COVID-19 pandemic						
2021	(Sweden) Timmy Hansen	(Sweden) Timmy Hansen	(Sweden) Timmy Hansen	(Sweden) Kevin Hansen	(Sweden) Timmy Hansen	(Sweden) Johan Kristoffersson	(Finland) Niclas Grönholm
Year	Heat 1 winner	Heat 2 winner	Heat 3 winner	Progression best time	Semi-Final 1 winner	Semi-Final 2 winner	Final winner
2022	(Sweden) Johan Kristoffersson	(Sweden) Johan Kristoffersson	No Q3 (Double Header)	(Sweden) Timmy Hansen	(Norway) Ole Christian Veiby	(Sweden) Johan Kristoffersson	(Sweden) Johan Kristoffersson
2022	(Sweden) Johan Kristoffersson	(Sweden) Johan Kristoffersson	No Q3 (Double Header)	(Sweden) Timmy Hansen	(Finland) Niclas Grönholm	(Sweden) Johan Kristoffersson	(Finland) Niclas Grönholm
Year	Heat 1 winner	Heat 2 winner	Heat 3 winner	Heat 4 winner	Semi-Final 1 winner	Semi-Final 2 winner	Final winner
2023	(Sweden) Johan Kristoffersson	(Sweden) Johan Kristoffersson	(Sweden) Johan Kristoffersson	(Sweden) Johan Kristoffersson	(Sweden) Johan Kristoffersson	(Finland) Niclas Grönholm	(Sweden) Johan Kristoffersson
Year	Heat 1 Race 1 winner	Heat 1 Race 2 winner	Heat 2 Race 1 winner	Heat 2 Race 2 winner	Semi-Final 1 winner	Semi-Final 2 winner	Final winner
2024	(Sweden) Johan Kristoffersson	(Finland) Niclas Grönholm	(Finland) Niclas Grönholm	(Sweden) Kevin Hansen	(Sweden) Kevin Hansen	(Finland) Niclas Grönholm	(Sweden) Johan Kristoffersson
2024	(Sweden) Johan Kristoffersson	(Sweden) Timmy Hansen	(Sweden) Timmy Hansen	(Sweden) Kevin Hansen	(Sweden) Kevin Hansen	(Norway) Ole Christian Veiby	(Sweden) Kevin Hansen
Year					Semi-Final 1 winner	Semi-Final 2 winner	Final winner
2025					(Finland) Niclas Grönholm	(Sweden) Johan Kristoffersson	(Finland) Niclas Grönholm

== See also ==
- Rally de Portugal - event held as part of the World Rally Championship
- Portuguese Grand Prix – event held as part of the Formula One World Championship
- WTCR Race of Portugal – event held as part of the World Touring Car Championship and the World Touring Car Cup
