= Enzo Ide =

Belgian racecar driver

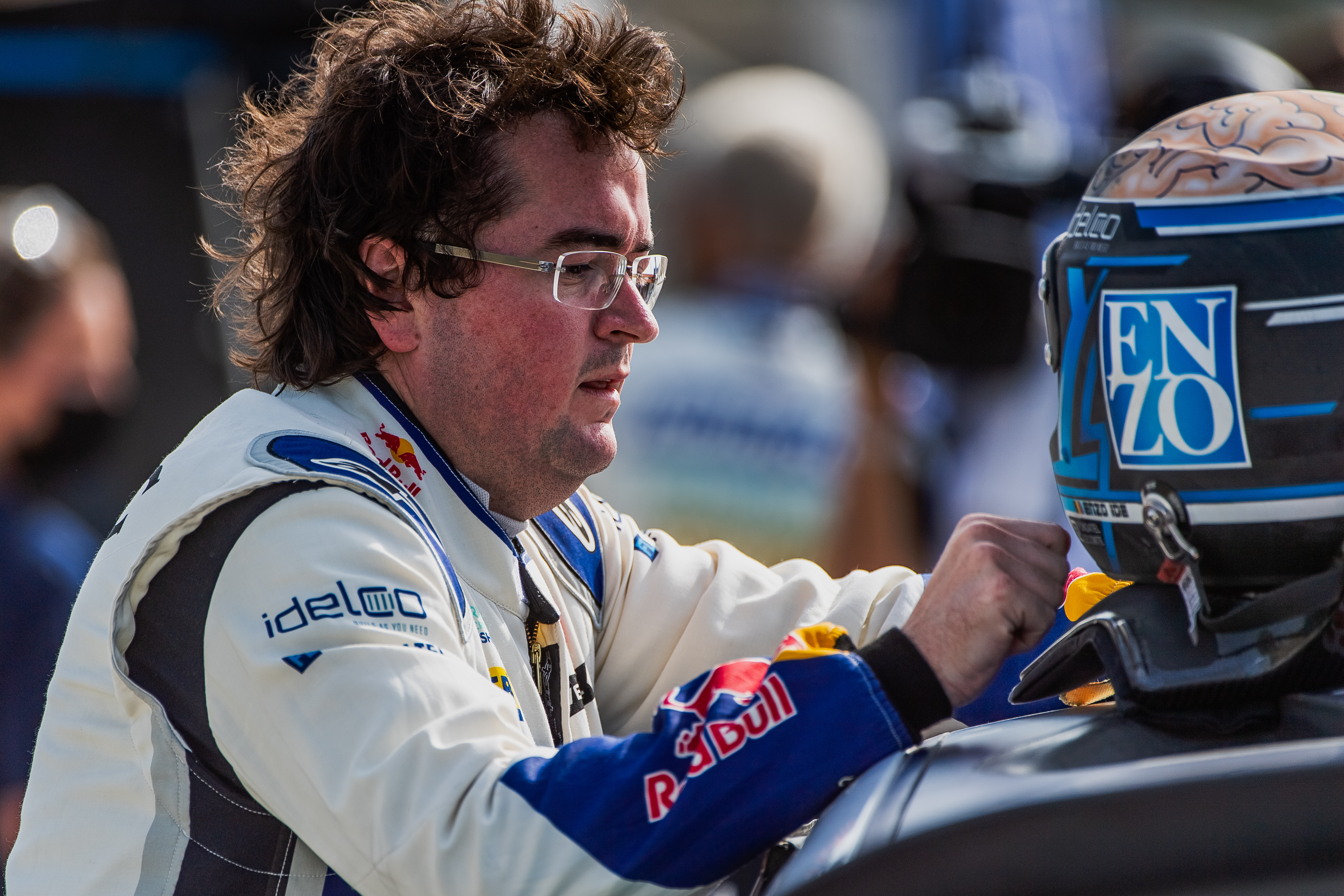
- Ide in 2021
- Nationality: (Belgium) Belgian
- Born: 22 June 1991 (age 35) Tielt, Belgium

FIA GT1 World Championship
- Categorisation: FIA Bronze (2010–2011); FIA Silver (2012–)
- Teams: AF Corse
- Car number: 4
- Starts: 18
- Wins: 0
- Poles: 0
- Fastest laps: 0
- Best finish: 14th in 2012

Previous series
- 2010–11 2010–11 2010 2010: FIA GT3 European Championship; Belcar; FFSA GT Championship; GT4 European Cup

Enzo Ide (born 22 June 1991 in Tielt) is a Belgian racing driver.

== Racing career ==
Ide began his racing career in Belcar, racing a Porsche 997 GT3 for Prospeed Competition, together with Ruben Maes. For 2011 he stepped up to the FIA GT3 European Championship, driving an Audi R8 LMS for Belgian Audi Club Team WRT. Sharing with Gregory Franchi for the first five rounds, he won races at the Autódromo Internacional do Algarve and the Circuito de Navarra. Franchi switched to the team's other car for the final round at Circuit Park Zandvoort, and Ide was partnered by Christopher Haase – winning the second race of the weekend. Ide finished third in the drivers' championship. He also continued racing in Belcar, also for WRT alongside François Verbist. The pair finished third in the final standings, winning the 24 Hours of Zolder together with Bert Longin and Xavier Maassen.

In 2012, Ide was racing in the FIA GT1 World Championship. He was driving a Ferrari 458 Italia GT3 for AF Corse, with reigning GT3 champion Francesco Castellacci as his co-driver.

In 2013, Ide was racing in the FIA GT Series with Anthony Kumpen and the Blancpain Endurance Series with Anthony Kumpen and Markus Winkelhock. Both championships were driven with the same Audi R8 LMS GT3 from Phoenix Racing GmbH.

In 2018, Ide would compete in the FIA World Rallycross Championship with Comtoyou Racing driving an Audi S1.

== Personal ==
Ide is the son of entrepreneur Joris Ide. He made the national media in Belgium after footage from his 18th birthday party laid on by his father was found on YouTube.

== Racing record ==
=== FIA GT competition results ===
==== GT1 World Championship results ====
Year	Team	Car	1	2	3	4	5	6	7	8	9	10	11	12	13	14	15	16	17	18	Pos	Points
2012	AF Corse	Ferrari	NOG; QR; 10	NOG; CR; 5	ZOL; QR; 7	ZOL; CR; 11	NAV; QR; 13	NAV; QR; 11	SVK; QR; 12	SVK; CR; 9	ALG; QR; 11	ALG; CR; 7	SVK; QR; 10	SVK; CR; Ret	MOS; QR; 8	MOS; CR; 6	NUR; QR; 10	NUR; CR; 7	DON; QR; 7	DON; CR; 5	14th	42

==== FIA GT Series results ====
Year	Class	Team	Car	1	2	3	4	5	6	7	8	9	10	11	12	Pos.	Points
2013	Pro	Phoenix Racing	Audi	NOG; QR; 4	NOG; CR; 4	ZOL; QR; 8	ZOL; CR; 6	ZAN; QR; 12	ZAN; QR; Ret	SVK; QR	SVK; CR	NAV; QR	NAV; CR	BAK; QR; 9	BAK; CR; 12	16th	24

=== Complete FIA World Rallycross Championship results ===
(key)

==== Supercar/RX1 ====
Year	Entrant	Car	1	2	3	4	5	6	7	8	9	10	WRX	Points
2019	Team JC Raceteknik	Audi S1	UAE	ESP	BEL; 18	GBR	NOR	SWE	CAN	FRA	LAT	RSA	33rd	0
2020	Enzo Ide	Audi S1 RX	SWE	SWE	FIN	FIN	LAT	LAT	ESP; 13	ESP; 12			22nd	11
2021	KYB EKS JC	Audi S1	BAR; 10	SWE; 4	FRA; 8	LAT; 9	LAT; 9	BEL; 5	PRT; 5	GER; 6	GER; 6		6th	125

Sporting positions
Preceded by Maximilian Buhk	Blancpain GT Series Sprint Cup Champion; 2016	Succeeded by Robin Frijns; Stuart Leonard
