= 2017 World RX of Portugal =

Rallycross event

- Round 2 of 12 in the 2017 FIA World Rallycross Championship
- Date: 22–23 April 2017
- Location: Montalegre, Vila Real
- Venue: Pista Automóvel de Montalegre

Results
Heat winners
- Heat 1: Johan Kristoffersson; PSRX Volkswagen Sweden
- Heat 2: Johan Kristoffersson; PSRX Volkswagen Sweden
- Heat 3: (Norway) Petter Solberg; PSRX Volkswagen Sweden
- Heat 4: (Norway) Andreas Bakkerud; Hoonigan Racing Division
Semi-final winners
- Semi-final 1: (Norway) Petter Solberg; PSRX Volkswagen Sweden
- Semi-final 2: (Sweden) Mattias Ekström; EKS RX
Final
- First: (Sweden) Mattias Ekström; EKS RX
- Second: (France) Sébastien Loeb; Team Peugeot-Hansen
- Third: Johan Kristoffersson; PSRX Volkswagen Sweden

World RX layout of Circuito Montalegre

The 2017 World RX of Portugal was the second round of the fourth season of the FIA World Rallycross Championship. The event was held at the Pista Automóvel de Montalegre in Montalegre, Vila Real.

== Supercar ==
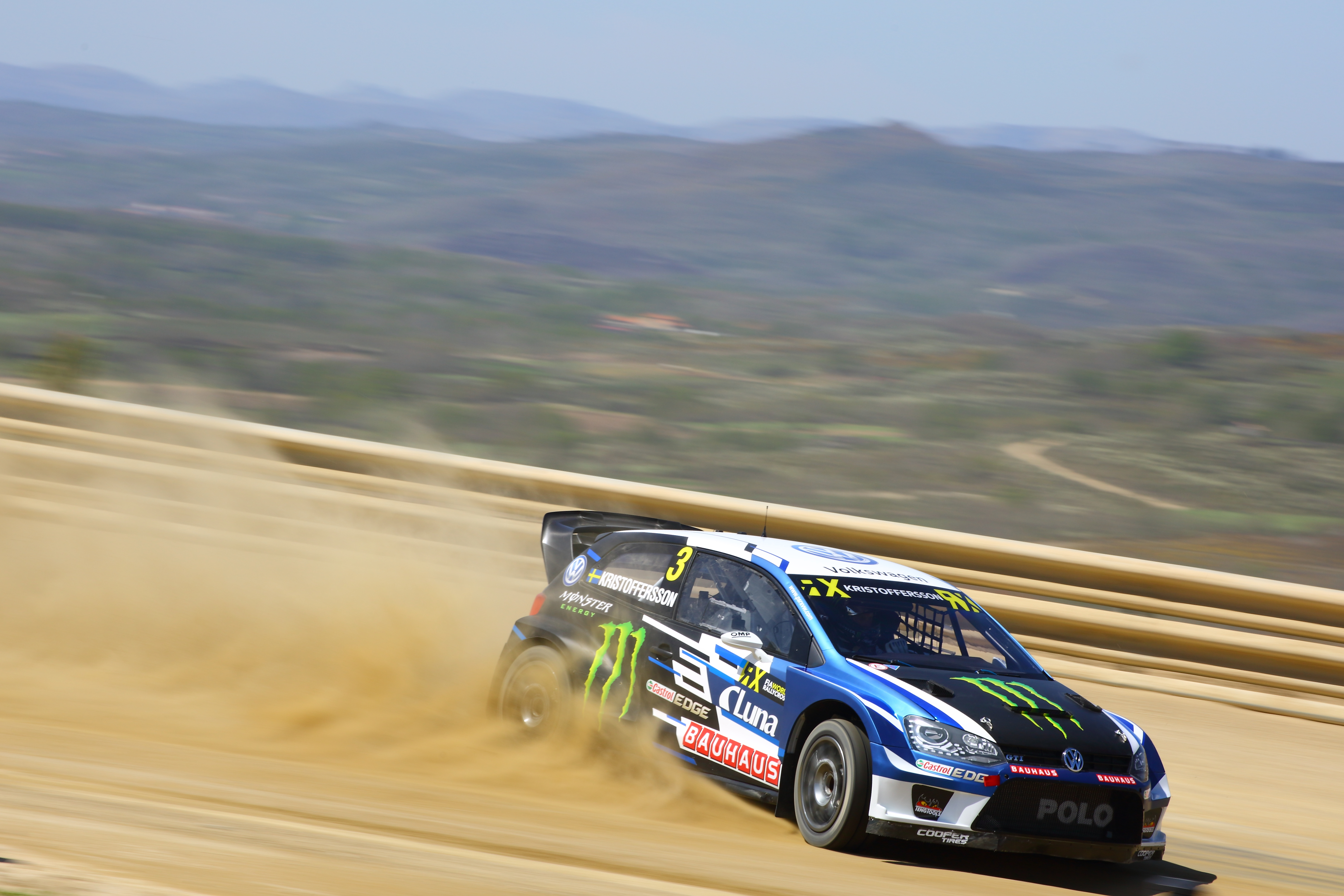
PSRX Volkswagen Sweden drivers Johan Kristoffersson (pictured) and Petter Solberg dominated the heats

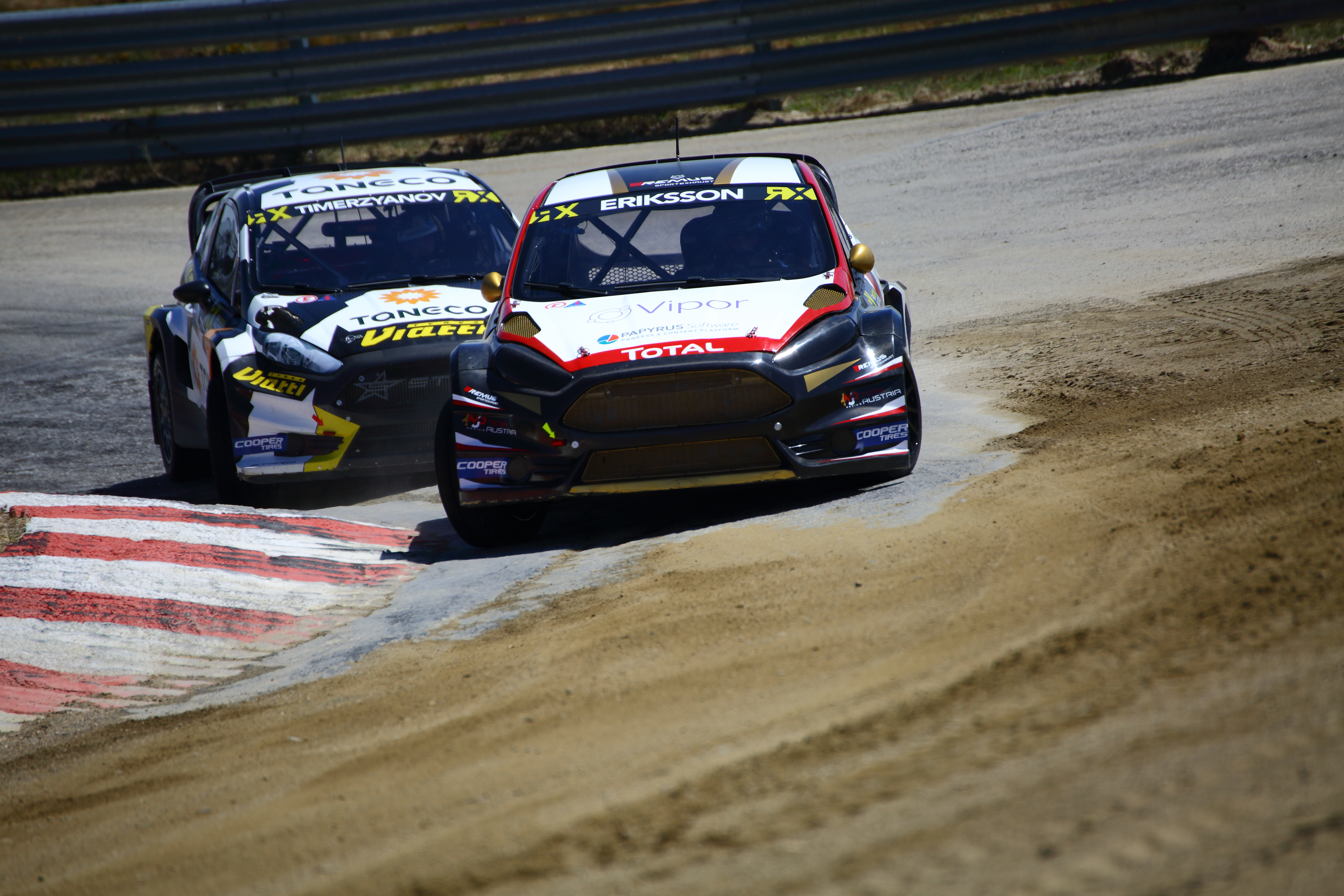
Timur Timerzyanov of STARD and Kevin Eriksson of World RX Team Austria

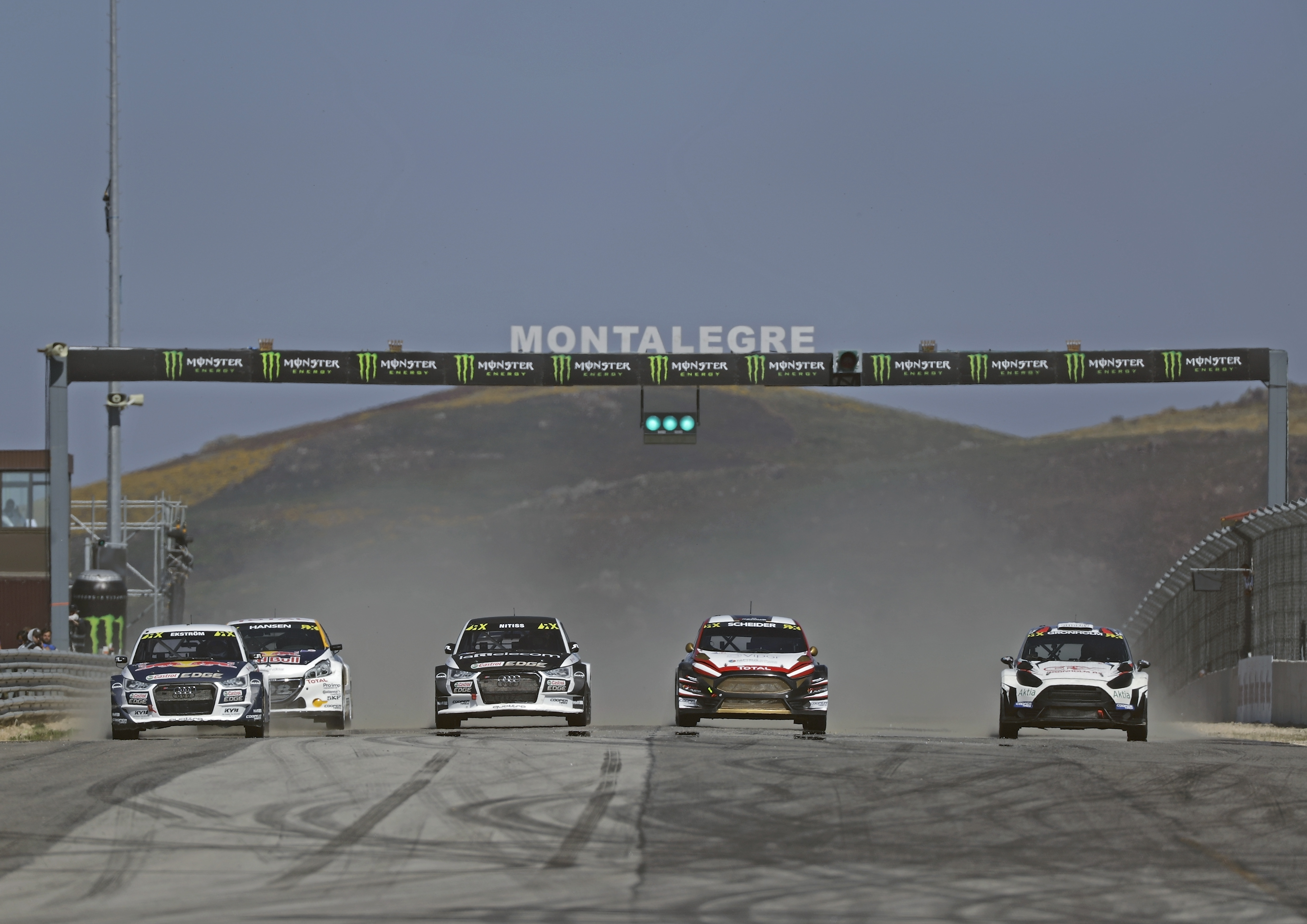
The start of Heat 3 Race 4 featuring Ekström, Kevin Hansen, Nitišs, Scheider and Grönholm

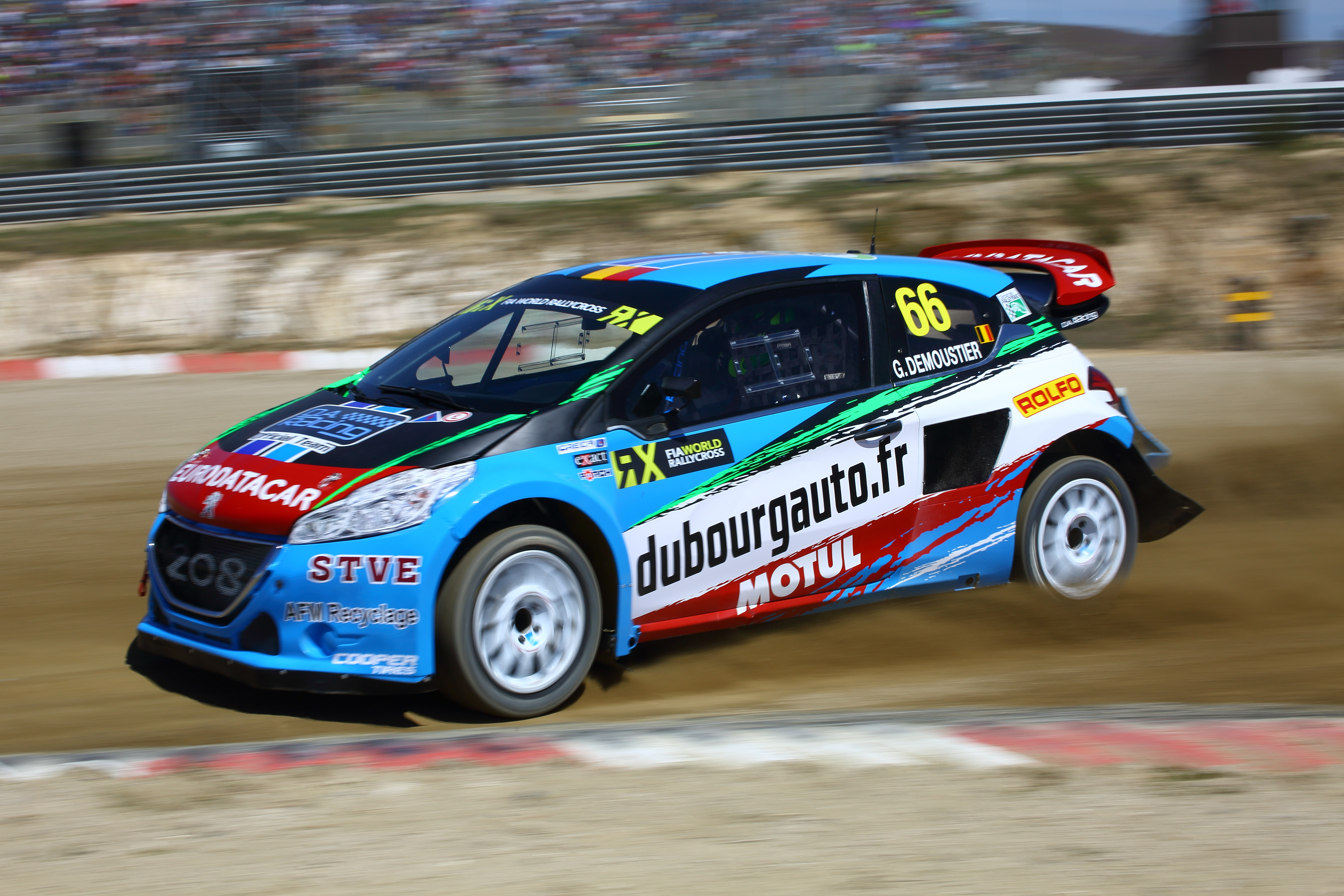
Grégoire Demoustier showed signs of improvement following his debut in the previous event

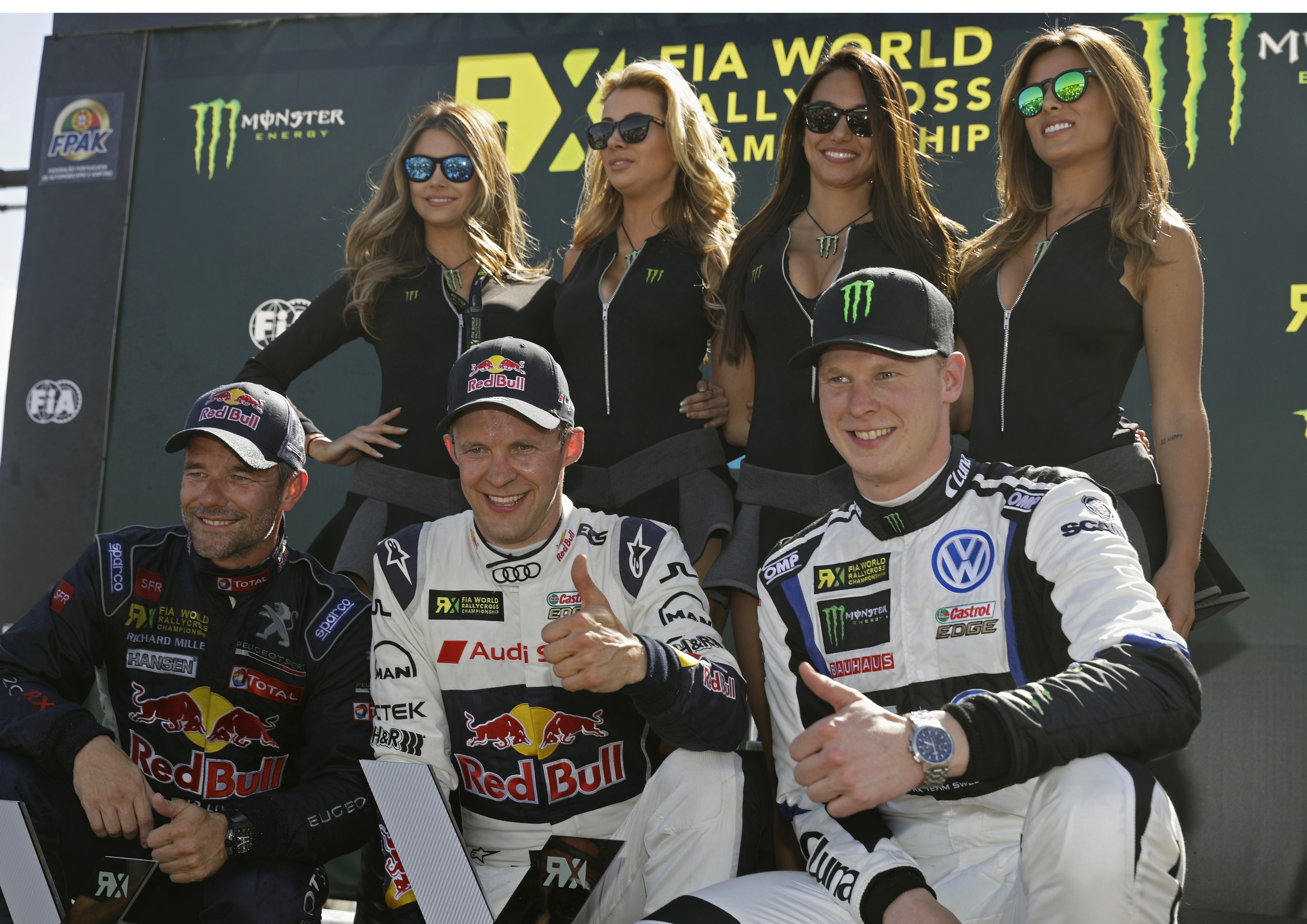
Defending champion Ekström made it two wins from as many starts in the 2017 season, beating Loeb (left) and Kristoffersson

=== Heats ===
Pos.	No.	Driver	Team	Car	Q1	Q2	Q3	Q4	Pts
1	11	(Norway) Petter Solberg	PSRX Volkswagen Sweden	Volkswagen Polo GTI	2nd	2nd	1st	2nd	16
2	1	(Sweden) Mattias Ekström	EKS RX	Audi S1	5th	6th	2nd	6th	15
3	3	(Sweden) Johan Kristoffersson	PSRX Volkswagen Sweden	Volkswagen Polo GTI	1st	1st	21st	12th	14
4	9	(France) Sébastien Loeb	Team Peugeot-Hansen	Peugeot 208	3rd	5th	19th	3rd	13
5	15	(Latvia) Reinis Nitišs	EKS RX	Audi S1	14th	8th	3rd	5th	12
6	6	(Latvia) Jānis Baumanis	STARD	Ford Fiesta	4th	11th	7th	8th	11
7	71	(Sweden) Kevin Hansen	Team Peugeot-Hansen	Peugeot 208	7th	7th	8th	10th	10
8	21	(Sweden) Timmy Hansen	Team Peugeot-Hansen	Peugeot 208	9th	13th	4th	9th	9
9	7	(Russia) Timur Timerzyanov	STARD	Ford Fiesta	11th	4th	5th	15th	8
10	13	(Norway) Andreas Bakkerud	Hoonigan Racing Division	Ford Focus RS	21st	20th	6th	1st	7
11	43	(United States) Ken Block	Hoonigan Racing Division	Ford Focus RS	17th	12th	9th	4th	6
12	57	(Finland) Toomas Heikkinen	EKS RX	Audi S1	8th	15th	13th	7th	5
13	68	(Finland) Niclas Grönholm	GRX	Ford Fiesta	13th	10th	10th	11th	4
14	96	(Sweden) Kevin Eriksson	MJP Racing Team Austria	Ford Fiesta	6th	3rd	22nd	14th	3
15	44	(Germany) Timo Scheider	MJP Racing Team Austria	Ford Fiesta	12th	9th	12th	13th	2
16	100	(United Kingdom) Guy Wilks	LOCO Energy World RX	Volkswagen Polo	10th	17th	11th	17th	1
17	87	(France) Jean-Baptiste Dubourg	DA Racing	Peugeot 208	15th	16th	15th	16th	
18	77	(Germany) René Münnich	All-Inkl.com Münnich Motorsport	SEAT Ibiza	18th	14th	14th	19th	
19	69	(Poland) Martin Kaczmarski	Martin Kaczmarski	Ford Fiesta	16th	19th	16th	18th	
20	10	(Hungary) "Csucsu"	Speedy Motorsport	Kia Rio	19th	18th	17th	20th	
21	66	(France) Grégoire Demoustier	DA Racing	Peugeot 208	20th	21st	18th	21st	
22	41	(Portugal) Joaquim Santos	Bompiso Racing Team	Ford Focus	22nd	22nd	20th	22nd	

=== Semi-finals ===
Semi-final 1

Pos.	No.	Driver	Team	Time	Pts
1	11	(Norway) Petter Solberg	PSRX Volkswagen Sweden	3:57.377	6
2	3	(Sweden) Johan Kristoffersson	PSRX Volkswagen Sweden	+1.438	5
3	15	(Latvia) Reinis Nitišs	EKS RX	+3.881	4
4	71	(Sweden) Kevin Hansen	Team Peugeot-Hansen	+5.631	3
5	43	(United States) Ken Block	Hoonigan Racing Division	+6.002	2
6	7	(Russia) Timur Timerzyanov	STARD	+7.189	1

Semi-final 2

Pos.	No.	Driver	Team	Time	Pts
1	1	(Sweden) Mattias Ekström	EKS RX	3:58.543	6
2	9	(France) Sébastien Loeb	Team Peugeot-Hansen	+0.739	5
3	21	(Sweden) Timmy Hansen	Team Peugeot-Hansen	+1.937	4
4	57	(Finland) Toomas Heikkinen	EKS RX	+4.787	3
5	6	(Latvia) Jānis Baumanis	STARD	+48.971	2
6	13	(Norway) Andreas Bakkerud	Hoonigan Racing Division	DNF	1

=== Final ===
Pos.	No.	Driver	Team	Time	Pts
1	1	(Sweden) Mattias Ekström	EKS RX	3:59.345	8
2	9	(France) Sébastien Loeb	Team Peugeot-Hansen	+0.567	5
3	3	(Sweden) Johan Kristoffersson	PSRX Volkswagen Sweden	+0.909	4
4	21	(Sweden) Timmy Hansen	Team Peugeot-Hansen	+1.729	3
5	15	(Latvia) Reinis Nitišs	EKS RX	+2.590	2
6	11	(Norway) Petter Solberg	PSRX Volkswagen Sweden	+31.143	1

== Standings after the event ==
Pos	Driver	Pts	Gap
1	(Sweden) Mattias Ekström	58	
2	(Sweden) Johan Kristoffersson	44	+14
3	(Norway) Petter Solberg	42	+16
4	(Norway) Andreas Bakkerud	30	+28
5	(Germany) Timo Scheider	28	+30

- Note: Only the top five positions are included.

Previous race: 2017 World RX of Barcelona	FIA World Rallycross Championship; 2017 season	Next race: 2017 World RX of Hockenheim
Previous race: 2016 World RX of Portugal	World RX of Portugal	Next race: Incumbent
