= Pista Automóvel de Montalegre =

- Rallycross Circuit (2007–2021)
- Location: Montalegre, Portugal
- Coordinates: 41°50′46″N 7°45′25″W
- Opened: 1999
- Major events: Former: FIA World Rallycross Championship; World RX of Portugal (2014–2018, 2021–2024); FIA European Rallycross Championship; Euro RX of Portugal (2007, 2009–2011, 2013–2018, 2021–2024); Titans-RX Europe (2019)

Rallycross Circuit (2022–present)
- Length: 1.146 km (0.712 mi)

Rallycross Circuit (2007–2021)
- Length: 0.945 km (0.587 mi)

Pista Automóvel de Montalegre is a motorsport race track situated in the municipality of Montalegre, in the Vila Real District of Portugal, close to the Spanish border. It primarily runs the Portuguese round of the European and World Rallycross championships, having hosted the latter from 2014 to 2018 and again since 2021. Before the 2022 World RX of Portugal, the layout was revised and lengthened.
