= Hyundai i20 WRC =

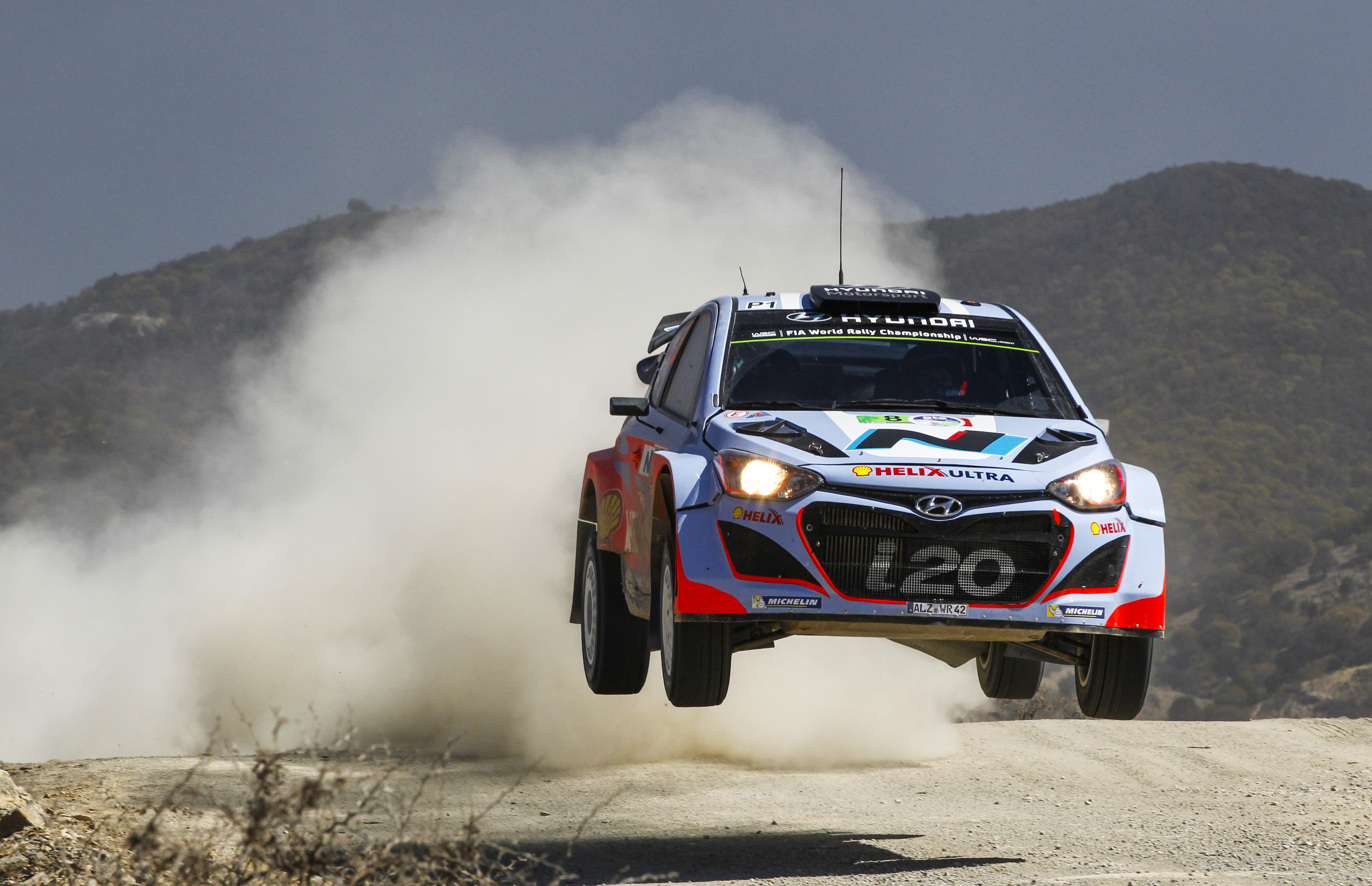
- Chris Atkinson and co-driver Stephane Prevot at the 2014 Rally Mexico
- Category: World Rally Car
- Constructor: Hyundai
- Designer: Bertrand Vallat
- Predecessor: Hyundai Accent WRC (Hyundai Castrol WRT)
- Successor: Hyundai i20 Coupe WRC

Technical specifications
- Engine: Hyundai T-GDI 1,591 cc (97 cu in) I4 turbocharged
- Fuel: Shell V-Power
- Lubricants: Shell Helix

Competition history (WRC)
- Notable entrants: (Germany) Hyundai Shell World Rally Team (Germany) Hyundai Motorsport N
- Notable drivers: (Australia) Chris Atkinson (France) Bryan Bouffier (Finland) Juho Hänninen (Belgium) Thierry Neuville (New Zealand) Hayden Paddon (Spain) Dani Sordo (Netherlands) Kevin Abbring
- Debut: (Monaco) 2014 Monte Carlo Rally
- First win: (Germany) 2014 Rallye Deutschland
- Last win: (Italy) 2016 Rally Italia Sardegna
| Races | Wins |
|---|---|
| 39 | 3 |

The Hyundai i20 WRC is a World Rally Car built by Hyundai for use from the 2014 World Rally Championship. It is based on the Hyundai i20 subcompact car, and was unveiled at the 2012 Paris Motor Show. The launch of the i20 marks Hyundai's return to the World Rally Championship after a ten-year absence. The car made its first competitive appearance at the 2014 Rallye Monte Carlo.

== Competition history ==
The cars are prepared by Hyundai's performance division, Hyundai Motorsport, from a base in Frankfurt, Germany, and were driven by Thierry Neuville, with Hayden Paddon and Dani Sordo in the 2nd and 3rd cars. A third i20 was entered in the Rally of Portugal for Sordo, In 2014 2011 Production Car World Rally Champion Hayden Paddon drove the third car in seven events during the second half of the season. Additional development work was carried out by Bryan Bouffier.

For 2015, Hyundai retained Thierry Neuville, Dani Sordo and Hayden Paddon. In addition, Dutchman Kevin Abbring was the main test driver for the new Hyundai i20 WRC.

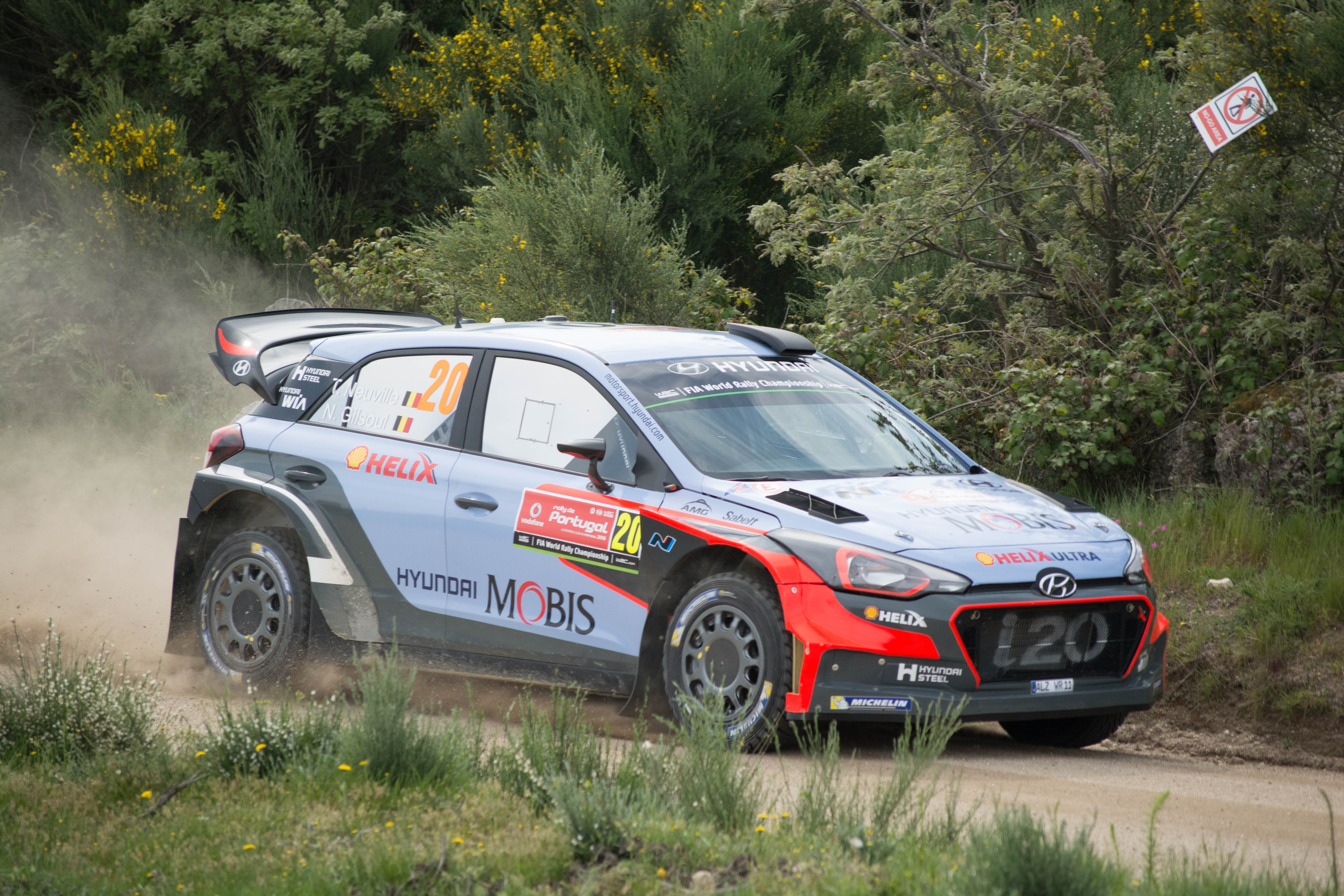
Neuville driving a 2016 spec Hyundai i20 WRC at Rally Portugal.

For 2016, Hyundai re-homologated the i20 to compete with the five-door version of the model. Neuville won at Italy and scored seven podiums, finishing runner-up behind Volkswagen driver Sébastien Ogier. Paddon also won in his debut in Argentina.

For the new regulation set in 2017 the car was replaced with the Hyundai i20 Coupe WRC.

== WRC victories ==
| Year | No. | Event | Surface | Driver | Co-driver |
|---|---|---|---|---|---|
| 2014 | 1 | (Germany) 2014 Rallye Deutschland | Tarmac | (Belgium) Thierry Neuville | (Belgium) Nicolas Gilsoul |
| 2016 | 2 | 2016 Rally Argentina | Gravel | (New Zealand) Hayden Paddon | (New Zealand) John Kennard |
| 2016 | 3 | (Italy) 2016 Rally Italia Sardegna | Gravel | (Belgium) Thierry Neuville | (Belgium) Nicolas Gilsoul |

== Complete World Rally Championship results ==
| Year | Entrant | Driver | Co-Driver | Rounds | | | | | | | | | | | | | Points | WCM pos. |
| Year | Entrant | Driver | Co-Driver | 1 | 2 | 3 | 4 | 5 | 6 | 7 | 8 | 9 | 10 | 11 | 12 | 13 | Points | WCM pos. |
|---|---|---|---|---|---|---|---|---|---|---|---|---|---|---|---|---|---|---|
| 2014 | (South Korea) Hyundai Shell World Rally Team | (Belgium) Thierry Neuville | (Belgium) Nicolas Gilsoul | MCO; Ret | SWE; 9 | MEX; 3 | PRT; 6 | ARG; 5 | ITA; 9 | POL; 3 | FIN; Ret | DEU; 1 | AUS; 7 | FRA; 8 | ESP; 6 | GBR; 4 | 187 | 4th |
| 2014 | (South Korea) Hyundai Shell World Rally Team | (Spain) Dani Sordo | (Spain) Marc Martí | MCO; Ret | SWE | MEX | PRT | ARG; Ret | ITA | POL | FIN | DEU; 2 | AUS | FRA; 4 | ESP; 5 | GBR | 187 | 4th |
| 2014 | (South Korea) Hyundai Shell World Rally Team | (Finland) Juho Hänninen | (Finland) Tomi Tuominen | MCO | SWE; 7 | MEX | PRT; 7 | ARG | ITA; Ret | POL; 6 | FIN; 6 | DEU | AUS | FRA | ESP | GBR; 30 | 187 | 4th |
| 2014 | (South Korea) Hyundai Shell World Rally Team | (Australia) Chris Atkinson | (Belgium) Stéphane Prévot | MCO | SWE | MEX; 7 | PRT | ARG | ITA | POL | FIN | DEU | AUS; 10 | FRA | ESP | GBR | 187 | 4th |
| 2014 | (South Korea) Hyundai Motorsport N | (Spain) Dani Sordo | (Spain) Marc Martí | MCO | SWE | MEX | PRT; Ret | ARG | ITA | POL | FIN | DEU | AUS | FRA | ESP | GBR | 28 | 7th |
| 2014 | (South Korea) Hyundai Motorsport N | (New Zealand) Hayden Paddon | (New Zealand) John Kennard | MCO | SWE | MEX | PRT | ARG | ITA; 12 | POL; 8 | FIN; 8 | DEU | AUS; 6 | FRA | ESP; 9 | GBR; 10 | 28 | 7th |
| 2014 | (South Korea) Hyundai Motorsport N | (France) Bryan Bouffier | (France) Xavier Panseri | MCO | SWE | MEX | PRT | ARG | ITA | POL | FIN | DEU; Ret | AUS | FRA; 9 | ESP | GBR | 28 | 7th |
| 2015 | (South Korea) Hyundai Shell World Rally Team | (Belgium) Thierry Neuville | (Belgium) Nicolas Gilsoul | MCO; 5 | SWE; 2 | MEX; 8 | ARG; Ret | PRT; 38 | ITA; 3 | POL; 6 | FIN; 4 | DEU; 5 | AUS; 7 | FRA; 23 | ESP; 8 | | 224 | 3rd |
| 2015 | (South Korea) Hyundai Shell World Rally Team | (Spain) Dani Sordo | (Spain) Marc Martí | MON; 6 | SWE; WD | MEX; 5 | ARG; 5 | POR; 6 | ITA; 20 | POL; 10 | FIN; 11 | DEU; 4 | | FRA; 7 | ESP; 3 | GBR; 4 | 224 | 3rd |
| 2015 | (South Korea) Hyundai Shell World Rally Team | (New Zealand) Hayden Paddon | (New Zealand) John Kennard | MON | SWE; 5 | | | | | | | | AUS; 5 | | | GBR; 5 | 224 | 3rd |
| 2015 | (South Korea) Hyundai Motorsport N | (Netherlands) Kevin Abbring | (United Kingdom) Sebastian Marshall | MON | SWE; 11 | MEX | ARG | POR | ITA | POL; 15 | FIN | DEU; 11 | AUS | FRA; Ret | ESP | GBR; Ret | 67 | 6th |
| 2015 | (South Korea) Hyundai Motorsport N | (New Zealand) Hayden Paddon | (New Zealand) John Kennard | | | MEX; 17 | ARG; 16 | POR; 8 | ITA; 2 | POL; 4 | FIN; Ret | GER; 9 | | FRA; 5 | ESP; 6 | | 67 | 6th |
| 2015 | (South Korea) Hyundai Motorsport N | (Spain) Dani Sordo | (Spain) Marc Martí | | | | | | | | | | AUS; 8 | | | | 67 | 6th |
| 2015 | (South Korea) Hyundai Motorsport N | (Belgium) Thierry Neuville | (Belgium) Nicolas Gilsoul | | | | | | | | | | | | | GBR; Ret | 67 | 6th |
| 2016 | (South Korea) Hyundai Motorsport (Hyundai New Generation i20 WRC) | (Belgium) Thierry Neuville | (Belgium) Nicolas Gilsoul | MON; 3 | SWE; 14 | MEX; Ret | ARG; 6 | | | POL; 4 | FIN; 4 | GER; 3 | FRA; 2 | ESP; 3 | GBR; 3 | AUS; 3 | 312 | 2nd |
| 2016 | (South Korea) Hyundai Motorsport (Hyundai New Generation i20 WRC) | (New Zealand) Hayden Paddon | (New Zealand) John Kennard | | SWE; 2 | | | POR; Ret | ITA; Ret | POL; 3 | FIN; 5 | | | | | AUS; 4 | 312 | 2nd |
| 2016 | (South Korea) Hyundai Motorsport (Hyundai New Generation i20 WRC) | (Spain) Dani Sordo | (Spain) Marc Martí | MON; 6 | | MEX; 4 | ARG; 4 | POR; 4 | ITA; 4 | | | GER; 2 | FRA; 7 | ESP; 2 | GBR; 6 | | 312 | 2nd |
| 2016 | (South Korea) Hyundai Motorsport N (Hyundai New Generation i20 WRC) | (New Zealand) Hayden Paddon | (New Zealand) John Kennard | MON; 25 | | MEX; 5 | ARG; 1 | | | | | GER; 5 | FRA; 6 | ESP; 4 | GBR; 4 | | 146 | 5th |
| 2016 | (South Korea) Hyundai Motorsport N (Hyundai New Generation i20 WRC) | (Netherlands) Kevin Abbring | (United Kingdom) Sebastian Marshall | MON | SWE | MEX | ARG | POR; Ret | ITA; 15 | POL | FIN; 9 | GER | FRA | ESP; 7 | GBR | AUS | 146 | 5th |
| 2016 | (South Korea) Hyundai Motorsport N (Hyundai New Generation i20 WRC) | (Spain) Dani Sordo | (Spain) Marc Martí | | SWE; 6 | | | | | POL; Ret | | | | | | AUS; 5 | 146 | 5th |
| 2016 | (South Korea) Hyundai Motorsport N (Hyundai New Generation i20 WRC) | (Belgium) Thierry Neuville | (Belgium) Nicolas Gilsoul | | | | | POR; 29 | ITA; 1 | | | | | | | | 146 | 5th |

== See also ==
- World Rally Car
  - Citroën DS3 WRC
  - Citroën C3 WRC
  - Ford Fiesta RS WRC
  - Mini John Cooper Works WRC
  - Toyota Yaris WRC
  - Volkswagen Polo R WRC
