= 2022 FIA European Rallycross Championship =

FIA European Rallycross Championship season

The 2022 FIA European Rallycross Championship was the 47th season of the FIA European Rallycross Championship. The championship consisted of two classes: RX1 and RX3.

The championship began on 21 May at the Nyirád Racing Center in Hungary, and ended on 14 November at Nürburgring in Germany.

== Calendar ==
The championship consisted of seven events across Europe, with RX1 competing at six rounds and RX3 competing at five.

The updated calendar was released on 21 March. It included one unconfirmed event.

Rnd	Event	Date	Venue	Class	Winner	Team
1	Euro RX of Hungary	21–22 May	Nyirád Racing Center, Nyirád	RX1	(Sweden) Anton Marklund	(Finland) SET Promotion
1	Euro RX of Hungary	21–22 May	Nyirád Racing Center, Nyirád	RX3	(Belgium) Kobe Pauwels	(Hungary) Volland Racing KFT
2	Euro RX of Sweden	2–3 July	Höljesbanan, Höljes	RX1	(Sweden) Anton Marklund	(Finland) SET Promotion
2	Euro RX of Sweden	2–3 July	Höljesbanan, Höljes	RX3	(Norway) Marius Solberg Hansen	(Norway) MSH RX
3	Euro RX of Norway	13–14 August	Lånkebanen, Hell	RX1	(Norway) Andreas Bakkerud	(Sweden) EKS
3	Euro RX of Norway	13–14 August	Lånkebanen, Hell	RX3	(Belgium) Kobe Pauwels	(Hungary) Volland Racing KFT
4	Euro RX of Latvia	3–4 September	Biķernieku Kompleksā Sporta Bāze, Riga	RX1	(Norway) Sondre Evjen	(Sweden) JC Raceteknik
5	Euro RX of Portugal	17–18 September	Pista Automóvel de Montalegre, Montalegre	RX1	(Belgium) Enzo Ide	(Sweden) EKS
5	Euro RX of Portugal	17–18 September	Pista Automóvel de Montalegre, Montalegre	RX3	(Belgium) Kobe Pauwels	(Hungary) Volland Racing KFT
6	(Belgium) Euro RX of Benelux	8–9 October	Circuit de Spa-Francorchamps, Stavelot	RX1	(Sweden) Anton Marklund	(Finland) SET Promotion
7	Euro RX of Germany	13–14 November	Nürburgring, Nürburg	RX3	(Belgium) Kobe Pauwels	(Hungary) Volland Racing KFT

== Entries ==
=== RX1 ===
Constructor	Team	Car	No.	Driver	Rounds	Ref
Audi	(Hungary) Kárai Motorsport Sportegyesület	Audi A1	39	(Hungary) Zoltán Koncseg	1	
Audi	(Sweden) EKS	Audi S1	13	(Norway) Andreas Bakkerud	2–3	
Audi	(Sweden) EKS	Audi S1	81	(Latvia) Ronalds Baldiņš	4	
Audi	(Sweden) EKS	Audi S1	91	(Belgium) Enzo Ide	All	
Audi	(Sweden) JC Raceteknik	Audi S1	52	(Norway) Ole Christian Veiby	2	
Audi	(Sweden) JC Raceteknik	Audi S1	69	(Norway) Sondre Evjen	2–4	
Audi	(Hungary) Kárai Motorsport Sportegyesület	Audi S1	73	(Hungary) Tamás Kárai	All	
Citroën	(Portugal) Mário Barbosa	Citroën DS3	75	(Portugal) Mário Barbosa	5	
Citroën	(France) Hervé Knapick	Citroën DS3	84	(France) Hervé Knapick	1, 5–6	
Ford	(Republic of Ireland) Patrick O'Donovan	Ford Fiesta	4	(Republic of Ireland) Patrick O'Donovan	1	
Ford	(Finland) Betomik Racing Team	Ford Fiesta	5	(Finland) Mika Liimatainen	6	
Ford	(Norway) David Nordgaard	Ford Fiesta	9	(Norway) David Nordgaard	3	
Ford	(Sweden) Team Skåab	Ford Fiesta	31	(Sweden) Stefan Kristensson	2, 6	
Ford	(Denmark) Linnemann Promotion	Ford Fiesta	33	(Denmark) Ulrik Linnemann	All	
Ford	(Poland) Oponeo	Ford Fiesta	44	(Poland) Dariusz Topolewski	1–3, 5–6	
Ford	(Poland) Oponeo	Ford Fiesta	88	(Poland) Marcin Gagacki	All	
Ford	(Hungary) Nyirád Motorsport KFT	Ford Fiesta	50	(Hungary) Attila Mózer	1–5	
Ford	(Lithuania) TSK Baltijos Sportas	Ford Fiesta	55	(Lithuania) Paulius Pleskovas	2, 4, 6	
Ford	(Norway) Frank Valle	Ford Fiesta	67	(Norway) Frank Valle	2–3, 6	
Hyundai	(Finland) Betomik Racing Team	Hyundai i20	10	(Finland) Mikko Ikonen	4, 6	
Hyundai	(Finland) Betomik Racing Team	Hyundai i20	18	(Finland) Juha Rytkönen	6	
Hyundai	(Finland) Betomik Racing Team	Hyundai i20	35	(Jamaica) Fraser McConnell	3	
Hyundai	(Sweden) Hedströms Motorsport	Hyundai i20	14	(Sweden) Oliver Solberg	2	
Hyundai	(Finland) SET Promotion	Hyundai i20	92	(Sweden) Anton Marklund	All	
Peugeot	(Sweden) #YellowSquad	Peugeot 208	6	(Latvia) Janis Baumanis	All	
Peugeot	(Hungary) Speedbox Racing Team KFT	Peugeot 208	27	(Hungary) László Kiss	1	
Peugeot	(Hungary) Nyirád Motorsport KFT	Peugeot 208	51	(Hungary) Márk Mózer	1	
Peugeot	(France) Jean Baptiste Dubourg	Peugeot 208	87	(France) Jean Baptiste Dubourg	1–2	
Peugeot	(Portugal) José Oliveira	Peugeot 208	110	(Portugal) José Oliveira	5	
Proton	(Republic of Ireland) Oliver O'Donovan	Proton Iriz	2	(Republic of Ireland) Oliver O'Donovan	1–2	
SEAT	(Germany) ALL-INKL.COM Münnich Motorsport	SEAT Ibiza	38	(Germany) Mandie August	All	
SEAT	(Germany) ALL-INKL.COM Münnich Motorsport	SEAT Ibiza	77	(Germany) René Münnich	1	
Volkswagen	(Sweden) Kristoffersson Motorsport	Volkswagen Polo	3	(Sweden) Johan Kristoffersson	2	
Volkswagen	(Sweden) Kristoffersson Motorsport	Volkswagen Polo	26	(Sweden) Gustav Bergström	2	
Volkswagen	(Sweden) Hedströms Motorsport	Volkswagen Polo	8	(Sweden) Peter Hedström	6	
Volkswagen	(Czech Republic) KRTZ Motorsport ACCR Czech Team	Volkswagen Polo	11	(Czech Republic) Aleš Fučik	1	
Volkswagen	(Sweden) Carexperience AB	Volkswagen Polo	12	(Sweden) Anders Michalak	1–3	
Volkswagen	(Sweden) Dan Öberg	Volkswagen Polo	17	(Sweden) Dan Öberg	2	
Volkswagen	(Sweden) Linus Östlund	Volkswagen Polo	21	(Sweden) Linus Östlund	2–3	
Volkswagen	(Norway) Sivert Svardal	Volkswagen Polo	24	(Norway) Sivert Svardal	All	
Volkswagen	(Norway) Tom André Saetnan	Volkswagen Scirocco	30	(Norway) Tom André Saetnan	2–3, 6	

=== RX3 ===
Constructor	Team	Car	No.	Driver	Rounds	Ref
Audi	(Hungary) Volland Racing KFT	Audi A1	2	(Lithuania) Rytis Rutkauskas	5	
Audi	(Hungary) Volland Racing KFT	Audi A1	22	(Belgium) Kobe Pauwels	All	
Audi	(Hungary) Volland Racing KFT	Audi A1	30	(Germany) Nils Volland	2–5	
Audi	(Hungary) Volland Racing KFT	Audi A1	88	(Portugal) Nuno Miguel da Costa Araújo	All	
Audi	(Poland) Damian Litwinowicz	Audi A1	6	(Poland) Damian Litwinowicz	All	
Audi	(Norway) Per Magne Egebø-Svardal	Audi A1	13	(Norway) Per Magne Egebø-Svardal	1–3, 5	
Audi	(Norway) Anders Hansen	Audi A1	14	(Norway) Anders Hansen	2	
Audi	(Hungary) Speedy Motorsport	Audi A1	18	(Hungary) Zsolt Szíjj 'Jolly'	1	
Audi	(Portugal) João Ribeiro	Audi A1	99	(Portugal) João Ribeiro	All	
Audi	(Hungary) Zalaegerszegi Autósport Egyesület	Audi A1	112	(Hungary) Róbert Répási	1	
Citroën	(Portugal) Jorge Machado	Citroën C2	103	(Portugal) Jorge Machado	4	
Ford	(Hungary) TMC Rallysport KFT	Ford Fiesta	4	(Hungary) András Ferjáncz	1	
Ford	(Norway) Martin Kjær	Ford Fiesta	33	(Norway) Martin Kjær	2, 5	
Ford	(Portugal) Rogério Sousa	Ford Fiesta	105	(Portugal) Rogério Sousa	4	
Ford	(Belgium) OTRT	Ford Ka	7	(Belgium) Nick Snoeys	2	
Peugeot	(Norway) Espen Isaksætre	Peugeot 208	8	(Norway) Espen Isaksætre	2–3, 5	
Peugeot	(Portugal) Tiago Ferreira	Peugeot 208	121	(Portugal) Tiago Ferreira	4	
Peugeot	(Portugal) António Sousa	Peugeot 208	129	(Portugal) António Sousa	4	
Peugeot	(Portugal) Joaquim Machado	Peugeot 208	146	(Portugal) Joaquim Machado	4	
Renault	(Portugal) Sérgio Dias	Renault Twingo	149	(Portugal) Sérgio Dias	4	
Škoda	(Czech Republic) PAJR S.R.O.	Škoda Citigo	11	(Czech Republic) Jan Černý	All	
Škoda	(Estonia) Ligur Racing	Škoda Fabia	10	(Estonia) Janno Ligur	2	
Škoda	(Norway) Jens Hvaal	Škoda Fabia	12	(Norway) Jens Hvaal	5	
Škoda	(Norway) MSH RX	Škoda Fabia	60	(Norway) Marius Solberg Hansen	2–3	
Škoda	(Czech Republic) Jiři Šusta	Škoda Fabia	61	(Czech Republic) Jiři Šusta	1–3	
Škoda	(Germany) ADAC Weser-EMS E.V.	Škoda Fabia	86	(Germany) Lukas Ney	5	
Škoda	(Portugal) Leonel Sampaio	Škoda Fabia	147	(Portugal) Leonel Sampaio	4	
Škoda	(Norway) Guttorm Lindefjell	Škoda Fabia	169	(Norway) Guttorm Lindefjell	2	
Volkswagen	(Czech Republic) KRTZ Motorsport	Volkswagen Polo	58	(Austria) Dominik Senegacnik	1–4	

== Championship standings ==
Points are scored as follows:

Position	1st	2nd	3rd	4th	5th	6th	7th	8th	9th	10th	11th	12th	13th	14th	15th
Points	20	16	13	12	11	10	9	8	7	6	5	4	3	2	1

=== RX1 Driver's Championship ===
Pos.	Driver	HUN (Hungary)	SWE (Sweden)	NOR (Norway)	LVA (Latvia)	POR (Portugal)	BLX (Belgium)	Points
1	(Sweden) Anton Marklund	1	1	4	2	4	1	100
2	(Latvia) Janis Baumanis	4	6	3	9	2	3	71
3	(Belgium) Enzo Ide	2	13	13	3	1	11	60
4	(Norway) Sivert Svardal	5	10	9	5	6	4	57
5	(Hungary) Tamás Karai	8	14	6	6	7	5	50
6	(Norway) Sondre Evjen		7	2 (Note: Sondre Evjen was penalized 5 championship points.)	1			40
7	(Denmark) Ulrik Linnemann	3	20	18	10	3	12	36
8	(Norway) Andreas Bakkerud		3	1				33
9	(Poland) Marcin Gagacki	11	12	14	8	5	15	31
10	(Germany) Mandie August	9	16	16	11	12	7	25
11	(Sweden) Anders Michalak	7	9	10				22
12	(Finland) Mikko Ikonen				4		9	19
13	(France) Jean Baptiste Dubourg	14	2					18
14	(Finland) Juha Rytkönen						2	16
15	(Hungary) Attila Mózer	18	22	7	13	13		15
16	(Sweden) Johan Kristoffersson		4					12
17	(Sweden) Oliver Solberg		5					11
18	(Jamaica) Fraser McConnell			5				11
19	(Czech Republic) Aleš Fučik	6						10
20	(Sweden) Peter Hedström						6	10
21	(Sweden) Linus Östlund		11	11				10
22	(Latvia) Ronalds Baldiņš				7			9
23	(Sweden) Stefan Kristensson		24				8	8
24	(Portugal) Mário Barbosa					8		8
25	(Norway) Ole Christian Veiby		8					8
26	(Norway) Frank Valle		21	8				8
27	(Portugal) José Oliveira					9		7
28	(Poland) Dariusz Topolewski	20	23	15		10		7
29	(France) Hervé Knapick	17				11	14	6
30	(Finland) Mika Liimatainen						10	6
31	(Republic of Ireland) Patrick O'Donovan	10						6
32	(Norway) David Nordgaard			12				4
33	(Hungary) Márk Mózer	12						4
34	(Hungary) László Kiss	13						3
35	(Republic of Ireland) Oliver O'Donovan	15	15					2
36	(Hungary) Zoltán Koncseg	16						0
37	(Norway) Tom André Saetnan		19	17				0
38	(Sweden) Gustav Bergström		18					0
39	(Germany) René Münnich	19						0
40	(Sweden) Dan Öberg		25					0
41	(Lithuania) Paulius Pleskovas		17		12		13 (Note: Paulius Pleskovas was penalized 15 championship points.)	-8
Pos.	Driver	HUN (Hungary)	SWE (Sweden)	NOR (Norway)	LVA (Latvia)	POR (Portugal)	BLX (Belgium)	Points

Colour	Result
Gold	Winner
Silver	Second place
Bronze	Third place
Green	Points finish
Blue	Non-points finish
Blue	Non-classified finish (NC)
Purple	Retired (Ret)
Red	Did not qualify (DNQ)
Red	Did not pre-qualify (DNPQ)
Black	Disqualified (DSQ)
White	Did not start (DNS)
White	Withdrew (WD)
White	Race cancelled (C)
Blank	Did not practice (DNP)
Blank	Did not arrive (DNA)
Blank	Excluded (EX)

=== RX3 Driver's Championship ===
Pos.	Driver	HUN (Hungary)	SWE (Sweden)	NOR (Norway)	POR (Portugal)	GER (Germany)	Points
1	(Belgium) Kobe Pauwels	1	2	1	1	1	96
2	(Poland) Damian Litwinowicz	4	5	3	2	3	65
3	(Czech Republic) Jan Černý	2	14	4	4	5	53
4	(Portugal) João Ribeiro	3	3	6	5	11	52
5	(Portugal) Nuno Miguel da Costa Araújo	7	11	9	3	6	44
6	(Germany) Nils Volland		10	2	6	7	41
7	(Austria) Dominik Senegacnik	8	7	10	9		30
8	(Norway) Marius Solberg Hansen		1	7			29
9	(Norway) Espen Isaksætre		6	5		10	27
10	(Czech Republic) Jiři Šusta	9	8	8			23
11	(Norway) Jens Hvaal					2	16
12	(Norway) Martin Kjær		13			4	15
13	(Norway) Per Magne Egebø-Svardal	5	12	11 (Note: Per Magne Egebø-Svardal was penalized 15 championship points.)		8	13
14	(Estonia) Janno Ligur		4				12
15	(Hungary) Zsolt Szíjj 'Jolly'	6					10
16	(Portugal) Jorge Machado				7		9
17	(Portugal) Joaquim Machado				8		8
18	(Belgium) Nick Snoeys		9				7
19	(Lithuania) Rytis Rutkauskas					9	7
20	(Portugal) António Sousa				10		6
21	(Hungary) Róbert Répási	10					6
22	(Portugal) Sérgio Dias				11		5
23	(Hungary) András Ferjáncz	11					5
24	(Portugal) Rogério Sousa				12		4
25	(Germany) Lukas Ney					12	4
26	(Portugal) Tiago Ferreira				13		3
27	(Portugal) Leonel Sampaio				14		2
28	(Norway) Anders Hansen		15				1
29	(Norway) Guttorm Lindefjell		16				0
Pos.	Driver	HUN (Hungary)	SWE (Sweden)	NOR (Norway)	POR (Portugal)	GER (Germany)	Points
