= 2024 FIA European Rallycross Championship =

The 2024 FIA European Rallycross Championship was the 49th season of the FIA European Rallycross Championship. The championship consisted of three classes: RX1, RX2e and RX3.

The championship began on 6 July at the Höljesbanan in Sweden, and ended on 8 September at Pista Automóvel de Montalegre in Portugal. Patrick O'Donovan won his first RX1 title. Nils Andersson won his second consecutive RX2e title. Nils Volland won his first RX3 title.

== Calendar ==
On 28 February 2024, the 2024 calendar was announced. The championship was slated to return to the Circuit d'Essay for the first time since 2011, but the event was cancelled on the 30th of May 2024.

| Rnd | Event | Date | Venue | Class | Winner | Team |
|---|---|---|---|---|---|---|
| - | Euro RX of France | 8–9 June | Circuit d'Essay, Essay | RX1 | Cancelled | |
| - | Euro RX of France | 8–9 June | Circuit d'Essay, Essay | RX2e | Cancelled | |
| - | Euro RX of France | 8–9 June | Circuit d'Essay, Essay | RX3 | Cancelled | |
| 1 | Euro RX of Sweden | 6–7 July | Höljesbanan, Höljes | RX1 | (United Kingdom) Patrick O'Donovan | (United Kingdom) Team RX Racing |
| 1 | Euro RX of Sweden | 6–7 July | Höljesbanan, Höljes | RX2e | (Sweden) Nils Andersson | (Sweden) Team E |
| 1 | Euro RX of Sweden | 6–7 July | Höljesbanan, Höljes | RX3 | (Germany) Nils Volland | (Poland) Volland Racing |
| 2 | Euro RX of Hungary | 27–28 July | Nyirád Racing Center, Nyirád | RX1 | (United Kingdom) Patrick O'Donovan | (United Kingdom) Team RX Racing |
| 2 | Euro RX of Hungary | 27–28 July | Nyirád Racing Center, Nyirád | RX2e | (Sweden) Nils Andersson | (Sweden) Team E |
| 2 | Euro RX of Hungary | 27–28 July | Nyirád Racing Center, Nyirád | RX3 | (Germany) Nils Volland (Note: João Ribeiro finished first, but was later penalized one position for pushing and passing. Nils Volland inherited the win.) | (Poland) Volland Racing |
| 3 | (Belgium) Euro RX of Benelux | 17–18 August | Circuit Jules Tacheny Mettet, Mettet | RX1 | (United Kingdom) Patrick O'Donovan | (United Kingdom) Team RX Racing |
| 3 | (Belgium) Euro RX of Benelux | 17–18 August | Circuit Jules Tacheny Mettet, Mettet | RX2e | (Belgium) Kobe Pauwels | (Belgium) Kobe Pauwels |
| 3 | (Belgium) Euro RX of Benelux | 17–18 August | Circuit Jules Tacheny Mettet, Mettet | RX3 | (Portugal) João Ribeiro | (Portugal) João Ribeiro |
| 4 | Euro RX of Portugal | 7–8 September | Pista Automóvel de Montalegre, Montalegre | RX1 | (Switzerland) Yury Belevskiy | (Poland) Volland Racing |
| 4 | Euro RX of Portugal | 7–8 September | Pista Automóvel de Montalegre, Montalegre | RX2e | (Sweden) Nils Andersson | (Sweden) Team E |
| 4 | Euro RX of Portugal | 7–8 September | Pista Automóvel de Montalegre, Montalegre | RX3 | (Portugal) João Ribeiro | (Portugal) João Ribeiro |

== Series News ==
- On the 30th of May 2024, the series promoter RXP put out a statement that the opening round of the season at Circuit d'Essay had been unexpectedly withdrawn from the calendar upon request by France's national motorsport governing agency, the FFSA. The event was subsequently cancelled, and the series was set to start at the World RX of Sweden at Höljes. The circuit also put out a statement, echoing the statement made by RXP.

== Entries ==
=== RX1 ===
| Constructor | Team | Car | No. | Driver | Rounds | Ref |
|---|---|---|---|---|---|---|
| Audi | (Hungary) Kárai Motorsport Sportegyesület | Audi S1 | 39 | (Hungary) Zoltán Koncseg | All | |
| Audi | (Hungary) Kárai Motorsport Sportegyesület | Audi S1 | 73 | (Hungary) Tamás Kárai | All | |
| Audi | (Poland) Volland Racing | Audi S1 | 66 | (Poland) Damian Litwinowicz | All | |
| Audi | (Poland) Volland Racing | Audi S1 | 95 | (Switzerland) Yury Belevskiy | All | |
| Audi | (Hungary) Extremarena KFT | Audi S1 | 85 | (Hungary) István Antal | 2 | |
| Ford | (Hungary) Nyirád Motorsport KFT | Ford Fiesta | 50 | (Hungary) Attila Mózer | All | |
| Ford | (Hungary) Nyirád Motorsport KFT | Ford Fiesta | 51 | (Hungary) Mark Mózer | All | |
| Ford | (Portugal) Cesar Pereira | Ford Fiesta | 88 | (Portugal) Cesar Pereira | 4 | |
| Hyundai | (Finland) Betomik Racing | Hyundai i20 | 10 | (Finland) Mikko Ikonen | All | |
| Hyundai | (Finland) Betomik Racing | Hyundai i20 | 37 | (Finland) Mika Liimatainen | All | |
| Peugeot | (United Kingdom) Team RX Racing | Peugeot 208 | 2 | (Republic of Ireland) Oliver O'Donovan | 3–4 | |
| Peugeot | (United Kingdom) Team RX Racing | Peugeot 208 | 7 | (United Kingdom) Patrick O'Donovan | All | |
| Peugeot | (Sweden) Hedströms Motorsport | Peugeot 208 | 8 | (Sweden) Peter Hedström | 1 | |
| Peugeot | (France) DA Racing | Peugeot 208 | 16 | (France) Julien Fébreau | 4 | |
| Peugeot | (Hungary) Korda Racing KFT | Peugeot 208 | 22 | (Hungary) Máté Benyó | All | |
| Peugeot | (Hungary) Speedbox Racing Team KFT | Peugeot 208 | 27 | (Hungary) László Kiss | 2–3 | |
| Peugeot | (Portugal) José Oliveira | Peugeot 208 | 110 | (Portugal) José Oliveira | 4 | |
| Proton | (United Kingdom) Team RX Racing | Proton Iriz | 2 | (Republic of Ireland) Oliver O'Donovan | 1–2 | |
| Renault | (France) Pascal Lambec | Renault Clio | 19 | (France) Pascal Lambec | 4 | |
| SEAT | (Germany) ALL-INKL.COM Münnich Motorsport | SEAT Ibiza | 38 | (Germany) Mandie August | All | |
| Škoda | (Lithuania) TSK Baltijos Sportas | Škoda Fabia | 55 | (Lithuania) Paulius Pleskovas | All | |
| Škoda | (Hungary) Kárai Motorsport Sportegyesület | Škoda Fabia | 74 | (Hungary) Zoltán Held | 2 | |
| Volkswagen | (Czech Republic) KRTZ Motorsport ACCR Czech Team | Volkswagen Polo | 11 | (Czech Republic) Aleš Fučík | All | |
| Volkswagen | (Norway) Sivert Svardal | Volkswagen Polo | 24 | (Norway) Sivert Svardal | 1 | |
| Volkswagen | (Sweden) Hedströms Motorsport | Volkswagen Polo | 28 | (Sweden) Filip Thorén | 1 | |
| Volkswagen | (Denmark) Linnemann Promotion | Volkswagen Polo | 33 | (Denmark) Ulrik Linnemann | 1 | |

=== RX2e ===
| Constructor | Team | Car | No. | Driver | Rounds | Ref |
|---|---|---|---|---|---|---|
| QEV Technologies | (Hungary) GFS Motorsport Egyesület | ZEROID X1 | 00 | (Hungary) 'Luigi' | 1–2, 4 | |
| QEV Technologies | (Sweden) Team E | ZEROID X1 | 1 | (Sweden) Nils Andersson | All | |
| QEV Technologies | (Sweden) Team E | ZEROID X1 | 19 | (Sweden) Mikaela Åhlin-Kottulinsky | All | |
| QEV Technologies | (Sweden) #YELLOWSQUAD | ZEROID X1 | 5 | (Australia) Molly Taylor | 1, 4 | |
| QEV Technologies | (Sweden) #YELLOWSQUAD | ZEROID X1 | 82 | (Sweden) Isak Sjökvist | All | |
| QEV Technologies | (Portugal) Gustavo Henriques | ZEROID X1 | 8 | (Portugal) Gustavo Henriques | 4 | |
| QEV Technologies | (Belgium) Kobe Pauwels | ZEROID X1 | 22 | (Belgium) Kobe Pauwels | 3 | |
| QEV Technologies | (Finland) SET-Loenbro | ZEROID X1 | 27 | (Estonia) Marko Muru | All | |
| QEV Technologies | (Portugal) Sergio Dias | ZEROID X1 | 149 | (Portugal) Sergio Dias | 4 | |
| QEV Technologies | (Spain) ZEROID Motorsport | ZEROID X1 | 911 | (Germany) Luka Wlömer | All | |

=== RX3 ===
| Constructor | Team | Car | No. | Driver | Rounds | Ref |
|---|---|---|---|---|---|---|
| Audi | (Poland) Volland Racing | Audi A1 | 2 | (Lithuania) Rytis Rutkauskas | All | |
| Audi | (Poland) Volland Racing | Audi A1 | 23 | (Hungary) Krisztián Szabó | 2 | |
| Audi | (Poland) Volland Racing | Audi A1 | 26 | (Antigua and Barbuda) Nicolas Geleyns | All | |
| Audi | (Poland) Volland Racing | Audi A1 | 30 | (Germany) Nils Volland | All | |
| Audi | (Norway) Anders Hansen | Audi A1 | 4 | (Norway) Anders Hansen | 3 | |
| Audi | (Hungary) TMC Rallysport KFT | Audi A1 | 13 | (Hungary) András Ferjáncz | 2 | |
| Audi | (Czech Republic) Libor Teješ | Audi A1 | 14 | (Czech Republic) Libor Teješ | 2–3 | |
| Audi | (Portugal) João Ribeiro | Audi A1 | 99 | (Portugal) João Ribeiro | All | |
| Audi | (Portugal) André Sousa | Audi A1 | 104 | (Portugal) André Sousa | All | |
| Audi | (Portugal) Joaquim Machado | Audi A1 | 146 | (Portugal) Joaquim Machado | 4 | |
| Citroën | (Portugal) André Monteiro | Citroën C3 | 69 | (Portugal) André Monteiro | 4 | |
| Ford | (Portugal) Rogério Sousa | Ford Fiesta | 105 | (Portugal) Rogério Sousa | 4 | |
| Peugeot | (France) Jimmy Terpereau | Peugeot 208 | 37 | (France) Jimmy Terpereau | 4 | |
| Peugeot | (Portugal) Jorge Machado | Peugeot 208 | 101 | (Portugal) Jorge Machado | 4 | |
| Peugeot | (Portugal) Tiago Ferreira | Peugeot 208 | 121 | (Portugal) Tiago Ferreira | 4 | |
| Peugeot | (Portugal) António Sousa | Peugeot 208 | 129 | (Portugal) António Sousa | 4 | |
| Renault | (France) Dylan Dufas | Renault Clio | 9 | (France) Dylan Dufas | 4 | |
| Škoda | (Hungary) Korda Racing KFT | Škoda Fabia | 7 | (Hungary) Sámuel Kovács | All | |
| Škoda | (Czech Republic) KRTZ Motorsport | Škoda Fabia | 28 | (Austria) Josef Strebinger | 1–2 | |
| Škoda | (Czech Republic) KRTZ Motorsport | Škoda Fabia | 58 | (Austria) Dominik Senegacnik | All | |
| Škoda | (Portugal) Leonel Sampaio | Škoda Fabia | 147 | (Portugal) Leonel Sampaio | 4 | |
| Suzuki | (Hungary) Speedy Motorsport | Suzuki Swift | 22 | (Hungary) Andor Trepák | 2 | |
| Volkswagen | (Hungary) MGAMS KFT | Volkswagen Polo | 45 | (Hungary) Tamás Végh | 2 | |
| Volkswagen | (Hungary) Szada Ring Racing KFT | Volkswagen Polo | 131 | (Hungary) Balázs Körmöczi | All | |

== Championship standings ==
Points are scored based on finishing positions in every heat race, semi-final and final. Points are scored as follows:

| Position | 1st | 2nd | 3rd | 4th | 5th | 6th |
|---|---|---|---|---|---|---|
| Heat race points | 5 | 4 | 3 | 2 | 1 | 0 |
| Finals points | 10 | 8 | 6 | 4 | 2 | 1 |

=== RX1 Driver's Championship ===
| Pos. | Driver | SWE (Sweden) | HUN (Hungary) | BLX (Belgium) | PRT (Portugal) | Points |
|---|---|---|---|---|---|---|
| 1 | (United Kingdom) Patrick O'Donovan | 1 | 1 | 1 | 3 | 147 |
| 2 | (Switzerland) Yury Belevskiy | 5 | 2 | 2 | 1 | 135 |
| 3 | (Hungary) Máté Benyó | 7 | 3 | 3 | 2 | 106 |
| 4 | (Poland) Damian Litwinowicz | 3 | 8 | 4 | 4 | 104 |
| 5 | (Finland) Mika Liimatainen | 2 | 4 | 9 | 6 | 98 |
| 6 | (Hungary) Zoltán Koncseg | 4 | 7 | 10 | 7 | 72 |
| 7 | (Hungary) Tamás Kárai | 13 | 6 | 13 | 5 | 65 |
| 8 | (Hungary) Mark Mózer | 14 | 10 | 5 | 12 | 59 |
| 9 | (Lithuania) Paulius Pleskovas | 9 | 15 | 8 | 9 | 59 |
| 10 | (Finland) Mikko Ikonen | 12 (Note: Mikko Ikonen was penalized 5 championship points due to receiving two reprimands across the season.) | 5 | 11 | 11 | 58 |
| 11 | (Republic of Ireland) Oliver O'Donovan | 8 | 9 | 7 | 15 | 57 |
| 12 | (Hungary) Attila Mózer | 16 | 14 | 15 | 10 | 41 |
| 13 | (Hungary) László Kiss | | 13 | 6 | | 31 |
| 14 | (Czech Republic) Aleš Fučík | 18 | 11 | 12 | | 28 |
| 15 | (Germany) Mandie August | 15 | 16 | 14 | 17 | 23 |
| 16 | (Sweden) Peter Hedström | 6 | | | | 22 |
| 17 | (France) Julien Fébreau | | | | 8 | 18 |
| 18 | (Norway) Sivert Svardal | 11 | | | | 17 |
| 19 | (Sweden) Filip Thorén | 10 | | | | 13 |
| 20 | (Hungary) István Antal | | 12 | | | 13 |
| 21 | (Portugal) José Oliveira | | | | 13 | 9 |
| 22 | (France) Pascal Lambec | | | | 14 | 8 |
| 23 | (Denmark) Ulrik Linnemann | 17 | | | | 8 |
| 24 | (Portugal) Cesar Pereira | | | | 16 | 5 |
| 25 | (Hungary) Zoltán Held | | 17 | | | 2 |
| Pos. | Driver | SWE (Sweden) | HUN (Hungary) | BLX (Belgium) | PRT (Portugal) | Points |

| Colour | Result |
|---|---|
| Gold | Winner |
| Silver | Second place |
| Bronze | Third place |
| Green | Points classification |
| Blue | Non-points classification |
| Blue | Non-classified finish (NC) |
| Purple | Retired, not classified (Ret) |
| Red | Did not qualify (DNQ) |
| Red | Did not pre-qualify (DNPQ) |
| Black | Disqualified (DSQ) |
| White | Did not start (DNS) |
| White | Withdrew (WD) |
| White | Race cancelled (C) |
| Blank | Did not practice (DNP) |
| Blank | Did not arrive (DNA) |
| Blank | Excluded (EX) |

=== RX2e Driver's Championship ===
| Pos. | Driver | SWE (Sweden) | HUN (Hungary) | BLX (Belgium) | PRT (Portugal) | Points |
|---|---|---|---|---|---|---|
| 1 | (Sweden) Nils Andersson | 1 | 1 | 5 | 1 | 126 |
| 2 | (Sweden) Isak Sjökvist | 6 | 2 | 2 | 2 | 110 |
| 3 | (Estonia) Marko Muru | 3 | 3 | 4 (Note: Marko Muru was penalized 5 championship points due to receiving two reprimands across the season.) | 4 | 92 |
| 4 | (Sweden) Mikaela Åhlin-Kottulinsky | 2 | 4 | 6 (Note: Mikaela Åhlin-Kottulinsky was penalized 5 championship points due to receiving two reprimands across the season.) | 6 | 84 |
| 5 | (Germany) Luka Wlömer | 5 | 5 | 3 | 3 | 82 |
| 6 | (Australia) Molly Taylor | 4 | | | 5 | 41 |
| 7 | (Hungary) 'Luigi' | 7 | 6 | | | 30 |
| 8 | (Belgium) Kobe Pauwels | | | 1 | | 29 |
| 9 | (Portugal) Gustavo Henriques | | | | 7 | 18 |
| 10 | (Portugal) Sergio Dias | | | | 8 | 11 |
| Pos. | Driver | SWE (Sweden) | HUN (Hungary) | BLX (Belgium) | PRT (Portugal) | Points |

| Colour | Result |
|---|---|
| Gold | Winner |
| Silver | Second place |
| Bronze | Third place |
| Green | Points classification |
| Blue | Non-points classification |
| Blue | Non-classified finish (NC) |
| Purple | Retired, not classified (Ret) |
| Red | Did not qualify (DNQ) |
| Red | Did not pre-qualify (DNPQ) |
| Black | Disqualified (DSQ) |
| White | Did not start (DNS) |
| White | Withdrew (WD) |
| White | Race cancelled (C) |
| Blank | Did not practice (DNP) |
| Blank | Did not arrive (DNA) |
| Blank | Excluded (EX) |

=== RX3 Driver's Championship ===
| Pos. | Driver | SWE (Sweden) | HUN (Hungary) | BLX (Belgium) | PRT (Portugal) | Points |
|---|---|---|---|---|---|---|
| 1 | (Germany) Nils Volland | 1 | 1 | 3 | 2 | 147 |
| 2 | (Portugal) João Ribeiro | 2 | 2 | 1 | 1 | 142 |
| 3 | (Austria) Dominik Senegacnik | 4 | 7 | 2 | 6 | 93 |
| 4 | (Portugal) André Sousa | 5 | 4 | 5 | 5 | 88 |
| 5 | (Hungary) Balázs Körmöczi | 6 | 6 | 7 | 3 | 82 |
| 6 | (Hungary) Sámuel Kovács | 3 | 12 | 10 | 8 | 60 |
| 7 | (Antigua and Barbuda) Nicolas Geleyns | 8 | 5 | 4 | 12 | 58 |
| 8 | (Lithuania) Rytis Rutkauskas | 7 | 13 | 9 (Note: Rytis Rutkauskas was penalized 5 championship points due to receiving two reprimands across the season.) | 11 | 39 |
| 9 | (Czech Republic) Libor Teješ | | 8 | 6 | | 34 |
| 10 | (Hungary) Krisztián Szabó | | 3 | | | 30 |
| 11 | (Austria) Josef Strebinger | 9 | 10 | | | 25 |
| 12 | (Portugal) Joaquim Machado | | | | 7 | 22 |
| 13 | (Portugal) Rogério Sousa | | | | 4 | 19 |
| 14 | (Hungary) Andor Trepák | | 9 | | | 14 |
| 15 | (Norway) Anders Hansen | | | 8 | | 12 |
| 16 | (Portugal) Tiago Ferreira | | | | 13 | 12 |
| 17 | (Portugal) Jorge Machado | | | | 10 | 10 |
| 18 | (Hungary) András Ferjáncz | | 11 | | | 10 |
| 19 | (Portugal) António Sousa | | | | 14 | 6 |
| 20 | (Hungary) Tamás Végh | | 14 | | | 6 |
| 21 | (Portugal) Leonel Sampaio | | | | 9 (Note: Leonel Sampaio was penalized 5 championship points due to receiving two reprimands across the season.) | 5 |
| 22 | (France) Dylan Dufas | | | | 15 | 1 |
| Pos. | Driver | SWE (Sweden) | HUN (Hungary) | BLX (Belgium) | PRT (Portugal) | Points |

| Colour | Result |
|---|---|
| Gold | Winner |
| Silver | Second place |
| Bronze | Third place |
| Green | Points classification |
| Blue | Non-points classification |
| Blue | Non-classified finish (NC) |
| Purple | Retired, not classified (Ret) |
| Red | Did not qualify (DNQ) |
| Red | Did not pre-qualify (DNPQ) |
| Black | Disqualified (DSQ) |
| White | Did not start (DNS) |
| White | Withdrew (WD) |
| White | Race cancelled (C) |
| Blank | Did not practice (DNP) |
| Blank | Did not arrive (DNA) |
| Blank | Excluded (EX) |
