= 2021 World RX of Sweden =

Rallycross event

- Round 2 of 9 in the 2021 FIA World Rallycross Championship
- Date: 21-22 August 2021
- Location: Värmland, Sweden
- Venue: Höljesbanan

Results
Heat winners
- Heat 1: (Sweden) Johan Kristoffersson; KYB EKS JC
- Heat 2: (Sweden) Timmy Hansen; Hansen World RX Team
- Heat 3: (Netherlands) Kevin Abbring; Unkorrupted
- Heat 4: (Sweden) Johan Kristoffersson; KYB EKS JC
Semi-final winners
- Semi-final 1: (Sweden) Timmy Hansen; Hansen World RX Team
- Semi-final 2: (Sweden) Kevin Hansen; Hansen World RX Team
Final
- First: (Sweden) Timmy Hansen; Hansen World RX Team
- Second: (Sweden) Kevin Hansen; Hansen World RX Team
- Third: (Netherlands) Kevin Abbring; Unkorrupted

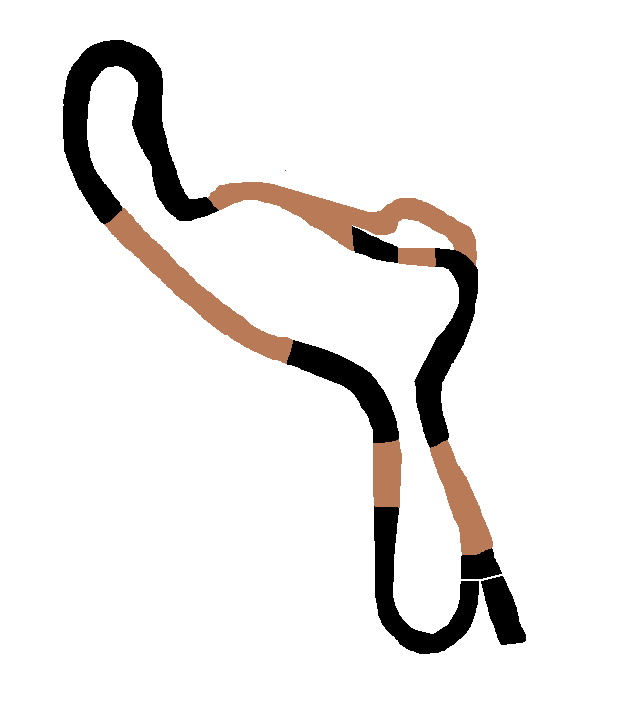
Rallycross layout of the Höljesbanan

The 2021 World RX of Sweden was the second round of the eighth season of the FIA World Rallycross Championship. The event was held at the Höljesbanan in Värmland, Sweden. The first round of the RX1 class, and the second round of the RX3 class in the 2021 FIA European Rallycross Championship were also held at the event.

== Heats ==
=== World RX1 Championship ===
World RX1 Championship classification
Pos.	No.	Driver	Team	Car	Q1	Q2	Q3	Q4	QP	CP
1	21	(Sweden) Timmy Hansen	Hansen World RX Team	Peugeot 208	45	50	45	45	185	16
2	1	(Sweden) Johan Kristoffersson	KYB EKS JC	Audi S1	50	45	38	50	183	15
3	69	(Netherlands) Kevin Abbring	Unkorrupted	Renault Mégane RS	36	37	50	42	165	14
4	23	(Hungary) Krisztián Szabó	GRX-SET World RX Team	Hyundai i20	38	42	40	40	160	13
5	68	(Finland) Niclas Grönholm	GRX-SET World RX Team	Hyundai i20	42	40	37	34	153	12
6	9	(Sweden) Kevin Hansen	Hansen World RX Team	Peugeot 208	40	35	39	39	153	11
7	18	(Finland) Juha Rytkönen	Juha Rytkönen	Ford Fiesta	33	38	42	38	151	10
8	91	(Belgium) Enzo Ide	KYB EKS JC	Audi S1	37	39	36	37	149	9
9	8	(Sweden) Peter Hedström	Hedströms Motorsport	Hyundai i20	39	36	35	36	146	8
10	50	(Hungary) Attila Mózer	Nyirád Motorsport KFT	Ford Fiesta	35	34	34	35	138	7

=== RX2e Championship ===
World RX2e Championship classification
Pos.	No.	Driver	Team	Car	Q1	Q2	Q3	Q4	QP	CP
1	35	(Sweden) Fraser McConnell	Olsbergs MSE	OMSE QEV RX2e	50	50	45	45	190	16
2	47	(Finland) Jesse Kallio	Olsbergs MSE	OMSE QEV RX2e	42	37	50	50	179	15
3	14	(Sweden) Nils Andersson	Kristoffersson Motorsport	OMSE QEV RX2e	38	45	39	42	164	14
5	96	(Belgium) Guillaume De Ridder	Guillaume De Ridder	OMSE QEV RX2e	45	40	37	35	157	13
4	18	(Sweden) Linus Östlund	Linus Östlund	OMSE QEV RX2e	40	42	42	33	157	12
6	170	(Sweden) Isak Reiersen	EKS JC	OMSE QEV RX2e	39	35	38	40	152	11
7	13	(United Kingdom) Patrick O'Donovan	Patrick O'Donovan	OMSE QEV RX2e	36	39	40	36	151	10
8	82	(Sweden) Isak Sjökvist	Isak Sjökvist	OMSE QEV RX2e	37	38	36	39	150	9
9	21	(France) Damien Meunier	Damien Meunier	OMSE QEV RX2e	35	36	35	38	144	8
10	5	(Spain) Pablo Suárez	Ruben Fernandez Gil	OMSE QEV RX2e	34	34	34	37	139	7

=== European RX1 Championship ===
European RX1 Championship classification
Pos.	No.	Driver	Team	Car	Q1	Q2	Q3	Q4	QP	CP
1	16	(Norway) Thomas Bryntesson	Thomas Bryntesson	Volkswagen Polo	42	40	38	50	170	16
2	92	(Sweden) Anton Marklund	Hedströms Motorsport	Volkswagen Polo	50	50	50	19	169	15
3	87	(France) Jean-Baptiste Dubourg	Jean Baptiste Dubourg	Peugeot 208	39	39	45	45	168	14
4	20	(France) Fabien Pailler	Fabien Pailler	Peugeot 208	45	45	42	32	164	13
5	23	(France) Ándrea Dubourg	Ándrea Dubourg	Peugeot 208	40	37	40	39	156	12
6	77	(Germany) René Münnich	ALL-INKL.COM Münnich Motorsport	Seat Ibiza	37	35	35	38	145	11
7	13	(Norway) Andreas Bakkerud	GFS Motorsport Egyesület / ES K&N	Škoda Fabia	38	42	21	42	143	10
8	18	(France) Jonathan Pailler	Jonathan Pailler	Peugeot 208	33	36	34	40	143	9
9	9	(Norway) David Nordgaard	David Nordgaard	Volkswagen Polo	34	34	36	34	138	8
10	73	(Hungary) Tamás Kárai	Kárai Motorsport Sportegyesület	Audi S1	32	33	31	37	133	7
11	12	(Sweden) Anders Michalak	Hedströms Motorsport	Volkswagen Polo	35	38	37	19	129	6
12	85	(Norway) Hans-Jøran Østreng	Hans-Jøran Østreng	Hyundai i20	31	31	32	30	124	5
13	7	(Hungary) Csucsu	Csucsu	Renault Clio	36	32	19	36	123	4
14	38	(Germany) Mandie August	ALL-INKL.COM Münnich Motorsport	Seat Ibiza	29	28	33	31	121	3
15	76	(France) Romuald Delaunay	Romuald Delaunay	Citroën DS3	27	29	29	33	118	2
16	11	(Czech Republic) Aleš Fučik	KRTZ Motorsport ACCR Czech Team	Volkswagen Polo	28	27	30	28	113	1
17	24	(Norway) Sivert Svardal	Sivert Svardal	Volkswagen Polo R	19	19	39	35	112	0
18	88	(Poland) Marcin Gagacki	Oponeo	Ford Fiesta	30	26	26	25	107	0
19	44	(Poland) Dariusz Topolewski	Oponeo	Ford Fiesta	26	25	27	27	105	0
20	6	(Latvia) Janis Baumanis	ES Motorsport	Škoda Fabia	19	30	24	29	102	0
21	83	(France) Patrick Guillerme	Patrick Guillerme	Hyundai i20	25	24	25	26	100	0
22	75	(Sweden) Per Eklund	Eklund Motorsport	Volkswagen Beetle	24	23	23	24	94	0
23	19	(France) Pascal Lambec	Pascal Lambec	Peugeot 208	19	22	22	19	82	0
24	55	(Lithuania) Paulius Pleskovas	TSK Baltijos Sportas	Ford Fiesta	23	0 (Note: Paulius Pleskovas was disqualified from Q2 after having been determined to not have respected double waved yellow signals following the retirement of Sivert Svardal.)	28	19	70	0

=== European RX3 Championship ===
European RX3 Championship classification
Pos.	No.	Driver	Team	Car	Q1	Q2	Q3	Q4	QP	CP
1	95	(Switzerland) Yury Belevskiy	Volland Racing KFT.	Audi A1	50	50	50	50	200	16
2	11	(Czech Republic) Jan Černý	Pajrs S.R.O.	Škoda Citigo	38	45	35	45	163	15
3	10	(Estonia) Janno Ligur	Ligur Racing	Škoda Fabia	45	42	39	36	162	14
4	54	(Russia) Marat Knyazev	Volland Racing KFT.	Audi A1	42	38	40	42	162	13
5	89	(Russia) Timur Shigabutdinov	Volland Racing KFT.	Audi A1	33	40	38	40	151	12
6	8	(Norway) Espen Isaksætre	Espen Isaksætre	Peugeot 208	37	39	36	37	149	11
7	22	(Belgium) Kobe Pauwels	Volland Racing KFT.	Audi A1	40	37	45	22	144	10
8	14	(Lithuania) Kasparas Navickas	Kreda	Škoda Fabia	34	33	33	39	139	9
9	60	(Norway) Marius Solberg Hansen	Alexander Hvaal	Škoda Fabia	39	24	42	33	138	8
10	6	(Poland) Damian Litwinowicz	Damian Litwinowicz	Audi A1	35	36	37	29	137	7
11	5	(Norway) Sebastian Høidalen	Sebastian Høidalen	Ford Fiesta	30	35	32	34	131	6
12	91	(Norway) Martin Kjær	Martin Kjær	Ford Fiesta	28	32	34	35	129	5
13	61	(Czech Republic) Jiři Šusta	Josef Šusta	Škoda Fabia	32	31	31	31	125	4
14	23	(Poland) Radosław Raczkowski	Automax Motorsport	Škoda Fabia	22	34	29	38	123	3
15	9	(France) Dylan Dufas	Dylan Dufas	Renault Twingo	31	30	27	32	120	2
16	58	(Czech Republic) Dominik Senegacnik	KRTZ Motorsport	Volkswagen Polo	36	29	24	22	111	1
17	18	(Hungary) Zsolt Szíjj Jolly	Speedy Motorsport	Audi A1	27	27	26	30	110	0
18	66	(France) Jérémy Lambec	Jérémy Lambec	Škoda Fabia	29	28	28	22	107	0
19	98	(Czech Republic) Marcel Suchý	JihoČesky Autoklub V AČR	Škoda Fabia	26	26	25	28	105	0
20	86	(Germany) Lukas Ney	ADAC Team Weser-Ems E.V.	Škoda Fabia	24	23	23	27	97	0
21	13	(Norway) Per Magne Egebø-Svardal	Per Magne Egebø-Svardal	Audi A1	25	25	30	0 (Note: Per Magne Egebø-Svardal did not start Q4.)	80	0

== Semi-finals ==
=== World RX1 Championship ===
==== Semi-Final 1 ====
Pos.	No.	Driver	Team	Time	Pts
1	21	(Sweden) Timmy Hansen	Hansen World RX Team	4:28.822	6
2	69	(Netherlands) Kevin Abbring	Unkorrupted	+ 3.197	5
3	18	(Finland) Juha Rytkönen	Juha Rytkönen	+ 5.331	4
4	8	(Sweden) Peter Hedström	Hedströms Motorsport	+ 6.815	3
5	68	(Finland) Niclas Grönholm	GRX-SET World RX Team	+ 7.443 (Note: Niclas Grönholm was given a five-second penalty for cutting a corner.)	2

==== Semi-Final 2 ====
Pos.	No.	Driver	Team	Time	Pts
1	9	(Sweden) Kevin Hansen	Hansen World RX Team	4:27.773	6
2	23	(Hungary) Krisztián Szabó	GRX-SET World RX Team	+ 1.510	5
3	91	(Belgium) Enzo Ide	KYB EKS JC	+ 6.644	4
4	50	(Hungary) Attila Mózer	Nyirád Motorsport KFT	+ 15.839	3
5	1	(Sweden) Johan Kristoffersson	KYB EKS JC	+ 3 Laps	2

=== RX2e Championship ===
==== Semi-Final 1 ====
Pos.	No.	Driver	Team	Time	Pts
1	35	(Sweden) Fraser McConnell	Olsbergs MSE	4:38.638	6
2	18	(Sweden) Linus Östlund	Linus Östlund	+ 0.666	5
3	13	(United Kingdom) Patrick O'Donovan	Patrick O'Donovan	+ 1.274	4
4	21	(France) Damien Meunier	Damien Meunier	+ 3.297	3
5	14	(Sweden) Nils Andersson	Kristoffersson Motorsport	+ 5 Laps	2

==== Semi-Final 2 ====
Pos.	No.	Driver	Team	Time	Pts
1	47	(Finland) Jesse Kallio	Olsbergs MSE	4:36.549	6
2	96	(Belgium) Guillaume De Ridder	Guillaume De Ridder	+ 2.083	5
3	82	(Sweden) Isak Sjökvist	Isak Sjökvist	+ 5.569	4
4	5	(Spain) Pablo Suárez	Ruben Fernandez Gil	+ 10.047	3
5	170	(Sweden) Isak Reiersen	EKS JC	+ 11.533	2

=== European RX1 Championship ===
==== Semi-Final 1 ====
Pos.	No.	Driver	Team	Time	Pts
1	16	(Norway) Thomas Bryntesson	Thomas Bryntesson	4:27.212	6
2	87	(France) Jean-Baptiste Dubourg	Jean Baptiste Dubourg	+ 1.629	5
3	13	(Norway) Andreas Bakkerud	GFS Motorsport Egyesület / ES K&N	+ 7.831	4
4	23	(France) Ándrea Dubourg	Ándrea Dubourg	+ 7.458 (Note: Ándrea Dubourg was given a 1-position penalty for pushing Andreas Bakkerud.)	3
5	12	(Sweden) Anders Michalak	Hedströms Motorsport	+ 8.537	2
6	9	(Norway) David Nordgaard	David Nordgaard	+ 6 Laps	1

==== Semi-Final 2 ====
Pos.	No.	Driver	Team	Time	Pts
1	18	(France) Jonathan Pailler	Jonathan Pailler	4:33.952	6
2	7	(Hungary) Csucsu (Note: Anton Marklund did not take the start in the semi-final due to crash damage sustained in Q4. Csucsu was promoted to take his spot.)	Csucsu	+ 3.620	5
3	73	(Hungary) Tamás Kárai	Kárai Motorsport Sportegyesület	+ 9.770	4
4	77	(Germany) René Münnich	ALL-INKL.COM Münnich Motorsport	+ 21.608	3
5	20	(France) Fabien Pailler	Fabien Pailler	+ 2 Laps	2
6	85	(Norway) Hans-Jøran Østreng	Hans-Jøran Østreng	+ 3 Laps	1

=== European RX3 Championship ===
==== Semi-Final 1 ====
Pos.	No.	Driver	Team	Time	Pts
1	95	(Switzerland) Yury Belevskiy	Volland Racing KFT.	4:44.677	6
2	10	(Estonia) Janno Ligur	Ligur Racing	+ 3.982	5
3	22	(Belgium) Kobe Pauwels	Volland Racing KFT.	+ 5.416	4
4	60	(Norway) Marius Solberg Hansen	Alexander Hvaal	+ 5.804	3
5	89	(Russia) Timur Shigabutdinov	Volland Racing KFT.	+ 10.146 (Note: Timur Shigabutdinov was given a five-second penalty for cutting a corner.)	2
6	5	(Norway) Sebastian Høidalen	Sebastian Høidalen	+ 10.220	1

==== Semi-Final 2 ====
Pos.	No.	Driver	Team	Time	Pts
1	54	(Russia) Marat Knyazev	Volland Racing KFT.	4:47.674	6
2	11	(Czech Republic) Jan Černý	Pajrs S.R.O.	+ 3.114	5
3	6	(Poland) Damian Litwinowicz	Damian Litwinowicz	+ 4.541	4
4	14	(Lithuania) Kasparas Navickas	Kreda	+ 7.905	3
5	8	(Norway) Espen Isaksætre	Espen Isaksætre	+ 1 Lap	2
6	91	(Norway) Martin Kjær	Martin Kjær	+ 1 Lap	1

== Finals ==
=== World RX1 Championship ===
Pos.	No.	Driver	Team	Time	Pts
1	21	(Sweden) Timmy Hansen	Hansen World RX Team	4:26.709	8
2	9	(Sweden) Kevin Hansen	Hansen World RX Team	+ 1.049	5
3	69	(Netherlands) Kevin Abbring	Unkorrupted	+ 1.645	4
4	91	(Belgium) Enzo Ide	KYB EKS JC	+ 3.154	3
5	23	(Hungary) Krisztián Szabó	GRX-SET World RX Team	+ 3.696	2
6	18	(Finland) Juha Rytkönen	Juha Rytkönen	+ 4.636	1

=== RX2e Championship ===
Pos.	No.	Driver	Team	Time	Pts
1	47	(Finland) Jesse Kallio	Jesse Kallio	4:39.714	8
2	35	(Sweden) Fraser McConnell	Fraser McConnell	+ 1.605	5
3	82	(Sweden) Isak Sjökvist	Isak Sjökvist	+ 4.472	4
4	96	(Belgium) Guillaume De Ridder	Guillaume De Ridder	+ 7.210	3
5	18	(Sweden) Linus Östlund	Linus Östlund	+ 7.594	2
6	13	(United Kingdom) Patrick O'Donovan	Patrick O'Donovan	+ 10.552	1

=== European RX1 Championship ===
Pos.	No.	Driver	Team	Time	Pts
1	16	(Norway) Thomas Bryntesson	Thomas Bryntesson	4:27.212	8
2	87	(France) Jean-Baptiste Dubourg	Jean Baptiste Dubourg	+ 0.575	5
3	13	(Norway) Andreas Bakkerud	GFS Motorsport Egyesület / ES K&N	+ 1.088	4
4	73	(Hungary) Tamás Kárai	Kárai Motorsport Sportegyesület	+ 5.946	3
5	18	(France) Jonathan Pailler	Jonathan Pailler	+ 2 Laps	2
6	7	(Hungary) Csucsu	Csucsu	+ 5.919 (Note: Csucsu was given a 2-position penalty for pushing Jonathan Pailler.)	1

=== European RX3 Championship ===
Pos.	No.	Driver	Team	Time	Pts
1	95	(Switzerland) Yury Belevskiy	Volland Racing KFT.	4:43.685	8
2	22	(Belgium) Kobe Pauwels	Volland Racing KFT.	+ 0.533	5
3	54	(Russia) Marat Knyazev	Volland Racing KFT.	+ 1.460	4
4	11	(Czech Republic) Jan Černý	Pajrs S.R.O.	+ 3.629	3
5	10	(Estonia) Janno Ligur	Ligur Racing	+ 4.129	2
6	6	(Poland) Damian Litwinowicz	Damian Litwinowicz	+ 4.641	1

== Standings after the event ==
=== World RX1 Championship ===
	Pos	Driver	Pts
1	1	(Sweden) Timmy Hansen	57
1	2	(Sweden) Kevin Hansen	51
1	3	(Hungary) Krisztián Szabó	40
3	4	(Netherlands) Kevin Abbring	37
2	5	(Sweden) Johan Kristoffersson	37

=== RX2e Championship ===
	Pos	Driver	Pts
	1	(Belgium) Guillaume De Ridder	51
3	2	(Finland) Jesse Kallio	50
1	3	(Sweden) Fraser McConnell	49
2	4	(United Kingdom) Patrick O'Donovan	34
1	5	(Spain) Pablo Suárez	31

=== European RX1 Championship ===
Pos	Driver	Pts
1	(Norway) Thomas Bryntesson	30
2	(France) Jean-Baptiste Dubourg	24
3	(Norway) Andreas Bakkerud	18
4	(France) Jonathan Pailler	17
5	(Sweden) Anton Marklund	15

=== European RX3 Championship ===
	Pos	Driver	Pts
	1	(Switzerland) Yury Belevskiy	60
	2	(Belgium) Kobe Pauwels	43
2	3	(Russia) Marat Knyazev	41
3	4	(Czech Republic) Jan Černý	38
2	5	(Russia) Timur Shigabutdinov	36

- Note: Only the top five positions are included.

== Notes ==
Previous race: 2021 World RX of Barcelona-Catalunya	FIA World Rallycross Championship; 2021 season	Next race: 2021 World RX of France
Previous race: 2020 World RX of Sweden	World RX of Sweden	Next race: -
