= 2021 FIA European Rallycross Championship =

FIA European Rallycross Championship season

The 2021 FIA European Rallycross Championship was the 46th season of the FIA European Rallycross Championship. The championship consisted of two classes: RX1 and RX3.
The championship began on 22 May at the Circuit de Spa-Francorchamps in Belgium, and ended on 4 September at Circuit de Lohéac in France.

== Calendar ==
The championship consisted of 6 events across Europe, with RX1 competing at four rounds and RX3 competing at five.
The initial calendar was released on 16 December. It included one unconfirmed event. A revised calendar was released on 26 March. Another calendar revision was published on 12 May.

Rnd	Event	Date	Venue	Class	Winner	Team
1	(Spain) Euro RX of Barcelona - Catalunya	23–24 July	Circuit de Barcelona-Catalunya, Montmeló	RX3	(Switzerland) Yury Belevskiy	(Hungary) Volland Racing KFT
2	Euro RX of Sweden	20–22 August	Höljesbanan, Höljes	RX1	(Norway) Thomas Bryntesson	(Norway) Thomas Bryntesson
2	Euro RX of Sweden	20–22 August	Höljesbanan, Höljes	RX3	(Switzerland) Yury Belevskiy	(Hungary) Volland Racing KFT
3	Euro RX of France	3–5 September	Circuit de Lohéac, Lohéac	RX1	(Germany) René Münnich	(Germany) ALL-INKL.COM Münnich Motorsport
3	Euro RX of France	3–5 September	Circuit de Lohéac, Lohéac	RX3	(Belgium) Kobe Pauwels	(Hungary) Volland Racing KFT
4	Euro RX of Latvia	18–19 September	Biķernieku Kompleksā Sporta Bāze, Riga	RX1	(Latvia) Janis Baumanis	(Lithuania) ES Motorsport
5	(Belgium) Euro RX of Benelux	8–10 October	Circuit de Spa-Francorchamps, Spa-Francorchamps	RX1	(Norway) Andreas Bakkerud	(Lithuania) ES Motorsport
5	(Belgium) Euro RX of Benelux	8–10 October	Circuit de Spa-Francorchamps, Spa-Francorchamps	RX3	(Switzerland) Yury Belevskiy	(Hungary) Volland Racing KFT
6	Euro RX of Portugal	16–17 October	Pista Automóvel de Montalegre, Montalegre	RX3	(Switzerland) Yury Belevskiy	(Hungary) Volland Racing KFT

=== Calendar Changes ===
- After being cancelled due to the COVID-19 pandemic, the Euro RX of Benelux, Euro RX of Norway and Euro RX of France were all set to return to the championship on the initial calendar. The Euro RX of Norway was not included in the 12 May revision of the calendar.
- The Euro RX of Finland was set to return to the championship for the first time since 2014 on the initial calendar, but was not included in the 12 May revision.
- After being on the calendar in 2020, the Euro RX of Riga - Latvia was not included in the initial calendar, but was later added to the calendar in the May 12 revision.
- After being on the original 2020 calendar, then being cancelled by the COVID-19 pandemic, the Euro RX of Portugal, Euro RX of Russia and Euro RX of Germany were not included in the initial calendar. The Euro RX of Portugal and the Euro RX of Germany were reintroduced on the revised calendar.

== Series News ==
- The Supercar and Super1600 classes were renamed to RX1 and RX3 respectively.

== Entries ==
=== RX1 ===
Constructor	Team	Car	No.	Driver	Rounds	Ref
Audi	(Hungary) Kárai Motorsport Sportgyesület	Audi S1	73	(Hungary) Tamás Kárai	All	
Citroën	(France) Ydeo Competition	Citroën DS3	35	(France) Benoît Fretin	2	
Citroën	(France) Stéphane De Ganay	Citroën DS3	47	(France) Stéphane De Ganay	2,4	
Citroën	(France) David Meslier	Citroën DS3	68	(France) David Meslier	2	
Citroën	(France) Romuald Delauney	Citroën DS3	76	(France) Romuald Delauney	1-2	
Ford	(Poland) Oponeo	Ford Fiesta	44	(Poland) Dariusz Topolewski	All	
Ford	(Poland) Oponeo	Ford Fiesta	88	(Poland) Marcin Gagacki	All	
Ford	(Hungary) Nyírad Motorsport KFT	Ford Fiesta	50	(Hungary) Attila Mózer	2-4	
Ford	(Lithuania) TSK Baltijos Sportas	Ford Fiesta	55	(Lithuania) Paulius Pleskovas	All	
Hyundai	(Sweden) Hedströms Motorsport	Hyundai i20	8	(Sweden) Peter Hedström	3	
Hyundai	(France) Patrick Guillerme	Hyundai i20	83	(France) Patrick Guillerme	1-2, 4	
Hyundai	(Norway) Hans-Jøran Østreng	Hyundai i20	85	(Norway) Hans-Jøran Østreng	All	
Peugeot	(France) Jonathan Pailler	Peugeot 208	18	(France) Jonathan Pailler	All	
Peugeot	(France) Fabien Pailler	Peugeot 208	20	(France) Fabien Pailler	All	
Peugeot	(France) Pascal Lambec	Peugeot 208	19	(France) Pascal Lambec	1-2	
Peugeot	(France) Ándrea Dubourg	Peugeot 208	23	(France) Ándrea Dubourg	All	
Peugeot	(France) Jean-Baptiste Dubourg	Peugeot 208	87	(France) Jean-Baptiste Dubourg	1-2	
Peugeot	(France) Emmanuel Anne	Peugeot 208	29	(France) Emmanuel Anne	2	
Peugeot	(France) Laurent Bouliou	Peugeot 208	95	(France) Laurent Bouliou	2	
Peugeot	(France) Anthony Pelfrene	Peugeot 208	112	(France) Anthony Pelfrene	2	
Renault	(Hungary) CsuCsu	Renault Clio	7	(Hungary) Csucsu	All	
SEAT	(Germany) ALL-INKL.COM Münnich Motorsport	SEAT Ibiza	38	(Germany) Mandie August	All	
SEAT	(Germany) ALL-INKL.COM Münnich Motorsport	SEAT Ibiza	77	(Germany) René Münnich	1-2, 4	
Škoda	(Lithuania) ES Motorsport	Škoda Fabia	6	(Latvia) Janis Baumanis	All	
Škoda	(Lithuania) ES Motorsport	Škoda Fabia	13	(Norway) Andreas Bakkerud	2-4	
Škoda	(Hungary) GFS Motorsport Egyesület / ES K&N	Škoda Fabia	13	(Norway) Andreas Bakkerud	1	
Škoda	(Latvia) Edijs Ošs	Škoda Fabia	80	(Latvia) Edijs Ošs	3	
Volkswagen	(Sweden) Eklund Motorsport	Volkswagen Beetle	75	(Sweden) Per Eklund	1	
Volkswagen	(Norway) David Nordgaard	Volkswagen Polo	9	(Norway) David Nordgaard	1	
Volkswagen	(Czech Republic) KRTZ Motorsport ACCR Czech Team	Volkswagen Polo	11	(Czech Republic) Aleš Fučik	1, 3	
Volkswagen	(Sweden) Hedströms Motorsport	Volkswagen Polo	12	(Sweden) Anders Michalak	1, 3-4	
Volkswagen	(Sweden) Hedströms Motorsport	Volkswagen Polo	92	(Sweden) Anton Marklund	1	
Volkswagen	(Norway) Thomas Bryntesson	Volkswagen Polo	16	(Norway) Thomas Bryntesson	1, 3	
Volkswagen	(Norway) Sivert Svardal	Volkswagen Polo	24	(Norway) Sivert Svardal	All	

=== RX3 ===
Constructor	Team	Car	No.	Driver	Rounds	Ref
Audi	(Poland) Damian Litwinowicz	Audi A1	6	(Poland) Damian Litwinowicz	All	
Audi	(Norway) Per Magne Egebø-Svardal	Audi A1	13	(Norway) Per Magne Egebø-Svardal	2, 4	
Audi	(Hungary) Volland Racing KFT.	Audi A1	22	(Belgium) Kobe Pauwels	All	
Audi	(Hungary) Volland Racing KFT.	Audi A1	54	(Russia) Marat Knyazev	All	
Audi	(Hungary) Volland Racing KFT.	Audi A1	89	(Russia) Timur Shigabutdinov	1-3, 5	
Audi	(Hungary) Volland Racing KFT.	Audi A1	95	(Switzerland) Yury Belevskiy	All	
Audi	(Hungary) Speedy Motorsport	Audi A1	18	(Hungary) Zsolt Szíjj Jolly	1-3	
Audi	(Portugal) Nuno Araújo	Audi A1	108	(Portugal) Nuno Araújo	5	
Citroën	(France) Maximilien Eveno	Citroën C2	75	(France) Maximilien Eveno	3	
Citroën	(Portugal) Hélder Ribeiro	Citroën C2	122	(Portugal) Hélder Ribeiro	5	
Ford	(Norway) Sebastian Høidalen	Ford Fiesta	5	(Norway) Sebastian Høidalen	2	
Ford	(Norway) Martin Kjær	Ford Fiesta	91	(Norway) Martin Kjær	2	
Peugeot	(Portugal) Pedro Ribeiro	Peugeot 108	44	(Portugal) Pedro Ribeiro	3, 5	
Peugeot	(Norway) Espen Isaksætre	Peugeot 208	8	(Norway) Espen Isaksætre	2	
Peugeot	(Portugal) Antonio Sousa	Peugeot 208	129	(Portugal) Antonio Sousa	5	
Peugeot	(Portugal) Joaquim Machado	Peugeot 208	146	(Portugal) Joaquim Machado	5	
Renault	(France) Dylan Dufas	Renault Twingo	9	(France) Dylan Dufas	2-3	
Renault	(Estonia) RS Racing Team	Renault Twingo	20	(Estonia) Siim Saluri	1	
Renault	(France) Meunier Competition	Renault Twingo	28	(Belgium) Clément Picard	3-4	
Renault	(France) Meunier Competition	Renault Twingo	161	(France) Frédéric Moreau	3	
Renault	(Portugal) Sergio Dias	Renault Twingo	125	(Portugal) Sergio Dias	5	
Škoda	(Czech Republic) Pajrs S.R.O.	Škoda Citigo	11	(Czech Republic) Jan Černý	All	
Škoda	(Estonia) Ligur Racing	Škoda Fabia	10	(Estonia) Janno Ligur	2-3	
Škoda	(Lithuania) Kreda	Škoda Fabia	14	(Lithuania) Kasparas Navickas	1-2	
Škoda	(Poland) Automax Motorsport	Škoda Fabia	23	(Poland) Radosław Raczkowski	1–4	
Škoda	(Norway) Alexander Hvaal	Škoda Fabia	60	(Norway) Marius Solberg Hansen	2	
Škoda	(Czech Republic) Josef Šusta	Škoda Fabia	61	(Czech Republic) Jiři Šusta	1–4	
Škoda	(France) Jérémy Lambec	Škoda Fabia	66	(France) Jérémy Lambec	2-3	
Škoda	(France) Maximilien Eveno	Škoda Fabia	75	(France) Maximilien Eveno	3	
Škoda	(Germany) ADAC Team Weser-Ems E.V.	Škoda Fabia	86	(Germany) Lukas Ney	1-3	
Škoda	(Czech Republic) JihoČesky Autoklub V AČR	Škoda Fabia	96	(Czech Republic) Marcel Suchý	1–2, 4	
Škoda	(Portugal) João Ribeiro	Škoda Fabia	99	(Portugal) João Ribeiro	5	
Škoda	(Portugal) Leonel Sampaio	Škoda Fabia	147	(Portugal) Leonel Sampaio	5	
Volkswagen	(Czech Republic) KRTZ Motorsport	Volkswagen Polo	58	(Czech Republic) Dominik Senegacnik	2	

== Championship standings ==
Points are scored as follows:

	Position															
Round	1st	2nd	3rd	4th	5th	6th	7th	8th	9th	10th	11th	12th	13th	14th	15th	16th
Heats	16	15	14	13	12	11	10	9	8	7	6	5	4	3	2	1
Semi-Finals	6	5	4	3	2	1										
Final	8	5	4	3	2	1										

=== RX1 ===
Pos.	Driver	SWE (Sweden)	FRA (France)	LAT (Latvia)	BEL (Belgium)	Points
1	(Norway) Andreas Bakkerud	3	4	7	1	90
2	(France) Fabien Pailler	8	6	2	2	86
3	(Latvia) Janis Baumanis	20	5	1	3	69
4	(France) Jonathan Pailler	5	9	10	4	60
5	(France) Ándrea Dubourg	9	2	4	14	57
6	(Germany) René Münnich	10	1		8	53
7	(Hungary) Tamás Kárai	4	3	13	5	52
8	(Norway) Thomas Bryntesson	1		8		46
9	(France) Jean-Baptiste Dubourg	2	8			35
10	(Hungary) Csucsu	6	19	6	12	30
11	(Norway) Hans-Jøran Østreng	13	16	11	11	22
12	(Sweden) Peter Hedström			3		21
13	(Sweden) Anders Michalak	12		9	16	20
14	(Germany) Mandie August	14	10	17	10	20
15	(Norway) Sivert Svardal	17	17	5	17	18
16	(France) Romuald Delauney	15	7			15
17	(Sweden) Anton Marklund	7				15
18	(Poland) Marcin Gagacki	18 (Note: Marcin Gagacki was deducted 10 championship points for the use of a third turbo in one event.)	12	19	7	14
19	(France) Stéphane De Ganay		11		13	13
20	(Hungary) Attila Mózer		14	12	15	12
21	(Poland) Dariusz Topolewski	19	24	18	9	11
22	(Lithuania) Paulius Pleskovas	24	20	16	6	10
23	(Norway) David Nordgaard	11				9
24	(France) Emmanuel Anne		13			7
25	(Czech Republic) Aleš Fučik	16		14		4
26	(Latvia) Edijs Ošs			15		2
27	(France) Laurent Bouliou		15			2
28	(France) Patrick Guillerme	21	25		18	0
29	(France) David Meslier		18			0
30	(France) Benoît Fretin		21			0
31	(Sweden) Per Eklund	22				0
32	(France) Anthony Pelfrene		22			0
33	(France) Pascal Lambec	23	23			0
Pos.	Driver	SWE (Sweden)	FRA (France)	BEL (Belgium)	POR (Portugal)	Points

Colour	Result
Gold	Winner
Silver	Second place
Bronze	Third place
Green	Points finish
Blue	Non-points finish
Blue	Non-classified finish (NC)
Purple	Retired (Ret)
Red	Did not qualify (DNQ)
Red	Did not pre-qualify (DNPQ)
Black	Disqualified (DSQ)
White	Did not start (DNS)
White	Withdrew (WD)
White	Race cancelled (C)
Blank	Did not practice (DNP)
Blank	Did not arrive (DNA)
Blank	Excluded (EX)

=== RX3 ===
Pos.	Driver	BAR (Spain)	SWE (Sweden)	FRA (France)	BEL (Belgium)	POR (Portugal)	Points
1	(Switzerland) Yury Belevskiy	1	1	2	1	1	147
2	(Belgium) Kobe Pauwels	4	2	1	4	3	115
3	(Russia) Marat Knyazev	5	3	4	2	2	114
4	(Czech Republic) Jan Cerny	7	4	5	6	7	88
5	(Russia) Timur Shigabutdinov	2	7	3		6	72
6	(Poland) Damian Litwinowicz	6	6	15	3	4	72
7	(Poland) Radoslaw Raczkowski	9	14	8	10		36
8	(Hungary) Zsolt Szíjj Jolly	3	17	7			33
9	(Estonia) Janno Ligur		5	10			31
10	(Belgium) Clément Picard			12	5		24
11	(Lithuania) Kasparas Navickas	8	9				24
12	(Czech Republic) Jiri Susta	10	13	9	7 (Note: Jiri Susta was deducted 15 championship points for the use of a third engine over the season.)		21
13	(Portugal) Nuno Araújo					5	16
14	(France) Maximilien Eveno			6			16
15	(Czech Republic) Marcel Suchý	12	19		9		16
16	(Portugal) João Ribeiro					8	15
17	(Norway) Espen Isaksætre		8				13
18	(Norway) Per Magne Egebø-Svardal		21		8		11
19	(Norway) Marius Solberg Hansen		10				11
20	(Portugal) Leonel Sampaio					9	10
21	(Portugal) Joaquim Machado					10	9
22	(Portugal) Sergio Dias					11	8
23	(Estonia) Siim Saluri	11					8
24	(France) Jérémy Lambec		18	11			7
25	(Norway) Sebastian Høidalen		11				7
26	(Germany) Lukas Ney	13	20	14			7
27	(Norway) Martin Kjær		12				6
28	(Portugal) Antonio Sousa					12	6
29	(France) Dylan Dufas		15	13			6
30	(Portugal) Pedro Ribeiro			16		13	4
31	(Portugal) Hélder Ribeiro					14	3
32	(Czech Republic) Dominik Senegacnik		16				1
33	(France) Frédéric Moreau			17			0
Pos.	Driver	BAR (Spain)	SWE (Sweden)	FRA (France)	BEL (Belgium)	POR (Portugal)	Points
