= 2021 World RX of Barcelona-Catalunya =

Rallycross event

- Round 1 of 9 in the 2021 FIA World Rallycross Championship
- Date: 23–24 July 2021
- Location: Montmeló, Barcelona
- Venue: Circuit de Barcelona-Catalunya

Results
Heat winners
- Heat 1: (Sweden) Timmy Hansen; Hansen World RX Team
- Heat 2: (Sweden) Johan Kristoffersson; KYB EKS JC
- Heat 3: (Sweden) Johan Kristoffersson; KYB EKS JC
- Heat 4: (Sweden) Johan Kristoffersson; KYB EKS JC
Semi-final winners
- Semi-final 1: (Sweden) Timmy Hansen; Hansen World RX Team
- Semi-final 2: (Sweden) Kevin Hansen; Hansen World RX Team
Final
- First: (Sweden) Kevin Hansen; Hansen World RX Team
- Second: (Sweden) Timmy Hansen; Hansen World RX Team
- Third: (Sweden) Johan Kristoffersson; KYB EKS JC

Rallycross layout of the Circuit de Catalunya

The 2021 World RX of Barcelona-Catalunya was the first round of the eighth season of the FIA World Rallycross Championship. The event was held at the Circuit de Barcelona-Catalunya in Montmeló, Catalonia. The first round of the RX3 class in the 2021 FIA European Rallycross Championship was also held at the event.

== Heats ==
=== World RX1 Championship ===
World RX1 Championship classification
| Pos. | No. | Driver | Team | Car | Q1 | Q2 | Q3 | Q4 | QP | CP |
|---|---|---|---|---|---|---|---|---|---|---|
| 1 | 21 | (Sweden) Timmy Hansen | Hansen World RX Team | Peugeot 208 | 50 | 45 | 45 | 45 | 185 | 16 |
| 2 | 9 | (Sweden) Kevin Hansen | Hansen World RX Team | Peugeot 208 | 45 | 42 | 42 | 34 | 163 | 15 |
| 3 | 44 | (Germany) Timo Scheider | ALL-INKL.COM Münnich Motorsport | Seat Ibiza | 42 | 40 | 38 | 42 | 162 | 14 |
| 4 | 68 | (Finland) Niclas Grönholm | GRX-SET World RX Team | Hyundai i20 | 39 | 39 | 40 | 40 | 158 | 13 |
| 5 | 23 | (Hungary) Krisztián Szabó | GRX-SET World RX Team | Hyundai i20 | 37 | 38 | 39 | 39 | 153 | 12 |
| 6 | 1 | (Sweden) Johan Kristoffersson | KYB EKS JC | Audi S1 | 0 (Note: Johan Kristoffersson was disqualified from Q1 due to the cars data logger not being connected during the race.) | 50 | 50 | 50 | 150 | 11 |
| 7 | 77 | (Germany) René Münnich | ALL-INKL.COM Münnich Motorsport | Seat Ibiza | 35 | 36 | 36 | 37 | 144 | 10 |
| 8 | 69 | (Netherlands) Kevin Abbring | Unkorrupted | Renault Mégane RS | 40 | 32 | 33 | 38 | 143 | 9 |
| 9 | 18 | (Finland) Juha Rytkönen | Juha Rytkönen | Ford Fiesta | 36 | 37 | 34 | 35 | 142 | 8 |
| 10 | 91 | (Belgium) Enzo Ide | KYB EKS JC | Audi S1 | 38 | 31 | 37 | 27 | 133 | 7 |
| 11 | 73 | (Hungary) Tamás Kárai | Kárai Motorsport Sportegyesület | Audi S1 | 34 | 27 | 35 | 36 | 132 | 6 |
| 12 | 42 | (United Kingdom) Oliver Bennett | Oliver Bennett | Mini Cooper | 32 | 35 | 32 | 32 | 131 | 5 |
| 13 | 38 | (Germany) Mandie August | ALL-INKL.COM Münnich Motorsport | Seat Ibiza | 33 | 33 | 31 | 33 | 130 | 4 |
| 14 | 50 | (Hungary) Attila Mózer | Nyirád Motorsport KFT | Ford Fiesta | 31 | 34 | 29 | 31 | 125 | 3 |
| 15 | 83 | (France) Patrick Guillerme | Patrick Guillerme | Hyundai i20 | 30 | 27 | 27 | 30 | 114 | 2 |
| 16 | 17 | (Sweden) Dan Öberg | Hedströms Motorsport | Volkswagen Polo | 0 (Note: Dan Öberg was disqualified from Q1 due to having pressed the launch button twice during the course of the race.) | 30 | 30 | 29 | 89 | 1 |

=== RX2e Championship ===
World RX2e Championship classification
| Pos. | No. | Driver | Team | Car | Q1 | Q2 | Q3 | Q4 | QP | CP |
|---|---|---|---|---|---|---|---|---|---|---|
| 1 | 96 | (Belgium) Guillaume De Ridder | Guillaume De Ridder | OMSE QEV RX2e | 50 | 50 | 50 | 50 | 200 | 16 |
| 2 | 35 | (Sweden) Fraser McConnell | Olsbergs MSE | OMSE QEV RX2e | 45 | 42 | 45 | 45 | 177 | 15 |
| 3 | 47 | (Finland) Jesse Kallio | Olsbergs MSE | OMSE QEV RX2e | 42 | 45 | 40 | 42 | 169 | 14 |
| 4 | 5 | (Spain) Pablo Suárez | Ruben Fernandez Gil | OMSE QEV RX2e | 37 | 38 | 42 | 40 | 157 | 13 |
| 5 | 88 | (Norway) Ole-Henry Steinsholt | Ole-Henry Steinsholt | OMSE QEV RX2e | 40 | 40 | 35 | 39 | 154 | 12 |
| 6 | 13 | (United Kingdom) Patrick O'Donovan | Patrick O'Donovan | OMSE QEV RX2e | 38 | 33 | 39 | 38 | 148 | 11 |
| 7 | 55 | (Spain) José-Luis García Molina | G4 Motors SA | OMSE QEV RX2e | 36 | 37 | 38 | 37 | 148 | 10 |
| 8 | 21 | (France) Damien Meunier | Damien Meunier | OMSE QEV RX2e | 39 | 39 | 33 | 33 | 144 | 9 |
| 9 | 77 | (United Kingdom) Mark Flaherty | Mark Flaherty | OMSE QEV RX2e | 35 | 36 | 37 | 35 | 143 | 8 |
| 10 | 36 | (Italy) Jan Oscar Ortfeldt | Jan Oscar Ortfeldt | OMSE QEV RX2e | 34 | 35 | 36 | 36 | 141 | 7 |

=== European RX3 Championship ===
European RX3 Championship classification
| Pos. | No. | Driver | Team | Car | Q1 | Q2 | Q3 | Q4 | QP | CP |
|---|---|---|---|---|---|---|---|---|---|---|
| 1 | 95 | (Switzerland) Yury Belevskiy | Volland Racing KFT. | Audi A1 | 50 | 50 | 45 | 50 | 195 | 16 |
| 2 | 22 | (Belgium) Kobe Pauwels | Volland Racing KFT. | Audi A1 | 45 | 45 | 50 | 45 | 185 | 15 |
| 3 | 11 | (Czech Republic) Jan Černý | Pajrs S.R.O. | Škoda Citigo | 39 | 39 | 37 | 42 | 157 | 14 |
| 4 | 89 | (Russia) Timur Shigabutdinov | Volland Racing KFT. | Audi A1 | 42 | 32 | 40 | 40 | 154 | 13 |
| 5 | 6 | (Poland) Damian Litwinowicz | Damian Litwinowicz | Audi A1 | 38 | 42 | 36 | 37 | 153 | 12 |
| 6 | 54 | (Russia) Marat Knyazev | Volland Racing KFT. | Audi A1 | 40 | 33 | 42 | 34 | 149 | 11 |
| 7 | 18 | (Hungary) Zsolt Szíjj Jolly | Speedy Motorsport | Audi A1 | 37 | 40 | 39 | 32 | 148 | 10 |
| 8 | 14 | (Lithuania) Kasparas Navickas | Kreda | Škoda Fabia | 36 | 38 | 35 | 35 | 144 | 9 |
| 9 | 23 | (Poland) Radosław Raczkowski | Automax Motorsport | Škoda Fabia | 30 | 35 | 38 | 39 | 142 | 8 |
| 10 | 61 | (Czech Republic) Jiři Šusta | Josef Šusta | Škoda Fabia | 33 | 36 | 34 | 38 | 141 | 7 |
| 11 | 20 | (Estonia) Siim Saluri | RS Racing Team | Renault Twingo | 34 | 37 | 33 | 36 | 140 | 6 |
| 12 | 96 | (Czech Republic) Marcel Suchý | JihoČesky Autoklub V AČR | Škoda Fabia | 35 | 34 | 32 | 33 | 134 | 5 |
| 13 | 86 | (Germany) Lukas Ney | ADAC Team Weser-Ems E.V. | Škoda Fabia | 0 (Note: Lukas Ney did not start Q1.) | 31 | 31 | 31 | 93 | 4 |

== Semi-finals ==
=== World RX1 Championship ===
==== Semi-Final 1 ====
| Pos. | No. | Driver | Team | Time | Pts |
|---|---|---|---|---|---|
| 1 | 21 | (Sweden) Timmy Hansen | Hansen World RX Team | 4:37.744 | 6 |
| 2 | 23 | (Hungary) Krisztián Szabó | GRX-SET World RX Team | + 2.729 | 5 |
| 3 | 77 | (Germany) René Münnich | ALL-INKL.COM Münnich Motorsport | + 6.235 | 4 |
| 4 | 73 | (Hungary) Tamás Kárai | Kárai Motorsport Sportegyesület | + 7.918 | 3 |
| 5 | 18 | (Finland) Juha Rytkönen | Juha Rytkönen | + 9.003 | 2 |
| 6 | 44 | (Germany) Timo Scheider | ALL-INKL.COM Münnich Motorsport | + 6 Laps | 1 |

==== Semi-Final 2 ====
| Pos. | No. | Driver | Team | Time | Pts |
|---|---|---|---|---|---|
| 1 | 9 | (Sweden) Kevin Hansen | Hansen World RX Team | 4:39.275 | 6 |
| 2 | 1 | (Sweden) Johan Kristoffersson | KYB EKS JC | + 0.691 | 5 |
| 3 | 69 | (Netherlands) Kevin Abbring | Unkorrupted | + 3.471 | 4 |
| 4 | 42 | (United Kingdom) Oliver Bennett | Oliver Bennett | + 3 Laps | 3 |
| 5 | 91 | (Belgium) Enzo Ide | KYB EKS JC | + 3 Laps | 2 |
| 6 | 68 | (Finland) Niclas Grönholm | GRX-SET World RX Team | + 6 Laps | 1 |

=== RX2e Championship ===
==== Semi-Final 1 ====
| Pos. | No. | Driver | Team | Time | Pts |
|---|---|---|---|---|---|
| 1 | 96 | (Belgium) Guillaume De Ridder | Guillaume De Ridder | 4:48.534 | 6 |
| 2 | 47 | (Finland) Jesse Kallio | Olsbergs MSE | + 0.744 | 5 |
| 3 | 88 | (Norway) Ole-Henry Steinsholt | Ole-Henry Steinsholt | + 5.940 | 4 |
| 4 | 55 | (Spain) José-Luis García Molina | G4 Motors SA | + 12.567 | 3 |
| 5 | 77 | (United Kingdom) Mark Flaherty | Mark Flaherty | + 14.360 | 2 |

==== Semi-Final 2 ====
| Pos. | No. | Driver | Team | Time | Pts |
|---|---|---|---|---|---|
| 1 | 35 | (Sweden) Fraser McConnell | Olsbergs MSE | 4:52.043 | 6 |
| 2 | 5 | (Spain) Pablo Suárez | Ruben Fernandez Gil | + 2.024 | 5 |
| 3 | 13 | (United Kingdom) Patrick O'Donovan | Patrick O'Donovan | + 3.260 | 4 |
| 4 | 21 | (France) Damien Meunier | Damien Meunier | + 3.880 | 3 |
| 5 | 36 | (Italy) Jan Oscar Ortfeldt | Escuderia Mollerussa | + 18.009 | 2 |

=== European RX3 Championship ===
==== Semi-Final 1 ====
| Pos. | No. | Driver | Team | Time | Pts |
|---|---|---|---|---|---|
| 1 | 95 | (Switzerland) Yury Belevskiy | Volland Racing KFT. | 4:58.038 | 6 |
| 2 | 6 | (Poland) Damian Litwinowicz | Damian Litwinowicz | + 4.880 | 5 |
| 3 | 18 | (Hungary) Zsolt Szíjj Jolly | Speedy Motorsport | + 8.476 | 4 |
| 4 | 23 | (Poland) Radosław Raczkowski | Automax Motorsport | + 9.914 | 3 |
| 5 | 20 | (Estonia) Siim Saluri | RS Racing Team | + 11.764 | 2 |
| 6 | 11 | (Czech Republic) Jan Černý | Pajrs S.R.O. | + 3 Laps | 1 |

==== Semi-Final 2 ====
| Pos. | No. | Driver | Team | Time | Pts |
|---|---|---|---|---|---|
| 1 | 22 | (Belgium) Kobe Pauwels | Volland Racing KFT. | 4:57.507 | 6 |
| 2 | 54 | (Russia) Marat Knyazev | Volland Racing KFT. | + 2.811 | 5 |
| 3 | 89 | (Russia) Timur Shigabutdinov | Volland Racing KFT. | + 5.710 | 4 |
| 4 | 14 | (Lithuania) Kasparas Navickas | Kreda | + 7.821 | 3 |
| 5 | 61 | (Czech Republic) Jiři Šusta | Josef Šusta | + 8.758 | 2 |
| 6 | 96 | (Czech Republic) Marcel Suchý | JihoČesky Autoklub V AČR | + 16.523 | 1 |

== Finals ==
=== World RX1 Championship ===
| Pos. | No. | Driver | Team | Time | Pts |
|---|---|---|---|---|---|
| 1 | 9 | (Sweden) Kevin Hansen | Hansen World RX Team | 4:35.533 | 8 |
| 2 | 21 | (Sweden) Timmy Hansen | Hansen World RX Team | + 1.141 | 5 |
| 3 | 1 | (Sweden) Johan Kristoffersson | KYB EKS JC | + 2.394 | 4 |
| 4 | 23 | (Hungary) Krisztián Szabó | GRX-SET World RX Team | + 3.499 | 3 |
| 5 | 77 | (Germany) René Münnich | ALL-INKL.COM Münnich Motorsport | + 7.259 | 2 |
| 6 | 69 | (Netherlands) Kevin Abbring | Unkorrupted | + 9.782 | 1 |

=== RX2e Championship ===
| Pos. | No. | Driver | Team | Time | Pts |
|---|---|---|---|---|---|
| 1 | 96 | (Belgium) Guillaume De Ridder | Guillaume De Ridder | 4:49.451 | 8 |
| 2 | 88 | (Norway) Ole-Henry Steinsholt | Ole-Henry Steinsholt | + 4.195 | 5 |
| 3 | 13 | (United Kingdom) Patrick O'Donovan | Patrick O'Donovan | + 6.057 | 4 |
| 4 | 5 | (Spain) Pablo Suárez | Ruben Fernandez Gil | + 6.515 | 3 |
| 5 | 47 | (Finland) Jesse Kallio | Jesse Kallio | + 5 Laps | 2 |
| 6 | 35 | (Sweden) Fraser McConnell | Fraser McConnell | + 6 Laps | 1 |

=== European RX3 Championship ===
| Pos. | No. | Driver | Team | Time | Pts |
|---|---|---|---|---|---|
| 1 | 95 | (Switzerland) Yury Belevskiy | Volland Racing KFT. | 4:57.759 | 8 |
| 2 | 89 | (Russia) Timur Shigabutdinov | Volland Racing KFT. | + 1.069 | 5 |
| 3 | 18 | (Hungary) Zsolt Szíjj Jolly | Speedy Motorsport | + 6.685 | 4 |
| 4 | 22 | (Belgium) Kobe Pauwels | Volland Racing KFT. | + 7.142 | 3 |
| 5 | 54 | (Russia) Marat Knyazev | Volland Racing KFT. | + 12.480 (Note: Marat Knyazev was given a ten-second penalty for continuously pushing Kobe Pauwels in turn 1 on lap 1.) | 2 |
| 6 | 6 | (Poland) Damian Litwinowicz | Damian Litwinowicz | + 28.392 | 1 |

== Standings after the event ==
=== World RX1 Championship ===
| Pos | Driver | Pts |
|---|---|---|
| 1 | (Sweden) Kevin Hansen | 29 |
| 2 | (Sweden) Timmy Hansen | 27 |
| 3 | (Sweden) Johan Kristoffersson | 20 |
| 4 | (Hungary) Krisztián Szabó | 20 |
| 5 | (Germany) René Münnich | 16 |

=== RX2e Championship ===
| Pos | Driver | Pts |
|---|---|---|
| 1 | (Belgium) Guillaume De Ridder | 30 |
| 2 | (Sweden) Fraser McConnell | 22 |
| 3 | (Norway) Ole-Henry Steinsholt | 21 |
| 4 | (Spain) Pablo Suárez | 21 |
| 5 | (Finland) Jesse Kallio | 21 |

=== European RX3 Championship ===
| Pos | Driver | Pts |
|---|---|---|
| 1 | (Switzerland) Yury Belevskiy | 30 |
| 2 | (Belgium) Kobe Pauwels | 24 |
| 3 | (Russia) Timur Shigabutdinov | 22 |
| 4 | (Hungary) Zsolt Szíjj Jolly | 18 |
| 5 | (Russia) Marat Knyazev | 18 |

- Note: Only the top five positions are included.

== Notes ==
| Previous race: 2020 World RX of Catalunya | FIA World Rallycross Championship; 2021 season | Next race: 2021 World RX of Sweden |
| Previous race: 2020 World RX of Catalunya | World RX of Catalunya | Next race: - |
