= Kobe Pauwels =

Belgian racing driver (born 2004)

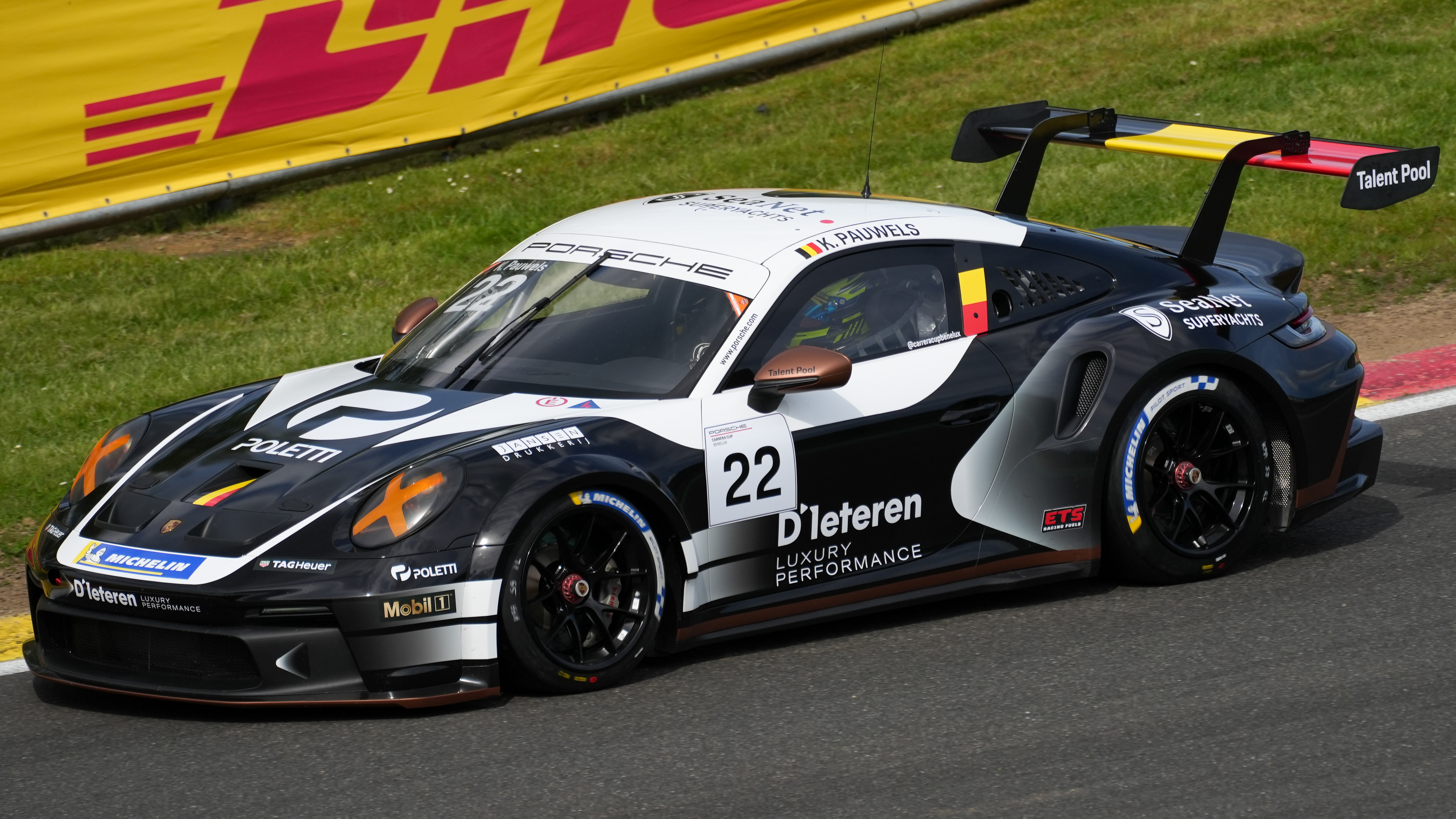
- Pauwels at Circuit de Spa-Francorchamps in 2024
- Nationality: (Belgium) Belgian
- Born: 23 October 2004 (age 22) Diest, Belgium
- Categorisation: FIA Silver

Championship titles
- 2025: GT World Challenge Europe Sprint Cup – Silver Cup

Kobe Pauwels (born 23 October 2004 in Diest) is a Belgian racing driver who last competed for Comtoyou Racing in GT World Challenge Europe.

Pauwels is the 2024 24 Hours of Zolder winner.

== Early career ==
=== Karting ===
Pauwels started karting in 2014. During his time in karts, Pauwels most notably was runner-up in the 2018 FIA Karting Academy Trophy and was a factory driver for Birel ART during his final year of karting in 2020.

=== Rallycross ===
One year after competing in the 25th edition of the Volant Winfield, Pauwels made his debut in Rallycross by competing in the RallyX Nordic Championship in 2020.

In 2021, Pauwels stepped up to the RX3 class of the European Rallycross Championship with Volland Racing KFT. Pauwels won the round in France and finished runner-up in the standings to Yury Belevskiy. During 2021, Pauwels also made his World Rallycross debut in the RX2e category at the Nürburgring round.

Pauwels returned to the European Rallycross Championship in 2022, winning four out of five races on his way to the RX3 title at season's end. Two years after his RX3 title, Pauwels returned to the European Rallycross Championship in 2024 at the Mettet round. On his return to the series, Pauwels took his first win in RX2e.

=== Touring cars ===
Having made his circuit racing debut in the Ford Fiesta Sprint Cup Benelux in 2022, Pauwels joined Comtoyou Racing in early 2023 to compete in the TCR Europe Touring Car Series. Scoring his first overall podium at Pau, Pauwels scored his first overall win at Le Castellet, before taking two more wins at Monza and Barcelona to end the season third in points.

== GT career ==
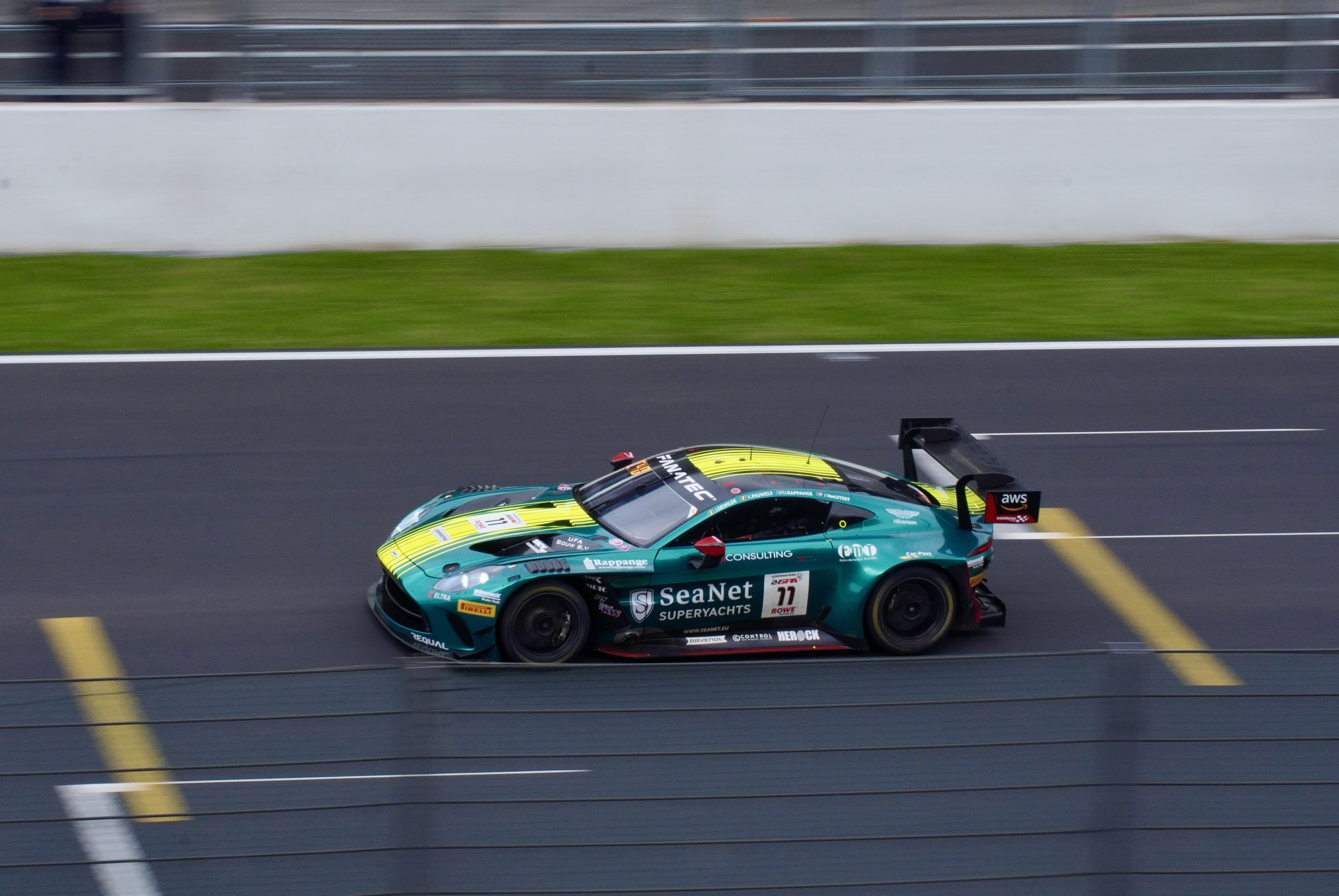
Pauwels' Comtoyou Aston Martin at the 2024 24 Hours of Spa.

Pauwels made his GT3 debut at the Nürburgring round of the 2023 GT World Challenge Europe Endurance Cup. On his debut, Pauwels scored points by finishing eighth in the three-hour enduro.

Comtoyou Racing retained Pauwels for the GT World Challenge Europe Endurance Cup season, competing in the first three rounds in the Bronze Cup, scoring a class podium at the first round of the season at Le Castellet. After switching to Comtoyou's Silver lineup at Monza and scoring a class podium, Pauwels joined Saintéloc Racing for the season-ending Jeddah round. In the six hour enduro, Pauwels scored a class win in his only race for the French team.

In early 2024, it was announced that Pauwels would compete for NGT Motorsport in the Porsche Carrera Cup Benelux. Scoring a best result of fourth in race two at Assen, Pauwels was crowned Rookie champion at the season-ending round at Zolder.

Pauwels returned to Comtoyou Racing for 2025, competing in both the GT World Challenge Europe Endurance Cup and GT World Challenge Europe Sprint Cups. Finishing 33rd in the Silver Cup standings of the former, Pauwels found more success in the latter, scoring three class wins and two more podiums to secure the Silver Cup title at the season finale in Valencia, as he also graduated from the Aston Martin Racing Driver Academy at the end of the year. At the end of the year, Pauwels joined Ecurie Ecosse Blackthorn to race in the GT class of the 2025–26 Asian Le Mans Series, taking a lone win at Abu Dhabi to end the season eighth in points.

For the rest of 2026, Pauwels returned to Comtoyou Racing for another dual campaign in both the GT World Challenge Europe Endurance Cup and GT World Challenge Europe Sprint Cups. In the Endurance Cup, Pauwels took a lone Silver class win at Le Castellet to take ninth in points, while in the Sprint Cup, he took his maiden overall podium at Magny-Cours as he ended the season 19th overall. During 2026, Pauwels also joined Heart of Racing Team to make his FIA World Endurance Championship debut at the 6 Hours of Imola in LMGT3, before returning for the 6 Hours of São Paulo and taking his maiden series pole over the #79 Iron Lynx AMG. At the end of the year, Pauwels returned to Ecurie Ecosse Blackthorn to race in the GT3 class of the 2026–27 Asian Le Mans Series.

== Personal life ==
Pauwels is a third generation racing driver; his grandfather Benny competed in domestic rallycross competitions, whilst his father Koen raced in the inaugural World Rallycross Championship.

== Karting record ==
=== Karting career summary ===
Season	Series	Team	Position
2014	BNL Karting Series – Rotax Micro		6th
2014	BNL Karting Series – Mini Max		15th
2015	BNL Karting Series – Mini Max		8th
2016	BNL International Kart Series – Mini		2nd
2016	Euro Finale – Mini Max Small		1st
2016	Rotax Challenge Grand Finals - Mini Max		7th
2017	Rotax Winter Cup - Rotax Junior	Daems Racing	19th
2017	Rotax Euro Challenge - Rotax Junior	Daems Racing	6th
2017	Karting Academy Trophy	Pauwels Koen	14th
2017	BNL Golden Trophy – Junior Max		4th
2018	Karting Academy Trophy	Pauwels Koen	2nd
2018	Rotax Challenge Grand Finals - Rotax Junior	Pauwels Koen	9th
2018	WSK Open Cup - OKJ	KMS Europe	32nd
2018	Rotax Max Euro Trophy – Rotax Junior		4th
2018	Hungarian International Open Championship – Junior	Pauwels Racing	30th
2019	WSK Champions Cup - OK	Pauwels Koen	7th
2019	South Garda Winter Cup - OK	RS Schumacher Racing Team	NC
2019	German Kart Championship - OK	CV Performance Group	NC
2019	IAME Euro Series - X30 Senior	CV Performance Group	NC
2019	FIA Karting European Championship - OK	CV Performance Group	15th
2019	Karting World Championship - OK	CV Performance Group	25th
2019	WSK Open Cup - OK	CV Performance Group	26th
2019	French Karting Championship - OK	CV Performance Group (Rd.1); Pauwels Koen (Rd.2)	5th
2020	WSK Super Master Series - OK	BirelArt Racing Srl	61st
2020	WSK Euro Series - OK	BirelArt Racing Srl	53rd
2020	FIA Karting European Championship - KZ2	BirelArt Racing Srl	62nd

== Racing record ==
=== Racing career summary ===
Season	Series	Team	Races	Wins	Poles	F/Laps	Podiums	Points	Position
2021	European Rallycross Championship – RX3	Volland Racing KFT	5	1	N/A	N/A	3	115	**2nd**
2021	World Rallycross Championship – RX2e	Ann Luijten	1	0	N/A	N/A	0	21	15th
2022	European Rallycross Championship – RX3	Volland Racing KFT	5	4	N/A	N/A	5	96	**1st**
2022	Ford Fiesta Sprint Cup Benelux		4	0	2	2	2	78	7th
2023	TCR Europe Touring Car Series	Comtoyou Racing	13	6	1	5	9	433	**3rd**
2023	TCR World Tour	Comtoyou Racing	8	0	0	0	0	74	14th
2023	GT World Challenge Europe Endurance Cup	Comtoyou Racing	1	0	0	0	0	4	24th
2023–24	Middle East Trophy – TCR	AC Motorsport	1	0	0	0	1	36	4th
2024	GT World Challenge Europe Endurance Cup	Comtoyou Racing	4	0	0	0	0	0	NC
2024	GT World Challenge Europe Endurance Cup	Saintéloc Racing	1	0	0	0	0	0	NC
2024	GT World Challenge Europe Endurance Cup – Bronze	Comtoyou Racing	3	0	0	0	0	34	11th
2024	GT World Challenge Europe Endurance Cup – Silver	Comtoyou Racing	1	0	0	0	1	52	9th
2024	GT World Challenge Europe Endurance Cup – Silver	Saintéloc Racing	1	1	0	0	1	52	9th
2024	Porsche Carrera Cup Benelux	D’ieteren Luxury Performance	12	0	0	0	0	112.5	8th
2024	Porsche Carrera Cup France	Speedlover	2	0	0	0	0	0	NC
2024	European Rallycross Championship – RX2e	Kobe Pauwels	1	1	N/A	N/A	1	29	8th
2025	Middle East Trophy – GT3	Comtoyou Racing	1	0	0	0	0	0	NC
2025	GT Winter Series – GT3	Comtoyou Racing	6	2	0	0	5	96	5th
2025	GT World Challenge Europe Endurance Cup	Comtoyou Racing	5	0	0	0	0	0	NC
2025	GT World Challenge Europe Endurance Cup – Silver Cup	Comtoyou Racing	5	0	0	0	0	8	33rd
2025	GT World Challenge Europe Sprint Cup	Comtoyou Racing	10	0	0	0	0	7	19th
2025	GT World Challenge Europe Sprint Cup – Silver Cup	Comtoyou Racing	10	3	2	2	5	102	**1st**
2025–26	Asian Le Mans Series – GT	Ecurie Ecosse Blackthorn	6	1	0	0	2	47	8th
2026	Nürburgring Langstrecken-Serie – VT2-FWD+4WD	SRS Team Sorg Rennsport							
2026	GT World Challenge Europe Endurance Cup	Comtoyou Racing	5	0	0	0	0	0	NC
2026	GT World Challenge Europe Endurance Cup – Silver	Comtoyou Racing	5	0	1	1	1	39	9th
2026	GT World Challenge Europe Sprint Cup	Comtoyou Racing	10	0	1	1	1	16.5	19th
2026	FIA World Endurance Championship – LMGT3	Heart of Racing Team	2	0	1	0	0	3	26th
2026	Le Mans Cup – GT3	Ecurie Ecosse Blackthorn	1	0	0	0	0	0	NC†
2026	International GT Open	Blackthorn	2	0	0	0	0	0	48th
2026	International GT Open – Pro-Am	Blackthorn	2	0	0	0	0	8	19th
2026–27	Asian Le Mans Series – GT3	Ecurie Ecosse Blackthorn						*	*

=== Complete FIA European Rallycross Championship results ===
(key)

==== RX3 ====
Year	Entrant	Car	1	2	3	4	5	ERX	Points
2021	Volland Racing KFT	Audi A1	BAR; 4	SWE; 2	FRA; 1	BEL; 4	POR; 3	**2nd**	**115**
2022	Volland Racing KFT	Audi A1	HUN; 1	SWE; 2	NOR; 1	POR; 1	GER; 1	**1st**	**96**

==== RX2e ====
Year	Entrant	Car	1	2	3	4	ERX	Points
2024	Kobe Pauwels	ZEROID X1	SWE	HUN	BEL; 1	PRT	8th	29

=== Complete FIA World Rallycross Championship results ===
(key)

==== RX2e ====
Year	Entrant	Car	1	2	3	4	5	Pos.	Points
2021	Ann Luijten	ZEROID X1	BAR	SWE	FRA	BEL	GER; 4	15th	21

=== Complete TCR Europe Touring Car Series results ===
(key) (Races in bold indicate pole position) (Races in italics indicate fastest lap)

Year	Team	Car	1	2	3	4	5	6	7	8	9	10	11	12	13	14	DC	Points
2023	Comtoyou Racing	Audi RS 3 LMS TCR	ALG; 1; 10^{2}	ALG; 2 Ret	PAU; 1; 2^{3}	PAU; 2; 4	**SPA**; **1**; 4^{1}	SPA; 2 Ret	HUN; 1; 10^{4}	HUN; 2; 7	LEC; 1; 3^{3}	LEC; 2; 1	MNZ; 1; 1^{2}	MNZ; 2; 6	CAT; 1; 1^{2}	CAT; 2 DNS	3rd	433

=== Complete TCR World Tour results ===
(key) (Races in bold indicate pole position) (Races in italics indicate fastest lap)

Year	Team	Car	1	2	3	4	5	6	7	8	9	10	11	12	13	14	15	16	17	18	19	20	DC	Points
2023	Comtoyou Racing	Audi RS 3 LMS TCR	ALG; 1; 10	ALG; 2 Ret	SPA; 1; 4^{4}	SPA; 2 Ret	VAL; 1; 8	VAL; 2; 11	HUN; 1; 10	HUN; 2; 7	ELP; 1	ELP; 2	VIL; 1	VIL; 2	SYD; 1	SYD; 2	SYD; 3	BAT; 1	BAT; 2	BAT; 3	MAC; 1	MAC; 2	14th	74

=== Complete GT World Challenge Europe results ===
==== GT World Challenge Europe Endurance Cup ====
(Races in bold indicate pole position) (Races in italics indicate fastest lap)

Year	Team	Car	Class	1	2	3	4	5	6	7	Pos.	Points
2023	Comtoyou Racing	Audi R8 LMS Evo II	Pro	MNZ	LEC	SPA; 6H	SPA; 12H	SPA; 24H	NÜR; 8	CAT	24th	4
2024	Comtoyou Racing	Aston Martin Vantage AMR GT3 Evo	Bronze	LEC; 24	SPA; 6H; 18	SPA; 12H; 33	SPA; 24H; 20	NÜR; Ret			11th	34
2024	Comtoyou Racing	Aston Martin Vantage AMR GT3 Evo	Silver						MNZ; 15		9th	52
2024	Saintéloc Racing	Audi R8 LMS Evo II	Silver							JED; 13	9th	52
2025	Comtoyou Racing	Aston Martin Vantage AMR GT3 Evo	Silver	LEC; 36	**MNZ**; Ret	SPA; 6H; 62	SPA; 12H; 54	SPA; 24H; Ret	NÜR; 26	CAT; 49	33rd	8
2026	Comtoyou Racing	Aston Martin Vantage AMR GT3 Evo	Silver	**LEC**; 20	MNZ; 27	SPA; 6H; 28	SPA; 12H; 59†	SPA; 24H; Ret	NÜR; 24	ALG; 32	9th	39

==== GT World Challenge Europe Sprint Cup ====
Year	Team	Car	Class	1	2	3	4	5	6	7	8	9	10	Pos.	Points
2025	Comtoyou Racing	Aston Martin Vantage AMR GT3 Evo	Silver	BRH; 1; 27	BRH; 2; 14	ZAN; 1; 15	ZAN; 2; 8	MIS; 1; 17	MIS; 2; 9	MAG; 1; 7	**MAG**; **2**; 9	**VAL**; **1**; 11	VAL; 2; 17	1st	102
2026	Comtoyou Racing	Aston Martin Vantage AMR GT3 Evo	Pro	BRH; 1; 9	BRH; 2; 14	MIS; 1; 16	MIS; 2 Ret	MAG; 1; 3	**MAG**; **2**; 18	ZAN; 1; 9	ZAN; 2 Ret	CAT; 1; 18	CAT; 2; 7	19th	16.5

=== Complete Porsche Carrera Cup Benelux results ===
(key) (Races in bold indicate pole position) (Races in italics indicate fastest lap)

Year	Team	1	2	3	4	5	6	7	8	9	10	11	12	DC	Points
2024	D’ieteren Luxury Performance	SPA; 1; 5	SPA; 2; 6	ZAN; 1; 8	ZAN; 2; 6	IMO; 1; 7	IMO; 2; 6	ASS; 1; 9	ASS; 2; 4	RBR; 1; 9	RBR; 2; 5	ZOL; 1; 10	ZOL; 2; 10	8th	112.5

=== Complete Asian Le Mans Series results ===
(key) (Races in bold indicate pole position) (Races in italics indicate fastest lap)

Year	Team	Class	Car	Engine	1	2	3	4	5	6	Pos.	Points
2025–26	Ecurie Ecosse Blackthorn	GT	Aston Martin Vantage AMR GT3	Aston Martin M177 4.0 L Turbo V8	SEP; 1; 3	SEP; 2; 13	DUB; 1 Ret	DUB; 2; 10	ABU; 1; 8	ABU; 2; 1	8th	47

=== Complete FIA World Endurance Championship results ===
(key) (Races in bold indicate pole position) (Races in italics indicate fastest lap)

Year	Entrant	Class	Car	Engine	1	2	3	4	5	6	7	8	Rank	Points
2026	Heart of Racing Team	LMGT3	Aston Martin Vantage AMR GT3 Evo	Aston Martin 4.0 L Turbo V8	IMO; 9	SPA	LMS	**SÃO**; 18	COA	FUJ	CAT	MNZ	26th	3
