= Höljesbanan =

Swedish rallycross circuit

"The Home of Swedish Rallycross"
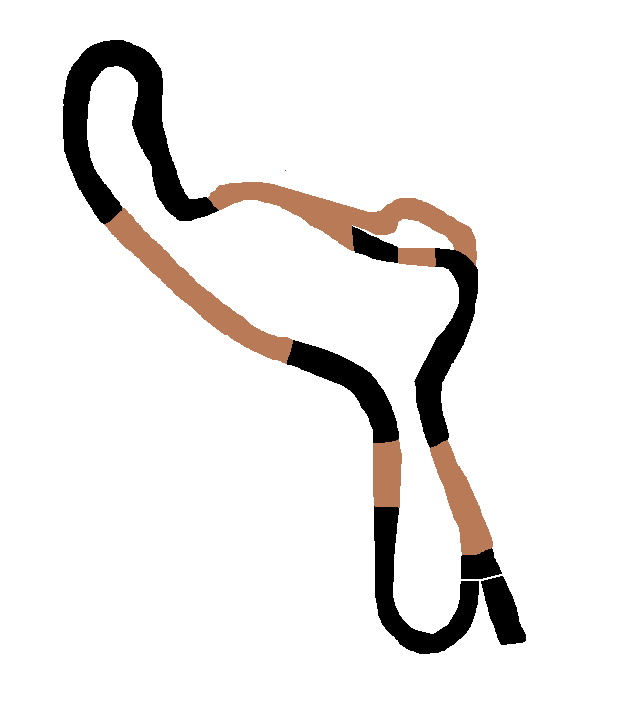
- Rallycross Circuit (1976–present)
- Location: Höljes, Värmland, Sweden
- Coordinates: 60°55′01″N 12°33′18″E
- Capacity: Unlimited (Record: 45,100)
- FIA Grade: 6R (Rallycross)
- Operator: Finnskoga Motorklubb
- Broke ground: October 1974; 51 years ago
- Opened: 1 February 1976; 50 years ago
- Major events: Current: FIA European Rallycross Championship; Euro RX of Sweden (1991, 1993, 1997, 1999–present); Former: FIA World Rallycross Championship; World RX of Sweden (2014–2021, 2023–2025)

Rallycross Circuit (1976–present)
- Surface: Asphalt (60%); Gravel (40%)
- Length: 1.210 km (0.752 mi)

Höljesbanan, also known as Höljes Motorstadion, is a 1.210 km (0.752 mi) rallycross circuit situated in the village of Höljes, in the Finnskogen ('Finnwoods') of the Swedish county Värmland, beside the river Klarälven and close to the Norwegian border. The circuit opened in February 1976 and is one of the most famous rallycross circuits in the world. Traditionally held over the first weekend of July the venue plays host to the so-called 'Magic Weekend' of rallycross when it runs the Swedish round of the European and World Rallycross championships.

== History ==
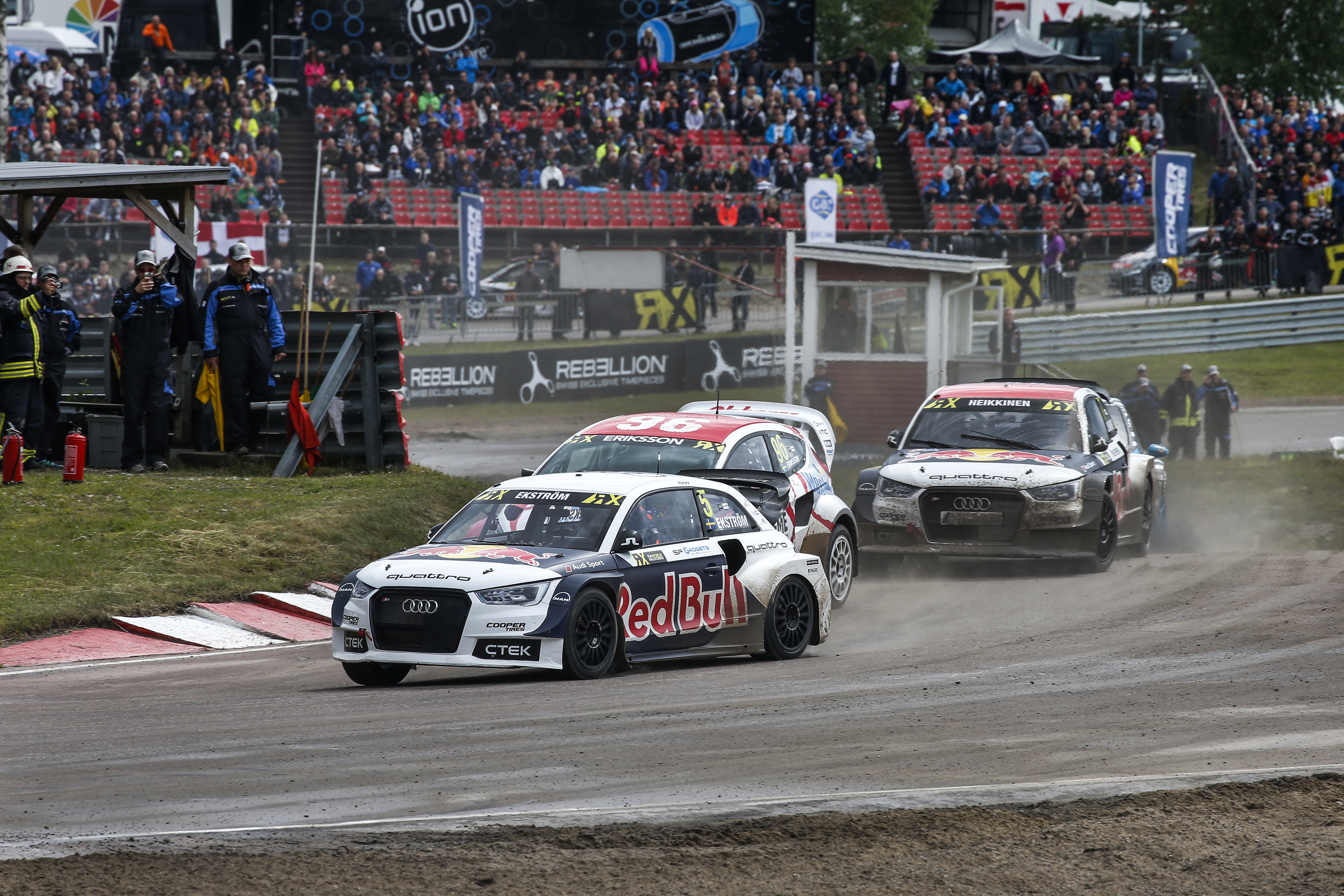
The first corner on the circuit

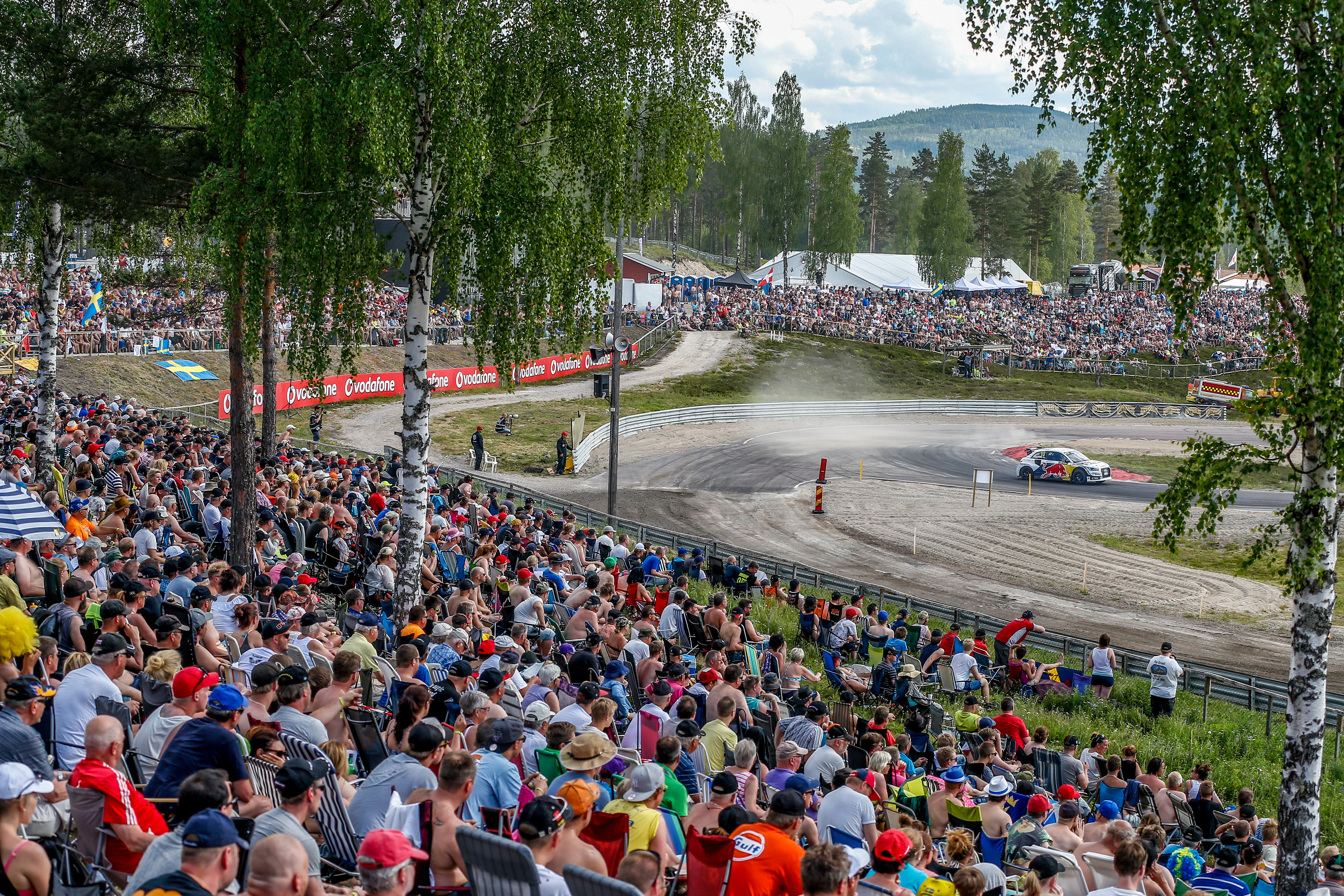
The split for the regular and joker laps at the start of the circuit

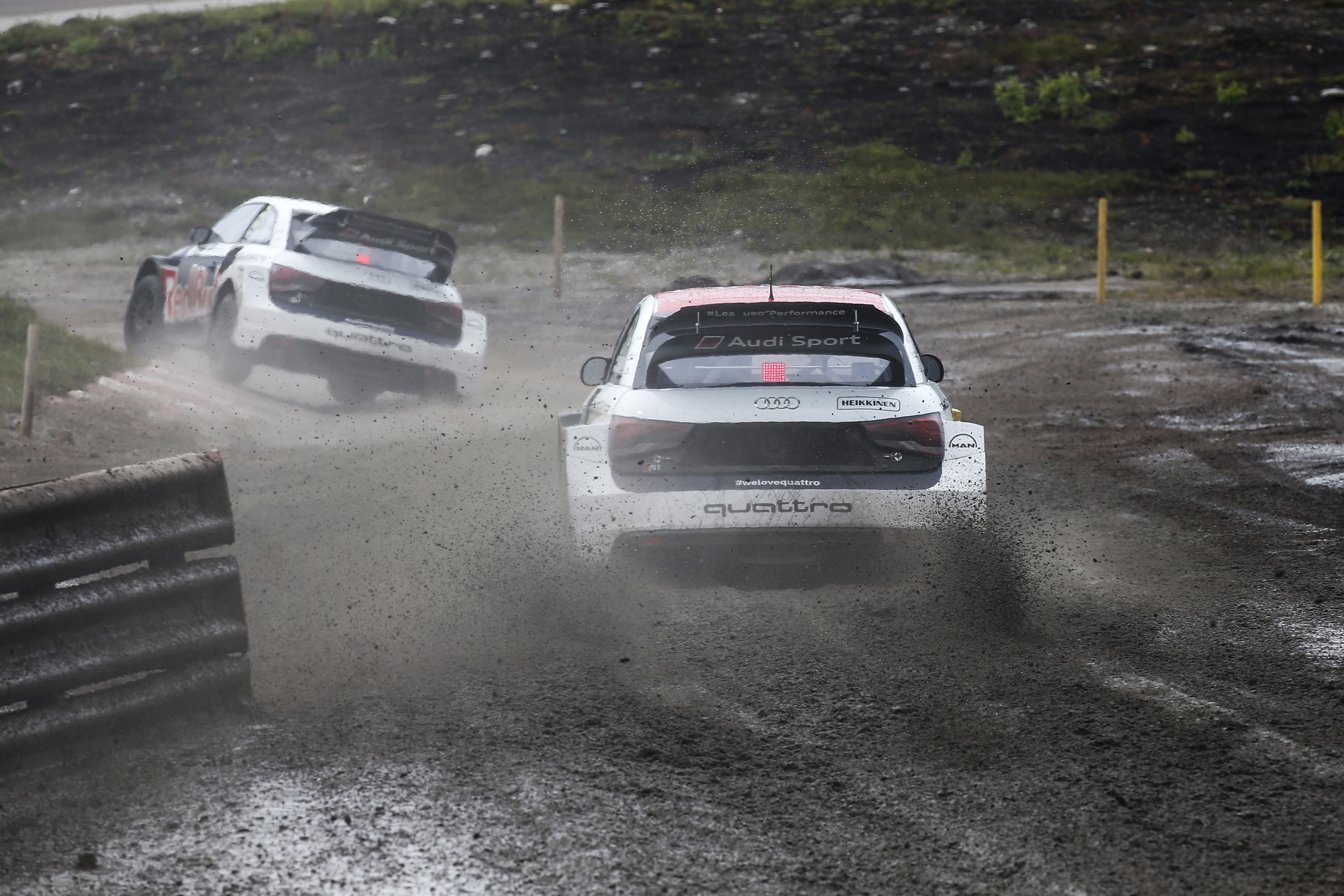
The joker lap exit

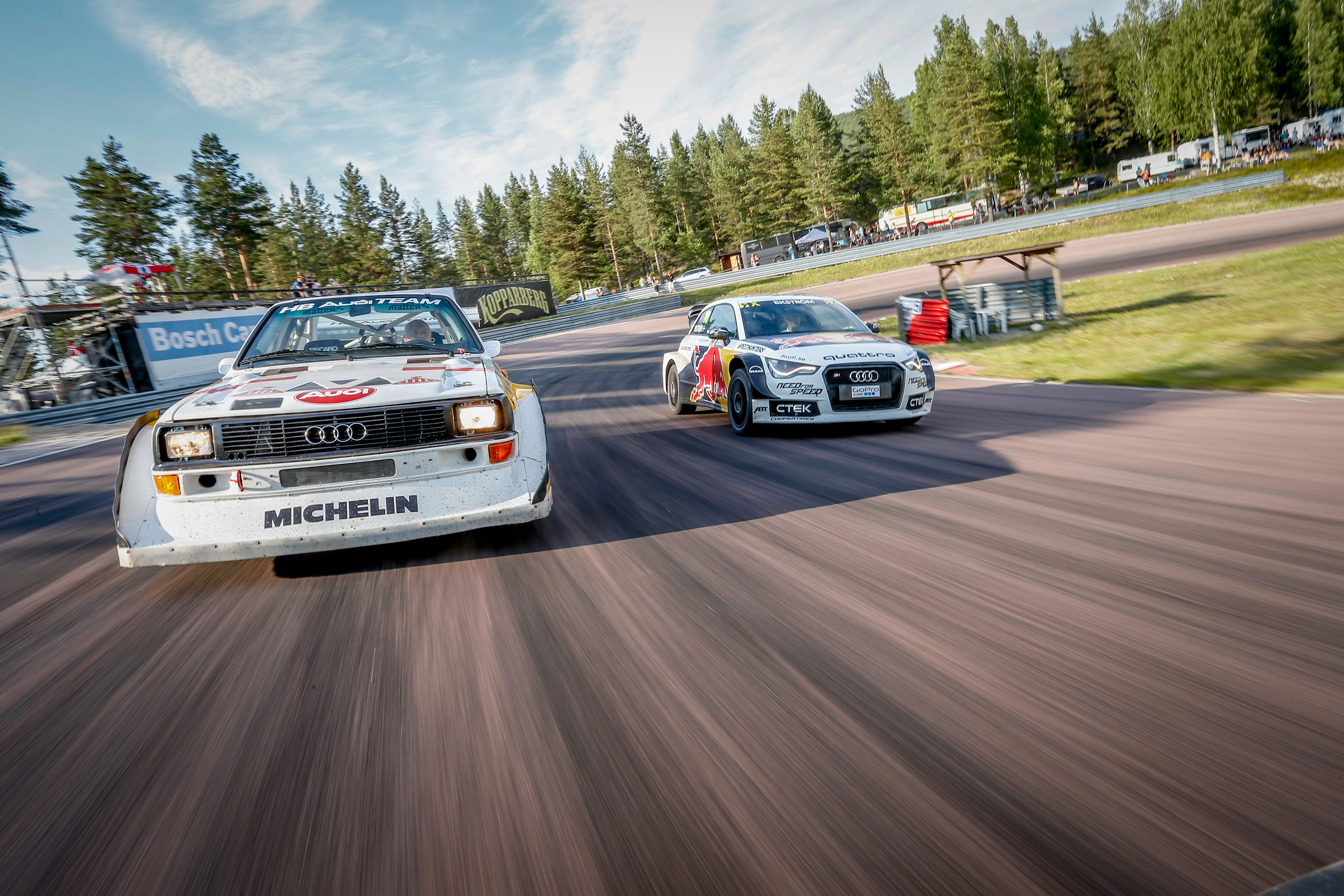
The Velodrome corner at the far end of the circuit

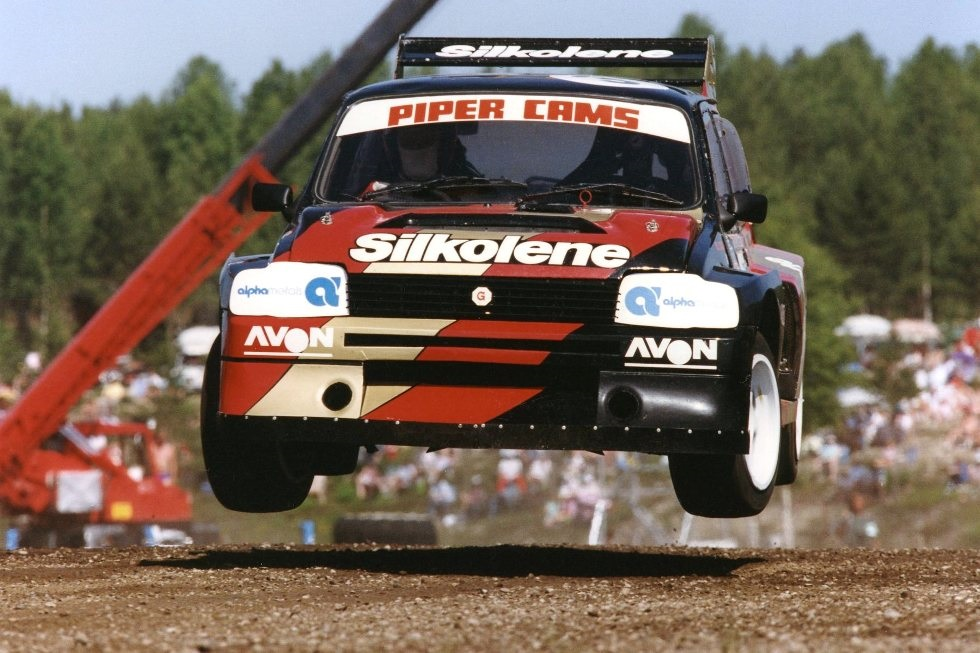
The infamous Höljes jump is one of the most iconic images in Rallycross...

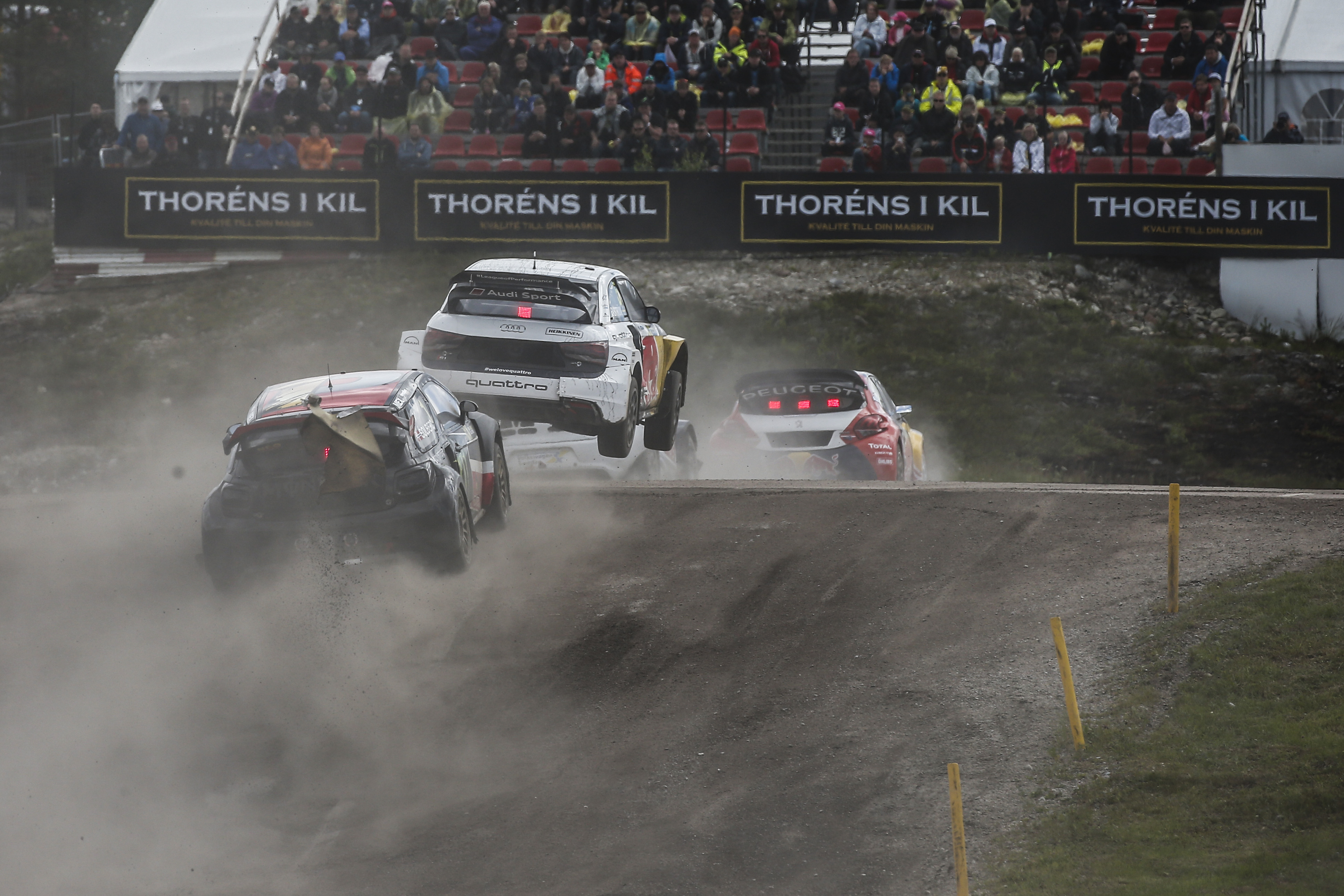
...and has retained its character despite changing from gravel to tarmac after 1991

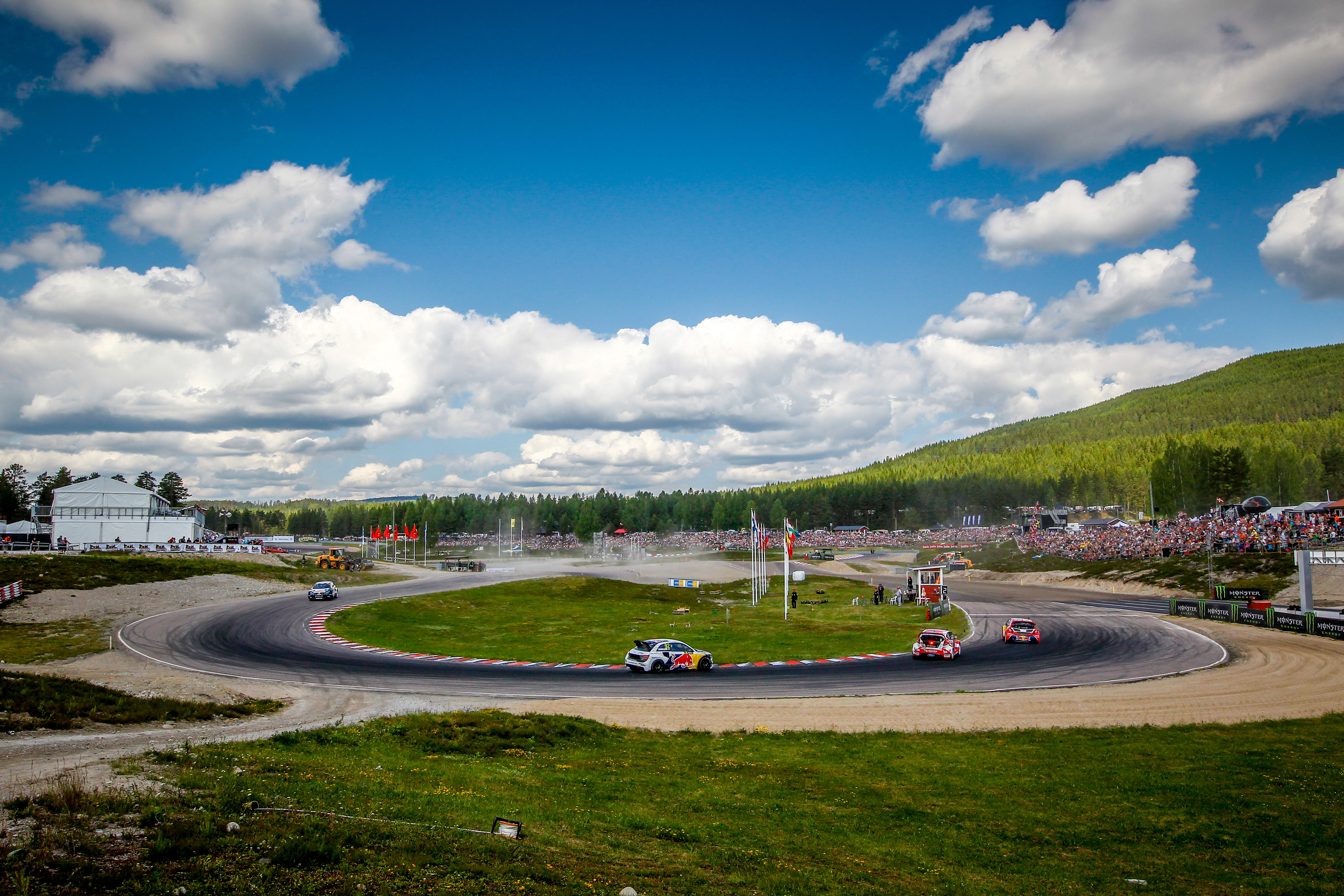
The final corner. The VIP marquee is seen on the left, and the grid is on the right just out of shot

The circuit was originally part of a go-kart centre opened in 1972 by the Finnskoga Motorklubb following the influx of Swedish drivers into Formula One, but quickly fell into disuse and it was decided the nearby gravel pit was to be turned into a rallycross circuit in October 1974. On February 1, 1976, the circuit held its first event in front of 3,500 people on a bitterly cold winters' day, and was won by Per Eklund.

The circuit was successful locally and the Finnskoga Masters was created as a marquee event for Scandinavian drivers. The circuit saw very little national action as the Swedish ASN were not on good terms with the Finnskoga Motorklubb, and despite having a suitable venue the Svenska Bilsportförbundet (SBF) did not straight away recommend the circuits' addition to the FIA European Rallycross Championship due to the conflict. However, the circuit did eventually make its international debut for the Swedish round of the 1991 European Rallycross Championship. The event was held on July 7 in front of 15,000 people and quickly gained approval from drivers and fans alike. The Swedish round rotated through various circuits in the 1990s but the Höljesbanan became a permanent fixture in 1999 and is now a marquee event within it and the newly formed World Championship.

== Event history ==
=== European rallycross ===
European Championship winners
Year	Division	Driver	Car
1991	Division 1	(Sweden) Kenneth Hansen	Ford Sierra RS 500 Cosworth
1991	Division 2	(United Kingdom) Will Gollop	MG Metro 6R4 BiTurbo
1992	Not Held		
1993	Division 1	(Norway) Eivind Opland	Nissan Sunny GTI-R
1993	Division 2	(Sweden) Kenneth Hansen	Citroën ZX T16 4x4
1993	1400cc Cup	(Sweden) Björn Ohlsson	Citroën AX Sport
1994	Not Held		
1995	Not Held		
1996	Not Held		
1997	Division 1	(Norway) Ludvig Hunsbedt	Ford Escort RS 2000 T16 4x4
1997	Division 2	(Norway) Eivind Opland	Mitsubishi Lancer Evolution III
1997	1400cc Cup	(Sweden) Roger Lagergren	Peugeot 205 Rallye
1998	Not Held		
1999	Division 1	(Norway) Ludvig Hunsbedt	Ford Escort RS 2000 T16 4x4
1999	Division 2	(Denmark) Gert Vestergaard	Peugeot 306 S16
1999	1400cc Cup	(Denmark) Peter Nielsen	Rover Metro GTi
2000	Division 1	(Sweden) Kenneth Hansen	Citroën Xsara WRC
2000	Division 2	(Sweden) Magnus Hansen	Citroën Xsara VTS
2000	1400cc Cup	(Denmark) Sven Seeliger	Citroën AX GTi
2001	Division 1	(Sweden) Kenneth Hansen	Citroën Xsara WRC
2001	Division 2	(Sweden) Magnus Hansen	Citroën Xsara VTS
2001	Division 2A	(Denmark) Sven Seeliger	Citroën AX GTi
2002	Division 1	(Sweden) Kenneth Hansen	Citroën Xsara WRC
2002	Division 2	(Finland) Jouko Kallio	Honda Civic Type R
2002	Division 2A	(Czech Republic) Aleš Zázvorka	Volkswagen Polo 1.4 16V
2003	Division 1	(Sweden) Kenneth Hansen	Citroën Xsara T16 4x4
2003	Division 1A	(Czech Republic) Jaroslav Kalný	Peugeot 206
2003	Division 2	(Norway) Guttorm Lindefjell	Opel Astra OPC
2004	Division 1	(Norway) Sverre Isachsen	Ford Focus T16 4x4
2004	Division 1A	(Netherlands) Ron Snoeck	SEAT Ibiza
2004	Division 2	(Finland) Jussi Pinomäki	Renault Clio RSR
2005	Division 1	(Sweden) Michael Jernberg	Ford Focus T16 4x4
2005	Division 1A	(Czech Republic) Zdeněk Čermák	Škoda Fabia
2005	Division 2	(Sweden) Niklas Hagström	Honda Civic Type R
2006	Division 1	(Norway) Sverre Isachsen	Ford Focus T16 4x4
2006	Division 1A	(Czech Republic) Jaroslav Kalný	Peugeot 206
2006	Division 2	(Sweden) Niklas Hagström	Honda Civic Type R
2007	Division 1	(Sweden) Lars Larsson	Škoda Fabia 6Y T16 4x4
2007	Division 1A	(Belgium) Michaël de Keersmaecker	Opel Corsa C
2007	Division 2	(Sweden) Niklas Hagström	Honda Civic Type R
2007	RX Cup	(Belgium) Jos Sterkens	Ford Fiesta RWD
2008	Division 1	(Finland) Marcus Grönholm	Ford Fiesta ST
2008	Division 1A	(Finland) Jussi Pinomäki	Renault Clio
2008	Division 2	(Czech Republic) Tomáš Kotek	Honda Civic Type R
2008	RX Cup	(Sweden) Per Niklas Lööv	Citroën Xsara RWD
2009	Division 1	(Sweden) Stig-Olov Walfridsson	Renault Clio T16 4x4
2009	Division 1A	(Russia) Timur Timerzyanov	Renault Clio Mk2
2009	Division 2	(Norway) Knut Ove Børseth	Ford Fiesta ST RWD
2010	Division 1	(Norway) Sverre Isachsen	Ford Focus ST
2010	Division 1A	(Russia) Timur Timerzyanov	Renault Clio Mk2
2010	Division 2	(Norway) Lars Øivind Enerberg	Ford Fiesta ST RWD
2011	Supercars	(United States) Tanner Foust	Ford Fiesta T16 4x4
2011	Super1600	(Poland) Krzysztof Skorupski	Volkswagen Polo 9N3
2011	TouringCar	(Norway) Lars Øivind Enerberg	Ford Fiesta ST RWD
2012	Supercars	(Russia) Timur Timerzyanov	Citroën DS3 T16 4x4
2012	Super1600	(Denmark) Ulrik Linnemann	Peugeot 207
2012	TouringCar	(Sweden) Robin Larsson	Škoda Fabia 6Y RWD
2012	Junior Cup	(Sweden) Kevin Hansen	"Citroën DS3" JRX
2013	Supercars	(Norway) Andreas Bakkerud	Citroën DS3
2013	Super1600	(Denmark) Ulrik Linnemann	Peugeot 207
2013	TouringCar	(Republic of Ireland) Derek Tohill	Ford Fiesta RWD
2013	Junior Cup	(Sweden) Kevin Hansen	"Citroën DS3" JRX
2014	Super1600	(Russia) Sergey Zagumennov	Škoda Fabia 5J
2014	TouringCar	(Norway) Tom Daniel Tånevik	Mazda RX-8
2015	Super1600	(Latvia) Jānis Baumanis	Renault Twingo Mk2
2015	TouringCar	(Sweden) Fredrik Salsten	Citroën DS3 RWD
2016	Supercars	(Sweden) Kevin Hansen	Peugeot 208
2016	Super1600	(Denmark) Ulrik Linnemann	Peugeot 208
2016	TouringCar	(Norway) Ben-Philip Gundersen	Ford Fiesta ST RWD
2017	Supercar	(Sweden) Anton Marklund	Volkswagen Polo R Mk5
2017	Super1600	(Latvia) Artis Baumanis	Škoda Fabia
2018	Supercar	(Latvia) Reinis Nitišs	Ford Fiesta
2018	TouringCar	(Norway) Fredrik Rolid Magnussen	Ford Fiesta
2019	Supercar	(Sweden) Robin Larsson	Audi S1
2019	Super1600	(Norway) Marius Bermingrud	Škoda Fabia
2020	Supercar	(Sweden) Oliver Eriksson	Ford Fiesta
2021	RX1	(Norway) Thomas Bryntesson	Volkswagen Polo
2021	RX3	(Switzerland) Yury Belevskiy	Audi A1
2022	RX1	(Sweden) Anton Marklund	Hyundai i20
2022	RX3	(Norway) Marius Solberg Hansen	Škoda Fabia
2023	RX1	(United Kingdom) Patrick O'Donovan	Peugeot 208
2023	RX2e	(Norway) Ole Henry Steinsholt	ZEROID X1
2023	RX3	(Norway) Espen Isaksætre	Audi A1

=== World Rallycross ===
Year	Division	Driver	Car
2014	Supercars	(Sweden) Mattias Ekström	Audi S1
2015	Supercars	(Sweden) Mattias Ekström	Audi S1
2015	RX Lites	(Norway) Thomas Bryntesson	"Ford Fiesta" RX2
2016	Supercars	(Norway) Andreas Bakkerud	Ford Focus RS
2016	RX Lites	(Sweden) Simon Olofsson	"Ford Fiesta" RX2
2017	Supercars	(Sweden) Johan Kristoffersson	Volkswagen Polo GTI
2017	RX2	(United Kingdom) Dan Rooke	"Ford Fiesta" RX2
2018	Supercars	(Sweden) Johan Kristoffersson	Volkswagen Polo GTI
2018	RX2	(Belgium) Guillaume De Ridder	"Ford Fiesta" RX2
2019	Supercars	(Sweden) Sebastian Eriksson	Ford Fiesta Mk8
2019	RX2	(Norway) Ben-Philip Gundersen	"Ford Fiesta" RX2
2020	Supercars Round 1	(Sweden) Johan Kristoffersson	Volkswagen Polo GTI
2020	Supercars Round 2	(Sweden) Mattias Ekström	Audi S1
2021	RX1	(Sweden) Timmy Hansen	Peugeot 208
2021	RX2e	(Finland) Jesse Kallio	OMSE QEV RX2e
2023	RX1e	(Sweden) Johan Kristoffersson	Volkswagen Polo RX1e
