= Reinis Nitišs =

Latvian rallycross driver

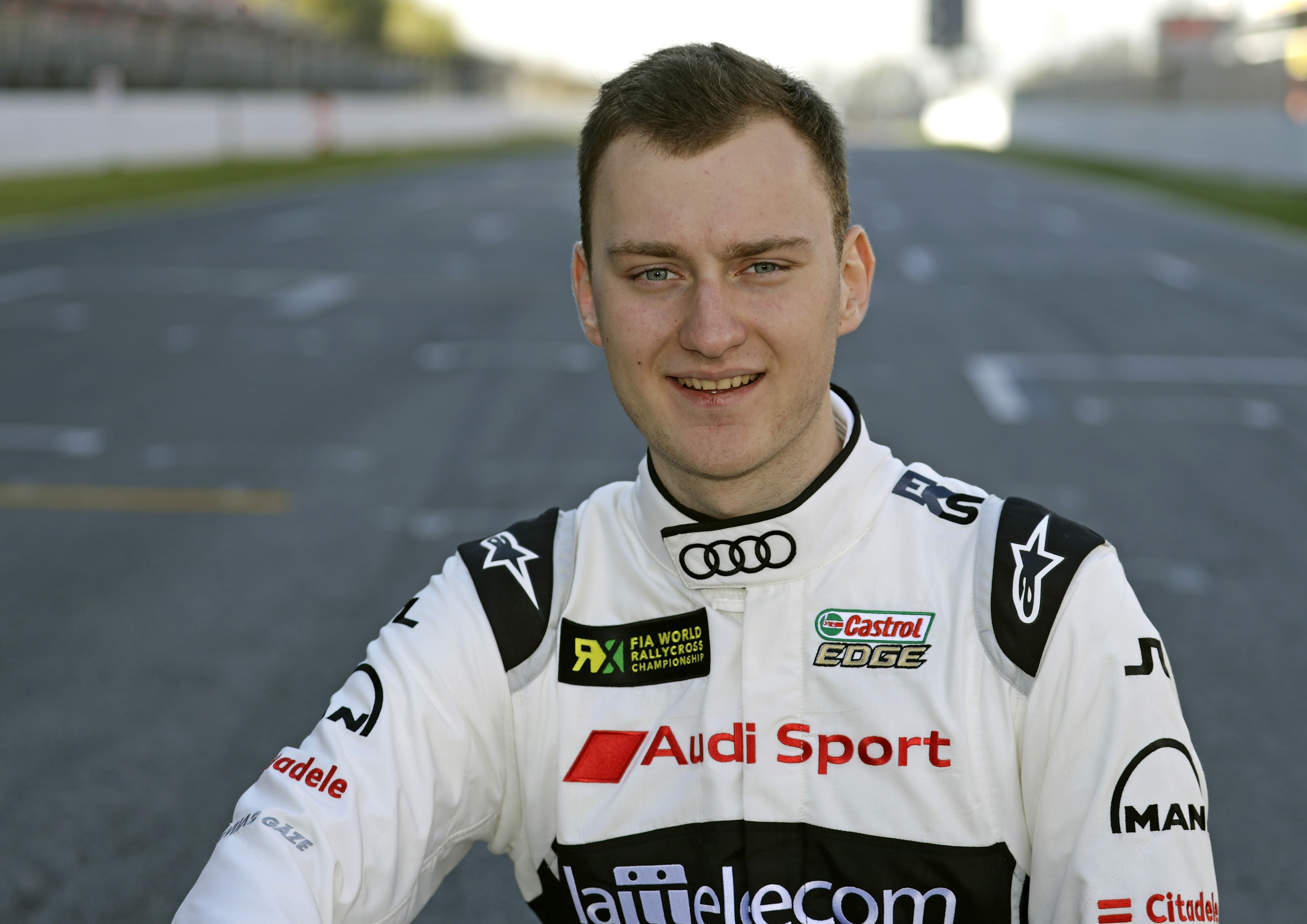
- Nitišs at the 2017 World RX of Barcelona
- Nationality: (Latvia) Latvian
- Born: 16 December 1995 (age 30) Jēkabpils, Latvia

FIA ERX Supercar Championship career
- Debut season: 2018
- Current team: Set Promotion
- Starts: 5
- Championships: 1 (2018)
- Wins: 3
- Podiums: 4

FIA World Rallycross Championship
- Years active: 2014–2017, 2019-2020
- Former teams: Olsbergs MSE; Münnich Motorsport; EKS RX; GRX SET; ESmotorsport-Eigesa WRX Team
- Starts: 53
- Wins: 1
- Podiums: 8
- Best finish: 3rd in 2014

FIA ERX Super1600 Championship
- Years active: 2012–2013
- Former teams: Set Promotion; SKN Sports
- Starts: 14
- Championships: 1 (2013)
- Wins: 6
- Podiums: 8

Championship titles
- 2013 2012 2011 2011 2009 2009: European Rallycross Championship (Super1600); NEZ Rallycross Championship; Estonian Rallycross Championship; Baltic Rallycross Championship; Latvian Karting Championship; Baltic Karting Championship

Reinis Nitišs (born 16 December 1995) is a Latvian rallycross driver from Jēkabpils, Latvia. He is a two-time winner of the European Rallycross Championship, winning the Super1600 division in 2013 and the Supercar division in 2018. He is the youngest event winner in FIA World Rallycross Championship history.

== Biography ==
=== Early career ===
Nitišs started racing go-karts at the age of seven and was quickly successful having won multiple Latvian national titles and the Baltic series by 13. He moved into rallycross and dominated the Baltic and NEZ championships before moving into the European Super1600 category in 2012. The 2013 season brought about a very successful period in which he won 6 out of 9 events on his way to the title.

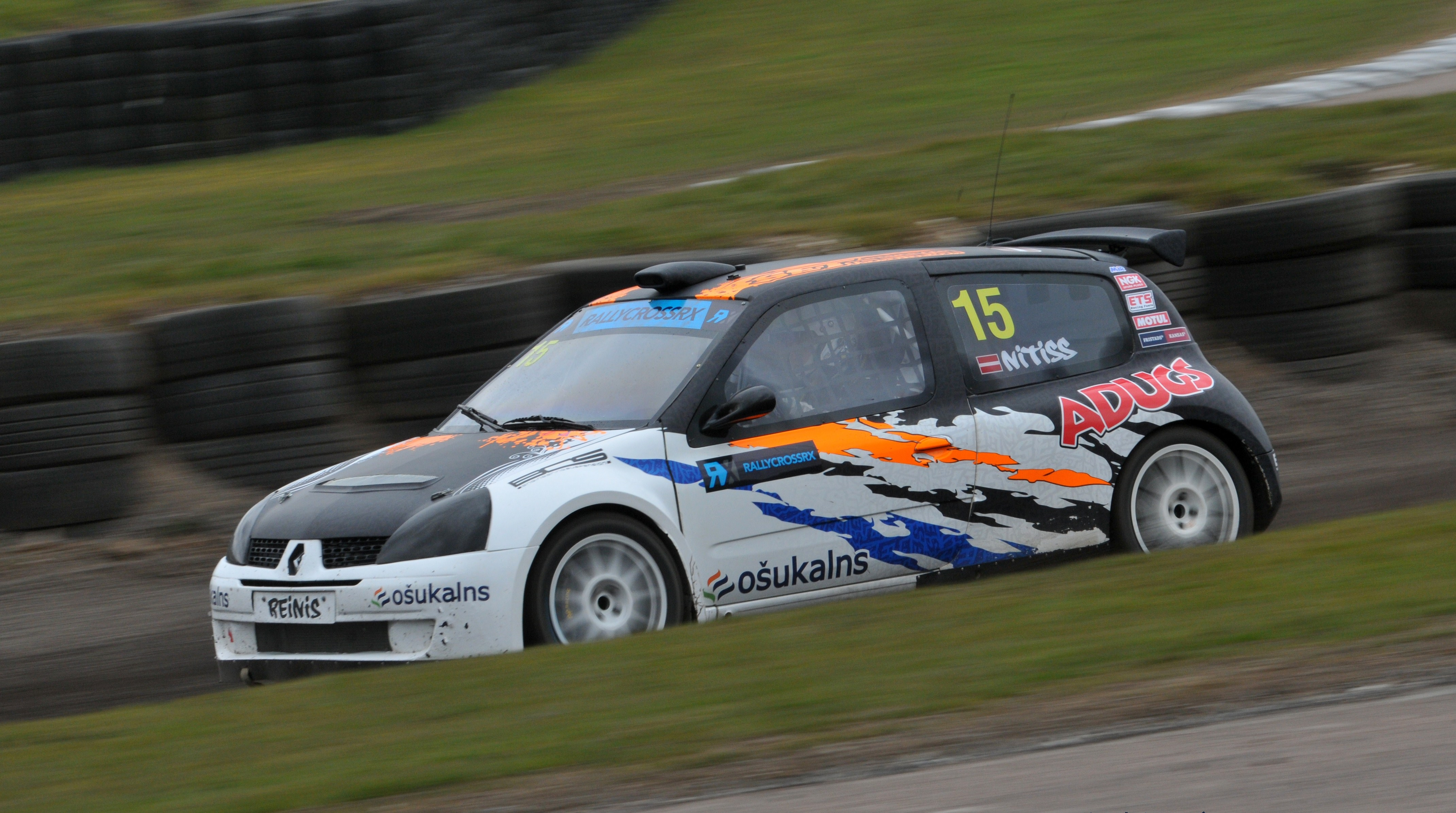
Nitišs racing in the Super1600 category (2013)

=== World Rallycross ===
Olsbergs MSE (2014–15)

In 2014, Nitišs debuted in the FIA World Rallycross Championship Supercar category, driving a Ford Fiesta for Olsbergs MSE (OMSE) alongside Andreas Bakkerud. His career started promisingly, with a semi-final win and ultimately a podium finish in his first race, followed by qualification for the final in his second - which he later failed to take part in due to engine failure. His third event in Norway brought his first and so far only win in World Rallycross. A further three podiums and points finishes in every round cemented third place in the standings at seasons' end behind Petter Solberg and Toomas Heikkinen.

Despite staying with OMSE, 2015 was a much tougher year for Nitišs - the highlights being second in Hockenheim and third in Belgium. He failed to qualify for the semi-finals twice and despite once again finishing every round in the points he finished seventh in the standings compared to Bakkerud in fourth with over two events worth of points in hand.

Münnich Motorsport (2016)

For 2016, Nitišs switched to German outfit Münnich Motorsport and their brand new SEAT Ibiza Supercar. The first half of the season was challenging for him, with the new car's unreliability restricting him to two semi-final appearances. Following the initial struggle, Nitišs ultimately quit the team effective after the French round, despite reaching the final there.

Return to Olsbergs MSE (2016)

Nitišs returned to OMSE for three of the final four rounds, skipping Germany to allow the team to give RX Lites title winner Cyril Raymond a run in a Supercar. He made the semi-finals twice, at his inaugural home round in Latvia as well as Argentina.

Audi Sport EKS RX (2017)

On 20 February 2017, it was announced that Nitišs would move to reigning champions Audi Sport EKS RX for the 2017 season. The move will see the Latvian driving a third car which, under the current rules, is ineligible to score teams' championship points.

== Racing record ==
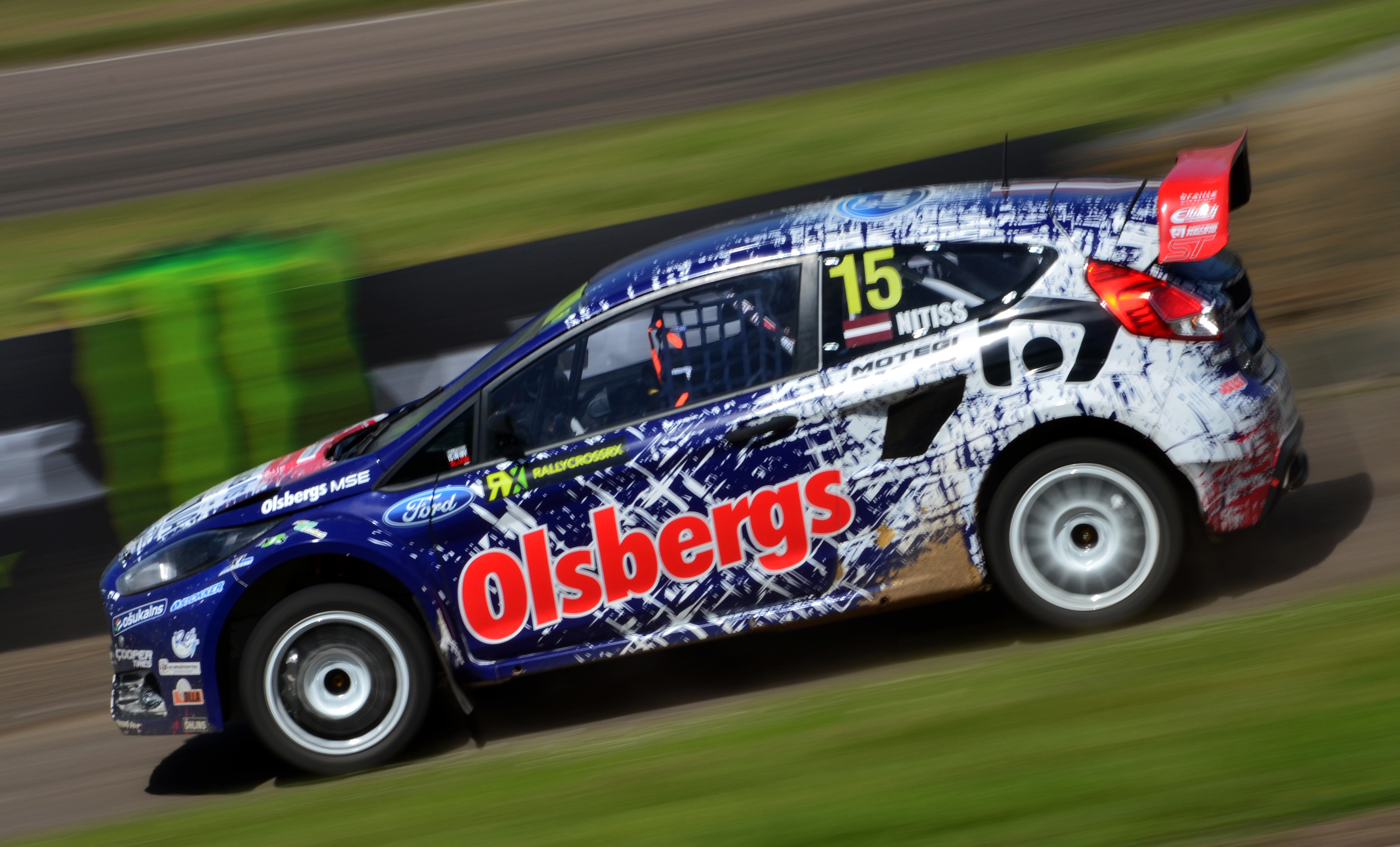
Nitišs in action during the 2014 World RX of Great Britain

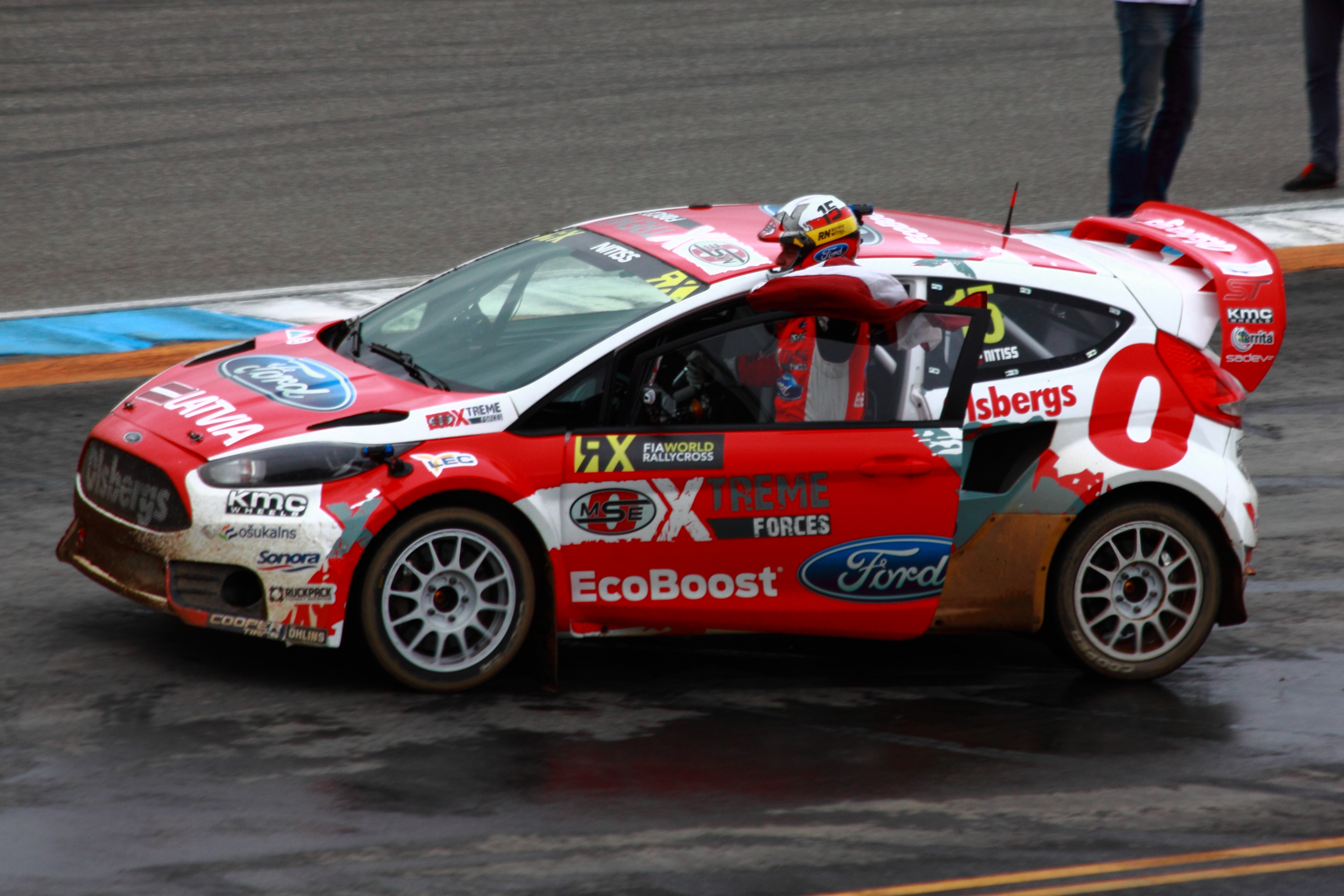
Nitišs at the 2015 World RX of Hockenheim

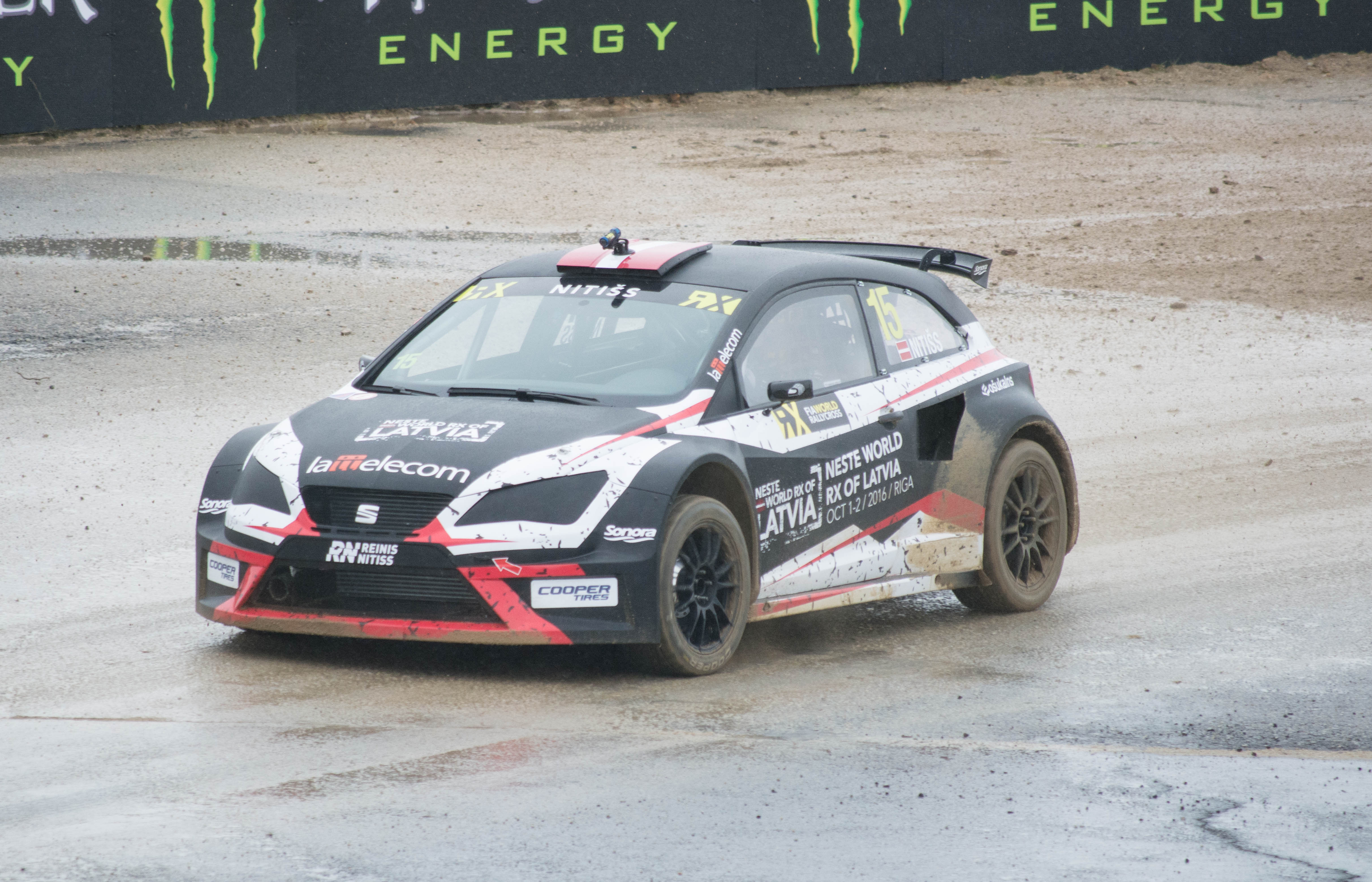
Nitišs competing in the 2016 World RX of Portugal

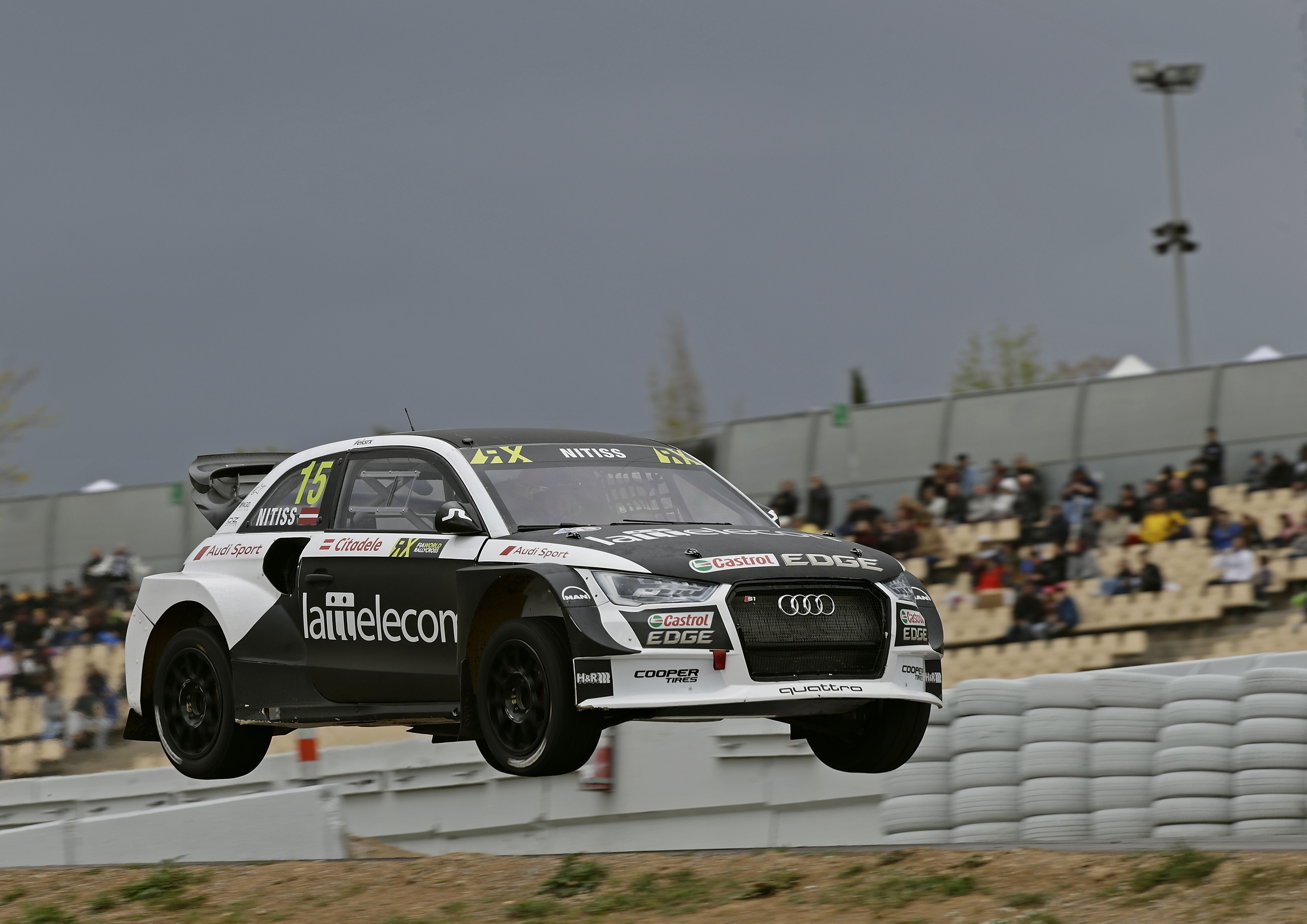
Nitišs in his debut for EKS RX

=== Complete FIA North European Zone (NEZ) Rallycross Championship results ===
(key)

==== NEZ-1600 ====
| Year | Entrant | Car | 1 | 2 | 3 | 4 | Position | Points |
|---|---|---|---|---|---|---|---|---|
| 2012 | SKN Sports | Peugeot 206 | DEN; 2 | NOR; 1 | LTU1; 1 | LTU2; 4 | 1st | 70 |

=== Complete FIA European Rallycross Championship results ===
(key)

==== Super1600 ====
| Year | Entrant | Car | 1 | 2 | 3 | 4 | 5 | 6 | 7 | 8 | 9 | 10 | ERX | Points |
|---|---|---|---|---|---|---|---|---|---|---|---|---|---|---|
| 2012 | SKN Sports | Peugeot 206 | GBR | FRA | AUT | HUN | NOR | SWE (16) | BEL; 16 | NED; 14 | FIN; 12 | GER; 15 | 23rd | 11 |
| 2013 | SET Promotion | Renault Clio | GBR; 6 | POR; 4 | HUN; 1 | FIN; 1 | NOR; 1 | SWE; 2 | FRA; 1 | AUT; 1 | GER; 1 | | 1st | 227 |

==== Supercar ====
| Year | Entrant | Car | 1 | 2 | 3 | 4 | 5 | ERX | Points |
|---|---|---|---|---|---|---|---|---|---|
| 2018 | Set Promotion | Ford Fiesta | BAR; 1 | BEL; 2 | SWE; 1 | FRA; 6 | LAT; 1 | 1st | 135 |

=== Complete FIA World Rallycross Championship results ===
(key)

==== Supercar ====
| Year | Entrant | Car | 1 | 2 | 3 | 4 | 5 | 6 | 7 | 8 | 9 | 10 | 11 | 12 | 13 | WRX | Points |
|---|---|---|---|---|---|---|---|---|---|---|---|---|---|---|---|---|---|
| 2014 | Ford Olsbergs MSE | Ford Fiesta ST | POR; 3 | GBR; 7 | NOR; 1 | FIN; 3 | SWE; 4 | BEL; 8 | CAN; 4 | FRA; 2 | GER; 16 | ITA; 11 | TUR; 7 | ARG; 2 | | 3rd | 210 |
| 2015 | Olsbergs MSE | Ford Fiesta ST | POR; 11 | HOC; 2 | BEL; 3 | GBR; 5 | GER; 7 | SWE; 5 | CAN; 9 | NOR; 7 | FRA; 16 | BAR; 9 | TUR; 7 | ITA; 9 | ARG; 14 | 7th | 167 |
| 2016 | all-inkl.com Münnich Motorsport | SEAT Ibiza | POR; 15 | HOC; 13 | BEL; 12 | GBR; 21 | NOR; 12 | SWE; 18 | CAN; 13 | FRA; 5 | | | | | | 16th | 44 |
| 2016 | Olsbergs MSE | Ford Fiesta | | | | | | | | | BAR; 13 | LAT; 11 | GER | ARG; 10 | | 16th | 44 |
| 2017 | EKS RX | Audi S1 | BAR; 10 | POR; 5 | HOC; 12 | BEL; 13 | GBR; 16 | NOR; 10 | SWE; 18 | CAN; 16 | FRA; 12 | LAT; 11 | GER; 12 | RSA; 18 | | 14th | 71 |
| 2019 | GRX SET | Hyundai i20 | ABU; 11 | BAR | BEL | GBR | NOR | SWE; 3 | CAN | FRA | LAT; 8 | RSA | | | | 14th | 40 |
| 2020 | ESmotorsport-Eigesa WRX Team | Škoda Fabia | SWE | SWE | FIN | FIN | LAT; 11 | LAT; 13 | ESP | ESP | | | | | | 19th | 12 |

=== Complete Global RallyCross Championship results ===
(key)

==== GRC Lites ====
| Year | Entrant | Car | 1 | 2 | 3 | 4 | 5 | 6 | 7 | 8 | 9 | GRC | Points |
|---|---|---|---|---|---|---|---|---|---|---|---|---|---|
| 2013 | Olsbergs MSE | Lites Ford Fiesta | BRA | MUN1 | MUN2 | LOU | BRI | IRW; 5 | ATL; 6 | CHA | LV | 10th | 23 |

== Records ==
- Youngest winner in World Rallycross Supercars, at 18 years and 6 months.
- First WRX event winner from outside Scandinavia.
- First WRX event winner from the Baltic states.

Sporting positions
| Preceded by Andreas Bakkerud | European Rallycross Super1600 Champion; 2013 | Succeeded by Sergey Zagumennov |
| Preceded by Anton Marklund | European Rallycross Supercar Champion; 2018 | Succeeded by Incumbent |
