= Kevin Abbring =

Dutch rally driver (born 1989)

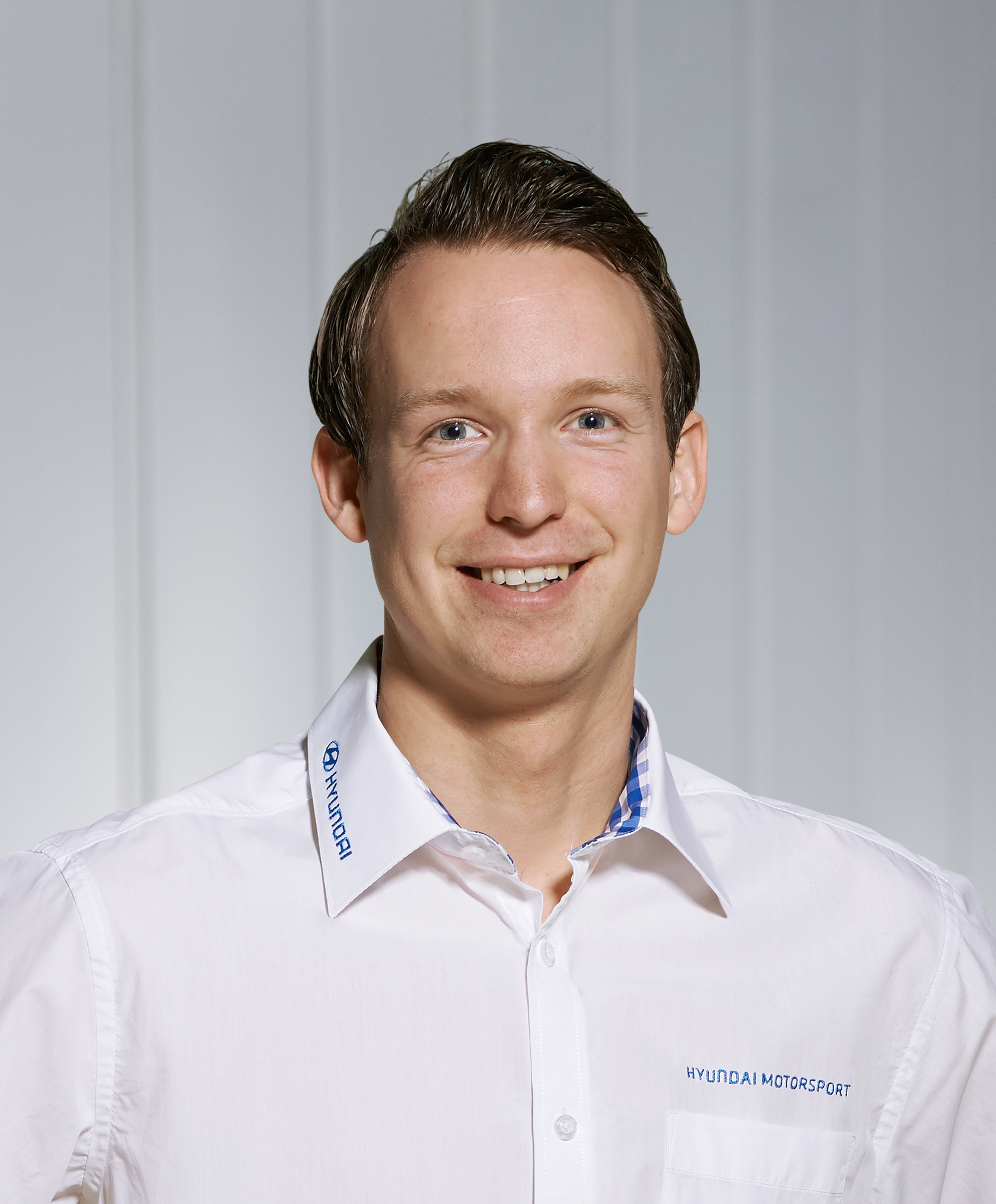
- Kevin Abbring in 2013

Personal information
- Nationality: (Netherlands) Dutch
- Born: 20 January 1989 (age 37)

World Rally Championship record
- Years active: 2007–2012, 2014–2018, 2020–2021
- Co-driver: (Netherlands) Harmen Scholtalbers (Belgium) Erwin Mombaerts (Belgium) Bjorn Degandt (Belgium) Lara Vanneste (Belgium) Frédéric Micoltte (United Kingdom) Sebastian Marshall (Belgium) Martijn Wydaeghe (Belgium) Pieter Tsjoen
- Teams: KNAF Talent First, Hyundai
- Rallies: 39
- Championships: 0
- Rally wins: 0
- Podiums: 0
- Stage wins: 1
- Total points: 10
- First rally: 2007 Rallye Deutschland
- Last rally: 2021 Monte Carlo Rally

Kevin Abbring (born 20 January 1989) is a Dutch rally driver. His father, Edwin Abbring, is also a well-known former rally driver.

== Career ==
Abbring started his motorsport career in Rallycross with a 60 bhp strong buggy for newcomers, winning the 2005 and 2006 titles of the Dutch Ford RST series. In 2007 he competed in the Dutch Rally Championship with a Mitsubishi Colt. He also made his World Rally Championship debut in a Mitsubishi Lancer Evolution IX. In 2008 he began competing in the Junior World Rally Championship in a Renault Clio R3, with backing from KNAF Talent First. He took his first JWRC win on the 2009 Rally Poland, on his way to fourth in the final standings for 2009. In 2010 he won the JWRC in Portugal. He has also competed in the Intercontinental Rally Challenge, winning the 2WD category in Ypres and Zlín. In October 2011 Abbring won the Driver of the academy award for the inaugural FIA Institute Young Driver Excellence Academy.

After a successful trial rally for Volkswagen Motorsport driving a Škoda Fabia S2000 car at 2011 Wales Rally GB, Abbring signed with Volkswagen for the 2012 WRC season driving one of their Fabia's, sharing the second seat alongside Sebastien Ogier with Andreas Mikkelsen. Sadly, he was offered very few outings by VW in 2012 and didn't rally in the WRC at all in 2013.

In 2013, Abbring won the French Peugeot 208 Rally Cup, leading to Peugeot Sport offering him a drive in the European Rally Championship in their new Peugeot 208 T16 R5 car.

Plagued with technical issues, Abbring took the lead in 5 ERC events, but was forced to retire with engine trouble on all event except Azores, (where he finished 2nd after falling back from the lead with mechanical issues) and the Tour de Corse, where he finished 3rd.

In January 2015, it was announced Abbring would be the main testdriver for Hyundai Motorsport in the World Rally Championship. While his main focus would be the development of the new Hyundai i20 WRC, Abbring and Seb Marshall were also entered on selected WRC events later in the year.

Abbring took his first stage win and first points at the 2016 13º Rally d'Italia Sardinia. He won his first international rally at the wheel of a Hyundai i20 R5 at the French Rallye du Var in 2016. In 2017, he was the first Dutchman ever to win the biggest rally of Belgium, the Ypres Rally, at the wheel of a Peugeot 208 R5.

== Results ==
=== Complete FIA World Rallycross Championship results ===
(key)

==== Supercar/RX1 ====
Year	Entrant	Car	1	2	3	4	5	6	7	8	9	WRX	Points	
2019	ES Motorsport-Labas GAS	Škoda Fabia	UAE	BAR	BEL	GBR	NOR; 4	SWE; 4	CAN	FRA	LAT	RSA	16th	35
2020	GCK UNKORRUPTED	Renault Clio R.S. RX	SWE	SWE	FIN; 17	FIN; 13	LAT	LAT	ESP	ESP			25th	4
2021	Unkorrupted	Renault Mégane R.S.	BAR; 6	SWE; 3	FRA; 4	LAT; 8	LAT; 8	BEL; 7	PRT	GER	GER		7th	97

=== WRC results ===
Year	Entrant	Car	1	2	3	4	5	6	7	8	9	10	11	12	13	14	15	16	WDC	Points
2007	KNAF Talent First	Mitsubishi Lancer Evo VII	MON	SWE	NOR	MEX	POR	ARG	ITA	GRE	FIN	GER; 41	NZL	ESP	FRA	JPN	IRE	GBR	NC	0
2008	KNAF Talent First	Renault Clio R3	MON	SWE	MEX	ARG	JOR; Ret	ITA; Ret	GRE	TUR	FIN; 33	GER; 34	NZL	ESP; 40	FRA; 30	JPN	GBR		NC	0
2009	KNAF Talent First	Renault Clio R3	IRE; 22	NOR	CYP	POR; 19	ARG	ITA; Ret	GRE	POL; 11	FIN; Ret	AUS	ESP; 27	GBR					NC	0
2010	KNAF Talent First	Renault Clio R3	SWE	MEX	JOR	TUR; 15	NZL	POR; 21	BUL; 21	FIN	GER; Ret	JPN	FRA; Ret	ESP	GBR				NC	0
2011	Volkswagen Motorsport	Škoda Fabia S2000	SWE	MEX	POR	JOR	ITA	ARG	GRE	FIN	GER	AUS	FRA	ESP	GBR; 12				NC	0
2012	Volkswagen Motorsport	Škoda Fabia S2000	MON; 12	SWE	MEX; Ret	POR; DNS	ARG	GRE	NZL	FIN	GER	GBR; 25	FRA	ITA	ESP				NC	0
2014	Peugeot Rally Academy	Peugeot 208 T16	MON	SWE	MEX	POR	ARG	ITA	POL	FIN	GER	AUS	FRA; 14	ESP	GBR				NC	0
2015	Hyundai Motorsport N	Hyundai i20 WRC	MON	SWE; 11	MEX	ARG	POR	ITA	POL; 15	FIN	GER; 11	AUS	FRA; Ret	ESP	GBR				NC	0
2016	Hyundai Motorsport N	Hyundai i20 WRC	MON	SWE	MEX	ARG	POR; Ret	ITA; 15	POL	FIN; 9	GER	CHN; C		ESP; 7		AUS			16th	10
2016	Hyundai Motorsport N	Hyundai i20 R5											FRA; Ret		GBR; Ret				16th	10
2017	Hyundai Motorsport N	Hyundai i20 R5	MON; 31	SWE	MEX	FRA	ARG	POR	ITA	POL	FIN	GER	ESP	GBR	AUS				NC	0
2018	Kevin Abbring	Ford Fiesta R5	MON; Ret	SWE; Ret	MEX	FRA	ARG	POR; Ret	ITA	FIN	GER	TUR	GBR	ESP	AUS				NC	0
2020	Kevin Abbring	Volkswagen Polo GTI R5	MON	SWE	MEX	EST	TUR	ITA	MNZ; 15										NC	0
2021	Pieter Tsjoen	Volkswagen Polo GTI R5	MON; 20	ARC	CRO	POR	ITA	KEN	EST	BEL	GRE	FIN	ESP	MNZ					NC	0

=== WRC-2 results ===
Year	Entrant	Car	1	2	3	4	5	6	7	8	9	10	11	12	13	14	Pos.	Points
2016	Hyundai Motorsport N	Hyundai i20 R5	MON	SWE	MEX	ARG	POR	ITA	POL	FIN	GER	CHN; C	FRA; Ret	ESP	GBR; Ret	AUS	NC	0
2018	Kevin Abbring	Ford Fiesta R5	MON; Ret	SWE; Ret	MEX	FRA	ARG	POR; Ret	ITA	FIN	GER	TUR	GBR	ESP	AUS		NC	0

=== JWRC results ===
Year	Entrant	Car	1	2	3	4	5	6	7	8	JWRC	Points
2008	Knaf Talent First	Renault Clio R3	MEX	JOR; Ret	ITA; Ret	FIN; 6	GER; 6	ESP; 11	FRA; 8		13th	7
2009	Knaf Talent First	Renault Clio R3	IRE; 5	CYP	POR; 2	ARG	ITA; Ret	POL; 1	FIN; Ret	ESP; 4	4th	27
2010	Knaf Talent First	Renault Clio R3	TUR; 3	POR; 1	BUL; 7	GER; Ret	FRA; Ret	ESP			5th	46

=== ERC results ===
Year	Entrant	Car	1	2	3	4	5	6	7	8	9	10	11	12	Pos.	Points
2014	Peugeot Rally Academy	Peugeot 208 T16	AUT	LVA	GRC; Ret	GBR; Ret	PRT; 2	BEL; Ret	EST	CZE; Ret	CYP	ROU	CHE; Ret	FRA; 3	6	63

=== Overall rally victories ===
Year	Event	Car	Championship
2016	(France) Rallye du Var	Hyundai i20 R5	French
2017	(Belgium) Rallye de Wallonie	Peugeot 208 R5	Belgian
2017	(Belgium) Ypres Rally	Peugeot 208 R5	TER, Belgian, British
