= 2020 World RX of Catalunya =

Rallycross championship event

- Round 7 of 8 in the 2020 FIA World Rallycross Championship
- Date: 17 October 2020
- Location: Montmeló, Catalonia
- Venue: Circuit de Barcelona-Catalunya

Results
Heat winners
- Heat 1: (Sweden) Johan Kristoffersson; Kristoffersson Motorsport
- Heat 2: (Norway) Andreas Bakkerud; Monster Energy GCK RX Cartel
- Heat 3: (Sweden) Johan Kristoffersson; Kristoffersson Motorsport
Semi-final winners
- Semi-final 1: (Sweden) Johan Kristoffersson; Kristoffersson Motorsport
- Semi-final 2: (Sweden) Timmy Hansen; Team Hansen
Final
- First: (Sweden) Timmy Hansen; Team Hansen
- Second: (Sweden) Johan Kristoffersson; Kristoffersson Motorsport
- Third: (Sweden) Kevin Hansen; Team Hansen

Rallycross layout of the Circuit de Catalunya

2020 World RX of Catalunya
- Round 8 of 8 in the 2020 FIA World Rallycross Championship
- Date: 18 October 2020
- Location: Montmeló, Catalonia
- Venue: Circuit de Barcelona-Catalunya

Results
Heat winners
- Heat 1: (Sweden) Mattias Ekström; KYB Team JC
- Heat 2: (Sweden) Mattias Ekström; KYB Team JC
- Heat 3: (Norway) Andreas Bakkerud; Monster Energy GCK RX Cartel
Semi-final winners
- Semi-final 1: (Sweden) Johan Kristoffersson; Kristoffersson Motorsport
- Semi-final 2: (Norway) Andreas Bakkerud; Monster Energy GCK RX Cartel
Final
- First: (Sweden) Johan Kristoffersson; Kristoffersson Motorsport
- Second: (Sweden) Timmy Hansen; Team Hansen
- Third: (Sweden) Anton Marklund; GCK Bilstein

The 2020 Logitech G World RX of Catalunya was the seventh and eighth round of the seventh season of the FIA World Rallycross Championship. The event was held at the Circuit de Barcelona-Catalunya in Montmeló, Catalonia.

Due to the COVID-19 pandemic, the event became the last double header (two races in a weekend) of season after cancellation of World RX events in Spa and Nurburgring.

== Supercar Race 1 ==
=== Heats ===
Pos.	No.	Driver	Team	Car	Q1	Q2	Q3	Pts
1	3	(Sweden) Johan Kristoffersson	Kristoffersson Motorsport	Volkswagen Polo	1st	2nd	1st	16
2	1	(Sweden) Timmy Hansen	Team Hansen	Peugeot 208	2nd	3rd	2nd	15
3	13	(Norway) Andreas Bakkerud	Monster Energy GCK RX Cartel	Renault Mégane RS	7th	1st	3rd	14
4	9	(Sweden) Kevin Hansen	Team Hansen	Peugeot 208	8th	5th	6th	13
5	5	(Sweden) Mattias Ekström	KYB Team JC	Audi S1	10th	6th	4th	12
6	68	(Finland) Niclas Grönholm	GRX Taneco Team	Hyundai i20	5th	10th	5th	11
7	7	(Russia) Timur Timerzyanov	GRX Taneco Team	Hyundai i20	6th	7th	8th	10
8	92	(Sweden) Anton Marklund	GCK Bilstein	Renault Mégane RS	3rd	9th	10th	9
9	44	(Germany) Timo Scheider	ALL-INKL.COM Münnich Motorsport	Seat Ibiza	16th	4th	7th	8
10	33	(United Kingdom) Liam Doran	Monster Energy GCK RX Cartel	Renault Mégane RS	9th	8th	11th	7
11	42	(United Kingdom) Oliver Bennett	Oliver Bennett	Mini Cooper	11th	12th	14th	6
12	4	(Sweden) Robin Larsson	KYB Team JC	Audi S1	4th	16th	9th	5
13	91	(Belgium) Enzo Ide	Team JC Race Teknik	Audi S1	12th	11th	16th	4
14	73	(Hungary) Tamás Kárai	Karai Motorsport Sportegyesület	Audi S1	13th	15th	12th	3
15	83	(France) Patrick Guillerme	Patrick Guillerme	Hyundai i20	15th	14th	13th	2
16	38	(Germany) Mandie August	ALL-INKL.COM Münnich Motorsport	Seat Ibiza	14th	13th	15th	1

=== Semi-finals ===
Semi-Final 1

Pos.	No.	Driver	Team	Time	Pts
1	3	(Sweden) Johan Kristoffersson	Kristoffersson Motorsport	4:50.133	6
2	5	(Sweden) Mattias Ekström	KYB Team JC	+ 2.666	5
3	13	(Norway) Andreas Bakkerud	Monster Energy GCK RX Cartel	+ 3.550	4
4	7	(Russia) Timur Timerzyanov	GRX Taneco Team	+ 4.443	3
5	42	(United Kingdom) Oliver Bennett	Oliver Bennett	+ 10.694	2
6	44	(Germany) Timo Scheider	ALL-INKL.COM Münnich Motorsport	DNF	1

Semi-Final 2

Pos.	No.	Driver	Team	Time	Pts
1	1	(Sweden) Timmy Hansen	Team Hansen	4:49.427	6
2	9	(Sweden) Kevin Hansen	Team Hansen	+ 0.587	5
3	68	(Finland) Niclas Grönholm	GRX Taneco Team	+ 2.109	4
4	92	(Sweden) Anton Marklund	GCK Bilstein	+ 3.114	3
5	4	(Sweden) Robin Larsson	KYB Team JC	+ 3.506	2
6	33	(United Kingdom) Liam Doran	Monster Energy GCK RX Cartel	+ 11.132	1

=== Final ===
Pos.	No.	Driver	Team	Time	Pts
1	1	(Sweden) Timmy Hansen	Team Hansen	4:47.809	8
2	3	(Sweden) Johan Kristoffersson	Kristoffersson Motorsport	+ 0.417	5
3	9	(Sweden) Kevin Hansen	Team Hansen	+ 2.030	4
4	68	(Finland) Niclas Grönholm	GRX Taneco Team	+ 2.978	3
5	5	(Sweden) Mattias Ekström	KYB Team JC	+ 3.422	2
6	13	(Norway) Andreas Bakkerud	Monster Energy GCK RX Cartel	+ 4.407	1

== Supercar Race 2 ==
=== Heats ===
Pos.	No.	Driver	Team	Car	Q1	Q2	Q3	Pts
1	5	(Sweden) Mattias Ekström	KYB Team JC	Audi S1	1st	1st	4th	16
2	13	(Norway) Andreas Bakkerud	Monster Energy GCK RX Cartel	Renault Mégane RS	5th	3rd	1st	15
3	9	(Sweden) Kevin Hansen	Team Hansen	Peugeot 208	4th	2nd	2nd	14
4	1	(Sweden) Timmy Hansen	Team Hansen	Peugeot 208	2nd	5th	5th	13
5	3	(Sweden) Johan Kristoffersson	Kristoffersson Motorsport	Volkswagen Polo	6th	4th	6th	12
6	92	(Sweden) Anton Marklund	GCK Bilstein	Renault Mégane RS	10th	6th	3rd	11
7	4	(Sweden) Robin Larsson	KYB Team JC	Audi S1	3rd	4th	7th	10
8	68	(Finland) Niclas Grönholm	GRX Taneco Team	Hyundai i20	8th	7th	9th	9
9	44	(Germany) Timo Scheider	ALL-INKL.COM Münnich Motorsport	Seat Ibiza	9th	8th	8th	8
10	7	(Russia) Timur Timerzyanov	GRX Taneco Team	Hyundai i20	7th	9th	10th	7
11	73	(Hungary) Tamás Kárai	Karai Motorsport Sportegyesület	Audi S1	12th	10th	11th	6
12	91	(Belgium) Enzo Ide	Team JC Race Teknik	Audi S1	11th	16th	12th	5
13	38	(Germany) Mandie August	ALL-INKL.COM Münnich Motorsport	Seat Ibiza	14th	13th	15th	4
14	42	(United Kingdom) Oliver Bennett	Oliver Bennett	Mini Cooper	16th	11th	15th	3
15	83	(France) Patrick Guillerme	Patrick Guillerme	Hyundai i20	15th	15th	14th	2
10	33	(United Kingdom) Liam Doran	Monster Energy GCK RX Cartel	Renault Mégane RS	13th	12th	DNS	1

=== Semi-finals ===
Semi-Final 1

Pos.	No.	Driver	Team	Time	Pts
1	3	(Sweden) Johan Kristoffersson	Kristoffersson Motorsport	4:43.040	6
2	5	(Sweden) Mattias Ekström	KYB Team JC	+ 1.380	5
3	4	(Sweden) Robin Larsson	KYB Team JC	+ 4.314	4
4	9	(Sweden) Kevin Hansen	Team Hansen	+ 5.253	3
5	44	(Germany) Timo Scheider	ALL-INKL.COM Münnich Motorsport	+ 10.903	2
6	73	(Hungary) Tamás Kárai	Karai Motorsport Sportegyesület	+ 13.577	1

Semi-Final 2

Pos.	No.	Driver	Team	Time	Pts
1	13	(Norway) Andreas Bakkerud	Monster Energy GCK RX Cartel	4:43.087	6
2	1	(Sweden) Timmy Hansen	Team Hansen	+ 0.478	5
3	92	(Sweden) Anton Marklund	GCK Bilstein	+ 1.818	4
4	68	(Finland) Niclas Grönholm	GRX Taneco Team	+ 2.567	3
5	7	(Russia) Timur Timerzyanov	GRX Taneco Team	+ 3.089	2
6	91	(Belgium) Enzo Ide	Team JC Race Teknik	+ 8.331	1

=== Final ===
Pos.	No.	Driver	Team	Time	Pts
1	3	(Sweden) Johan Kristoffersson	Kristoffersson Motorsport	4:39.638	8
2	1	(Sweden) Timmy Hansen	Team Hansen	+ 2.737	5
3	92	(Sweden) Anton Marklund	GCK Bilstein	+ 5.002	4
4	5	(Sweden) Mattias Ekström	KYB Team JC	+ 19.397	3
5	13	(Norway) Andreas Bakkerud	Monster Energy GCK RX Cartel	DNF	2
6	68	(Sweden) Robin Larsson	KYB Team JC	DNF	1

== Standings after the event ==
Pos.	Driver	Pts	Gap
WC	(Sweden) Johan Kristoffersson	219	
2	(Sweden) Mattias Ekström	192	+27
3	(Sweden) Timmy Hansen	163	+56
4	(Finland) Niclas Grönholm	147	+72
5	(Sweden) Kevin Hansen	135	+84
6	(Sweden) Robin Larsson	122	+97

- Note: Only the top six positions are included.

Previous race: 2020 World RX of Riga-Latvia	FIA World Rallycross Championship; 2020 season	Next race: 2021 World RX of Barcelona-Catalunya
Previous race: 2019 World RX of Catalunya	World RX of Catalunya	Next race: 2021 World RX of Barcelona-Catalunya
