= 2020 FIA World Rallycross Championship =

Auto racing competition

The 2020 FIA World Rallycross Championship was the seventh season of the FIA World Rallycross Championship, an auto racing championship recognised by the Fédération Internationale de l'Automobile (FIA) as the highest class of international rallycross.

Johan Kristoffersson won the Drivers' Championship for the third time. KYB Team JC won the Teams' Championship.

== Calendar ==
The 2020 championship was contested over eight rounds in Europe. The season was originally scheduled to start in April but following multiple postponements relating to the COVID-19 pandemic, a revised calendar was released in May 2020 and the championship finally began in August.

Rnd.	Event	Dates	Venue	Class	Winner	Team	Report
1	Swecon World RX of Sweden	22–23 August	Höljesbanan, Höljes	Supercar	(Sweden) Johan Kristoffersson	(Sweden) Volkswagen Dealerteam BAUHAUS	Report
2	Swecon World RX of Sweden	22–23 August	Höljesbanan, Höljes	Supercar	(Sweden) Mattias Ekström	(Sweden) KYB Team JC	Report
2	Swecon World RX of Sweden	22–23 August	Höljesbanan, Höljes	Projekt E	(United States) Ken Block	(United States) Hoonigan Racing Division	Report
3	Capitalbox World RX of Finland	29 August	Tykkimäki, Kouvola	Supercar	(Sweden) Johan Kristoffersson	(Sweden) Volkswagen Dealerteam BAUHAUS	Report
4	Capitalbox World RX of Finland	30 August	Tykkimäki, Kouvola	Supercar	(Finland) Niclas Grönholm	(Finland) GRX Taneco	Report
N/C	(Denmark) RX2 All Star Shootout	5 September	Nysumbanen, Vebbestrup	RX2	(Belgium) Guillaume De Ridder	(Sweden) Olsbergs MSE	Report
N/C	(Denmark) RX2 All Star Shootout	6 September	Nysumbanen, Vebbestrup	RX2	(Norway) Henrik Krogstad	(Sweden) Yellow Squad Team Färén	Report
5	Neste World RX of Riga-Latvia	19–20 September	Biķernieku Kompleksā Sporta Bāze, Riga	Supercar	(Sweden) Johan Kristoffersson	(Sweden) Volkswagen Dealerteam BAUHAUS	Report
6	Neste World RX of Riga-Latvia	19–20 September	Biķernieku Kompleksā Sporta Bāze, Riga	Supercar	(Sweden) Mattias Ekström	(Sweden) KYB Team JC	Report
6	Neste World RX of Riga-Latvia	19–20 September	Biķernieku Kompleksā Sporta Bāze, Riga	Projekt E	(France) Cyril Raymond	(France) Citroën Racing	Report
7	(Spain) Logitech G World RX of Catalunya	17 October	Circuit de Barcelona-Catalunya, Montmeló	Supercar	(Sweden) Timmy Hansen	(Sweden) Team Hansen	Report
8	(Spain) Logitech G World RX of Catalunya	18 October	Circuit de Barcelona-Catalunya, Montmeló	Supercar	(Sweden) Johan Kristoffersson	(Sweden) Volkswagen Dealerteam BAUHAUS	Report
	Event		Venue		Original Dates		
	World RX of Portugal		Pista Automóvel de Montalegre, Montalegre		2–3 May then 10–11 October		
	(Belgium) World RX of Benelux		Circuit de Spa-Francorchamps, Spa-Francorchamps		16–17 May then 3–4 October then 21–22 November		
	World RX of Norway		Lånkebanen, Hell		13–14 June		
	World RX of Russia		Igora Drive, Sosnovo		18–19 July		
	World RX of Germany		Nürburgring, Nürburg		1–2 August then 12–13 December		
	World RX of France		Circuit de Lohéac, Lohéac		5–6 September		
	(United Arab Emirates) World RX of Abu Dhabi		Yas Marina Circuit, Abu Dhabi		29–31 October		
	World RX of South Africa		Killarney Motor Racing Complex, Cape Town		14–15 November		

=== Calendar changes ===
- The World RX of Portugal and World RX of Germany would both have returned after a one-year hiatus. The German round would have moved from the Estering to the Nürburgring. Both events were later cancelled.
- The World RX of Canada and the World RX of Great Britain were both removed from the schedule.
- The World RX of Russia was added to the schedule, but had been cancelled.
- The World RX of Barcelona - Catalunya, World RX of Portugal, World RX of Benelux, World RX of Sweden, World RX of Germany were all scheduled to take place between April and August. All were rescheduled as a result of the COVID-19 pandemic.
- The World RX of Norway and World RX of South Africa were both dropped from the calendar following the May calendar revision.
- The World RX of France was cancelled, also as a result of the COVID-19 pandemic.
- A new event was added to the calendar, after the extraordinary World Motor Sport Council in June, in Kouvola (Finland) to replace the World RX of France.
- The World RX of Benelux was rescheduled for a second time to November to allow a larger number of spectators to attend.
- On September 15, the organization of World RX of Portugal announced that the event was cancelled due to the evolution of COVID-19 in September.
- On November 4, it was announced that the World RX of Benelux was cancelled due to spikes in COVID-19 cases in Belgium.
- On November 26, it was announced that the World RX of Germany was cancelled, due to spikes in COVID-19 cases in Germany, resulting in an early end to the 2020 season

== Entries ==
=== Supercar ===
Constructor	Team	Car	No.	Drivers	Rounds	Ref.
Audi	(Sweden) KYB Team JC	Audi S1 RX	4	(Sweden) Robin Larsson	All	
Audi	(Sweden) KYB Team JC	Audi S1 RX	5	(Sweden) Mattias Ekström	All	
Audi	(Hungary) Karai Motorsport Sportegyesület	Audi S1 RX	73	(Hungary) Tamás Kárai	3–4, 7–8	
Audi	(Sweden) Team JC Race Teknik	Audi S1 RX	91	(Belgium) Enzo Ide	7–8	
Ford	(Finland) Ferratum Team	Ford Fiesta Supercar RX	11	(Finland) Jani Paasonen	1–6	
Ford	(Finland) Jere Kalliokoski	Ford Fiesta Supercar RX	22	(Finland) Jere Kalliokoski	3–4	
Ford	(Finland) Atro Määttä	Ford Fiesta Supercar RX	65	(Finland) Atro Määttä	3–4	
Honda	(Sweden) Olsbergs MSE	Honda Civic Coupe	93	(Sweden) Sebastian Eriksson	1–2	
Hyundai	(Finland) GRX Taneco Team	Hyundai i20	7	(Russia) Timur Timerzyanov	All	
Hyundai	(Finland) GRX Taneco Team	Hyundai i20	68	(Finland) Niclas Grönholm	All	
Hyundai	(France) Patrick Guillerme	Hyundai i20	83	(France) Patrick Guillerme	7–8	
Hyundai	(Finland) GRX Set	Hyundai i20	123	(Hungary) Krisztián Szabó	1–2, 5–6	
Hyundai	(Finland) GRX Set	Hyundai i20	177	(Finland) Juha Rytkönen	3–4	
Mini	(United Kingdom) Oliver Bennett	Mini Cooper SX1	42	(United Kingdom) Oliver Bennett	7–8	
Peugeot	(Sweden) Team Hansen	Peugeot 208 RX	1	(Sweden) Timmy Hansen	All	
Peugeot	(Sweden) Team Hansen	Peugeot 208 RX	9	(Sweden) Kevin Hansen	All	
Renault	(France) GCK UNKORRUPTED	Renault Clio R.S. RX	14	(Lithuania) Rokas Baciuška	1–2, 5–6	
Renault	(France) GCK UNKORRUPTED	Renault Clio R.S. RX	36	(France) Guerlain Chicherit	1–6	
Renault	(France) GCK UNKORRUPTED	Renault Clio R.S. RX	69	(Netherlands) Kevin Abbring	3–4	
Renault	(France) Monster Energy GCK RX Cartel	Renault Mégane R.S. RX	13	(Norway) Andreas Bakkerud	All	
Renault	(France) Monster Energy GCK RX Cartel	Renault Mégane R.S. RX	33	(United Kingdom) Liam Doran	All	
Renault	(France) GCK Bilstein	Renault Mégane R.S. RX	92	(Sweden) Anton Marklund	All	
SEAT	(Germany) ALL-INKL.COM Münnich Motorsport	SEAT Ibiza RX	38	(Germany) Mandie August	7–8	
SEAT	(Germany) ALL-INKL.COM Münnich Motorsport	SEAT Ibiza RX	44	(Germany) Timo Scheider	All	
SEAT	(Germany) ALL-INKL.COM Münnich Motorsport	SEAT Ibiza RX	77	(Germany) René Münnich	1–6	
Škoda	(Lithuania) ESmotorsport	Škoda Fabia RX	15	(Latvia) Reinis Nitišs	5–6	
Volkswagen	(Sweden) Volkswagen Dealerteam BAUHAUS	Volkswagen Polo GTI RX	3	(Sweden) Johan Kristoffersson	All	

=== RX2 ===
Constructor	Team	Car	No.	Drivers	Ref.
OMSE	(Sweden) VGracing	Olsbergs MSE RX2	8	(Sweden) Gustav Johansson	
OMSE	(Sweden) Olsbergs MSE	Olsbergs MSE RX2	9	(France) Grégory Fosse	
OMSE	(Sweden) Olsbergs MSE	Olsbergs MSE RX2	18	(Sweden) Linus Östlund	
OMSE	(Sweden) Olsbergs MSE	Olsbergs MSE RX2	47	(Finland) Jesse Kallio	
OMSE	(Sweden) Olsbergs MSE	Olsbergs MSE RX2	60	(Sweden) Martin Enlund	
OMSE	(Sweden) Olsbergs MSE	Olsbergs MSE RX2	91	(Sweden) Niklas Aneklev	
OMSE	(Sweden) Olsbergs MSE	Olsbergs MSE RX2	96	(Belgium) Guillaume De Ridder	
OMSE	(Sweden) Alfta Racing Team	Olsbergs MSE RX2	10	(Sweden) Martin Jonsson	
OMSE	(Sweden) MORX	Olsbergs MSE RX2	11	(Sweden) Mats Oskarsson	
OMSE	(Sweden) STS RX	Olsbergs MSE RX2	52	(Sweden) Simon Olofsson	
OMSE	(Sweden) Yellow Squad Team Färén	Olsbergs MSE RX2	77	(Norway) Henrik Krogstad	
OMSE	(Sweden) Yellow Squad Team Färén	Olsbergs MSE RX2	999	(Czech Republic) Dan Skocdopole	
OMSE	(Sweden) Helmia Motorsport	Olsbergs MSE RX2	90	(Sweden) Jimmie Walfridson	
OMSE	(Sweden) JC Raceteknik	Olsbergs MSE RX2	99	(Norway) Hans-Ola Frøshaug	

=== Projekt E ===
Constructor	Team	Car	No.	Drivers	Rounds	Ref.
STARD	(Finland) Ferratum Team	Ford Fiesta	6	(Latvia) Jānis Baumanis	2	
STARD	(Austria) Ford Österreich	Ford Fiesta	21	(Austria) Hermann Neubauer	1	
STARD	(Poland) Rallytechnology	Ford Fiesta	41	(United Kingdom) Natalie Barratt	All	
STARD	(United States) Hoonigan Racing Division	Ford Fiesta	43	(United States) Ken Block	1	
STARD	(Norway) Holten Motorsport	Ford Fiesta	5	(Norway) Svein Bjarte Holten	2	
STARD	(France) Citroën Racing	Citroën C3	113	(France) Cyril Raymond	2	

== Championship Standings ==
World Championship points are scored as follows:

	Position															
Round	1st	2nd	3rd	4th	5th	6th	7th	8th	9th	10th	11th	12th	13th	14th	15th	16th
Heats	16	15	14	13	12	11	10	9	8	7	6	5	4	3	2	1
Semi-Finals	6	5	4	3	2	1										
Final	8	5	4	3	2	1										

- A red background denotes drivers eliminated from that round.

=== Supercar ===
==== FIA World Rallycross Championship for Drivers ====
Pos.	Driver	SWE (Sweden)		FIN (Finland)		LAT (Latvia)		BAR (Spain)		Points
1	(Sweden) Johan Kristoffersson	1	3	1	4	1	2	2	1	219
2	(Sweden) Mattias Ekström	2	1	7	2	2	1	5	4	192
3	(Sweden) Timmy Hansen	6	11	3	5	3	4	1	2	163
4	(Finland) Niclas Grönholm	4	9	4	1	5	5	4	8	147
5	(Sweden) Kevin Hansen	8	2	6	7	4	6	3	7	135
6	(Sweden) Robin Larsson	7	5	8	10	6	3	12	6	122
7	(Norway) Andreas Bakkerud	13	6	9	6	8	7	6	5	121
8	(Germany) Timo Scheider	3	4	5	9	12	10	9	9	92
9	(Sweden) Anton Marklund	5	8	12	11	14	9	8	3	90
10	(Russia) Timur Timerzyanov	12	10	10	3	10	8	7	10	81
11	(Hungary) Krisztián Szabó	9	7			7	11			41
12	(Finland) Juha Rytkönen			2	8					37
13	(United Kingdom) Liam Doran	17	17	19	14	9	12	10	16	29
14	(Germany) René Münnich	14	12	16	19	13	14			18
15	(Hungary) Támas Kárai			13	16			14	11	15
16	(Finland) Jere Kalliokoski			11	12					14
17	(France) Guerlain Chicherit	16	13	14	15	15	15			14
18	(Sweden) Sebastian Eriksson	10	15							12
19	(Latvia) Reinis Nitišs					11	13			12
20	(Lithuania) Rokas Baciuška	11	14			16	16			12
21	(United Kingdom) Oliver Bennett							11	14	11
22	(Belgium) Enzo Ide							13	12	11
23	(Finland) Jani Paasonen	15	16	15	17	17	17			5
24	(Germany) Mandie August							16	13	5
25	(Netherlands) Kevin Abbring			17	13					4
26	(France) Patrick Guillerme							15	15	4
	(Finland) Atro Määttä			18	18					0
Pos.	Driver	SWE (Sweden)		FIN (Finland)		LAT (Latvia)		BAR (Spain)		Points

Colour	Result
Gold	Winner
Silver	Second place
Bronze	Third place
Green	Points finish
Blue	Non-points finish
Blue	Non-classified finish (NC)
Purple	Retired (Ret)
Red	Did not qualify (DNQ)
Red	Did not pre-qualify (DNPQ)
Black	Disqualified (DSQ)
White	Did not start (DNS)
White	Withdrew (WD)
White	Race cancelled (C)
Blank	Did not practice (DNP)
Blank	Did not arrive (DNA)
Blank	Excluded (EX)

=== FIA World Rallycross Championship for Teams ===
Pos.	Team	No.	SWE (Sweden)		FIN (Finland)		LAT (Latvia)		BAR (Spain)		Points
1	(Sweden) KYB Team JC	4	7	5	8	10	6	3	12	6	340
1	(Sweden) KYB Team JC	5	2	1	7	2	2	1	5	4	340
2	(Sweden) Team Hansen	1	6	11	3	5	3	4	1	2	310
2	(Sweden) Team Hansen	9	8	2	6	7	4	6	3	7	310
3	(Finland) GRX Taneco	7	12	10	10	3	10	8	7	10	298
3	(Finland) GRX Taneco	68	4	9	4	1	5	5	4	8	298
4	(France) Monster Energy GCK RX Cartel	13	13	6	9	6	8	7	6	5	270
4	(France) Monster Energy GCK RX Cartel	33	17	17	19	14	9	12	10	16	270
5	(Germany) ALL-INKL.COM Münnich Motorsport	30							16	13	219
5	(Germany) ALL-INKL.COM Münnich Motorsport	44	3	4	5	9	12	10	9	9	219
5	(Germany) ALL-INKL.COM Münnich Motorsport	77	14	12	16	19	13	14			219
6	(France) GCK UNKORRUPTED	219	11	14			16	16			115
6	(France) GCK UNKORRUPTED	36	16	13	14	15	15	15			115
6	(France) GCK UNKORRUPTED	69			17	13					115
Pos.	Team	No.	SWE (Sweden)		FIN (Finland)		LAT (Latvia)		BAR (Spain)		Points

=== RX2 Series ===
Pos.	Driver	DNK (Denmark)		Points
1	(Norway) Henrik Krogstad	2	1	54
2	(Belgium) Guillaume De Ridder	1	2	53
3	(Finland) Jesse Kallio	3	3	43
4	(Sweden) Jimmie Walfridson	5	4	36
5	(Sweden) Simon Olofsson	6	7	36
6	(Sweden) Linus Östlund	4	12	29
7	(Sweden) Niklas Aneklev	11	5	25
8	(Sweden) Gustav Johansson	7	6	24
9	(Sweden) Martin Enlund	8	9	22
10	(Sweden) Mats Oskarsson	9	10	21
11	(Sweden) Martin Jonsson	13	8	16
12	(Czech Republic) Dan Skocdopole	14	11	12
13	(Norway) Hans-Ola Frøshaug	10	14	11
14	(France) Gregory Fosse	12	13	9
Pos.	Driver	DNK (Denmark)		Points

=== Projekt E ===
Pos.	Driver	SWE (Sweden)	LAT (Latvia)	Points
1	(United Kingdom) Natalie Barratt	2	4	35
2	(United States) Ken Block	1		24
3	(France) Cyril Raymond		1	24
4	(Latvia) Janis Baumanis		2	20
5	(Austria) Hermann Neubauer	3		19
6	(Norway) Svein Bjarte Holten		3	18
Pos.	Driver	SWE (Sweden)	LAT (Latvia)	Points
