= Jani Paasonen =

Finnish rally driver (born 1975)

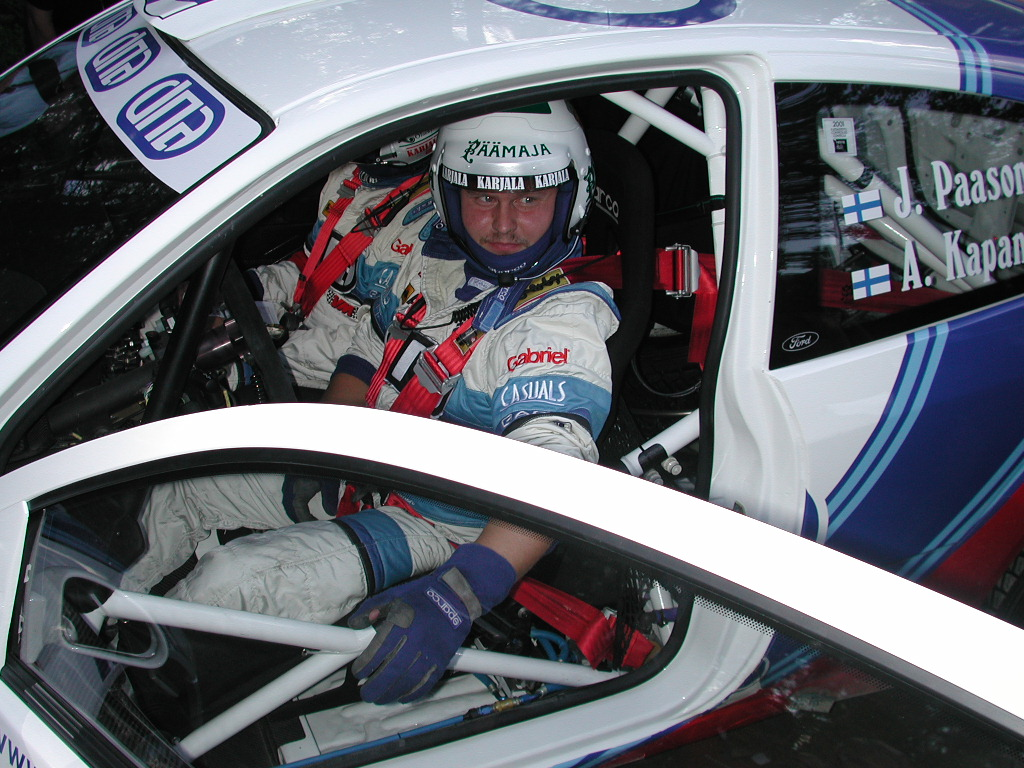
- Paasonen at 2001 Rally Finland

Personal information
- Nationality: (Finland) Finnish
- Full name: Jani Petteri Paasonen
- Born: 11 April 1975 (age 51)

World Rally Championship record
- Years active: 1997– 2005, 2021
- Co-driver: (Finland) Kari Jokinen (Finland) Arto Kapanen (Finland) Jakke Honkanen (Finland) Sirkka Rautiainen (Finland) Jani Vainikka
- Teams: OMV World Rally Team, Škoda Motorsport
- Rallies: 31
- Championships: 0
- Rally wins: 0
- Podiums: 0
- Stage wins: 1
- Total points: 3
- First rally: 1997 Rally Finland
- Last rally: 2021 Rally Finland

Jani Petteri Paasonen (born 11 April 1975) is a Finnish rally driver. He used to compete in the World Rally Championship (WRC) with Škoda Motorsport. His best result was 6th place at Rally Finland 2004 with Škoda Fabia WRC.

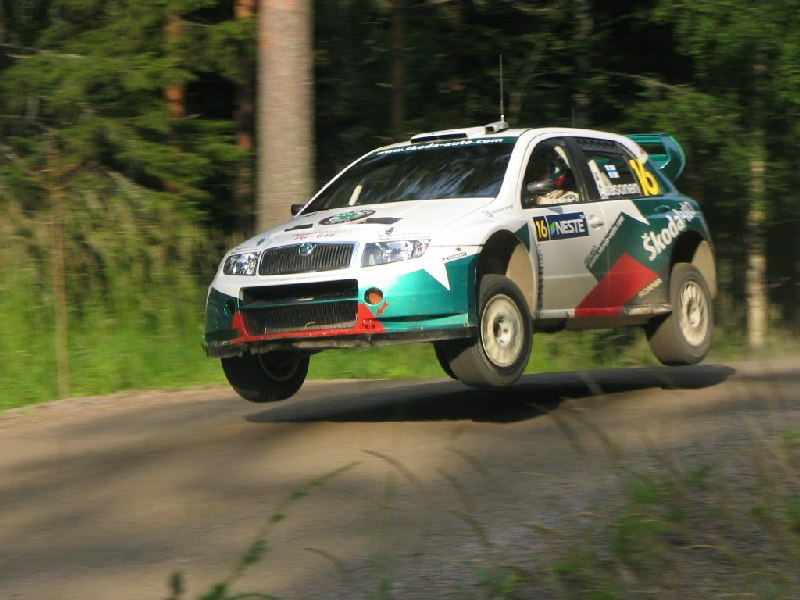
Paasonen at the Rally Finland 2004

== WRC results ==
| Year | Entrant | Car | 1 | 2 | 3 | 4 | 5 | 6 | 7 | 8 | 9 | 10 | 11 | 12 | 13 | 14 | 15 | 16 | WDC | Points |
|---|---|---|---|---|---|---|---|---|---|---|---|---|---|---|---|---|---|---|---|---|
| 1997 | Jani Paasonen | Mitsubishi Lancer Evo III | MON | SWE | KEN | POR | ESP | FRA | ARG | GRC | NZL | FIN; 21 | IDN | ITA | AUS | GBR | | | NC | 0 |
| 1998 | Jani Paasonen | Mitsubishi Lancer Evo III | MON | SWE | KEN | POR | ESP | FRA | ARG | GRE | NZL | FIN; Ret | ITA | AUS | GBR | | | | NC | 0 |
| 1999 | Jani Paasonen | Mitsubishi Carisma GT Evo IV | MON | SWE; 17 | KEN | POR | ESP | FRA | ARG | GRE | NZL | FIN; 17 | CHN | ITA | AUS | GBR | | | NC | 0 |
| 2000 | Jani Paasonen | Mitsubishi Carisma GT Evo IV | MON | SWE; 17 | KEN | POR | ESP; 22 | ARG | GRE | NZL | FIN; 16 | CYP | FRA | ITA | AUS; Ret | GBR | | | NC | 0 |
| 2001 | Blue Rose Team | Ford Focus RS WRC 00 | MON | SWE; Ret | POR | ESP | ARG | CYP | GRE | KEN | | | | | | | | | NC | 0 |
| 2001 | Blue Rose Team | Ford Focus RS WRC 01 | | | | | | | | | FIN; Ret | NZL | ITA | FRA | AUS | GBR | | | NC | 0 |
| 2002 | Marlboro Mitsubishi Ralliart | Mitsubishi Lancer WRC | MON | SWE; 14 | FRA | ESP | CYP; Ret | ARG | GRE | KEN | | | | | | | | | NC | 0 |
| 2002 | Marlboro Mitsubishi Ralliart | Mitsubishi Lancer WRC2 | | | | | | | | | FIN; 8 | GER | ITA | NZL; Ret | AUS; 9 | GBR; Ret | | | NC | 0 |
| 2003 | Jani Paasonen | Mitsubishi Lancer WRC2 | MON | SWE | TUR | NZL | ARG | GRE | CYP | GER; Ret | FIN | AUS | ITA | FRA | ESP | GBR | | | NC | 0 |
| 2004 | OMV World Rally Team | Mitsubishi Lancer Evo VII | MON | SWE; 16 | MEX; Ret | NZL; 14 | CYP | GRE | TUR | ARG; 10 | | GER; 20 | JPN | | ITA | FRA | ESP | AUS; EX | 20th | 3 |
| 2004 | Škoda Motorsport | Škoda Fabia WRC | | | | | | | | | FIN; 6 | | | GBR; Ret | | | | | 20th | 3 |
| 2005 | Škoda Motorsport | Škoda Fabia WRC | MON | SWE; 9 | MEX; 13 | NZL | ITA | CYP | TUR | GRE; Ret | ARG; Ret | FIN; Ret | GER | GBR | JPN | FRA | ESP | AUS | NC | 0 |
| 2021 | Team Capitalbox | Ford Fiesta R5 | MON | ARC | CRO | POR | ITA | KEN | EST | BEL | GRE | FIN; Ret | ESP | MNZ | | | | | NC | 0 |

=== Complete FIA World Rallycross Championship results ===
(key)

==== Supercar ====
| Year | Entrant | Car | 1 | 2 | 3 | 4 | 5 | 6 | 7 | 8 | 9 | 10 | WRX | Points |
|---|---|---|---|---|---|---|---|---|---|---|---|---|---|---|
| 2019 | STARD | Ford Fiesta MK7 | UAE | ESP; 16 | BEL | | | | | | | | 22nd | 9 |
| 2019 | STARD | Ford Fiesta MK8 | | | | GBR; 14 | NOR; 13 | SWE | CAN; 16 | FRA; 17 | LAT | RSA | 22nd | 9 |
| 2020 | Ferratum Team | Ford Fiesta Supercar RX | SWE; 15 | SWE; 16 | FIN; 15 | FIN; 17 | LAT; 17 | LAT; 17 | ESP | ESP | | | 23rd | 5 |
