= World RX of Catalunya =

Rallycross event held in Spain

World RX layout of Circuit de Barcelona-Catalunya

The World RX of Catalunya was a Rallycross event held in Spain for the FIA World Rallycross Championship. The event made its debut in the 2015 season, at the Circuit de Barcelona-Catalunya in the town of Montmeló, Catalonia.

From 2015 to 2018, the event was called "World RX of Barcelona". From 2019 onwards, it's called "World RX of Catalunya".

Due to COVID-19 pandemic which affected the 2020 FIA World Rallycross Championship season calendar, the circuit hosted a double-header season finale. The first race was named as World RX of Pirineus-Barcelona 2030 as mark of support for Pyrenees-Barcelona bid for the 2030 Winter Olympics. The second race was held under World RX of Catalunya name.

== Past winners ==
Year	Heat 1 winner	Heat 2 winner	Heat 3 winner	Heat 4 winner	Semi-Final 1 winner	Semi-Final 2 winner	Final winner
2015	(Sweden) Timmy Hansen	(Norway) Petter Solberg	(Sweden) Johan Kristoffersson	(Sweden) Timmy Hansen	(Sweden) Timmy Hansen	(Sweden) Johan Kristoffersson	(Norway) Petter Solberg
Year	Qualifying 1 winner	Qualifying 2 winner	Qualifying 3 winner	Qualifying 4 winner	Semi-Final 1 winner	Semi-Final 2 winner	Final winner
2016	(Sweden) Timmy Hansen	(Sweden) Mattias Ekström	(Sweden) Johan Kristoffersson	(Sweden) Johan Kristoffersson	(Sweden) Mattias Ekström	(Russia) Timur Timerzyanov	(Sweden) Mattias Ekström
2017	(Sweden) Johan Kristoffersson	(Finland) Toomas Heikkinen	(Sweden) Mattias Ekström	(Norway) Andreas Bakkerud	(Sweden) Johan Kristoffersson	(Sweden) Mattias Ekström	(Sweden) Mattias Ekström
2018	(Sweden) Mattias Ekström	(Norway) Petter Solberg	(Norway) Petter Solberg	(Sweden) Timmy Hansen	(Norway) Petter Solberg	(Sweden) Mattias Ekström	(Sweden) Johan Kristoffersson
2019	(Sweden) Timmy Hansen	(Sweden) Timmy Hansen	(Sweden) Timmy Hansen	(Sweden) Timmy Hansen	(Sweden) Timmy Hansen	(Sweden) Kevin Hansen	(Sweden) Timmy Hansen
2020	(Sweden) Johan Kristoffersson	(Norway) Andreas Bakkerud	(Sweden) Johan Kristoffersson	No Q4 (Double Header)	(Sweden) Johan Kristoffersson	(Sweden) Timmy Hansen	(Sweden) Timmy Hansen
2020	(Sweden) Mattias Ekström	(Sweden) Mattias Ekström	(Norway) Andreas Bakkerud	No Q4 (Double Header)	(Sweden) Johan Kristoffersson	(Norway) Andreas Bakkerud	(Sweden) Johan Kristoffersson
2021	(Sweden) Timmy Hansen	(Sweden) Johan Kristoffersson	(Sweden) Johan Kristoffersson	(Sweden) Johan Kristoffersson	(Sweden) Timmy Hansen	(Sweden) Kevin Hansen	(Sweden) Kevin Hansen
Year	Heat 1 winner	Heat 2 winner	Heat 3 winner	Progression best time	Semi-Final 1 winner	Semi-Final 2 winner	Final winner
2022	(Sweden) Johan Kristoffersson	(Sweden) Johan Kristoffersson	No Q3 (Double Header)	(Sweden) Kevin Hansen	(Sweden) Johan Kristoffersson	(Sweden) Kevin Hansen	(Sweden) Timmy Hansen
2022	(Sweden) Johan Kristoffersson	(Sweden) Johan Kristoffersson	No Q3 (Double Header)	(Sweden) Johan Kristoffersson	(Finland) Niclas Grönholm	(Sweden) Timmy Hansen	(Sweden) Johan Kristoffersson
