= 2020 World RX of Finland =

Season of rallycross

- Round 3 of 8 in the 2020 FIA World Rallycross Championship
- Date: 29 August 2020
- Location: Kouvola, Kymenlaakso
- Venue: Tykkimäen Moottorirata

Results
Heat winners
- Heat 1: (Sweden) Johan Kristoffersson; Kristoffersson Motorsport
- Heat 2: (Sweden) Johan Kristoffersson; Kristoffersson Motorsport
- Heat 3: (Sweden) Johan Kristoffersson; Kristoffersson Motorsport
Semi-final winners
- Semi-final 1: (Sweden) Johan Kristoffersson; Kristoffersson Motorsport
- Semi-final 2: (Finland) Juha Rytkönen; GRX Set
Final
- First: (Sweden) Johan Kristoffersson; Kristoffersson Motorsport
- Second: (Finland) Juha Rytkönen; GRX Set
- Third: (Sweden) Timmy Hansen; Team Hansen

2020 World RX of Finland
- Round 4 of 8 in the 2020 FIA World Rallycross Championship
- Date: 30 August 2020
- Location: Kouvola, Kymenlaakso
- Venue: Tykkimäen Moottorirata

Results
Heat winners
- Heat 1: (Sweden) Johan Kristoffersson; Kristoffersson Motorsport
- Heat 2: (Finland) Niclas Grönholm; GRX Taneco Team
- Heat 3: (Sweden) Johan Kristoffersson; Kristoffersson Motorsport
Semi-final winners
- Semi-final 1: (Sweden) Johan Kristoffersson; Kristoffersson Motorsport
- Semi-final 2: (Finland) Niclas Grönholm; GRX Taneco Team
Final
- First: (Finland) Niclas Grönholm; GRX Taneco Team
- Second: (Sweden) Mattias Ekström; KYB Team JC
- Third: (Russia) Timur Timerzyanov; GRX Taneco Team

The 2020 Capitalbox World RX of Finland was the third and fourth round of the seventh season of the FIA World Rallycross Championship. The event was held at the Tykkimäki amusement park in Kouvola.

In June 2020, an extraordinary World Motor Sport Council added an event in Kouvola (Finland) to replace the World RX of France as it was cancelled, due to the COVID-19 pandemic. The event was a double-header

== Supercar Race 1 ==
=== Heats ===
Pos.	No.	Driver	Team	Car	Q1	Q2	Q3	Pts
1	3	(Sweden) Johan Kristoffersson	Kristoffersson Motorsport	Volkswagen Polo	1st	1st	1st	16
2	5	(Sweden) Mattias Ekström	KYB Team JC	Audi S1	2nd	2nd	8th	15
3	1	(Sweden) Timmy Hansen	Team Hansen	Peugeot 208	3rd	4th	5th	14
4	177	(Finland) Juha Rytkönen	GRX Set	Hyundai i20	4th	6th	4th	13
5	68	(Finland) Niclas Grönholm	GRX Taneco Team	Hyundai i20	5th	5th	7th	12
6	4	(Sweden) Robin Larsson	KYB Team JC	Audi S1	9th	10th	2nd	11
7	13	(Norway) Andreas Bakkerud	Monster Energy GCK RX Cartel	Renault Mégane RS	6th	3rd	10th	10
8	9	(Sweden) Kevin Hansen	Team Hansen	Peugeot 208	10th	8th	3rd	9
9	7	(Russia) Timur Timerzyanov	GRX Taneco Team	Hyundai i20	12th	11th	6th	8
10	44	(Germany) Timo Scheider	ALL-INKL.COM Münnich Motorsport	Seat Ibiza	7th	7th	17th	7
11	92	(Sweden) Anton Marklund	GCK Bilstein	Renault Mégane RS	11th	9th	16th	6
12	22	(Finland) Jere Kalliokoski	Kalliokoski Motorsport	Ford Fiesta	14th	16th	9th	5
13	73	(Hungary) Tamás Kárai	Karai Motorsport Sportegyesület	Audi S1	17th	12th	11th	4
14	36	(France) Guerlain Chicherit	Unkorrupted	Renault Clio RS	16th	13th	12th	3
15	11	(Finland) Jani Paasonen	Ferratum Team	Ford Fiesta	15th	15th	14th	2
16	77	(Germany) René Münnich	ALL-INKL.COM Münnich Motorsport	Seat Ibiza	19th	14th	13th	1
17	69	(Netherlands) Kevin Abbring	Unkorrupted	Renault Clio RS	13th	17th	18th	
18	65	(Finland) Atro Määttä	Atro Määttä	Ford Fiesta	18th	18th	15th	
19	33	(United Kingdom) Liam Doran	Monster Energy GCK RX Cartel	Renault Mégane RS	8th	19th	19th	

=== Semi-finals ===
Semi-Final 1

Pos.	No.	Driver	Team	Time	Pts
1	3	(Sweden) Johan Kristoffersson	Kristoffersson Motorsport	4:07.786	6
2	1	(Sweden) Timmy Hansen	Team Hansen	+ 1.610	5
3	68	(Finland) Niclas Grönholm	GRX Taneco Team	+ 1.825	4
4	13	(Norway) Andreas Bakkerud	Monster Energy GCK RX Cartel	+ 3.372	3
5	7	(Russia) Timur Timerzyanov	GRX Taneco Team	+ 5.894	2
6	92	(Sweden) Anton Marklund	GCK Bilstein	DNF	1

Semi-Final 2

Pos.	No.	Driver	Team	Time	Pts
1	177	(Finland) Juha Rytkönen	GRX Set	4:08.628	6
2	9	(Sweden) Kevin Hansen	Team Hansen	+ 1.719	5
3	44	(Germany) Timo Scheider	ALL-INKL.COM Münnich Motorsport	+ 2.499	4
4	93	(Finland) Jere Kalliokoski	Kalliokoski Motorsport	+ 7.788	3
5	4	(Sweden) Robin Larsson	KYB Team JC	DNF	2
6	5	(Sweden) Mattias Ekström	KYB Team JC	DNF	1

=== Final ===
Pos.	No.	Driver	Team	Time	Pts
1	3	(Sweden) Johan Kristoffersson	Kristoffersson Motorsport	4:04.669	8
2	177	(Finland) Juha Rytkönen	GRX Set	+ 3.110	5
3	1	(Sweden) Timmy Hansen	Team Hansen	+ 4.062	4
4	68	(Finland) Niclas Grönholm	GRX Taneco Team	+ 4.293	3
5	44	(Germany) Timo Scheider	ALL-INKL.COM Münnich Motorsport	+ 5.327	2
6	9	(Sweden) Kevin Hansen	Team Hansen	+ 6.635	1

== Supercar Race 2 ==
=== Heats ===
Pos.	No.	Driver	Team	Car	Q1	Q2	Q3	Pts
1	3	(Sweden) Johan Kristoffersson	Kristoffersson Motorsport	Volkswagen Polo	1st	14th	1st	16
2	68	(Finland) Niclas Grönholm	GRX Taneco Team	Hyundai i20	8th	1st	4th	15
3	5	(Sweden) Mattias Ekström	KYB Team JC	Audi S1	3rd	4th	6th	14
4	1	(Sweden) Timmy Hansen	Team Hansen	Peugeot 208	2nd	13th	3rd	13
5	13	(Norway) Andreas Bakkerud	Monster Energy GCK RX Cartel	Renault Mégane RS	5th	11th	2nd	12
6	9	(Sweden) Kevin Hansen	Team Hansen	Peugeot 208	7th	2nd	9th	11
7	177	(Finland) Juha Rytkönen	GRX Set	Hyundai i20	4th	6th	7th	10
8	44	(Germany) Timo Scheider	ALL-INKL.COM Münnich Motorsport	Seat Ibiza	6th	9th	8th	9
9	4	(Sweden) Robin Larsson	KYB Team JC	Audi S1	9th	7th	10th	8
10	7	(Russia) Timur Timerzyanov	GRX Taneco Team	Hyundai i20	11th	3rd	14th	7
11	92	(Sweden) Anton Marklund	GCK Bilstein	Renault Mégane RS	10th	10th	11th	6
12	22	(Finland) Jere Kalliokoski	Kalliokoski Motorsport	Ford Fiesta	12th	5th	16th	5
13	69	(Netherlands) Kevin Abbring	Unkorrupted	Renault Clio RS	15th	8th	12th	4
14	33	(United Kingdom) Liam Doran	Monster Energy GCK RX Cartel	Renault Mégane RS	13th	18th	5th	3
15	36	(France) Guerlain Chicherit	Unkorrupted	Renault Clio RS	14th	15th	13th	2
16	73	(Hungary) Tamás Kárai	Karai Motorsport Sportegyesület	Audi S1	17th	12th	15th	1
17	11	(Finland) Jani Paasonen	Ferratum Team	Ford Fiesta	16th	17th	18th	
18	65	(Finland) Atro Määttä	Atro Määttä	Ford Fiesta	18th	19th	17th	
19	77	(Germany) René Münnich	ALL-INKL.COM Münnich Motorsport	Seat Ibiza	19th	16th	19th	

=== Semi-finals ===
Semi-Final 1

Pos.	No.	Driver	Team	Time	Pts
1	3	(Sweden) Johan Kristoffersson	Kristoffersson Motorsport	4:46.451	6
2	5	(Sweden) Mattias Ekström	KYB Team JC	+ 2.400	5
3	13	(Norway) Andreas Bakkerud	Monster Energy GCK RX Cartel	+ 12.457	4
4	177	(Finland) Juha Rytkönen	GRX Set	+ 15.852	3
5	4	(Sweden) Robin Larsson	KYB Team JC	+ 16.389	2
6	92	(Sweden) Anton Marklund	GCK Bilstein	+ 39.462	1

Semi-Final 2

Pos.	No.	Driver	Team	Time	Pts
1	68	(Finland) Niclas Grönholm	GRX Taneco Team	4:57.733	6
2	1	(Sweden) Timmy Hansen	Team Hansen	+ 2.575	5
3	7	(Russia) Timur Timerzyanov	GRX Taneco Team	+ 2.983	4
4	9	(Sweden) Kevin Hansen	Team Hansen	+ 3.043	3
5	44	(Germany) Timo Scheider	ALL-INKL.COM Münnich Motorsport	+ 6.182	2
6	93	(Finland) Jere Kalliokoski	Kalliokoski Motorsport	+ 10.504	1

=== Final ===
Pos.	No.	Driver	Team	Time	Pts
1	68	(Finland) Niclas Grönholm	GRX Taneco Team	5:05.975	8
2	5	(Sweden) Mattias Ekström	KYB Team JC	+ 0.394	5
3	1	(Russia) Timur Timerzyanov	GRX Taneco Team	+ 1.348	4
4	3	(Sweden) Johan Kristoffersson	Kristoffersson Motorsport	+ 1.652	3
5	1	(Sweden) Timmy Hansen	Team Hansen	+ 2.066	2
6	13	(Norway) Andreas Bakkerud	Monster Energy GCK RX Cartel	+ 7.508	1

== Standings after the event ==
Pos.	Driver	Pts	Gap
1	(Sweden) Johan Kristoffersson	111	
2	(Sweden) Mattias Ekström	94	+17
3	(Finland) Niclas Grönholm	76	+35
4	(Sweden) Timmy Hansen	70	+41
5	(Sweden) Kevin Hansen	64	+47
6	(Sweden) Robin Larsson	59	+52

- Note: Only the top six positions are included.

Previous race: 2020 World RX of Sweden	FIA World Rallycross Championship; 2020 season	Next race: 2020 World RX of Riga-Latvia
Previous race: 2014 World RX of Finland	World RX of Finland	Next race: none
