= Anton Marklund =

Swedish racecar driver (born 1992)

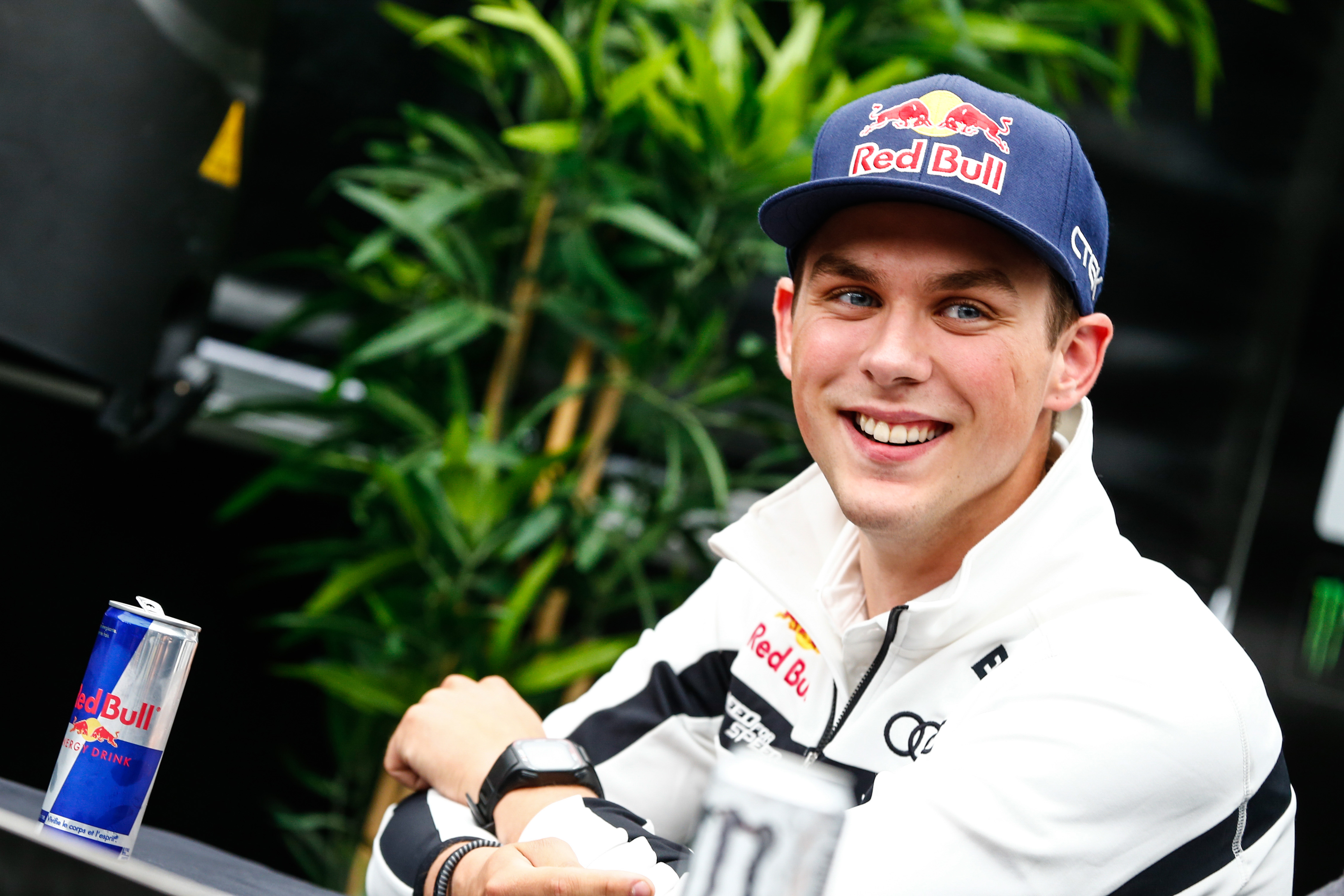
- Marklund in 2015
- Nationality: (Sweden) Swedish
- Born: Anton Olof Alexander Marklund; 9 December 1992 (age 33) Boliden, Sweden

FIA ERX Supercar Championship career
- Debut season: 2013
- Current team: SET Promotion
- Car number: 92
- Starts: 26
- Championships: 2 (2017, 2022)
- Wins: 7
- Podiums: 12
- Finished last season: 1st
- Current team: ALL-INKL.COM Münnich Motorsport

FIA World Rallycross Championship
- Years active: 2014–2018
- Car number: 92
- Former teams: Volkswagen RX Sweden; EKS RX; Marklund Motorsport; GCK Bilstein; Marklund Motorsport
- Starts: 64
- Wins: 0
- Podiums: 4
- Best finish: 6th in 2014

FIA ERX TouringCar Championship
- Years active: 2011–2012
- Former teams: Marklund Motorsport
- Starts: 15
- Championships: 1 (2012)
- Wins: 2
- Podiums: 9

Anton Olof Alexander Marklund (born 9 December 1992) is a Swedish racing driver who won the European Rallycross Championship three times in 2017, 2022, and 2023. He has competed most of his career for his father's team Marklund Motorsport.

== Career ==
Marklund entered five rounds of the 2011 European Rallycross Championship for Marklund Motorsport with a Ford Fiesta TouringCar, scoring a third-place finish at Sweden. In the 2011 European Rallycross Championship he scored two wins and six second-place finishes, claiming the TouringCar title.

For the 2013 European Rallycross Championship, Marklund moved to the Supercar to drive a Volkswagen Polo, finishing seventh in points.

Marklund raced the 2014 FIA World Rallycross Championship for Marklund Motorsport in a Volkswagen Polo Supercar. He made five finals, including a career-best second in Canada. He ended the season sixth in the points, having scored points in every event.

In 2015, Marklund raced at the FIA World Rallycross Championship with Mattias Ekström's team, EKS RX, driving an Audi S1 at races except Canada, where he drove a Volkswagen Polo. He endured a tough start to the season, rolling in the season opener in Portugal and launched off Daniel Holten in Sweden. He finished the season strongly, with a sixth in Turkey and a fourth in Italy. That same year, Marklund also ran in the Audi Sport TT Cup, finishing 16th in the standings with 63 points and a best finish of eighth.

For the 2016 FIA World Rallycross Championship, Kristoffersson Motorsport and Marklund Motorsport combined their operations to participate under the brand Volkswagen RX Sweden. Driving a Volkswagen Polo Supercar, Marklund finished 13th in points, with best results of fourth at Belgium and Sweden.

Marklund left the World Rallycross Championship in 2017, and returned to the European Rallycross Championship with Marklund Motorsport. He won the title with three wins in five races.

== Racing record ==
=== Complete FIA European Rallycross Championship results ===
(key)

==== TouringCar ====
Year	Entrant	Car	1	2	3	4	5	6	7	8	9	10	ERX	Points
2011	Marklund Motorsport	Ford Fiesta	GBR	POR	FRA	NOR; 10	SWE; 3	BEL; 11	NED; 5	AUT	POL	CZE; 4	8th	53
2012	Marklund Motorsport	Ford Fiesta	GBR; 1	FRA; 2	AUT; 2	HUN; 2	NOR (6)	SWE; 2	BEL; 2	NED; 1	FIN; 2	GER (7)	1st	142

==== Supercar/RX1 ====
Year	Entrant	Car	1	2	3	4	5	6	7	8	9	ERX	Points
2013	Marklund Motorsport	Volkswagen Polo	GBR; 7	POR; 9	HUN; 8	FIN; 9	NOR; 7	SWE; 21	FRA; 13	AUT; 7	GER; 9	7th	102
2017	Marklund Motorsport	Volkswagen Polo	BAR; 1	NOR; 2	SWE; 1	FRA; 4	LAT; 1					1st	129
2018	Marklund Motorsport	Volkswagen Polo	BAR; 2	BEL; 1	SWE; 14	FRA; 3	LAT; 3					2nd	101
2021	Hedströms Motorsport	Volkswagen Polo	SWE; 7	FRA	LAT	BEL						17th	15
2022	SET Promotion	Hyundai i20	HUN; 1	SWE; 1	NOR; 4	LAT; 2	POR; 4	BEN; 1				1st	100

=== Complete FIA World Rallycross Championship results ===
(key)

==== Supercar/RX1/RX1e ====
Year	Entrant	Car	1	2	3	4	5	6	7	8	9	10	11	12	13	WRX	Points
2014	Marklund Motorsport	Volkswagen Polo	POR; 5	GBR; 12	NOR; 8	FIN; 5	SWE; 14	BEL; 4	CAN; 2	FRA; 8	GER; 17	ITA; 6	TUR; 4	ARG; 7		6th	173
2015	EKS RX	Audi S1	POR; 17	HOC; 20	BEL; 7	GBR; 14	GER; 11	SWE; 25		NOR; 8	FRA; 9	BAR; 15	TUR; 6	ITA; 4	ARG; 11	12th	78
2015	EKS RX	Volkswagen Polo							CAN; 14							12th	78
2016	Volkswagen RX Sweden	Volkswagen Polo	POR; 12	HOC; 15	BEL; 4	GBR; 9	NOR; 15	SWE; 4	CAN; 6	FRA; 18	BAR; 14	LAT; 15	GER; 15	ARG; 11		13th	76
2018	Marklund Motorsport	Volkswagen Polo	BAR	POR	BEL	GBR; 17	NOR; 11	SWE	CAN	FRA	LAT	USA; 12	GER; 9	RSA; 8		14th	35
2019	GC Kompetition	Renault Mégane R.S.	UAE; 7	ESP; 14	BEL; 7	GBR; 3	NOR; DSQ	SWE; 8	CAN; 5	FRA; 2	LAT; 9	RSA; 11				7th	119
2020	GCK Bilstein	Renault Mégane R.S. RX	SWE; 5	SWE; 8	FIN; 12	FIN; 11	LAT; 14	LAT; 9	ESP; 8	ESP; 3						9th	90
2021	Hedströms Motorsport	Hyundai i20	BAR	SWE	FRA	LAT	LAT	BEL; 6	PRT	GER; 12	GER; 8					13th	33
2022	ALL-INKL.COM Münnich Motorsport	SEAT Ibiza RX1e	NOR	LAT	LAT	POR	POR	BEL	BEL	ESP	ESP	GER; 8				9th	8

Sporting positions
Preceded by Lars Øivind Enerberg	European Rallycross TouringCar Champion; 2012	Succeeded by Derek Tohill
Preceded by Kevin Hansen	European Rallycross Supercar Champion; 2017	Succeeded by Reinis Nitišs
