= 2020 World RX of Sweden =

Season of rallycross

- Round 1 of 8 in the 2020 FIA World Rallycross Championship
- Date: 22 August 2020
- Location: Höljes, Värmland
- Venue: Höljesbanan

Results
Heat winners
- Heat 1: (Sweden) Johan Kristoffersson; Kristoffersson Motorsport
- Heat 2: (Sweden) Mattias Ekström; KYB Team JC
- Heat 3: (Sweden) Johan Kristoffersson; Kristoffersson Motorsport
Semi-final winners
- Semi-final 1: (Sweden) Johan Kristoffersson; Kristoffersson Motorsport
- Semi-final 2: (Sweden) Mattias Ekström; KYB Team JC
Final
- First: (Sweden) Johan Kristoffersson; Kristoffersson Motorsport
- Second: (Sweden) Mattias Ekström; KYB Team JC
- Third: (Germany) Timo Scheider; ALL-INKL.COM Münnich Motorsport

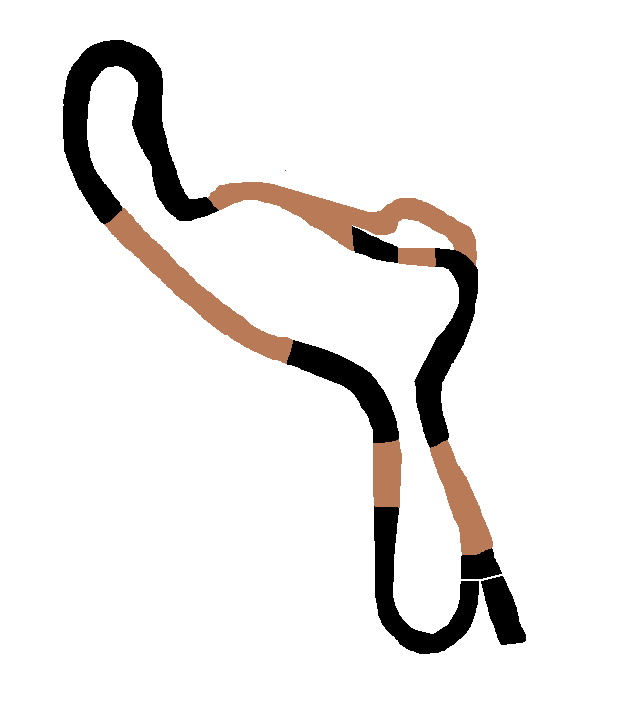
Rallycross layout of the Höljesbanan

2020 World RX of Sweden
- Round 2 of 8 in the 2020 FIA World Rallycross Championship
- Date: 23 August 2020
- Location: Höljes, Värmland
- Venue: Höljesbanan

Results
Heat winners
- Heat 1: (Sweden) Johan Kristoffersson; Kristoffersson Motorsport
- Heat 2: (Sweden) Mattias Ekström; KYB Team JC
- Heat 3: (Sweden) Johan Kristoffersson; Kristoffersson Motorsport
Semi-final winners
- Semi-final 1: (Sweden) Johan Kristoffersson; Kristoffersson Motorsport
- Semi-final 2: (Sweden) Robin Larsson; KYB Team JC
Final
- First: (Sweden) Mattias Ekström; KYB Team JC
- Second: (Sweden) Kevin Hansen; Team Hansen
- Third: (Sweden) Johan Kristoffersson; Kristoffersson Motorsport

The 2020 Swecon World RX of Sweden was the first and second round of the seventh season of the FIA World Rallycross Championship. The event was held at the Höljesbanan in the village of Höljes, Värmland.

Due to the COVID-19 pandemic, the event, originally planned as a "traditionalal sixth round", later became the first double header (two races in a weekend) of season.

== Supercar Race 1 ==
=== Heats ===
Pos.	No.	Driver	Team	Car	Q1	Q2	Q3	Pts
1	3	(Sweden) Johan Kristoffersson	Kristoffersson Motorsport	Volkswagen Polo	1st	6th	1st	16
2	5	(Sweden) Mattias Ekström	KYB Team JC	Audi S1	2nd	1st	8th	15
3	92	(Sweden) Anton Marklund	GCK Bilstein	Renault Mégane RS	5th	2nd	4th	14
4	1	(Sweden) Timmy Hansen	Team Hansen	Peugeot 208	8th	5th	2nd	13
5	4	(Sweden) Robin Larsson	KYB Team JC	Audi S1	3rd	4th	7th	12
6	9	(Sweden) Kevin Hansen	Team Hansen	Peugeot 208	6th	7th	3rd	11
7	68	(Finland) Niclas Grönholm	GRX Taneco Team	Hyundai i20	10th	3rd	6th	10
8	44	(Germany) Timo Scheider	ALL-INKL.COM Münnich Motorsport	Seat Ibiza	4th	8th	11th	9
9	123	(Hungary) Krisztián Szabó	GRX Set	Hyundai i20	9th	11th	5th	8
10	93	(Sweden) Sebastian Eriksson	Olsbergs MSE	Honda Civic Coupe	7th	9th	9th	7
11	14	(Lithuania) Rokas Baciuška	Unkorrupted	Renault Clio RS	12th	10th	13th	6
12	7	(Russia) Timur Timerzyanov	GRX Taneco Team	Hyundai i20	17th	12th	10th	4
13	13	(Norway) Andreas Bakkerud	Monster Energy GCK RX Cartel	Renault Mégane RS	14th	14th	12th	5
14	77	(Germany) René Münnich	ALL-INKL.COM Münnich Motorsport	Seat Ibiza	13th	13th	16th	3
15	11	(Finland) Jani Paasonen	Ferratum Team	Ford Fiesta	15th	15th	15th	2
16	36	(France) Guerlain Chicherit	Unkorrupted	Renault Clio RS	16th	16th	14th	1
17	33	(United Kingdom) Liam Doran	Monster Energy GCK RX Cartel	Renault Mégane RS	11th	DNS	DNS	

=== Semi-finals ===
Semi-Final 1

Pos.	No.	Driver	Team	Time	Pts
1	3	(Sweden) Johan Kristoffersson	Kristoffersson Motorsport	4:29.379	6
2	68	(Finland) Niclas Grönholm	GRX Taneco Team	+ 0.492	5
3	92	(Sweden) Anton Marklund	GCK Bilstein	+ 6.902	4
4	4	(Sweden) Robin Larsson	KYB Team JC	+ 7.341	3
5	123	(Hungary) Krisztián Szabó	GRX Set	+ 7.361	2
6	14	(Lithuania) Rokas Baciuška	Unkorrupted	DNF	1

Semi-Final 2

Pos.	No.	Driver	Team	Time	Pts
1	5	(Sweden) Mattias Ekström	KYB Team JC	4:29.361	6
2	1	(Sweden) Timmy Hansen	Team Hansen	+ 0.896	5
3	44	(Germany) Timo Scheider	ALL-INKL.COM Münnich Motorsport	+ 4.699	4
4	93	(Sweden) Sebastian Eriksson	Olsbergs MSE	+ 5.243	3
5	9	(Sweden) Kevin Hansen	Team Hansen	+ 6.485	2
6	7	(Russia) Timur Timerzyanov	GRX Taneco Team	+ 6.620	1

=== Final ===
Pos.	No.	Driver	Team	Time	Pts
1	3	(Sweden) Johan Kristoffersson	Kristoffersson Motorsport	5:05.943	8
2	5	(Sweden) Mattias Ekström	KYB Team JC	+ 4.201	5
3	44	(Germany) Timo Scheider	ALL-INKL.COM Münnich Motorsport	+ 17.755	4
4	68	(Finland) Niclas Grönholm	GRX Taneco Team	+ 19.419	3
5	92	(Sweden) Anton Marklund	GCK Bilstein	+ 38.135	2
6	1	(Sweden) Timmy Hansen	Team Hansen	DNF	1

== Supercar Race 2 ==
=== Heats ===
Pos.	No.	Driver	Team	Car	Q1	Q2	Q3	Pts
1	3	(Sweden) Johan Kristoffersson	Kristoffersson Motorsport	Volkswagen Polo	1st	2nd	1st	16
2	5	(Sweden) Mattias Ekström	KYB Team JC	Audi S1	2nd	1st	3rd	15
3	13	(Norway) Andreas Bakkerud	Monster Energy GCK RX Cartel	Renault Mégane RS	4th	6th	2nd	14
4	4	(Sweden) Robin Larsson	KYB Team JC	Audi S1	3rd	5th	4th	13
5	9	(Sweden) Kevin Hansen	Team Hansen	Peugeot 208	5th	3rd	5th	12
6	123	(Hungary) Krisztián Szabó	GRX Set	Hyundai i20	10th	7th	6th	11
7	92	(Sweden) Anton Marklund	GCK Bilstein	Renault Mégane RS	12th	4th	7th	10
8	44	(Germany) Timo Scheider	ALL-INKL.COM Münnich Motorsport	Seat Ibiza	6th	10th	9th	9
9	1	(Sweden) Timmy Hansen	Team Hansen	Peugeot 208	13th	9th	8th	8
10	68	(Finland) Niclas Grönholm	GRX Taneco Team	Hyundai i20	7th	12th	11th	7
11	7	(Russia) Timur Timerzyanov	GRX Taneco Team	Hyundai i20	8th	8th	16th	6
12	77	(Germany) René Münnich	ALL-INKL.COM Münnich Motorsport	Seat Ibiza	14th	13th	10th	5
13	36	(France) Guerlain Chicherit	Unkorrupted	Renault Clio RS	11th	14th	13th	4
14	14	(Lithuania) Rokas Baciuška	Unkorrupted	Renault Clio RS	16th	11th	12th	3
15	93	(Sweden) Sebastian Eriksson	Olsbergs MSE	Honda Civic Coupe	9th	16th	15th	2
16	11	(Finland) Jani Paasonen	Ferratum Team	Ford Fiesta	15th	15th	14th	1
17	33	(United Kingdom) Liam Doran	Monster Energy GCK RX Cartel	Renault Mégane RS	17th	17th	17th	

=== Semi-finals ===
Semi-Final 1

Pos.	No.	Driver	Team	Time	Pts
1	3	(Sweden) Johan Kristoffersson	Kristoffersson Motorsport	4:29.694	6
2	9	(Sweden) Kevin Hansen	Team Hansen	+ 1.812	5
3	13	(Norway) Andreas Bakkerud	Monster Energy GCK RX Cartel	+ 8.318	4
4	7	(Russia) Timur Timerzyanov	GRX Taneco Team	+ 8.525	3
5	92	(Sweden) Anton Marklund	GCK Bilstein	+ 10.166	2
	1	(Sweden) Timmy Hansen	Team Hansen	DQ	

Semi-Final 2

Pos.	No.	Driver	Team	Time	Pts
1	4	(Sweden) Robin Larsson	KYB Team JC	4:32.380	6
2	5	(Sweden) Mattias Ekström	KYB Team JC	+ 0.760	5
3	44	(Germany) Timo Scheider	ALL-INKL.COM Münnich Motorsport	+ 2.021	4
4	68	(Finland) Niclas Grönholm	GRX Taneco Team	+ 2.517	3
5	123	(Hungary) Krisztián Szabó	GRX Set	+ 7.273*	2
6	77	(Germany) Rene Munnich	ALL-INKL.COM Münnich Motorsport	DNF	1

*Krisztián Szabó originally finished fourth but later was penalised 5 sec time penalty

=== Final ===
Pos.	No.	Driver	Team	Time	Pts
1	5	(Sweden) Mattias Ekström	KYB Team JC	4:28.907	8
2	9	(Sweden) Kevin Hansen	Team Hansen	+ 3.029	5
3	3	(Sweden) Johan Kristoffersson	Kristoffersson Motorsport	+ 5.194*	4
4	44	(Germany) Timo Scheider	ALL-INKL.COM Münnich Motorsport	+ 9.615	3
5	4	(Sweden) Robin Larsson	KYB Team JC	+ 10.583	2
6	13	(Norway) Andreas Bakkerud	Monster Energy GCK RX Cartel	+ 31.949	1

*Johan Kristoffersson finished second, but was handed a five second time penalty immediately following the race after he was judged to have hit two track markers in the joker lap as he pushed hard to match Mattias Ekström

== Standings after the event ==
Pos.	Driver	Pts	Gap
1	(Sweden) Johan Kristoffersson	56	
2	(Sweden) Mattias Ekström	54	+2
3	(Sweden) Robin Larsson	36	+20
4	(Sweden) Kevin Hansen	35	+21
5	(Germany) Timo Scheider	33	+23
6	(Sweden) Anton Marklund	32	+24

- Note: Only the top six positions are included.

Previous race: 2019 World RX of South Africa	FIA World Rallycross Championship; 2020 season	Next race: 2020 World RX of Finland
Previous race: 2019 World RX of Sweden	World RX of Sweden	Next race: 2021 World RX of Sweden
