= 2020 World RX of Latvia =

Rallycross series held in Latvia

- Round 5 of 8 in the 2020 FIA World Rallycross Championship
- Date: 19 September 2020
- Location: Riga, Latvia
- Venue: Biķernieku Kompleksā Sporta Bāze

Results
Heat winners
- Heat 1: (Sweden) Johan Kristoffersson; Kristoffersson Motorsport
- Heat 2: (Finland) Niclas Grönholm; GRX Taneco Team
- Heat 3: (Sweden) Mattias Ekström; KYB Team JC
Semi-final winners
- Semi-final 1: (Sweden) Mattias Ekström; KYB Team JC
- Semi-final 2: (Sweden) Johan Kristoffersson; Kristoffersson Motorsport
Final
- First: (Sweden) Johan Kristoffersson; Kristoffersson Motorsport
- Second: (Sweden) Mattias Ekström; KYB Team JC
- Third: (Sweden) Timmy Hansen; Team Hansen

World RX layout of Biķernieku Kompleksā Sporta Bāze

2020 World RX of Latvia
- Round 6 of 8 in the 2020 FIA World Rallycross Championship
- Date: 20 September 2020
- Location: Riga, Latvia
- Venue: Biķernieku Kompleksā Sporta Bāze

Results
Heat winners
- Heat 1: (Sweden) Mattias Ekström; KYB Team JC
- Heat 2: (Sweden) Mattias Ekström; KYB Team JC
- Heat 3: (Sweden) Robin Larsson; KYB Team JC
Semi-final winners
- Semi-final 1: (Sweden) Mattias Ekström; KYB Team JC
- Semi-final 2: (Sweden) Johan Kristoffersson; Kristoffersson Motorsport
Final
- First: (Sweden) Mattias Ekström; KYB Team JC
- Second: (Sweden) Johan Kristoffersson; Kristoffersson Motorsport
- Third: (Sweden) Robin Larsson; KYB Team JC

The 2020 Neste World RX of Riga-Latvia was the fifth and sixth round of the seventh season of the FIA World Rallycross Championship. The event was held at Biķernieku Kompleksā Sporta Bāze, in the Latvian capital of Riga.

Due to the COVID-19 pandemic, the event, originally planned as a "normal event", later became a double header (two races in a weekend)

== Supercar Race 1 ==
=== Heats ===
Pos.	No.	Driver	Team	Car	Q1	Q2	Q3	Pts
1	68	(Finland) Niclas Grönholm	GRX Taneco Team	Hyundai i20	4th	1st	3rd	16
2	3	(Sweden) Johan Kristoffersson	Kristoffersson Motorsport	Volkswagen Polo	1st	3rd	6th	15
3	5	(Sweden) Mattias Ekström	KYB Team JC	Audi S1	5th	5th	1st	14
4	4	(Sweden) Robin Larsson	KYB Team JC	Audi S1	6th	4th	2nd	13
5	1	(Sweden) Timmy Hansen	Team Hansen	Peugeot 208	2nd	6th	4th	12
6	9	(Sweden) Kevin Hansen	Team Hansen	Peugeot 208	3rd	8th	7th	11
7	123	(Hungary) Kristian Szabo	GRX Set	Hyundai i20	10th	2nd	13th	10
8	33	(United Kingdom) Liam Doran	Monster Energy RX Cartel	Renault Mégane RS	7th	16th	5th	9
9	13	(Norway) Andreas Bakkerud	Monster Energy RX Cartel	Renault Mégane RS	9th	14th	8th	8
10	7	(Russia) Timur Timerzyanov	GRX Taneco Team	Hyundai i20	8th	9th	16th	7
11	15	(Latvia) Reinis Nitiss	ES Motorsport - Eigesa WRX Team	Skoda Fabia	11th	12th	11th	6
12	77	(Germany) René Münnich	ALL-INKL.COM Münnich Motorsport	Seat Ibiza	12th	10th	12th	5
13	44	(Germany) Timo Scheider	ALL-INKL.COM Münnich Motorsport	Seat Ibiza	17th	7th	10th	4
14	92	(Sweden) Anton Marklund	GCK Bilstein	Renault Mégane RS	16th	11th	9th	3
15	36	(France) Guerlain Chicherit	Unkorrupted	Renault Clio RS	13th	13th	14th	2
16	14	(Lithuania) Rokas Baciuska	Unkorrupted	Renault Clio RS	15th	15th	15th	1
17	11	(Finland) Jani Paasonen	Ferratum Team	Ford Fiesta	14th	17th	DNS	

Note : René Münnich withdrawn from semi Final to allow his more experienced teammate Timo Scheider to participate

=== Semi-finals ===
Semi-Final 1

Pos.	No.	Driver	Team	Time	Pts
1	5	(Sweden) Mattias Ekstrom	KYB Team JC	5:04.092	6
2	68	(Finland) Niclas Grönholm	GRX Taneco Team	+0.148	5
3	1	(Sweden) Timmy Hansen	Team Hansen	+2.165	4
4	13	(Norway) Andreas Bakkerud	Monster Energy RX Cartel	+4.305	3
5	15	(Latvia) Reinis Nitiss	ES Motorsport - Eisega WRX Team	+6.741	2
6	123	(Hungary) Kristian Szabo	GRX Set	+6.996	1

Semi-Final 2

Pos.	No.	Driver	Team	Time	Pts
1	3	(Sweden) Johan Kristoffersson	Kristoffersson Motorsport	5:02.654	6
2	4	(Sweden) Robin Larsson	KYB Team JC	+1.511	5
3	9	(Sweden) Kevin Hansen	Team Hansen	+2.133	4
4	44	(Germany) Timo Scheider	ALL-INKL.COM Münnich Motorsport	+5.208	3
5	7	(Russia) Timur Timerzyanov	GRX Taneco Team	+5.566	2
6	33	(United Kingdom) Liam Doran	Monster Energy RX Cartel	DNF	1

=== Final ===
Pos.	No.	Driver	Team	Time	Pts
1	3	(Sweden) Johan Kristoffersson	Kristoffersson Motorsport	5:01.073	8
2	5	(Sweden) Mattias Ekström	KYB Team JC	+3.468	5
3	1	(Sweden) Timmy Hansen	Team Hansen	+4.323	4
4	9	(Sweden) Kevin Hansen	Team Hansen	+4.633	3
5	68	(Finland) Niclas Grönholm	GRX Taneco Team	+10.908	2
6	4	(Sweden) Robin Larsson	KYB Team JC	+35.316	1

== Supercar Race 2 ==
=== Heats ===
Pos.	No.	Driver	Team	Car	Q1	Q2	Q3	Pts
1	5	(Sweden) Mattias Ekström	KYB Team JC	Audi S1	1st	1st	6th	16
2	3	(Sweden) Johan Kristoffersson	Kristoffersson Motorsport	Volkswagen Polo	4th	2nd	2nd	15
3	13	(Norway) Andreas Bakkerud	Monster Energy RX Cartel	Renault Mégane RS	6th	3rd	10th	14
4	1	(Sweden) Timmy Hansen	Team Hansen	Peugeot 208	3rd	6th	3rd	13
5	68	(Finland) Niclas Grönholm	GRX Taneco Team	Hyundai i20	5th	5th	7th	12
6	44	(Germany) Timo Scheider	ALL-INKL.COM Münnich Motorsport	Seat Ibiza	7th	7th	8th	11
7	4	(Sweden) Robin Larsson	KYB Team JC	Audi S1	2nd	15th	1st	10
8	7	(Russia) Timur Timerzyanov	GRX Taneco Team	Hyundai i20	11th	4th	14th	9
9	9	(Sweden) Kevin Hansen	Team Hansen	Peugeot 208	9th	8th	4th	8
10	92	(Sweden) Anton Marklund	GCK Bilstein	Renault Mégane RS	10th	9th	11th	7
11	15	(Latvia) Reinis Nitiss	ES Motorsport - Eigesa WRX Team	Skoda Fabia	13th	11th	13th	6
12	33	(United Kingdom) Liam Doran	Monster Energy RX Cartel	Renault Mégane RS	12th	13th	9th	5
13	77	(Germany) René Münnich	ALL-INKL.COM Münnich Motorsport	Seat Ibiza	16th	10th	12th	4
14	123	(Hungary) Kristian Szabo	GRX Set	Hyundai i20	8th	16th	5th	3
15	36	(France) Guerlain Chicherit	Unkorrupted	Renault Clio RS	15th	12th	16th	2
16	11	(Finland) Jani Paasonen	Ferratum Team	Ford Fiesta	17th	14th	17th	1
17	14	(Lithuania) Rokas Baciuska	Unkorrupted	Renault Clio RS	14th	17th	15th	

=== Semi-finals ===
Semi-Final 1

Pos.	No.	Driver	Team	Time	Pts
1	5	(Sweden) Mattias Ekstrom	KYB Team JC	5:01.505	6
2	4	(Sweden) Robin Larsson	KYB Team JC	+2.395	5
3	68	(Finland) Niclas Grönholm	GRX Taneco Team	+2.791	4
4	9	(Sweden) Kevin Hansen‡	Team Hansen	+3.197	3
5	7	(Russia) Timur Timerzyanov	GRX Taneco Team	+4.320	2
6	123	(Hungary) Kristian Szabo	GRX Set	+5.596	1

Semi-Final 2

(Red Flagged - Only 5 laps)‡

Pos.	No.	Driver	Team	Time	Pts
1	21	(Sweden) Johan Kristoffersson	Kristoffersson Motorsport	4:10.779	6
2	1	(Sweden) Timmy Hansen	Team Hansen	+2.708	5
3	13	(Norway) Andreas Bakkerud‡	Monster Energy RX Cartel	+3.727	4
4	92	(Sweden) Anton Marklund	GRX Bilstein	+6.299	3
5	33	(United Kingdom) Liam Doran	Monster Energy RX Cartel	+6.559	2
DQ	44	(Germany) Timo Scheider‡	ALL-INKL.COM Münnich Motorsport	DQ	-

‡ The semi-final 2 was red-flagged due to the crash of Andreas Bakkerud. Timo Scheider, who finish the semi-final in third, was declared responsible for the incident and was disqualified. Neither Andreas Bakkerud nor his car was able to resume the competition. As a result, his place in the final was filled by Kevin Hansen.

=== Final ===
Pos.	No.	Driver	Team	Time	Pts
1	5	(Sweden) Mattias Ekström	KYB Team JC	5:01.264	8
2	3	(Sweden) Johan Kristoffersson	Kristoffersson Motorsport	+0.728	5
3	4	(Sweden) Robin Larsson	KYB Team JC	+3.388	4
4	1	(Sweden) Timmy Hansen	Team Hansen	+3.814	3
5	68	(Finland) Niclas Grönholm	GRX Taneco Team	+4.647	2
6	9	(Sweden) Kevin Hansen	Team Hansen	+5.075	1

== Standings after the event ==
Pos.	Driver	Pts	Gap
1	(Sweden) Johan Kristoffersson	166	
2	(Sweden) Mattias Ekström	149	+17
3	(Finland) Niclas Grönholm	117	+49
4	(Sweden) Timmy Hansen	111	+55
5	(Sweden) Robin Larsson	101	+65
6	(Sweden) Kevin Hansen	96	+70

- Note: Only the top six positions are included.

Previous race: 2020 World RX of Finland	FIA World Rallycross Championship; 2020 season	Next race: 2020 World RX of Catalunya
Previous race: 2019 World RX of Latvia	World RX of Latvia	Next race: 2021 World RX of Latvia
