= Timur Timerzyanov =

Russian rallycross driver

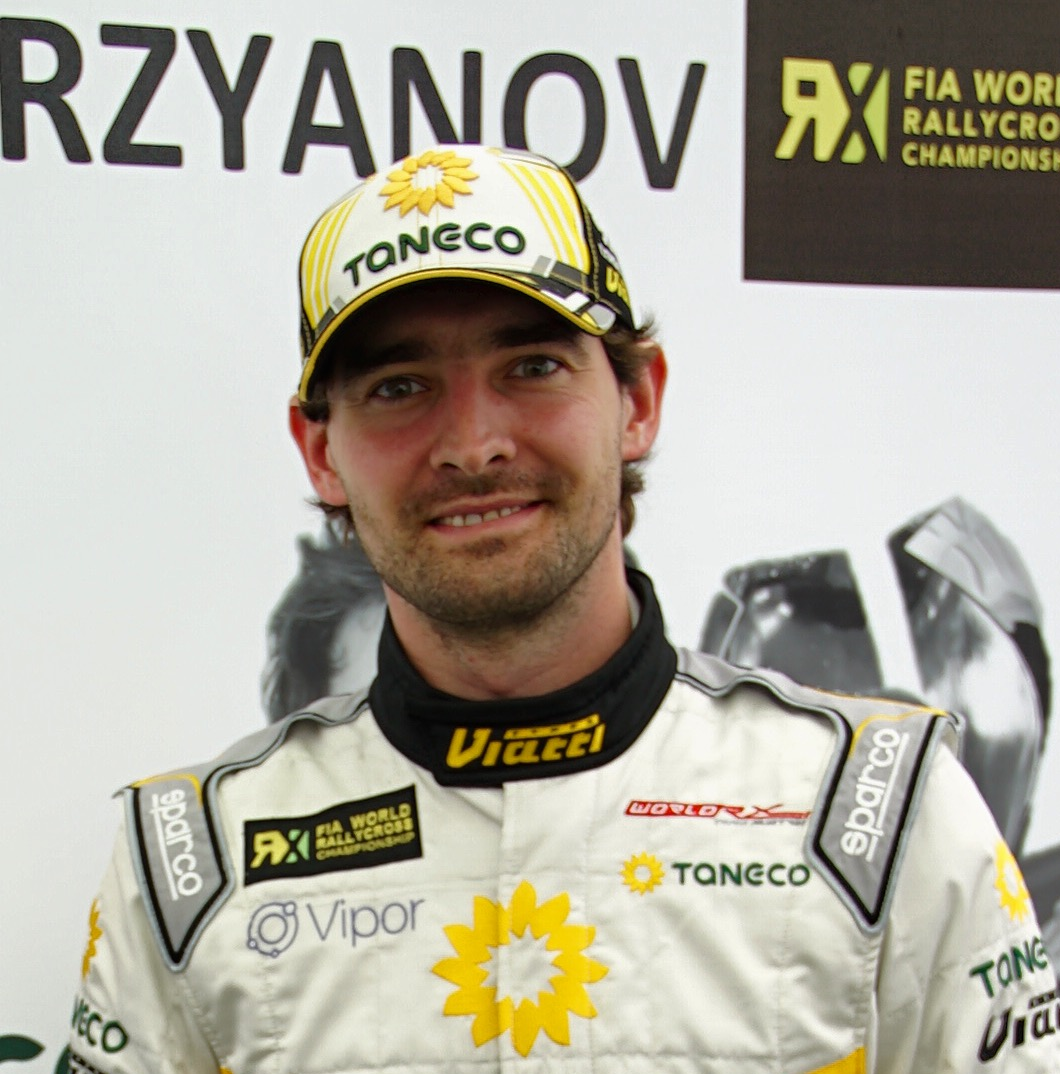
- Timerzyanov at the 2016 World RX of France
- Nationality: Russian
- Born: Timur Renatovich Timerzyanov; 31 January 1987 (age 39) Kazan, Tatar ASSR, Russian SFSR, Soviet Union

FIA World Rallycross Championship career
- Debut season: 2014 - 2020
- Car number: 7
- Former teams: Team Peugeot-Hansen; Namus OMSE; World RX Team Austria; STARD; GRX Taneco Team
- Starts: 79
- Wins: 1
- Podiums: 6
- Best finish: 5th in 2019
- Finished last season: 10th

FIA ERX Supercar Championship
- Years active: 2011–2013
- Former teams: Namus Hansen Motorsport
- Starts: 28
- Championships: 2 (2012, 2013)
- Wins: 7
- Podiums: 15

FIA ERX Division 1A Championship
- Years active: 2008–2010
- Former teams: Set Promotion
- Starts: 21
- Championships: 1 (2010)
- Wins: 5
- Podiums: 12

Timur Renatovich Timerzyanov (Russian: Тиму́р Рена́тович Тимерзя́нов; born 31 January 1987) is a Russian rallycross driver who previously competed in the FIA World Rallycross Championship. He has won the European Rallycross Division 1A Championship in 2010 with SET Promotion and the European Rallycross Division Supercar Championship in 2012 and 2013 with Hansen Motorsport.

Timerzyanov won his first World RX event in 2019. His team GRX also claimed the first victory.

== Racing record ==
=== Complete FIA European Rallycross Championship results ===
(key)

==== Division 1A ====
Year	Entrant	Car	1	2	3	4	5	6	7	8	9	10	11	ERX	Points
2008	Timur Timerzyanov	Peugeot 206	POR	FRA	HUN	AUT	NOR	SWE	BEL	NED	CZE	POL; 15	GER	58th	2
2009	Set Promotion	Renault Clio	GBR; 6	POR; 6	FRA; 2	HUN; 3	AUT; 2	SWE; 1	BEL; 11	GER; 12	POL; 3	CZE; 4		3rd	114
2010	Set Promotion	Renault Clio	POR; 1	FRA; 2	GBR; 5	HUN; 6	SWE; 1	FIN; 2	BEL; 1	GER; 5	POL; 1	CZE; 2		1st	143

==== Supercar ====
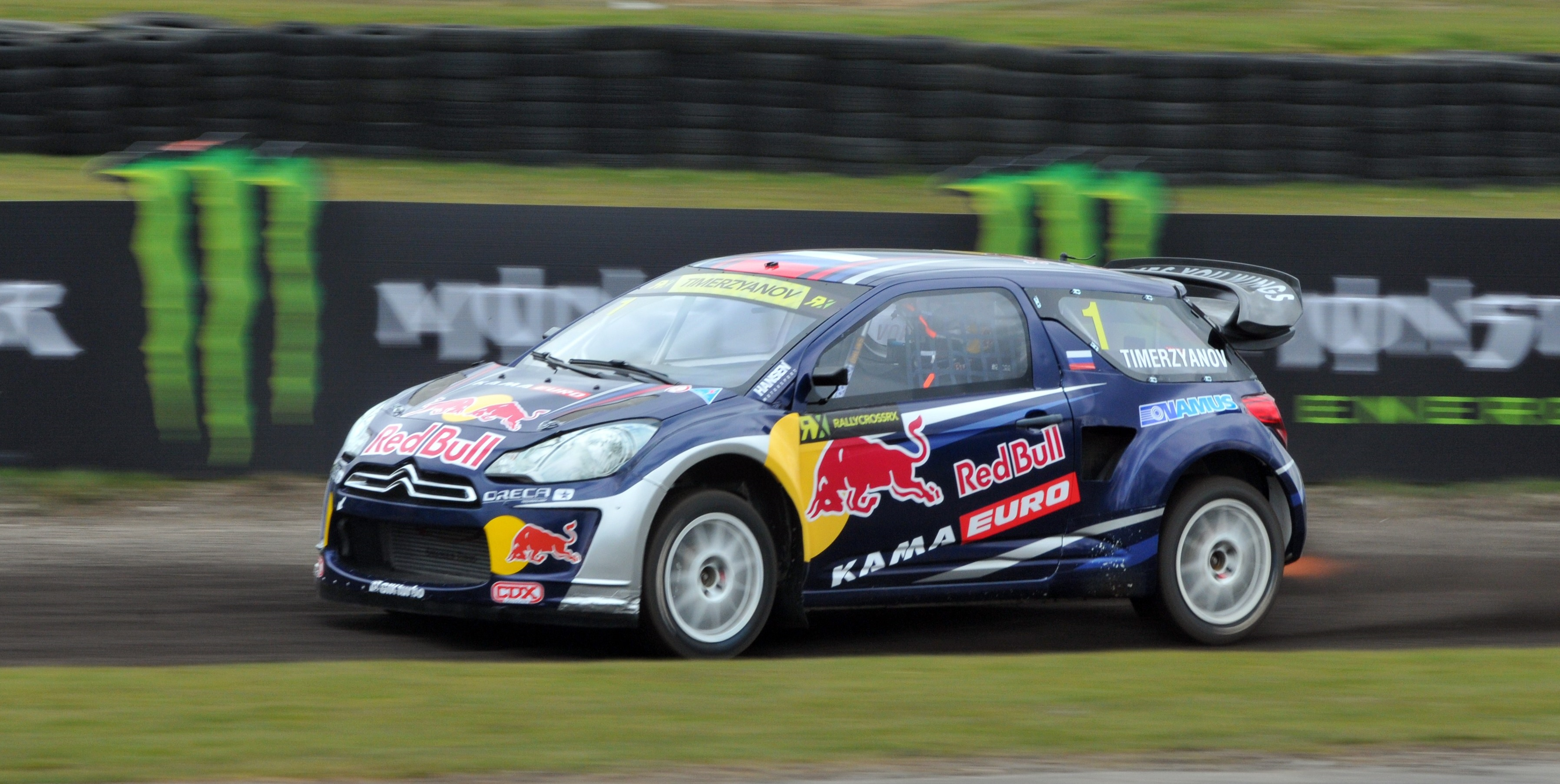
Timur Timerzyanov driving a Citroën DS3 in the 2013 European Rallycross Championship

Year	Entrant	Car	1	2	3	4	5	6	7	8	9	10	ERX	Points
2011	Namus Hansen Motorsport	Citroën C4 T16	GBR; 5	POR; 3	FRA; 5	NOR; 3	SWE; 15	BEL; 1	NED; 11	AUT; 2	POL; 7	CZE; 4	3rd	114
2012	Namus Hansen Motorsport	Citroën DS3 T16	GBR	FRA; 4	AUT; 1	HUN; 1	NOR; 3	SWE; 1	BEL; 1	NED; 1	FIN; 1	GER; 14	1st	148
2013	Namus Hansen Motorsport	Citroën DS3	GBR; 5	POR; 6	HUN; 2	FIN; 2	NOR; 2	SWE; 11	FRA; 4	AUT; 2	GER; 4		1st	185

=== Complete Global RallyCross Championship results ===
(key)

==== Supercar ====
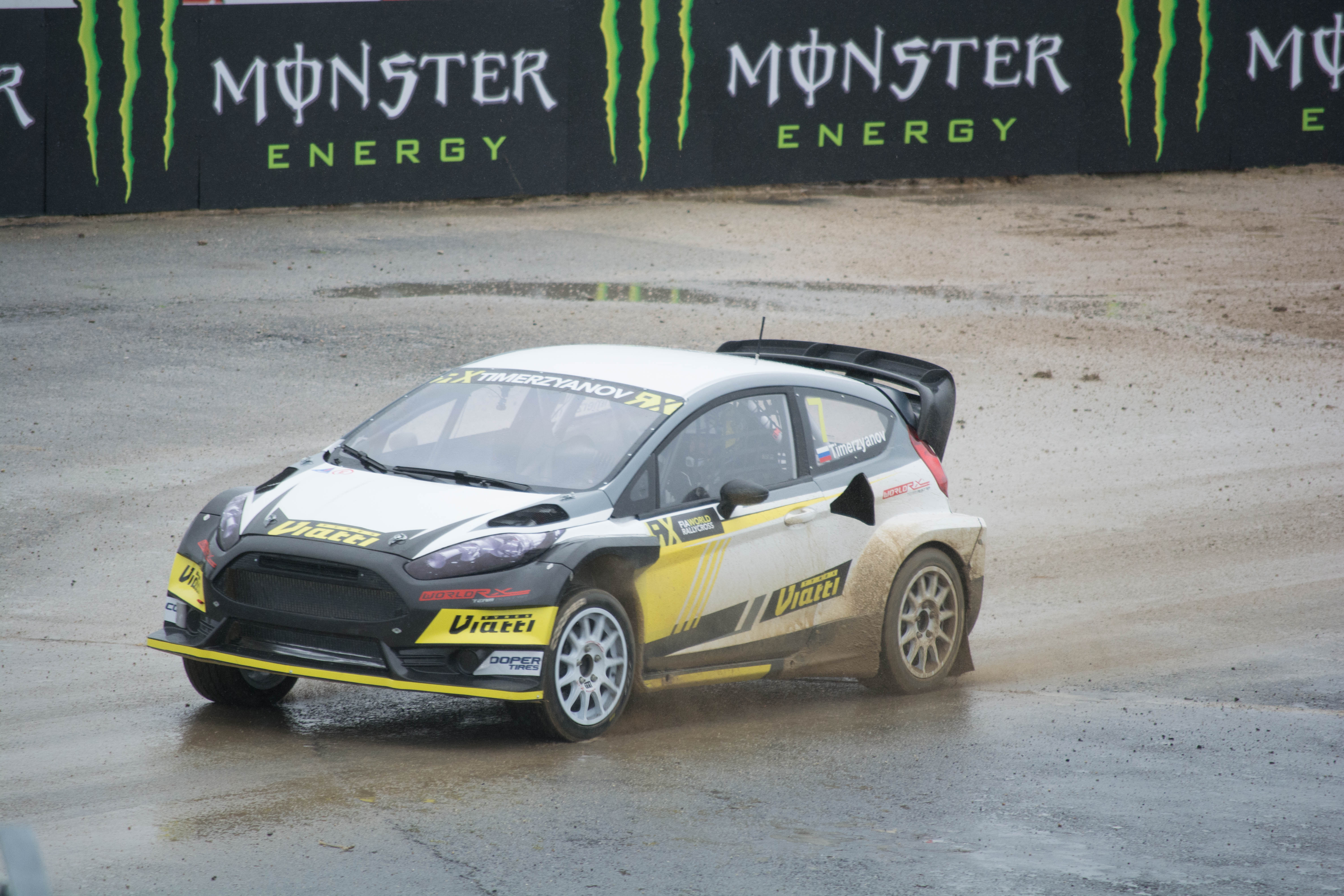
Timerzyanov competing in the 2016 World RX of Portugal with World RX Team Austria

Year	Entrant	Car	1	2	3	4	5	6	7	8	9	GRC	Points
2012	Olsbergs MSE	Ford Fiesta ST	CHA	TEX	LA	NH	LVS	LVC; 9				20th	9
2013	Pastrana Racing	Dodge Dart	BRA	MUN1; 10	MUN2; 12	LOU	BRI; 8		ATL; 5	CHA	LVS	14th	34
2013	Marklund Motorsport	Volkswagen Polo						LAN; 18				14th	34

=== Complete FIA World Rallycross Championship results ===
(key)

==== Supercar ====
Year	Entrant	Car	1	2	3	4	5	6	7	8	9	10	11	12	13	WRX	Points
2014	Team Peugeot-Hansen	Peugeot 208 T16	POR; 7	GBR; 29	NOR; 4	FIN; 11	SWE; 7	BEL; 7	CAN; 3	FRA; 6	GER; 7	ITA; 4	TUR; 8	ARG; 8		7th	152
2015	Namus OMSE	Ford Fiesta ST	POR; 10	HOC; 15	BEL; 13	GBR; 18	GER; 11	SWE; 7	CAN; 13	NOR; 6	FRA; 10	BAR; 11	TUR; 9	ITA; 6	ARG; 17	10th	105
2016	World RX Team Austria	Ford Fiesta	POR; 16	HOC; 17	BEL; 8	GBR; 5	NOR; 6	SWE; 14	CAN; 7	FRA; 30	BAR; 3	LAT; 6	GER; 14	ARG; 9		8th	117
2017	STARD	Ford Fiesta	BAR; 20	POR; 9	HOC; 9	BEL; 10	GBR; 11	NOR; 6	SWE; 11	CAN; 11	FRA; 15	LAT; 13	GER; 17	RSA; 13		13th	78
2018	GRX Taneco Team	Hyundai i20	BAR; 10	POR; 12	BEL; 8	GBR; 12	NOR; 21	SWE; 8	CAN; 11	FRA; 9	LAT; 11	USA; 13	GER; 20	RSA; 11		10th	86
2019	GRX Taneco Team	Hyundai i20	ABU; 7	BAR; 7	BEL; 1	GBR; 11	NOR; 7	SWE; 24	CAN; 3	FRA; 10	LAT; 5	RSA; 3				5th	142
2020	GRX Taneco	Hyundai i20	SWE; 12	SWE; 10	FIN; 10	FIN; 3	LAT; 10	LAT; 8	ESP; 7	ESP; 10						10th	81

Sporting positions
Preceded by Mats Lysen	European Rallycross Division 1A Champion; 2010	Succeeded by None
Preceded by Sverre Isachsen	European Rallycross Supercar Champion; 2012-2013	Succeeded by Robin Larsson
