= Multitude SE =

FinTech company

- Company type: Public company
- Industry: Financial services
- Founded: May 1, 2005; 20 years ago
- Founder: Jorma Jokela
- Headquarters: Helsinki, Finland
- Key people: Jorma Jokela, CEO
- Products: Mobile Banking, SME Loans, Consumer Loans
- Brands: Multitude, SweepBank, CapitalBox and Ferratum
- Website: multitude.com

Multitude SE (formerly Ferratum) is a European lender headquartered in Helsinki, Finland.

== Company History ==
Multitude was founded in 2005 by Jorma Jokela, who has been its CEO since the company's foundation. Multitude was listed on the Frankfurt Stock Exchange on February 6, 2015.

== Commerce Commission court case ==
In June 2020, Multitude settled a claim over alleged breaches of the lender responsibility principles in New Zealand, distributing a total of $88,173 in borrowing costs across 46 customers. In 2021, the Australian Securities and Investments Commission said that Ferratum Australia had charged illegal fees and overcharged some customers who paid their loan early. On April 4, 2023, Ferratum Australia's shareholders voted to enter liquidation.

== Operations ==
As of 2024, the Multitude Group’s business consisted of three divisions: Ferratum (consumer banking), CapitalBox (SME banking), and Wholesale Banking. The SweepBank mobile banking app, which previously operated as a separate unit, was integrated into Ferratum and CapitalBox.

In 2024, Ferratum provided consumer loans in Finland and 12 other European countries.

CapitalBox offered loans and financial services to SMEs in Finland and four other countries in 2024.

Wholesale Banking, established in 2024, operates under the Multitude Bank brand. The division provides secured debt financing as well as payment solutions to other banks and payment institutions.
