= 2016 Euro RX of Sweden =

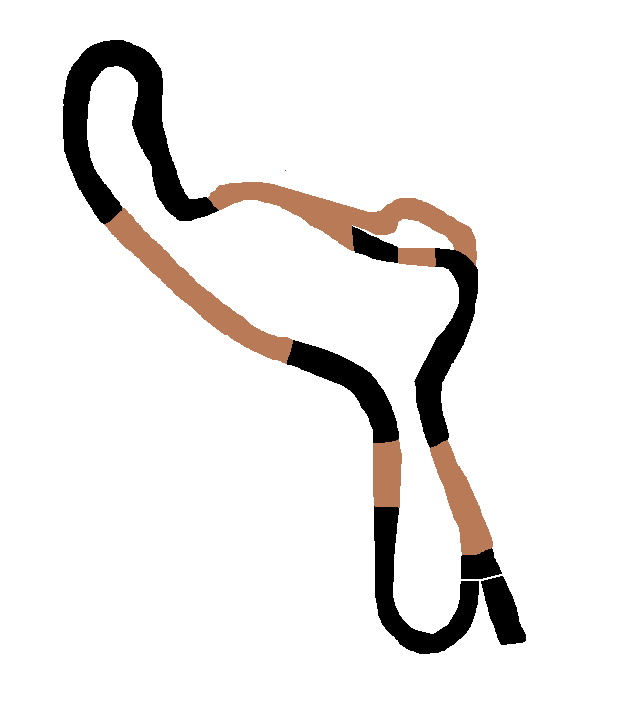
Rallycross layout of the Höljesbanan

The 2016 Euro RX of Sweden is the fifth round of the forty-first season of the FIA European Rallycross Championship. The event was held at the Höljesbanan in the village of Höljes, Värmland as an undercard to the 2016 World RX of Sweden, and was the only event on the 2016 calendar to have all three categories running.

== Supercar ==
=== Heats ===
Pos.	No.	Driver	Team	Car	Q1	Q2	Q3	Q4	Pts
1	71	(Sweden) Kevin Hansen	Peugeot Hansen Academy	Peugeot 208	1st	2nd	5th	2nd	16
2	11	(Sweden) Fredrik Salsten	Fredrik Salsten	Peugeot 208	3rd	19th	3rd	1st	15
3	147	(Hungary) Tamás Pál Kiss	Speed box Közhasznú Egyesület	Peugeot 208	6th	1st	8th	10th	14
4	99	(Norway) Tord Linnerud	Tord Linnerud	Volkswagen Polo	7th	3rd	7th	8th	13
5	8	(Sweden) Peter Hedström	Hedströms Motorsport	Ford Fiesta	4th	5th	6th	9th	12
6	54	(Sweden) Mats Öhman	Öhman Racing	Ford Fiesta	2nd	23rd	2nd	7th	11
7	74	(France) Jérôme Grosset-Janin	Albatec Racing	Peugeot 208	12th	4th	10th	11th	10
8	26	(United Kingdom) Andy Scott	Albatec Racing	Peugeot 208	8th	8th	18th	4th	9
9	53	(Norway) Alexander Hvaal	Per Eklund Motorsport	Volkswagen Beetle	23rd	21st	1st	3rd	8
10	102	(Hungary) Tamás Kárai	Racing-Com KFT	Audi A1	16th	18th	4th	5th	7
11	111	(Republic of Ireland) Derek Tohill	OlsbergsMSE	Ford Fiesta	9th	17th	9th	12th	6
12	24	(Norway) Tommy Rustad	Albatec Racing	Peugeot 208	5th	7th	11th	15th	5
13	124	(Hungary) "Csucsu"	Speedy Motorsport	Ford Focus	15th	11th	17th	6th	4
14	31	(Austria) Max Pucher	World RX Team Austria	Ford Fiesta	14th	15th	15th	13th	3
15	60	(Finland) Joni-Pekka Rajala	Per Eklund Motorsport	Volkswagen Beetle	11th	6th	16th	17th	2
16	28	(Belgium) Jochen Coox	Oud-Turnhout Rally Team VZW	Volkswagen Polo	20th	12th	13th	14th	1
17	2	(Republic of Ireland) Oliver O'Donovan	Oliver O'Donovan	Ford Fiesta	17th	9th	14th	16th	
18	80	(Germany) Andreas Steffen	Andreas Steffen	Ford Fiesta	13th	10th	23rd	19th	
19	30	(Norway) Ole Kristian Temte	Ole Kristian Temte	Citroën C4	21st	14th	19th	18th	
20	69	(Poland) Martin Kaczmarski	Lotto Team	Ford Fiesta	19th	13th	12th	24th	
21	16	(Norway) Tom Daniel Tånevik	Tom Daniel Tånevik	Volvo C30	10th	16th	20th	20th	
22	48	(Sweden) Lukas Walfridson	Helmia Motorsport	Renault Clio	22nd	20th	21st	21st	
23	12	(Finland) Riku Tahko	#MiniSuomi	BMW MINI Countryman	18th	22nd	22nd	22nd	
24	97	(United Kingdom) Mark Flaherty	Mark Flaherty	Ford Focus	24th	24th	24th	23rd	

=== Semi-finals ===
Semi-final 1

Pos.	No.	Driver	Team	Time/Retired	Pts
1	71	(Sweden) Kevin Hansen	Peugeot Hansen Academy	4:50.507	6
2	53	(Norway) Alexander Hvaal	Per Eklund Motorsport	+1.698	5
3	147	(Hungary) Tamás Pál Kiss	Speed box Közhasznú Egyesület	+2.445	4
4	74	(France) Jérôme Grosset-Janin	Albatec Racing	+3.867	3
5	111	(Republic of Ireland) Derek Tohill	OlsbergsMSE	+30.289	2
Ret	8	(Sweden) Peter Hedström	Hedströms Motorsport		1

Semi-final 2

Pos.	No.	Driver	Team	Time/Retired	Pts
1	11	(Sweden) Fredrik Salsten	Fredrik Salsten	4:49.841	6
2	99	(Norway) Tord Linnerud	Tord Linnerud	+1.942	5
3	24	(Norway) Tommy Rustad	Albatec Racing	+2.436	4
4	54	(Sweden) Mats Öhman	Öhman Racing	+3.220	3
5	102	(Hungary) Tamás Kárai	Racing-Com KFT	+34.661	2
Ret	26	(United Kingdom) Andy Scott	Albatec Racing		1

=== Final ===
Pos.	No.	Driver	Team	Time/Retired	Pts
1	71	(Sweden) Kevin Hansen	Peugeot Hansen Academy	4:45.728	8
2	11	(Sweden) Fredrik Salsten	Fredrik Salsten	+1.584	5
3	24	(Norway) Tommy Rustad	Albatec Racing	+9.220	4
4	99	(Norway) Tord Linnerud	Tord Linnerud	+13.531	3
5	53	(Norway) Alexander Hvaal	Per Eklund Motorsport	+14.085	2
DSQ	147	(Hungary) Tamás Pál Kiss	Speed box Közhasznú Egyesület		

== Standings after the event ==
Supercar standings

Pos	Pilot	Pts	Gap
1	(Sweden) Kevin Hansen	87	
2	(Norway) Tord Linnerud	64	+23
3	(France) Jérôme Grosset-Janin	58	+29
4	(Sweden) Fredrik Salsten	49	+38
5	(Norway) Tommy Rustad	46	+41

Super1600 standings

Pos	Driver	Pts	Gap
1	(Denmark) Ulrik Linnemann	62	
2	(Hungary) Krisztián Szabó	61	+1
3	(Russia) Timur Shigabutdinov	52	+10
4	(Latvia) Artis Baumanis	45	+17
5	(Estonia) Janno Ligur	37	+25

TouringCar standings

Pos	Driver	Pts	Gap
1	(Norway) Ben-Philip Gundersen	72	
2	(Sweden) Magda Andersson	61	+11
3	(Norway) Fredrik Magnussen	54	+18
4	(Norway) Per-Magne Røyrås	51	+21
5	(Norway) Anders Bråten	44	+28

- Note: Only the top five positions are included for both sets of standings.

Previous race: 2016 Euro RX of Norway	FIA European Rallycross; Championship; 2016 season	Next race: 2016 Euro RX of France
