= 2016 Euro RX of Latvia =

Rallycross series held in Latvia

World RX layout of Biķernieku Kompleksā Sporta Bāze

The 2016 Euro RX of Latvia was the eighth round of the forty-first season of the FIA European Rallycross Championship. The event was held at the Biķernieku Kompleksā Sporta Bāze in Riga, Latvia as an undercard to the 2016 World RX of Latvia and was contested by the Supercar (fifth and final round) and Super1600 (fourth round) classes. It was the first ever European Rallycross round held in Latvia.

== Supercar ==
=== Heats ===
Pos.	No.	Driver	Team	Car	Q1	Q2	Q3	Q4	Pts
1	71	(Sweden) Kevin Hansen	Peugeot Hansen Academy	Peugeot 208	1st	1st	1st	17th	16
2	8	(Sweden) Peter Hedström	Hedströms Motorsport	Volkswagen Polo	5th	5th	2nd	1st	15
3	74	(France) Jérôme Grosset-Janin	Albatec Racing	Peugeot 208	2nd	3rd	5th	3rd	14
4	24	(Norway) Tommy Rustad	Albatec Racing	Peugeot 208	3rd	4th	4th	2nd	13
5	147	(Hungary) Tamás Pál Kiss	Speed box Közhasznú Egyesület	Peugeot 208	12th	2nd	3rd	4th	12
6	11	(Sweden) Fredrik Salsten	Fredrik Salsten	Peugeot 208	4th	8th	6th	5th	11
7	69	(Poland) Martin Kaczmarski	Lotto Team	Ford Fiesta	11th	7th	10th	7th	10
8	53	(Norway) Alexander Hvaal	Per Eklund Motorsport	Volkswagen Beetle	8th	11th	7th	9th	9
9	111	(Republic of Ireland) Derek Tohill	OlsbergsMSE	Ford Fiesta	9th	12th	9th	8th	8
10	99	(Norway) Tord Linnerud	Tord Linnerud	Volkswagen Polo	6th	10th	18th	6th	7
11	102	(Hungary) Tamás Kárai	Racing-Com KFT	Audi A1	7th	9th	14th	13th	6
12	2	(Republic of Ireland) Oliver O'Donovan	Oliver O'Donovan	Ford Fiesta	15th	14th	8th	10th	5
13	26	(United Kingdom) Andy Scott	Albatec Racing	Peugeot 208	10th	18th	11th	15th	4
14	16	(Norway) Tom Daniel Tånevik	Tom Daniel Tånevik	Volvo C30	14th	17th	13th	11th	3
15	80	(Germany) Andreas Steffen	Andreas Steffen	Ford Fiesta	13th	19th	12th	18th	2
16	54	(Sweden) Mats Öhman	Norbottens Bildemontering	Ford Fiesta	17th	15th	16th	14th	1
17	95	(Estonia) Andri Õun	Reinsalu Sport	Ford Fiesta	16th	16th	17th	16th	
18	60	(Finland) Joni-Pekka Rajala	Per Eklund Motorsport	Volkswagen Beetle	19th	6th	15th	12th	
19	12	(Finland) Riku Tahko	#MiniSuomi	BMW MINI Countryman	18th	13th	19th	19th	

=== Semi-finals ===
Semi-final 1

Pos.	No.	Driver	Team	Time/Retired	Pts
1	74	(France) Jérôme Grosset-Janin	Albatec Racing	5:43.067	6
2	71	(Sweden) Kevin Hansen	Peugeot Hansen Academy	+0.826	5
3	147	(Hungary) Tamás Pál Kiss	Speed box Közhasznú Egyesület	+3.566	4
4	69	(Poland) Martin Kaczmarski	Lotto Team	+6.477	3
Ret	102	(Hungary) Tamás Kárai	Racing-Com KFT		2
DSQ	111	(Republic of Ireland) Derek Tohill	OlsbergsMSE		

Semi-final 2

Pos.	No.	Driver	Team	Time/Retired	Pts
1	24	(Norway) Tommy Rustad	Albatec Racing	5:47.339	6
2	8	(Sweden) Peter Hedström	Hedströms Motorsport	+3.113	5
3	99	(Norway) Tord Linnerud	Tord Linnerud	+6.042	4
4	2	(Republic of Ireland) Oliver O'Donovan	Oliver O'Donovan	+6.888	3
Ret	53	(Norway) Alexander Hvaal	Per Eklund Motorsport		2
DSQ	11	(Sweden) Fredrik Salsten	Fredrik Salsten		

=== Final ===
Pos.	No.	Driver	Team	Time/Retired	Pts
1	24	(Norway) Tommy Rustad	Albatec Racing	5:45.303	8
2	71	(Sweden) Kevin Hansen	Peugeot Hansen Academy	+0.722	5
3	147	(Hungary) Tamás Pál Kiss	Speed box Közhasznú Egyesület	+2.267	4
4	74	(France) Jérôme Grosset-Janin	Albatec Racing	+3.138	3
5	8	(Sweden) Peter Hedström	Hedströms Motorsport	+4.163	2
6	99	(Norway) Tord Linnerud	Tord Linnerud	+13.016	1

== Standings after the event ==
Supercar standings

Pos	Driver	Pts	Gap
1	(Sweden) Kevin Hansen	143	
2	(France) Jérôme Grosset-Janin	105	+38
3	(Norway) Tord Linnerud	99	+44
4	(Norway) Tommy Rustad	94	+49
5	(Hungary) Tamás Pál Kiss	78	+65

TouringCar standings

Pos	Driver	Pts	Gap
1	(Norway) Ben-Philip Gundersen	88	
2	(Sweden) Magda Andersson	81	+7
3	(Norway) Fredrik Magnussen	78	+10
4	(Norway) Per-Magne Røyrås	70	+18
5	(Sweden) Philip Gehrman	61	+27

- Note: Only the top five positions are included for both sets of standings.

Previous race: 2016 Euro RX of Barcelona	FIA European Rallycross; Championship; 2016 season	Next race: 2016 Euro RX of Germany
