= 2016 Euro RX of Belgium =

World RX layout of Circuit Jules Tacheny Mettet

The 2016 Euro RX of Belgium was the second round of the forty-first season of the FIA European Rallycross Championship. The event was held at the Circuit Jules Tacheny Mettet in Mettet, Wallonia as an undercard to the 2016 World RX of Belgium and hosted the Supercar and TouringCar classes.

== Supercar ==
=== Heats ===
Pos.	No.	Driver	Team	Car	Q1	Q2	Q3	Q4	Pts
1	74	(France) Jérôme Grosset-Janin	Albatec Racing	Peugeot 208	1st	1st	1st	1st	16
2	60	(Finland) Joni-Pekka Rajala	Per Eklund Motorsport	Volkswagen Beetle	3rd	4th	6th	5th	15
3	99	(Norway) Tord Linnerud	Tord Linnerud	Volkswagen Polo	4th	5th	5th	7th	14
4	71	(Sweden) Kevin Hansen	Peugeot Hansen Academy	Peugeot 208	20th	2nd	3rd	2nd	13
5	10	(Hungary) Tamás Kárái	Racing-Com KFT	Audi A1	11th	3rd	10th	4th	12
6	14	(Hungary) Tamas Pal Kiss	Speed box Közhasznú Egyesület	Peugeot 208	5th	6th	2nd	19th	11
7	24	(Norway) Tommy Rustad	Albatec Racing	Peugeot 208	2nd	10th	18th	11th	10
8	12	(Hungary) "Csucsu"	Speedy Motorsport	Ford Focus	7th	7th	7th	18th	9
9	69	(Poland) Martin Kaczmarski	Lotto Team	Ford Fiesta	9th	16th	9th	9th	8
10	53	(Norway) Alexander Hvaal	Per Eklund Motorsport	Volkswagen Beetle	12th	13th	8th	10th	7
11	111	(Republic of Ireland) Derek Tohill	OlsbergsMSE	Ford Fiesta	8th	9th	14th	17th	6
12	79	(Poland) Krzysztof Hołowczyc	Lotto Team	Ford Fiesta	10th	11th	20th	3rd	5
13	11	(Sweden) Frederik Salsten	Frederik Salsten	Peugeot 208	6th	21st	4th	15th	4
14	8	(Sweden) Peter Hedström	Hedströms Motorsport	Ford Fiesta	17th	19th	12th	6th	3
15	16	(Norway) Tom Daniel Tånevik	Tom Daniel Tånevik	Volvo C30	16th	15th	11th	13th	2
16	31	(Austria) Max Pucher	World RX Team Austria	Ford Fiesta	14th	14th	16th	12th	1
17	49	(Belgium) "M.D.K."	"M.D.K."	Ford Fiesta	13th	8th	17th	20th	
18	87	(France) Jean-Baptiste Dubourg	DA Racing	Citroën DS3	23rd	18th	15th	8th	
19	20	(France) Fabien Pailler	Pailler Competition	Peugeot 208	18th	12th	21st	16th	
20	12	(Finland) Riku Tahko	#MiniSuomi	BMW MINI Countryman	19th	22nd	19th	21st	
21	54	(Sweden) Mats Öhman	Öhman Racing	Ford Fiesta	21st	25th	13th	14th	
22	97	(United Kingdom) Mark Flaherty	Mark Flaherty	Ford Focus	15th	17th	25th	25th	
23	72	(Denmark) Ulrik Linnemann	Ulrik Linnemann	Peugeot 208	22nd	20th	22nd	22nd	
24	30	(Norway) Ole Kristian Temte	Ole Kristian Temte	Citroën C4	24th	23rd	23rd	23rd	
25	28	(Belgium) Jochen Coox	Oud-Turnhout Rally Team VZW	Volkswagen Polo	25th	24th	24th	24th	

=== Semi-finals ===
Semi-final 1

Pos.	No.	Driver	Team	Time/Retired	Pts
1	74	(France) Jérôme Grosset-Janin	Albatec Racing	4:07.741	6
2	99	(Norway) Tord Linnerud	Tord Linnerud	+1.721	5
3	24	(Norway) Tommy Rustad	Albatec Racing	+4.789	4
4	102	(Hungary) Tamás Kárái	Racing-Com KFT	+6.247	3
5	69	(Poland) Martin Kaczmarski	Lotto Team	+12.466	2
6	111	(Republic of Ireland) Derek Tohill	OlsbergsMSE	+14.817	1

Semi-final 2

Pos.	No.	Driver	Team	Time/Retired	Pts
1	71	(Sweden) Kevin Hansen	Peugeot Hansen Academy	4:06.344	6
2	60	(Finland) Joni-Pekka Rajala	Per Eklund Motorsport	+3.488	5
3	124	(Hungary) "Csucsu"	Speedy Motorsport	+14.298	4
4	79	(Poland) Krzysztof Hołowczyc	Lotto Team	+14.713	3
Ret	53	(Norway) Alexander Hvaal	Per Eklund Motorsport		2
Ret	147	(Hungary) Tamas Pal Kiss	Speed box Közhasznú Egyesület		1

=== Final ===
Pos.	No.	Driver	Team	Time/Retired	Pts
1	71	(Sweden) Kevin Hansen	Peugeot Hansen Academy	4:04.186	8
2	74	(France) Jérôme Grosset-Janin	Albatec Racing	+1.440	5
3	99	(Norway) Tord Linnerud	Tord Linnerud	+7.592	4
4	124	(Hungary) "Csucsu"	Speedy Motorsport	+12.248	3
5	24	(Norway) Tommy Rustad	Albatec Racing	+12.652	2
Ret	60	(Finland) Joni-Pekka Rajala	Per Eklund Motorsport		1

== TouringCar ==
=== Heats ===
Pos.	No.	Driver	Team	Car	Q1	Q2	Q3	Q4	Pts
1	2	(Norway) David Nordgård	David Nordgård	Ford Fiesta	1st	3rd	3rd	7th	16
2	12	(Norway) Fredrik Magnussen	Fredrik Magnussen	Ford Fiesta	9th	5th	1st	2nd	15
3	14	(Belgium) Danny de Beuckelaer	Oud-Turnhout Rally Team VZW	Volvo C30	2nd	2nd	8th	9th	14
4	16	(Norway) Ben-Philip Gundersen	Ben-Philip Gundersen	Ford Fiesta	6th	4th	4th	4th	13
5	6	(Sweden) Daniel Lundh	Daniel Lundh	Volvo C30	11th	1st	2nd	14th	12
6	5	(Norway) Per-Magne Røyrås	Per-Magne Røyrås	Mazda RX-8	4th	7th	7th	6th	11
7	7	(Sweden) Magda Andersson	Valvoline RX Team	Ford Fiesta	13th	6th	15th	1st	10
8	15	(Norway) Camilla Antonsen	Camilla Antonsen	Ford Fiesta	8th	16th	9th	5th	9
9	4	(Norway) Kjetil Larsen	Bridgestone Motorsport	Škoda Fabia	12th	14th	14th	3rd	8
10	19	(Norway) Aleksander Bjørnstad	Aleksander Bjørnstad	Ford Fiesta	5th	10th	17th	8th	7
11	3	(Norway) Anders Bråten	Anders Bråten	Ford Fiesta	10th	17th	5th	10th	6
12	88	(Netherlands) Mandy Kasse	Mandy Kasse	Ford Fiesta	15th	9th	11th	11th	5
13	73	(Norway) Torleif Haugenes Lona	Torleif Haugenes Lona	Ford Fiesta	3rd	8th	16th	17th	4
14	83	(Sweden) Sören Hedlund	Sören Hedlund	Toyota Auris	14th	12th	12th	12th	3
15	55	(Norway) Christian Sandmo	Christian Sandmo	Mazda RX-8	16th	11th	6th	15th	2
16	11	(Norway) Steinar Stokke	Steinar Stokke	Mazda RX-8	7th	15th	10th	16th	1
17	56	(Netherlands) Jo van de Ven	Jo van de Ven	Volkswagen Polo	18th	13th	13th	13th	
18	95	(Sweden) Philip Gehrman	Bridgestone Motorsport	Ford Fiesta	17th	18th	18th	18th	

=== Semi-finals ===
Semi-final 1

Pos.	No.	Driver	Team	Time/Retired	Pts
1	2	(Norway) David Nordgård	David Nordgård	4:33.884	6
2	7	(Sweden) Magda Andersson	Valvoline RX Team	+4.917	5
3	6	(Sweden) Daniel Lundh	Daniel Lundh	+6.420	4
Ret	3	(Norway) Anders Bråten	Anders Bråten		3
DNS	4	(Norway) Kjetil Larsen	Bridgestone Motorsport		2
DNS	14	(Belgium) Danny de Beuckelaer	Oud-Turnhout Rally Team VZW		1

Semi-final 2

Pos.	No.	Driver	Team	Time/Retired	Pts
1	16	(Norway) Ben-Philip Gundersen	Ben-Philip Gundersen	4:35.902	6
2	5	(Norway) Per-Magne Røyrås	Per-Magne Røyrås	+2.690	5
3	12	(Norway) Fredrik Magnussen	Fredrik Magnussen	+10.030	4
4	15	(Norway) Camilla Antonsen	Camilla Antonsen	+12,622	3
5	88	(Netherlands) Mandy Kasse	Mandy Kasse	+16.535	2
Ret	19	(Norway) Aleksander Bjørnstad	Aleksander Bjørnstad		1

=== Final ===
Pos.	No.	Driver	Team	Time/Retired	Pts
1	7	(Sweden) Magda Andersson	Valvoline RX Team	4:31.811	8
2	12	(Norway) Fredrik Magnussen	Fredrik Magnussen	+0.198	5
3	16	(Norway) Ben-Philip Gundersen	Ben-Philip Gundersen	+2.742	4
4	6	(Sweden) Daniel Lundh	Daniel Lundh	+7.399	3
Ret	5	(Norway) Per-Magne Røyrås	Per-Magne Røyrås		2
DNS	2	(Norway) David Nordgård	David Nordgård		1

== Standings after the event ==
Supercar standings

Pos	Pilot	Pts	Gap
1	(Sweden) Kevin Hansen	27	
1	(France) Jérôme Grosset-Janin	27	
3	(Norway) Tord Linnerud	23	+4
4	(Finland) Joni-Pekka Rajala	21	+6
5	(Hungary) "Csucsu"	16	+11
5	(Norway) Tommy Rustad	16	+11

TouringCar standings

Pos	Driver	Pts	Gap
1	(Norway) Fredrik Magnussen	24	
2	(Norway) Ben-Philip Gundersen	23	+1
2	(Norway) David Nordgård	23	+1
2	(Sweden) Magda Andersson	23	+1
5	(Sweden) Daniel Lundh	19	+5

- Note: Only the top five positions are included for both sets of standings.

Previous race: 2016 Euro RX of Portugal	FIA European Rallycross; Championship; 2016 season	Next race: 2016 Euro RX of Great Britain
