= 2016 Euro RX of Norway =

World RX layout of Lånkebanen

The 2016 Euro RX of Norway was the fourth round of the forty-first season of the FIA European Rallycross Championship. The event was held at the Lånkebanen near Hell, Nord-Trøndelag as an undercard to the 2016 World RX of Norway, and hosted the Supercar and TouringCar classes.

== Supercar ==
=== Heats ===
| Pos. | No. | Driver | Team | Car | Q1 | Q2 | Q3 | Q4 | Pts |
|---|---|---|---|---|---|---|---|---|---|
| 1 | 71 | (Sweden) Kevin Hansen | Peugeot Hansen Academy | Peugeot 208 | 1st | 1st | 1st | 1st | 16 |
| 2 | 147 | (Hungary) Tamás Pál Kiss | Speed box Közhasznú Egyesület | Peugeot 208 | 2nd | 8th | 2nd | 2nd | 15 |
| 3 | 24 | (Norway) Tommy Rustad | Albatec Racing | Peugeot 208 | 3rd | 2nd | 3rd | 3rd | 14 |
| 4 | 11 | (Sweden) Fredrik Salsten | Fredrik Salsten | Peugeot 208 | 5th | 6th | 4th | 5th | 13 |
| 5 | 74 | (France) Jérôme Grosset-Janin | Albatec Racing | Peugeot 208 | 4th | 4th | 5th | 10th | 12 |
| 6 | 99 | (Norway) Tord Linnerud | Tord Linnerud | Volkswagen Polo | 8th | 3rd | 10th | 6th | 11 |
| 7 | 8 | (Sweden) Peter Hedström | Hedströms Motorsport | Ford Fiesta | 6th | 5th | 18th | 8th | 10 |
| 8 | 69 | (Poland) Martin Kaczmarski | Lotto Team | Ford Fiesta | 13th | 11th | 6th | 9th | 9 |
| 9 | 60 | (Finland) Joni-Pekka Rajala | Per Eklund Motorsport | Volkswagen Beetle | 7th | 9th | 8th | 15th | 8 |
| 10 | 79 | (Poland) Krzysztof Hołowczyc | Lotto Team | Ford Fiesta | 10th | 12th | 11th | 7th | 7 |
| 11 | 2 | (Republic of Ireland) Oliver O'Donovan | Oliver O'Donovan | Ford Fiesta | 11th | 7th | 14th | 11th | 6 |
| 12 | 54 | (Sweden) Mats Öhman | Öhman Racing | Ford Fiesta | 14th | 15th | 17th | 4th | 5 |
| 13 | 53 | (Norway) Alexander Hvaal | Per Eklund Motorsport | Volkswagen Beetle | 12th | 10th | 7th | 20th | 4 |
| 14 | 31 | (Austria) Max Pucher | World RX Team Austria | Ford Fiesta | 15th | 13th | 16th | 12th | 3 |
| 15 | 16 | (Norway) Tom Daniel Tånevik | Tom Daniel Tånevik | Volvo C30 | 17th | 14th | 13th | 13th | 2 |
| 16 | 102 | (Hungary) Tamás Kárai | Racing-Com KFT | Audi A1 | 18th | 16th | 9th | 14th | 1 |
| 17 | 111 | (Republic of Ireland) Derek Tohill | OlsbergsMSE | Ford Fiesta | 16th | 17th | 12th | 17th | |
| 18 | 124 | (Hungary) "Csucsu" | Speedy Motorsport | Ford Focus | 21st | 18th | 19th | 16th | |
| 19 | 30 | (Norway) Ole Kristian Temte | Ole Kristian Temte | Citroën C4 | 19th | 20th | 20th | 18th | |
| 20 | 24 | (United Kingdom) Andy Scott | Albatec Racing | Peugeot 208 | 9th | 19th | 15th | 21st | |
| 21 | 97 | (United Kingdom) Mark Flaherty | Mark Flaherty | Ford Focus | 20th | 22nd | 21st | 19th | |
| 22 | 12 | (Finland) Riku Tahko | #MiniSuomi | BMW MINI Countryman | 22nd | 21st | 22nd | 22nd | |
| 23 | 49 | (Belgium) "M.D.K." | "M.D.K." | Ford Fiesta | 23rd | 23rd | 23rd | 23rd | |

=== Semi-finals ===
Semi-final 1

| Pos. | No. | Driver | Team | Time/Retired | Pts |
|---|---|---|---|---|---|
| 1 | 71 | (Sweden) Kevin Hansen | Peugeot Hansen Academy | 3:59.621 | 6 |
| 2 | 8 | (Sweden) Peter Hedström | Hedströms Motorsport | +5.153 | 5 |
| 3 | 74 | (France) Jérôme Grosset-Janin | Albatec Racing | +5.533 | 4 |
| 4 | 24 | (Norway) Tommy Rustad | Albatec Racing | +29.651 | 3 |
| Ret | 60 | (Finland) Joni-Pekka Rajala | Per Eklund Motorsport | | 2 |
| EXC | 2 | (Republic of Ireland) Oliver O'Donovan | Oliver O'Donovan | | |

Semi-final 2

| Pos. | No. | Driver | Team | Time/Retired | Pts |
|---|---|---|---|---|---|
| 1 | 147 | (Hungary) Tamás Pál Kiss | Speed box Közhasznú Egyesület | 3:59.975 | 6 |
| 2 | 11 | (Sweden) Fredrik Salsten | Fredrik Salsten | +1.082 | 5 |
| 3 | 99 | (Norway) Tord Linnerud | Tord Linnerud | +4.365 | 4 |
| 4 | 54 | (Sweden) Mats Öhman | Öhman Racing | +7.034 | 3 |
| 5 | 69 | (Poland) Martin Kaczmarski | Lotto Team | +8.741 | 2 |
| 6 | 79 | (Poland) Krzysztof Hołowczyc | Lotto Team | +10.974 | 1 |

=== Final ===
| Pos. | No. | Driver | Team | Time/Retired | Pts |
|---|---|---|---|---|---|
| 1 | 71 | (Sweden) Kevin Hansen | Peugeot Hansen Academy | 4:07.089 | 8 |
| 2 | 99 | (Norway) Tord Linnerud | Tord Linnerud | +5.243 | 5 |
| 3 | 147 | (Hungary) Tamás Pál Kiss | Speed box Közhasznú Egyesület | +10.672 | 4 |
| 4 | 8 | (Sweden) Peter Hedström | Hedströms Motorsport | +19.864 | 3 |
| Ret | 74 | (France) Jérôme Grosset-Janin | Albatec Racing | | 2 |
| Ret | 11 | (Sweden) Fredrik Salsten | Fredrik Salsten | | 1 |

== TouringCar ==
=== Heats ===
| Pos. | No. | Driver | Team | Car | Q1 | Q2 | Q3 | Q4 | Pts |
|---|---|---|---|---|---|---|---|---|---|
| 1 | 3 | (Norway) Anders Bråten | Anders Bråten | Ford Fiesta | 11th | 2nd | 4th | 1st | 16 |
| 2 | 55 | (Norway) Christian Sandmo | Christian Sandmo | Mazda RX-8 | 5th | 5th | 2nd | 2nd | 15 |
| 3 | 95 | (Sweden) Philip Gehrman | Bridgestone Motorsport | Ford Fiesta | 1st | 1st | 13th | 4th | 14 |
| 4 | 7 | (Sweden) Magda Andersson | Valvoline RX Team | Ford Fiesta | 4th | 4th | 7th | 3rd | 13 |
| 5 | 16 | (Norway) Ben-Philip Gundersen | Ben-Philip Gundersen | Ford Fiesta | 10th | 10th | 1st | 5th | 12 |
| 6 | 12 | (Norway) Fredrik Magnussen | Fredrik Magnussen | Ford Fiesta | 2nd | 3rd | 14th | 7th | 11 |
| 7 | 11 | (Norway) Steinar Stokke | Steinar Stokke | Mazda RX-8 | 8th | 11th | 3rd | 6th | 10 |
| 8 | 5 | (Norway) Per-Magne Røyrås | Per-Magne Røyrås | Mazda RX-8 | 3rd | 7th | 6th | 12th | 9 |
| 9 | 73 | (Norway) Torleif Haugenes Lona | Torleif Haugenes Lona | Ford Fiesta | 6th | 8th | 8th | 8th | 8 |
| 10 | 6 | (Sweden) Daniel Lundh | Daniel Lundh | Volvo C30 | 7th | 6th | 10th | 11th | 7 |
| 11 | 19 | (Norway) Aleksander Bjornstad | Aleksander Bjornstad | Ford Fiesta | 15th | 12th | 5th | 10th | 6 |
| 12 | 86 | (Norway) Petter Brauten | Petter Brauten | Opel Corsa | 9th | 16th | 11th | 9th | 5 |
| 13 | 2 | (Norway) David Nordgård | David Nordgård | Ford Fiesta | 13th | 9th | 9th | 16th | 4 |
| 14 | 83 | (Sweden) Sören Hedlund | Sören Hedlund | Toyota Auris | 12th | 15th | 12th | 14th | 3 |
| 15 | 4 | (Norway) Kjetil Larsen | Bridgestone Motorsport | Škoda Fabia | 14th | 13th | 15th | 13th | 2 |
| 16 | 15 | (Norway) Camilla Antonsen | Camilla Antonsen | Ford Fiesta | 16th | 14th | 16th | 15th | 1 |
| 17 | 78 | (Norway) Kai-Arne Homme | Kai-Arne Homme | Ford Focus | 17th | 17th | 17th | 17th | |

=== Semi-finals ===
Semi-final 1

| Pos. | No. | Driver | Team | Time/Retired | Pts |
|---|---|---|---|---|---|
| 1 | 95 | (Sweden) Philip Gehrman | Bridgestone Motorsport | 4:21.014 | 6 |
| 2 | 3 | (Norway) Anders Bråten | Anders Bråten | +2.020 | 5 |
| 3 | 16 | (Norway) Ben-Philip Gundersen | Ben-Philip Gundersen | +3.255 | 4 |
| 4 | 73 | (Norway) Torleif Haugenes Lona | Torleif Haugenes Lona | +5.266 | 3 |
| 5 | 19 | (Norway) Aleksander Bjornstad | Aleksander Bjornstad | +17.072 | 2 |
| Ret | 11 | (Norway) Steinar Stokke | Steinar Stokke | | 1 |

Semi-final 2

| Pos. | No. | Driver | Team | Time/Retired | Pts |
|---|---|---|---|---|---|
| 1 | 5 | (Norway) Per-Magne Røyrås | Per-Magne Røyrås | 4:25.508 | 6 |
| 2 | 12 | (Norway) Fredrik Magnussen | Fredrik Magnussen | +0.294 | 5 |
| 3 | 6 | (Sweden) Daniel Lundh | Daniel Lundh | +3.405 | 4 |
| 4 | 55 | (Norway) Christian Sandmo | Christian Sandmo | +18.332 | 3 |
| Ret | 86 | (Norway) Petter Brauten | Petter Brauten | | 2 |
| Ret | 7 | (Sweden) Magda Andersson | Valvoline RX Team | | 1 |

=== Final ===
| Pos. | No. | Driver | Team | Time/Retired | Pts |
|---|---|---|---|---|---|
| 1 | 95 | (Sweden) Philip Gehrman | Bridgestone Motorsport | 4:21.550 | 8 |
| 2 | 5 | (Norway) Per-Magne Røyrås | Per-Magne Røyrås | +1.460 | 5 |
| 3 | 12 | (Norway) Fredrik Magnussen | Fredrik Magnussen | +1.800 | 4 |
| 4 | 16 | (Norway) Ben-Philip Gundersen | Ben-Philip Gundersen | +3.652 | 3 |
| 5 | 6 | (Sweden) Daniel Lundh | Daniel Lundh | +5.284 | 2 |
| Ret | 3 | (Norway) Anders Bråten | Anders Bråten | | 1 |

== Standings after the event ==
Supercar standings

| Pos | Pilot | Pts | Gap |
|---|---|---|---|
| 1 | (Sweden) Kevin Hansen | 57 | |
| 2 | (France) Jérôme Grosset-Janin | 45 | +12 |
| 3 | (Norway) Tord Linnerud | 43 | +14 |
| 4 | (Hungary) Tamás Pál Kiss | 37 | +20 |
| 5 | (Norway) Tommy Rustad | 33 | +24 |

TouringCar standings

| Pos | Driver | Pts | Gap |
|---|---|---|---|
| 1 | (Norway) Fredrik Magnussen | 44 | |
| 2 | (Norway) Ben-Philip Gundersen | 42 | +2 |
| 3 | (Norway) Per-Magne Røyrås | 38 | +6 |
| 4 | (Sweden) Magda Andersson | 37 | +7 |
| 5 | (Sweden) Daniel Lundh | 32 | +12 |

- Note: Only the top five positions are included for both sets of standings.

| Previous race: 2016 Euro RX of Great Britain | FIA European Rallycross; Championship; 2016 season | Next race: 2016 Euro RX of Sweden |
