= 2016 Euro RX of Barcelona =

Rallycross layout of the Circuit de Catalunya

The 2016 Euro RX of Barcelona was the seventh round of the forty-first season of the FIA European Rallycross Championship. The event was held at the Circuit de Barcelona-Catalunya in Montmeló, Barcelona as an undercard to the 2016 World RX of Barcelona and was contested by the Supercar (fourth round) and Super1600 (fifth round) classes.

== Supercar ==
=== Heats ===
| Pos. | No. | Driver | Team | Car | Q1 | Q2 | Q3 | Q4 | Pts |
|---|---|---|---|---|---|---|---|---|---|
| 1 | 71 | (Sweden) Kevin Hansen | Peugeot Hansen Academy | Peugeot 208 | 1st | 1st | 1st | 6th | 16 |
| 2 | 74 | (France) Jérôme Grosset-Janin | Albatec Racing | Peugeot 208 | 4th | 9th | 2nd | 2nd | 15 |
| 3 | 99 | (Norway) Tord Linnerud | Tord Linnerud | Volkswagen Polo | 8th | 2nd | 3rd | 9th | 14 |
| 4 | 8 | (Sweden) Peter Hedström | Hedströms Motorsport | Volkswagen Polo | 6th | 19th | 4th | 1st | 13 |
| 5 | 11 | (Sweden) Fredrik Salsten | Fredrik Salsten | Peugeot 208 | 2nd | 5th | 9th | 11th | 12 |
| 6 | 24 | (Norway) Tommy Rustad | Albatec Racing | Peugeot 208 | 3rd | 20th | 5th | 3rd | 11 |
| 7 | 147 | (Hungary) Tamás Pál Kiss | Speed box Közhasznú Egyesület | Peugeot 208 | 5th | 3rd | 18th | 7th | 10 |
| 8 | 53 | (Norway) Alexander Hvaal | Per Eklund Motorsport | Volkswagen Beetle | 7th | 4th | 7th | 14th | 9 |
| 9 | 69 | (Poland) Martin Kaczmarski | Lotto Team | Ford Fiesta | 11th | 7th | 6th | 10th | 8 |
| 10 | 102 | (Hungary) Tamás Kárai | Racing-Com KFT | Audi A1 | 16th | 6th | 10th | 5th | 7 |
| 11 | 2 | (Republic of Ireland) Oliver O'Donovan | Oliver O'Donovan | Ford Fiesta | 14th | 12th | 14th | 4th | 6 |
| 12 | 26 | (United Kingdom) Andy Scott | Albatec Racing | Peugeot 208 | 10th | 10th | 8th | 16th | 5 |
| 13 | 124 | (Hungary) "Csucsu" | Speedy Motorsport | Ford Focus | 15th | 13th | 11th | 13th | 4 |
| 14 | 54 | (Sweden) Mats Öhman | Norbottens Bildemontering | Ford Fiesta | 12th | 16th | 13th | 15th | 3 |
| 15 | 49 | (Belgium) "M.D.K." | "M.D.K." | Ford Fiesta | 9th | 14th | 12th | 19th | 2 |
| 16 | 111 | (Republic of Ireland) Derek Tohill | OlsbergsMSE | Ford Fiesta | 13th | 8th | 15th | 20th | 1 |
| 17 | 12 | (Finland) Riku Tahko | #MiniSuomi | BMW MINI Countryman | 18th | 15th | 19th | 8th | |
| 18 | 16 | (Norway) Tom Daniel Tånevik | Tom Daniel Tånevik | Volvo C30 | 17th | 18th | 17th | 12th | |
| 19 | 60 | (Finland) Joni-Pekka Rajala | Per Eklund Motorsport | Volkswagen Beetle | 20th | 11th | 20th | 18th | |
| 20 | 80 | (Germany) Andreas Steffen | Andreas Steffen | Ford Fiesta | 19th | 17th | 16th | 17th | |
| 21 | 87 | (France) Jean-Baptiste Dubourg | DA Racing | Citroën DS3 | 21st | 21st | 21st | 21st | |

=== Semi-finals ===
Semi-final 1

| Pos. | No. | Driver | Team | Time/Retired | Pts |
|---|---|---|---|---|---|
| 1 | 71 | (Sweden) Kevin Hansen | Peugeot Hansen Academy | 5:04.127 | 6 |
| 2 | 99 | (Norway) Tord Linnerud | Tord Linnerud | +4.389 | 5 |
| 3 | 11 | (Sweden) Fredrik Salsten | Fredrik Salsten | +5.775 | 4 |
| 4 | 147 | (Hungary) Tamás Pál Kiss | Speed box Közhasznú Egyesület | +6.309 | 3 |
| Ret | 69 | (Poland) Martin Kaczmarski | Lotto Team | | 2 |
| DSQ | 2 | (Republic of Ireland) Oliver O'Donovan | Oliver O'Donovan | | |

Semi-final 2

| Pos. | No. | Driver | Team | Time/Retired | Pts |
|---|---|---|---|---|---|
| 1 | 74 | (France) Jérôme Grosset-Janin | Albatec Racing | 5:03.582 | 6 |
| 2 | 24 | (Norway) Tommy Rustad | Albatec Racing | +4.023 | 5 |
| 3 | 8 | (Sweden) Peter Hedström | Hedströms Motorsport | +4.621 | 4 |
| 4 | 102 | (Hungary) Tamás Kárai | Racing-Com KFT | +7.550 | 3 |
| 5 | 53 | (Norway) Alexander Hvaal | Per Eklund Motorsport | +9.228 | 2 |
| 6 | 26 | (United Kingdom) Andy Scott | Albatec Racing | +12.677 | 1 |

=== Final ===
| Pos. | No. | Driver | Team | Time/Retired | Pts |
|---|---|---|---|---|---|
| 1 | 71 | (Sweden) Kevin Hansen | Peugeot Hansen Academy | 5:00.761 | 8 |
| 2 | 24 | (Norway) Tommy Rustad | Albatec Racing | +2.829 | 5 |
| 3 | 99 | (Norway) Tord Linnerud | Tord Linnerud | +4.849 | 4 |
| 4 | 74 | (France) Jérôme Grosset-Janin | Albatec Racing | +10.767 | 3 |
| 5 | 8 | (Sweden) Peter Hedström | Hedströms Motorsport | +11.319 | 2 |
| 6 | 11 | (Sweden) Fredrik Salsten | Fredrik Salsten | +37.727 | 1 |

== Standings after the event ==
Supercar standings

| Pos | Driver | Pts | Gap |
|---|---|---|---|
| 1 | (Sweden) Kevin Hansen | 117 | |
| 2 | (Norway) Tord Linnerud | 87 | +30 |
| 3 | (France) Jérôme Grosset-Janin | 82 | +35 |
| 4 | (Norway) Tommy Rustad | 67 | +50 |
| 5 | (Sweden) Fredrik Salsten | 66 | +51 |

Super1600 standings

| Pos | Driver | Pts | Gap |
|---|---|---|---|
| 1 | (Denmark) Ulrik Linnemann | 114 | |
| 2 | (Hungary) Krisztián Szabó | 108 | +6 |
| 3 | (Russia) Timur Shigabutdinov | 71 | +43 |
| 4 | (Latvia) Artis Baumanis | 64 | +50 |
| 5 | (Estonia) Janno Ligur | 62 | +52 |

- Note: Only the top five positions are included for both sets of standings.

| Previous race: 2016 Euro RX of France | FIA European Rallycross; Championship; 2016 season | Next race: 2016 Euro RX of Latvia |
