= 2016 Euro RX of Portugal =

The 2016 Euro RX of Portugal was the first round of the forty-first season of the FIA European Rallycross Championship. The event was held at the Pista Automóvel de Montalegre in Montalegre, Vila Real, and was contested by the Super1600 class.

== Super1600 ==
=== Heats ===
Pos.	No.	Driver	Team	Car	Q1	Q2	Q3	Q4	Pts
1	10	(Estonia) Janno Ligur	Janno Ligur	Škoda Fabia	1st	3rd	4th	2nd	16
2	76	(Portugal) Mário Barbosa	Mário Barbosa	Citroën Saxo	5th	1st	5th	5th	15
3	23	(Hungary) Krisztián Szabó	TQS Hungary KFT	Škoda Fabia	3rd	2nd	11th	4th	14
4	21	(Norway) Magnus Bergsjobrenden	SET Promotion	Renault Twingo	20th	8th	2nd	3rd	13
5	5	(Czech Republic) Ondrej Smetana	LS Racing Czech Republic Team	Ford Fiesta	10th	4th	13th	6th	12
6	7	(Lithuania) Ernestas Staponkus	Vilkyciai ASK	Volkswagen Polo	8th	5th	8th	12th	11
7	2	(Denmark) Ulrik Linnemann	Ulrik Linnemann	Peugeot 208	17th	13th	10th	1st	10
8	9	(Norway) Glenn Haug	Glenn Haug	Citroën C2	2nd	21st	16th	14th	9
9	87	(Russia) Dimitrii Malakhov	TT Motorsport	Renault Twingo	6th	25th	12th	9th	8
10	89	(Russia) Timur Shigabutdinov	SET Promotion	Renault Twingo	11th	16th	9th	17th	7
11	73	(France) Rudolf Schafer	Rudolf Schafer	Peugeot 208	14th	19th	7th	15th	6
12	8	(Norway) Espen Isaksćtre	Espen Isaksćtre	Citroën Saxo	16th	11th	20th	10th	5
13	98	(Russia) Egor Sanin	TT Motorsport	Lada Kalina	7th	29th	6th	11th	4
14	3	(Czech Republic) Pavel Vimmer	Diana Czech National Team	Škoda Fabia	25th	10th	18th	8th	3
15	20	(Estonia) Siim Saluri	RS Racing	Renault Twingo	19th	6th	22nd	22nd	2
16	79	(Portugal) Ricardo Soares	Ricardo Soares	Citroën Saxo	24th	7th	21st	18th	1
17	97	(Norway) Ada-Marie Hvaal	Ada-Marie Hvaal	Citroën C2	13th	24th	15th	19th	
18	6	(Lithuania) Kasparas Navickas	Všl Dakaras LT	Škoda Fabia	21st	23rd	1st	29th	
19	17	(Latvia) Artis Baumanis	SET Promotion	Renault Twingo	18th	32nd	3rd	7th	
20	47	(Estonia) Andre Kurg	Reinsalu Sport	Ford Ka	4th	12th	31st	23rd	
21	19	(Hungary) "Luigi"	GFS Motorsport Egyesület	Škoda Fabia	22nd	17th	14th	20th	
22	77	(Portugal) Mario Teixeira	Mario Teixeira	Ford Fiesta	23rd	20th	17th	13th	
23	78	(Portugal) Joaquim Machado	Joaquim Machado	Peugeot 206	27th	22nd	19th	16th	
24	18	(United Kingdom) Michael Boak	Michael Boak	Citroën C2	9th	28th	23rd	24th	
25	15	(Hungary) Gergely Marton	M-F Motorsport KFT	Škoda Fabia	12th	14th	28th	30th	
26	12	(Denmark) Daniel Nielsen	Ulrik Linnemann	Peugeot 208	15th	27th	24th	26th	
27	22	(Portugal) Helder Ribeiro	Helder Ribeiro	Citroën C2	31st	9th	25th	27th	
28	81	(Italy) Mirko Zanni	Mirko Zanni	Renault Clio	30th	15th	29th	21st	
29	101	(Hungary) Zsolt Szíjj	Speedy Motorsport	Suzuki Swift	29th	18th	26th	25th	
30	62	(United Kingdom) Philip Chicken	Philip Chicken	Citroën C2	32nd	26th	27th	28th	
31	90	(Sweden) Anitra Nilsen	NMS Sporting	Ford Fiesta	28th	31st	30th	31st	
32	24	(United Kingdom) Craig Lomax	Craig Lomax	Citroën C2	26th	30th	32nd	32nd	

=== Semi-finals ===
Semi-final 1

Pos.	No.	Driver	Team	Time/Retired	Pts
1	23	(Hungary) Krisztián Szabó	TQS Hungary KFT	4:41.281	6
2	2	(Denmark) Ulrik Linnemann	Ulrik Linnemann	+1.881	5
3	10	(Estonia) Janno Ligur	Janno Ligur	+2.551	4
4	5	(Czech Republic) Ondrej Smetana	LS Racing Czech Republic Team	+11.762	3
5	87	(Russia) Dimitrii Malakhov	TT Motorsport	+13.393	2
6	73	(France) Rudolf Schafer	Rudolf Schafer	+13.956	1

Semi-final 2

Pos.	No.	Driver	Team	Time/Retired	Pts
1	89	(Russia) Timur Shigabutdinov	SET Promotion	4:39.619	6
2	76	(Portugal) Mário Barbosa	Mário Barbosa	+3.460	5
3	21	(Norway) Magnus Bergsjobrenden	SET Promotion	+4.230	4
4	8	(Norway) Espen Isaksćtre	Espen Isaksćtre	+5.347	3
5	7	(Lithuania) Ernestas Staponkus	Vilkyciai ASK	+6.944	2
6	9	(Norway) Glenn Haug	Glenn Haug	+15.874	1

=== Final ===
Pos.	No.	Driver	Team	Time/Retired	Pts
1	2	(Denmark) Ulrik Linnemann	Ulrik Linnemann	4:23.092	8
2	76	(Portugal) Mário Barbosa	Mário Barbosa	+1.357	5
3	89	(Russia) Timur Shigabutdinov	SET Promotion	+2.930	4
4	10	(Estonia) Janno Ligur	Janno Ligur	+3.480	3
5	23	(Hungary) Krisztián Szabó	TQS Hungary KFT	+4.655	2
6	21	(Norway) Magnus Bergsjobrenden	SET Promotion	+6.292	1

== Standings after the event ==
Super1600 standings

Pos	Driver	Pts	Gap
1	(Portugal) Mário Barbosa	25	
2	(Denmark) Ulrik Linnemann	23	+2
2	(Estonia) Janno Ligur	23	+2
4	(Hungary) Krisztián Szabó	22	+3
5	(Norway) Magnus Bergsjobrenden	18	+7

Previous race: 2015 Euro RX of Italy	FIA European Rallycross Championship; 2016 season	Next race: 2016 Euro RX of Belgium
