= Alexander Hvaal =

Norwegian rally driver

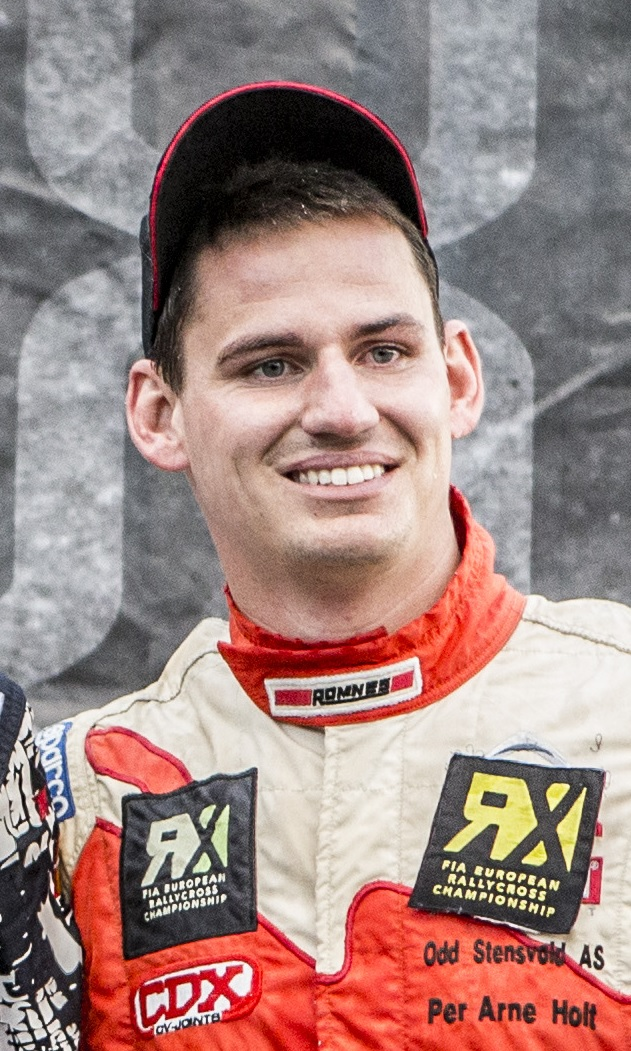
- Nationality: Norwegian
- Born: 25 May 1992 (age 34) Larvik, Vestfold

FIA ERX Supercar Championship career
- Debut season: 2012
- Current team: Hedströms Motorsport
- Car number: 53
- Former teams: Eklund Motorsport; JC Raceteknik; Citroën Hansen Motorsport
- Starts: 30
- Wins: 2
- Podiums: 7
- Best finish: 6th in 2013
- Finished last season: 9th

FIA World Rallycross Championship
- Years active: 2014–2016
- Former teams: Eklund Motorsport; JC Raceteknik; PSRX
- Starts: 9
- Wins: 0
- Podiums: 0
- Best finish: 28th in 2014

Alexander Hvaal (born 25 May 1992) is a professional rallycross driver from Larvik, Vestfold, Norway. He has raced in the European Rallycross Championship since 2012 and in the World Rallycross Championship since its inception in 2014.

== Results ==
=== Complete FIA European Rallycross Championship results ===
==== Division 1A ====
Year	Entrant	Car	1	2	3	4	5	6	7	8	9	10	ERX	Points
2010	Alexander Hvaal	Citroën Saxo	POR	FRA	GBR	HUN	SWE; 12	FIN	BEL	GER	POL	CZE; 4	18th	18

==== Supercar ====
Year	Entrant	Car	1	2	3	4	5	6	7	8	9	10	ERX	Points
2012	Citroën Hansen Motorsport	Citroën C4 T16 4x4	GBR; NC	FRA; 2	AUT; 2	HUN; 4	NOR; 6	SWE; 3	BEL; 19	NED; 8	FIN	GER; NC	7th	82
2013	Citroën Hansen Motorsport	Citroën DS3	GBR; 8	POR; 4	HUN; 6	FIN; 12	NOR; 4	SWE; 7	FRA; 10	AUT; 1	GER; 1		6th	116
2015	JC Raceteknik	Citroën DS3	BEL	GER	NOR	BAR; 2	ITA; 10						9th	33
2016	Eklund Motorsport	Volkswagen Beetle	BEL; 10	NOR; 13	SWE; 5	BAR; 8	LAT; 9						8th	50
2017	Hedströms Motorsport	Volkswagen Polo	BAR; 10	NOR; 3	SWE; 5	FRA; 8	LAT; 10						6th	61

=== Complete FIA World Rallycross Championship results ===
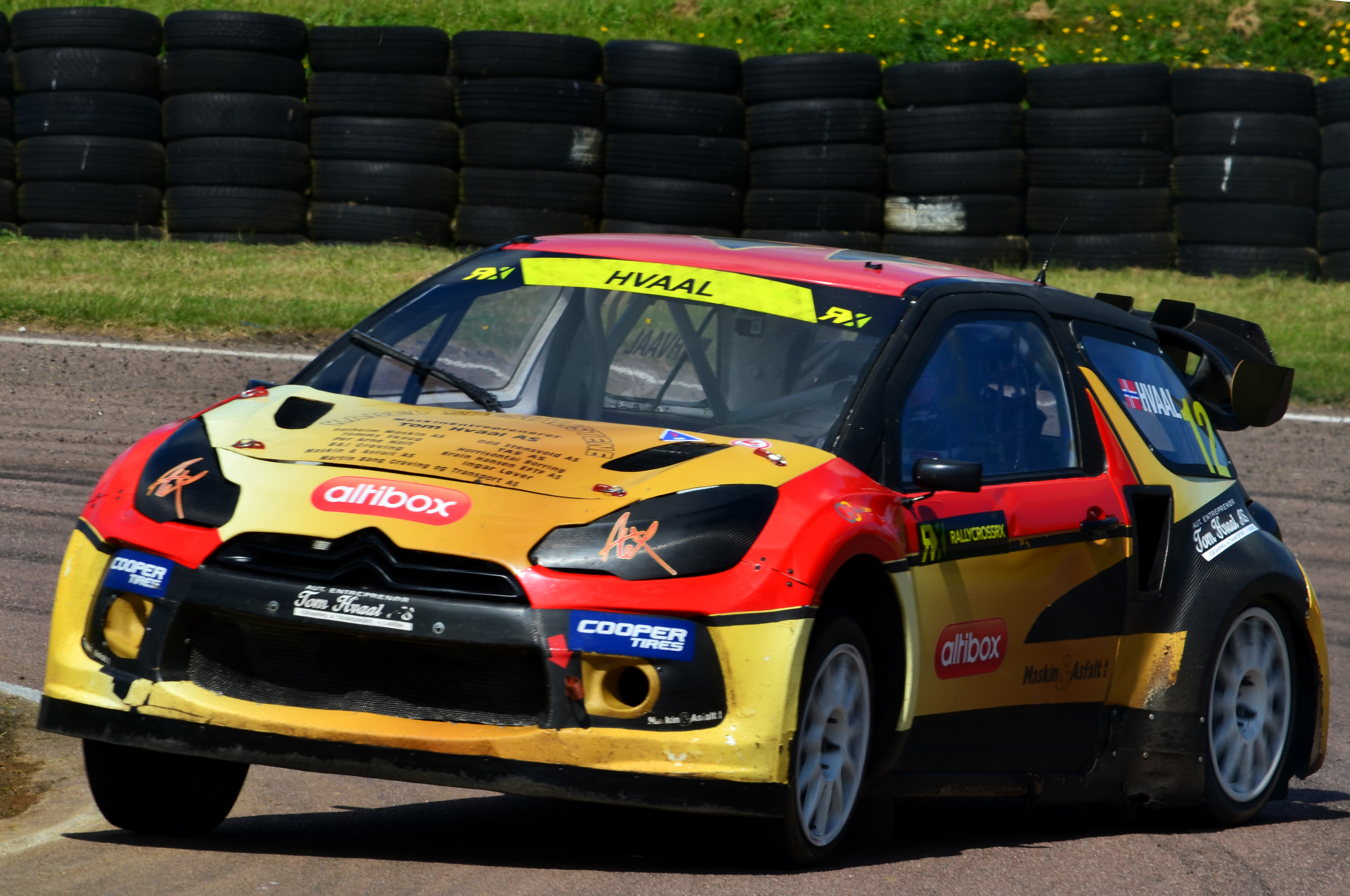
Hvaal at the 2014 World RX of Great Britain

==== Supercar ====
Year	Entrant	Car	1	2	3	4	5	6	7	8	9	10	11	12	13	WRX	Points
2014	PSRX	Citroën DS3	POR; 9	GBR; 17	NOR; 23	FIN; 14	SWE; 15	BEL	CAN	FRA	GER	ITA	TUR	ARG		27th	14
2015	JC Raceteknik	Citroën DS3	POR	HOC	BEL	GBR	GER	SWE; 22	CAN	NOR; 16	FRA	BAR	TUR; 15	ITA	ARG	29th	3
2016	Eklund Motorsport	Volkswagen Beetle	POR	HOC	BEL	GBR	NOR	SWE	CAN	FRA	BAR	LAT	GER; 22	ARG		39th	0
