= 2016 FIA European Rallycross Championship =

FIA European Rallycross Championship season

The 2016 FIA European Rallycross Championship was the 41st season of the FIA European Championships for Rallycross Drivers. The season consisted of nine rounds, commencing on 16 April with the Portuguese round at the Pista Automóvel de Montalegre, and culminating on 16 October in Germany at the Estering.

== Calendar ==
Round	Event	Venue	Dates	Category	Final Winner	Car	Team
1	Euro RX of Portugal	Pista Automóvel de Montalegre	16 – 17 April	Super1600	(Denmark) Ulrik Linnemann	Peugeot 208	(Denmark) Ulrik Linnemann
2	Euro RX of Belgium	Circuit Jules Tacheny Mettet	13 – 15 May	Supercar	(Sweden) Kevin Hansen	Peugeot 208 WRX	(Sweden) Peugeot-Hansen Academy
2	Euro RX of Belgium	Circuit Jules Tacheny Mettet	13 – 15 May	TouringCar	(Sweden) Magda Andersson	Ford Fiesta	(Sweden) Valvoline RX Team
3	(United Kingdom) Euro RX of Great Britain	Lydden Hill Race Circuit	28 – 29 May	Super1600	(Hungary) Krisztián Szabó	Škoda Fabia	TQS Hungary KFT
4	Euro RX of Norway	Lånkebanen	10 – 12 June	Supercar	(Sweden) Kevin Hansen	Peugeot 208 WRX	(Sweden) Peugeot-Hansen Academy
4	Euro RX of Norway	Lånkebanen	10 – 12 June	TouringCar	(Sweden) Philip Gehrman	Ford Fiesta	(Sweden) Bridgestone Motorsport
5	Euro RX of Sweden	Höljesbanan	1 – 3 July	Supercar	(Sweden) Kevin Hansen	Peugeot 208 WRX	(Sweden) Peugeot-Hansen Academy
5	Euro RX of Sweden	Höljesbanan	1 – 3 July	Super1600	(Denmark) Ulrik Linnemann	Peugeot 208	(Denmark) Ulrik Linnemann
5	Euro RX of Sweden	Höljesbanan	1 – 3 July	TouringCar	(Norway) Ben-Philip Gundersen	Ford Fiesta	(Norway) Ben-Philip Gundersen
6	Euro RX of France	Circuit de Lohéac	3 – 4 September	Super1600	(Hungary) Krisztián Szabó	Škoda Fabia	TQS Hungary KFT
7	(Spain) Euro RX of Barcelona	Circuit de Barcelona-Catalunya	16 – 18 September	Supercar	(Sweden) Kevin Hansen	Peugeot 208 WRX	(Sweden) Peugeot-Hansen Academy
7	(Spain) Euro RX of Barcelona	Circuit de Barcelona-Catalunya	16 – 18 September	Super1600	(Denmark) Ulrik Linnemann	Peugeot 208	(Denmark) Ulrik Linnemann
8	Euro RX of Latvia	Biķernieku Kompleksā Sporta Bāze	30 September – 2 October	Supercar	(Norway) Tommy Rustad	Peugeot 208 WRX	(United Kingdom) Albatec Racing
8	Euro RX of Latvia	Biķernieku Kompleksā Sporta Bāze	30 September – 2 October	TouringCar	(Norway) Fredrik Magnussen	Ford Fiesta	(Norway) Fredrik Magnussen
9	Euro RX of Germany	Estering	15 – 16 October	Super1600	(Hungary) Krisztián Szabó	Škoda Fabia	TQS Hungary KFT
9	Euro RX of Germany	Estering	15 – 16 October	TouringCar	(Norway) David Nordgård	Ford Fiesta	(Norway) David Nordgård

== Entries ==
=== Supercar ===
Constructor	Entrant	Car	No.	Driver	Rounds
Audi	(Hungary) Racing-Com	Audi A1	102	(Hungary) Tamás Kárai	All
Citroën	(Norway) Ole Kristian Temte	Citroën C4	30	(Norway) Ole Kristian Temte	1–3
Citroën	(France) DA Racing	Citroën DS3	87	(France) Jean-Baptiste Dubourg	1, 4
Ford	(Republic of Ireland) Oliver O'Donovan	Ford Fiesta	2	(Republic of Ireland) Oliver O'Donovan	2–5
Ford	(Sweden) Peter Hedström	Ford Fiesta	8	(Sweden) Peter Hedström	All
Ford	World RX Team Austria	Ford Fiesta	31	(Austria) Max Pucher	1–3
Ford	(Belgium) M.D.K.	Ford Fiesta	49	(Belgium) "M.D.K."	1–2, 4
Ford	(Sweden) Norbottens Bildemontering	Ford Fiesta	54	(Sweden) Mats Öhman	All
Ford	(Poland) Lotto Team	Ford Fiesta	69	(Poland) Martin Kaczmarski	All
Ford	(Poland) Lotto Team	Ford Fiesta	79	(Poland) Krzysztof Hołowczyc	1–2
Ford	(Germany) Andreas Steffen	Ford Fiesta	80	(Germany) Andreas Steffen	3–5
Ford	(Estonia) Reinsalu Sport	Ford Fiesta	95	(Estonia) Andri Õun	5
Ford	(Republic of Ireland) Derek Tohill	Ford Fiesta	111	(Republic of Ireland) Derek Tohill	All
Ford	(United Kingdom) Mark Flaherty	Ford Focus	97	(United Kingdom) Mark Flaherty	1–3
Ford	(Hungary) Speedy Motorsport	Ford Focus	124	(Hungary) "Csucsu"	1–4
BMW MINI	(Finland) #MiniSuomi	BMW MINI Countryman	12	(Finland) Riku Tahko	All
Peugeot	(Sweden) HTD Salsten Racing	Peugeot 208	11	(Sweden) Fredrik Salsten	All
Peugeot	(France) Fabien Pailler	Peugeot 208	20	(France) Fabien Pailler	1
Peugeot	(United Kingdom) Albatec Racing	Peugeot 208	24	(Norway) Tommy Rustad	All
Peugeot	(United Kingdom) Albatec Racing	Peugeot 208	26	(United Kingdom) Andy Scott	2–5
Peugeot	(United Kingdom) Albatec Racing	Peugeot 208	74	(France) Jérôme Grosset-Janin	All
Peugeot	(Sweden) Peugeot-Hansen Academy	Peugeot 208	71	(Sweden) Kevin Hansen	All
Peugeot	(Denmark) Ulrik Linnemann	Peugeot 208	72	(Denmark) Ulrik Linnemann	1
Peugeot	(Hungary) Speed box Közhasznú Egyesület	Peugeot 208	147	(Hungary) Tamás Pál Kiss	All
Renault	(Sweden) Helmia Motorsport	Renault Clio	48	(Sweden) Lukas Walfridson	3
Volkswagen	(Sweden) Eklund Motorsport	Volkswagen Beetle	53	(Norway) Alexander Hvaal	All
Volkswagen	(Sweden) Eklund Motorsport	Volkswagen Beetle	60	(Finland) Joni-Pekka Rajala	All
Volkswagen	(Belgium) Oud-Turnhout Rally Team VZW	Volkswagen Polo	28	(Belgium) Jochen Coox	1, 3
Volkswagen	(Norway) Tord Linnerud	Volkswagen Polo	99	(Norway) Tord Linnerud	All
Volvo	(Norway) Tom Daniel Tånevik	Volvo C30	16	(Norway) Tom Daniel Tånevik	All

=== Super1600 ===
Constructor	Entrant	Car	No.	Driver	Rounds
Audi	(France) Yvonnick Jagu	Audi A1	31	(France) Yvonnick Jagu	4
Audi	(Germany) Andreas Schrader	Audi A1	63	(Germany) Andreas Schrader	3–4, 6
Citroën	(Norway) Glenn Haug	Citroën C2	9	(Norway) Glenn Haug	1–5
Citroën	(United Kingdom) Michael Boak	Citroën C2	18	(United Kingdom) Michael Boak	1–2
Citroën	(Portugal) Helder Ribeiro	Citroën C2	22	(Portugal) Helder Ribeiro	1
Citroën	(United Kingdom) Craig Lomax	Citroën C2	24	(United Kingdom) Craig Lomax	1–2
Citroën	(United Kingdom) Philip Chicken	Citroën C2	62	(United Kingdom) Philip Chicken	1–3
Citroën	(France) Maximilien Eveno	Citroën C2	75	(France) Maximilien Eveno	4
Citroën	(Norway) Ada-Marie Hvaal	Citroën C2	97	(Norway) Ada-Marie Hvaal	1
Citroën	(Norway) Espen Isaksćtre	Citroën Saxo	8	(Norway) Espen Isaksćtre	1, 3
Citroën	(Portugal) Mário Barbosa	Citroën Saxo	76	(Portugal) Mário Barbosa	1–2
Citroën	(Portugal) Ricardo Soares	Citroën Saxo	79	(Portugal) Ricardo Soares	1
Ford	LS Racing Czech Republic Team	Ford Fiesta	5	(Czech Republic) Ondřej Smetana	All
Ford	(Portugal) Mario Teixeira	Ford Fiesta	77	(Portugal) Mario Teixeira	1
Ford	(Sweden) NMS Sporting	Ford Fiesta	90	(Sweden) Anitra Nilsen	1
Ford	(Estonia) Reinsalu Sport	Ford Ka	47	(Estonia) Andre Kurg	1–3
Lada	(Russia) TT Motorsport	Lada Kalina	98	(Russia) Egor Sanin	1–4, 6
Peugeot	(Portugal) Joaquim Machado	Peugeot 206	78	(Portugal) Joaquim Machado	1
Peugeot	(Denmark) Ulrik Linnemann	Peugeot 208	2	(Denmark) Ulrik Linnemann	All
Peugeot	(Denmark) Ulrik Linnemann	Peugeot 208	12	(Denmark) Daniel Nielsen	All
Peugeot	(France) Emmanuel Martin	Peugeot 208	39	(France) Emmanuel Martin	4
Peugeot	(Czech Republic) Veverka Czech National Team	Peugeot 208	66	(Czech Republic) Václav Veverka	2–5
Peugeot	(France) Rudolf Schafer	Peugeot 208	73	(France) Rudolf Schafer	1–2, 4–5
Renault	(France) Anthony Jan	Renault Clio	35	(France) Anthony Jan	4
Renault	(Italy) Mirko Zanni	Renault Clio	81	(Italy) Mirko Zanni	1–2
Renault	(France) Dubourg Auto Racing	Renault Clio	92	(France) Andréa Dubourg	4
Renault	(Finland) SET Promotion	Renault Twingo	17	(Latvia) Artis Baumanis	All
Renault	(Finland) SET Promotion	Renault Twingo	21	(Norway) Magnus Bergsjobrenden	1
Renault	(Finland) SET Promotion	Renault Twingo	89	(Russia) Timur Shigabutdinov	All
Renault	(Finland) SET Promotion	Renault Twingo	99	(Finland) Jesse Kallio	5
Renault	(Estonia) RS Racing	Renault Twingo	20	(Estonia) Siim Saluri	1–3, 6
Renault	(France) Enzo Libner	Renault Twingo	36	(France) Enzo Libner	4
Renault	(Russia) TT Motorsport	Renault Twingo	87	(Russia) Dimitrii Malakhov	1–3
Škoda	(Czech Republic) Diana Czech National Team	Škoda Fabia	3	(Czech Republic) Pavel Vimmer	All
Škoda	(Lithuania) Všl Dakaras LT	Škoda Fabia	6	(Lithuania) Kasparas Navickas	All
Škoda	(Estonia) Janno Ligur	Škoda Fabia	10	(Estonia) Janno Ligur	All
Škoda	(Hungary) M-F Motorsport KFT	Škoda Fabia	15	(Hungary) Gergely Marton	1–2, 5–6
Škoda	(Czech Republic) Josef Šusta	Škoda Fabia	16	(Czech Republic) Josef Šusta	2–6
Škoda	(Hungary) GFS Motorsport Egyesület	Škoda Fabia	19	(Hungary) Lajos "Luigi" Gyula	1, 3–6
Škoda	TQS Hungary KFT	Škoda Fabia	23	(Hungary) Krisztián Szabó	All
Škoda	(Italy) Luciano Visintin	Škoda Fabia	69	(Italy) Luciano Visintin	5
Škoda	(Austria) RCC-Süd	Škoda Fabia	83	(Austria) Christian Petrakovits	2, 4
Suzuki	(France) Fabien Grosset-Janin	Suzuki Swift	25	(France) Fabien Grosset-Janin	4
Suzuki	(Hungary) Speedy Motorsport	Suzuki Swift	101	(Hungary) Zsolt Szíjj	All
Volkswagen	(Lithuania) Vilkyciai ASK	Volkswagen Polo	7	(Lithuania) Ernestas Staponkus	All
Volkswagen	(France) Dominique Gerbaud	Volkswagen Polo	32	(France) Dominique Gerbaud	4

=== TouringCar ===
Constructor	Entrant	Car	No.	Driver	Rounds
BMW	(Norway) Sondre Hansen	BMW 120	20	(Norway) Sondre Hansen	3
BMW	(Germany) Ralf Evers	BMW E87	28	(Germany) Ralf Evers	5
Citroën	(Norway) Jan Emil Wilsberg	Citroën DS3	9	(Norway) Jan Emil Wilsberg	3
Ford	(Norway) David Nordgård	Ford Fiesta	2	(Norway) David Nordgård	All
Ford	(Norway) Anders Bråten	Ford Fiesta	3	(Norway) Anders Bråten	All
Ford	(Sweden) Valvoline RX Team	Ford Fiesta	7	(Sweden) Magda Andersson	All
Ford	(Norway) Fredrik Magnussen	Ford Fiesta	12	(Norway) Fredrik Magnussen	All
Ford	(Norway) Camilla Antonsen	Ford Fiesta	15	(Norway) Camilla Antonsen	All
Ford	(Norway) Ben-Philip Gundersen	Ford Fiesta	16	(Norway) Ben-Philip Gundersen	All
Ford	(Norway) Aleksander Bjornstad	Ford Fiesta	19	(Norway) Aleksander Bjornstad	1–3, 5
Ford	(Norway) Torleif Haugenes Lona	Ford Fiesta	73	(Norway) Torleif Haugenes Lona	All
Ford	(Netherlands) Mandy Kasse	Ford Fiesta	88	(Netherlands) Mandy Kasse	1
Ford	(Sweden) Bridgestone Motorsport	Ford Fiesta	95	(Sweden) Philip Gehrman	All
Ford	(Norway) Kai-Arne Homme	Ford Focus	78	(Norway) Kai-Arne Homme	2–3
Mazda	(Norway) Per-Magne Røyrås	Mazda RX-8	5	(Norway) Per-Magne Røyrås	All
Mazda	(Norway) Steinar Stokke	Mazda RX-8	11	(Norway) Steinar Stokke	All
Mazda	(Norway) JC Race Teknik	Mazda RX-8	17	(Norway) Marius Vardeberg	3
Mazda	(Norway) Christian Sandmo	Mazda RX-8	55	(Norway) Christian Sandmo	1–3
Opel	(Norway) Petter Brauten	Opel Corsa	86	(Norway) Petter Brauten	2–4
Peugeot	(Sweden) Fredrik Larsson	Peugeot 207	18	(Sweden) Fredrik Larsson	3
Škoda	(Sweden) Bridgestone Motorsport	Škoda Fabia	4	(Norway) Kjetil Larsen	All
Toyota	(Sweden) Sören Hedlund	Toyota Auris	83	(Sweden) Sören Hedlund	1–4
Volkswagen	(Netherlands) Jo van de Ven	Volkswagen Polo	56	(Netherlands) Jo van de Ven	1, 5
Volvo	(Sweden) Daniel Lundh	Volvo C30	6	(Sweden) Daniel Lundh	All
Volvo	(Belgium) Oud-Turnhout Rally Team VZW	Volvo C30	14	(Belgium) Danny de Beuckelaer	1

== Championship Standings ==
=== Supercar ===
Pos.	Driver	BEL (Belgium)	NOR (Norway)	SWE (Sweden)	BAR (Spain)	LAT (Latvia)	Points
1	(Sweden) Kevin Hansen	1	1	1	1	2	143
2	(France) Jérôme Grosset-Janin	2	5	8	4	4	105
3	(Norway) Tord Linnerud	3	2	4	3	6	99
4	(Norway) Tommy Rustad	5	7	3	2	1	94
5	(Hungary) Tamás Pál Kiss	8	3	6^{1}	7	3	78
6	(Sweden) Fredrik Salsten	13	6	2	6	8	77
7	(Sweden) Peter Hedström	14	4	9	5	5	75
8	(Norway) Alexander Hvaal	10	13	5	8	9	50
9	(Hungary) Tamás Kárai	7	5	11	9	11	43
10	(Finland) Joni-Pekka Rajala	6	9	15	20	18	33
11	(Poland) Martin Kaczmarski	9	8	20	10^{3}	7	32
12	(Sweden) Mats Öhman	21	11	7	14	16	26
13	(Hungary) "Csucsu"	4	18	13	13		24
14	(Republic of Ireland) Derek Tohill	12	17	10	16	10	24
15	(Republic of Ireland) Oliver O'Donovan		12	17	11	12	21
16	(United Kingdom) Andy Scott			12	12	13	20
17	(Poland) Krzysztof Hołowczyc	11	10				16
18	(Austria) Max Pucher	16	14	14			7
19	(Norway) Tom-Daniel Tånevik	15	15	21	18	14	7
20	(Belgium) "M.D.K"	17	23		15		2
21	(Germany) Andreas Steffen					15	2
22	(Belgium) Jochen Coox			16			1
23	(Norway) Ole Kristian Temte	25	19	19			0
24	(France) Fabien Pailler	19					0
25	(United Kingdom) Mark Flaherty	22	21	DNS			0
26	(Sweden) Lukas Walfridson			22			0
27	(Denmark) Ulrik Linnemann	23					0
28	(France) Jean-Baptiste Dubourg	18			DNS^{2}		-10
29	(Finland) Riku Tahko	20	22	23	17	19^{4}	-30

^{1} #147 -10 Championship points penalty Stewards decision No.4.
^{2} #87 -10 Championship points penalty Stewards decision No.2.
^{3} #69 -10 Championship points penalty Stewards decision No.4.
^{4} #12 -30 Championship points penalty Stewards decision.

=== Super1600 ===
Pos.	Driver	PRT (Portugal)	GBR (United Kingdom)	SWE (Sweden)	FRA (France)	BAR (Spain)	GER (Germany)	Points
1	(Hungary) Krisztián Szabó	5	1	7	1	6	1	137
2	(Denmark) Ulrik Linnemann	1	7	1	2	1	2	135
3	(Lithuania) Kasparas Navickas	17	13	8	6	3	3	87
3=	(Russia) Timur Shigabutdinov	3	6	5	17	5	9	87
5	(Latvia) Artis Baumanis	18	2	4	9	12	7	80
6	(Czech Republic) Ondřej Smetana	8	23	3	7	11	6	68
7	(Czech Republic) Josef Šusta		3	14	3	15	4	64
7=	(Estonia) Janno Ligur	4	11	21	8	7	15	64
9	(Hungary) "Luigi"	21		12	12	2	8	60
10	(Czech Republic) Pavel Vimmer	14	9	10	10	10	10	55
11	(Lithuania) Ernestas Staponkus	9	5	9	14	9	13	52
12	(Norway) Espen Isaksætre	7		2				35
13	(Portugal) Mário Barbosa	2	12					34
14	(Estonia) Siim Saluri	15	15	6			11	29
15	(Hungary) Gergely Marton	25	14			8	5	24
16	(France) Enzo Libner				4			21
16=	(Russia) Egor Sanin	13	16	11	15		DSQ	21
18	(Finland) Jesse Kallio					4		20
19	(Norway) Magnus Bergsjobrenden	6						18
20	(Austria) Christian Petrakovitis		4		22			16
20=	(Czech Republic) Václav Veverka		8	16	20	14		16
20=	(France) Rudolf Schafer	11	10		16	16		16
23	(Russia) Dimitrii Malakhov	10	24	15				12
24	(France) Maximilien Eveno				5			11
25	(Norway) Glenn Haug	12	20	22	19	19		10
26	(France) Fabien Grosset-Janin				11			7
27	(Denmark) Daniel Nielsen	26	17	20	21	17	12	5
27=	(Hungary) Zsolt Szíjj	29		17	23	13	16	5
29	(Estonia) Andre Kurg	20	19	13				4
29=	(France) Andreá Dubourg				13			4
31	(Germany) Andreas Schrader			18	26		14	3
32	(Portugal) Ricardo Soares	16						1
33	(United Kingdom) Phil Chicken	30	18	19				0
33=	(United Kingdom) Michael Boak	24	DNS					0
33=	(Italy) Mirko Zanni	28	DSQ					0
33=	(United Kingdom) Craig Lomax	22	32					0
33=	(Norway) Ada Marie Hvaal	18						0
33=	(Portugal) Mário Teixeira	21						0
33=	(Portugal) Joaquim Machado	23						0
33=	(Portugal) Hélder Ribeiro	27						0
33=	(Sweden) Anitra Nilsen	31						0
33=	(France) Yvonnick Jagu				18			0
33=	(France) Emmanuel Martin				24			0
33=	(France) Dominique Gerbaud				25			0
33=	(France) Anthony Jan				DNS			0
33=	(Italy) Luciano Visintin					18		0

=== TouringCar ===
Pos.	Driver	BEL (Belgium)	NOR (Norway)	SWE (Sweden)	LAT (Latvia)	GER (Germany)	Points
1	(Norway) Ben-Philip Gundersen	3	4	1	9	5	107
2	(Sweden) Magda Andersson	1	11	2	2	2	106
3	(Norway) Fredrik Magnussen	2	3	7	1	11	93
4	(Norway) Per Magne Røyrås	5	2	8	5	4	90
5	(Norway) Anders Bråten	8	6	6	12	3	79
6	(Sweden) Philip Gehrman	18	1	12	3	14	64
7	(Norway) David Nordgård	6	13	17	8	1	63
8	(Norway) Torleif Lona	13	7	4	4	9	62
9	(Sweden) Daniel Lundh	4	5	11	11	7	61
10	(Norway) Kjetil Larsen	10	15	5	6	15	56
11	(Norway) Steinar Stokke	16	12	9	13	6	44
12	(Norway) Petter Brauten		10	3	7		32
13	(Norway) Camilla Antonsen	7	16	18	10	8	30
13=	(Norway) Aleksander Bjørnstad	11	9	14		10	30
15	(Norway) Christian Sandmo	15	8	20			20
16	(Belgium) Danny de Beuckelaer	12					16
17	(Sweden) Sören Hedlund	14	14	15	14		11
18	(Sweden) Fredrik Larsson			10			10
19	(Netherlands) Mandy Kasse	9					7
20	(Netherlands) Jo van de Ven	17				12	6
21	(Norway) Sondre Hansen			13			4
21=	(Germany) Ralf Evers					13	4
23	(Norway) Jan Emil Wilsberg			16			1
24	(Norway) Kai Arne Homme		17	19			0
24=	(Norway) Marius Vardeberg			21			0
