= Tord Linnerud =

Norwegian racing and rallycross driver (born 1974)

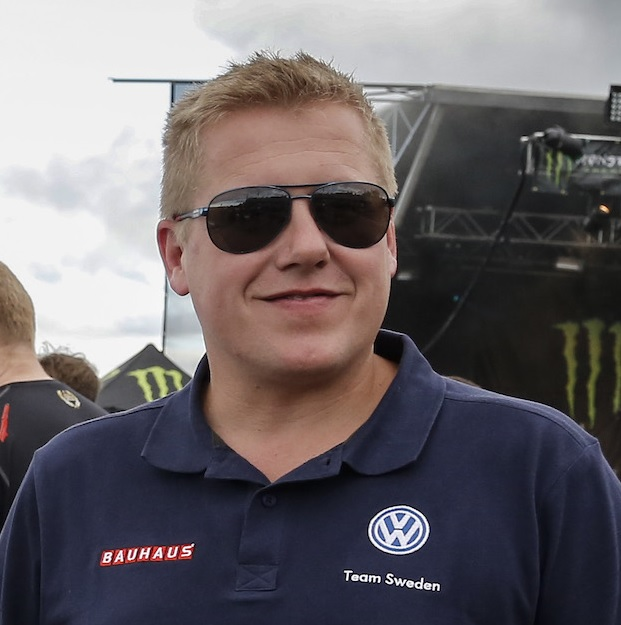
- Linnerud at the 2015 World RX of Canada
- Nationality: Norwegian
- Born: 10 August 1974 (age 52) Gjøvik, Oppland

FIA European Rallycross Championship career
- Debut season: 2013
- Car number: 99
- Starts: 13
- Wins: 0
- Podiums: 3
- Best finish: 3rd in 2016 (Supercar)

FIA World Rallycross Championship
- Years active: 2014–2015
- Car number: 99
- Former teams: Volkswagen Team Sweden; Helmia Motorsport
- Starts: 17
- Wins: 0
- Podiums: 0
- Best finish: 14th in 2015

Swedish Touring Car Championship
- Years active: 1998–2000
- Car number: 37
- Former teams: Tord Linnerud
- Starts: 21
- Wins: 0

Tord Linnerud (born 10 August 1974) is a racing and rallycross driver from Gjøvik, Norway. He has a large amount of experience in motorsport, competing in the Swedish Touring Car Championship at the turn of the millennium and more recently the World and European rallycross championships.

== Racing record ==
=== Complete Swedish Touring Car Championship results ===
| Year | Entrant | Car | 1 | 2 | 3 | 4 | 5 | 6 | 7 | 8 | 9 | 10 | 11 | 12 | 13 | 14 | 15 | 16 | STCC | Points |
|---|---|---|---|---|---|---|---|---|---|---|---|---|---|---|---|---|---|---|---|---|
| 1998 | Tord Linnerud | Opel Vectra | MAN1; DNS | MAN2; DNS | KAR1 | KAR2 | AND1 | AND2 | FAL1 | FAL2 | KNU1 | KNU2 | MAN1; 11 | MAN2; Ret | | | | | 26th | 5 |
| 1999 | Tord Linnerud | Opel Vectra | MAN1; 13 | MAN2; 11 | KNU1; 17 | KNU2; 18 | KAR1; 15 | KAR2; 7 | AND1; 11 | AND2; 6 | FAL1; Ret | FAL2; 12 | AND1; DNS | AND2; 13 | ARC1; 11 | ARC2; 11 | MAN1; 8 | MAN2; 6 | 14th | 28 |
| 2000 | Tord Linnerud | Opel Vectra | KAR1 | KAR2 | KNU1 | KNU2 | MAN1 | MAN2 | FAL1 | FAL2 | AND1; 13 | AND2; Ret | ARC1; 9 | ARC2; 6 | KAR1 | KAR2 | MAN1 | MAN2 | 17th | 7 |

=== Complete FIA European Rallycross Championship results ===
==== Supercar ====
| Year | Entrant | Car | 1 | 2 | 3 | 4 | 5 | 6 | 7 | 8 | 9 | ERX | Points |
|---|---|---|---|---|---|---|---|---|---|---|---|---|---|
| 2013 | Tord Linnerud | Renault Clio | GBR | POR | HUN | FIN | NOR; 10 | SWE | FRA | AUT; 11 | GER; 12 | 26h | 12 |
| 2014 | Helmia Motorsport | Renault Clio | GBR; 15 | NOR; 9 | BEL; 11 | GER; 17 | ITA; 13 | | | | | 12th | 20 |
| 2016 | Tord Linnerud | Volkswagen Polo | BEL; 3 | NOR; 2 | SWE; 4 | BAR; 3 | LAT; 6 | | | | | 3rd | 99 |

=== Complete FIA World Rallycross Championship results ===
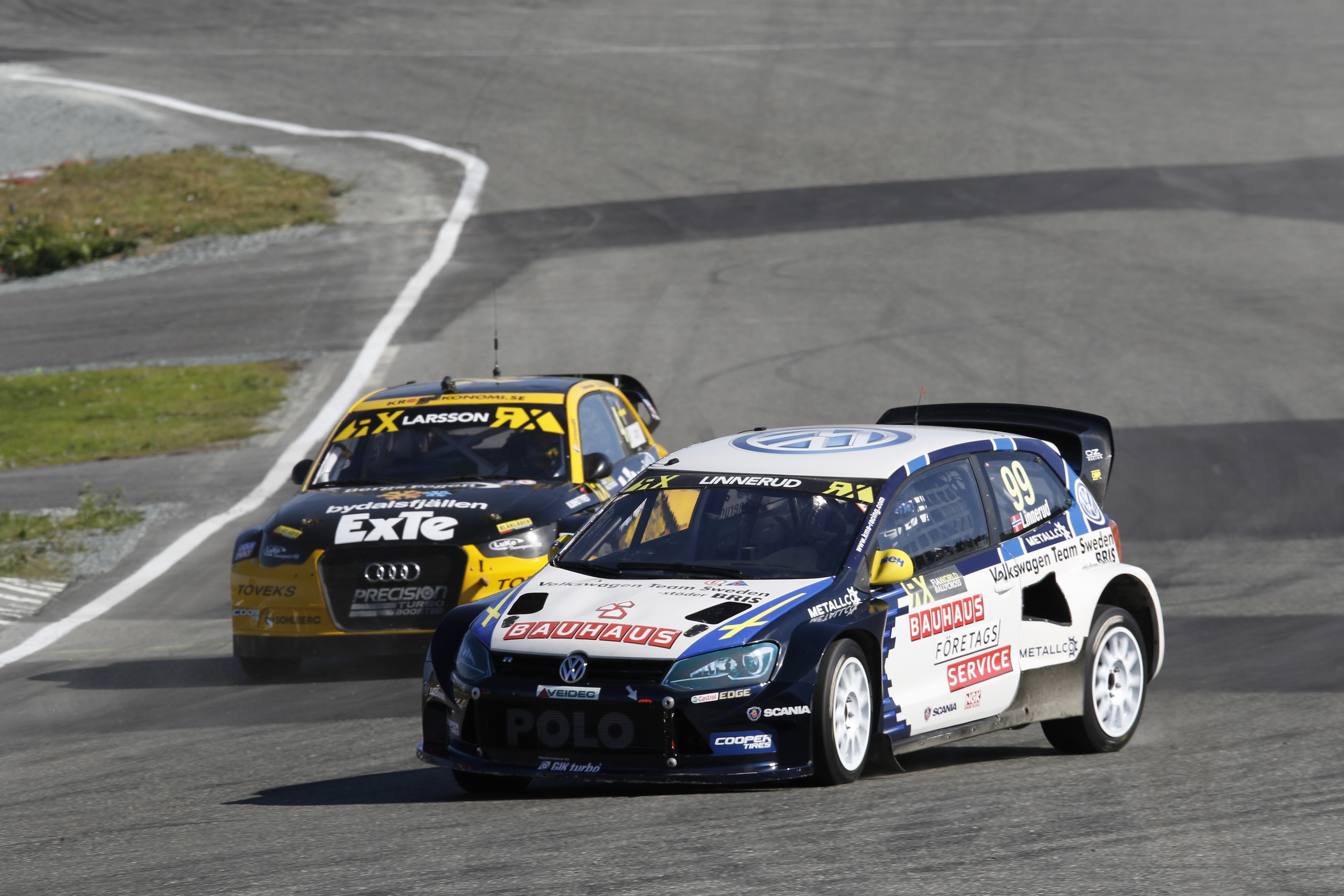
Linnerud leads Robin Larsson at the 2015 World RX of Norway

==== Supercar ====
| Year | Entrant | Car | 1 | 2 | 3 | 4 | 5 | 6 | 7 | 8 | 9 | 10 | 11 | 12 | 13 | WRX | Points |
|---|---|---|---|---|---|---|---|---|---|---|---|---|---|---|---|---|---|
| 2014 | Helmia Motorsport | Renault Clio | POR | GBR; 26 | NOR; 17 | FIN | SWE; 12 | BEL; 19 | CAN | FRA | GER | ITA; 21 | TUR | ARG | | 85th | -9 |
| 2015 | Volkswagen Team Sweden | Volkswagen Polo | POR; 16 | HOC; 11 | BEL; 12 | GBR; 9 | GER; 5 | SWE; 21 | CAN; 20 | NOR; 15 | FRA; 18 | BAR; 12 | TUR; 11 | ITA; 11 | ARG | 14th | 49 |
