= Derek Tohill =

Irish rallycross driver (born 1975)

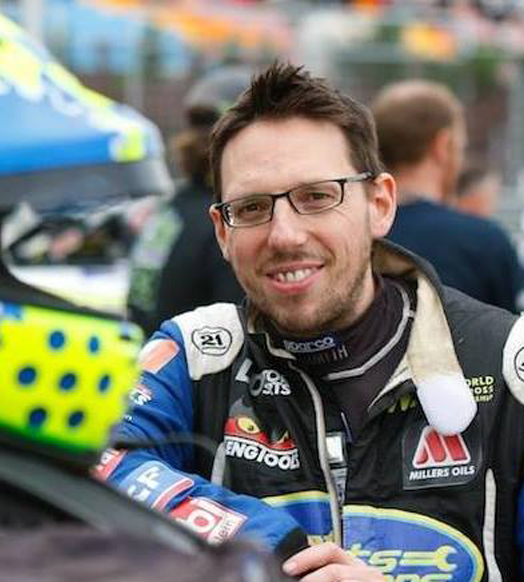
- Derek Tohill
- Nationality: Ireland
- Born: September 30, 1975 (age 51) Dublin, Ireland

FIA ERX Supercar Championship career
- Debut season: 2016
- Car number: 111
- Starts: 15
- Wins: 0
- Podiums: 0
- Best finish: 7th in 2017
- Finished last season: 14th

FIA World Rallycross Championship
- Years active: 2014
- Former teams: LD Motorsports
- Starts: 12
- Wins: 0
- Podiums: 0
- Best finish: 14th in 2014

FIA ERX TouringCar Championship
- Years active: 2011–2013
- Starts: 29
- Championships: 1 (2013)
- Wins: 6
- Podiums: 17

FIA ERX Division 2 Championship
- Years active: 2008, 2010
- Starts: 21
- Championships: 1 (2010)
- Wins: 5
- Podiums: 10

Derek Tohill (born 30 September 1975) is an Irish rallycross driver. He currently competes in the 2016 FIA European Rallycross Championship Supercar class in a Ford Fiesta.

Tohill won the European Rallycross Division 2 Championship in 2010 and the Touringcar championship in 2013 driving Fiestas.

== Racing record ==
=== Complete FIA European Rallycross Championship results ===
==== Division 2 ====
| Year | Entrant | Car | 1 | 2 | 3 | 4 | 5 | 6 | 7 | 8 | 9 | 10 | 11 | ERX | Points |
|---|---|---|---|---|---|---|---|---|---|---|---|---|---|---|---|
| 2008 | Derek Tohill | Honda Civic Type R | POR; 4 | FRA (NC) | HUN; 4 | AUT; 5 | NOR; 6 | SWE; 7 | BEL; 4 | NED; 3 | CZE; 4 | POL; 1 | GER (5) | 4th | 117 |
| 2010 | Derek Tohill | Ford Fiesta | POR; 3 | FRA (5) | GBR; 1 | HUN; 5 | SWE; 3 | FIN (3) | BEL; 1 | GER; 1 | POL; 2 | CZE; 1 | | 1st | 139 |

==== Touringcar ====
| Year | Entrant | Car | 1 | 2 | 3 | 4 | 5 | 6 | 7 | 8 | 9 | 10 | ERX | Points |
|---|---|---|---|---|---|---|---|---|---|---|---|---|---|---|
| 2011 | Derek Tohill | Ford Fiesta | GBR; 6 | POR; 2 | FRA; 6 | NOR; 2 | SWE (11) | BEL (4) | NED; 2 | AUT; 3 | POL; 4 | CZE; 3 | 3rd | 116 |
| 2012 | Derek Tohill | Ford Fiesta | GBR; 3 | FRA; 1 | AUT (5) | HUN; 1 | NOR; 2 | SWE; 4 | BEL; 9 | NED; 3 | FIN; 4 | GER (13) | 2nd | 121 |
| 2013 | Derek Tohill | Ford Fiesta | GBR; 1 | POR; 5 | HUN; 3 | FIN; 2 | NOR; 2 | SWE; 1 | FRA; 1 | AUT; 1 | GER; 6 | | 1st | 212 |

==== Supercar ====
| Year | Entrant | Car | 1 | 2 | 3 | 4 | 5 | ERX | Points |
|---|---|---|---|---|---|---|---|---|---|
| 2016 | Derek Tohill | Ford Fiesta | BEL; 12 | NOR; 17 | SWE; 12 | BAR; 16 | LAT; 10 | 14th | 24 |
| 2017 | Derek Tohill | Ford Fiesta | BAR; 5 | NOR; 10 | SWE; 11 | FRA; 5 | LAT; 8 | 7th | 59 |
| 2018 | Derek Tohill | Ford Fiesta | BAR; 9 | BEL; 14 | SWE; 13 | FRA; 13 | LAT; 13 | 14th | 25 |

=== Complete FIA World Rallycross Championship results ===
==== Supercar ====
| Year | Entrant | Car | 1 | 2 | 3 | 4 | 5 | 6 | 7 | 8 | 9 | 10 | 11 | 12 | WRX | Points |
|---|---|---|---|---|---|---|---|---|---|---|---|---|---|---|---|---|
| 2014 | LD Motorsports | Citroën DS3 | POR; 10 | GBR; 24 | NOR; 25 | FIN; 8 | SWE; 29 | BEL; 24 | CAN; 14 | FRA; 20 | GER; 20 | ITA; 26 | TUR; 10 | ARG; 13 | 14th | 35 |

=== Irish Rallycross Championship results ===
==== Supercar ====
| Year | Entrant | Car | Points | Position |
|---|---|---|---|---|
| 2016 | Derek Tohill | Ford Fiesta | 74 | 1st |

| Year | Entrant | Car | Points | Position |
|---|---|---|---|---|
| 2017 | Derek Tohill | Ford Fiesta | 120 | 1st |

| Year | Entrant | Car | Points | Position |
|---|---|---|---|---|
| 2018 | Derek Tohill | Ford Fiesta | 80 | 1st |

| Year | Entrant | Car | Points | Position |
|---|---|---|---|---|
| 2019 | Derek Tohill | Ford Fiesta | 100 | 1st |

Sporting positions
| Preceded by Knut Ove Børseth | European Rallycross Division 2 Champion; 2010 | Succeeded by None |
| Preceded by Anton Marklund | European Rallycross TouringCar Champion; 2013 | Succeeded by Daniel Lundh |
