= Tamás Pál Kiss =

Hungarian racing driver

- Nationality: (Hungary) Hungarian
- Born: 19 May 1991 (age 35) Miskolc, Hungary

FIA ERX Supercar Championship career
- Debut season: 2015
- Current team: Speedbox Racing Team
- Car number: 147
- Former teams: Hansen Talent Development
- Starts: 11
- Wins: 0
- Podiums: 5
- Best finish: 5th in 2016

Auto GP
- Years active: 2013–2014
- Former teams: Virtuosi UK; Zele Racing; Team MLR71; Ibiza Racing Team
- Starts: 28
- Wins: 3
- Poles: 1
- Fastest laps: 2
- Best finish: 2nd in 2014

Previous series
- 2012 2011-2012 2010 2009–10 2008 2007-08: Formula Renault 3.5 Series; GP3 Series; Eurocup Formula Renault 2.0; Formula Renault UK; LO Formule Renault 2.0 Suisse; Hungarian Championship E-2000

Tamás Pál Kiss (born 19 May 1991 in Miskolc) is a Hungarian former auto racing driver.

== Career ==
=== Karting ===
Kiss made his karting début in 1998 when he was seven years old. During ten years, he scored three titles in Hungarian Championships.

=== Formula Renault ===
After competing in regional Hungarian Championship E-2000 in 2007 and 2008, Kiss moved into the LO Formule Renault 2.0 Suisse in 2008 and finished fourteenth with points-scoring finishes in six in the eight races with Speed Box ASE. In 2009, Kiss switched to the Hitech Junior Team, to contest a full season of Formula Renault UK. He had seventeen point-scoring finishes on his way to thirteenth place in the championship and third in the Graduate Cup.

Kiss remained in the series with the newly renamed Atech Grand Prix team. He had improve to the third place in the championship, with eight podiums and three wins in Thruxton, Rockingham and Oulton Park.

=== GP3 Series ===
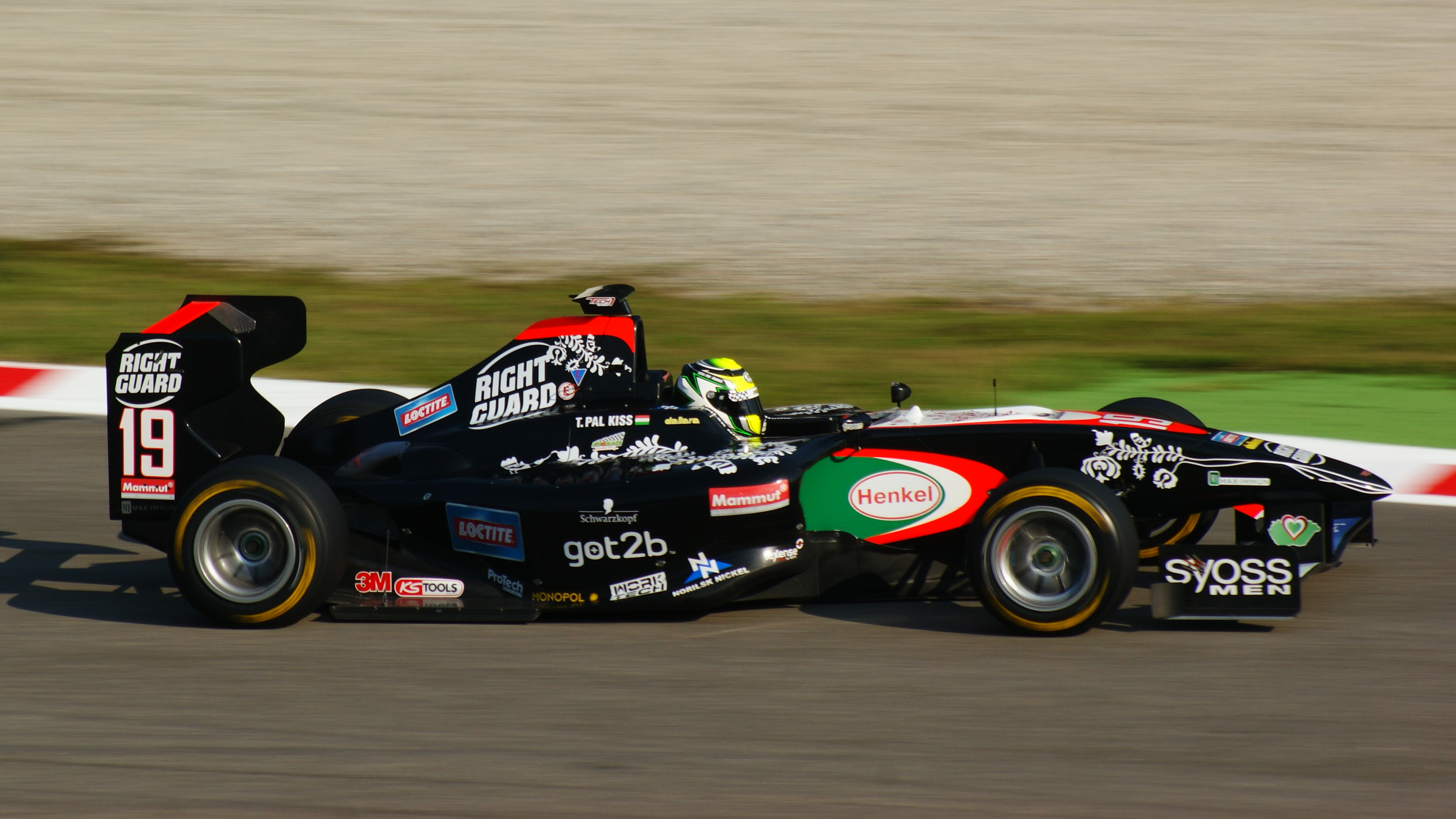
Tamás Pál Kiss racing in the 2011 GP3 Series at Autodromo Nazionale di Monza

Kiss graduated in GP3 Series with Tech 1 Racing in 2011.

== Personal life ==
Kiss is the manager of F4 British driver, Martin Molnár.

== Racing record ==
=== Career summary ===
Season	Series	Team	Races	Wins	Poles	F/Laps	Podiums	Points	Position
2007	Hungarian Championship E-2000		?	?	?	?	?	40	8th
2008	LO Formule Renault 2.0 Suisse	Speed Box ASE	8	0	0	0	0	45	14th
2008	Hungarian Championship E-2000		?	?	?	?	?	70	**3rd**
2009	Formula Renault UK	Hitech Junior Team	20	0	0	0	0	141	13th
2010	Formula Renault UK	Atech GP	20	3	0	1	8	417	**3rd**
2010	Eurcoup Formula Renault 2.0	Atech GP	2	0	0	1	0	N/A	NC†
2011	GP3 Series	Tech 1 Racing	16	1	0	0	1	11	16th
2012	GP3 Series	Atech CRS Grand Prix	16	0	0	0	1	38	12th
2012	Formula Renault 3.5 Series	BVM Target	4	0	0	0	0	0	28th
2013	Auto GP	Team MLR71	2	0	0	0	0	99	5th
2013	Auto GP	Zele Racing	6	0	0	1	1	99	5th
2013	Auto GP	Ibiza Racing Team	4	0	0	0	0	99	5th
2014	Auto GP	Zele Racing	10	1	0	1	5	207	**2nd**
2014	Auto GP	Virtuosi UK	6	2	1	0	4	207	**2nd**
2015	FIA European Rallycross Championship	Hansen Talent Development	1	0	0	0	0	20	18th
2016	FIA European Rallycross Championship	Speed Box KHE	5	0	0	0	2	78	5th
2017	FIA European Rallycross Championship	Speedbox Racing Team	5	0	0	0	3	90	**3rd**

^{†} As Pál Kiss was a guest driver, he was ineligible for points.

=== Complete Eurocup Formula Renault 2.0 results ===
(key) (Races in bold indicate pole position; races in italics indicate fastest lap)

Year	Entrant	1	2	3	4	5	6	7	8	9	10	11	12	13	14	15	16	DC	Points
2010	Atech GP	ALC; 1	ALC; 2	SPA; 1	SPA; 2	BRN; 1	BRN; 2	MAG; 1	MAG; 2	HUN; 1 Ret	HUN; 2; 9	HOC; 1	HOC; 2	SIL; 1	SIL; 2	CAT; 1	CAT; 2	NC†	0

† As Pál Kiss was a guest driver, he was ineligible for points.

=== Complete GP3 Series results ===
(key) (Races in bold indicate pole position) (Races in italics indicate fastest lap)

Year	Entrant	1	2	3	4	5	6	7	8	9	10	11	12	13	14	15	16	DC	Points
2011	Tech 1 Racing	IST; FEA; 16	IST; SPR; 18	CAT; FEA; 8	CAT; SPR; 1	VAL; FEA; 16	VAL; SPR; 13	SIL; FEA; Ret	SIL; SPR; 20	NÜR; FEA; 8	NÜR; SPR; 4	HUN; FEA; 10	HUN; SPR; 20	SPA; FEA; 17	SPA; SPR; 14	MNZ; FEA; Ret	MNZ; SPR; 12	16th	11
2012	Atech CRS Grand Prix	CAT; FEA; 12	CAT; SPR; Ret	MON; FEA; 2	MON; SPR; 9	VAL; FEA; 9	VAL; SPR; 10	SIL; FEA; 11	SIL; SPR; 14	HOC; FEA; 6	HOC; SPR; 4	HUN; FEA; 14	HUN; SPR; 10	SPA; FEA; 17	SPA; SPR; 10	MNZ; FEA; 9	MNZ; SPR; 15	12th	38

=== Complete Formula Renault 3.5 Series results ===
(key) (Races in bold indicate pole position) (Races in italics indicate fastest lap)

Year	Team	1	2	3	4	5	6	7	8	9	10	11	12	13	14	15	16	17	Pos	Points
2012	BVM Target	ALC; 1	ALC; 2	MON; 1	SPA; 1	SPA; 2	NÜR; 1	NÜR; 2	MSC; 1	MSC; 2	SIL; 1	SIL; 2	HUN; 1; 19	HUN; 2; 11	LEC; 1	LEC; 2	CAT; 1; 22	CAT; 2; 12	28th	0

=== Complete Auto GP results ===
(key) (Races in bold indicate pole position) (Races in italics indicate fastest lap)

Year	Entrant	1	2	3	4	5	6	7	8	9	10	11	12	13	14	15	16	Pos	Points
2013	Team MLR71	MNZ; 1	MNZ; 2	MAR; 1	MAR; 2	HUN; 1; 5	HUN; 2; 5											5th	99
2013	Zele Racing							SIL; 1; 3	SIL; 2; 7	MUG; 1; 5	MUG; 2; 4					BRN; 1; 5	BRN; 2; 5	5th	99
2013	Ibiza Racing Team											NÜR; 1; 6	NÜR; 2; 6	DON; 1; 7	DON; 2; 8			5th	99
2014	Zele Racing	MAR; 1 Ret	MAR; 2; 3	LEC; 1; 1	LEC; 2; 2	HUN; 1; 2	HUN; 2; 7	MNZ; 1; 2	MNZ; 2; 5	IMO; 1; 9	IMO; 2; 9							**2nd**	**207**
2014	Virtuosi UK											RBR; 1; 2	RBR; 2; 2	NÜR; 1; 4	NÜR; 2; 1	**EST**; **1**; 1	EST; 2; 4	**2nd**	**207**

=== Complete FIA European Rallycross Championship results ===
==== Supercar ====
Year	Entrant	Car	1	2	3	4	5	ERX	Points
2015	Hansen Talent Development	Peugeot 208 T16	BEL	GER	NOR	BAR	ITA; 6	18th	20
2016	Speed Box KHE	Peugeot 208	BEL; 8	NOR; 3	SWE; 6	BAR; 7	LAT; 3	5th	78
2017	Speedbox Racing Team	Peugeot 208	BAR; 2	NOR; 5	SWE; 32	FRA; 2	LAT; 3	3rd	90
