= Peter Hedström (racing driver) =

Rallycross driver from Sweden

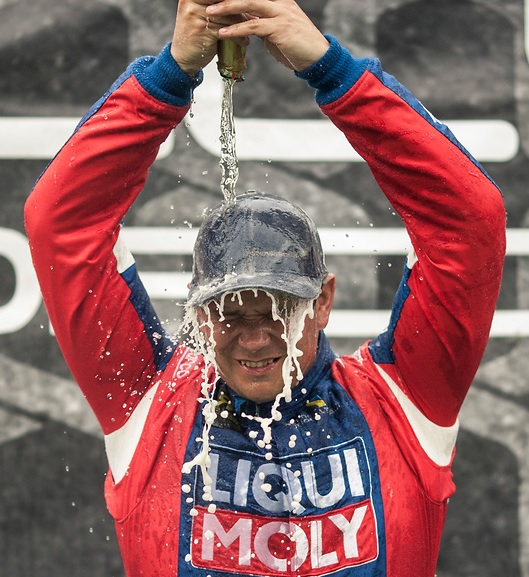
- Nationality: Swedish
- Born: 13 December 1983 (age 42) Torsby, Värmland

FIA ERX Supercar Championship career
- Debut season: 2012
- Current team: Hedströms Motorsport
- Car number: 8
- Starts: 44
- Wins: 0
- Podiums: 4
- Best finish: 4th in 2014
- Finished last season: 9th
- Current team: Hedströms Motorsport

FIA World Rallycross Championship
- Years active: 2014–2016, 2021
- Starts: 9
- Wins: 0
- Podiums: 0
- Best finish: 20th in 2014

Peter Hedström (born 13 December 1983) is a professional rallycross driver from Sweden. He races primarily as a privateer in the FIA ERX Supercar Championship and sporadically in the World Rallycross Championship.

The 2001 Swedish junior champion, Hedström began racing with Hedströms Motorsport in 2007. He debuted in the European Rallycross Championship in 2012, and his team moved up to the World Rallycross Championship the following year.

== Racing record ==
=== Complete FIA European Rallycross Championship results ===
(key)

==== Division 2 ====
Year	Entrant	Car	1	2	3	4	5	6	7	8	9	10	11	ERX	Points
2004	Peter Hedström	Renault Clio RSR	POR	FRA	CZE	AUT	NOR	SWE; 10	BEL	NED	POL	GER		33rd	7
2006	Peter Hedström	Honda Civic Type R	POR	FRA	CZE	AUT	SWE; 5	HUN	BEL	NED	NOR	POL	GER	30th	12
2007	Peter Hedström	Honda Civic Type R	POR	FRA	HUN	AUT	SWE; 4	NOR; 4	BEL	NED	POL	CZE		14th	26

==== Division 1 ====
Year	Entrant	Car	1	2	3	4	5	6	7	8	9	10	11	ERX	Points
2008	Peter Hedström	Ford Fiesta ST	POR	FRA	HUN	AUT	NOR; 15	SWE; NC	BEL	NED; NC	CZE	POL	GER	34th	2

==== Supercar ====
Year	Entrant	Car	1	2	3	4	5	6	7	8	9	10	ERX	Points
2012	Hedströms Motorsport	Škoda Fabia	GBR; 14	FRA (NC)	AUT; 6	HUN; 12	NOR; 13	SWE; 2	BEL (18)	NED; 7	FIN; 3	GER; 7	8th	75
2013	Hedströms Motorsport	Škoda Fabia	GBR; 17	POR; 12	HUN; 5	FIN; 17	NOR; 6	SWE; 18	FRA; 21	AUT; 8	GER; 8		10th	63
2014	Hedströms Motorsport	Škoda Fabia	GBR; 20	NOR; 5	BEL; 3	GER; 5	ITA; 15						4th	40
2015	Hedströms Motorsport	Škoda Fabia	BEL; 16	GER; 11									12th	31
2015	Hedströms Motorsport	Ford Fiesta			NOR; 8	BAR; 12	ITA; 4						12th	31
2016	Hedströms Motorsport	Ford Fiesta	BEL; 14	NOR; 4	SWE; 9								7th	75
2016	Hedströms Motorsport	Volkswagen Polo				BAR; 5	LAT; 5						7th	75
2017	Hedströms Motorsport	Volkswagen Polo	BAR; 29	NOR; 4	SWE; 2	FRA; 17	LAT; 12						8th	50
2018	Hedströms Motorsport	Volkswagen Polo	BAR; 6	BEL; 4	SWE; 6	FRA; 27	LAT; 26						9th	46

=== Complete FIA World Rallycross Championship results ===
(key)

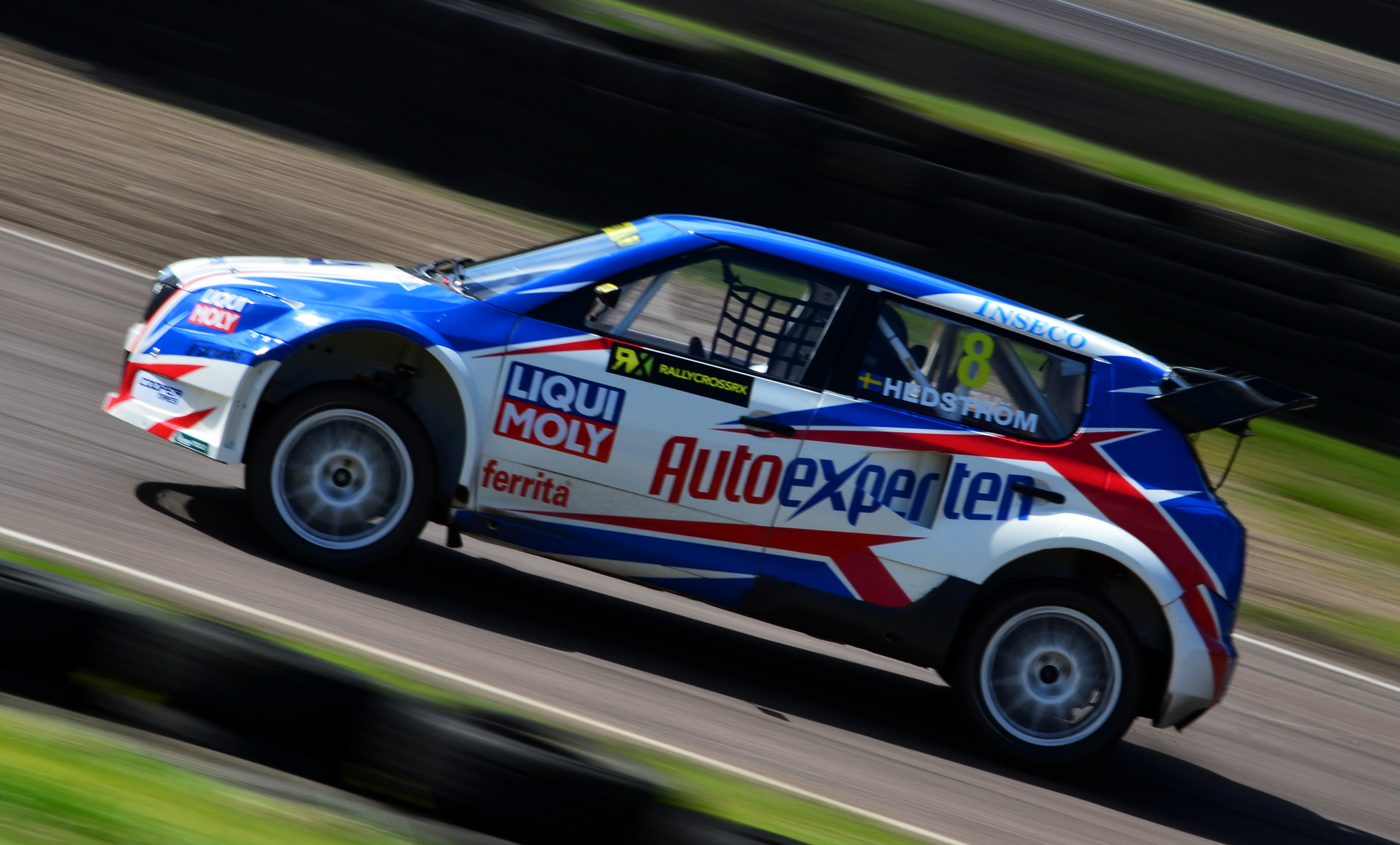
Hedström competing at the 2014 World RX of Great Britain

==== Supercar ====
Year	Entrant	Car	1	2	3	4	5	6	7	8	9	10	11	12	13	WRX	Points
2014	Hedströms Motorsport	Škoda Fabia	POR	GBR; 32	NOR; 12	FIN	SWE; 19	BEL; 9	CAN	FRA	GER; 9	ITA; 23	TUR	ARG		20th	22
2015	Hedströms Motorsport	Škoda Fabia	POR	HOC	BEL	GBR	GER	SWE; 35	CAN	NOR	FRA	BAR	TUR	ITA	ARG	40th	0
2016	Hedströms Motorsport	Volkswagen Polo	POR	HOC	BEL	GBR	NOR	SWE	CAN	FRA	BAR	LAT	GER; 16	ARG		25th	1
2021	Hedströms Motorsport	Hyundai i20	BAR	SWE; 9	FRA; 3	LAT	LAT	BEL	PRT	GER	GER					21st	11
