= 2016 World RX of Barcelona =

Rallycross event

- Round 9 of 12 in the 2016 FIA World Rallycross Championship
- Date: 17–18 September 2016
- Location: Barcelona, Catalonia
- Venue: Circuit de Barcelona-Catalunya

Results
Heat winners
- Heat 1: (Sweden) Timmy Hansen; Team Peugeot-Hansen
- Heat 2: (Sweden) Mattias Ekström; EKS RX
- Heat 3: Johan Kristoffersson; Volkswagen RX Sweden
- Heat 4: Johan Kristoffersson; Volkswagen RX Sweden
Semi-final winners
- Semi-final 1: (Sweden) Mattias Ekström; EKS RX
- Semi-final 2: (Russia) Timur Timerzyanov; World RX Team Austria
Final
- First: (Sweden) Mattias Ekström; EKS RX
- Second: (Sweden) Timmy Hansen; Team Peugeot-Hansen
- Third: (Russia) Timur Timerzyanov; World RX Team Austria

Rallycross layout of the Circuit de Catalunya

The 2016 World RX of Barcelona was the ninth round of the third season of the FIA World Rallycross Championship and the seventh round of the forty-first season of the FIA European Rallycross Championship. The event was held at the Circuit de Barcelona-Catalunya in Montmeló, Barcelona.

== Supercar ==
=== Heats ===
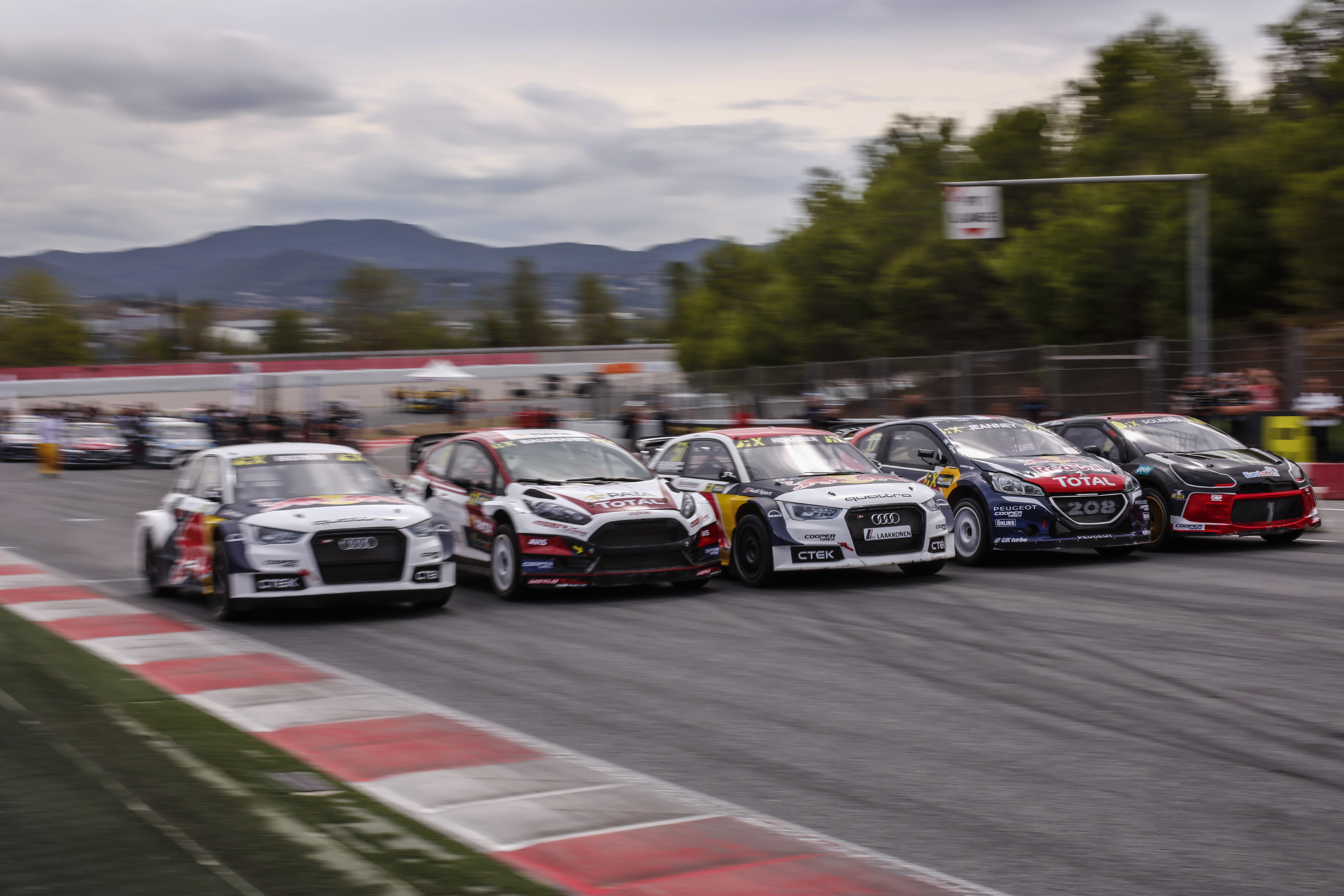
Qualifying Heat 1, Race 1 - the first race of the event was won by Solberg

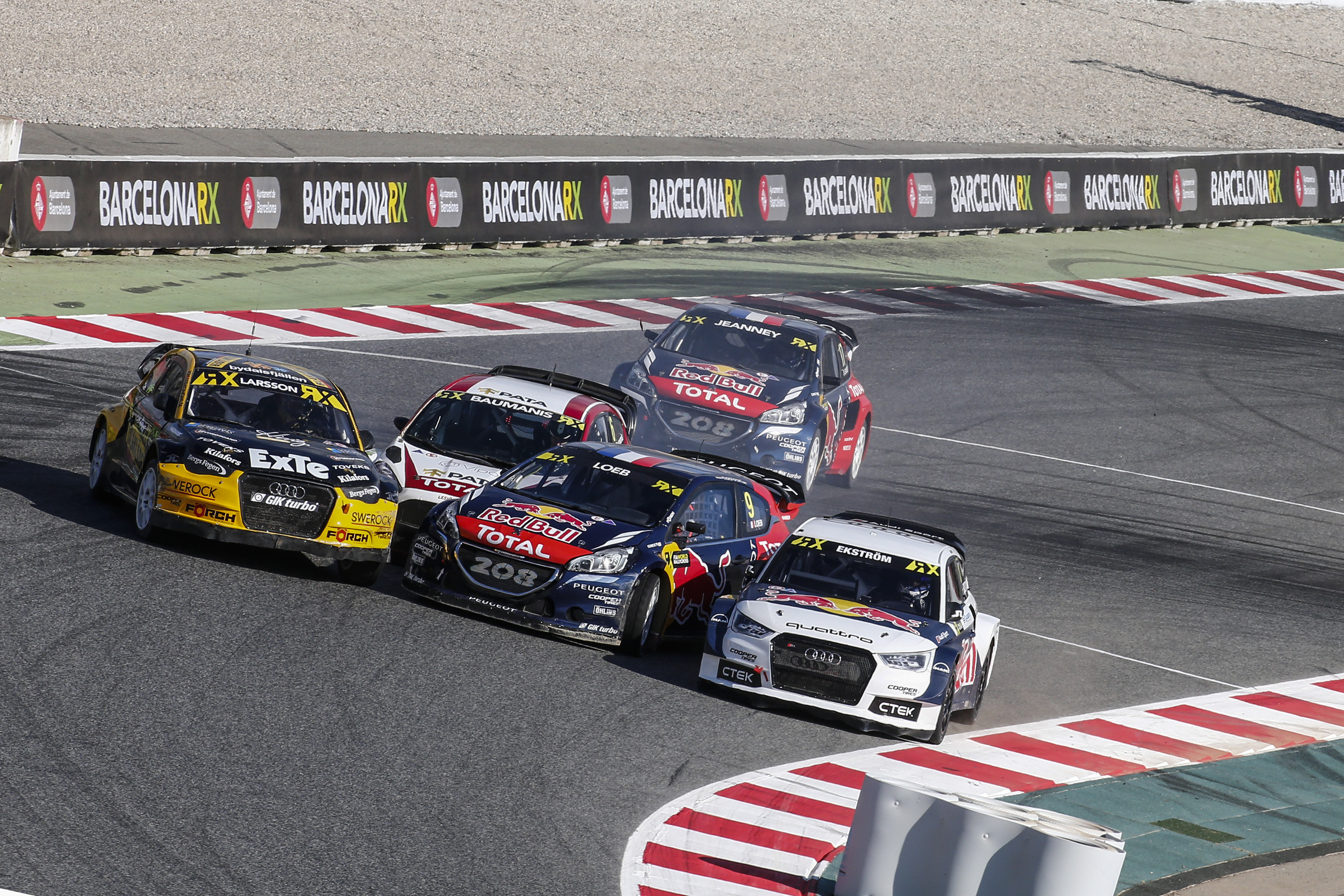
Qualifying Heat 2, Race 3 was won by Ekström, who was also Top Qualifier that round

Pos.	No.	Driver	Team	Car	Q1	Q2	Q3	Q4	Pts
1	21	(Sweden) Timmy Hansen	Team Peugeot-Hansen	Peugeot 208	1st	2nd	9th	2nd	16
2	3	(Sweden) Johan Kristoffersson	Volkswagen RX Sweden	Volkswagen Polo	5th	18th	1st	1st	15
3	5	(Sweden) Mattias Ekström	EKS RX	Audi S1	6th	1st	10th	3rd	14
4	13	(Norway) Andreas Bakkerud	Hoonigan Racing Division	Ford Focus RS	2nd	5th	5th	4th	13
5	9	(France) Sébastien Loeb	Team Peugeot-Hansen	Peugeot 208	7th	8th	2nd	6th	12
6	57	(Finland) Toomas Heikkinen	EKS RX	Audi S1	12th	4th	6th	5th	11
7	1	(Norway) Petter Solberg	Petter Solberg World RX Team	Citroën DS3	4th	3rd	12th	9th	10
8	6	(Latvia) Jānis Baumanis	World RX Team Austria	Ford Fiesta	8th	11th	8th	8th	9
9	4	(Sweden) Robin Larsson	Larsson Jernberg Motorsport	Audi A1	9th	7th	3rd	18th	8
10	7	(Russia) Timur Timerzyanov	World RX Team Austria	Ford Fiesta	3rd	14th	4th	19th	7
11	96	(Sweden) Kevin Eriksson	Olsbergs MSE	Ford Fiesta ST	13th	16th	7th	7th	6
12	17	(France) Davy Jeanney	Peugeot Hansen Academy	Peugeot 208	10th	12th	11th	10th	5
13	15	(Latvia) Reinis Nitišs	Olsbergs MSE	Ford Fiesta	16th	6th	15th	11th	4
14	92	(Sweden) Anton Marklund	Volkswagen RX Sweden	Volkswagen Polo	11th	9th	16th	15th	3
15	68	(Finland) Niclas Grönholm	Olsbergs MSE	Ford Fiesta ST	18th	13th	14th	12th	2
16	43	(United States) Ken Block	Hoonigan Racing Division	Ford Focus RS	15th	10th	18th	14th	1
17	44	(Germany) Timo Scheider	All-Inkl.com Münnich Motorsport	SEAT Ibiza	14th	20th	13th	13th	
18	77	(Germany) René Münnich	All-Inkl.com Münnich Motorsport	SEAT Ibiza	17th	15th	17th	17th	
19	37	(United Kingdom) Guy Wilks	JRM Racing	BMW MINI Countryman	20th	17th	20th	16th	
20	65	(France) Guerlain Chicherit	JRM Racing	BMW MINI Countryman	19th	19th	19th	20th	

=== Semi-finals ===
Semi-final 1

Pos.	No.	Driver	Team	Time	Pts
1	5	(Sweden) Mattias Ekström	EKS RX	5:00.299	6
2	21	(Sweden) Timmy Hansen	Team Peugeot-Hansen	+0.708	5
3	4	(Sweden) Robin Larsson	Larsson Jernberg Motorsport	+4.799	4
4	1	(Norway) Petter Solberg	Petter Solberg World RX Team	+5.527	3
5	96	(Sweden) Kevin Eriksson	Olsbergs MSE	+11.661	2
6	9	(France) Sébastien Loeb	Team Peugeot-Hansen	DNF	1

Semi-final 2

Pos.	No.	Driver	Team	Time	Pts
1	7	(Russia) Timur Timerzyanov	World RX Team Austria	4:58.583	6
2	3	(Sweden) Johan Kristoffersson	Volkswagen RX Sweden	+0.607	5
3	6	(Latvia) Jānis Baumanis	World RX Team Austria	+2.035	4
4	17	(France) Davy Jeanney	Peugeot Hansen Academy	+3.932	3
5	57	(Finland) Toomas Heikkinen	EKS RX	+4.284	2
	13	(Norway) Andreas Bakkerud	Hoonigan Racing Division	EX	0

=== Final ===
Pos.	No.	Driver	Team	Time	Pts
1	5	(Sweden) Mattias Ekström	EKS RX	4:55.251	8
2	21	(Sweden) Timmy Hansen	Team Peugeot-Hansen	+0.821	5
3	7	(Russia) Timur Timerzyanov	World RX Team Austria	+3.404	4
4	6	(Latvia) Jānis Baumanis	World RX Team Austria	+4.121	3
5	4	(Sweden) Robin Larsson	Larsson Jernberg Motorsport		2
	3	(Sweden) Johan Kristoffersson	Volkswagen RX Sweden	EX	0

== RX Lites ==
=== Heats ===
Pos.	No.	Driver	Team	Q1	Q2	Q3	Q4	Pts
1	13	(France) Cyril Raymond	Olsbergs MSE	1st	1st	1st	3rd	16
2	99	(Norway) Joachim Hvaal	JC Raceteknik	9th	5th	2nd	1st	15
3	16	(Norway) Thomas Bryntesson	JC Raceteknik	2nd	7th	4th	4th	14
4	8	(Norway) Simon Wågø Syversen	Set Promotion	7th	3rd	9th	2nd	13
5	52	(Sweden) Simon Olofsson	Simon Olofsson	4th	4th	3rd	7th	12
6	33	(Kenya) Tejas Hirani	Olsbergs MSE	3rd	2nd	10th	8th	11
7	69	(Norway) Sondre Evjen	JC Raceteknik	5th	6th	7th	9th	10
8	56	(Norway) Thomas Holmen	Thomas Holmen	8th	9th	6th	5th	9
9	66	(Andorra) Albert Llovera	Albert Llovera	6th	10th	8th	10th	8
10	64	(United Arab Emirates) Saeed Bintouq	Olsbergs MSE	10th	8th	5th	6th	7

=== Semi-finals ===
Semi-final 1

Pos.	No.	Driver	Team	Time	Pts
1	13	(France) Cyril Raymond	Olsbergs MSE	5:13.995	6
2	16	(Norway) Thomas Bryntesson	JC Raceteknik	+2.228	5
3	52	(Sweden) Simon Olofsson	Simon Olofsson	+5.425	4
4	69	(Norway) Sondre Evjen	JC Raceteknik	+5.943	3
5	66	(Andorra) Albert Llovera	Albert Llovera	+9.827	2

Semi-final 2

Pos.	No.	Driver	Team	Time	Pts
1	8	(Norway) Simon Wågø Syversen	Set Promotion	5:20.762	6
2	33	(Kenya) Tejas Hirani	Olsbergs MSE	+2.656	5
3	56	(Norway) Thomas Holmen	Thomas Holmen	+6.596	4
4	99	(Norway) Joachim Hvaal	JC Raceteknik	+7.049	3
5	64	(United Arab Emirates) Saeed Bintouq	Olsbergs MSE	DNF	2

=== Final ===
Pos.	No.	Driver	Team	Time	Pts
1	13	(France) Cyril Raymond	Olsbergs MSE	5:17.408	8
2	16	(Norway) Thomas Bryntesson	JC Raceteknik	+0.588	5
3	8	(Norway) Simon Wågø Syversen	Set Promotion	+2.806	4
4	52	(Sweden) Simon Olofsson	Simon Olofsson	+4.801	3
5	56	(Norway) Thomas Holmen	Thomas Holmen	+5.291	2
6	33	(Kenya) Tejas Hirani	Olsbergs MSE	DNF	1

== Standings after the event ==
Supercar standings

Pos	Driver	Pts	Gap
1	(Sweden) Mattias Ekström	204	
2	(Norway) Petter Solberg	194	+10
3	(Sweden) Johan Kristoffersson	178	+26
4	(Norway) Andreas Bakkerud	170	+34
5	(France) Sébastien Loeb	154	+50

RX Lites standings

Pos	Driver	Pts	Gap
1	(France) Cyril Raymond	158	
2	(Norway) Thomas Bryntesson	150	+8
3	(Sweden) Simon Olofsson	128	+30
4	(Norway) Joachim Hvaal	115	+43
5	(Norway) Simon Wågø Syversen	103	+55

- Note: Only the top five positions are included.

Previous race: 2016 World RX of France	FIA World Rallycross Championship; 2016 season	Next race: 2016 World RX of Latvia
Previous race: 2015 World RX of Barcelona	World RX of Barcelona	Next race: 2017 World RX of Barcelona
