= 2016 World RX of Belgium =

Rallycross event

- Round 3 of 12 in the 2016 FIA World Rallycross Championship
- Date: 14–15 May 2016
- Location: Mettet, Wallonia
- Venue: Circuit Jules Tacheny Mettet

Results
Heat winners
- Heat 1: (France) Sébastien Loeb; Team Peugeot-Hansen
- Heat 2: (Sweden) Mattias Ekström; EKS RX
- Heat 3: (Sweden) Mattias Ekström; EKS RX
- Heat 4: (Norway) Petter Solberg; Petter Solberg World RX Team
Semi-final winners
- Semi-final 1: (Sweden) Mattias Ekström; EKS RX
- Semi-final 2: (Norway) Petter Solberg; Petter Solberg World RX Team
Final
- First: (Sweden) Mattias Ekström; EKS RX
- Second: (France) Sébastien Loeb; Team Peugeot-Hansen
- Third: (Norway) Petter Solberg; Petter Solberg World RX Team

World RX layout of Circuit Jules Tacheny Mettet

The 2016 World RX of Belgium was the third round of the third season of the FIA World Rallycross Championship. The event was held at the Circuit Jules Tacheny Mettet in Mettet, Wallonia and also played host to the second round of the 2016 FIA European Rallycross Championship.

== Supercar ==
=== Heats ===
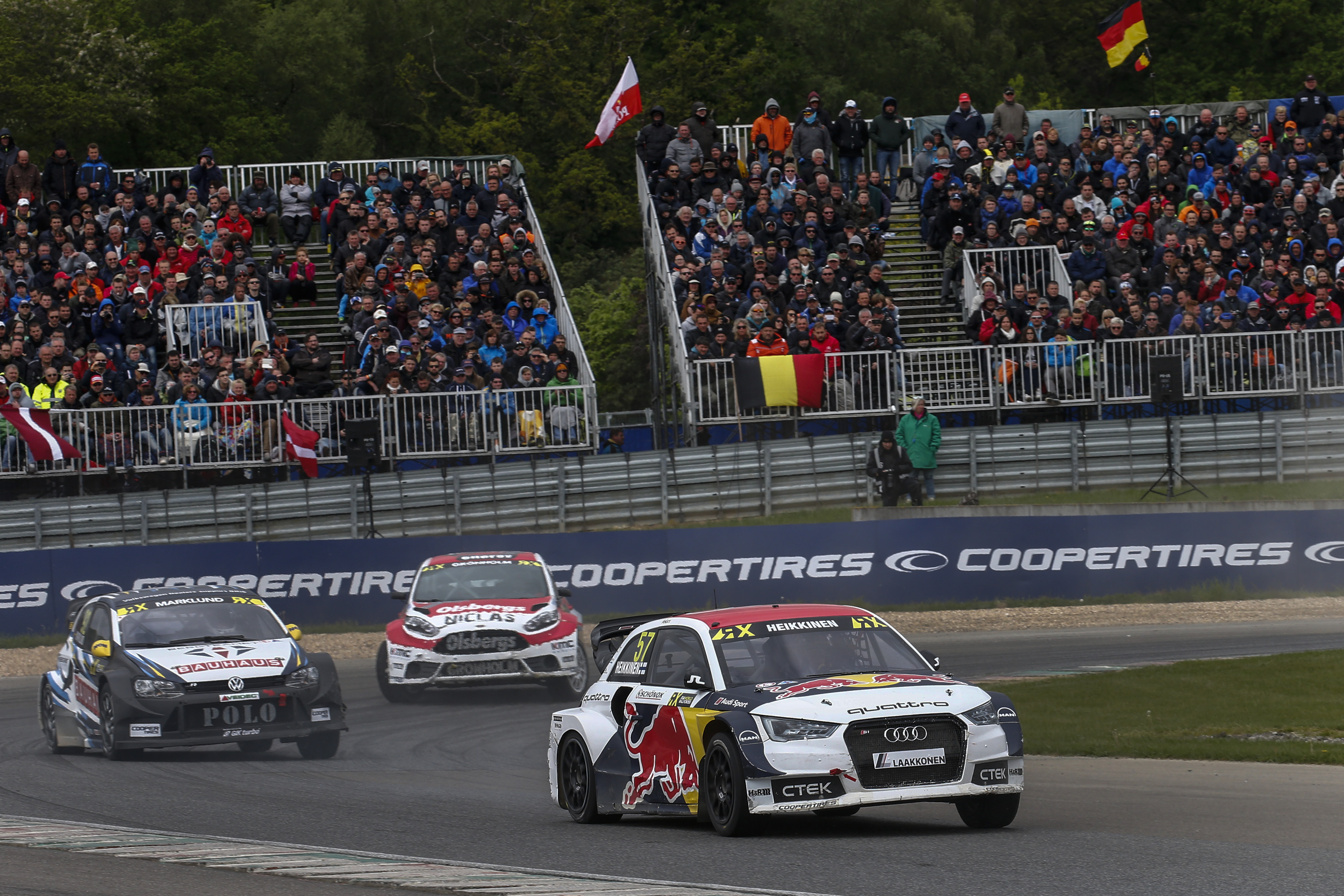
Toomas Heikkinen, Anton Marklund and Niclas Grönholm

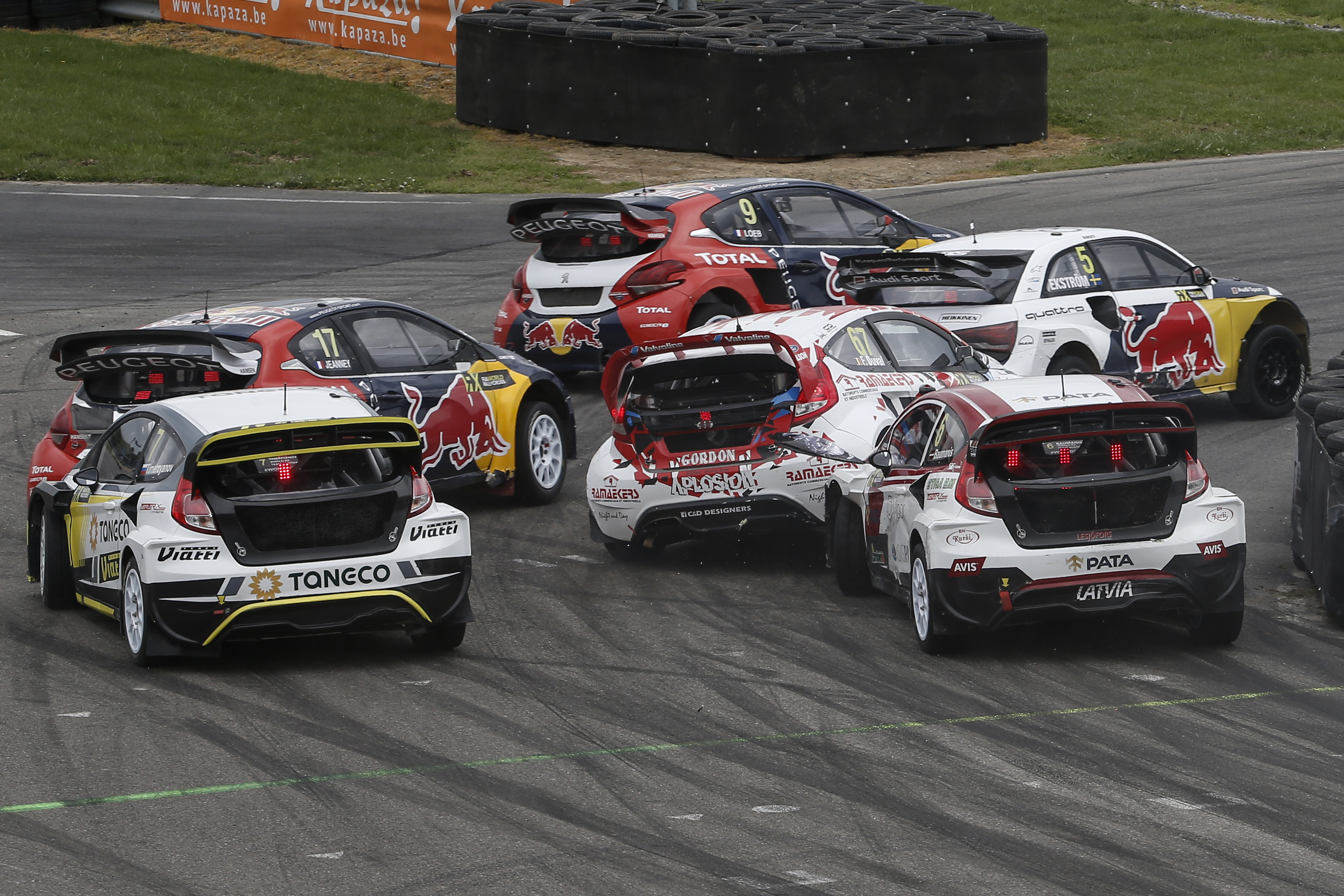
The field files into the first corner in the 1st WRX Semi-Final

Pos.	No.	Driver	Team	Car	Q1	Q2	Q3	Q4	Pts
1	5	(Sweden) Mattias Ekström	EKS RX	Audi S1	2nd	1st	1st	9th	16
2	1	(Norway) Petter Solberg	Petter Solberg World RX Team	Citroën DS3	3rd	4th	2nd	1st	15
3	9	(France) Sébastien Loeb	Team Peugeot-Hansen	Peugeot 208	1st	7th	3rd	2nd	14
4	3	(Sweden) Johan Kristoffersson	Volkswagen RX Sweden	Volkswagen Polo	4th	3rd	4th	5th	13
5	67	(Belgium) François Duval	Ecurie Bayard ASBL	Ford Fiesta	6th	11th	7th	4th	12
6	21	(Sweden) Timmy Hansen	Team Peugeot-Hansen	Peugeot 208	12th	5th	5th	8th	11
7	6	(Latvia) Jānis Baumanis	World RX Team Austria	Ford Fiesta	8th	6th	8th	14th	10
8	92	(Sweden) Anton Marklund	Volkswagen RX Sweden	Volkswagen Polo	5th	9th	13th	10th	9
9	7	(Russia) Timur Timerzyanov	World RX Team Austria	Ford Fiesta	7th	2nd	18th	13th	8
10	96	(Sweden) Kevin Eriksson	Olsbergs MSE	Ford Fiesta ST	13th	10th	10th	7th	7
11	17	(France) Davy Jeanney	Peugeot Hansen Academy	Peugeot 208	9th	15th	6th	12th	6
12	15	(Latvia) Reinis Nitišs	All-Inkl.com Münnich Motorsport	SEAT Ibiza	10th	12th	15th	6th	5
13	4	(Sweden) Robin Larsson	Larsson Jernberg Motorsport	Audi A1	17th	8th	9th	16th	4
14	13	(Norway) Andreas Bakkerud	Hoonigan Racing Division	Ford Focus RS	19th	13th	17th	3rd	3
15	68	(Finland) Niclas Grönholm	Olsbergs MSE	Ford Fiesta ST	14th	16th	12th	15th	2
16	57	(Finland) Toomas Heikkinen	EKS RX	Audi S1	16th	14th	11th	17th	1
17	33	(United Kingdom) Liam Doran	JRM Racing	BMW MINI Countryman	11th	18th	16th	18th	
18	43	(United States) Ken Block	Hoonigan Racing Division	Ford Focus RS	18th	19th	19th	11th	
19	55	(Germany) René Münnich	All-Inkl.com Münnich Motorsport	SEAT Ibiza	15th	17th	14th	19th	

=== Semi-finals ===
Semi-final 1

Pos.	No.	Driver	Team	Time	Pts
1	5	(Sweden) Mattias Ekström	EKS RX	4:02.278	6
2	9	(France) Sébastien Loeb	Team Peugeot-Hansen	+1.737	5
3	67	(Belgium) François Duval	Ecurie Bayard ASBL	+7.884	4
4	7	(Russia) Timur Timerzyanov	World RX Team Austria	+23.056	3
5	17	(France) Davy Jeanney	Peugeot Hansen Academy	DNF	2
	6	(Latvia) Jānis Baumanis	World RX Team Austria	EX	0

Semi-final 2

Pos.	No.	Driver	Team	Time	Pts
1	1	(Norway) Petter Solberg	Petter Solberg World RX Team	4:00.869	6
2	3	(Sweden) Johan Kristoffersson	Volkswagen RX Sweden	+1.157	5
3	92	(Sweden) Anton Marklund	Volkswagen RX Sweden	+5.112	4
4	21	(Sweden) Timmy Hansen	Team Peugeot-Hansen	+5.950	3
5	96	(Sweden) Kevin Eriksson	Olsbergs MSE	+14.568	2
6	15	(Latvia) Reinis Nitišs	All-Inkl.com Münnich Motorsport	+16.468	1

=== Final ===
Pos.	No.	Driver	Team	Time	Pts
1	5	(Sweden) Mattias Ekström	EKS RX	3:58.967	8
2	9	(France) Sébastien Loeb	Team Peugeot-Hansen	+2.526	5
3	1	(Norway) Petter Solberg	Petter Solberg World RX Team	+3.189	3
4	92	(Sweden) Anton Marklund	Volkswagen RX Sweden	+10.868	4
5	67	(Belgium) François Duval	Ecurie Bayard ASBL	+18.972	2
6	3	(Sweden) Johan Kristoffersson	Volkswagen RX Sweden	DNF	1

== RX Lites ==
=== Heats ===
Pos.	No.	Driver	Team	Q1	Q2	Q3	Q4	Pts
1	13	(France) Cyril Raymond	Olsbergs MSE	7th	6th	1st	1st	16
2	69	(Norway) Sondre Evjen	JC Raceteknik	6th	1st	5th	5th	15
3	52	(Sweden) Simon Olofsson	Simon Olofsson	4th	5th	6th	2nd	14
4	8	(Norway) Simon Wågø Syversen	Set Promotion	1st	4th	9th	6th	13
5	16	(Norway) Thomas Bryntesson	JC Raceteknik	2nd	2nd	8th	7th	12
6	99	(Norway) Joachim Hvaal	JC Raceteknik	9th	3rd	3rd	3rd	11
7	33	(Kenya) Tejas Hirani	Olsbergs MSE	3rd	7th	4th	4th	10
8	26	(Belgium) Gosselin Regis	Icepol Racing Team	5th	8th	2nd	9th	9
9	47	(Sweden) Alexander Westlund	Alexander Westlund	8th	9th	7th	8th	8

=== Semi-finals ===
Semi-final 1

Pos.	No.	Driver	Team	Time	Pts
1	16	(Norway) Thomas Bryntesson	JC Raceteknik	4:18.959	6
2	13	(France) Cyril Raymond	Olsbergs MSE	+0.163	5
3	52	(Sweden) Simon Olofsson	Simon Olofsson	+1.083	4
4	33	(Kenya) Tejas Hirani	Olsbergs MSE	+8.287	3
5	47	(Sweden) Alexander Westlund	Alexander Westlund	+10.250	2

Semi-final 2

Pos.	No.	Driver	Team	Time	Pts
1	69	(Norway) Sondre Evjen	JC Raceteknik	4:21.505	6
2	99	(Norway) Joachim Hvaal	JC Raceteknik	+0.649	5
3	8	(Norway) Simon Wågø Syversen	Set Promotion	+4.274	4
4	26	(Belgium) Gosselin Regis	Icepol Racing Team	DNF	3

=== Final ===
Pos.	No.	Driver	Team	Time/Retired	Pts
1	16	(Norway) Thomas Bryntesson	JC Raceteknik	4:19.061	8
2	52	(Sweden) Simon Olofsson	Simon Olofsson	+1.506	5
3	99	(Norway) Joachim Hvaal	JC Raceteknik	+2.324	4
4	69	(Norway) Sondre Evjen	JC Raceteknik	+18.669	3
5	8	(Norway) Simon Wågø Syversen	Set Promotion	DNF	2
	13	(France) Cyril Raymond	Olsbergs MSE	EX	0

== Standings after the event ==
Supercar standings

Pos	Pilot	Pts	Gap
1	(Sweden) Mattias Ekström	78	
2	(Norway) Petter Solberg	73	+5
3	(Sweden) Johan Kristoffersson	58	+20
4	(France) Sébastien Loeb	54	+24
5	(Finland) Toomas Heikkinen	46	+32

RX Lites standings

Pos	Driver	Pts	Gap
1	(Norway) Thomas Bryntesson	56	
2	(France) Cyril Raymond	46	+10
3	(Norway) Joachim Hvaal	43	+13
4	(Sweden) Simon Olofsson	38	+18
5	(Norway) Simon Wågø Syversen	36	+20

- Note: Only the top five positions are included.

Previous race: 2016 World RX of Hockenheim	FIA World Rallycross Championship; 2016 season	Next race: 2016 World RX of Great Britain
Previous race: 2015 World RX of Belgium	World RX of Belgium	Next race: 2017 World RX of Belgium
