= 2015 FIA World Rallycross Championship =

Auto racing championship

The 2015 FIA World Rallycross Championship presented by Monster Energy was the second season of the FIA World Rallycross Championship. The season consisted of thirteen rounds and started on 25 April with the Portuguese round at Montalegre. The season ended on 29 November, at Rosario, Santa Fe in Argentina.

== Calendar ==
On 20 February 2015 it was announced that the series would support the opening round of the 2015 Deutsche Tourenwagen Masters season, at Hockenheim.

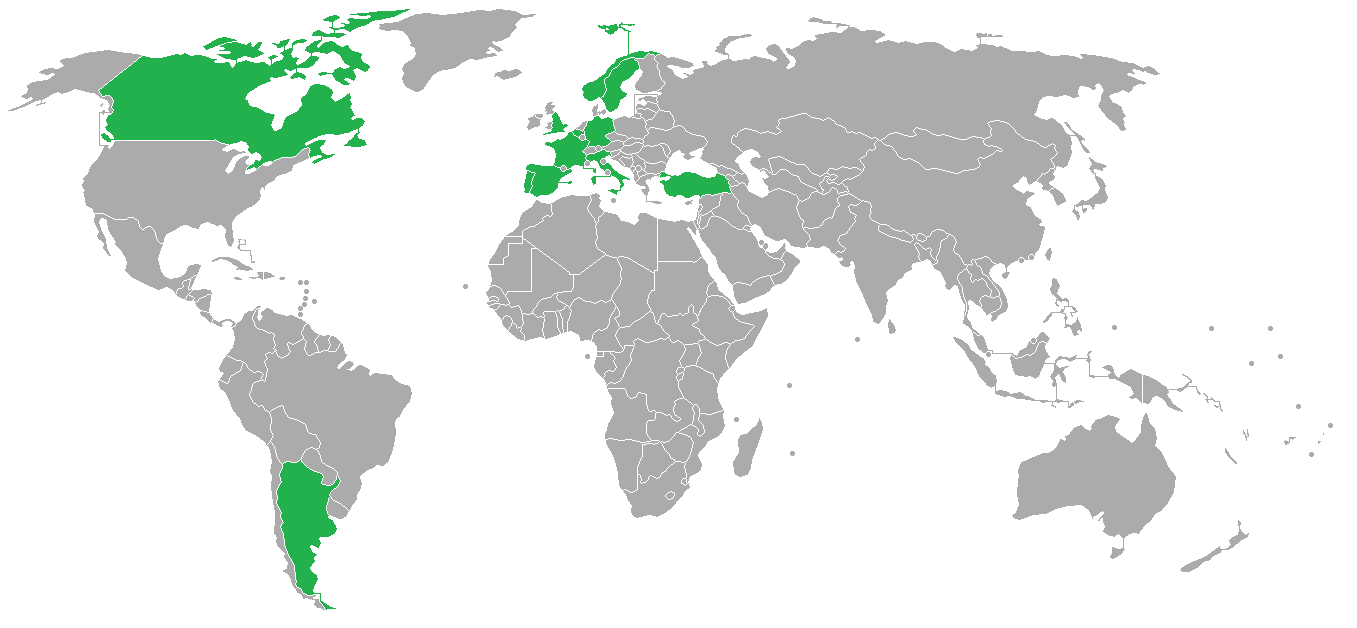
2015 World RX calendar by nations

Rnd.	Event	Dates	Venue	Class	Winner	Team	Report
1	World RX of Portugal	25–26 April	Pista Automóvel de Montalegre, Montalegre	Supercar	(Sweden) Johan Kristoffersson	Volkswagen Team Sweden	Report
1	World RX of Portugal	25–26 April	Pista Automóvel de Montalegre, Montalegre	RX Lites	(Sweden) Kevin Eriksson	(Sweden) Olsbergs MSE	Report
2	(Germany) World RX of Hockenheim	1–3 May	Hockenheimring, Hockenheim	Supercar	(Norway) Petter Solberg	(Sweden) SDRX	Report
3	World RX of Belgium	16–17 May	Circuit Jules Tacheny Mettet, Mettet	Supercar	(Finland) Toomas Heikkinen	(Sweden) Marklund Motorsport	Report
4	(United Kingdom) World RX of Great Britain	21–24 May	Lydden Hill Race Circuit, Wootton	Supercar	(Norway) Petter Solberg	(Sweden) SDRX	Report
4	(United Kingdom) World RX of Great Britain	21–24 May	Lydden Hill Race Circuit, Wootton	RX Lites	(Sweden) Kevin Hansen	(Sweden) Hansen Junior Team	Report
5	World RX of Germany	20–21 June	Estering, Buxtehude	Supercar	(France) Davy Jeanney	(Sweden) Hansen Motorsport	Report
6	World RX of Sweden	4–5 July	Höljesbanan, Höljes	Supercar	(Sweden) Mattias Ekström	(Sweden) EKS RX	Report
6	World RX of Sweden	4–5 July	Höljesbanan, Höljes	RX Lites	(Norway) Thomas Bryntesson	(Sweden) TBRX	Report
7	World RX of Canada	7–8 August	Circuit Trois-Rivières, Trois-Rivières	Supercar	(France) Davy Jeanney	(Sweden) Team Peugeot-Hansen	Report
8	World RX of Norway	22–23 August	Lånkebanen, Hell	Supercar	(Sweden) Timmy Hansen	(Sweden) Team Peugeot-Hansen	Report
8	World RX of Norway	22–23 August	Lånkebanen, Hell	RX Lites	(Norway) Thomas Bryntesson	(Sweden) TBRX	Report
9	World RX of France	5–6 September	Circuit de Lohéac, Lohéac	Supercar	(Sweden) Timmy Hansen	(Sweden) Team Peugeot-Hansen	Report
10	(Spain) World RX of Barcelona	19–20 September	Circuit de Barcelona-Catalunya, Montmeló	Supercar	(Norway) Petter Solberg	(Sweden) SDRX	Report
10	(Spain) World RX of Barcelona	19–20 September	Circuit de Barcelona-Catalunya, Montmeló	RX Lites	(Norway) Thomas Bryntesson	(Sweden) TBRX	Report
11	World RX of Turkey	3-4 October	Istanbul Park, Tuzla	Supercar	(Sweden) Timmy Hansen	(Sweden) Team Peugeot-Hansen	Report
11	World RX of Turkey	3-4 October	Istanbul Park, Tuzla	RX Lites	(Norway) Thomas Bryntesson	(Sweden) TBRX	Report
12	World RX of Italy	17–18 October	Autodromo di Franciacorta, Castrezzato	Supercar	(Norway) Andreas Bakkerud	(Sweden) Olsbergs MSE	Report
12	World RX of Italy	17–18 October	Autodromo di Franciacorta, Castrezzato	RX Lites	(Sweden) Kevin Eriksson	(Sweden) Olsbergs MSE	Report
13	World RX of Argentina	28–29 November	Autódromo Rosario, Rosario, Santa Fe	Supercar	(Sweden) Robin Larsson	(Sweden) Larsson Jernberg Racing Team	Report

Event of FIA ERX (including Supercars)
Event of FIA ERX (except Supercars)

== Teams and drivers ==
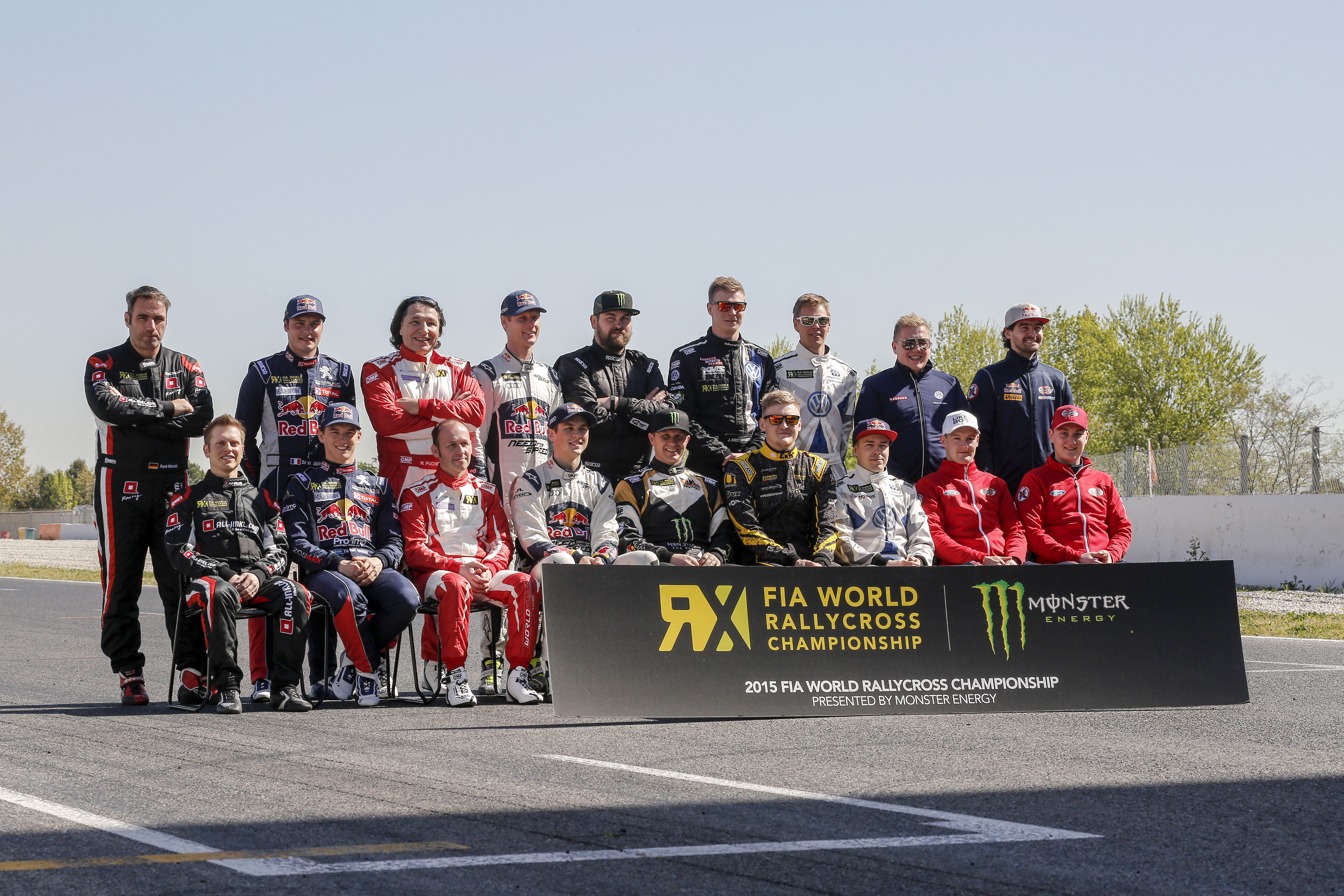
The permanent entries for the 2015 season, with Edward Sandström filling in for Mattias Ekström

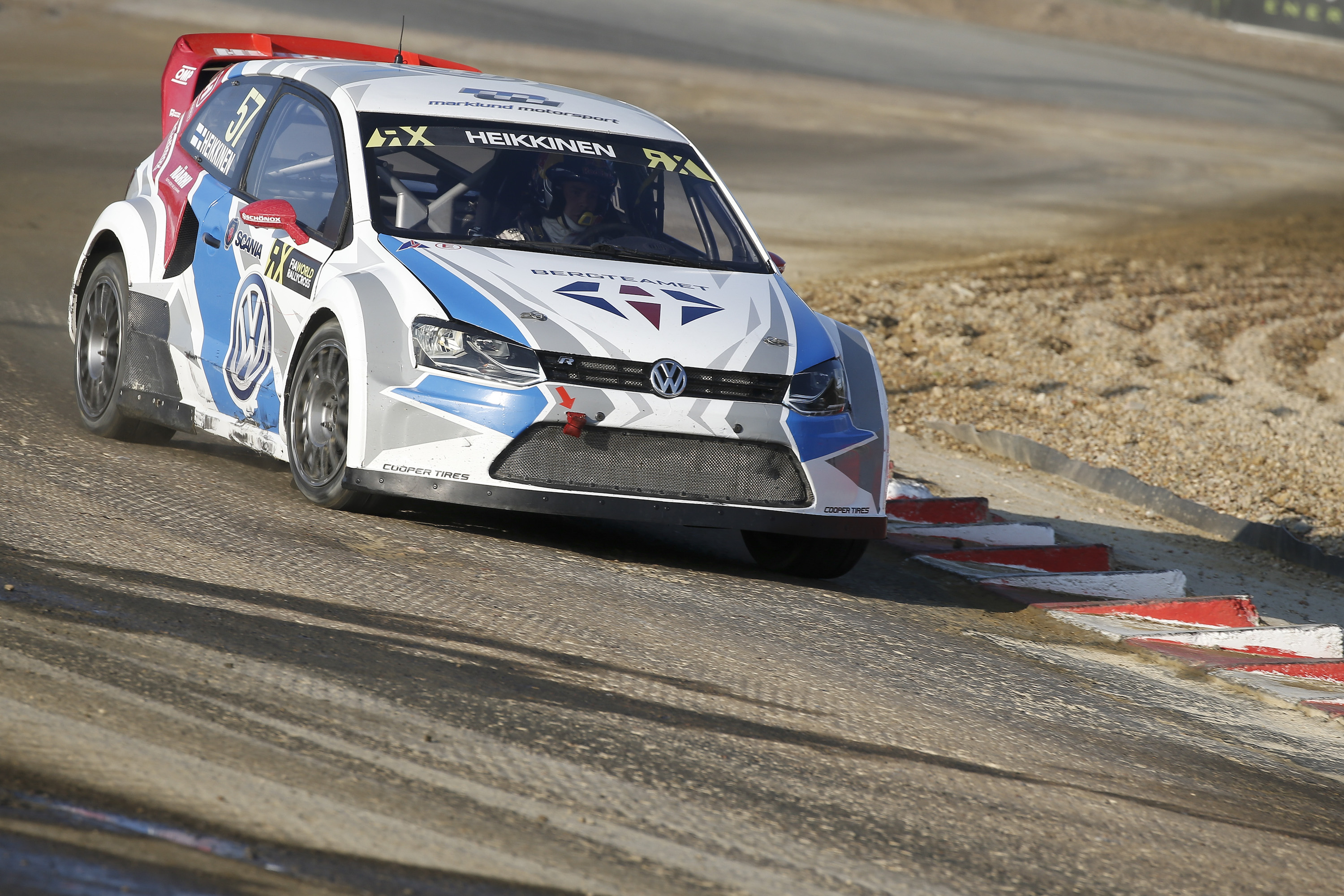
Toomas Heikkinen at the 2015 World RX of France

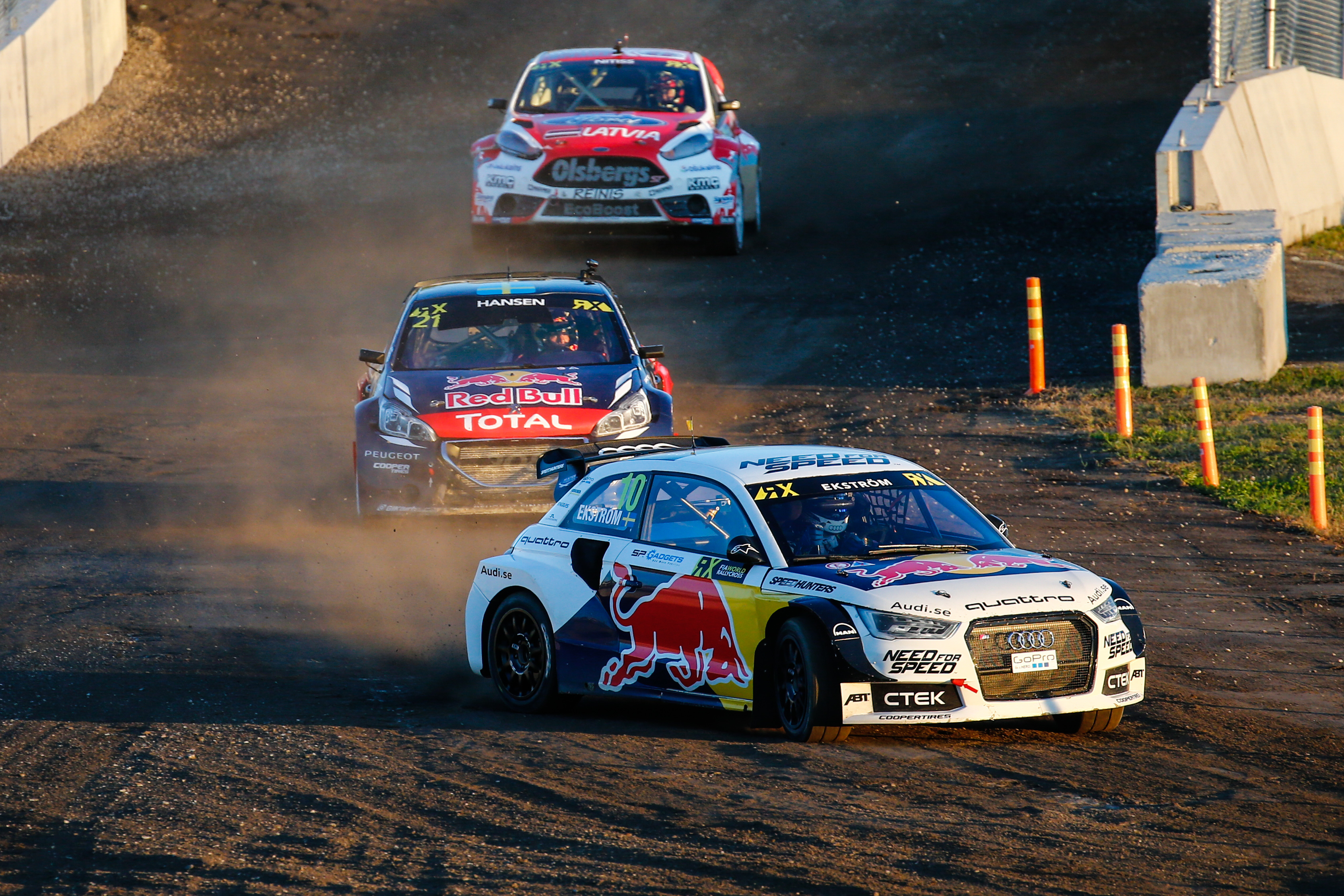
Mattias Ekström leads Timmy Hansen and Reinis Nitišs at the 2015 World RX of Canada

Permanent entries
Constructor	Entrant	Car	No.	Driver	Rounds
Audi	(Sweden) Larsson Jernberg Racing Team	Audi A1	4	(Sweden) Robin Larsson	All
Audi	(Sweden) EKS RX	Audi S1	5	(Sweden) Edward Sandström	2
Audi	(Sweden) EKS RX	Audi S1	10	(Sweden) Mattias Ekström	1, 3–11, 13
Audi	(Sweden) EKS RX	Audi S1	92	(Sweden) Anton Marklund	1–6, 8–13
Audi	(United Kingdom) EKS Pirtek Racing	Audi S1	177	(United Kingdom) Andrew Jordan	12
Audi	(Germany) All-Inkl.com Münnich Motorsport	Audi S3	24	(Norway) Tommy Rustad	7
Audi	(Germany) All-Inkl.com Münnich Motorsport	Audi S3	44	(Germany) Timo Scheider	10
Audi	(Germany) All-Inkl.com Münnich Motorsport	Audi S3	55	(Sweden) Alx Danielsson	1–6, 8–11
Audi	(Germany) All-Inkl.com Münnich Motorsport	Audi S3	77	(Germany) René Münnich	1–9, 11–13
Audi	(Germany) All-Inkl.com Münnich Motorsport	Audi S3	110	(Italy) Gianni Morbidelli	12–13
Citroën	(Sweden) SDRX	Citroën DS3 RX	1	(Norway) Petter Solberg	All
Citroën	(Sweden) SDRX	Citroën DS3 RX	33	(United Kingdom) Liam Doran	1–4, 6–13
Ford	(Sweden) Olsbergs MSE	Ford Fiesta ST	13	(Norway) Andreas Bakkerud	All
Ford	(Sweden) Olsbergs MSE	Ford Fiesta ST	15	(Latvia) Reinis Nitišs	All
Ford	(Sweden) Namus OMSE	Ford Fiesta ST	42	(Russia) Timur Timerzyanov	All
Ford	World RX Team Austria	Ford Fiesta	7	(Austria) Manfred Stohl	All
Ford	World RX Team Austria	Ford Fiesta	31	(Austria) Max Pucher	1–6, 8–12
Ford	World RX Team Austria	Ford Fiesta	70	(Austria) Christoph Brugger	7–8
Ford	World RX Team Austria	Ford Fiesta	199	(Latvia) Jānis Baumanis	13
Peugeot	(Sweden) Team Peugeot-Hansen	Peugeot 208 WRX	17	(France) Davy Jeanney	All
Peugeot	(Sweden) Team Peugeot-Hansen	Peugeot 208 WRX	21	(Sweden) Timmy Hansen	All
Peugeot	(Sweden) Team Peugeot-Hansen	Peugeot 208 WRX	177	(United Kingdom) Andrew Jordan	4
Volkswagen	(Sweden) EKS RX	Volkswagen Polo	92	(Sweden) Anton Marklund	7
Volkswagen	(Sweden) Marklund Motorsport	Volkswagen Polo	34	(United States) Tanner Foust	2, 4, 7, 10
Volkswagen	(Sweden) Marklund Motorsport	Volkswagen Polo	45	(Sweden) Per-Gunnar Andersson	1–6, 8–12
Volkswagen	(Sweden) Marklund Motorsport	Volkswagen Polo	57	(Finland) Toomas Heikkinen	All
Volkswagen	(Sweden) Marklund Motorsport	Volkswagen Polo	100	(Norway) Thomas Bryntesson	13
Volkswagen	Volkswagen Team Sweden	Volkswagen Polo	3	(Sweden) Johan Kristoffersson	All
Volkswagen	Volkswagen Team Sweden	Volkswagen Polo	52	(Norway) Ole Christian Veiby	6, 13
Volkswagen	Volkswagen Team Sweden	Volkswagen Polo	99	(Norway) Tord Linnerud	1–12
Entries ineligible to score team points: Constructor / Entrant / Car / No. / Driver / Rounds; Citroën / (Norway) JC Race Teknik / Citroën DS3 RX / 28 / (Norway) Alexander Hvaal / 6, 8, 11; Citroën / (Lebanon) Nabil Karam / Citroën DS3 RX / 64 / (Lebanon) Nabil Karam / 9; Citroën / (Portugal) Mário Barbosa / Citroën DS3 RX / 76 / (Portugal) Mário Barbosa / 1; Citroën / (France) Christophe Jouet / Citroën DS3 RX / 79 / (France) Christophe Jouet / 10; Citroën / (France) Hervé "Knapick" Lemonnier / Citroën DS3 RX / 84 / (France) "Knapick" / 9-10; Citroën / (Norway) Ole Kristian Temte / Citroën C4 / 30 / (Norway) Ole Kristian Temte / 6, 8; Citroën / (France) Marc Laboulle / Citroën C4 / 71 / (France) Marc Laboulle / 4, 9; Citroën / (France) Jean-Baptiste Dubourg / Citroën C4 / 87 / (France) Jean-Baptiste Dubourg / 1, 6, 9; Ford / (Republic of Ireland) Oliver O'Donovan / Ford Fiesta ST / 2 / (Republic of Ireland) Oliver O'Donovan / 4; Ford / (Sweden) Olsbergs MSE / Ford Fiesta ST / 88 / (Norway) Henning Solberg / 8; Ford / (Sweden) Olsbergs MSE / Ford Fiesta ST / 98 / (Sweden) Kevin Hansen / 13; Ford / (Finland) Niclas Grönholm / Ford Fiesta ST / 29 / (Finland) Niclas Grönholm / 6; Ford / (United Kingdom) Kevin Procter / Ford Fiesta ST / 50 / (United Kingdom) Kevin Procter / 4; Ford / (United Kingdom) Julian Godfrey / Ford Fiesta ST / 51 / (United Kingdom) Julian Godfrey / 4; Ford / (Belgium) Koen Pauwels / Ford Focus / 22 / (Belgium) Koen Pauwels / 2; Ford / (Portugal) Bompiso Racing Team / Ford Focus / 41 / (Portugal) Joaquim Santos / 1; Ford / (United Kingdom) Mark Flaherty / Ford Focus / 49 / (United Kingdom) Mark Flaherty / 10; Ford / (Belgium) Ecurie Bayard ASBL / Ford Focus / 67 / (Belgium) François Duval / 9; Ford / (Norway) CircleX / Ford Focus / 88 / (Norway) Henning Solberg / 6; Hyundai / (Norway) Frode Holte Motorsport / Hyundai i20 / 14 / (Norway) Frode Holte / 6; Kia / (Italy) Gigi Galli / Kia Rio / 25 / (Italy) Gigi Galli / 12; Mini / (United Kingdom) JRM Racing / Mini Countryman RX / 37 / (United Kingdom) Guy Wilks / 4, 9; Mini / (United Kingdom) JRM Racing / Mini Countryman RX / 39 / (United States) Danny Way / 2; Mini / (United Kingdom) JRM Racing / Mini Countryman RX / 40 / (United States) Dave Mirra / 2; Mini / (United Kingdom) JRM Racing / Mini Countryman RX / 65 / (France) Guerlain Chicherit / 9, 12; Mini / (United Kingdom) JRM Racing / Mini Countryman RX / 82 / (Canada) Patrick Carpentier / 7; Mini / (United Kingdom) JRM Racing / Mini Countryman RX / 147 / (Canada) Louis-Philippe Dumoulin / 7; Peugeot / (United Kingdom) Albatec Racing / Peugeot 208 / 26 / (United Kingdom) Andy Scott / 4; Peugeot / (United Kingdom) Albatec Racing / Peugeot 208 / 74 / (France) Jérôme Grosset-Janin / 9; Peugeot / (United Kingdom) Albatec Racing / Peugeot 208 / 81 / (United Kingdom) David Binks / 4; Peugeot / (United Kingdom) Albatec Racing / Peugeot 208 / 168 / (France) Yvan Muller / 9; Peugeot / (United Kingdom) Albatec Racing / Peugeot 208 / 146 / (Finland) Kristian Sohlberg / 11; Peugeot / (Sweden) Hansen Talent Development / Peugeot 208 / 90 / (Sweden) Eric Färén / 6; Peugeot / (Sweden) Hansen Talent Development / Peugeot 208 / 199 / (Latvia) Jānis Baumanis / 4, 11; Peugeot / (France) Pailler Compétition / Peugeot 208 / 18 / (France) Jonathan Pailler / 9; Peugeot / (France) Pailler Compétition / Peugeot 208 / 20 / (France) Fabien Pailler / 9; Peugeot / (France) Gilles Franco / Peugeot 208 / 56 / (France) Gilles Franco / 9; Peugeot / (France) Gaëtan Sérazin / Peugeot 208 / 62 / (France) Gaëtan Sérazin / 9, 12; Peugeot / (France) Laurent Bouliou / Peugeot 207 / 78 / (France) Laurent Bouliou / 9; Renault / (Sweden) Helmia Motorsport / Renault Clio / 23 / (Sweden) Stig-Olov Walfridson / 6; Renault / (Sweden) Helmia Motorsport / Renault Clio / 48 / (Sweden) Lukas Walfridson / 6; Renault / (France) Fabien Chanoine / Renault Clio / 89 / (France) Fabien Chanoine / 9; Renault / (France) David Olivier / Renault Logan / 85 / (France) David Olivier / 9; Škoda / (Sweden) Peter Hedström / Škoda Fabia / 8 / (Sweden) Peter Hedström / 6; Škoda / (Hungary) Racing-Com KFT / Škoda Fabia / 102 / (Hungary) Tamás Kárai / 6, 9; Volkswagen / (Sweden) Eklund Motorsport / Volkswagen Beetle / 53 / (Norway) Daniel Holten / 6, 8; Volkswagen / (Sweden) Eklund Motorsport / Volkswagen Beetle / 88 / (Norway) Henning Solberg / 10; Volkswagen / (Sweden) Eklund Motorsport / Volkswagen Beetle / 101 / (Sweden) Per Eklund / 6; Volkswagen / (Sweden) HTB Racing-Marklund Motorsport / Volkswagen Polo / 24 / (Norway) Tommy Rustad / 6; Volkswagen / (Sweden) Ramona RX / Volkswagen Scirocco / 47 / (Sweden) Ramona Karlsson / 6; Volvo / (Norway) CircleX / Volvo C30 / 32 / (Norway) Ole Kristian Nøttveit / 3, 6; Volvo / (Norway) CircleX / Volvo C30 / 91 / (Norway) Guttorm Lindefjell / 4; Volvo / (Sweden) Mats Öhman / Volvo S40 / 46 / (Sweden) Mats Öhman / 8

== Championship Standings ==
=== FIA World Rallycross Championship for Drivers ===
Pos.	Driver	POR (Portugal)	HOC (Germany)	BEL (Belgium)	GBR (United Kingdom)	GER (Germany)	SWE (Sweden)	CAN (Canada)	NOR (Norway)	FRA (France)	BAR (Spain)	TUR (Turkey)	ITA (Italy)	ARG (Argentina)	Points
1	(Norway) Petter Solberg	2	1	2	1	2	6	8	7	2	1	8	3	3	301
2	(Sweden) Timmy Hansen	3	3	8	8	3	2	7	1	1	3	1	7	6	275
3	(Sweden) Johan Kristoffersson	1	8	7	3	4	7	11	10	4	2	3	2	13	234
4	(Norway) Andreas Bakkerud	5	6	5	4	6	3	5	11	8	10	2	1	7	232
5	(France) Davy Jeanney	4	10	9	11	1	8	1	2	11	4	5	10	8	201
=	(Sweden) Mattias Ekström	7		6	2	15	1	6	12	5	7	4		2	201
7	(Latvia) Reinis Nitišs	11	2	3	5	7	5	9	9	16	9	7	9	14	167
8	(Sweden) Robin Larsson	9	5	15	12	9	34	18	3	6	6	10	8	1	147
9	(Finland) Toomas Heikkinen	8	4	1	15	13	4	2	19	7	8	14	13	9	137
10	(Russia) Timur Timerzyanov	10	15	13	18	11	11	12	6	10	11	9	6	17	105
11	(Austria) Manfred Stohl	12	14	11	10	8	13	10	14	21	13	13	5	12	82
12	(Sweden) Anton Marklund	17	20	10	14	10	25	13	8	9	15	6	4	11	78
13	(Sweden) Per-Gunnar Andersson	6	12	4	13	14	16		5	13		20	14		70
14	(Norway) Tord Linnerud	16	11	12	9	5	21	20	15	18	12	11	11		49
15	(United States) Tanner Foust		9		16			3			5				44
16	(United Kingdom) Liam Doran	15	7	14	17		14	15	18	17	18	21	12	15	35
17	(France) Jean-Baptiste Dubourg	13					18			3					24
=	(Norway) Tommy Rustad						12	4							24
19	(Norway) Ole Christian Veiby						9							10	19
20	(Latvia) Jānis Baumanis				20							17		4	18
21	(Sweden) Alx Danielsson	21	16	18	29	16	20		4	15	17	19			17
22	(Sweden) Kevin Hansen													5	16
23	(United Kingdom) Guy Wilks				6					33					14
24	(United Kingdom) Andrew Jordan				7								21		13
25	(Norway) Henning Solberg						33		13		14		15		12
26	(Sweden) Eric Färén						10								10
27	(France) Gaëtan Sérazin									12			17		7
28	(Sweden) Edward Sandström		13												4
29	(Portugal) Mário Barbosa	14													3
=	(France) Jérôme Grosset-Janin									14					3
=	(Norway) Alexander Hvaal						22		16			15			3
=	(Canada) Patrick Carpentier							14							3
33	(Sweden) Stig-Olov Walfridson						15								2
34	(Finland) Kristian Sohlberg											16			1
=	(Norway) Thomas Bryntesson													16	1
=	(Canada) Louis-Philippe Dumoulin							16							1
=	(Germany) Timo Scheider										16				1
=	(Norway) Ole Kristian Nøttveit			16			28								1
=	(France) Guerlain Chicherit												16		1
41	(Germany) René Münnich	20	18	19	26	12	27	19	21	34		12	20	18	−2
Pos.	Driver	POR (Portugal)	HOC (Germany)	BEL (Belgium)	GBR (United Kingdom)	GER (Germany)	SWE (Sweden)	CAN (Canada)	NOR (Norway)	FRA (France)	BAR (Spain)	TUR (Turkey)	ITA (Italy)	ARG (Argentina)	Points

=== FIA World Rallycross Championship for Teams ===
Pos.	Team	No.	Drivers	Points
1	(Sweden) Team Peugeot-Hansen	17	(Sweden) Timmy Hansen	476
1	(Sweden) Team Peugeot-Hansen	21	(France) Davy Jeanney	476
2	(Sweden) Olsbergs MSE	13	(Norway) Andreas Bakkerud	399
2	(Sweden) Olsbergs MSE	15	(Latvia) Reinis Nitišs	399
3	(Sweden) SDRX	1	(Norway) Petter Solberg	336
3	(Sweden) SDRX	33	(United Kingdom) Liam Doran	336
4	Volkswagen Team Sweden	3	(Sweden) Johan Kristoffersson	291
4	Volkswagen Team Sweden	52	(Norway) Ole Christian Veiby	291
4	Volkswagen Team Sweden	99	(Norway) Tord Linnerud	291
5	(Sweden) EKS RX	5	(Sweden) Edward Sandström	258
5	(Sweden) EKS RX	10	(Sweden) Mattias Ekström	258
5	(Sweden) EKS RX	92	(Sweden) Anton Marklund	258
5	(Sweden) EKS RX	177	(United Kingdom) Andrew Jordan	258
6	(Sweden) Marklund Motorsport	34	(United States) Tanner Foust	236
6	(Sweden) Marklund Motorsport	45	(Sweden) Per-Gunnar Andersson	236
6	(Sweden) Marklund Motorsport	57	(Finland) Toomas Heikkinen	236
6	(Sweden) Marklund Motorsport	100	(Norway) Thomas Bryntesson	236
7	World RX Team Austria	7	(Austria) Manfred Stohl	100
7	World RX Team Austria	31	(Austria) Max Pucher	100
7	World RX Team Austria	70	(Austria) Christoph Brugger	100
7	World RX Team Austria	199	(Latvia) Jānis Baumanis	100
8	(Germany) All-Inkl.com Münnich Motorsport	24	(Norway) Tommy Rustad	31
8	(Germany) All-Inkl.com Münnich Motorsport	44	(Germany) Timo Scheider	31
8	(Germany) All-Inkl.com Münnich Motorsport	55	(Sweden) Alx Danielsson	31
8	(Germany) All-Inkl.com Münnich Motorsport	77	(Germany) René Münnich	31
8	(Germany) All-Inkl.com Münnich Motorsport	110	(Italy) Gianni Morbidelli	31
