= 2015 World RX of Turkey =

Rallycross event

- Round 11 of 13 in the 2015 FIA World Rallycross Championship
- Date: 3–4 October 2015
- Location: Tuzla, Istanbul
- Venue: Istanbul Park

Results
Heat winners
- Heat 1: (Sweden) Timmy Hansen; Team Peugeot-Hansen
- Heat 2: (Sweden) Mattias Ekström; EKS RX
- Heat 3: (Sweden) Mattias Ekström; EKS RX
- Heat 4: (Sweden) Mattias Ekström; EKS RX
Semi-final winners
- Semi-final 1: (Norway) Andreas Bakkerud; Olsbergs MSE
- Semi-final 2: (Sweden) Timmy Hansen; Team Peugeot-Hansen
Final
- First: (Sweden) Timmy Hansen; Team Peugeot-Hansen
- Second: (Norway) Andreas Bakkerud; Olsbergs MSE
- Third: Johan Kristoffersson; Volkswagen Team Sweden

World RX layout of Istanbul Park

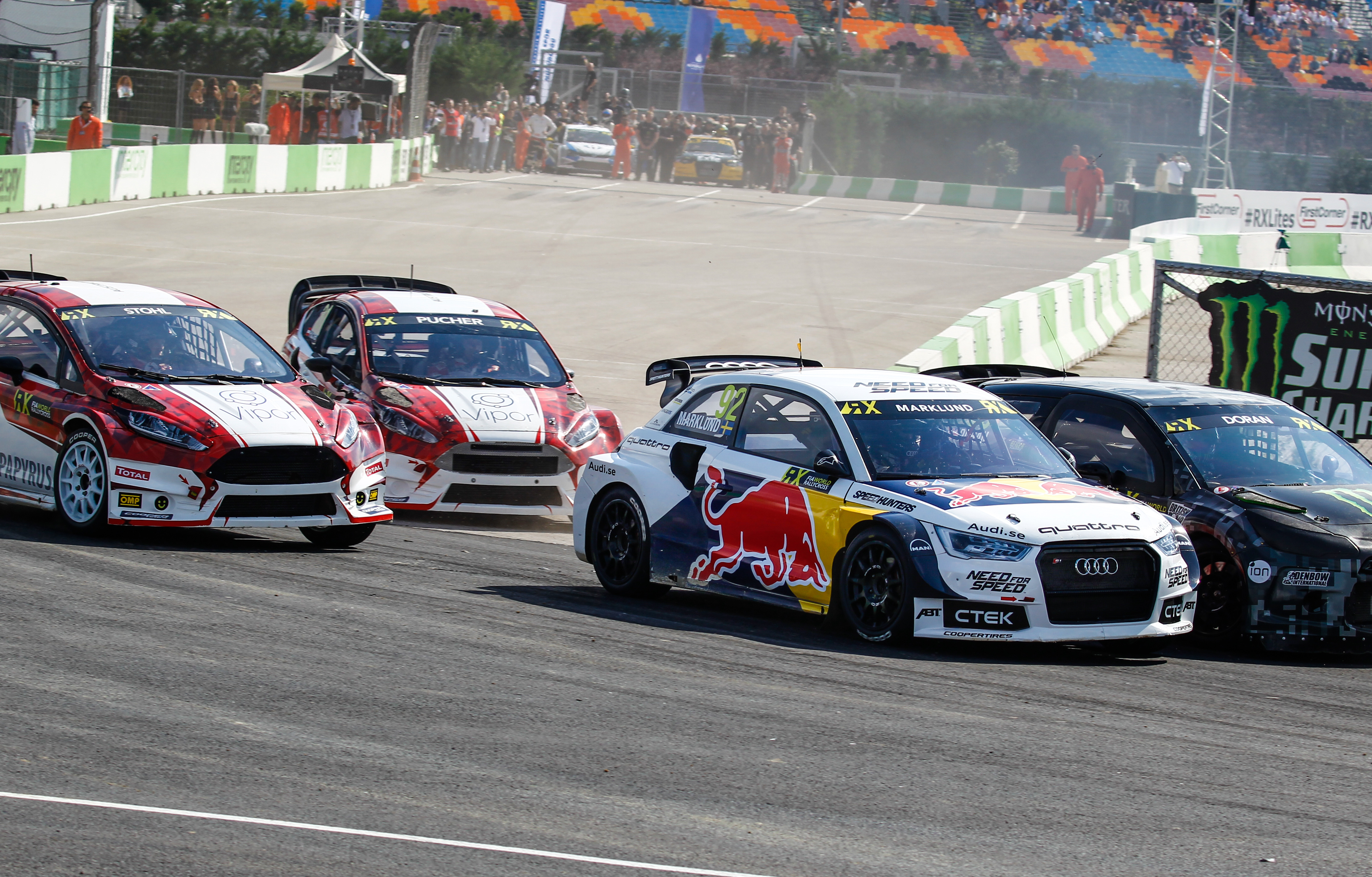
Liam Doran, Anton Marklund, Manfred Stohl and Max Pucher

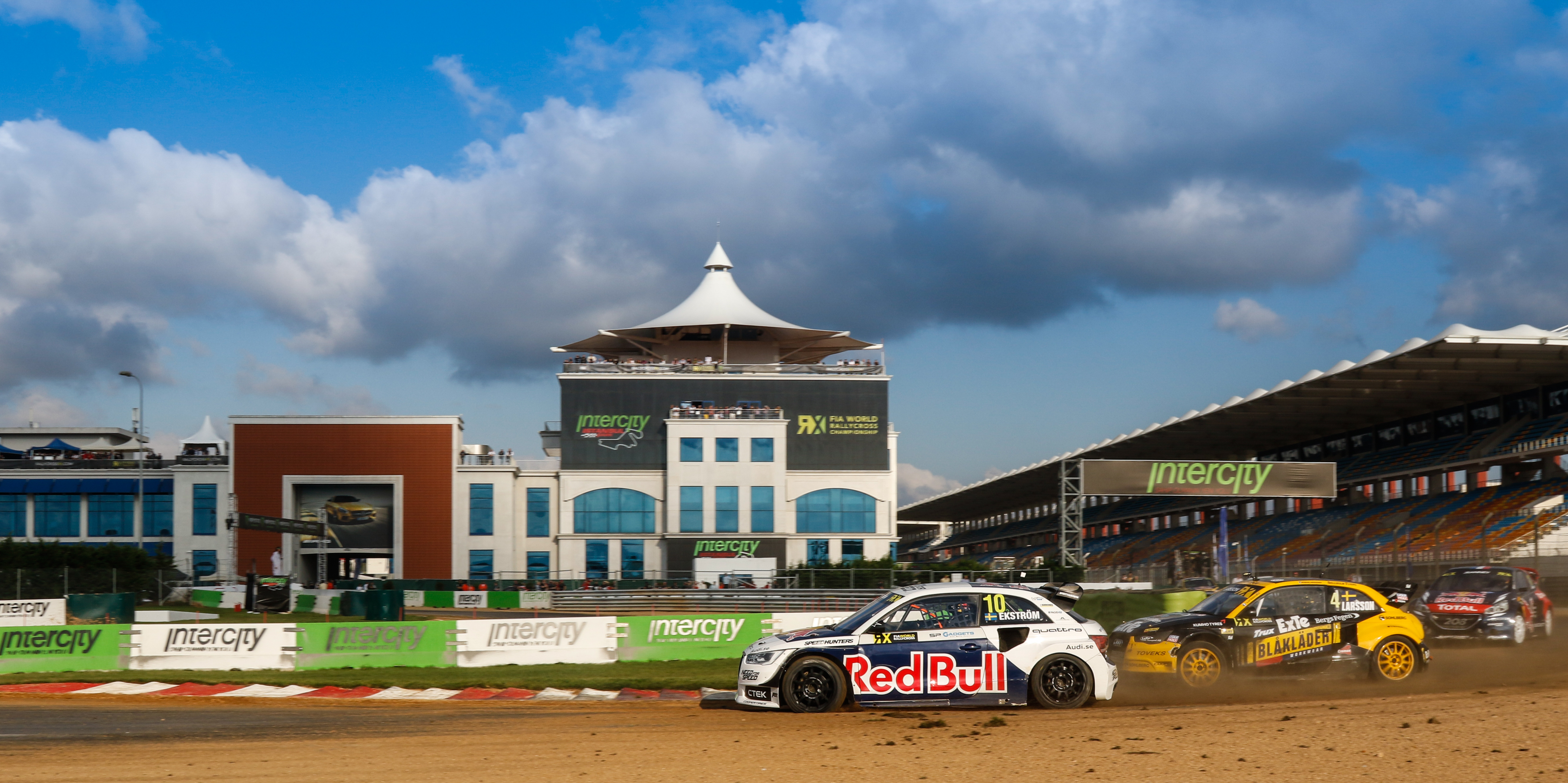
Mattias Ekström leads Robin Larsson and Davy Jeanney

The 2015 World RX of Turkey was the eleventh round of the second season of the FIA World Rallycross Championship. The event was held at the Istanbul Park circuit in Tuzla, Istanbul.

== Heats ==
| Pos. | No. | Driver | Team | Car | H1 | H2 | H3 | H4 | Pts |
|---|---|---|---|---|---|---|---|---|---|
| 1 | 10 | (Sweden) Mattias Ekström | EKS RX | Audi S1 | 6th | 1st | 1st | 1st | 16 |
| 2 | 21 | (Sweden) Timmy Hansen | Team Peugeot-Hansen | Peugeot 208 | 1st | 2nd | 3rd | 6th | 15 |
| 3 | 13 | (Norway) Andreas Bakkerud | Olsbergs MSE | Ford Fiesta ST | 4th | 5th | 2nd | 3rd | 14 |
| 4 | 15 | (Latvia) Reinis Nitišs | Olsbergs MSE | Ford Fiesta ST | 2nd | 3rd | 6th | 4th | 13 |
| 5 | 1 | (Norway) Petter Solberg | SDRX | Citroën DS3 | 3rd | 4th | 10th | 2nd | 12 |
| 6 | 3 | (Sweden) Johan Kristoffersson | Volkswagen Team Sweden | Volkswagen Polo | 5th | 6th | 7th | 10th | 11 |
| 7 | 42 | (Russia) Timur Timerzyanov | Namus OMSE | Ford Fiesta ST | 7th | 14th | 8th | 8th | 10 |
| 8 | 4 | (Sweden) Robin Larsson | Larsson Jernberg Racing Team | Audi A1 | 8th | 7th | 18th | 11th | 9 |
| 9 | 92 | (Sweden) Anton Marklund | EKS RX | Audi S1 | 13th | 11th | 4th | 20th | 8 |
| 10 | 17 | (France) Davy Jeanney | Team Peugeot-Hansen | Peugeot 208 | 9th | 9th | 20th | 9th | 7 |
| 11 | 99 | (Norway) Tord Linnerud | Volkswagen Team Sweden | Volkswagen Polo | 11th | 8th | 15th | 18th | 6 |
| 12 | 77 | (Germany) René Münnich | All-Inkl.com Münnich Motorsport | Audi S3 | 17th | 16th | 9th | 12th | 5 |
| 13 | 7 | (Austria) Manfred Stohl | World RX Team Austria | Ford Fiesta | 20th | 19th | 11th | 5th | 4 |
| 14 | 57 | (Finland) Toomas Heikkinen | Marklund Motorsport | Volkswagen Polo | 10th | 10th | 21st | 13th | 3 |
| 15 | 28 | (Norway) Alexander Hvaal | JC Raceteknik | Citroën DS3 | 14th | 15th | 13th | 14th | 2 |
| 16 | 146 | (Finland) Kristian Sohlberg | Albatec Racing | Peugeot 208 | 16th | 20th | 12th | 16th | 1 |
| 17 | 199 | (Latvia) Jānis Baumanis | Hansen Talent Development | Peugeot 208 | 12th | 12th | 19th | 21st | |
| 18 | 31 | (Austria) Max Pucher | World RX Team Austria | Ford Fiesta | 18th | 18th | 16th | 15th | |
| 19 | 55 | (Sweden) Alx Danielsson | All-Inkl.com Münnich Motorsport | Audi S3 | 15th | 21st | 14th | 17th | |
| 20 | 45 | (Sweden) Per-Gunnar Andersson | Marklund Motorsport | Volkswagen Polo | 19th | 13th | 17th | 19th | |
| 21 | 33 | (United Kingdom) Liam Doran | SDRX | Citroën DS3 | 21st | 17th | 5th | 7th | |

== Semi-finals ==
=== Semi-final 1 ===
| Pos. | No. | Driver | Team | Time | Pts |
|---|---|---|---|---|---|
| 1 | 13 | (Norway) Andreas Bakkerud | Olsbergs MSE | 6:04.049 | 6 |
| 2 | 10 | (Sweden) Mattias Ekström | EKS RX | +1.088 | 5 |
| 3 | 92 | (Sweden) Anton Marklund | EKS RX | +2.879 | 4 |
| 4 | 42 | (Russia) Timur Timerzyanov | Olsbergs MSE | +3.657 | 3 |
| 5 | 99 | (Norway) Tord Linnerud | Volkswagen Team Sweden | +10.826 | 2 |
| 6 | 1 | (Norway) Petter Solberg | SDRX | +35.356 | 1 |

=== Semi-final 2 ===
| Pos. | No. | Driver | Team | Time | Pts |
|---|---|---|---|---|---|
| 1 | 21 | (Sweden) Timmy Hansen | Team Peugeot-Hansen | 6:05.518 | 6 |
| 2 | 17 | (France) Davy Jeanney | Team Peugeot-Hansen | +0.587 | 5 |
| 3 | 3 | (Sweden) Johan Kristoffersson | Volkswagen Team Sweden | +1.700 | 4 |
| 4 | 15 | (Latvia) Reinis Nitišs | Olsbergs MSE | +2.623 | 3 |
| 5 | 77 | (Germany) René Münnich | All-Inkl.com Münnich Motorsport | +6.872 | 2 |
| 6 | 4 | (Sweden) Robin Larsson | Larsson Jernberg Racing Team | +9.376 | 1 |

== Final ==
| Pos. | No. | Driver | Team | Time | Pts |
|---|---|---|---|---|---|
| 1 | 21 | (Sweden) Timmy Hansen | Team Peugeot-Hansen | 6:02.470 | 8 |
| 2 | 13 | (Norway) Andreas Bakkerud | Olsbergs MSE | +0.277 | 5 |
| 3 | 3 | (Sweden) Johan Kristoffersson | Volkswagen Team Sweden | +2.470 | 4 |
| 4 | 10 | (Sweden) Mattias Ekström | EKS RX | +9.562 | 3 |
| 5 | 17 | (France) Davy Jeanney | Team Peugeot-Hansen | +9.987 | 2 |
| 6 | 92 | (Sweden) Anton Marklund | EKS RX | DNF | 1 |

== Championship standings after the event ==
| Pos. | Driver | Points |
|---|---|---|
| 1 | (Norway) Petter Solberg | 256 |
| 2 | (Sweden) Timmy Hansen | 237 |
| 3 | (Sweden) Johan Kristoffersson | 201 |
| 4 | (Norway) Andreas Bakkerud | 188 |
| 5 | (France) Davy Jeanney | 180 |

| Previous race: 2015 World RX of Barcelona | FIA World Rallycross Championship; 2015 season | Next race: 2015 World RX of Italy |
| Previous race: 2014 World RX of Turkey | World RX of Turkey | Next race: 2024 World RX of Turkey |
