= Kenneth Hansen (rallycross) =

Swedish rallycross driver

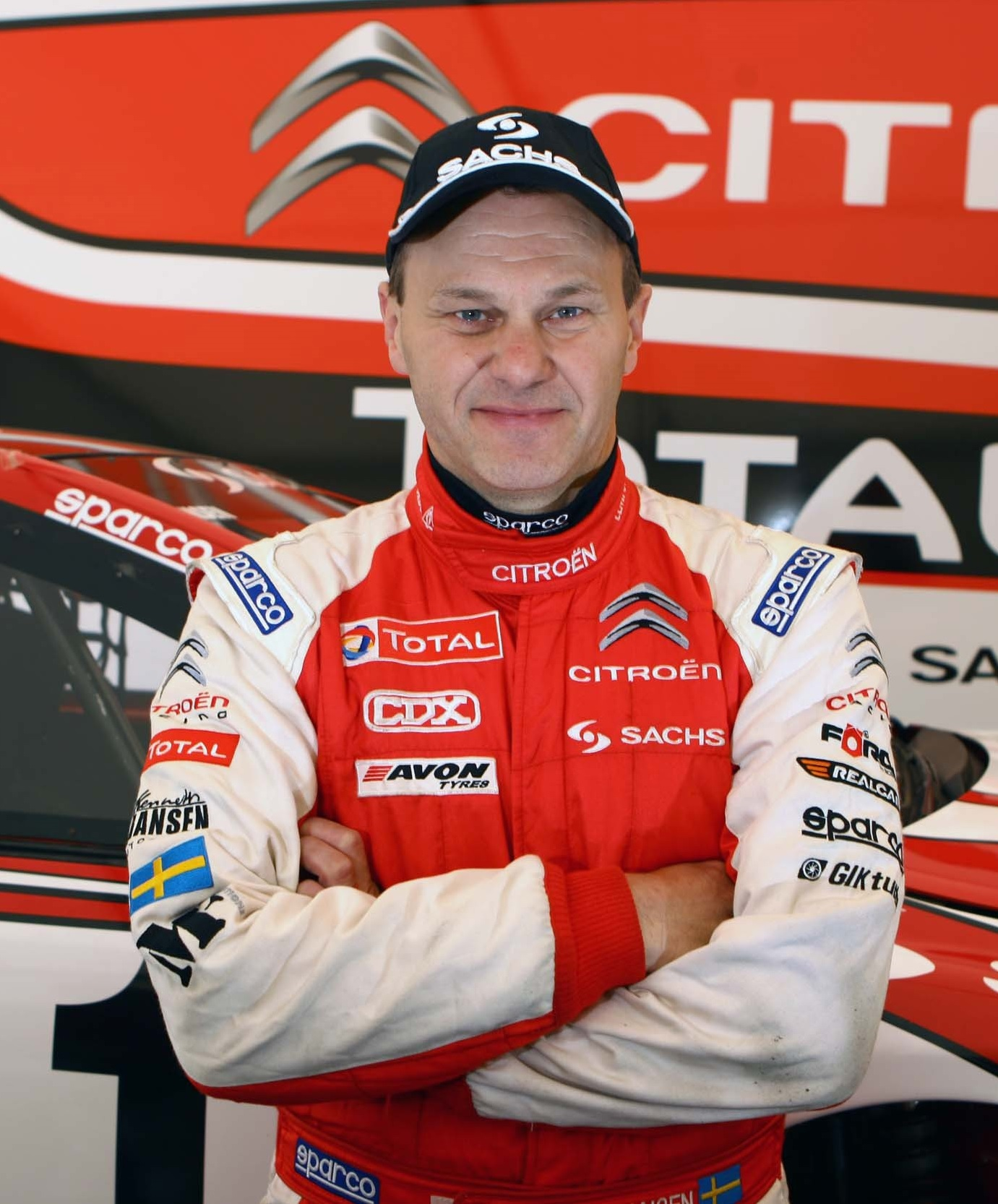
- Kenneth Hansen in 2009
- Nationality: (Sweden) Swedish
- Born: Svend Kenneth Hansen; 29 September 1960 (age 66) Götene, Sweden
- Relatives: Kevin Hansen (son); Timmy Hansen (son)

FIA ERX Supercar Championship
- Years active: 2011
- Former teams: Hansen Motorsport
- Starts: 2
- Wins: 0
- Podiums: 2
- Best finish: 15th in 2011

FIA ERX Division 1 (1997–2010) Championship
- Years active: 1997–2010
- Former teams: Hansen Motorsport
- Starts: 140
- Championships: 8 (1998, 2000, 2001, 2002, 2003, 2004, 2005, 2008)
- Wins: 41
- Podiums: 95

FIA ERX Division 2 (1982–1996) Championship
- Years active: 1993–1996
- Former teams: Hansen Motorsport
- Starts: 44
- Championships: 2 (1994, 1996)
- Wins: 16
- Podiums: 35

FIA ERX Division 1 (1982–1996) Championship
- Years active: 1987–1992
- Former teams: Hansen Motorsport
- Starts: 63
- Championships: 4 (1989, 1990, 1991, 1992)
- Wins: 16
- Podiums: 38

Previous series
- National Swedish Karting series Swedish Rallycross Championship

Svend Kenneth Hansen (born 29 September 1960) is a Swedish former rallycross driver. His late father, Svend Hansen, can be regarded as the inventor of the so-called Joker Lap for rallycross. Hansen has been part of the European rallycross elite since the late 1980s and has won an FIA European Championships for Rallycross Drivers title no less than 14 times up until the year 2008. He holds most of the records for rallycross, including the amount (249) of attended European rounds.

== Racing career ==
Hansen began his racing career with karting in 1976 and via folkrace and rallying made his way to national rallycross in 1983. After a few years successful national racing, crowned by his first Swedish Rallycross Championship in 1986 when he drove a Volvo Amazon, he entered international rallycross in 1987 with an ex-Lars Nyström Volvo 240 Turbo. After changing to a 500+bhp Ford Sierra RS500 Cosworth in 1989, Hansen instantly became the driver to beat of the former Division 1 (2WD Group A cars), claiming the FIA European titles of four consecutive years here. However, in his first year he was, for the first and only time during his ERC career, excluded from an event, after it was proven that he had been using illegal 103 octane race-fuel during the Norwegian 1989 European round.

From 1993 and onwards, Hansen competed exclusively with Citroën cars. At the end of the 2010 season, Hansen wound down his own racing activities to be able to develop his team Hansen Motorsport. In March 2013, Hansen was appointed to the FIA's then-newly created Driver's Commission as one of 12 driver representatives.

== Personal life ==
Hansen still lives in his birth town of Götene with his wife Susann Hansen (née Bergvall); herself a successful rallycross driver and winner of the 1994 European Cup for Drivers of Group N cars up to 1400cc. Together they have two sons; Kevin, born in 1998, and Timmy, born in 1992. Both sons have followed their parents footsteps to race in rallycross for Hansen Motorsport.

== Racing record ==
=== Complete FIA European Rallycross Championship results ===
==== Division 1 ====
Year	Entrant	Car	1	2	3	4	5	6	7	8	9	10	11	ERX	Points
1987	Kenneth Hansen	Volvo 240 Turbo	AUT; 7	SWE (14)	FIN; 3	ESP; 7	FRA (NC)	IRE (7)	BEL; 3	NED; 5	NOR (7)	GBR; 2	GER; 3	5th	94
1988	Kenneth Hansen	Volvo 240 Turbo	ESP (9)	DEN; 6	SWE (7)	FIN; 6	IRE (11)	FRA; 3	BEL; 3	NED (15)	NOR; 6	GBR; 3	GER; 4	6th	91
1989	Kenneth Hansen	Ford Sierra RS500 Cosworth	ESP; DNS	AUT; 1	SWE; 2	FIN (17)	IRE; 2	FRA; 1	BEL; 2	NED; 2	NOR (DSQ)	GBR; 3	GER (6)	1st	123
1990	Hansen Motorsport	Ford Sierra RS500 Cosworth	AUT; 4	SWE (10)	FIN; 1	IRE; 1	FRA (6)	BEL (6)	NED; 1	NOR; 1	GER; 4	GBR; 3		1st	121
1991	Hansen Motorsport	Ford Sierra RS500 Cosworth	POR; 1	AUT (2)	FIN (2)	FRA; 1	IRE; 1	SWE; 1	BEL; 1	NED; 1	NOR; 1	GBR (2)	GER (6)	1st	140
1992	Hansen Motorsport	Ford Sierra RS500 Cosworth	GBR; 2	AUT; DNS	POR; 2	FIN; 1	SWE (3)	FRA (4)	IRE; 1	BEL; 2	NED; 2	NOR; 1	GER (3)	1st	128

==== Division 2 ====
Year	Entrant	Car	1	2	3	4	5	6	7	8	9	10	11	12	ERX	Points
1993	Hansen Motorsport	Citroën ZX 16V Turbo	AUT; 1	POR; 2	FRA (6)	IRE; 4	SWE; 1	FIN (6)	BEL; 2	NED; 1	NOR; 1	GER (6)			2nd	127
1994	Hansen Motorsport	Citroën ZX 16V Turbo	AUT; 1	POR; 1	FRA (4)	IRE; 2	GBR; 2	SWE; 1	FIN (2)	BEL; 1	NED (3)	NOR; 1	GER (2)		1st	134
1995	Hansen Motorsport	Citroën ZX 16V Turbo	AUT; 3	POR; 2	FRA (3)	SWE; 1	GBR; 1	IRE; 1	BEL; 2	NED; 2	NOR (5)	FIN (4)	CZE (6)	GER; 1	2nd	146
1996	Hansen Motorsport	Citroën ZX 16V Turbo	AUT (3)	POR (6)	FRA; 2	SWE; 2	IRE (3)	GBR; 1	BEL; 1	NED; 2	NOR; 2	CZE (2)	GER; 1		1st	128

==== Division 1^{*} ====
Year	Entrant	Car	1	2	3	4	5	6	7	8	9	10	11	ERX	Points
1997	Hansen Motorsport	Citroën ZX 16V Turbo	AUT; 4	FRA; 4	POR; 2	GBR (4)	SWE; 2	FIN; 2	BEL; 1	NOR; 2	CZE; 5	GER; 6		2nd	114
1998	Hansen Motorsport	Citroën Xsara VTS T16	AUT; 1	POR; 2	FRA (5)	SWE (6)	GBR; 2	FIN; 2	BEL; 1	NOR; 1	GER; 2	CZE (2)		1st	128
1999	Hansen Motorsport	Citroën Xsara VTS T16	CZE; 4	FRA; 2	POR; 1	SWE (10)	FIN; 5	BEL; 1	NED; 3	NOR (6)	GER; 1			2nd	117
2000	Hansen Motorsport	Citroën Xsara WRC	POR (6)	FRA; 1	CZE; 2	SWE; 1	BEL (6)	NED; 1	NOR; 2	POL; 2	GER; 1			1st	131
2001	Hansen Motorsport	Citroën Xsara WRC	FRA; 1	POR; 1	AUT; 1	CZE (5)	SWE (1)	BEL; 3	NED (4)	NOR; 1	POL (12)	GER; 2		1st	112
2002	Hansen Motorsport	Citroën Xsara WRC	POR; 1	FRA; 1	AUT (2)	CZE; 1	SWE; 1	BEL; 3	NED; 2	NOR; 1	POL; 1	GER (5)		1st	152
2003	Hansen Motorsport	Citroën Xsara T16	POR; 1	FRA; 2	AUT; 1	CZE (6)	SWE; 1	BEL; 1	NED; 1	NOR; 2	POL (8)	GER; 1		1st	154
2004	Hansen Motorsport	Citroën Xsara T16	POR; 3	FRA (6)	CZE; 2	AUT; 1	NOR; 1	SWE; 2	BEL; 1	NED; 3	POL (6)	GER; 1		1st	144
2005	Hansen Motorsport	Citroën Xsara T16	FRA; 1	POR; 1	AUT; 1	CZE (10)	NOR; 2	SWE (6)	BEL; 3	NED; 3	POL; 3	GER; 2		1st	139
2006	Hansen Motorsport	Citroën C4 T16	POR; 1	FRA; 3	CZE; 3	AUT; 1	SWE; 2	HUN (5)	BEL; 4	NED; 6	NOR; 2	POL; 6	GER (7)	2nd	139
2007	Hansen Motorsport	Citroën C4 T16	POR; 3	FRA; 2	HUN; 2	AUT (7)	SWE; 4	NOR; 5	BEL; 4	NED; 1	POL; 2	CZE (18)		2nd	124
2008	Hansen Motorsport	Citroën C4 T16	POR; 2	FRA; 3	HUN; 1	AUT (8)	NOR; 2	SWE; 2	BEL; 3	NED; 2	CZE; 1	POL; 4	GER (7)	1st	151
2009	Hansen Motorsport	Citroën C4 T16	GBR; 1	POR (5)	FRA; 5	HUN; 4	AUT; 2	SWE; 5	BEL; 3	GER (11)	POL; 3	CZE; 11		3rd	110
2010	Hansen Motorsport	Citroën C4 T16	POR; 3	FRA (6)	GBR; 2	HUN; 3	SWE; 2	FIN; 4	BEL (7)	GER; 2	POL; 3	CZE; 3		2nd	124

^{*} Division 2 was rebranded as Division 1 in 1997.

==== Supercar ====
Year	Entrant	Car	1	2	3	4	5	6	7	8	9	10	ERX	Points
2011	Hansen Motorsport	Citroën DS3 T16	GBR	POR	FRA	NOR	SWE; 2	BEL	NED	AUT	POL	CZE; 2	15th	34

Sporting positions
Preceded by Bjørn Skogstad	European Rallycross Division 1 Champion; 1989, 1990, 1991, 1992	Succeeded by Ludvig Hunsbedt
Preceded by Jean-Luc Pailler	European Rallycross Division 2* Champion; 1994; *Division 2 was rebranded as Division 1 in 1997	Succeeded by Martin Schanche
Preceded by Martin Schanche	European Rallycross Division 2* Champion; 1996; *Division 2 was rebranded as Division 1 in 1997	Succeeded by Ludvig Hunsbedt
Preceded by Ludvig Hunsbedt	European Rallycross Division 1 Champion; 1998	Succeeded by Per Eklund
Preceded by Per Eklund	European Rallycross Division 1 Champion; 2000, 2001, 2002, 2003, 2004, 2005	Succeeded by Lars Larsson
Preceded by Lars Larsson	European Rallycross Division 1 Champion; 2008	Succeeded by Sverre Isachsen
