= 2015 World RX of Argentina =

Rallycross event held in Argentina

- Round 13 of 13 in the 2015 FIA World Rallycross Championship
- Date: 28–29 November 2015
- Location: Rosario, Santa Fe
- Venue: Autódromo Municipal Juan Manuel Fangio

Results
Heat winners
- Heat 1: (Norway) Andreas Bakkerud; Olsbergs MSE
- Heat 2: (Sweden) Timmy Hansen; Team Peugeot-Hansen
- Heat 3: (Sweden) Timmy Hansen; Team Peugeot-Hansen
- Heat 4: cancelled
Semi-final winners
- Semi-final 1: (Sweden) Robin Larsson; Larsson Jernberg Racing Team
- Semi-final 2: (Sweden) Timmy Hansen; Team Peugeot-Hansen
Final
- First: (Sweden) Robin Larsson; Larsson Jernberg Racing Team
- Second: (Sweden) Mattias Ekström; EKS RX
- Third: (Norway) Petter Solberg; SDRX

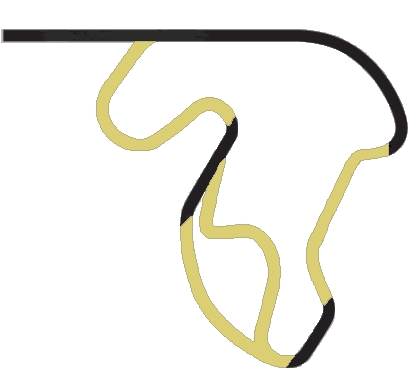
World RX layout of Autódromo Municipal Juan Manuel Fangio

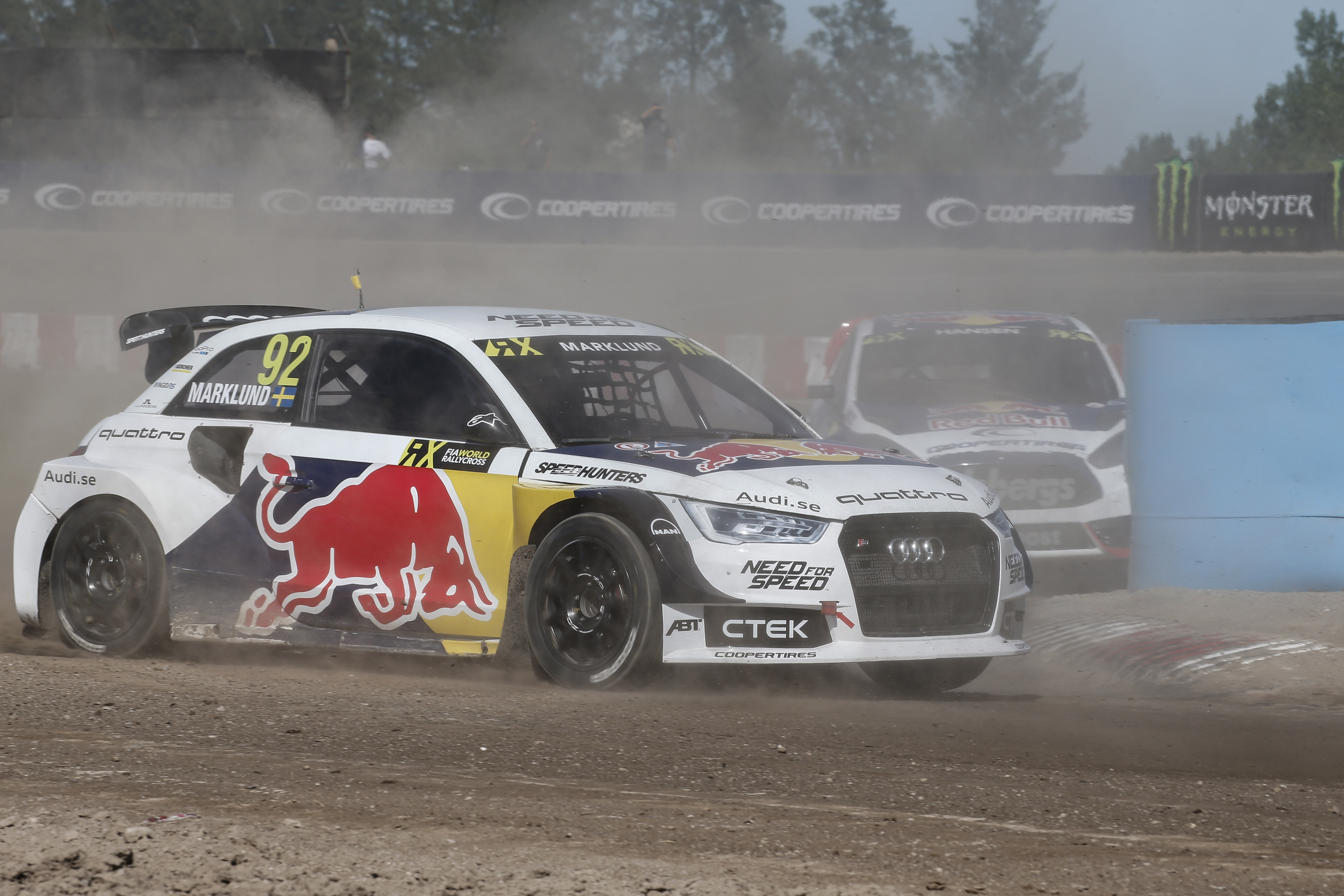
Anton Marklund and Kevin Hansen

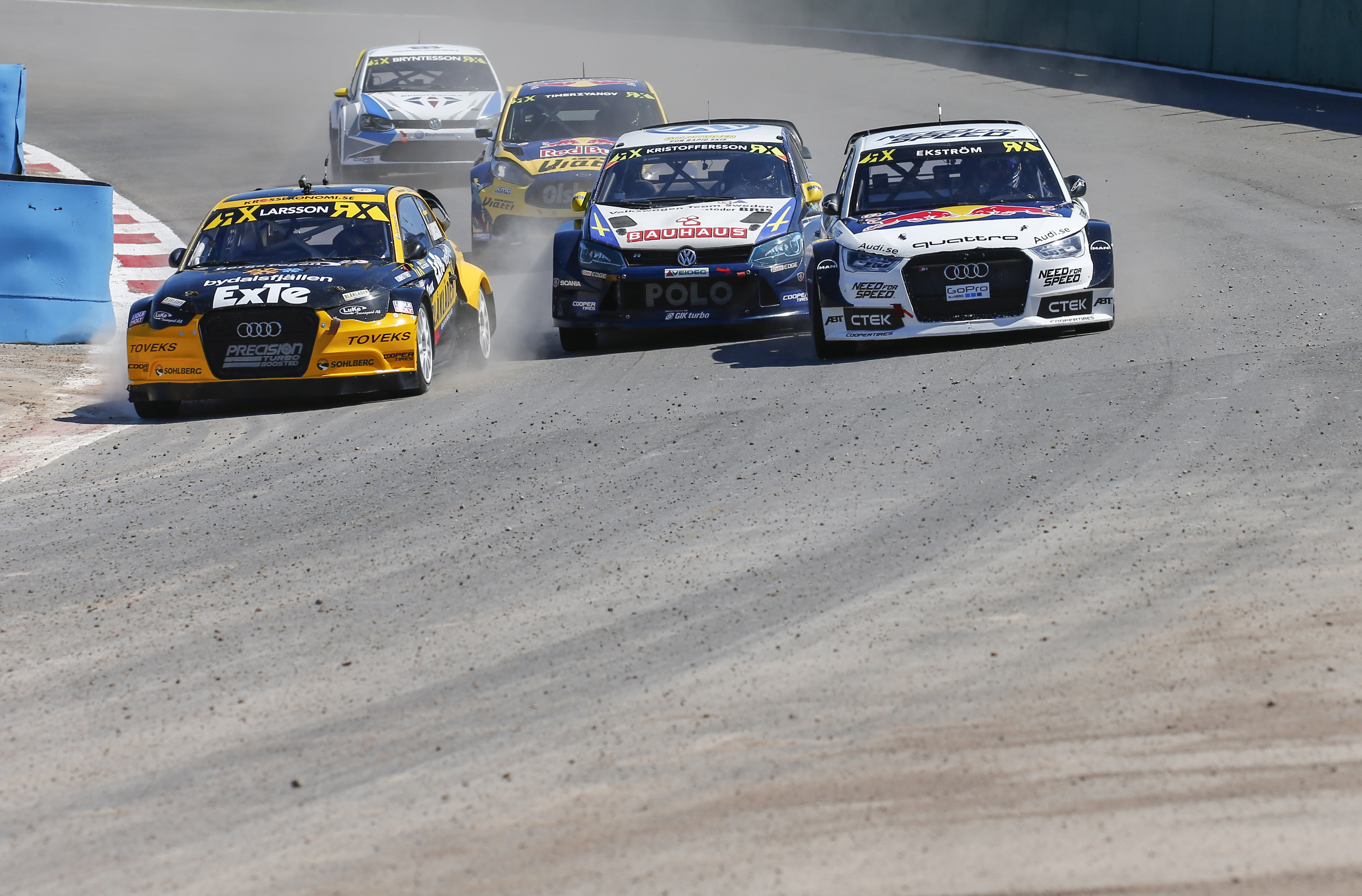
Event winner Larsson leads Ekström, Kristoffersson, Timerzyanov and Bryntesson

The 2015 World RX of Argentina was the final round of the second season of the FIA World Rallycross Championship. The event was held at the Autódromo Municipal Juan Manuel Fangio in Rosario, Santa Fe, over one day following the declaration of unsafe track conditions on the first scheduled day of competition. This led to the first World Championship event to be held over only three heats. Petter Solberg secured his second consecutive title having only needed to advance to the semi-finals to achieve it.

== Heats ==
Pos.	No.	Driver	Team	Car	H1	H2	H3	Pts
1	13	(Norway) Andreas Bakkerud	Olsbergs MSE	Ford Fiesta ST	1st	2nd	4th	16
2	21	(Sweden) Timmy Hansen	Team Peugeot-Hansen	Peugeot 208	13th	1st	1st	15
3	4	(Sweden) Robin Larsson	Larsson Jernberg Racing Team	Audi A1	3rd	3rd	9th	14
4	1	(Norway) Petter Solberg	SDRX	Citroën DS3	4th	12th	2nd	13
5	10	(Sweden) Mattias Ekström	EKS RX	Audi S1	8th	5th	11th	12
6	199	(Latvia) Jānis Baumanis	World RX Team Austria	Ford Fiesta	12th	8th	6th	11
7	98	(Sweden) Kevin Hansen	Olsbergs MSE	Ford Fiesta ST	9th	10th	7th	10
8	17	(France) Davy Jeanney	Team Peugeot-Hansen	Peugeot 208	2nd	9th	18th	9
9	52	(Norway) Ole Christian Veiby	Volkswagen Team Sweden	Volkswagen Polo	19th	6th	3rd	8
10	92	(Sweden) Anton Marklund	EKS RX	Audi S1	6th	7th	15th	7
11	57	(Finland) Toomas Heikkinen	Marklund Motorsport	Volkswagen Polo	14th	4th	12th	6
12	7	(Austria) Manfred Stohl	World RX Team Austria	Ford Fiesta	5th	18th	8th	5
13	3	(Sweden) Johan Kristoffersson	Volkswagen Team Sweden	Volkswagen Polo	10th	11th	13th	4
14	15	(Latvia) Reinis Nitišs	Olsbergs MSE	Ford Fiesta ST	7th	13th	17th	3
15	33	(United Kingdom) Liam Doran	SDRX	Citroën DS3	16th	17th	5th	2
16	100	(Norway) Thomas Bryntesson	Marklund Motorsport	Volkswagen Polo	15th	15th	10th	1
17	42	(Russia) Timur Timerzyanov	Namus OMSE	Ford Fiesta ST	11th	14th	16th	
18	77	(Germany) René Münnich	Münnich Motorsport	Audi S3	17th	16th	14th	
19	110	(Italy) Gianni Morbidelli	Münnich Motorsport	Audi S3	18th	19th	19th	

Note - Heat 4 was cancelled as a result of the one-day format.

== Semi-finals ==
=== Semi-final 1 ===
Pos.	No.	Driver	Team	Time	Pts
1	4	(Sweden) Robin Larsson	Larsson Jernberg Racing Team	3:57.133	6
2	10	(Sweden) Mattias Ekström	EKS RX	+3.277	5
3	98	(Sweden) Kevin Hansen	Olsbergs MSE	+4.865	4
4	57	(Finland) Toomas Heikkinen	Marklund Motorsport	+8.399	3
5	3	(Sweden) Johan Kristoffersson	Volkswagen Team Sweden	DNF	2
6	13	(Norway) Andreas Bakkerud	Olsbergs MSE	DNF	1

=== Semi-final 2 ===
Pos.	No.	Driver	Team	Time/Retired	Pts
1	21	(Sweden) Timmy Hansen	Team Peugeot-Hansen	4:03.510	6
2	1	(Norway) Petter Solberg	SDRX	+2.018	5
3	199	(Latvia) Jānis Baumanis	World RX Team Austria	+4.221	4
4	17	(France) Davy Jeanney	Team Peugeot-Hansen	+5.462	3
5	7	(Austria) Manfred Stohl	World RX Team Austria	+6.827	2
6	92	(Sweden) Anton Marklund	EKS RX	DNF	1

== Final ==
Pos.	No.	Driver	Team	Time/Retired	Pts
1	4	(Sweden) Robin Larsson	Larsson Jernberg Racing Team	4:16.346	8
2	10	(Sweden) Mattias Ekström	EKS RX	+0.453	5
3	1	(Norway) Petter Solberg	SDRX	+5.241	4
4	199	(Latvia) Jānis Baumanis	World RX Team Austria	+6.696	3
5	98	(Sweden) Kevin Hansen	Olsbergs MSE	DNF	2
6	21	(Sweden) Timmy Hansen	Team Peugeot-Hansen	DNF	1

== Championship standings after the event ==
Pos.	Driver	Points
WC	(Norway) Petter Solberg	301
2	(Sweden) Timmy Hansen	275
3	(Sweden) Johan Kristoffersson	234
4	(Norway) Andreas Bakkerud	232
5	(France) Davy Jeanney	201
5	(Sweden) Mattias Ekström	201

Previous race: 2015 World RX of Italy	FIA World Rallycross Championship; 2015 season	Next race: 2016 World RX of Portugal
Previous race: 2014 World RX of Argentina	World RX of Argentina	Next race: 2016 World RX of Argentina
