= Timmy Hansen =

Swedish racing driver

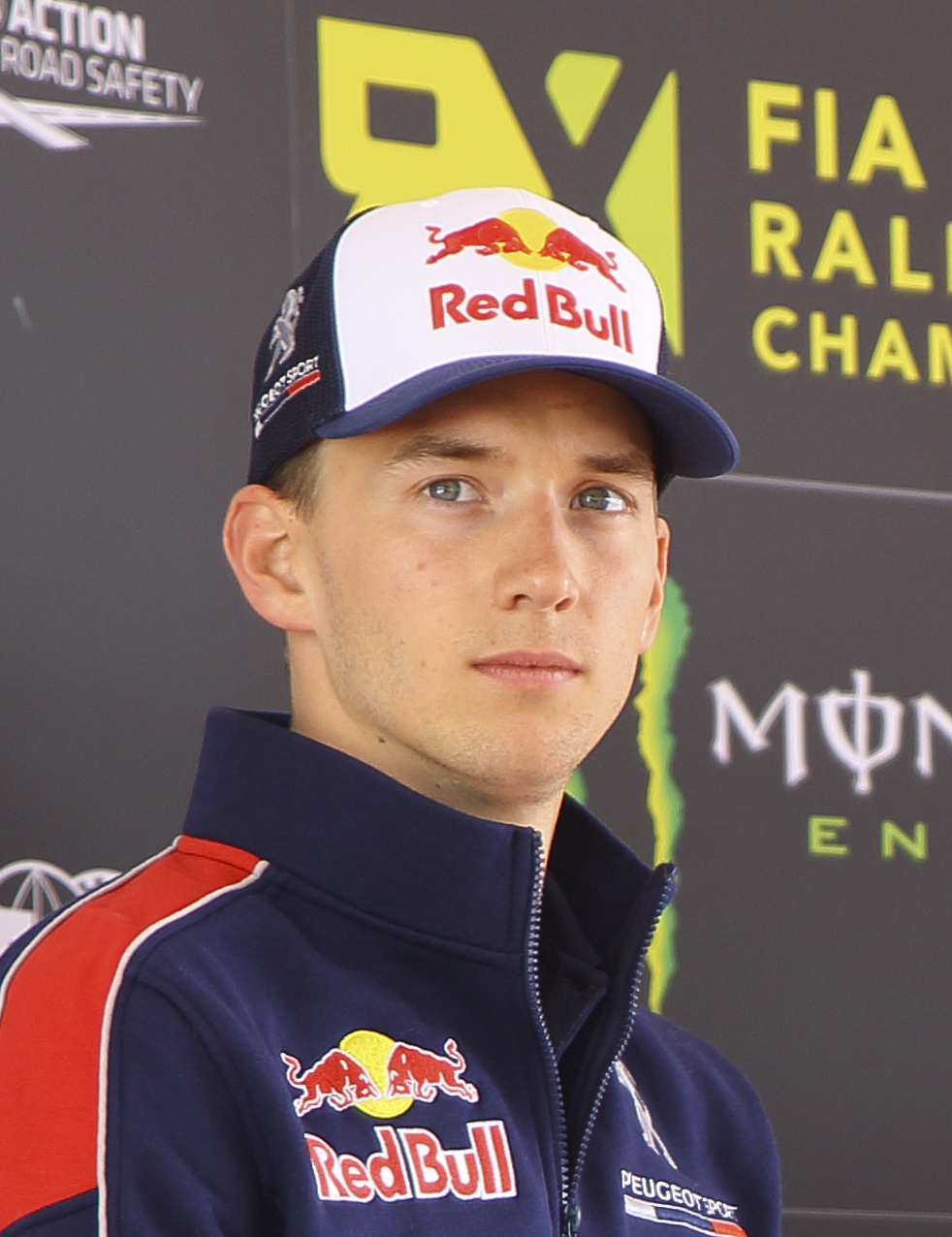
- Hansen in 2018
- Nationality: (Sweden) Swedish
- Born: Kenneth Timmy Hansen; 21 May 1992 (age 34) Lidköping, Sweden
- Relatives: Kenneth Hansen (father); Kevin Hansen (brother)

FIA World Rallycross Championship career
- Debut season: 2014
- Current team: Hansen World RX Team
- Categorisation: FIA Platinum
- Car number: 21
- Former teams: Team Peugeot-Hansen, Team Peugeot Total
- Starts: 118
- Wins: 14
- Podiums: 51
- Best finish: 1st in 2019
- Finished last season: 5th

FIA ERX Supercar Championship
- Years active: 2012-2013
- Former teams: Citroën Hansen Motorsport
- Starts: 10
- Wins: 1
- Podiums: 4
- Best finish: 3rd in 2013
Medal record
Nitro World Games
Representing Sweden
Gold medal – first place	2018 Erda	Nitro Rallycross

Kenneth Timmy Hansen (born 21 May 1992) is a Swedish rallycross driver and former racing driver. He won the 2019 FIA World Rallycross Championship in the FIA World Rallycross Championship, driving for Team Peugeot-Hansen. His father is the 14-time European Rallycross Champion Kenneth Hansen, his mother the 1994 ERA European Cup (Group N up to 1400cc) winner Susann Hansen (née Bergvall), and his brother rallycross driver Kevin Hansen.

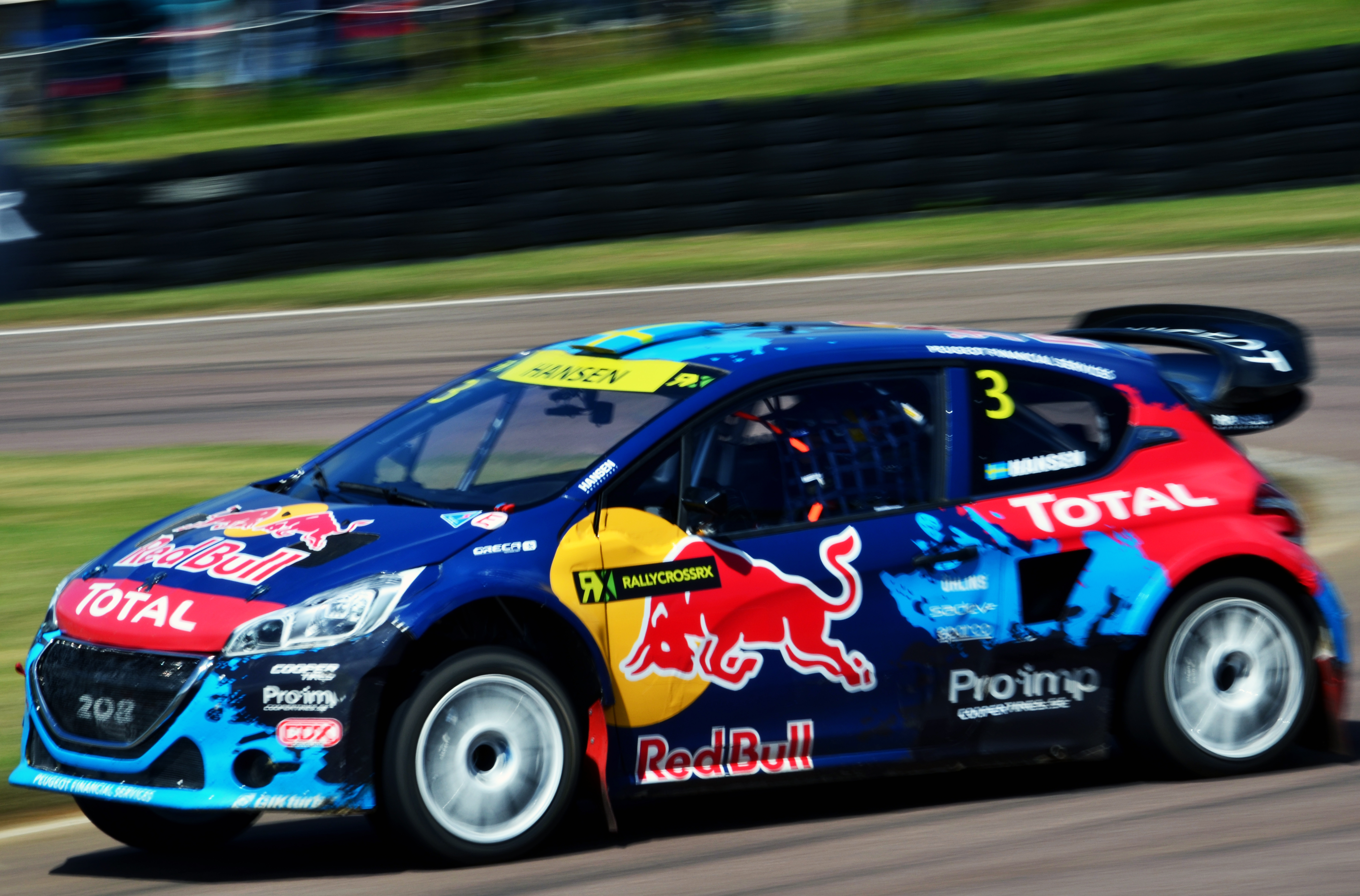
Hansen in action during the 2014 World RX of Great Britain.

== Career start ==
Hansen has won the Swedish Karting Championship in 2008, and has won races in Formula BMW, Formula Renault 2.0 Alps and the Eurocup Formula Renault 2.0. In April 2011, he drove his first ever rallycross event at Dreux in France with a by MTechnologies lent Citroën Xsara Supercar of Marc Laboulle, that was previously used by Davy Jeanney to claim the French 2010 championship title. In 2012, his father offered him a one-off drive in the FIA European Rallycross Championship, the Finnish ERX round at Kouvola saw him driving the 2012 X Games winning car of Sébastien Loeb to an impressive fifth place overall. After he gave up single seater racing, the younger Hansen started his rallycross career by taking part in the entire 2013 Euro RX series, after nine rounds finishing in third place overall.

== World RX ==
For 2014, Hansen was partnered by former European Rallycross Championship title winner Timur Timerzyanov at his father's team to enter the inaugural season of World RX.

Hansen took one win and a further three podium finishes in the 2014 FIA World Rallycross Championship season and would finish the year with 199 points and fourth place in the championship standings while Timerzyanov finished in seventh with one podium.

For the 2015 season, it was announced that he would be driving alongside Davy Jeanney for the Team Peugeot-Hansen team in their new Peugeot 208 WRX. Hansen took three wins on his way to second in the championship behind Petter Solberg.

For 2016, Hansen partnered with nine-time WRC champion Sébastien Loeb at Hansen Motorsport. Jeanney moved to the team's second outfit Peugeot Hansen Academy, alongside Timmy's younger brother Kevin. He won a race and collected six podiums, which put him sixth in the overall standings.

== Racing record ==
=== Circuit racing career summary ===
Season	Series	Team	Races	Wins	Poles	F/Laps	Podiums	Points	Position
2009	Formula BMW Europe	Mücke Motorsport	16	0	0	0	0	79	13th
2010	Formula BMW Europe	Mücke Motorsport	16	1	1	1	4	240	**3rd**
2010	Formula Abarth	RP Motorsport	2	0	0	1	0	3	25th
2011	Eurocup Formula Renault 2.0	Interwetten.com Racing Junior Team	14	1	1	1	2	82	7th
2011	Formula Renault 2.0 Alps	Interwetten.com Racing Junior Team	4	1	2	1	2	88	16th
2012	Eurocup Formula Renault 2.0	Interwetten.com Racing	7	0	0	0	0	0	31st
2012	Porsche Carrera Cup Scandinavia		2	0	0	0	1	46	13th
2026	Porsche Carrera Cup Scandinavia	Porsche Experience Racing	4	0	0	0	0	0	NC†

=== Complete Formula Renault 2.0 Alps Series results ===
(key) (Races in bold indicate pole position; races in italics indicate fastest lap)

Year	Team	1	2	3	4	5	6	7	8	9	10	11	12	13	14	Pos	Points
2011	Interwetten.com Racing Junior Team	MNZ; 1	MNZ; 2	IMO; 1	IMO; 2	PAU; 1	PAU; 2	RBR; 1; 4	RBR; 2; 1	HUN; 1	HUN; 2	LEC; 1	LEC; 2	**SPA**; **1**; 16	**SPA**; **2**; 2	16th	88

=== Complete Eurocup Formula Renault 2.0 results ===
(key) (Races in bold indicate pole position; races in italics indicate fastest lap)

Year	Entrant	1	2	3	4	5	6	7	8	9	10	11	12	13	14	DC	Points
2011	Interwetten.com Racing Junior Team	ALC; 1 Ret	ALC; 2; 4	SPA; 1; 36	SPA; 2; 16	NÜR; 1; 6	NÜR; 2; 3	HUN; 1; 7	**HUN**; **2**; 1	SIL; 1; 6	SIL; 2; 11	LEC; 1; 8	LEC; 2 DSQ	CAT; 1; 17	CAT; 2; 8	7th	82
2012	Interwetten.com Racing Junior Team	ALC; 1; 13	ALC; 2; 13	SPA; 1; 11	SPA; 2; 17	NÜR; 1 Ret	NÜR; 2 DNS	MSC; 1; 20	MSC; 2; 15	HUN; 1	HUN; 2	LEC; 1	LEC; 2	CAT; 1	CAT; 2	31st	0

=== Complete FIA European Rallycross Championship results ===
(key)

==== Supercar ====
Year	Entrant	Car	1	2	3	4	5	6	7	8	9	10	ERX	Points
2012	Citroën Hansen Motorsport	Citroën DS3	GBR	FRA	AUT	HUN	NOR	SWE	BEL	NED	FIN; 5	GER	24th	12
2013	Citroën Hansen Motorsport	Citroën DS3	GBR; 3	POR; 11	HUN; 1	FIN; 3	NOR; 9	SWE; 3	FRA; 8	AUT; 10	GER; 13		**3rd**	**145**

=== Complete FIA World Rallycross Championship results ===
(key)

==== Supercar/RX1/RX1e ====
Year	Entrant	Car	1	2	3	4	5	6	7	8	9	10	11	12	13	WRX	Points
2014	Team Peugeot-Hansen	Peugeot 208 T16	POR; 8	GBR; 11	NOR; 6	FIN; 9	SWE; 11	BEL; 2	CAN; 7	FRA; 3	GER; 6	ITA; 1	TUR; 2	ARG; 4		4th	199
2015	Team Peugeot-Hansen	Peugeot 208 WRX	POR; 3	HOC; 3	BEL; 8	GBR; 8	GER; 3	SWE; 2	CAN; 7	NOR; 1	FRA; 1	BAR; 3	TUR; 1	ITA; 7	ARG; 6	2nd	275
2016	Team Peugeot-Hansen	Peugeot 208 WRX	POR; 9	HOC; DSQ	BEL; 7	GBR; 3	NOR; 2	SWE; 3	CAN; 1	FRA; 8	BAR; 2	LAT; 3	GER; 11	ARG; 13		6th	178
2017	Team Peugeot-Hansen	Peugeot 208 WRX	BAR; 5	POR; 4†	HOC; 3	BEL; 2	GBR; 6	NOR; 5	SWE; 4	CAN; 6	FRA; 6	LAT; 9‡	GER; 2	RSA; 2		5th	201
2018	Team Peugeot Total	Peugeot 208 WRX	BAR; 7	POR; 6	BEL; 3	GBR; 8	NOR; 5	SWE; 4	CAN; 2	FRA; 5	LAT; 5‡	USA; 6‡	GER; 7	RSA; 6		6th	192
2019	Team Hansen MJP	Peugeot 208 WRX	UAE; 12	BAR; 1	BEL; 4	GBR; 1	NOR; 6	SWE; 6	CAN; 13	FRA; 1	LAT; 1	RSA; 4				1st	211
2020	Team Hansen	Peugeot 208 WRX	SWE; 6	SWE; 11	FIN; 3	FIN; 5	LAT; 3	LAT; 4	BAR; 1	BAR; 2						3rd	163
2021	Hansen World RX Team	Peugeot 208 WRX	ESP; 2	SWE; 1	FRA; 1	LAT; 2	LAT; 3	BNL; 4	POR; 2	GER; 5	GER; 4					2nd	217
2022	Hansen World RX Team	Peugeot 208 RX1e	NOR; 2	LAT; 3	LAT; 4	POR; 3	POR; 4	BNL; 4	BNL; 7	ESP; 1	ESP; 2	GER; 3				2nd	136
2023	Hansen World RX Team	Peugeot 208 RX1e	POR; 7	NOR; 10	SWE; 2	GBR; C	BNL; C	GER; C								6th	78
2023	Hansen World RX Team	OMSE ZEROID X1							RSA; 4	RSA; 4	CHN; 9	CHN; 4				6th	78
2024	Hansen World RX Team	Peugeot 208 RX1e	SWE; 4	SWE; 6	HUN; 4	HUN; 4	BNL; 1	BNL; 5	PRT; 6	PRT; 3	TUR; 4	TUR; 3				4th	181
2025	Hansen World RX Team	Peugeot 208 RX1e	PRT; 2	SWE; 3	HUN; 3	FIN; 4	TUR	TUR								5th	70

^{†} 10 championship points deducted for use of an unregistered tyre in Q3.
^{‡} Fifteen championship points deducted for use of a fourth engine in the championship.

=== Complete Extreme E results ===
(key)

Year	Team	Car	1	2	3	4	5	6	7	8	9	10	Pos.	Points
2021	Andretti United Extreme E	Spark ODYSSEY 21	DES; Q 4	DES; R 2	OCE; Q 8	OCE; R 9	ARC; Q 4	ARC; R 1	ISL; Q 6	ISL; R 6	JUR; Q 7	JUR; R 3	3rd	103
2022	Genesys Andretti United Extreme E	Spark ODYSSEY 21	DES; 7	ISL1; 7	ISL2; 3	COP; 7	ENE; 4						9th	39
2023	Andretti Altawkilat Extreme E	Spark ODYSSEY 21	DES; 1; 10	DES; 2; 8	HYD; 1; 2	HYD; 2; 7	ISL1; 1; 5	ISL1; 2; 3	ISL2; 1; 6	ISL2; 2; 7	COP; 1 DNS	COP; 2 WD	7th	69
2024	Andretti Altawkilat Extreme E	Spark ODYSSEY 21	DES; 1; 5	DES; 2; 2	HYD; 1; 3	HYD; 2; 3	ISL1; 1 C	ISL1; 2 C	ISL2; 1 C	ISL2; 2 C	VAL; 1 C	VAL; 2 C	4th ^{†}	62 ^{†}

^{†} Season abandoned.
