= Hansen Motorsport =

Swedish auto racing team

(Sweden) Hansen Motorsport (Sweden) Team Hansen
- Founded: 1990
- Team principal(s): Kenneth Hansen; Timmy Hansen (for Team Hansen)
- Current series: FIA World Rallycross Championship; FIA Extreme H World Cup
- Former series: FIA European Championships for Rallycross Drivers; Nitro Rallycross
- Current drivers: FIA World Rallycross Championship; 1. (Sweden) Timmy Hansen; 71. (Sweden) Kevin Hansen; FIA Extreme H World Cup (Norway) Andreas Bakkerud (United Kingdom) Catie Munnings
- Teams' Championships: FIA World Rallycross Championship: 2019–2021
- Drivers' Championships: FIA World Rallycross Championship: 2019: Timmy Hansen

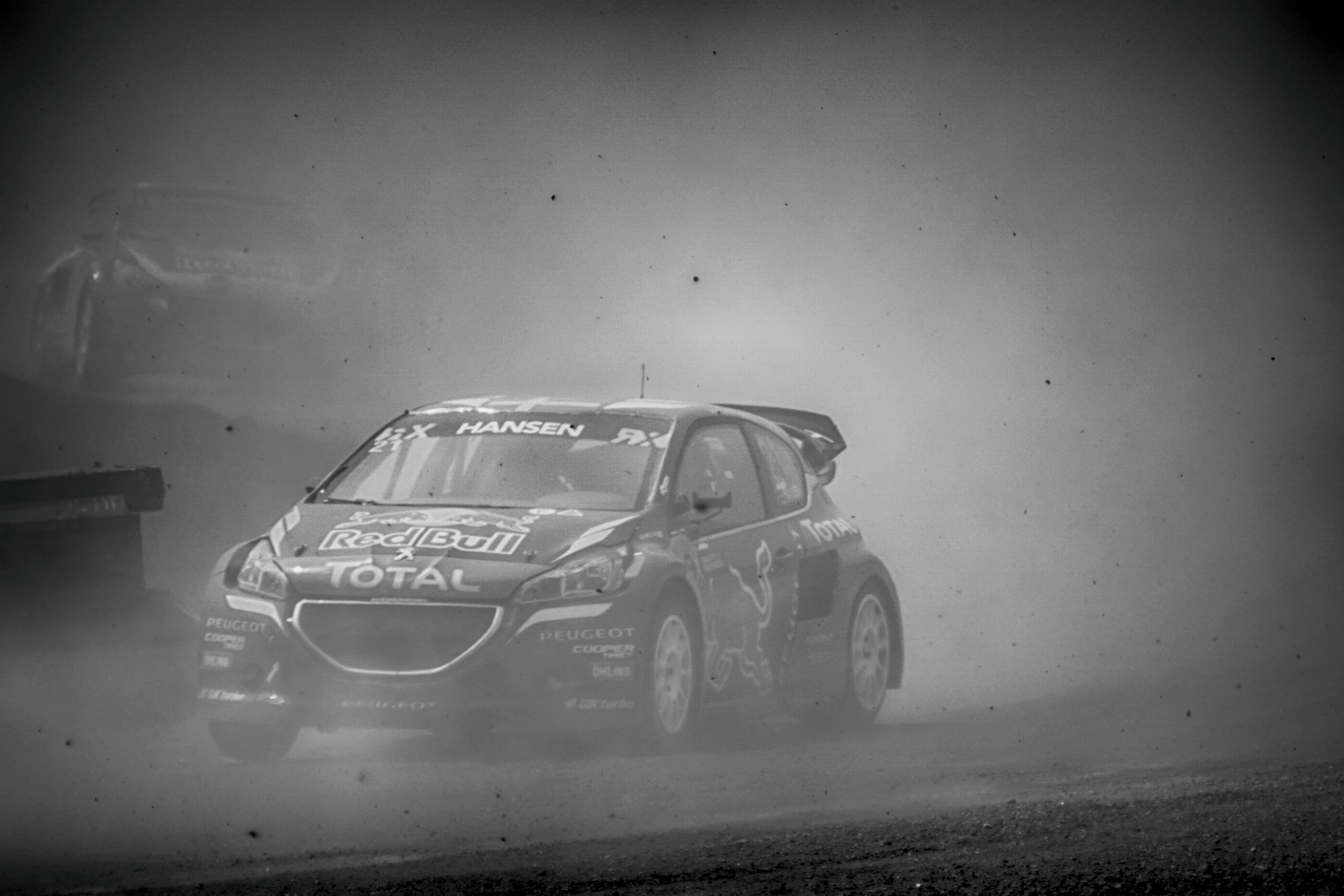
A Hansen Motorsport run Peugeot 208 RX

Hansen Motorsport (officially Kenneth Hansen Motorsport AB), which formerly competed under the title Team Peugeot-Hansen as Peugeot's official partner in the motorsport of rallycross, is a team founded by Swedish racing driver Kenneth Hansen in 1990.

The team has been competing in the FIA World Rallycross Championship since its creation in 2014. Hansen Motorsport used Citroën cars exclusively from 1993 and switched to Peugeot in 2014. Hansen Motorsport ran Peugeot's entry in the World Rallycross Championship from 2014 to 2017.

In December 2017, it was announced that Peugeot Sport would take over the running of Peugeot's factory cars from Hansen Motorsport, through Team Peugeot Total. Kenneth Hansen stayed on as sporting director with Team Peugeot Total.

In September 2025, Hansen Motorsport entered the hydrogen fuel cell off-road racing series FIA Extreme H World Cup as Team Hansen with Andreas Bakkerud and Catie Munnings as the drivers pair. Timmy Hansen will serve as team principal. Timmy and Munnings had raced for Andretti as the driver pair in Extreme E, Extreme H's former series.

Hansen Motorsport has won more top-level rallycross championships than any other team, with four World Championship titles, 19 European Championship titles, two Nitro Rallycross titles and two X Games gold medals. In addition to Hansen World RX Team, which competes in World RX, the team also supports the development of young drivers through its junior programme, #YellowSquad.

== Current drivers ==
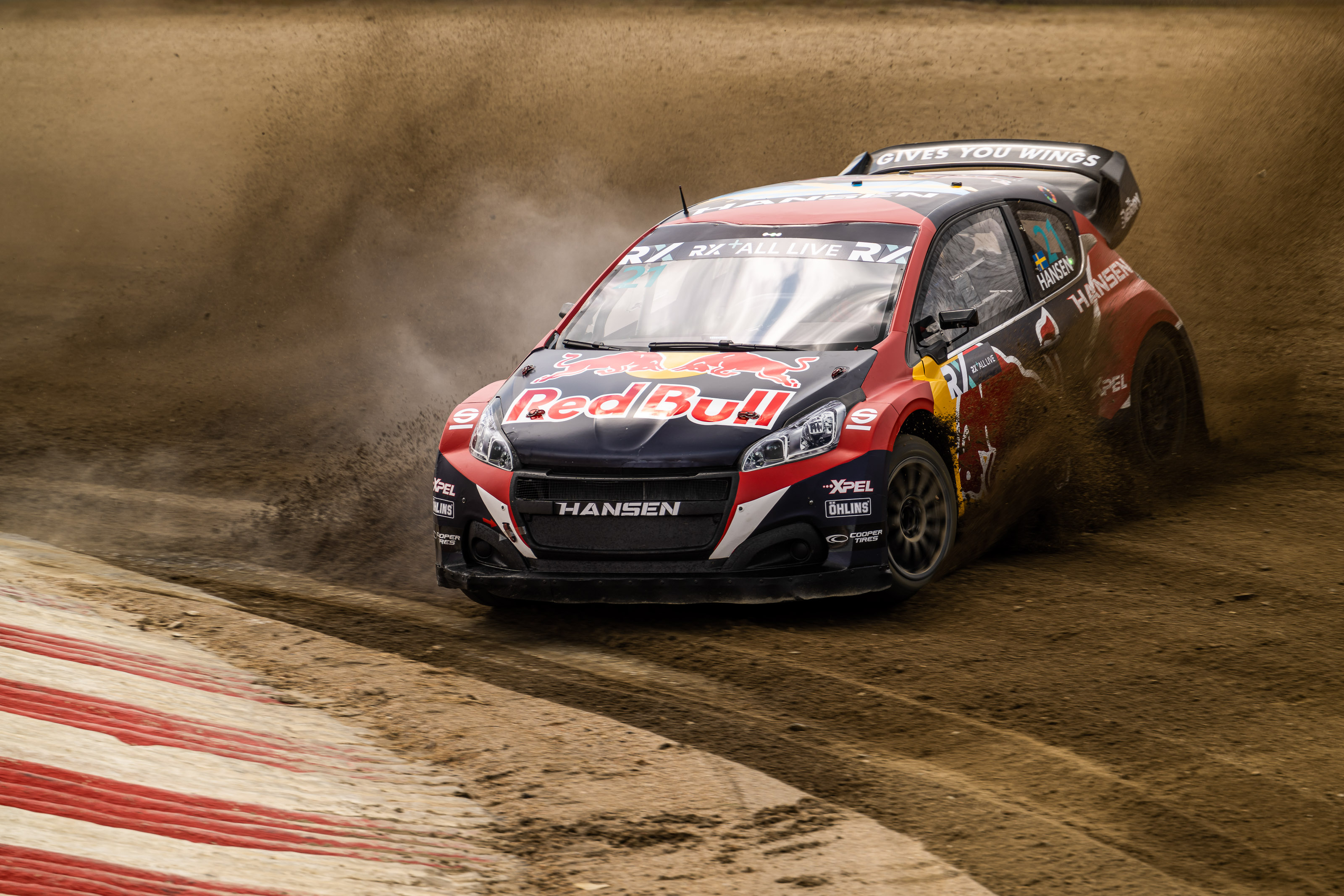
Hansen World RX Team in action during the 2023 World RX of Portugal

Kenneth Timmy Hansen (born 21 May 1992) is a rallycross driver from Sweden. He won the 2019 FIA World Rallycross Championship, driving for Team Peugeot-Hansen. His father is the 14-times European Rallycross Champion Kenneth Hansen, his mother the 1994 ERA European Cup (Group N up to 1400cc) winner Susann Hansen (née Bergvall), and his brother rallycross driver Kevin Hansen.

Timmy initially sought a different path, climbing the single-seater after becoming Swedish karting champion in 2008. In Formula BMW Europe, he raced against the likes of future Formula 1 drivers Carlos Sainz Jr. and Daniil Kvyat, winning races there and in Formula Renault 2.0.

By 2013, Timmy had made the full-time switch to rallycross, finishing third in the European Rallycross Championship that year, and has competed in World RX since the championship's inaugural season in 2014.

Mikael Kevin Hansen (born 28 May 1998) is a rallycross driver from Sweden. He currently competes in the FIA World Rallycross Championship(WRX) Supercar category for Team Peugeot-Hansen. He is also currently competing in Extreme E for Veloce Racing alongside Molly Taylor.

His father is the 14-time European Rallycross Champion Kenneth Hansen. He is also the youngest driver to race in a WRX event, making his debut at 17 years and 6 months old.

Kevin had already become the youngest FIA European Rallycross Champion, taking the title on debut in 2016 driving a Supercar. Winning four races out of five that season led to his FIA Rookie of the Year award, joining the likes of Max Verstappen and Charles Leclerc in winning the accolade.

Competing in 48 rounds since his World RX debut in late 2015, Kevin's 2023 campaign was the most successful to date, finishing second in the championship race with an event win at the inaugural World RX of Hong Kong, China.

== Racing record ==
=== Complete FIA European Rallycross Championship results ===
(key)

==== Division 1 ====
Year	Entrant	Car	Driver	1	2	3	4	5	6	7	8	9	10	11	ERX	Points
1990	Hansen Motorsport	Ford Sierra RS 500 Cosworth	(Sweden) Kenneth Hansen	AUT; 4	SWE (10)	FIN; 1	IRE; 1	FRA (6)	BEL (6)	NED; 1	NOR; 1	GER; 4	GBR; 3		1st	121
1991	Hansen Motorsport	Ford Sierra RS 500 Cosworth	(Sweden) Kenneth Hansen	POR; 1	AUT (2)	FIN (2)	FRA; 1	IRE; 1	SWE; 1	BEL; 1	NED; 1	NOR; 1	GBR (2)	GER (6)	1st	140
1992	Hansen Motorsport	Ford Sierra RS 500 Cosworth	(Sweden) Kenneth Hansen	GBR; 2	AUT; DNS	POR; 3	FIN (6)	SWE (3)	FRA (4)	IRE; 1	BEL; 2	NED; 2	NOR; 1	GER (3)	1st	128

==== Division 2 ====
Year	Entrant	Car	Driver	1	2	3	4	5	6	7	8	9	10	11	12	ERX	Points
1993	Hansen Motorsport	Citroën ZX 16V Turbo	(Sweden) Kenneth Hansen	AUT; 1	POR; 2	FRA (6)	IRE; 4	SWE; 1	FIN (6)	BEL; 2	NED; 1	NOR; 1	GER (6)			2nd	127
1994	Hansen Motorsport	Citroën ZX 16V Turbo	(Sweden) Kenneth Hansen	AUT; 1	POR; 1	FRA (4)	IRE; 2	GBR; 2	SWE; 1	FIN (2)	BEL; 1	NED (3)	NOR; 1	GER (2)		1st	134
1995	Hansen Motorsport	Citroën ZX 16V Turbo	(Sweden) Kenneth Hansen	AUT; 3	POR; 2	FRA (3)	SWE; 1	GBR; 1	IRE; 1	BEL; 2	NED; 2	NOR (5)	FIN (4)	CZE (6)	GER; 1	2nd	146
1996	Hansen Motorsport	Citroën ZX 16V Turbo	(Sweden) Kenneth Hansen	AUT (3)	POR (6)	FRA; 2	SWE; 2	IRE (3)	GBR; 1	BEL; 1	NED; 2	NOR; 2	CZE (2)	GER; 1		1st	128

==== Division 1^{*} ====
Year	Entrant	Car	No.	Driver	1	2	3	4	5	6	7	8	9	10	11	ERX	Points
1997	Hansen Motorsport	Citroën ZX 16V Turbo	1	(Sweden) Kenneth Hansen	AUT; 4	FRA; 4	POR; 2	GBR (4)	SWE; 2	FIN; 2	BEL; 1	NOR; 2	CZE; 5	GER; 6		2nd	114
1998	Hansen Motorsport	Citroën Xsara VTS T16	2	(Sweden) Kenneth Hansen	AUT; 1	POR; 2	FRA (5)	SWE (6)	GBR; 2	FIN; 2	BEL; 1	NOR; 1	GER; 2	CZE (2)		1st	128
1999	Hansen Motorsport	Citroën Xsara VTS T16	1	(Sweden) Kenneth Hansen	CZE; 4	FRA; 2	POR; 1	SWE (10)	FIN; 5	BEL; 1	NED; 3	NOR (6)	GER; 1			2nd	117
2000	Hansen Motorsport	Citroën Xsara WRC	2	(Sweden) Kenneth Hansen	POR (6)	FRA; 1	CZE; 2	SWE; 1	BEL (6)	NED; 1	NOR; 2	POL; 2	GER; 1			1st	131
2001	Hansen Motorsport	Citroën Xsara WRC	1	(Sweden) Kenneth Hansen	FRA; 1	POR; 1	AUT; 1	CZE (5)	SWE (1)	BEL; 3	NED (4)	NOR; 1	POL (12)	GER; 2		1st	112
2002	Hansen Motorsport	Citroën Xsara WRC	1	(Sweden) Kenneth Hansen	POR; 1	FRA; 1	AUT (2)	CZE; 1	SWE; 1	BEL; 3	NED; 2	NOR; 1	POL; 1	GER (5)		1st	152
2003	Hansen Motorsport	Citroën Xsara T16	1	(Sweden) Kenneth Hansen	POR; 1	FRA; 2	AUT; 1	CZE (6)	SWE; 1	BEL; 1	NED; 1	NOR; 2	POL (8)	GER; 1		1st	154
2004	Hansen Motorsport	Citroën Xsara T16	1	(Sweden) Kenneth Hansen	POR; 3	FRA (6)	CZE; 2	AUT; 1	NOR; 1	SWE; 2	BEL; 1	NED; 3	POL (6)	GER; 1		1st	144
2005	Hansen Motorsport	Citroën Xsara T16	1	(Sweden) Kenneth Hansen	FRA; 1	POR; 1	AUT; 1	CZE (10)	NOR; 2	SWE (6)	BEL; 3	NED; 3	POL; 3	GER; 2		1st	139
2006	Hansen Motorsport	Citroën C4 T16	1	(Sweden) Kenneth Hansen	POR; 1	FRA; 3	CZE; 3	AUT; 1	SWE; 2	HUN (5)	BEL; 4	NED; 6	NOR; 2	POL; 6	GER (7)	2nd	139
2007	Hansen Motorsport	Citroën C4 T16	2	(Sweden) Kenneth Hansen	POR; 3	FRA; 2	HUN; 2	AUT (7)	SWE; 4	NOR; 5	BEL; 4	NED; 1	POL; 2	CZE (18)		2nd	124
2008	Hansen Motorsport	Citroën C4 T16	2	(Sweden) Kenneth Hansen	POR; 2	FRA; 3	HUN; 1	AUT (8)	NOR; 2	SWE; 2	BEL; 3	NED; 2	CZE; 1	POL; 4	GER (7)	1st	151
2009	Hansen Motorsport	Citroën C4 T16	1	(Sweden) Kenneth Hansen	GBR; 1	POR (5)	FRA; 5	HUN; 4	AUT; 2	SWE; 5	BEL; 3	GER (11)	POL; 3	CZE; 11		3rd	110
2010	Kenneth Hansen Racing	Citroën C4 T16	3	(Sweden) Kenneth Hansen	POR; 3	FRA (6)	GBR; 2	HUN; 3	SWE; 2	FIN; 4	BEL (7)	GER; 2	POL; 3	CZE; 3		2nd	124
2010	Kenneth Hansen Racing	Citroën C4 T16	15	(United Kingdom) Liam Doran	POR; 4	FRA; 3	GBR; 3	HUN; 7	SWE; 7	FIN; 1	BEL; 2	GER; 6	POL; 1	CZE; 6		3rd	112

^{*} Division 2 was rebranded as Division 1 in 1997.

==== Supercar ====
Year	Entrant	Car	No.	Driver	1	2	3	4	5	6	7	8	9	10	ERX	Points
2011	Citroën Hansen Motorsport	Citroën DS3	2	(Sweden) Kenneth Hansen	GBR	POR	FRA	NOR	SWE; 2	BEL	NED	AUT	POL	CZE; 2	15th	34
2011	Namus Hansen Motorsport	Citroën C4 T16	21	(Russia) Timur Timerzyanov	GBR; 5	POR; 3	FRA; 5	NOR; 3	SWE (15)	BEL; 1	NED (11)	AUT; 2	POL; 7	CZE; 4	3rd	114
2012	Namus Hansen Motorsport	Citroën DS3	3	(Russia) Timur Timerzyanov	GBR; DNS	FRA; 4	AUT; 1	HUN; 1	NOR; 3	SWE; 1	BEL; 1	NED; 1	FIN; 1	GER; 14	1st	148
2012	Citroën Hansen Motorsport	Citroën C4 T16	23	(Norway) Alexander Hvaal	GBR; NC	FRA; 2	AUT; 2	HUN; 4	NOR; 6	SWE; 3	BEL; 19	NED; 8	FIN; DNS	GER; NC	7th	82
2012	Citroën Hansen Motorsport	Citroën DS3	66	(Sweden) Timmy Hansen	GBR	FRA	AUT	HUN	NOR	SWE	BEL	NED	FIN; 5	GER	24th	1
2013	Namus Hansen Motorsport	Citroën DS3	1	(Russia) Timur Timerzyanov	GBR; 5	POR; 6	HUN; 2	FIN; 2	NOR; 2	SWE; 11	FRA; 4	AUT; 2	GER; 4		1st	148
2013	Citroën Hansen Motorsport	Citroën DS3	21	(Sweden) Timmy Hansen	GBR; 3	POR; 11	HUN; 1	FIN; 3	NOR; 9	SWE; 3	FRA; 8	AUT; 10	GER; 13		3rd	145
2013	Citroën Hansen Motorsport	Citroën DS3	25	(Norway) Alexander Hvaal	GBR; 8	POR; 4	HUN; 6	FIN; 12	NOR; 4	SWE; 7	FRA; 10	AUT; 1	GER; 1		6th	116
2015	Hansen Talent Development	Peugeot 208 WRX	16	(Hungary) Tamás Pál Kiss	BEL	GER	NOR	BAR	ITA; 6						18th	20
2015	Hansen Talent Development	Peugeot 208 WRX	111	(Sweden) Fredrik Salsten	BEL	GER	NOR	BAR; 7	ITA						20th	15
2015	Hansen Talent Development	Peugeot 208 WRX	199	(Latvia) Jānis Baumanis	BEL	GER	NOR; 3	BAR	ITA						14th	23
2016	Peugeot-Hansen Academy	Peugeot 208 WRX	71	(Sweden) Kevin Hansen	BEL; 1	NOR; 1	SWE; 1	BAR; 1	LAT; 2						1st	143

==== Super 1600 ====
Year	Entrant	Car	No.	Driver	1	2	3	4	5	6	7	8	9	10	ERX	Points
2012	Citroën Hansen Motorsport	Citroën C2	21	(Sweden) Eric Färén	GBR; 12	FRA (33)	AUT; 10	HUN; 4	NOR; 10	SWE; 4	BEL (17)	NED; 13	FIN; 4	GER; 12	7th	67
2013	Citroën Hansen Motorsport	Citroën C2	21	(Sweden) Eric Färén	GBR; 3	POR; 2	HUN; 7	FIN; 3	NOR; 5	SWE; 4	FRA; 5	AUT; 5	GER; 5		4th	184

==== JRX Junior Rallycross Cup ====
Year	Entrant	Car	No.	Driver	1	2	3	4	5	6	JRX	Points
2012	Hansen Junior Team	JRX "Citroën DS3"	1	(Sweden) Kevin Hansen	SWE1; 1	BEL; 2	NED; 3	SWE2; 1	FIN; 1	GER; 1	1st	112
2013	Hansen Junior Team	JRX "Citroën DS3"	1	(Sweden) Kevin Hansen	HUN; 3	FIN; 3	NOR; 2	SWE; 1	AUT; 1	GER; 1	1st	123

=== Complete FIA World Rallycross Championship results ===
(key)

==== Supercar ====
Year	Entrant	Car	No.	Driver	1	2	3	4	5	6	7	8	9	10	11	12	13	WRX	Points	Teams	Points
2014	Team Peugeot-Hansen	Peugeot 208 T16	1	(Russia) Timur Timerzyanov	POR; 7	GBR; 29	NOR; 4	FIN; 11	SWE; 7	BEL; 7	CAN; 3	FRA; 6	GER; 7	ITA; 4	TUR; 8	ARG; 8		7th	152	3rd	351
2014	Team Peugeot-Hansen	Peugeot 208 T16	3	(Sweden) Timmy Hansen	POR; 8	GBR; 11	NOR; 6	FIN; 9	SWE; 11	BEL; 2	CAN; 7	FRA; 3	GER; 6	ITA; 1	TUR; 2	ARG; 4		4th	199	3rd	351
2015	Team Peugeot-Hansen	Peugeot 208 WRX	17	(Sweden) Timmy Hansen	POR; 3	HOC; 3	BEL; 8	GBR; 8	GER; 3	SWE; 2	CAN; 7	NOR; 1	FRA; 1	BAR; 3	TUR; 1	ITA; 7	ARG; 6	2nd	275	1st	476
2015	Team Peugeot-Hansen	Peugeot 208 WRX	21	(France) Davy Jeanney	POR; 5	HOC; 10	BEL; 9	GBR; 11	GER; 1	SWE; 12	CAN; 1	NOR; 2	FRA; 11	BAR; 4	TUR; 5	ITA; 10	ARG; 8	5th	201	1st	476
2015	Team Peugeot-Hansen	Peugeot 208 WRX	177	(United Kingdom) Andrew Jordan	POR	HOC	BEL	GBR; 7	GER	SWE	CAN	NOR	FRA	BAR	TUR	ITA	ARG	24th	13	N/A	N/A
2015	Hansen Talent Development	Peugeot 208 WRX	90	(Sweden) Eric Färén	POR	HOC	BEL	GBR	GER	SWE; 10	CAN	NOR	FRA	BAR	TUR	ITA	ARG	26th	10	N/A	N/A
2015	Hansen Talent Development	Peugeot 208 WRX	199	(Latvia) Jānis Baumanis	POR	HOC	BEL	GBR; 20	GER	SWE	CAN	NOR	FRA	BAR	TUR; 17	ITA	ARG	40th	0	N/A	N/A
2016	Team Peugeot-Hansen	Peugeot 208 WRX	9	(France) Sébastien Loeb	POR; 5	HOC; 10	BEL; 2	GBR; 10	NOR; 5	SWE; 2	CAN; 9	FRA; 3	BAR; 8	LAT; 1	GER; 8	ARG; 8		5th	209	2nd	387
2016	Team Peugeot-Hansen	Peugeot 208 WRX	21	(Sweden) Timmy Hansen	POR; 9	HOC; 18	BEL; 7	GBR; 3	NOR; 2	SWE; 3	CAN; 1	FRA; 8	BAR; 2	LAT; 3	GER; 11	ARG; 13		6th	178	2nd	387
2016	Peugeot-Hansen Academy	Peugeot 208 WRX	17	(France) Davy Jeanney	POR; 11	HOC; 9	BEL; 11	GBR; 13	NOR; 11	SWE; 12	CAN	FRA; 9	BAR; 12	LAT; 10	GER; 10	ARG		12th	86	N/A	N/A
2016	Peugeot-Hansen Academy	Peugeot 208 WRX	71	(Sweden) Kevin Hansen	POR; 13	HOC; 19	BEL	GBR; 4	NOR	SWE	CAN	FRA; 11	BAR	LAT	GER; 4	ARG		15th	52	N/A	N/A
2017	Team Peugeot-Hansen	Peugeot 208 WRX	9	(France) Sébastien Loeb	BAR; 14	POR; 2	HOC; 5	BEL; 7	GBR; 4	NOR; 3	SWE; 3	CAN; 3	FRA; 2	LAT; 3	GER; 11	RSA; 10		4th	214	2nd	415
2017	Team Peugeot-Hansen	Peugeot 208 WRX	21	(Sweden) Timmy Hansen	BAR; 5	POR; 4†	HOC; 3	BEL; 2	GBR; 6	NOR; 5	SWE; 4	CAN; 6	FRA; 6	LAT; 9‡	GER; 2	RSA; 2		5th	201	2nd	415
2017	Team Peugeot-Hansen	Peugeot 208 WRX	71	(Sweden) Kevin Hansen	BAR; 11	POR; 8	HOC; 8	BEL; 21	GBR; 13	NOR; 9	SWE; 13	CAN; 10	FRA; 8	LAT; 10	GER; 6	RSA; 6		8th	115	N/A	N/A
2018	Team Peugeot Total	Peugeot 208 RX	09	(France) Sébastien Loeb	BAR; 2	POR; 2	BEL; 1	GBR; 3	NOR; 8	SWE; 9	CAN; 3	FRA; 6	LAT; 3	USA; 4	GER; 8	RSA; 3		4th	229	3rd	421
2018	Team Peugeot Total	Peugeot 208 RX	21	(Sweden) Timmy Hansen	BAR; 7	POR; 6	BEL; 3	GBR; 8	NOR; 5	SWE; 4	CAN; 2	FRA; 5	LAT; 5a	USA; 6a	GER; 7	RSA; 6		6th	192	3rd	421
2018	Team Peugeot Total	Peugeot 208 RX	71	(Sweden) Kevin Hansen	BAR; 13	POR; 8	BEL; 9	GBR; 6	NOR; 4	SWE; 5	CAN; 9	FRA; 7a	LAT; 6	USA; 7	GER; 6	RSA; 4		8th	145	3rd	421
2019	Team Hansen MJP	Peugeot 208 RX	21	(Sweden) Timmy Hansen	ABU; 13	BAR; 1	BEL; 4	GBR; 1	NOR; 6	SWE; 6	CAN; 13	FRA; 1	LAT; 1	RSA; 4				1st	211	1st	410
2019	Team Hansen MJP	Peugeot 208 RX	71	(Sweden) Kevin Hansen	ABU; 1	BAR; 2	BEL; 8	GBR; 7	NOR; 2	SWE; 2	CAN; 6	FRA; 3	LAT; 4	RSA; 5				3rd	199	1st	410
2020	Team Hansen	Peugeot 208 RX	01	(Sweden) Timmy Hansen	SWE; 6	SWE; 11	FIN; 3	FIN; 5	LAT; 3	LAT; 4	BAR; 1	BAR; 2						3rd	163	2nd	310
2020	Team Hansen	Peugeot 208 RX	09	(Sweden) Kevin Hansen	SWE; 8	SWE; 2	FIN; 6	FIN; 7	LAT; 4	LAT; 6	BAR; 3	BAR; 7						5th	135	2nd	310
2021	Hansen World RX Team	Peugeot 208	21	(Sweden) Timmy Hansen	BAR; 2	SWE; 1	FRA; 1	LAT; 2	LAT; 3	BEL; 4	POR; 2	GER; 5	GER; 4					2nd	217	1st	408
2021	Hansen World RX Team	Peugeot 208	09	(Sweden) Kevin Hansen	BAR; 1	SWE; 2	FRA; 2	LAT; 3	LAT; 5	BEL; 2	POR; 3	GER; 9	GER; 2					4th	191	1st	408
2022	Hansen World RX Team	Peugeot 208	21	(Sweden) Timmy Hansen	NOR; 2	LAT; 3	LAT; 4	POR; 3	POR; 4	BEL; 4	BEL; 7	CAT; 1	CAT; 2	GER; 3				2nd	136	2nd	259
2022	Hansen World RX Team	Peugeot 208	71	(Sweden) Kevin Hansen	NOR; 7	LAT; 2	LAT; 2	POR; 4	POR; 7	BEL; 2	BEL; 4	CAT; 5	CAT; 6	GER; 5				5th	122	2nd	259
2023	Hansen World RX Team	Peugeot 208	21	(Sweden) Timmy Hansen	POR; 7(3)	NOR; 10	SWE; 2(3)	GBR; C	BEL; C	GER; C	RSA; 4(2)	RSA; 4	HKG; 9	HKG; 4				6th	78	3rd	71
2023	Hansen World RX Team	Peugeot 208	71	(Sweden) Kevin Hansen	POR; 2	NOR; 9(3)	SWE; 4(2)	GBR; C	BEL; C	GER; C	RSA; 2	RSA; 2(3)	HKG; 1(1)	HKG; 7(3)				2nd	104	3rd	71

^{†} Ten championship points deducted for use of an unregistered tyre in Q3.
^{‡} Fifteen championship points deducted for use of a fourth engine in the championship.

a loss of fifteen championship points - stewards' decision

(1-3) Top 3 heat ranking

==== RX Lites Cup ====
Year	Entrant	Car	No.	Driver	1	2	3	4	5	6	7	Lites	Points
2014	Hansen Junior Team	Lites "Peugeot 208"	81	(Sweden) Kevin Hansen	POR	GBR	FIN; 1	SWE; 2	ITA; 3	TUR; 2		2nd	99
2015	Hansen Junior Team	Lites "Peugeot 208"	71	(Sweden) Kevin Hansen	POR; 2	GBR; 1	SWE; 2	NOR; 2	BAR; 3	TUR; 2	ITA; 2	1st	178

=== Complete Global RallyCross Championship results ===
(key)

==== Supercar ====
Year	Entrant	Car	No.	Driver	1	2	3	4	5	6	GRC	Points
2012	Hansen Motorsport	Citroën DS3	72	(France) Sébastien Loeb	CHA	TEX	LA; 1	NH	LVS	LVC	17th	21

==== GRC Lites ====
Year	Entrant	Car	No.	Driver	1	2	3	4	5	6	7	8	9	GRC	Points
2014	Hansen Motorsport	Lites "Peugeot 208"	81	(Sweden) Kevin Hansen	AUS	DC	NY	CHA	DAY	LA1; 3	LA2; 6	SEA	LV	9th	73
