= 2015 World RX of Barcelona =

Rallycross event

- Round 10 of 13 in the 2015 FIA World Rallycross Championship
- Date: 19–20 September 2015
- Location: Montmeló, Barcelona
- Venue: Circuit de Barcelona-Catalunya

Results
Heat winners
- Heat 1: (Sweden) Timmy Hansen; Team Peugeot-Hansen
- Heat 2: (Norway) Petter Solberg; SDRX
- Heat 3: Johan Kristoffersson; Volkswagen Team Sweden
- Heat 4: (Sweden) Timmy Hansen; Team Peugeot-Hansen
Semi-final winners
- Semi-final 1: (Sweden) Timmy Hansen; Team Peugeot-Hansen
- Semi-final 2: Johan Kristoffersson; Volkswagen Team Sweden
Final
- First: (Norway) Petter Solberg; SDRX
- Second: Johan Kristoffersson; Volkswagen Team Sweden
- Third: (Sweden) Timmy Hansen; Team Peugeot-Hansen

Rallycross layout of the Circuit de Catalunya

The 2015 World RX of Barcelona was the tenth round of the second season of the FIA World Rallycross Championship. The event was held at the Circuit de Barcelona-Catalunya in Montmeló, Catalonia.

Reigning champion and championship leader Petter Solberg took his third victory of the season, to extend his championship lead to 35 points over Timmy Hansen. Hansen, who had finished as top qualifier for the fourth meeting in succession – including two heat wins – also won a semi-final but could only finish third in the final, behind compatriot Johan Kristoffersson.

In the supporting round of the FIA European Rallycross Championship, Kristoffersson's teammate Ole Christian Veiby took his first victory after on-the-road winner Tommy Rustad, the championship leader, was disqualified after a breach of the championship regulations. Veiby finished ahead of compatriot Alexander Hvaal with Joni-Pekka Rajala of Finland completing the podium.

== Heats ==
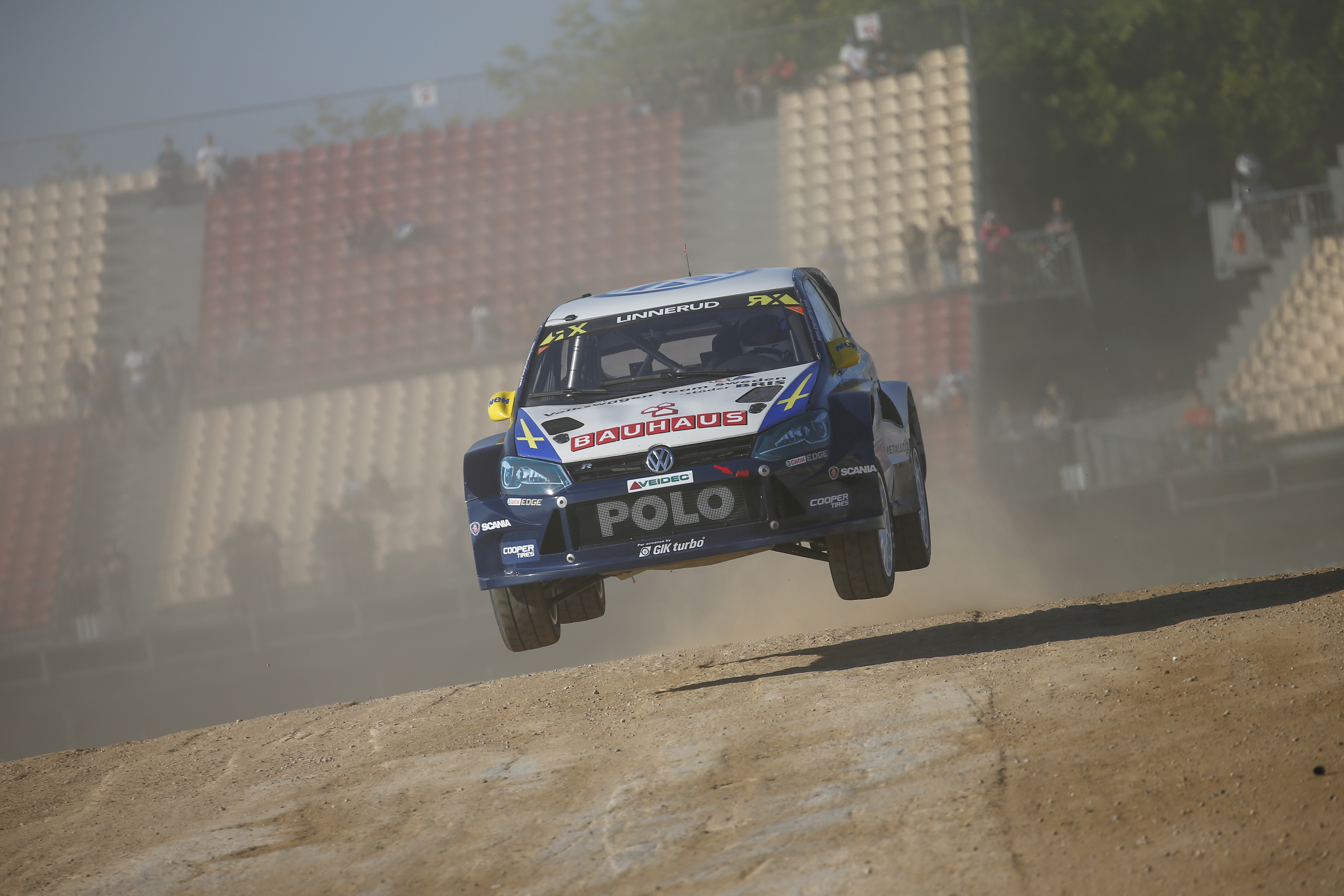
Tord Linnerud

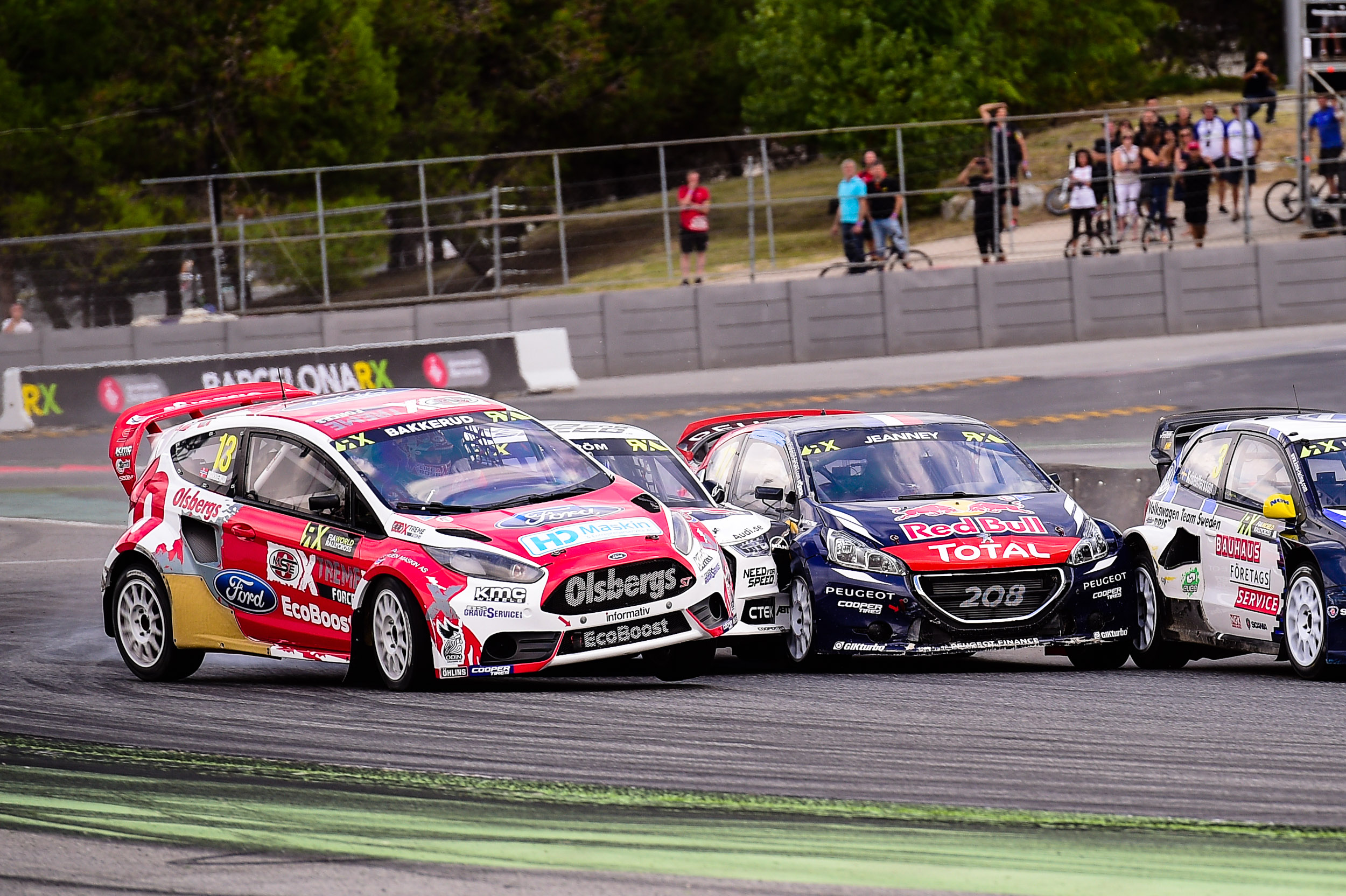
Andreas Bakkerud, Mattias Ekström, Davy Jeanney and Johan Kristoffersson

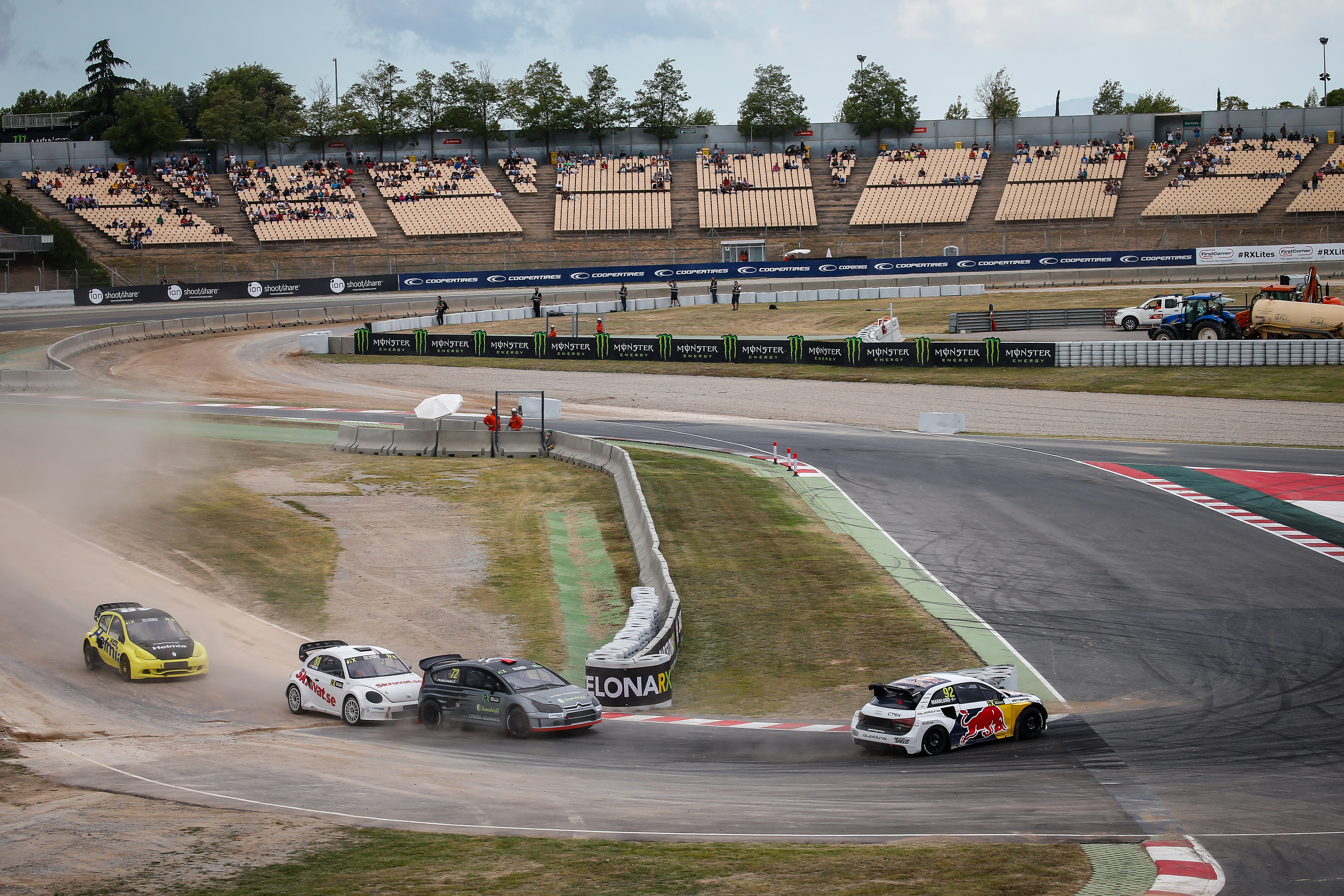
Anton Marklund, Philippe Maloigne, Henning Solberg and Lukas Walfridson

World Championship classification
Pos.	No.	Driver	Team	Car	H1	H2	H3	H4	Pts
1	21	(Sweden) Timmy Hansen	Team Peugeot-Hansen	Peugeot 208	1st	6th	6th	1st	16
2	3	(Sweden) Johan Kristoffersson	Volkswagen Team Sweden	Volkswagen Polo	2nd	5th	1st	5th	15
3	10	(Sweden) Mattias Ekström	EKS RX	Audi S1	4th	2nd	5th	4th	14
4	17	(France) Davy Jeanney	Team Peugeot-Hansen	Peugeot 208	3rd	21st	7th	3rd	13
5	4	(Sweden) Robin Larsson	Larsson Jernberg Racing Team	Audi A1	6th	16th	4th	7th	12
6	1	(Norway) Petter Solberg	SDRX	Citroën DS3	10th	1st	32nd	2nd	11
7	15	(Latvia) Reinis Nitišs	Olsbergs MSE	Ford Fiesta ST	7th	3rd	17th	10th	10
8	57	(Finland) Toomas Heikkinen	Marklund Motorsport	Volkswagen Polo	15th	7th	9th	6th	9
9	13	(Norway) Andreas Bakkerud	Olsbergs MSE	Ford Fiesta ST	5th	9th	15th	11th	8
10	42	(Russia) Timur Timerzyanov	Namus OMSE	Ford Fiesta ST	13th	20th	10th	13th	7
11	34	(United States) Tanner Foust	Marklund Motorsport	Volkswagen Polo	38th	4th	2nd	12th	6
12	99	(Norway) Tord Linnerud	Volkswagen Team Sweden	Volkswagen Polo	16th	10th	19th	22nd	5
13	7	(Austria) Manfred Stohl	World RX Team Austria	Ford Fiesta	18th	33rd	11th	8th	4
14	88	(Norway) Henning Solberg	Eklund Motorsport	Volkswagen Beetle	28th	19th	23rd	17th	3
15	92	(Sweden) Anton Marklund	EKS RX	Audi S1	26th	18th	25th	23rd	2
16	44	(Germany) Timo Scheider	All-Inkl.com Münnich Motorsport	Audi S3	39th	11th	24th	18th	1
17	55	(Sweden) Alx Danielsson	All-Inkl.com Münnich Motorsport	Audi S3	20th	37th	8th	26th	
18	33	(United Kingdom) Liam Doran	SDRX	Citroën DS3	35th	13th	14th	37th	
19	31	(Austria) Max Pucher	World RX Team Austria	Ford Fiesta	25th	27th	29th	34th	
20	84	(France) "Knapick"	Hervé "Knapick" Lemonnier	Citroën DS3	32nd	32nd	18th	35th	
21	79	(France) Christophe Jouet	Christophe Jouet	Citroën DS3	27th	38th	40th	40th	
22	49	(United Kingdom) Mark Flaherty	Mark Flaherty	Ford Focus	34th	39th	41st	41st	
European Championship classification
1	24	(Norway) Tommy Rustad	HTB Racing-Marklund Motorsport	Volkswagen Polo	9th	8th	12th	9th	16
2	74	(France) Jérôme Grosset-Janin	Albatec Racing	Peugeot 208	8th	36th	3rd	14th	15
3	11	(Sweden) Fredrik Salsten	Hansen Talent Development	Peugeot 208	11th	29th	13th	15th	14
4	52	(Norway) Ole Christian Veiby	Volkswagen Team Sweden	Volkswagen Polo	21st	15th	16th	20th	13
5	60	(Finland) Joni-Pekka Rajala	Eklund Motorsport	Saab 9-3	12th	12th	20th	33rd	12
6	20	(France) Fabien Pailler	Pailler Compétition	Peugeot 208	14th	25th	27th	21st	11
7	18	(France) Jonathan Pailler	Pailler Compétition	Peugeot 208	19th	24th	30th	19th	10
8	102	(Hungary) Tamás Kárai	Racing-Com	Škoda Fabia	17th	17th	35th	25th	9
9	28	(Norway) Alexander Hvaal	JC Raceteknik	Citroën DS3	23rd	22nd	21st	31st	8
10	8	(Sweden) Peter Hedström	Hedströms Motorsport	Ford Fiesta	24th	30th	31st	16th	7
11	72	(France) Philippe Maloigne	Philippe Maloigne	Citroën C4	29th	26th	22nd	27th	6
12	2	(Republic of Ireland) Oliver O'Donovan	Oliver O'Donovan	Ford Fiesta	31st	23rd	26th	36th	5
13	87	(France) Jean-Baptiste Dubourg	Jean-Baptiste Dubourg	Citroën C4	22nd	14th	36th	38th	4
14	48	(Sweden) Lukas Walfridson	Helmia Motorsport	Renault Clio	30th	28th	37th	24th	3
15	12	(Finland) Riku Tahko	ST Motorsport	BMW MINI Countryman	36th	31st	34th	30th	2
16	80	(Italy) Christian Giarolo	Christian Giarolo	Ford Fiesta	33rd	34th	38th	32nd	1
17	27	(United Kingdom) James Grint	Albatec Racing	Peugeot 208	37th	40th	28th	29th	
18	22	(Belgium) Koen Pauwels	Koen Pauwels	Ford Fiesta	41st	41st	33rd	28th	
19	47	(Sweden) Ramona Karlsson	Ramona RX	Volkswagen Scirocco	40th	35th	39th	39th	
20	14	(Norway) Frode Holte	Frode Holte Motorsport	Hyundai i20	42nd	42nd	42nd	42nd	

== Semi-finals ==
=== World Championship ===
==== Semi-final 1 ====
Pos.	No.	Driver	Team	Time	Pts
1	21	(Sweden) Timmy Hansen	Team Peugeot-Hansen	4:49.381	6
2	4	(Sweden) Robin Larsson	Larsson Jernberg Racing Team	+2.066	5
3	34	(United States) Tanner Foust	Marklund Motorsport	+4.128	4
4	13	(Norway) Andreas Bakkerud	Olsbergs MSE	+4.727	3
5	10	(Sweden) Mattias Ekström	EKS RX	+5.192	2
6	15	(Latvia) Reinis Nitišs	Olsbergs MSE	+5.697	1

==== Semi-final 2 ====
Pos.	No.	Driver	Team	Time	Pts
1	3	(Sweden) Johan Kristoffersson	Volkswagen Team Sweden	4:45.863	6
2	1	(Norway) Petter Solberg	SDRX	+4.415	5
3	17	(France) Davy Jeanney	Team Peugeot-Hansen	+6.287	4
4	57	(Finland) Toomas Heikkinen	Marklund Motorsport	+6.985	3
5	42	(Russia) Timur Timerzyanov	Namus OMSE	+8.059	2
6	99	(Norway) Tord Linnerud	Volkswagen Team Sweden	+14.633	1

=== European Championship ===
==== Semi-final 1 ====
Pos.	No.	Driver	Team	Time	Pts
1	24	(Norway) Tommy Rustad	HTB Racing-Marklund Motorsport	3:16.772	6
2	60	(Finland) Joni-Pekka Rajala	Eklund Motorsport	+2.293	5
3	28	(Norway) Alexander Hvaal	JC Raceteknik	+4.467	4
4	18	(France) Jonathan Pailler	Pailler Compétition	+6.574	3
5	72	(France) Philippe Maloigne	Philippe Maloigne	+8.539	2
6	11	(Sweden) Fredrik Salsten	Hansen Talent Development	DNF	1

==== Semi-final 2 ====
Pos.	No.	Driver	Team	Time	Pts
1	52	(Norway) Ole Christian Veiby	Volkswagen Team Sweden	4:55.233	6
2	74	(France) Jérôme Grosset-Janin	Albatec Racing	+0.772	5
3	2	(Republic of Ireland) Oliver O'Donovan	Oliver O'Donovan	+6.507	4
4	102	(Hungary) Tamás Kárai	Racing-Com	+11.451	3
5	20	(France) Fabien Pailler	Pailler Compétition	+48.169	2
6	8	(Sweden) Peter Hedström	Hedströms Motorsport	EX	0

== Finals ==
=== World Championship ===
Pos.	No.	Driver	Team	Time	Pts
1	1	(Norway) Petter Solberg	SDRX	4:51.051	8
2	3	(Sweden) Johan Kristoffersson	Volkswagen Team Sweden	+2.673	5
3	21	(Sweden) Timmy Hansen	Team Peugeot-Hansen	+2.858	4
4	17	(France) Davy Jeanney	Team Peugeot-Hansen	+5.744	3
5	34	(United States) Tanner Foust	Marklund Motorsport	+5.959	2
6	4	(Sweden) Robin Larsson	Larsson Jernberg Racing Team	DNF	1

=== European Championship ===
Pos.	No.	Driver	Team	Time	Pts
1	52	(Norway) Ole Christian Veiby	Volkswagen Team Sweden	4:53.230	8
2	28	(Norway) Alexander Hvaal	JC Raceteknik	+2.342	5
3	60	(Finland) Joni-Pekka Rajala	Eklund Motorsport	+4.071	4
4	2	(Republic of Ireland) Oliver O'Donovan	Oliver O'Donovan	+5.479	3
5	74	(France) Jérôme Grosset-Janin	Albatec Racing		2
6	24	(Norway) Tommy Rustad	HTB Racing-Marklund Motorsport	DSQ	0

== Standings after the event ==
World Championship standings

Pos	Driver	Pts
1	(Norway) Petter Solberg	243
2	(Sweden) Timmy Hansen	208
3	(Sweden) Johan Kristoffersson	182
4	(France) Davy Jeanney	166
5	(Norway) Andreas Bakkerud	163

European Championship standings

Pos	Driver	Pts
1	(Norway) Tommy Rustad	105
2	(France) Jérôme Grosset-Janin	99
3	(Finland) Joni-Pekka Rajala	74
4	(Norway) Ole Christian Veiby	67
5	(France) Jean-Baptiste Dubourg	53

- Note: Only the top five positions are included for both sets of standings.

Previous race: 2015 World RX of France	FIA World Rallycross Championship; 2015 season	Next race: 2015 World RX of Turkey
Previous race: None	World RX of Barcelona	Next race: 2016 World RX of Barcelona
