= Kristian Sohlberg =

Finnish rally driver (born 1978)

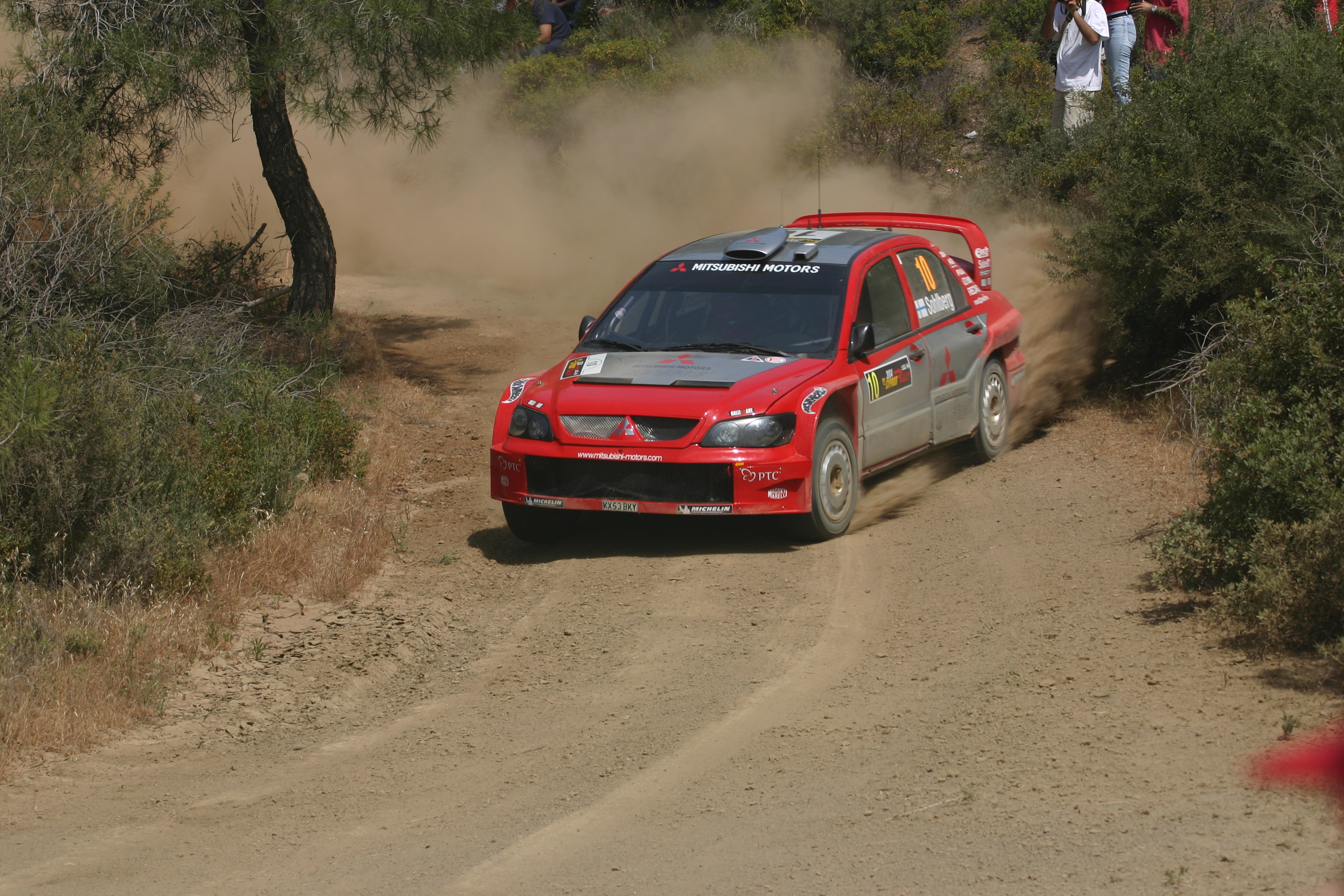
- Sohlberg during the 2004 Cyprus Rally

Personal information
- Nationality: (Finland) Finnish
- Born: 15 March 1978 (age 48)

World Rally Championship record
- Years active: 2000–2007, 2014
- Co-driver: (Finland) Jussi Aariainen (Finland) Jukka Aho (Finland) Jakke Honkanen (Finland) Arto Kapanen (Finland) Kaj Lindström (Finland) Timo Hantunen (Finland) Tomi Tuominen (Finland) Risto Pietiläinen (Finland) Peter Flythström
- Teams: Mitsubishi
- Rallies: 32
- Championships: 0
- Rally wins: 0
- Podiums: 0
- Stage wins: 0
- Total points: 3
- First rally: 2000 Rally Finland
- Last rally: 2014 Rally Finland

Kristian Sohlberg (born 15 March 1978, in Espoo) is a Finnish rally driver, who scored three World Rally Championship points during his career with a best finish of sixth on the 2006 Rally d'Italia Sardegna.

== Career ==
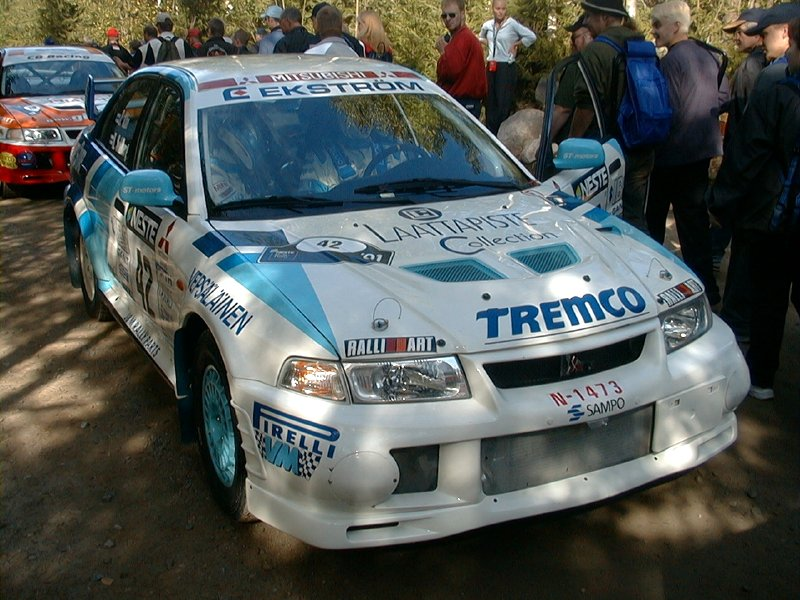
Sohlberg during the 2001 Rally Finland.

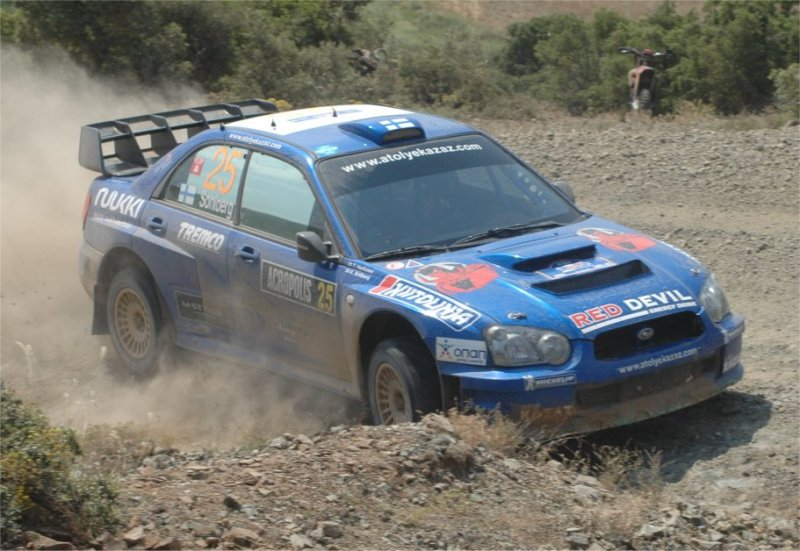
Sohlberg during the 2005 Acropolis Rally.

Sohlberg's first WRC event came on Rally Finland in 2000 in a Mitsubishi Carisma GT N4. In 2002, he contested the Production World Rally Championship, winning the first event of the season in Sweden. A further category win followed on Rally New Zealand, finishing the season as runner-up in the standings.

In 2003, Sohlberg contested three WRC rounds in a Mitsubishi Lancer WRC2. For 2004 he was signed by Mitsubishi Motors to do five events for the team, but he retired from all of them. He started 2005 in a Ford Focus RS WRC on Rally Sweden, before switching to a Subaru Impreza WRC to contest the Acropolis Rally and Rally Finland. He then entered three rounds of the 2006 season, finishing sixth in Sardinia and scoring his first and only WRC points.

Sohlberg returned to the PWRC for 2007, but only did the first four rounds of the season, while a Lancer WRC outing on Rally Finland ended in an accident.

== Racing record ==
=== Complete FIA World Rallycross Championship results ===
==== Supercar ====
Year	Entrant	Car	1	2	3	4	5	6	7	8	9	10	11	12	13	WRX	Points
2015	Albatec Racing	Peugeot 208	POR	HOC	BEL	GBR	GER	SWE	CAN	NOR	FRA	ESP	TUR; 16	ITA	ARG	34th	1
