= Jean-Baptiste Dubourg =

French racing driver

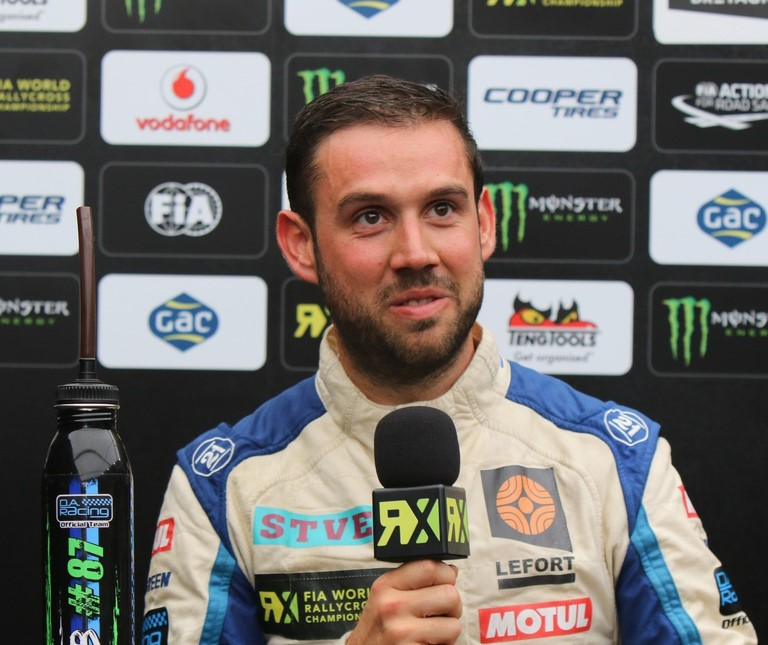
- Nationality: (France) French
- Born: 17 August 1987 (age 39) Bordeaux, France

FIA ERX Supercar Championship career
- Debut season: 2015
- Current team: G-Fors
- Car number: 87
- Former teams: DA Racing
- Starts: 12
- Wins: 0
- Podiums: 2
- Best finish: 5th in 2015, 2018

FIA World Rallycross Championship
- Years active: 2014–2017
- Former teams: DA Racing
- Starts: 16
- Wins: 0
- Podiums: 1
- Best finish: 16th in 2017

Jean-Baptiste Dubourg (born 17 August 1987) is a French racing driver currently participating in the FIA World Rallycross Championship.

== Biography ==
After winning the ice-racing series Andros Trophy of the 2015–2016 season with a Renault Clio Mk3 Prototype he will race in Euro RX for his own team DA Racing in 2016 using an all-new Citroën DS3 Supercar. His father is the 1992 European Autocross Champion Dominique Dubourg, while his younger brother Andréa Dubourg and girlfriend Adeline Sangnier are also rallycross drivers. After a second win in Andros Trophy in 2017, he compete in the FIA World Rallycross Championship with a Peugeot 208.

== Results ==
=== Complete FIA World Rallycross Championship results ===
(key)

==== Supercar ====
Year	Entrant	Car	1	2	3	4	5	6	7	8	9	10	11	12	13	WRX	Points
2014	Jean-Baptiste Dubourg	Citroën C4	POR	GBR	NOR	FIN	SWE	BEL	CAN	FRA; 15	GER	ITA	TUR	ARG		51st	2
2015	Jean-Baptiste Dubourg	Citroën C4	POR; 13	HOC	BEL	GBR	GER	SWE; 18	CAN	NOR	FRA; 3	BAR	TUR	ITA	ARG	17th	24
2016	DA Racing	Citroën DS3	POR	HOC; 16	BEL	GBR	NOR	SWE	CAN	FRA; 17	BAR	LAT	GER	ARG		24th	1
2017	DA Racing	Peugeot 208	BAR; 12	POR; 17	HOC; 17	BEL; 17	GBR; 18	NOR; 15	SWE; 16	CAN; 17	FRA; 13	LAT	GER	RSA; 14		16th	17

=== Complete FIA European Rallycross Championship results ===
(key)

==== Super1600 ====
Year	Entrant	Car	1	2	3	4	5	6	7	8	9	ERX	Points
2013	Jean-Baptiste Dubourg	Renault_Clio#Second_generation_(X65;_1998)	GBR	POR	HUN	FIN	NOR	SWE	FRA; 8	AUT	GER	22nd	14

==== Supercar ====
Year	Entrant	Car	1	2	3	4	5	ERX	Points
2015	Jean-Baptiste Dubourg	Citroën C4	BEL; 8	GER; 4	NOR; 7	BAR; 13	ITA; 2	5th	77
2016	DA Racing	Citroën DS3	BEL; 18	NOR	SWE	BAR; 21	LAT	29th	-10
2018	G-Fors	Renault Clio	BAR; 3	BEL; 13	SWE; 7	FRA; 11	LAT; 7	5th	61
