= World RX of Italy =

Rallycross event held in Italy

The World RX of Italy was a Rallycross event held in Italy for the FIA World Rallycross Championship. The event made its debut in the 2014 season, at the Franciacorta International Circuit in the town of Franciacorta, Lombardy.

== Past winners ==
Year	Heat 1 winner	Heat 2 winner	Heat 3 winner	Heat 4 winner	Semi-Final 1 winner	Semi-Final 2 winner	Final winner
2014	(Sweden) Timmy Hansen	(Sweden) Johan Kristoffersson	(Norway) Petter Solberg	(Sweden) Timmy Hansen	(Sweden) Timmy Hansen	(Russia) Timur Timerzyanov	(Sweden) Timmy Hansen
2015	(Sweden) Johan Kristoffersson	(Norway) Petter Solberg	(Latvia) Reinis Nitišs	(Norway) Petter Solberg	(Sweden) Johan Kristoffersson	(Norway) Andreas Bakkerud	(Norway) Andreas Bakkerud
