= Albatec Racing =

(United Kingdom) Albatec Racing
- Founded: 2013
- Team principal(s): Andy Scott
- Current series: FIA European Rallycross Championship
- Current drivers: 14. (Finland) Jere Kalliokoski; 24. (Norway) Tommy Rustad; 121. (France) Philippe Maloigne

== Racing record ==
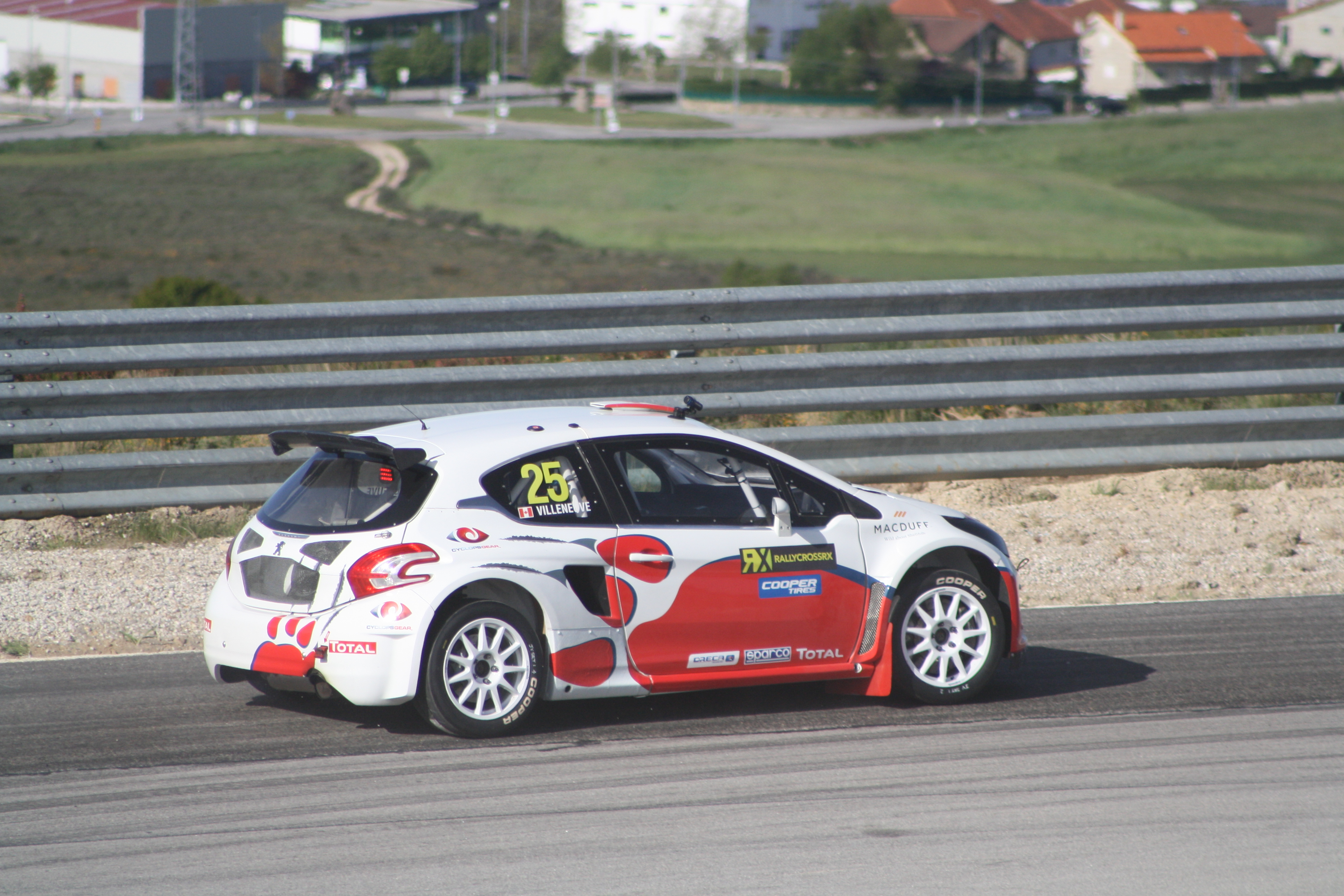
Jacques Villeneuve in action during the 2014 World RX of Portugal

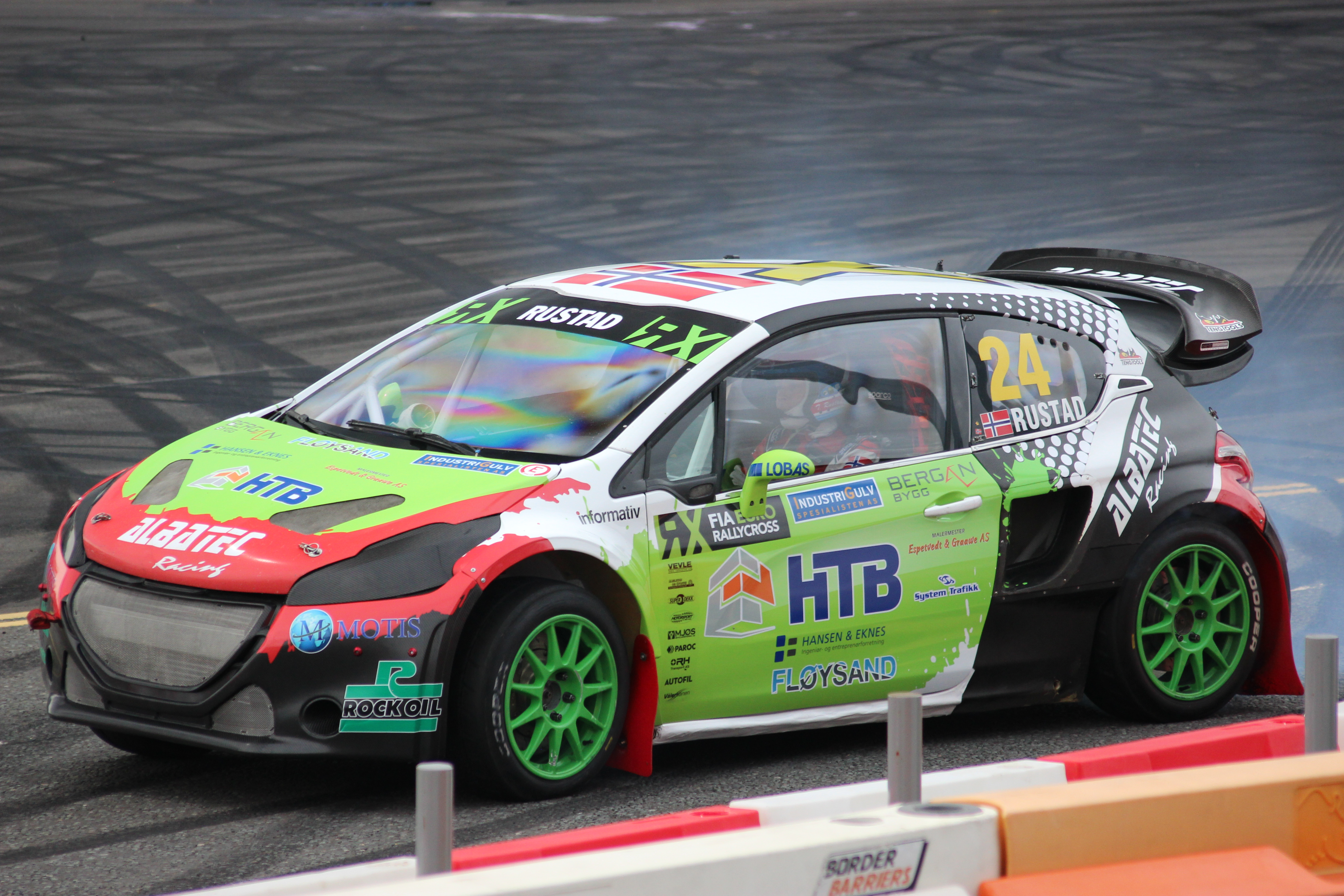
Tommy Rustad at the 2016 Ignition Festival in Glasgow

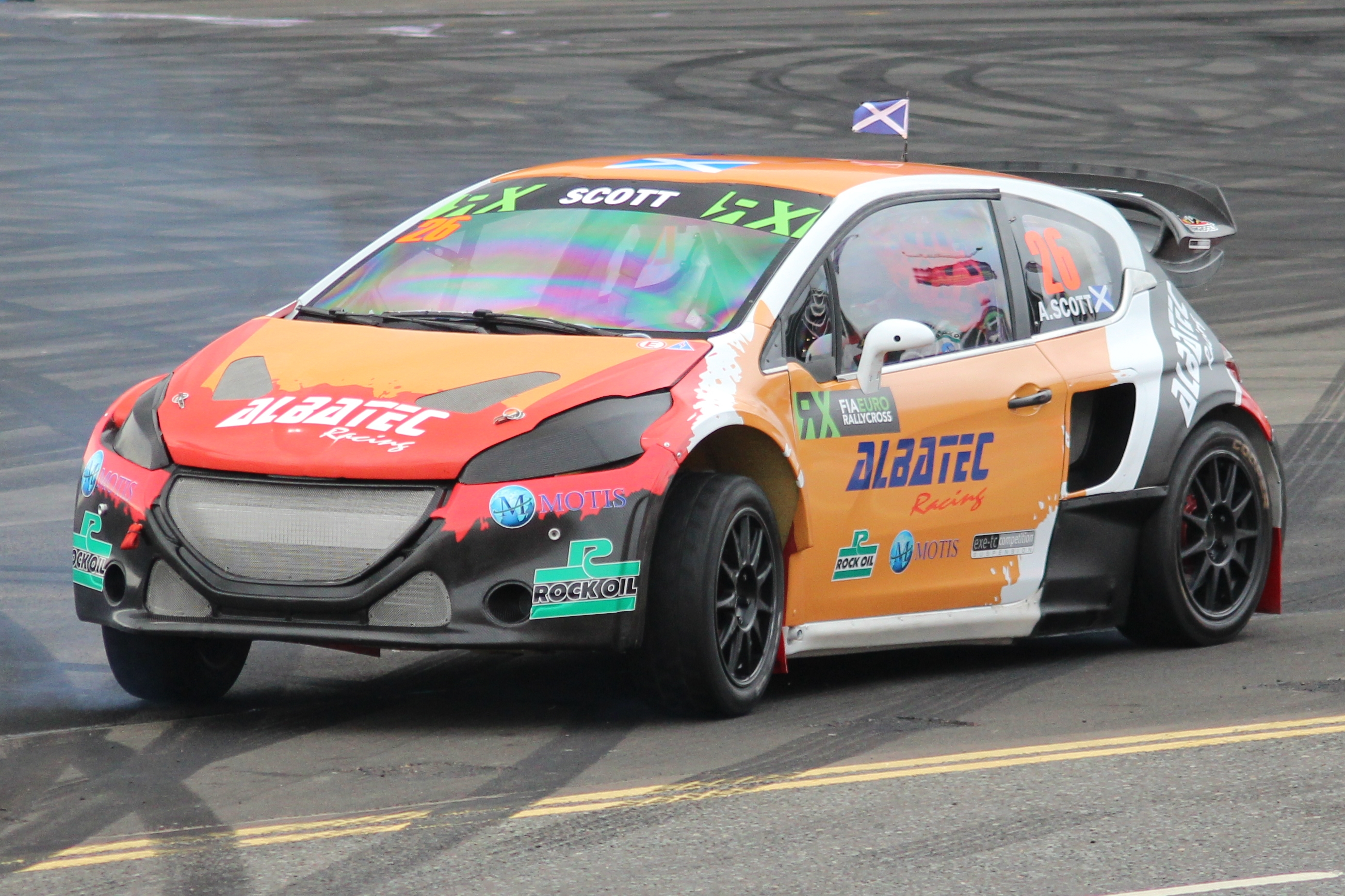
Andy Scott at the 2016 Ignition Festival in Glasgow

=== Complete FIA European Rallycross Championship results ===
(key)

==== Supercar ====
Year	Entrant	Car	No.	Driver	1	2	3	4	5	6	7	8	9	ERX	Points
2013	Albatec Racing	Peugeot 208	26	(United Kingdom) Andy Scott	GBR; 14	POR; 15	HUN; 19	FIN; 26	NOR; 19	SWE; 23	FRA; 15	AUT; 12	POL; 15	40th	3
2013	Albatec Racing	Peugeot 208	27	(United Kingdom) Kris Meeke	GBR	POR	HUN	FIN	NOR	SWE	FRA; 18	AUT	POL	48th	-15
2014	Albatec Racing	Peugeot 208 GTi	27	(France) Davy Jeanney	GBR; 14	NOR	BEL	GER	ITA					9th	27
2014	Albatec Racing	Peugeot 208 GTi	47	(Sweden) Ramona Karlsson	GBR	NOR	BEL	GER; 25	ITA					37th	0
2015	Albatec Racing	Peugeot 208	27	(United Kingdom) James Grint	BEL; 14	GER; 10	NOR; 10	BAR; 17	ITA; 14					13th	24
2015	Albatec Racing	Peugeot 208	74	(France) Jérôme Grosset-Janin	BEL; 1	GER; 2	NOR; 4	BAR; 5	ITA; 5					2nd	117
2016	Albatec-HTB Racing	Peugeot 208	24	(Norway) Tommy Rustad	BEL; 5	NOR; 7	SWE; 3	BAR; 2	LAT; 1					4th	94
2016	Albatec Racing	Peugeot 208	26	(United Kingdom) Andy Scott	BEL	NOR; 20	SWE; 10	BAR; 12	LAT; 13					16th	20
2016	Albatec Racing	Peugeot 208	74	(France) Jérôme Grosset-Janin	BEL; 2	NOR; 5	SWE; 9	BAR; 4	LAT; 4					2nd	105
2017	Albatec-HTB Racing	Peugeot 208	24	(Norway) Tommy Rustad	BAR; 9	NOR; 6	SWE; 9	FRA; 6	LAT; 4					5th	86
2017	Albatec Racing	Peugeot 208	14	(Finland) Jere Kalliokoski	BAR; 15	NOR; 11	SWE; 10	FRA; 15	LAT; 15					13th	25
2017	Albatec Racing	Peugeot 208	121	(France) Philippe Maloigne	BAR; 19	NOR	SWE	FRA	LAT					30th	0

=== Complete FIA World Rallycross Championship results ===
(key)

==== Supercar ====
Year	Entrant	Car	No.	Driver	1	2	3	4	5	6	7	8	9	10	11	12	13	WRX	Points	Teams	Points
2014	Albatec Racing	Peugeot 208 GTi	2	(Republic of Ireland) Oliver O'Donovan	POR	GBR	NOR	FIN	SWE	BEL	CAN	FRA	GER	ITA	TUR	ARG; 11		37th	8	6th	25
2014	Albatec Racing	Peugeot 208 GTi	25	(Canada) Jacques Villeneuve	POR; 17	GBR	NOR; 15	FIN; 16	SWE; 17	BEL; 15	CAN; 16	FRA	GER	ITA; 16	TUR	ARG		37th	8	6th	25
2014	Albatec Racing	Peugeot 208 GTi	26	(United Kingdom) Andy Scott	POR; 13	GBR; 10	NOR	FIN	SWE	BEL; 21	CAN; 12	FRA; 12	GER; 31	ITA; 24	TUR; 11	ARG; 9		12th	46	6th	25
2014	Albatec Racing	Peugeot 208 GTi	27	(France) Davy Jeanney	POR	GBR; 25	NOR	FIN	SWE	BEL	CAN	FRA	GER	ITA	TUR	ARG		17th	27	6th	25
2014	Albatec Racing	Peugeot 208 GTi	47	(Sweden) Ramona Karlsson	POR	GBR	NOR	FIN	SWE	BEL	CAN	FRA	GER; 35	ITA	TUR	ARG		37th	8	6th	25
2014	Albatec Racing	Peugeot 208 GTi	81	(United Kingdom) David Binks	POR	GBR	NOR	FIN	SWE	BEL	CAN	FRA; 21	GER	ITA	TUR	ARG		56th	0	6th	25
2014	Albatec Racing	Peugeot 208 GTi	122	(United Kingdom) Marc Scott	POR	GBR	NOR	FIN	SWE	BEL	CAN	FRA	GER	ITA	TUR; 14	ARG		48th	3	6th	25
2015	Albatec Racing	Peugeot 208	26	(United Kingdom) Andy Scott	POR	HOC	BEL	GBR; 24	GER	SWE	CAN	NOR	FRA	BAR	TUR	ITA	ARG	40th	0	N/A	N/A
2015	Albatec Racing	Peugeot 208	74	(France) Jérôme Grosset-Janin	POR	HOC	BEL	GBR	GER	SWE	CAN	NOR	FRA; 14	BAR	TUR	ITA	ARG	30th	3	N/A	N/A
2015	Albatec Racing	Peugeot 208	81	(United Kingdom) David Binks	POR	HOC	BEL	GBR; 23	GER	SWE	CAN	NOR	FRA	BAR	TUR	ITA	ARG	38th	8	N/A	N/A
2015	Albatec Racing	Peugeot 208	146	(Finland) Kristian Sohlberg	POR	HOC	BEL	GBR	GER	SWE	CAN	NOR	FRA	BAR	TUR; 16	ITA	ARG	34th	1	N/A	N/A
2015	Albatec Racing	Peugeot 208	168	(France) Yvan Muller	POR	HOC	BEL	GBR	GER	SWE	CAN	NOR	FRA; 19	BAR	TUR	ITA	ARG	40th	0	N/A	N/A
2016	Albatec Racing	Peugeot 208	24	(Norway) Tommy Rustad	POR	HOC	BEL	GBR	NOR	SWE	CAN	FRA; 13	BAR	LAT	GER; 25†	ARG		22nd	4	N/A	N/A
2016	Albatec Racing	Peugeot 208	26	(United Kingdom) Andy Scott	POR	HOC	BEL	GBR	NOR	SWE	CAN	FRA; 12	BAR	LAT	GER	ARG		21st	6	N/A	N/A
2016	Albatec Racing	Peugeot 208	121	(France) Philippe Maloigne	POR	HOC	BEL	GBR	NOR	SWE	CAN	FRA; 21	BAR	LAT	GER	ARG		37th	0	N/A	N/A
2017	Albatec Racing	Peugeot 208	67	(Belgium) François Duval	BAR	POR	HOC	BEL; 15	GBR	NOR	SWE	CAN	FRA	LAT	GER	RSA		22nd	2	N/A	N/A
2017	Albatec Racing	Peugeot 208	124	(South Africa) Mark Cronje	BAR	POR	HOC	BEL	GBR	NOR	SWE	CAN	FRA	LAT	GER	RSA; 20		35th	0	N/A	N/A

† Points scored with other team(s).
