= Jérôme Grosset-Janin =

French rallycross driver

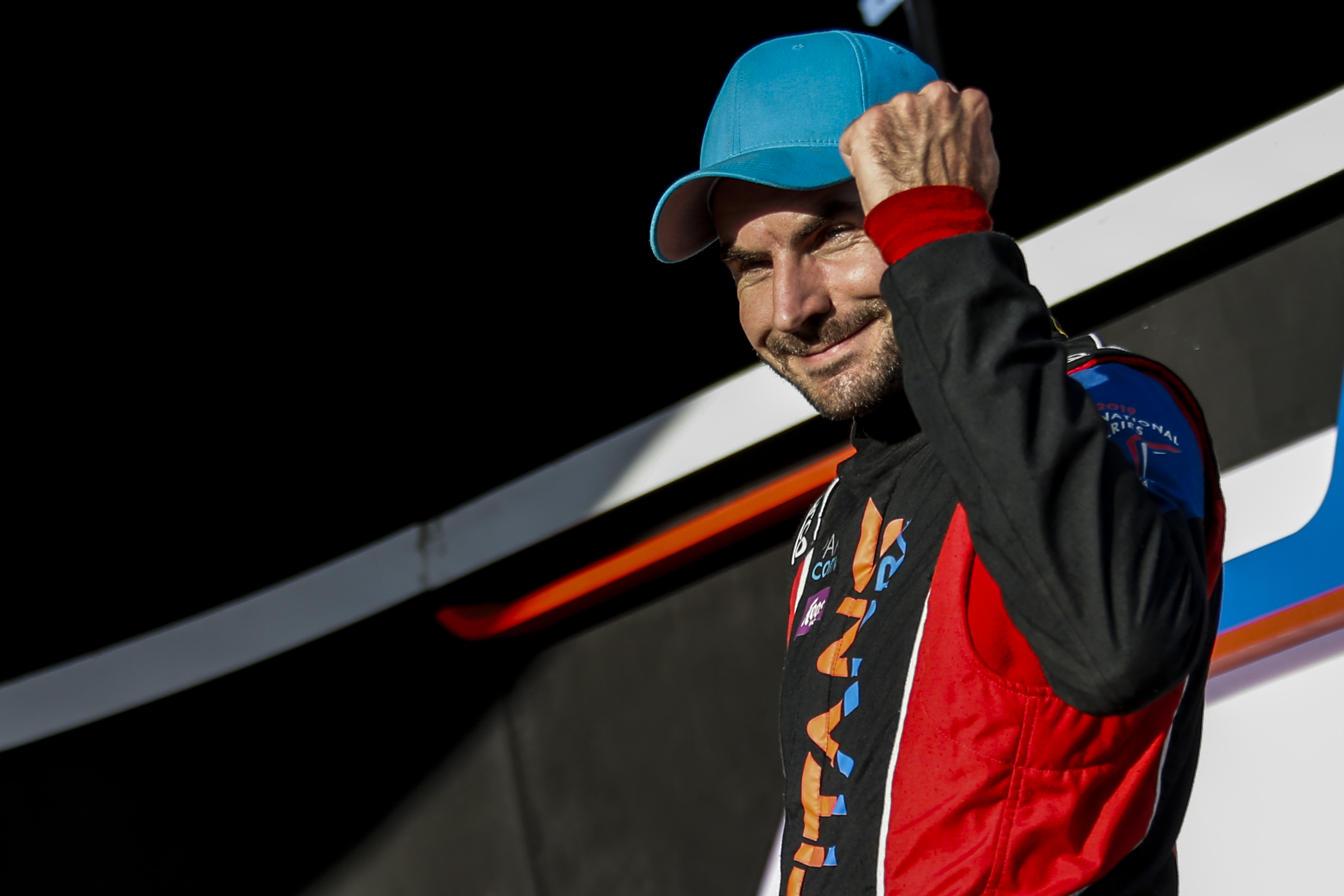
- Grosset-Janin victory at 2019 TitansRX Estering, Germany
- Born: 19 June 1984 (age 42); Sallanches, France

Rallycross career
- Debut season: 2019
- Current team: TitansRX

FIA World Rallycross Championship
- Car number: 74
- Former teams: Albatec Racing & GC Kompetition
- Starts: 13
- Wins: 0
- Podiums: 1
- Best finish: 3rd in 2018
- Years active: 2012–2019
- Former teams: Albatec Racing; Jérôme Grosset-Janin
- Starts: 23
- Wins: 1
- Podiums: 4
- Best finish: 2nd in 2015, 2016

Previous series
- FIA ERX Supercar Championship

Jérôme Luc Ludovic Grosset-Janin (born 19 June 1984) is a French rallycross driver from Sallanches, Haute-Savoie.

== Biography ==
Grosset-Janin began his motorsport career in ice racing in 2003, and competed in the 2005 Andros Trophy, where he secured 14 podiums from 14 races. The following year, at age 22, he switched to rallying in the French Asphalt Rally Championship, finishing third to become the youngest driver to win a rally and reach the podium.

In 2009, Grosset-Janin returned to rallycross, finishing third in the French Rallycross Championship in 2010 and 2011. In 2012, he finished runner-up and in 2013 he was crowned French Rallycross Champion. In 2014, he piloted a Clio in the British round of the FIA European Rallycross Championship and finished sixth overall in the heats. In 2015, he raced a full-time campaign in the European Rallycross Championship with Albatec Racing, winning in Belgium on his way to second in the championship behind Tommy Rustad.

Grosset-Janin raced in the World Rallycross Championship for GC Kompetition behind the wheel of a Renault Megane RX. He took his first podium in Sweden 2018.

For the 2019 season, Grosset-Janin entered the TitansRX championship at the wheel of the single-design PanteraRX6 Supercar. He took first place in 2019 TitansRX in Estering, Germany.

This past year, Grosset-Janin has been working alongside Mercedes Benz Etoile Mont Blanc as an ambassador.

== Racing record ==
=== Complete FIA European Rallycross Championship results ===
==== Division 1 ====
Year	Entrant	Car	1	2	3	4	5	6	7	8	9 10	ERX	Points	
2005	Jérôme Grosset-Janin	Citroën Xsara T16 4x4	FRA; 14	POR	AUT	CZE	NOR	SWE	BEL	NED	POL	GER	40th	3
2010	Jérôme Grosset-Janin	Citroën C4 T16 4x4	POR	FRA; 8	GBR	HUN	SWE	FIN	BEL	GER	POL	CZE	27th	9

==== Supercar ====
Year	Entrant	Car	1	2	3	4	5	6	7	8	9	10	ERX	Points
2012	Jérôme Grosset-Janin	Renault Clio	GBR	FRA; 6	AUT	HUN	NOR	SWE	BEL; 5	NED	FIN	GER	18th	23
2013	Jérôme Grosset-Janin	Renault Clio	GBR	POR	HUN	FIN	NOR	SWE	FRA; 17	AUT	GER		45th	0
2014	Jérôme Grosset-Janin	Renault Clio	GBR; 2	NOR; 15	BEL; 9	GER; 9	ITA; 21						7th	33
2015	Albatec Racing	Peugeot 208	BEL; 1	GER; 2	NOR; 4	BAR; 5	ITA; 5						2nd	117
2016	Albatec Racing	Peugeot 208	BEL; 2	NOR; 5	SWE; 9	BAR; 4	LAT; 4						2nd	105
2017	Hervé "Knapick" Lemonnier	Citroën DS3	BAR; 11	NOR; 8	SWE; 18	FRA; 10	LAT; 7						9th	45

=== Complete FIA World Rallycross Championship results ===
==== Supercar ====
Year	Entrant	Car	1	2	3	4	5	6	7	8	9	10	11	12	13	WRX	Points
2014	Jérôme Grosset-Janin	Renault Clio	POR	GBR; 8	NOR; 24	FIN	SWE	BEL; 17	CAN	FRA; 7	GER	ITA; 31	TUR	ARG		17th	27
2015	Albatec Racing	Peugeot 208	POR	HOC	BEL	GBR	GER	SWE	CAN	NOR	FRA; 14	BAR	TUR	ITA	ARG	29th	3
2018	GC Kompetition	Renault Mégane RS	BAR; 11	POR; 14	BEL; 14	GBR; 10	NOR; 14	SWE; 3	CAN; 12	FRA	LAT	USA	GER	RSA		11th	47
