= 2015 World RX of Norway =

Rallycross event

- Round 8 of 13 in the 2015 FIA World Rallycross Championship
- Date: 22-23 August 2015
- Location: Hell, Nord-Trøndelag
- Venue: Lånkebanen

Results
Heat winners
- Heat 1: (Norway) Petter Solberg; SDRX
- Heat 2: (Sweden) Timmy Hansen; Team Peugeot-Hansen
- Heat 3: (Sweden) Timmy Hansen; Team Peugeot-Hansen
- Heat 4: (Norway) Petter Solberg; SDRX
Semi-final winners
- Semi-final 1: (Sweden) Timmy Hansen; Team Peugeot-Hansen
- Semi-final 2: (Sweden) Per-Gunnar Andersson; Marklund Motorsport
Final
- First: (Sweden) Timmy Hansen; Team Peugeot-Hansen
- Second: (France) Davy Jeanney; Team Peugeot-Hansen
- Third: (Sweden) Robin Larsson; Larsson Jernberg Racing Team

World RX layout of Lånkebanen

The 2015 World RX of Norway (formally the 2015 NAF World RX of Norway) was the eighth round of the second season of the FIA World Rallycross Championship. The event was held at the Lånkebanen in Hell, Nord-Trøndelag.

== Heats ==
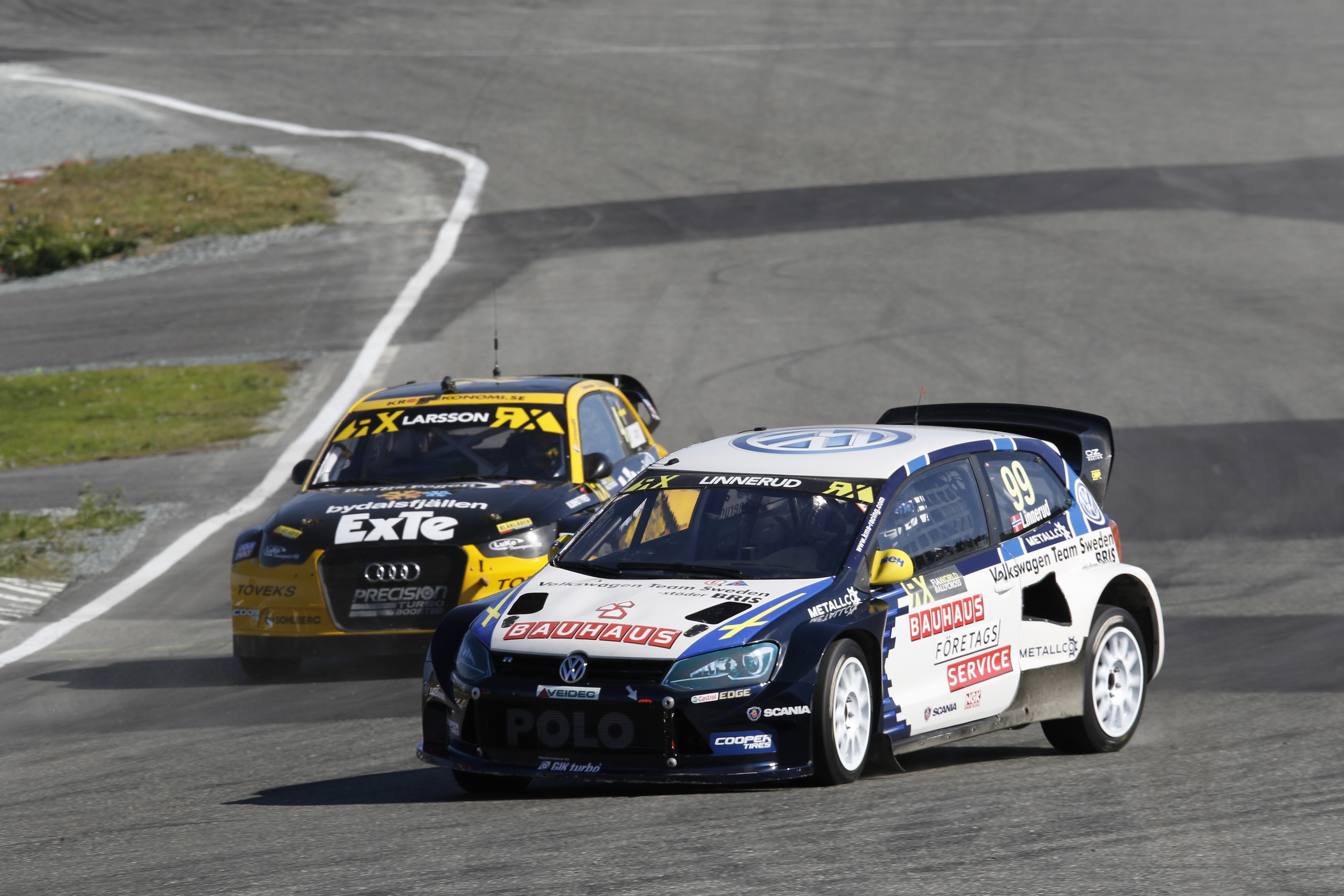
Tord Linnerud and Robin Larsson

World Championship classification
Pos.	No.	Driver	Team	Car	H1	H2	H3	H4	Pts
1	21	(Sweden) Timmy Hansen	Team Peugeot-Hansen	Peugeot 208	3rd	1st	1st	2nd	16
2	1	(Norway) Petter Solberg	SDRX	Citroën DS3	1st	23rd	4th	1st	15
3	17	(France) Davy Jeanney	Team Peugeot-Hansen	Peugeot 208	2nd	2nd	11th	7th	14
4	42	(Russia) Timur Timerzyanov	Namus OMSE	Ford Fiesta ST	6th	3rd	5th	5th	13
5	92	(Sweden) Anton Marklund	EKS RX	Audi S1	7th	6th	3rd	8th	12
6	3	(Sweden) Johan Kristoffersson	Volkswagen Team Sweden	Volkswagen Polo	5th	8th	9th	11th	11
7	15	(Latvia) Reinis Nitišs	Olsbergs MSE	Ford Fiesta ST	9th	5th	8th	15th	10
8	13	(Norway) Andreas Bakkerud	Olsbergs MSE	Ford Fiesta ST	22nd	4th	13th	3rd	9
9	4	(Sweden) Robin Larsson	Larsson Jernberg Racing Team	Audi A1	11th	11th	7th	13th	8
10	10	(Sweden) Mattias Ekström	EKS RX	Audi S1	23rd	22nd	2nd	4th	7
11	88	(Norway) Henning Solberg	Olsbergs MSE	Ford Fiesta ST	10th	10th	14th	16th	6
12	55	(Sweden) Alx Danielsson	All-Inkl.com Münnich Motorsport	Audi S3	8th	15th	15th	14th	5
13	45	(Sweden) Per-Gunnar Andersson	Marklund Motorsport	Volkswagen Polo	37th	7th	6th	6th	4
14	7	(Austria) Manfred Stohl	World RX Team Austria	Ford Fiesta	18th	9th	20th	10th	3
15	99	(Norway) Tord Linnerud	Volkswagen Team Sweden	Volkswagen Polo	14th	16th	16th	12th	2
16	28	(Norway) Alexander Hvaal	JC Raceteknik	Citroën DS3	16th	12th	18th	27th	1
17	46	(Sweden) Mats Öhman	Mats Öhman	Volvo S40	26th	18th	23rd	21st	
18	33	(United Kingdom) Liam Doran	SDRX	Citroën DS3	20th	25th	21st	28th	
19	57	(Finland) Toomas Heikkinen	Marklund Motorsport	Volkswagen Polo	40th	17th	10th	31st	
20	53	(Norway) Daniel Holten	Eklund Motorsport	Volkswagen Beetle	41st	31st	29th	22nd	
21	77	(Germany) René Münnich	All-Inkl.com Münnich Motorsport	Audi S3	17th	39th	33rd	39th	
22	31	(Austria) Max Pucher	World RX Team Austria	Ford Fiesta	30th	36th	42nd	30th	
23	70	(Austria) Christoph Brugger	World RX Team Austria	Ford Fiesta	29th	41st	38th	34th	
24	30	(Norway) Ole Kristian Temte	Ole Kristian Temte	Citroën C4	43rd	43rd	36th	36th	
European Championship classification
1	24	(Norway) Tommy Rustad	HTB Racing-Marklund Motorsport	Volkswagen Polo	4th	14th	12th	9th	16
2	87	(France) Jean-Baptiste Dubourg	Jean-Baptiste Dubourg	Citroën C4	21st	13th	19th	17th	15
3	199	(Latvia) Jānis Baumanis	Hansen Talent Development	Peugeot 208	12th	21st	26th	20th	14
4	74	(France) Jérôme Grosset-Janin	Albatec Racing	Peugeot 208	13th	24th	22nd	23rd	13
5	8	(Sweden) Peter Hedström	Hedströms Motorsport	Ford Fiesta	24th	20th	24th	19th	12
6	60	(Finland) Joni-Pekka Rajala	Eklund Motorsport	Saab 9-3	19th	19th	37th	26th	11
7	14	(Norway) Frode Holte	Frode Holte Motorsport	Hyundai i20	DNF	26th	17th	18th	10
8	61	(Norway) Stein Egil Jenssen	Stein Egil Jenssen	Ford Fiesta	35th	30th	25th	25th	9
9	27	(United Kingdom) James Grint	Albatec Racing	Peugeot 208	28th	29th	32nd	29th	8
10	2	(Republic of Ireland) Oliver O'Donovan	Oliver O'Donovan	Ford Fiesta	32nd	27th	28th	33rd	7
11	58	(Norway) Stian Hafsengen	Stian Hafsengen	Renault Clio	25th	37th	27th	37th	6
12	22	(Belgium) Koen Pauwels	Koen Pauwels	Ford Fiesta	33rd	33rd	35th	32nd	5
13	48	(Sweden) Lukas Walfridsson	Helmia Motorsport	Renault Clio	DNF	35th	31st	24th	4
14	59	(Norway) Morten Bergminrud	Morten Bergminrud	Ford Fiesta	34th	34th	34th	35th	3
15	63	(Norway) Svein Frustol	CircleX	Ford Fiesta	31st	28th	DNF	DNS	2
16	12	(Finland) Riku Tahko	ST Motorsport	BMW MINI Countryman	27th	DNF	39th	DNS	1
17	47	(Sweden) Ramona Karlsson	Ramona RX	Volkswagen Scirocco	36th	32nd	DNF	DNF	
18	52	(Norway) Ole Christian Veiby	Volkswagen Team Sweden	Volkswagen Polo	15th	DNF	DNS	DNS	
19	73	(Norway) Pål Try	CircleX	Volvo C30	DNF	DNF	30th	DNF	
20	35	(Norway) Ole Håbjørg	Ole Håbjørg	Renault Clio	DNS	DNS	DNS	DNS	

== Semi-finals ==
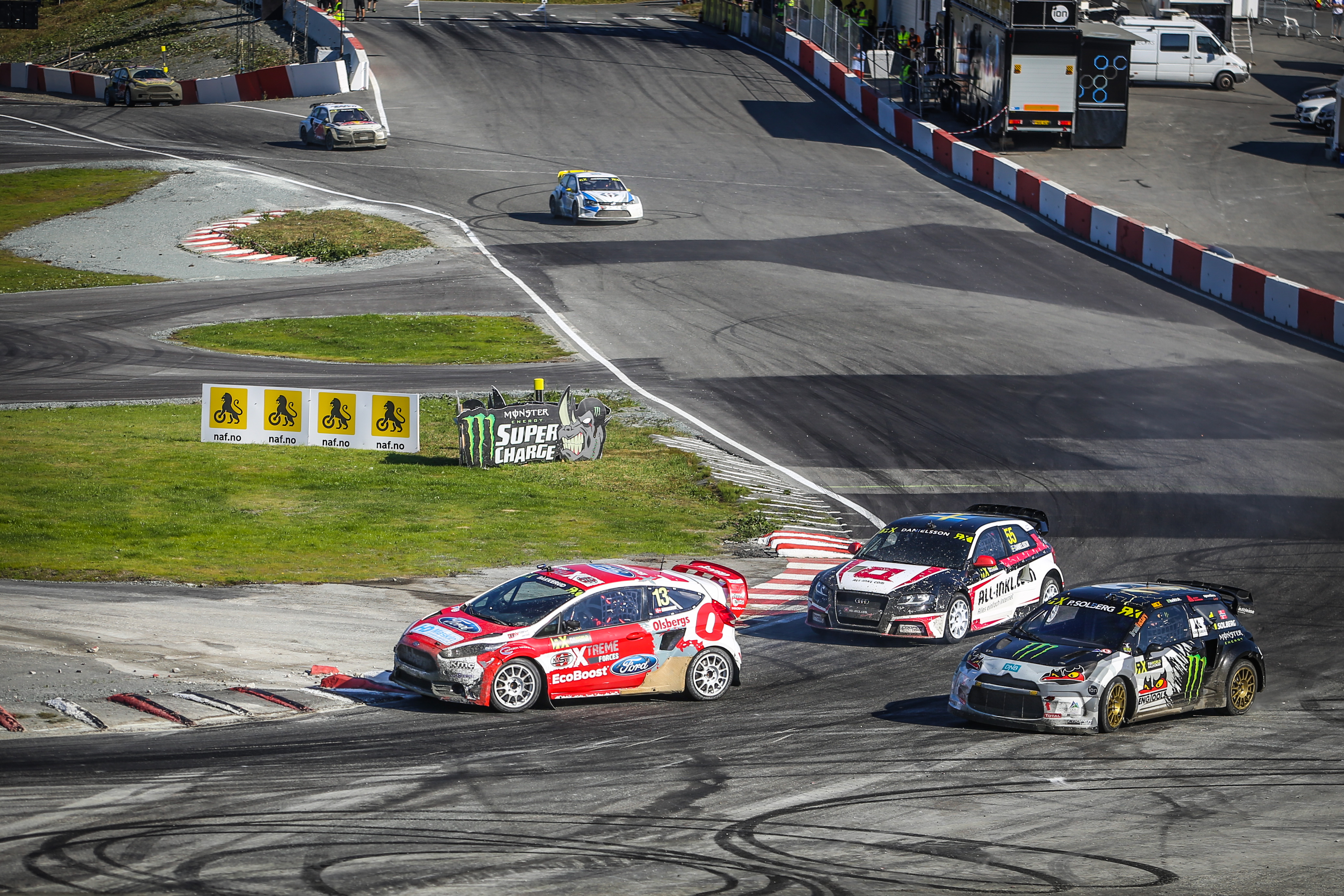
The second World Championship semi-final

=== World Championship ===
==== Semi-final 1 ====
Pos.	No.	Driver	Team	Time	Pts
1	21	(Sweden) Timmy Hansen	Team Peugeot-Hansen	4:02.959	6
2	17	(France) Davy Jeanney	Team Peugeot-Hansen	+3.211	5
3	4	(Sweden) Robin Larsson	Larsson Jernberg Racing Team	+6.172	4
4	15	(Latvia) Reinis Nitišs	Olsbergs MSE	+7.175	3
5	92	(Sweden) Anton Marklund	EKS RX	+7.855	2
6	88	(Norway) Henning Solberg	Olsbergs MSE	+17.029	1

==== Semi-final 2 ====
Pos.	No.	Driver	Team	Time	Pts
1	45	(Sweden) Per-Gunnar Andersson	Marklund Motorsport	4:06.216	6
2	55	(Sweden) Alx Danielsson	All-Inkl.com Münnich Motorsport	+1.804	5
3	42	(Russia) Timur Timerzyanov	Namus OMSE	+17.812	4
4	10	(Sweden) Mattias Ekström	EKS RX	+35.823	3
5	1	(Norway) Petter Solberg	SDRX	+49.984	2
6	13	(Norway) Andreas Bakkerud	Olsbergs MSE	DNF	1

=== European Championship ===
==== Semi-final 1 ====
Pos.	No.	Driver	Team	Time	Pts
1	24	(Norway) Tommy Rustad	HTB Racing-Marklund Motorsport	3:58.945	6
2	199	(Latvia) Jānis Baumanis	Hansen Talent Development	+2.315	5
3	14	(Norway) Frode Holte	Frode Holte Motorsport	+6.196	4
4	8	(Sweden) Peter Hedström	Hedströms Motorsport	+7.243	3
5	27	(United Kingdom) James Grint	Albatec Racing	+14.149	2
6	58	(Norway) Stian Hafsengen	Stian Hafsengen	DNF	1

==== Semi-final 2 ====
Pos.	No.	Driver	Team	Time	Pts
1	74	(France) Jérôme Grosset-Janin	Albatec Racing	4:05.949	6
2	60	(Finland) Joni-Pekka Rajala	Eklund Motorsport	+1.767	5
3	2	(Republic of Ireland) Oliver O'Donovan	Oliver O'Donovan	+2.873	4
4	22	(Belgium) Koen Pauwels	Koen Pauwels	+11.209	3
5	61	(Norway) Stein Egil Jenssen	Stein Egil Jenssen	DNF	2
6	87	(France) Jean-Baptiste Dubourg	Jean-Baptiste Dubourg	DNS	1

== Finals ==
=== World Championship ===
Pos.	No.	Driver	Team	Time	Pts
1	21	(Sweden) Timmy Hansen	Team Peugeot-Hansen	4:02.645	8
2	17	(France) Davy Jeanney	Team Peugeot-Hansen	+3.675	5
3	4	(Sweden) Robin Larsson	Larsson Jernberg Racing Team	+6.527	4
4	55	(Sweden) Alx Danielsson	All-Inkl.com Münnich Motorsport	+7.782	3
5	45	(Sweden) Per-Gunnar Andersson	Marklund Motorsport	+15.629	2
6	42	(Russia) Timur Timerzyanov	Namus OMSE	DNF	1

=== European Championship ===
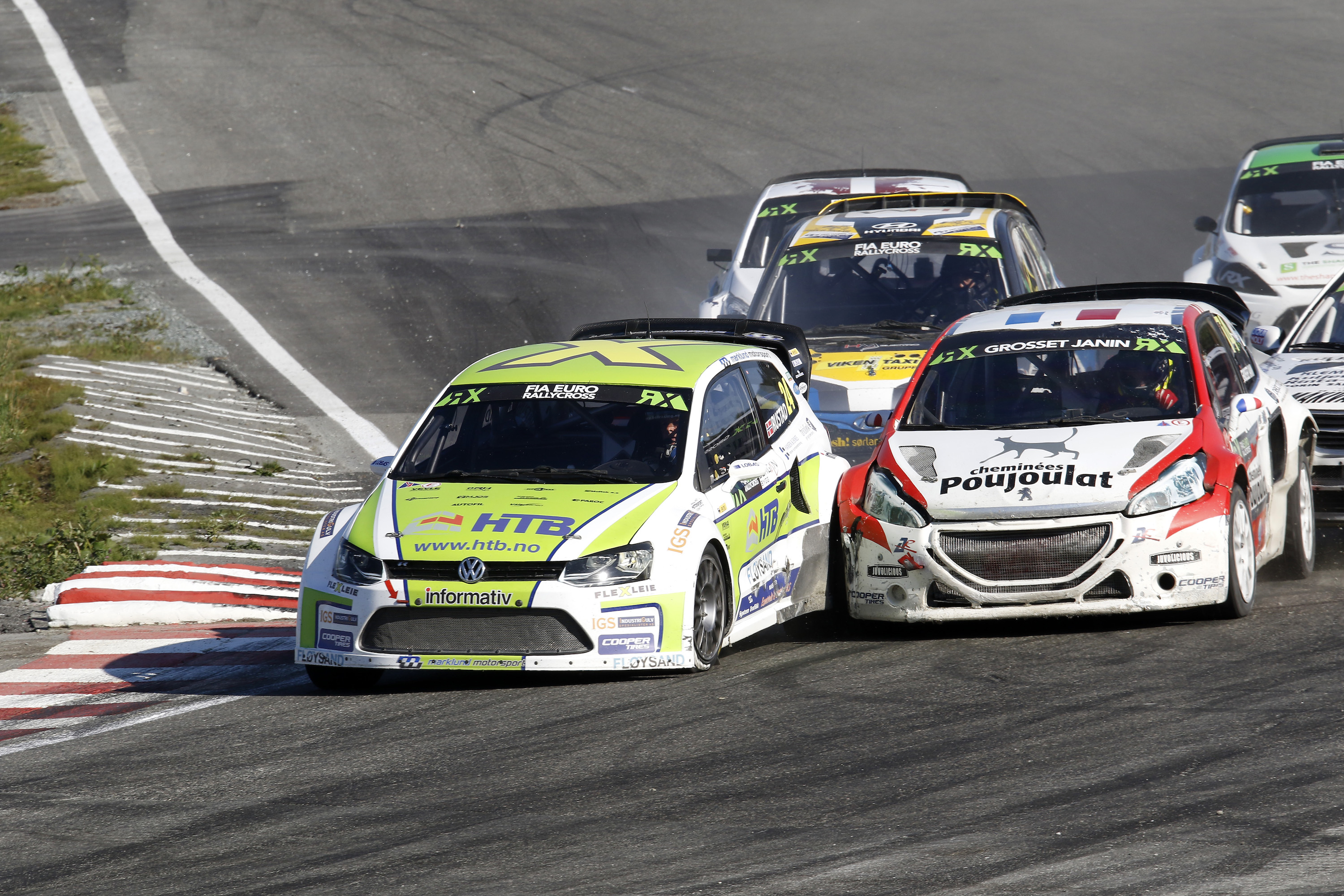
European Championship final

Pos.	No.	Driver	Team	Time	Pts
1	24	(Norway) Tommy Rustad	HTB Racing-Marklund Motorsport	4:02.926	8
2	60	(Finland) Joni-Pekka Rajala	Eklund Motorsport	+4.825	5
3	199	(Latvia) Jānis Baumanis	Hansen Talent Development	+5.061	4
4	74	(France) Jérôme Grosset-Janin	Albatec Racing	+6.250	3
5	2	(Republic of Ireland) Oliver O'Donovan	Oliver O'Donovan	+7.741	2
6	14	(Norway) Frode Holte	Frode Holte Motorsport	+11.460	1

== Standings after the event ==
World Championship standings

Pos	Driver	Pts
1	(Norway) Petter Solberg	193
2	(Sweden) Timmy Hansen	152
3	(Norway) Andreas Bakkerud	140
4	(France) Davy Jeanney	139
5	(Sweden) Johan Kristoffersson	135

European Championship standings

Pos	Driver	Pts
1	(Norway) Tommy Rustad	83
2	(France) Jérôme Grosset-Janin	77
3	(Finland) Joni-Pekka Rajala	53
4	(Norway) Frode Holte	45
5	(Norway) Ole Christian Veiby	40

- Note: Only the top five positions are included for both sets of standings.

Previous race: 2015 World RX of Canada	FIA World Rallycross Championship; 2015 season	Next race: 2015 World RX of France
Previous race: 2014 World RX of Norway	World RX of Norway	Next race: 2016 World RX of Norway
