= 2014 World RX of Italy =

Rallycross event

- Round 10 of 12 in the 2014 FIA World Rallycross Championship
- Date: 27–28 September 2014
- Location: Franciacorta, Lombardy
- Venue: Franciacorta International Circuit

Results
Heat winners
- Heat 1: (Sweden) Timmy Hansen; Team Peugeot-Hansen
- Heat 2: (Sweden) Johan Kristoffersson; Volkswagen Dealer Team KMS
- Heat 3: (Norway) Petter Solberg; PSRX
- Heat 4: (Sweden) Timmy Hansen; Team Peugeot-Hansen
Semi-final winners
- Semi-final 1: (Sweden) Timmy Hansen; Team Peugeot-Hansen
- Semi-final 2: (Russia) Timur Timerzyanov; Team Peugeot-Hansen
Final
- First: (Sweden) Timmy Hansen; Team Peugeot-Hansen
- Second: (Sweden) Richard Göransson; Olsbergs MSE
- Third: (Norway) Petter Solberg; PSRX

The 2014 World RX of Italy was the 10th round of the inaugural season of the FIA World Rallycross Championship. The event was held at the Franciacorta International Circuit in Franciacorta, Lombardy. It was a significant round as Petter Solberg scored enough points with his 3rd-place finish to wrap up the 2014 drivers' championship with 2 rounds to go, making him the first person to win two FIA-sanctioned World Championships, having won the 2003 World Rally Championship.

== Heats ==
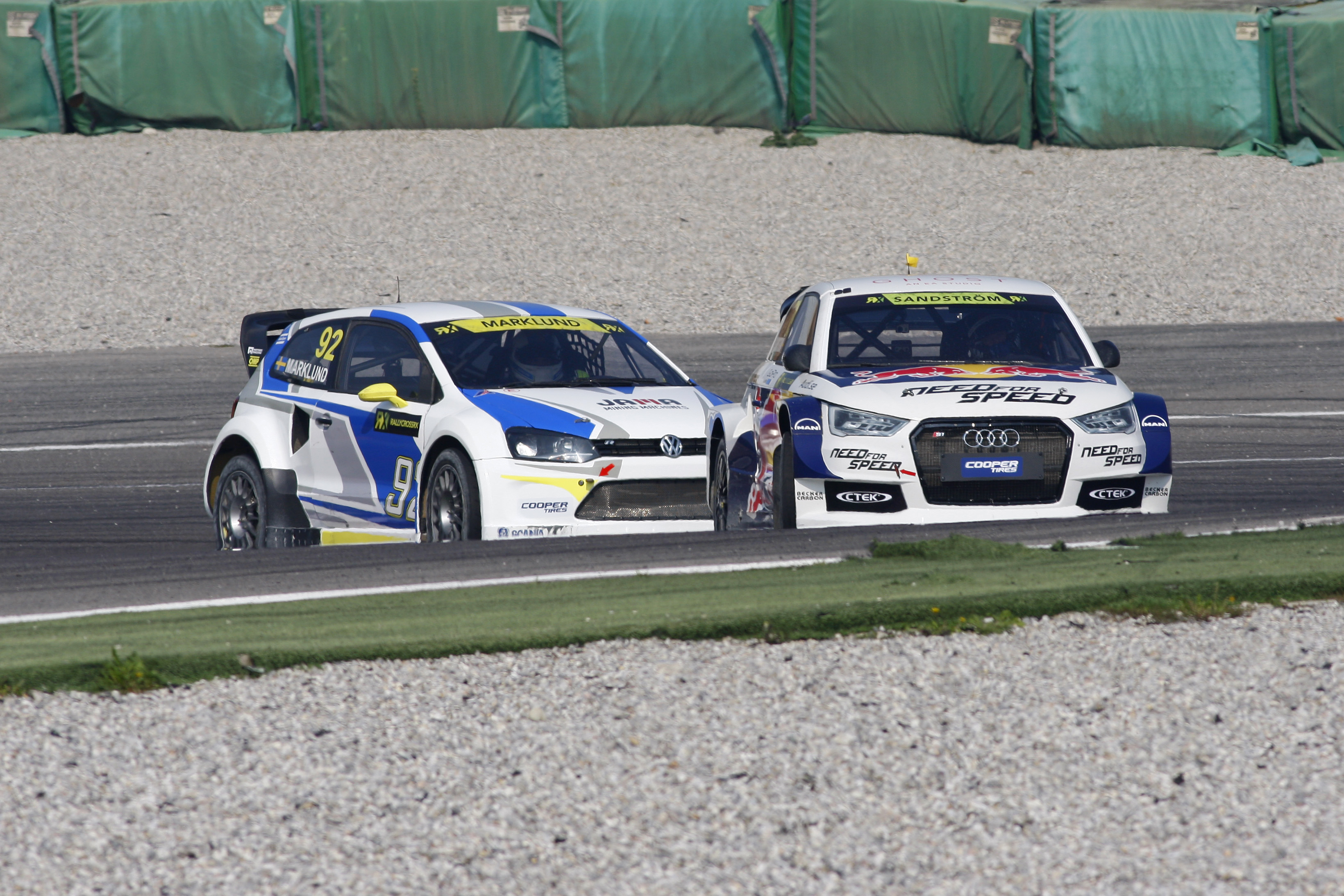
Edward Sandström and Anton Marklund

Pos.	No.	Driver	Team	Car	H1	H2	H3	H4	Pts
1	3	(Sweden) Timmy Hansen	Team Peugeot-Hansen	Peugeot 208 T16	1st	4th	2nd	1st	16
2	53	(Sweden) Johan Kristoffersson	Volkswagen Dealer Team KMS	Volkswagen Polo	2nd	1st	5th	10th	15
3	11	(Norway) Petter Solberg	PSRX	Citroën DS3	9th	10th	1st	2nd	14
4	92	(Sweden) Anton Marklund	Marklund Motorsport	Volkswagen Polo	4th	2nd	10th	4th	13
5	57	(Finland) Toomas Heikkinen	Marklund Motorsport	Volkswagen Polo	7th	3rd	6th	5th	12
6	1	(Russia) Timur Timerzyanov	Team Peugeot-Hansen	Peugeot 208 T16	6th	15th	4th	8th	11
7	4	(Sweden) Robin Larsson	Larsson Jernberg Motorsport	Audi A1	5th	11th	13th	9th	10
8	88	(Norway) Henning Solberg	Monster Energy World RX	Citroën DS3	17th	6th	3rd	13th	9
9	111	(Sweden) Richard Göransson	Olsbergs MSE	Ford Fiesta ST	22nd	8th	9th	11th	8
10	15	(Latvia) Reinis Nitišs	Olsbergs MSE	Ford Fiesta ST	3rd	7th	29th	16th	7
11	125	(Italy) Gigi Galli	Olsbergs MSE	Ford Fiesta ST	8th	13th	8th	25th	6
12	13	(Norway) Andreas Bakkerud	Olsbergs MSE	Ford Fiesta ST	28th	9th	17th	3rd	5
13	5	(Sweden) Pontus Tidemand	EKS RX	Audi S1	36th	5th	7th	7th	4
14	24	(Norway) Tommy Rustad	HTB Racing	Volvo C30	10th	28th	14th	14th	3
15	27	(France) Davy Jeanney	Monster Energy World RX	Citroën DS3	11th	16th	20th	20th	2
16	7	(Sweden) Emil Öhman	Öhman Racing	Citroën DS3	15th	24th	11th	19th	1
17	6	(France) Alexandre Theuil	Alexandre Theuil	Citroën DS3	13th	20th	16th	24th	
18	25	(Canada) Jacques Villeneuve	Albatec Racing	Peugeot 208	18th	35th	15th	6th	
19	105	(Sweden) Linus Westman	Eklund Motorsport	Saab 9-3	25th	14th	18th	17th	
20	79	(Sweden) Edward Sandström	EKS RX	Audi S1	30th	22nd	12th	12th	
21	99	(Norway) Tord Linnerud	Helmia Motorsport	Renault Clio	12th	18th	21st	26th	
22	30	(Norway) Morten Bermingrud	Morten Bermingrud	Citroën C4	14th	17th	33rd	15th	
23	8	(Sweden) Peter Hedström	Hedströms Motorsport	Škoda Fabia	16th	23rd	19th	23rd	
24	26	(United Kingdom) Andy Scott	Albatec Racing	Peugeot 208	19th	21st	28th	21st	
25	49	(Germany) René Münnich	All-Inkl.com Münnich Motorsport	Audi S3	21st	19th	31st	22nd	
26	37	(Czech Republic) Pavel Koutný	Czech National Team	Ford Fiesta	24th	29th	25th	27th	
27	66	(Republic of Ireland) Derek Tohill	LD Motorsports World RX	Citroën DS3	20th	25th	23rd	31st	
28	102	(Hungary) Tamás Kárai	Racing-Com	Škoda Fabia	32nd	26th	34th	18th	
29	46	(Italy) Christian Giarolo	Christian Giarolo	Ford Focus	26th	30th	26th	28th	
30	95	(Italy) Simone Romagna	PSRX	Citroën DS3	29th	33rd	22nd	30th	
31	74	(France) Jérôme Grosset-Janin	Jérôme Grosset-Janin	Renault Clio	23rd	12th	35th	35th	
32	21	(Poland) Bohdan Ludwiczak	Now or Never	Ford Fiesta	31st	34th	32nd	29th	
33	104	(Hungary) Attila Mozer	Nyirad Motorsport	Škoda Fabia	27th	31st	30th	34th	
34	31	(Norway) Tore Kristoffersen	Tore Kristoffersen	Ford Fiesta	34th	27th	24th	32nd	
35	54	(Belgium) Jos Jansen	JJ Racing	Ford Focus	33rd	32nd	27th	33rd	
36	48	(Sweden) Lukas Walfridson	Helmia Motorsport	Renault Clio	35th	36th	36th	36th	
37	63	(Russia) Roman Stepanenko	TT Motorsport	Citroën C4	37th	37th	37th	37th	
38	103	(Italy) Erwin Untersalmberger	Erwin Untersalmberger	Ford Fiesta	38th	38th	38th	38th	

== Semi-finals ==
=== Semi-final 1 ===
Pos.	No.	Driver	Team	Time	Pts
1	3	(Sweden) Timmy Hansen	Team Peugeot-Hansen	4:55.935	6
2	11	(Norway) Petter Solberg	PSRX	+1.421	5
3	111	(Sweden) Richard Göransson	Olsbergs MSE	+5.238	4
4	125	(Italy) Gigi Galli	Olsbergs MSE	+8.499	3
5	57	(Finland) Toomas Heikkinen	Marklund Motorsport	+25.366	2
6	4	(Sweden) Robin Larsson	Larsson Jernberg Motorsport	+38.689	1

=== Semi-final 2 ===
Pos.	No.	Driver	Team	Time	Pts
1	1	(Russia) Timur Timerzyanov	Team Peugeot-Hansen	4:58.626	6
2	13	(Norway) Andreas Bakkerud	Olsbergs MSE	+0.320	5
3	53	(Sweden) Johan Kristoffersson	Volkswagen Dealer Team KMS	+1.049	4
4	88	(Norway) Henning Solberg	Monster Energy World RX	+3.069	3
5	15	(Latvia) Reinis Nitišs	Olsbergs MSE	+2.651	2
6	92	(Sweden) Anton Marklund	Marklund Motorsport	+54.243	1

== Final ==
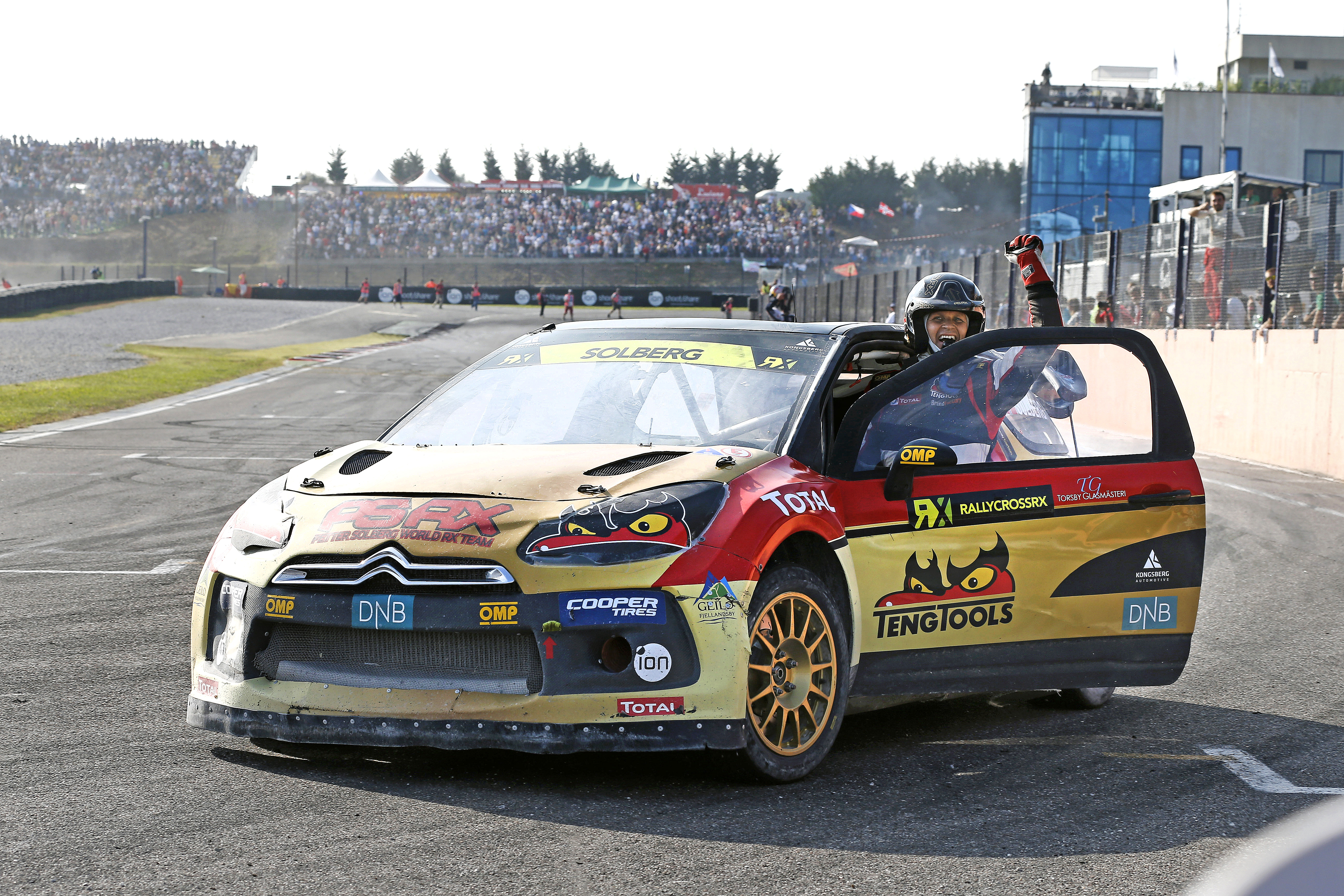
Petter Solberg celebrates winning the 2014 championship.

Pos.	No.	Driver	Team	Time	Pts
1	3	(Sweden) Timmy Hansen	Team Peugeot-Hansen	4:55.473	8
2	111	(Sweden) Richard Göransson	Olsbergs MSE	+6.361	5
3	11	(Norway) Petter Solberg	PSRX	+31.410	4
4	1	(Russia) Timur Timerzyanov	Team Peugeot-Hansen	+57.682	3
6	53	(Sweden) Johan Kristoffersson	Volkswagen Dealer Team KMS	DNF	2
6	13	(Norway) Andreas Bakkerud	Olsbergs MSE	DNF	1

== Championship standings after the event ==
Pos.	Driver	Points
WC	(Norway) Petter Solberg	235
2	(Finland) Toomas Heikkinen	175
3	(Latvia) Reinis Nitišs	167
4	(Sweden) Timmy Hansen	152
5	(Russia) Timur Timerzyanov	148

Previous race: 2014 World RX of Germany	FIA World Rallycross Championship; 2014 season	Next race: 2014 World RX of Turkey
Previous race: None	World RX of Italy	Next race: 2015 World RX of Italy
