= 2014 World RX of Germany =

Rallycross event

- Round 9 of 12 in the 2014 FIA World Rallycross Championship
- Date: 23–24 September 2014
- Location: Buxtehude, Lower Saxony
- Venue: Estering

Results
Heat winners
- Heat 1: (Sweden) Robin Larsson; Larsson Jernberg Motorsport
- Heat 2: (Sweden) Mattias Ekström; EKS RX
- Heat 3: (Norway) Andreas Bakkerud; Olsbergs MSE
- Heat 4: (Sweden) Johan Kristoffersson; Volkswagen Dealer Team KMS
Semi-final winners
- Semi-final 1: (Norway) Petter Solberg; PSRX
- Semi-final 2: (Sweden) Robin Larsson; Larsson Jernberg Motorsport
Final
- First: (Norway) Petter Solberg; PSRX
- Second: (Sweden) Mattias Ekström; EKS RX
- Third: (Sweden) Robin Larsson; Larsson Jernberg Motorsport

World RX layout of Estering

The 2014 World RX of Germany was the ninth round of the inaugural season of the FIA World Rallycross Championship. The event was held at the Estering in Buxtehude, Lower Saxony.

The event holds two World Championship records - it features the most entrants in an event (41), as well as the smallest margin of victory with Citroën driver Petter Solberg of Norway beating Audi driver Mattias Ekström of Sweden by five thousands of a second in the final.

== Heats ==
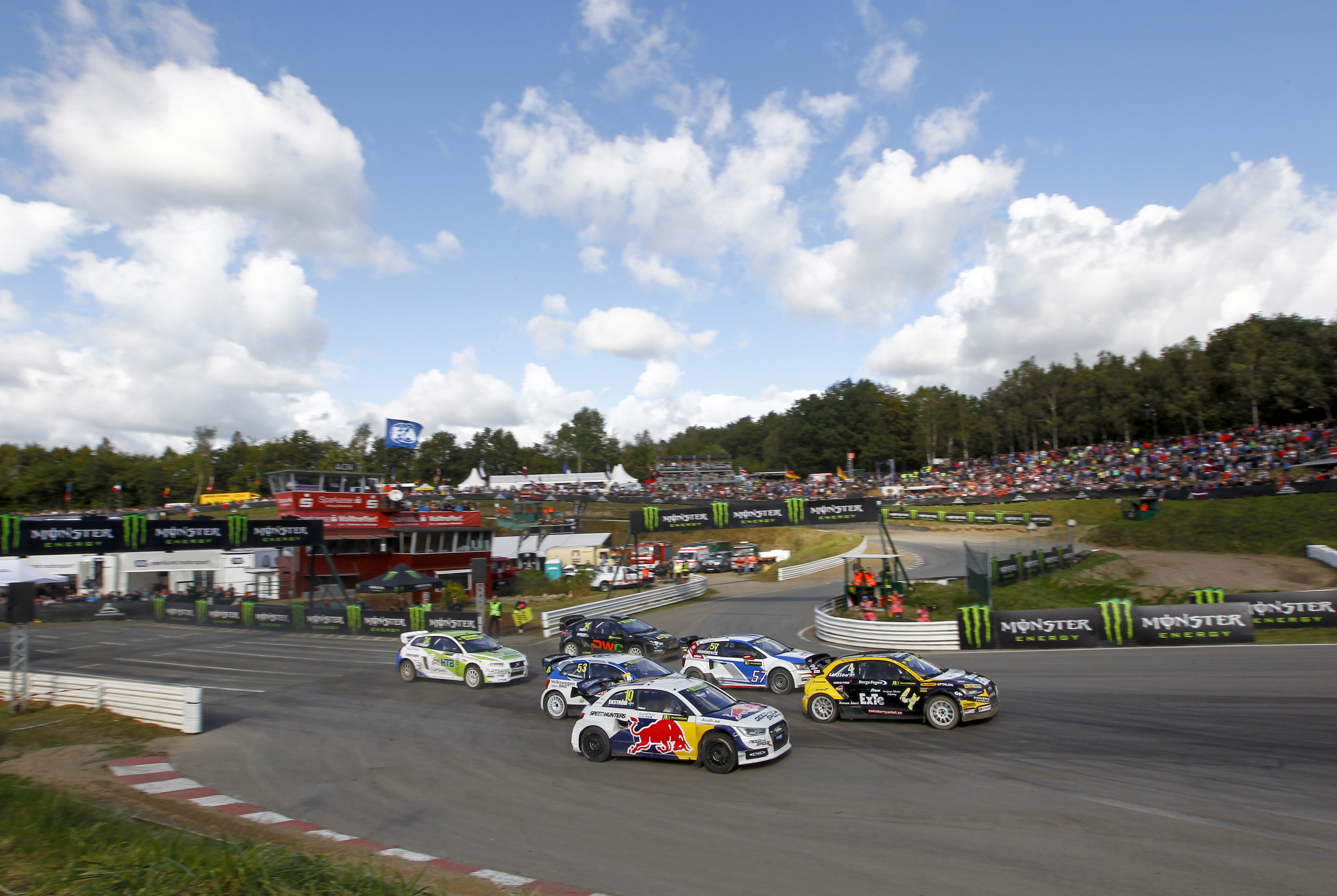
Larsson, Ekström, Heikkinen, Kristoffersson, Holte and Rustad

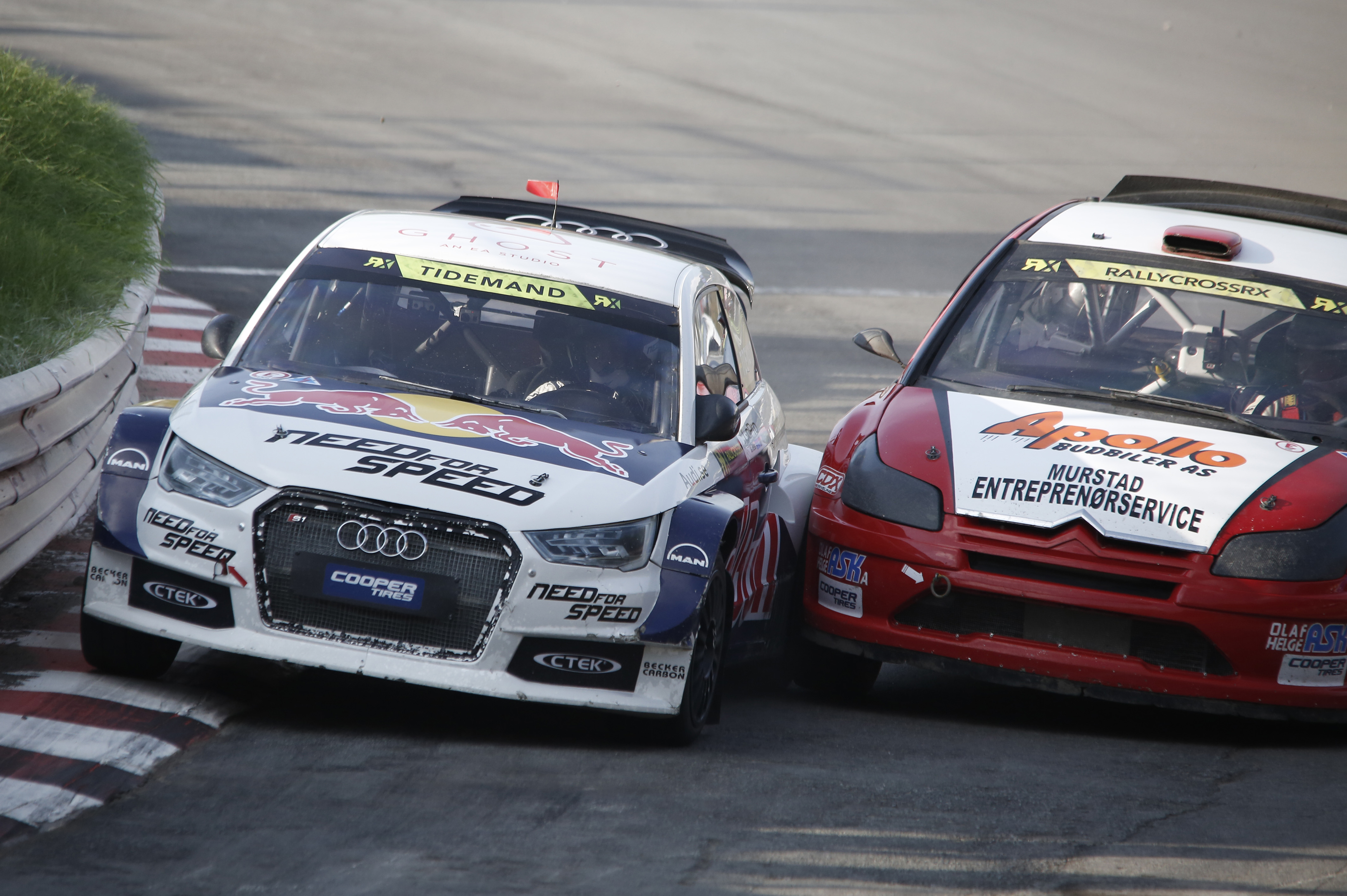
Pontus Tidemand and Morten Bergminrud

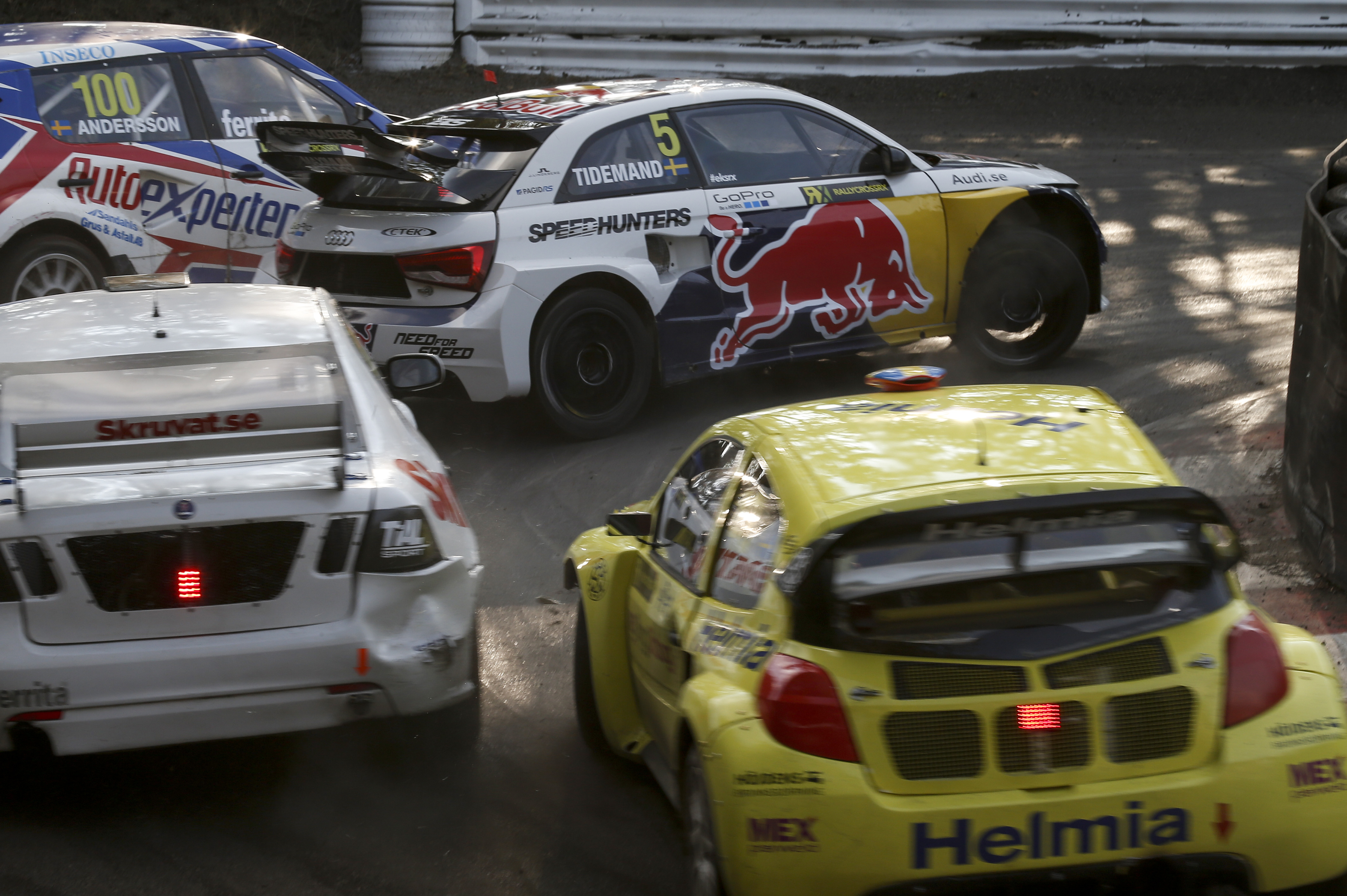
Tidemand, PG Andersson, Per Eklund and Lukas Walfridson

Pos.	No.	Driver	Team	Car	H1	H2	H3	H4	Pts
1	1	(Russia) Timur Timerzyanov	Team Peugeot-Hansen	Peugeot 208 T16	4th	2nd	5th	6th	16
2	10	(Sweden) Mattias Ekström	EKS RX	Audi S1	12th	1st	2nd	10th	15
3	3	(Sweden) Timmy Hansen	Team Peugeot-Hansen	Peugeot 208 T16	10th	8th	3rd	5th	14
4	4	(Sweden) Robin Larsson	Larsson Jernberg Motorsport	Audi A1	1st	25th	4th	9th	13
5	11	(Norway) Petter Solberg	PSRX	Citroën DS3	2nd	3rd	32nd	3rd	12
6	53	(Sweden) Johan Kristoffersson	Volkswagen Dealer Team KMS	Volkswagen Polo	8th	15th	24th	1st	11
7	5	(Sweden) Pontus Tidemand	EKS RX	Audi S1	16th	6th	26th	2nd	10
8	57	(Finland) Toomas Heikkinen	Marklund Motorsport	Volkswagen Polo	6th	10th	8th	28th	9
9	8	(Sweden) Peter Hedström	Hedströms Motorsport	Škoda Fabia	9th	13th	7th	24th	8
10	24	(Norway) Tommy Rustad	HTB Racing	Volvo C30	7th	5th	31st	11th	7
11	13	(Norway) Andreas Bakkerud	Olsbergs MSE	Ford Fiesta ST	40th	12th	1st	8th	6
12	14	(Norway) Frode Holte	Frode Holte Motorsport	Ford Focus	11th	7th	35th	7th	5
13	100	(Sweden) Per-Gunnar Andersson	Per-Gunnar Andersson	Škoda Fabia	19th	9th	9th	23rd	4
14	74	(France) Jérôme Grosset-Janin	Jérôme Grosset-Janin	Renault Clio	14th	16th	27th	4th	3
15	88	(Norway) Henning Solberg	Monster Energy World RX	Citroën DS3	3rd	11th	6th	33rd	2
16	15	(Latvia) Reinis Nitišs	Olsbergs MSE	Ford Fiesta ST	5th	14th	33rd	17th	1
17	92	(Sweden) Anton Marklund	Marklund Motorsport	Volkswagen Polo	32nd	4th	13th	21st	
18	30	(Norway) Morten Bergminrud	Morten Bergminrud	Citroën C4	17th	17th	11th	26th	
19	90	(Germany) Ronny Wechselberger	Marklund Motorsport	Volkswagen Polo	13th	19th	15th	29th	
20	66	(Republic of Ireland) Derek Tohill	LD Motorsports World RX	Citroën DS3	23rd	27th	19th	12th	
21	36	(Norway) Stein Egil Jenssen	Stein Egil Jenssen	Ford Focus	15th	31st	23rd	13th	
22	48	(Sweden) Lukas Walfridson	Helmia Motorsport	Renault Clio	20th	30th	18th	14th	
23	27	(France) Davy Jeanney	Monster Energy World RX	Citroën DS3	22nd	33rd	17th	16th	
24	22	(Belgium) Koen Pauwels	Koen Pauwels	Ford Focus	25th	22nd	14th	27th	
25	99	(Norway) Tord Linnerud	Helmia Motorsport	Renault Clio	29th	18th	12th	31st	
26	91	(Norway) Guttorm Lindefjell	DWC Racing	Volvo C30	39th	20th	10th	25th	
27	7	(Sweden) Emil Öhman	Öhman Racing	Citroën DS3	33rd	29th	21st	15th	
28	95	(Italy) Simone Romagna	PSRX	Citroën DS3	21st	24th	16th	34th	
29	17	(Sweden) Mats Öhman	Öhman Racing	Citroën DS3	36th	26th	20th	22nd	
30	101	(Sweden) Per Eklund	Eklund Motorsport	Saab 9-3	18th	28th	37th	20th	
31	26	(United Kingdom) Andy Scott	Albatec Racing	Peugeot 208	30th	21st	36th	18th	
32	49	(Germany) René Münnich	All-Inkl.com Münnich Motorsport	Audi S3	38th	39th	22nd	19th	
33	69	(Belgium) Jochen Coox	OTRT	Volkswagen Scirocco	31st	23rd	30th	38th	
34	54	(Belgium) Jos Jansen	JJ Racing	Ford Focus	24th	36th	28th	36th	
35	47	(Sweden) Ramona Karlsson	Albatec Racing	Peugeot 208	26th	41st	25th	35th	
36	21	(Poland) Bohdan Ludwiczak	Now or Never	Ford Fiesta	37th	35th	34th	32nd	
37	38	(Germany) Bernd Schomaker	Bernd Schomaker	Škoda Fabia	27th	32nd	38th	39th	
38	86	(Germany) Jörg Jockel	ACN Buxtehude	Ford Focus	34th	38th	40th	30th	
39	35	(Norway) Ole Håbjørg	Ole Håbjørg	Renault Clio	35th	34th	39th	40th	
40	29	(Denmark) Dennis Rømer	Dennis Rømer	SEAT Córdoba	41st	40th	29th	37th	
41	6	(France) Alexandre Theuil	Alexandre Theuil	Citroën DS3	28th	37th	41st	41st	

== Semi-finals ==
=== Semi-final 1 ===
Pos.	No.	Driver	Team	Time	Pts
1	11	(Norway) Petter Solberg	PSRX	3:53.385	6
2	5	(Sweden) Pontus Tidemand	EKS RX	+2.717	5
3	3	(Sweden) Timmy Hansen	Team Peugeot-Hansen	+3.881	4
4	13	(Norway) Andreas Bakkerud	Olsbergs MSE	+5.261	3
5	8	(Sweden) Peter Hedström	Hedströms Motorsport	+6.814	2
6	1	(Russia) Timur Timerzyanov	Team Peugeot-Hansen	+8.049	1

=== Semi-final 2 ===
Pos.	No.	Driver	Team	Time	Pts
1	4	(Sweden) Robin Larsson	Larsson Jernberg Motorsport	3:55.106	6
2	10	(Sweden) Mattias Ekström	EKS RX	+2.283	5
3	57	(Finland) Toomas Heikkinen	Marklund Motorsport	+2.917	4
4	24	(Norway) Tommy Rustad	HTB Racing	+7.263	3
5	14	(Norway) Frode Holte	Frode Holte Motorsport	+8.611	2
6	53	(Sweden) Johan Kristoffersson	Volkswagen Dealer Team KMS	DNF	1

== Final ==
Pos.	No.	Driver	Team	Time	Pts
1	11	(Norway) Petter Solberg	PSRX	3:52.115	8
2	10	(Sweden) Mattias Ekström	EKS RX	+0.005	5
3	4	(Sweden) Robin Larsson	Larsson Jernberg Motorsport	+2.354	4
4	5	(Sweden) Pontus Tidemand	EKS RX	+3.669	3
5	57	(Finland) Toomas Heikkinen	Marklund Motorsport	+4.150	2
6	3	(Sweden) Timmy Hansen	Team Peugeot-Hansen	+5.423	1

== Championship standings after the event ==
Pos.	Driver	Points
1	(Norway) Petter Solberg	212
2	(Finland) Toomas Heikkinen	161
3	(Latvia) Reinis Nitišs	158
4	(Norway) Andreas Bakkerud	135
5	(Russia) Timur Timerzyanov	128

Previous race: 2014 World RX of France	FIA World Rallycross Championship; 2014 season	Next race: 2014 World RX of Italy
Previous race: None	World RX of Germany	Next race: 2015 World RX of Germany
