= 2015 World RX of Belgium =

Rallycross event

- Round 3 of 13 in the 2015 FIA World Rallycross Championship
- Date: 16–17 May 2015
- Location: Mettet, Wallonia
- Venue: Circuit Jules Tacheny Mettet

Results
Heat winners
- Heat 1: (Sweden) Mattias Ekström; EKS RX
- Heat 2: (Sweden) Timmy Hansen; Team Peugeot-Hansen
- Heat 3: Johan Kristoffersson; Volkswagen Team Sweden
- Heat 4: Johan Kristoffersson; Volkswagen Team Sweden
Semi-final winners
- Semi-final 1: (Finland) Toomas Heikkinen; Marklund Motorsport
- Semi-final 2: (Sweden) Per-Gunnar Andersson; Marklund Motorsport
Final
- First: (Finland) Toomas Heikkinen; Marklund Motorsport
- Second: (Norway) Petter Solberg; SDRX
- Third: (Latvia) Reinis Nitišs; Olsbergs MSE

World RX layout of Circuit Jules Tacheny Mettet

The 2015 World RX of Belgium was the 3rd round of the second season of the FIA World Rallycross Championship. The event was held at the Circuit Jules Tacheny Mettet in Mettet, Wallonia.

Marklund Motorsport driver Toomas Heikkinen became the third different winner in the 2015 season, having won his semi-final as well. Second place went to defending champion, and championship leader Petter Solberg (SDRX), while the podium was completed by Reinis Nitišs, driving for the OlsbergsMSE team.

In the supporting round of the FIA European Rallycross Championship, Albatec Racing driver Jérôme Grosset-Janin took the victory, to take the lead in the drivers' championship. Ole Christian Veiby came in second, followed by Grosset-Janin, and Tamás Kárai completed the podium as the lone finisher.

The infamous incident of the damper on Alx Danielsson's Audi S3 punching open the bonnet occurred during practice.

== Heats ==
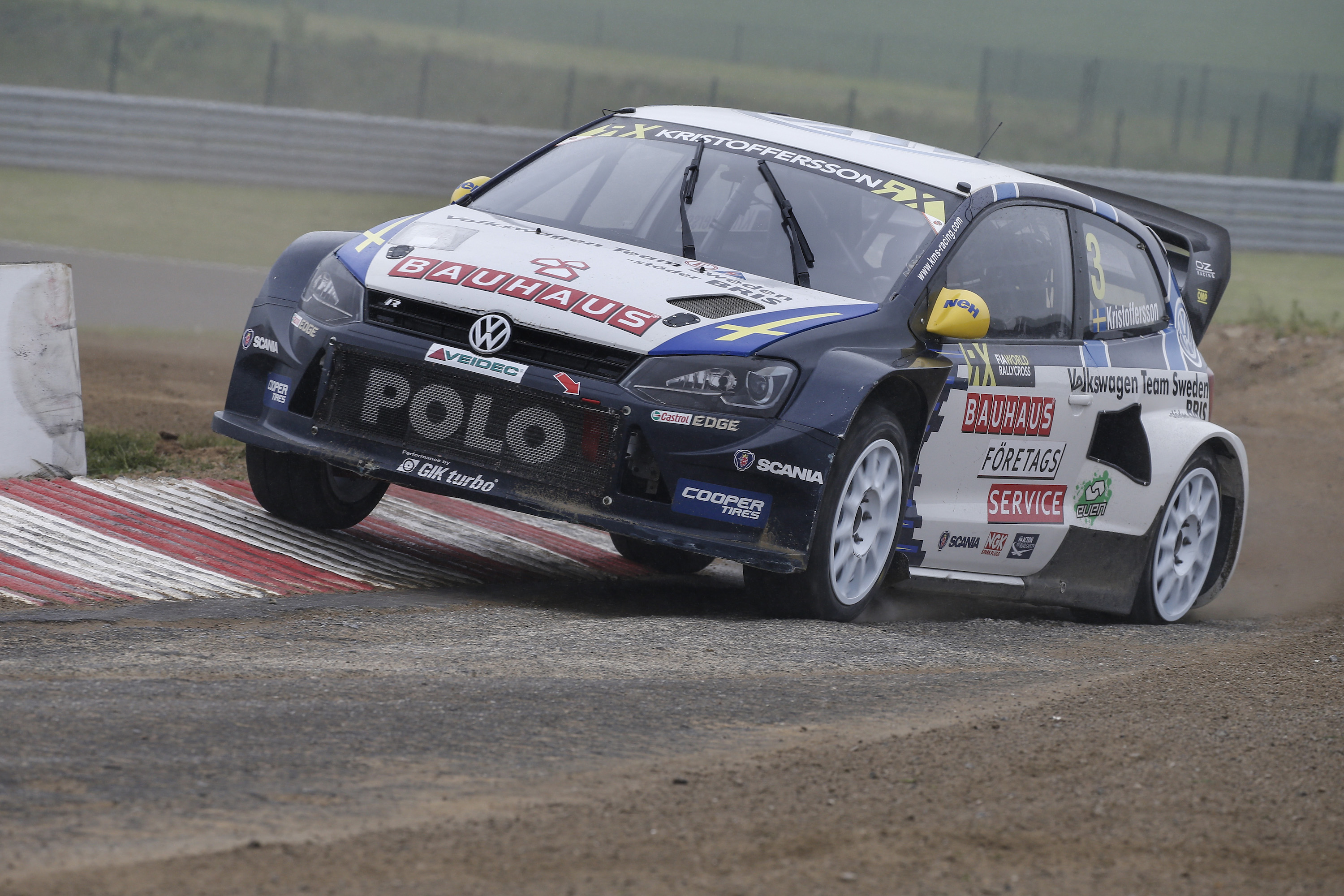
Johan Kristoffersson finished as top qualifier.

World Championship classification
Pos.	No.	Driver	Team	Car	H1	H2	H3	H4	Pts
1	3	(Sweden) Johan Kristoffersson	Volkswagen Team Sweden	Volkswagen Polo	3rd	15th	1st	1st	16
2	1	(Norway) Petter Solberg	SDRX	Citroën DS3	2nd	5th	11th	2nd	15
3	57	(Finland) Toomas Heikkinen	Marklund Motorsport	Volkswagen Polo	8th	2nd	3rd	7th	14
4	10	(Sweden) Mattias Ekström	EKS RX	Audi S1	1st	10th	6th	8th	13
5	45	(Sweden) Per-Gunnar Andersson	Marklund Motorsport	Volkswagen Polo	13th	6th	4th	3rd	12
6	13	(Norway) Andreas Bakkerud	Olsbergs MSE	Ford Fiesta ST	7th	3rd	10th	6th	11
7	21	(Sweden) Timmy Hansen	Team Peugeot-Hansen	Peugeot 208	35th	1st	2nd	10th	10
8	17	(France) Davy Jeanney	Team Peugeot-Hansen	Peugeot 208	9th	8th	15th	11th	9
9	7	(Austria) Manfred Stohl	World RX Team Austria	Ford Fiesta	5th	16th	13th	15th	8
10	92	(Sweden) Anton Marklund	EKS RX	Audi S1	19th	12th	8th	12th	7
11	15	(Latvia) Reinis Nitišs	Olsbergs MSE	Ford Fiesta ST	15th	14th	14th	9th	6
12	99	(Norway) Tord Linnerud	Volkswagen Team Sweden	Volkswagen Polo	6th	21st	12th	13th	5
13	4	(Sweden) Robin Larsson	Larsson Jernberg Racing Team	Audi A1	18th	26th	9th	4th	4
14	42	(Russia) Timur Timerzyanov	Namus OMSE	Ford Fiesta ST	20th	4th	24th	16th	3
15	33	(United Kingdom) Liam Doran	SDRX	Citroën DS3	27th	9th	33rd	17th	2
16	32	(Norway) Ole-Kristian Nøttveit	CircleX	Volvo C30	23rd	27th	35th	25th	1
17	31	(Austria) Max Pucher	World RX Team Austria	Ford Fiesta	31st	33rd	29th	31st	
18	55	(Sweden) Alx Danielsson	All-Inkl.com Münnich Motorsport	Audi S3	25th	17th	34th	35th	
19	77	(Germany) René Münnich	All-Inkl.com Münnich Motorsport	Audi S3	34th	32nd	27th	32nd	
European Championship classification
1	24	(Norway) Tommy Rustad	HTB Racing-Marklund Motorsport	Volkswagen Polo	10th	34th	7th	5th	16
2	74	(France) Jérôme Grosset-Janin	Albatec Racing	Peugeot 208	16th	11th	16th	14th	15
3	67	(Belgium) François Duval	François Duval	Ford Focus	17th	7th	17th	19th	14
4	52	(Norway) Ole Christian Veiby	Volkswagen Team Sweden	Volkswagen Polo	4th	30th	5th	27th	13
5	14	(Norway) Frode Holte	Frode Holte Motorsport	Hyundai i20	12th	24th	20th	20th	12
6	60	(Finland) Joni-Pekka Rajala	Eklund Motorsport	Saab 9-3	11th	25th	19th	22nd	11
7	87	(France) Jean-Baptiste Dubourg	Jean-Baptiste Dubourg	Citroën C4	26th	18th	18th	18th	10
8	20	(France) Fabien Pailler	Pailler Competition	Peugeot 208	21st	13th	23rd	23rd	9
9	18	(France) Jonathan Pailler	Pailler Competition	Peugeot 208	22nd	19th	21st	24th	8
10	48	(Sweden) Lukas Walfridson	Helmia Motorsport	Renault Clio	14th	20th	28th	34th	7
11	22	(Belgium) Koen Pauwels	Koen Pauwels	Ford Focus	30th	23rd	26th	26th	6
12	102	(Hungary) Tamás Kárai	Racing-Com	Škoda Fabia	37th	22nd	22nd	21st	5
13	2	(Republic of Ireland) Oliver O'Donovan	Oliver O'Donovan	Ford Fiesta	32nd	29th	25th	28th	4
14	27	(United Kingdom) James Grint	Albatec Racing	Peugeot 208	28th	28th	32nd	30th	3
15	47	(Sweden) Ramona Karlsson	Ramona RX	Volkswagen Scirocco	24th	36th	30th	29th	2
16	8	(Sweden) Peter Hedström	Hedströms Motorsport	Škoda Fabia	36th	37th	31st	33rd	1
17	12	(Finland) Riku Tahko	ST Motorsport	BMW MINI Countryman	29th	31st	36th	36th	
18	68	(Belgium) Ronny Schevenheels	OTRT	Volkswagen Scirocco	33rd	35th	37th	37th	

== Semi-finals ==
=== World Championship ===
==== Semi-final 1 ====
Pos.	No.	Driver	Team	Time	Pts
1	57	(Finland) Toomas Heikkinen	Marklund Motorsport	4:08.158	6
2	13	(Norway) Andreas Bakkerud	Olsbergs MSE	+2.540	5
3	15	(Latvia) Reinis Nitišs	Olsbergs MSE	+4.080	4
4	17	(Sweden) Timmy Hansen	Team Peugeot-Hansen	+9.204	3
5	3	(Sweden) Johan Kristoffersson	Volkswagen Team Sweden	+25.173	2
6	7	(Austria) Manfred Stohl	World RX Team Austria	+35.091	1

==== Semi-final 2 ====
Pos.	No.	Driver	Team	Time	Pts
1	45	(Sweden) Per-Gunnar Andersson	Marklund Motorsport	4:05.225	6
2	1	(Norway) Petter Solberg	SDRX	+0.809	5
3	10	(Sweden) Mattias Ekström	EKS RX	+0.936	4
4	92	(Sweden) Anton Marklund	EKS RX	+4.081	3
5	21	(France) Davy Jeanney	Team Peugeot-Hansen	+4.553	2
6	99	(Norway) Tord Linnerud	Volkswagen Team Sweden	+13.388	1

=== European Championship ===
==== Semi-final 1 ====
Pos.	No.	Driver	Team	Time	Pts
1	67	(Belgium) François Duval	François Duval	4:12.108	6
2	14	(Norway) Frode Holte	Frode Holte Motorsport	+2.622	5
3	24	(Norway) Tommy Rustad	HTB Racing-Marklund Motorsport	+4.574	4
4	18	(France) Jonathan Pailler	Pailler Competition	+8.704	3
5	87	(France) Jean-Baptiste Dubourg	Jean-Baptiste Dubourg	+9.844	2
6	22	(Belgium) Koen Pauwels	Koen Pauwels	DNF	1

==== Semi-final 2 ====
Pos.	No.	Driver	Team	Time	Pts
1	74	(France) Jérôme Grosset-Janin	Albatec Racing	+4:12.247	6
2	52	(Norway) Ole Christian Veiby	Volkswagen Team Sweden	+1.587	5
3	102	(Hungary) Tamás Kárai	Racing-Com	+11.850	4
4	60	(Finland) Joni-Pekka Rajala	Eklund Motorsport	+35.759	3
5	20	(France) Fabien Pailler	Pailler Competition	DNF	2
6	48	(Sweden) Lukas Walfridsson	Helmia Motorsport	DNF	1

== Finals ==
=== World Championship ===
Pos.	No.	Driver	Team	Time	Pts
1	57	(Finland) Toomas Heikkinen	Marklund Motorsport	4:02.117	8
2	1	(Norway) Petter Solberg	SDRX	+0.840	5
3	15	(Latvia) Reinis Nitišs	Olsbergs MSE	+6.705	4
4	45	(Sweden) Per-Gunnar Andersson	Marklund Motorsport	+7.583	3
5	13	(Norway) Andreas Bakkerud	Olsbergs MSE	+27.425	2
6	10	(Sweden) Mattias Ekström	EKS RX		1

=== European Championship ===
Pos.	No.	Driver	Team	Time	Pts
1	74	(France) Jérôme Grosset-Janin	Albatec Racing	4:14.273	8
2	52	(Norway) Ole Christian Veiby	Volkswagen Team Sweden	+10.493	5
3	102	(Hungary) Tamás Kárai	Racing-Com	+12.614	4
4	24	(Norway) Tommy Rustad	HTB Racing-Marklund Motorsport	DNF	3
5	14	(Norway) Frode Holte	Frode Holte Motorsport	DNF	2
6	67	(Belgium) François Duval	François Duval	DSQ	1

== Standings after the event ==
World Championship standings

Pos	Driver	Pts
1	(Norway) Petter Solberg	82
2	(Sweden) Johan Kristoffersson	60
3	(Finland) Toomas Heikkinen	57
4	(Norway) Andreas Bakkerud	56
5	(Sweden) Timmy Hansen	50

European Championship standings

Pos	Driver	Pts
1	(France) Jérôme Grosset-Janin	29
2	(Norway) Ole Christian Veiby	23
2	(Norway) Tommy Rustad	23
4	(Belgium) François Duval	21
5	(Norway) Frode Holte	19

- Note: Only the top five positions are included for both sets of standings.

Previous race: 2015 World RX of Hockenheim	FIA World Rallycross Championship; 2015 season	Next race: 2015 World RX of Great Britain
Previous race: 2014 World RX of Belgium	World RX of Belgium	Next race: 2016 World RX of Belgium
