= 2015 World RX of Italy =

Rallycross event

- Round 12 of 13 in the 2015 FIA World Rallycross Championship
- Date: 17–18 October 2015
- Location: Franciacorta, Lombardy
- Venue: Franciacorta International Circuit

Results
Heat winners
- Heat 1: Johan Kristoffersson; Volkswagen Team Sweden
- Heat 2: (Norway) Petter Solberg; SDRX
- Heat 3: (Latvia) Reinis Nitišs; Olsbergs MSE
- Heat 4: (Norway) Petter Solberg; SDRX
Semi-final winners
- Semi-final 1: Johan Kristoffersson; Volkswagen Team Sweden
- Semi-final 2: (Norway) Andreas Bakkerud; Olsbergs MSE
Final
- First: (Norway) Andreas Bakkerud; Olsbergs MSE
- Second: Johan Kristoffersson; Volkswagen Team Sweden
- Third: (Norway) Petter Solberg; SDRX

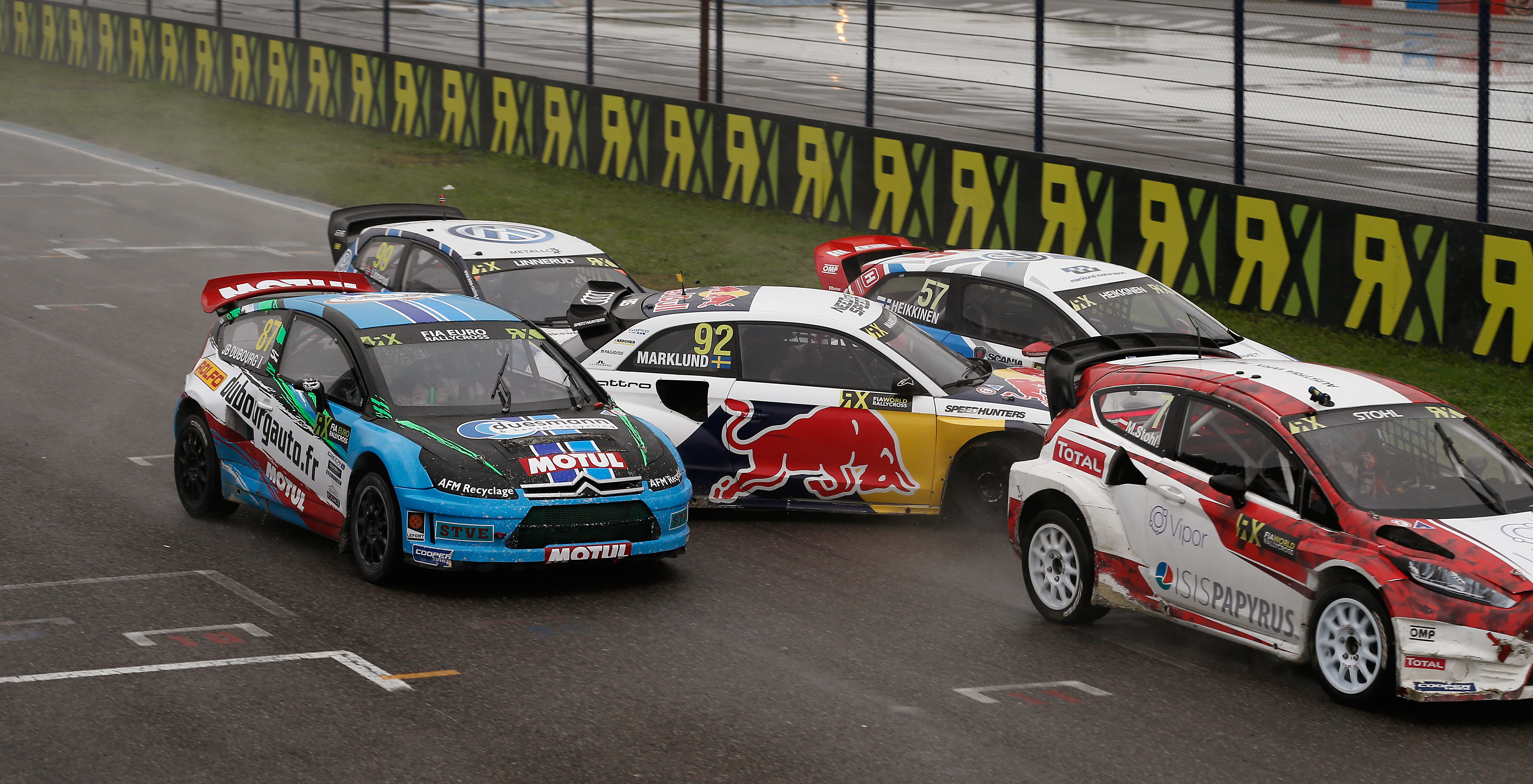
Manfred Stohl, JB Dubourg, Anton Marklund, Toomas Heikkinen and Tord Linnerud battle off the start line

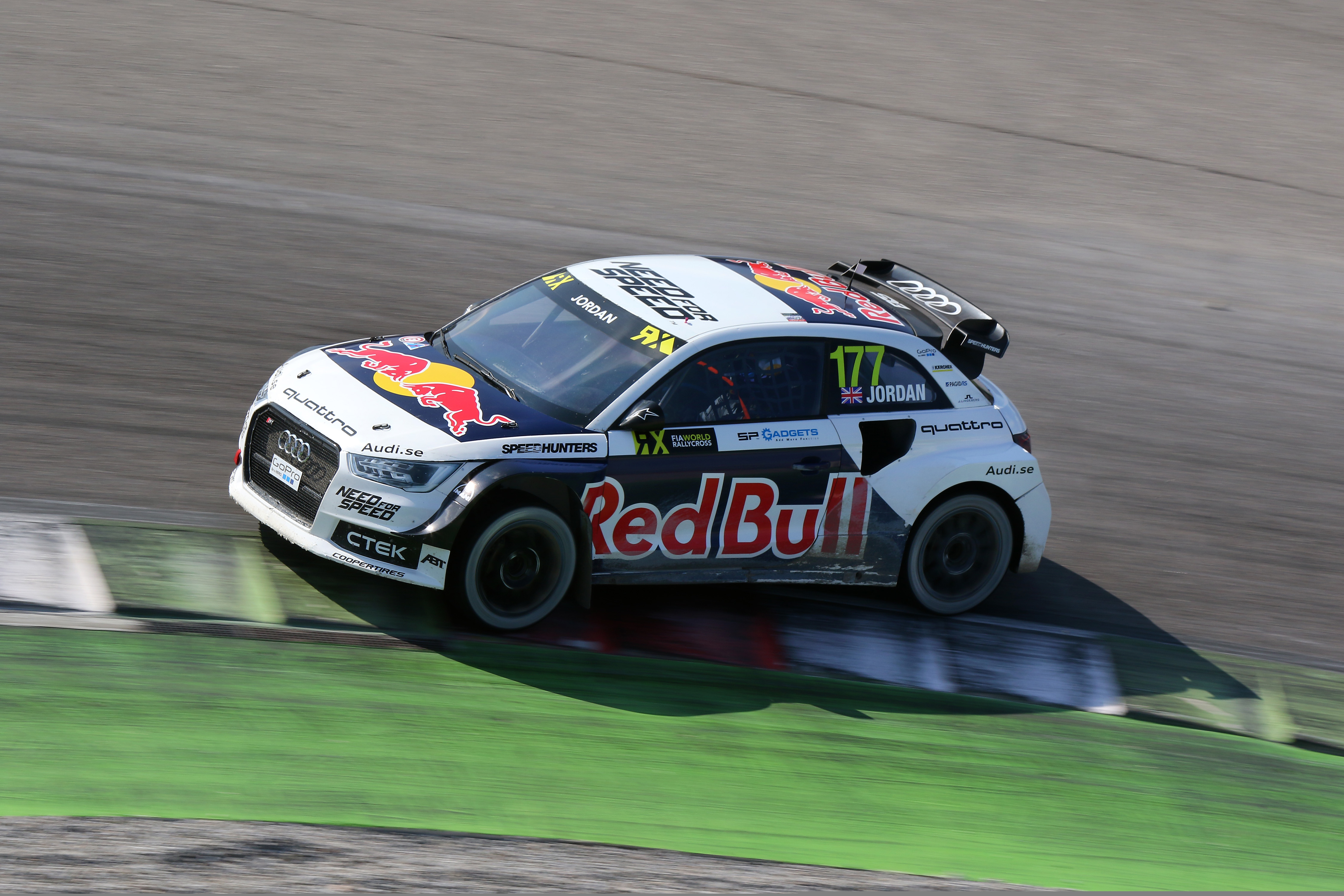
Former British RX and BTCC champion Andrew Jordan made his third appearance in a WRX Supercar

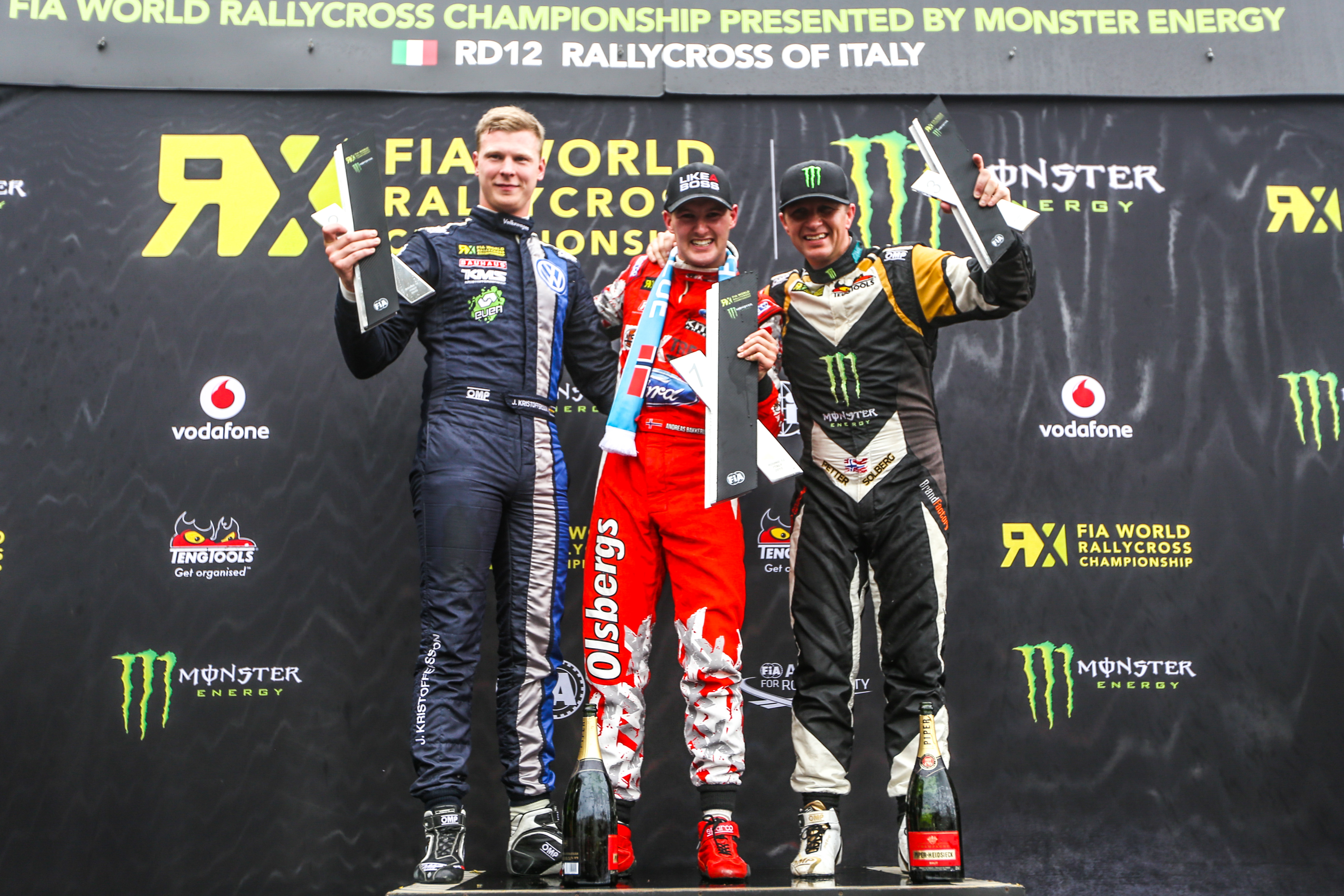
Event podium

The 2015 World RX of Italy was the twelfth round of the second season of the FIA World Rallycross Championship. The event was held at the Franciacorta International Circuit in Franciacorta, Lombardy.

== Heats ==
World Championship classification
Pos.	No.	Driver	Team	Car	H1	H2	H3	H4	Pts
1	3	(Sweden) Johan Kristoffersson	Volkswagen Team Sweden	Volkswagen Polo	1st	2nd	2nd	9th	16
2	21	(Sweden) Timmy Hansen	Team Peugeot-Hansen	Peugeot 208	6th	3rd	11th	2nd	15
3	1	(Norway) Petter Solberg	SDRX	Citroën DS3	2nd	1st	34th	1st	14
4	13	(Norway) Andreas Bakkerud	Olsbergs MSE	Ford Fiesta ST	10th	11th	3rd	5th	13
5	4	(Sweden) Robin Larsson	Larsson Jernberg Racing Team	Audi A1	9th	14th	6th	3rd	12
6	15	(Latvia) Reinis Nitišs	Olsbergs MSE	Ford Fiesta ST	15th	17th	1st	8th	11
7	42	(Russia) Timur Timerzyanov	Namus OMSE	Ford Fiesta ST	3rd	5th	10th	18th	10
8	92	(Sweden) Anton Marklund	EKS RX	Audi S1	11th	8th	12th	7th	9
9	17	(France) Davy Jeanney	Team Peugeot-Hansen	Peugeot 208	12th	15th	4th	21st	8
10	99	(Norway) Tord Linnerud	Volkswagen Team Sweden	Volkswagen Polo	17th	7th	15th	15th	7
11	33	(United Kingdom) Liam Doran	SDRX	Citroën DS3	34th	4th	13th	4th	6
12	7	(Austria) Manfred Stohl	World RX Team Austria	Ford Fiesta	30th	9th	8th	12th	5
13	57	(Finland) Toomas Heikkinen	Marklund Motorsport	Volkswagen Polo	8th	6th	36th	6th	4
14	45	(Sweden) Per-Gunnar Andersson	Marklund Motorsport	Volkswagen Polo	21st	34th	5th	11th	3
15	88	(Norway) Henning Solberg	Eklund Motorsport	Volkswagen Beetle	28th	13th	14th	34th	2
16	65	(France) Guerlain Chicherit	JRM Racing	BMW MINI Countryman	16th	22nd	37th	19th	1
17	62	(France) Gaëtan Sérazin	Gaëtan Sérazin	Peugeot 208	32nd	22nd	19th	29th	
18	31	(Austria) Max Pucher	World RX Team Austria	Ford Fiesta	29th	27th	31st	28th	
19	110	(Italy) Gianni Morbidelli	All-Inkl.com Münnich Motorsport	Audi S3	36th	26th	28th	27th	
20	77	(Germany) René Münnich	All-Inkl.com Münnich Motorsport	Audi S3	20th	33rd	38th	37th	
21	177	(United Kingdom) Andrew Jordan	EKS RX	Audi S1	31st	38th	39th	38th	
22	25	(Italy) Gigi Galli	Gigi Galli	Kia Rio	40th	40th	41st	40th	
European Championship classification
1	24	(Norway) Tommy Rustad	HTB Racing-Marklund Motorsport	Volkswagen Polo	4th	30th	7th	13th	16
2	87	(France) Jean-Baptiste Dubourg	Jean-Baptiste Dubourg	Citroën C4	35th	10th	9th	10th	15
3	28	(Norway) Alexander Hvaal	JC Raceteknik	Citroën DS3	7th	12th	32nd	14th	14
4	16	(Hungary) Tamás Pál Kiss	Hansen Talent Development	Peugeot 208	13th	20th	18th	20th	13
5	8	(Sweden) Peter Hedström	Hedströms Motorsport	Ford Fiesta	18th	18th	16th	22nd	12
6	74	(France) Jérôme Grosset-Janin	Albatec Racing	Peugeot 208	5th	16th	21st	33rd	11
7	52	(Norway) Ole Christian Veiby	Volkswagen Team Sweden	Volkswagen Polo	14th	19th	29th	17th	10
8	60	(Finland) Joni-Pekka Rajala	Eklund Motorsport	Saab 9-3	22nd	21st	25th	16th	9
9	48	(Sweden) Lukas Walfridson	Helmia Motorsport	Renault Clio	19th	23rd	27th	24th	8
10	18	(France) Jonathan Pailler	Pailler Compétition	Peugeot 208	27th	31st	23rd	25th	7
11	72	(France) Philippe Maloigne	Philippe Maloigne	Citroën C4	24th	28th	26th	31st	6
12	102	(Hungary) Tamás Kárai	Racing-Com	Audi A1	41st	25th	22nd	23rd	5
13	20	(France) Fabien Pailler	Pailler Compétition	Peugeot 208	26th	36th	20th	26th	4
14	27	(United Kingdom) James Grint	Albatec Racing	Peugeot 208	25th	24th	35th	32nd	3
15	2	(Republic of Ireland) Oliver O'Donovan	Oliver O'Donovan	Ford Fiesta	23rd	35th	17th	35th	2
16	103	(Norway) Anders Bråten	Kjør For Livet	Ford Fiesta	33rd	37th	24th	30th	1
17	30	(Norway) Ole Kristian Temte	Ole Kristian Temte	Citroën C4	38th	32nd	30th	36th	
18	83	(Poland) Robert Czarnecki	Robert Czarnecki	Mitsubishi Lancer	37th	41st	33rd	41st	
19	12	(Finland) Riku Tahko	ST Motorsport	BMW MINI Countryman	39th	39th	40th	39th	

== Semi-finals ==
=== World Championship ===
==== Semi-final 1 ====
Pos.	No.	Driver	Team	Time	Pts
1	3	(Sweden) Johan Kristoffersson	Volkswagen Team Sweden	4:45.665	6
2	1	(Norway) Petter Solberg	SDRX	+2.994	5
3	42	(Russia) Timur Timerzyanov	Namus OMSE	+5.285	4
4	4	(Sweden) Robin Larsson	Larsson Jernberg Racing Team	+7.919	3
5	33	(United Kingdom) Liam Doran	SDRX	+8.568	2
6	17	(France) Davy Jeanney	Team Peugeot-Hansen	+41.632	1

==== Semi-final 2 ====
Pos.	No.	Driver	Team	Time	Pts
1	13	(Norway) Andreas Bakkerud	Olsbergs MSE	4:50.816	6
2	92	(Sweden) Anton Marklund	EKS RX	+1.527	5
3	7	(Austria) Manfred Stohl	World RX Team Austria	+4.308	4
4	15	(Latvia) Reinis Nitišs	Olsbergs MSE	+5.765	3
5	99	(Norway) Tord Linnerud	Volkswagen Team Sweden	+43.115	2
6	21	(Sweden) Timmy Hansen	Team Peugeot-Hansen	DNF	1

=== European Championship ===
==== Semi-final 1 ====
Pos.	No.	Driver	Team	Time	Pts
1	24	(Norway) Tommy Rustad	HTB Racing-Marklund Motorsport	4:51.271	6
2	52	(Norway) Ole Christian Veiby	Volkswagen Team Sweden	+4.232	5
3	8	(Sweden) Peter Hedström	Hedströms Motorsport	+4.941	4
4	72	(France) Philippe Maloigne	Philippe Maloigne	+13.868	3
5	28	(Norway) Alexander Hvaal	JC Raceteknik	DNF	2
6	48	(Sweden) Lukas Walfridsson	Helmia Motorsport	EX	0

==== Semi-final 2 ====
Pos.	No.	Driver	Team	Time	Pts
1	16	(Hungary) Tamás Pál Kiss	Hansen Talent Development	4:52.372	6
2	74	(France) Jérôme Grosset-Janin	Albatec Racing	+0.734	5
3	87	(France) Jean-Baptiste Dubourg	Jean-Baptiste Dubourg	+2.545	4
4	60	(Finland) Joni-Pekka Rajala	Eklund Motorsport	+3.937	3
5	18	(France) Jonathan Pailler	Pailler Compétition	+8.325	2
6	102	(Hungary) Tamás Kárai	Racing-Com	DNF	1

== Finals ==
=== World Championship ===
Pos.	No.	Driver	Team	Time	Pts
1	13	(Norway) Andreas Bakkerud	Olsbergs MSE	4:45.216	8
2	3	(Sweden) Johan Kristoffersson	Volkswagen Team Sweden	+1.951	5
3	1	(Norway) Petter Solberg	SDRX	+4.081	4
4	92	(Sweden) Anton Marklund	EKS RX	+12.874	3
5	7	(Austria) Manfred Stohl	World RX Team Austria	+24.021	2
6	42	(Russia) Timur Timerzyanov	Namus OMSE	+31.426	1

=== European Championship ===
Pos.	No.	Driver	Team	Time/retired	Pts
1	24	(Norway) Tommy Rustad	HTB Racing-Marklund Motorsport	4:49.561	8
2	87	(France) Jean-Baptiste Dubourg	Jean-Baptiste Dubourg	+1.523	5
3	52	(Norway) Ole Christian Veiby	Volkswagen Team Sweden	+7.219	4
4	8	(Sweden) Peter Hedström	Hedströms Motorsport	+9.564	3
5	74	(France) Jérôme Grosset-Janin	Albatec Racing	DNF	2
6	16	(Hungary) Tamás Pál Kiss	Hansen Talent Development	DNS	1

== Standings after the event ==
World Championship standings

Pos	Driver	Pts
1	(Norway) Petter Solberg	279
2	(Sweden) Timmy Hansen	253
3	(Sweden) Johan Kristoffersson	228
4	(Norway) Andreas Bakkerud	215
5	(France) Davy Jeanney	189

European Championship standings

Pos	Driver	Pts
1	(Norway) Tommy Rustad	135
2	(France) Jérôme Grosset-Janin	117
3	(Norway) Ole Christian Veiby	86
3	(Finland) Joni-Pekka Rajala	86
5	(France) Jean-Baptiste Dubourg	77

- Note: Only the top five positions are included for both sets of standings.

Previous race: 2015 World RX of Turkey	FIA World Rallycross Championship; 2015 season	Next race: 2015 World RX of Argentina
Previous race: 2014 World RX of Italy	World RX of Italy	Next race: None
