= 2015 World RX of Germany =

Rallycross event

- Round 5 of 13 in the 2015 FIA World Rallycross Championship
- Date: 20–21 June 2015
- Location: Buxtehude, Lower Saxony
- Venue: Estering

Results
Heat winners
- Heat 1: (France) Davy Jeanney; Team Peugeot-Hansen
- Heat 2: (France) Davy Jeanney; Team Peugeot-Hansen
- Heat 3: (France) Davy Jeanney; Team Peugeot-Hansen
- Heat 4: (Norway) Petter Solberg; SDRX
Semi-final winners
- Semi-final 1: (France) Davy Jeanney; Team Peugeot-Hansen
- Semi-final 2: (Norway) Petter Solberg; SDRX
Final
- First: (France) Davy Jeanney; Team Peugeot-Hansen
- Second: (Norway) Petter Solberg; SDRX
- Third: (Sweden) Timmy Hansen; Team Peugeot-Hansen

World RX layout of Estering

The 2015 World RX of Germany was the fifth round of the second season of the FIA World Rallycross Championship. The event was held at the Estering in Buxtehude, Lower Saxony.

It was the first event win for Frenchman Davy Jeanney.

== Heats ==
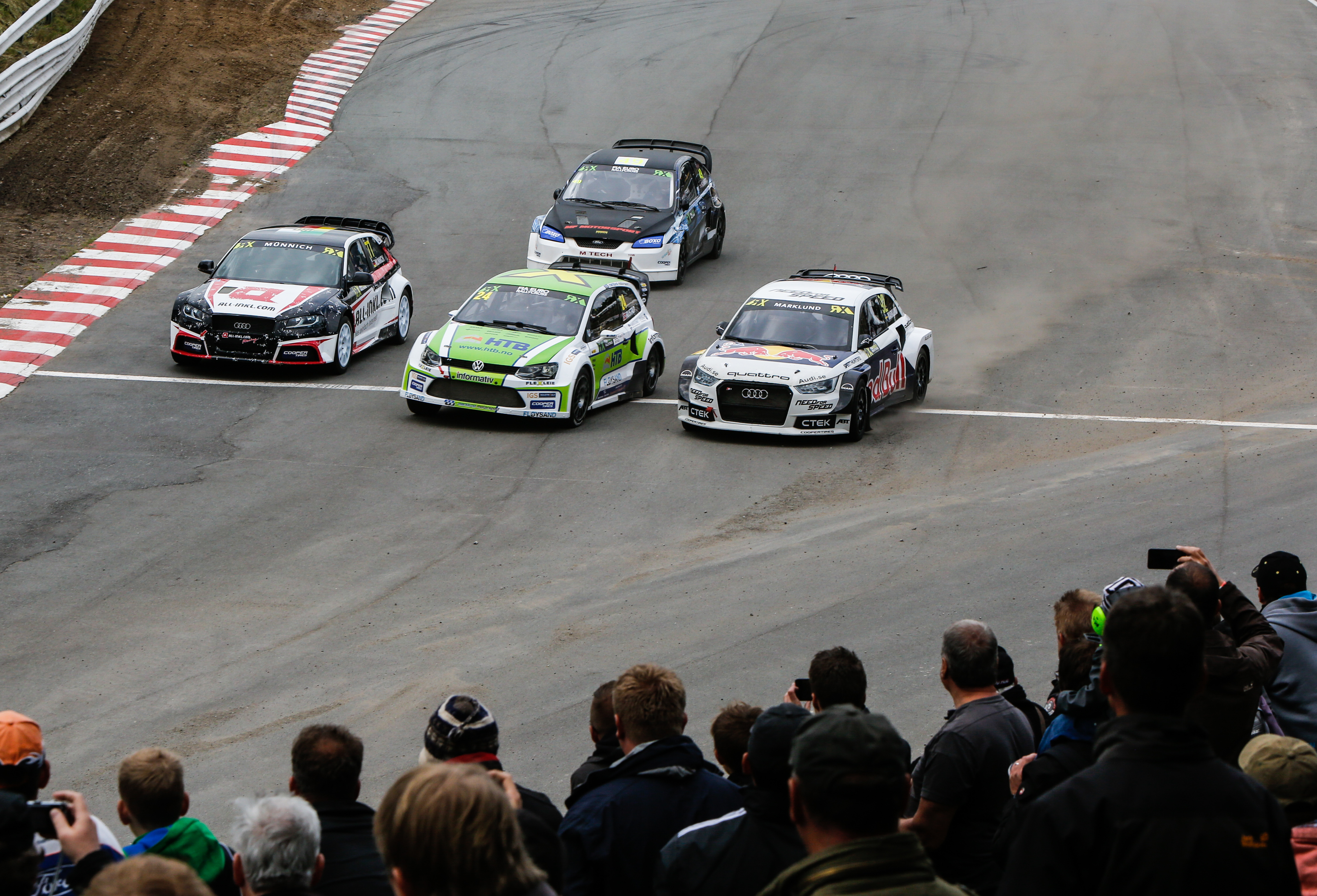
Tommy Rustad, Anton Marklund, René Münnich and Mark Flaherty

World Championship classification
Pos.	No.	Driver	Team	Car	H1	H2	H3	H4	Pts
1	17	(France) Davy Jeanney	Team Peugeot-Hansen	Peugeot 208	1st	1st	1st	27th	16
2	1	(Norway) Petter Solberg	SDRX	Citroën DS3	10th	4th	3rd	1st	15
3	15	(Latvia) Reinis Nitišs	Olsbergs MSE	Ford Fiesta ST	3rd	3rd	8th	6th	14
4	99	(Norway) Tord Linnerud	Volkswagen Team Sweden	Volkswagen Polo	6th	2nd	7th	11th	13
5	3	(Sweden) Johan Kristoffersson	Volkswagen Team Sweden	Volkswagen Polo	2nd	27th	10th	7th	12
6	7	(Austria) Manfred Stohl	World RX Team Austria	Ford Fiesta	23rd	13th	6th	4th	11
7	92	(Sweden) Anton Marklund	EKS RX	Audi S1	13th	21st	5th	8th	10
8	4	(Sweden) Robin Larsson	Larsson Jernberg Racing Team	Audi A1	8th	9th	4th	28th	9
9	21	(Sweden) Timmy Hansen	Team Peugeot-Hansen	Peugeot 208	5th	31st	13th	13th	8
10	13	(Norway) Andreas Bakkerud	Olsbergs MSE	Ford Fiesta ST	4th	11th	34th	10th	7
11	42	(Russia) Timur Timerzyanov	Namus OMSE	Ford Fiesta ST	33rd	10th	9th	16th	6
12	77	(Germany) René Münnich	All-Inkl.com Münnich Motorsport	Audi S3	18th	14th	26th	14th	5
13	57	(Finland) Toomas Heikkinen	Marklund Motorsport	Volkswagen Polo	34th	15th	11th	9th	4
14	45	(Sweden) Per-Gunnar Andersson	Marklund Motorsport	Volkswagen Polo	25th	6th	32nd	17th	3
15	10	(Sweden) Mattias Ekström	EKS RX	Audi S1	32nd	34th	17th	3rd	2
16	55	(Sweden) Alx Danielsson	All-Inkl.com Münnich Motorsport	Audi S3	30th	17th	29th	18th	1
17	31	(Austria) Max Pucher	World RX Team Austria	Ford Fiesta	27th	23rd	35th	29th	
European Championship classification
1	24	(Norway) Tommy Rustad	HTB Racing-Marklund Motorsport	Volkswagen Polo	7th	5th	2nd	2nd	16
2	74	(France) Jerome Grosset-Janin	Albatec Racing	Peugeot 208	11th	7th	12th	5th	15
3	52	(Norway) Ole Christian Veiby	Volkswagen Team Sweden	Volkswagen Polo	16th	12th	20th	15th	14
4	87	(France) Jean-Baptiste Dubourg	Jean-Baptiste Dubourg	Citroën C4	14th	7th	23rd	22nd	13
5	60	(Finland) Joni-Pekka Rajala	Eklund Motorsport	Saab 9-3	29th	16th	16th	12th	12
6	14	(Norway) Frode Holte	Frode Holte Motorsport	Hyundai i20	15th	8th	14th	31st	11
7	20	(France) Fabien Pailler	Pailler Compétition	Peugeot 208	31st	20th	15th	20th	10
8	18	(France) Jonathan Pailler	Pailler Compétition	Peugeot 208	21st	18th	19th	30th	9
9	2	(Republic of Ireland) Oliver O'Donovan	Oliver O'Donovan	Ford Fiesta	17th	30th	24th	21st	8
10	27	(United Kingdom) James Grint	Albatec Racing	Peugeot 208	22nd	25th	22nd	23rd	7
11	8	(Sweden) Peter Hedström	Hedströms Motorsport	Škoda Fabia	9th	32nd	31st	19th	6
12	22	(Belgium) Koen Pauwels	Koen Pauwels	Ford Fiesta	19th	26th	27th	24th	5
13	49	(United Kingdom) Mark Flaherty	Mark Flaherty	Ford Fiesta	24th	22nd	30th	25th	4
14	47	(Sweden) Ramona Karlsson	Ramona RX	Volkswagen Scirocco	12th	33rd	21st	33rd	3
15	12	(Finland) Riku Tahko	ST Motorsport	BMW MINI Countryman	26th	28th	28th	26th	2
16	102	(Hungary) Tamas Karai	Racing-Com	Škoda Fabia	20th	29th	25th	34th	1
17	48	(Sweden) Lukas Walfridsson	Helmia Motorsport	Renault Clio	35th	19th	17th	32nd	
18	86	(Germany) Jörg Jockel	ADAC Team Hansa	Ford Fiesta	28th	35th	33rd	35th	

== Semi-finals ==
=== World Championship ===
==== Semi-final 1 ====
Pos.	No.	Driver	Team	Time	Pts
1	21	(France) Davy Jeanney	Team Peugeot-Hansen	3:45.665	6
2	3	(Sweden) Johan Kristoffersson	Volkswagen Team Sweden	+1.219	5
3	17	(Sweden) Timmy Hansen	Team Peugeot-Hansen	+2.141	4
4	42	(Russia) Timur Timerzyanov	Namus OMSE	+2.812	3
5	15	(Latvia) Reinis Nitišs	Olsbergs MSE	DNF	2
6	92	(Sweden) Anton Marklund	EKS RX	DNF	1

==== Semi-final 2 ====
Pos.	No.	Driver	Team	Time	Pts
1	1	(Norway) Petter Solberg	SDRX	3:49.052	6
2	99	(Norway) Tord Linnerud	Volkswagen Team Sweden	+0.390	5
3	13	(Norway) Andreas Bakkerud	Olsbergs MSE	+0.752	4
4	4	(Sweden) Robin Larsson	Larsson Jernberg Racing Team	+1.782	3
5	7	(Austria) Manfred Stohl	World RX Team Austria	+20.504	2
6	77	(Germany) René Münnich	All-Inkl.com Münnich Motorsport	DNF	1

=== European Championship ===
==== Semi-final 1 ====
Pos.	No.	Driver	Team	Time	Pts
1	24	(Norway) Tommy Rustad	HTB Racing-Marklund Motorsport	3:50.439	6
2	20	(France) Fabien Pailler	Pailler Compétition	+2.642	5
3	60	(Finland) Joni-Pekka Rajala	Eklund Motorsport	+4.561	4
4	52	(Norway) Ole Christian Veiby	Volkswagen Team Sweden	+6.186	3
5	2	(Republic of Ireland) Oliver O'Donovan	Oliver O'Donovan	+10.048	2
6	8	(Sweden) Peter Hedström	Hedströms Motorsport	+23.213	1

==== Semi-final 2 ====
Pos.	No.	Driver	Team	Time	Pts
1	74	(France) Jérôme Grosset-Janin	Albatec Racing	3:46.628	6
2	87	(France) Jean-Baptiste Dubourg	Jean-Baptiste Dubourg	+0.709	5
3	18	(France) Jonathan Pailler	Pailler Compétition	+5.401	4
4	14	(Norway) Frode Holte	Frode Holte Motorsport	+5.824	3
5	22	(Belgium) Koen Pauwels	Koen Pauwels	+10.526	2
6	27	(United Kingdom) James Grint	Albatec Racing	+23.636	1

== Finals ==
=== World Championship ===
Pos.	No.	Driver	Team	Time	Pts
1	21	(France) Davy Jeanney	Team Peugeot-Hansen	3:45.662	8
2	1	(Norway) Petter Solberg	SDRX	+4.901	5
3	17	(Sweden) Timmy Hansen	Team Peugeot-Hansen	+5.538	4
4	3	(Sweden) Johan Kristoffersson	Volkswagen Team Sweden	+5.815	3
5	13	(Norway) Andreas Bakkerud	Olsbergs MSE	+10.188	2
6	99	(Norway) Tord Linnerud	Volkswagen Team Sweden	+11.231	1

=== European Championship ===
Pos.	No.	Driver	Team	Time	Pts
1	24	(Norway) Tommy Rustad	HTB Racing-Marklund Motorsport	3:45.706	8
2	74	(France) Jérôme Grosset-Janin	Albatec Racing	+1.317	5
3	20	(France) Fabien Pailler	Pailler Compétition	+10.960	4
4	87	(France) Jean-Baptiste Dubourg	Jean-Baptiste Dubourg	+11.114	3
5	60	(Finland) Joni-Pekka Rajala	Eklund Motorsport	+12.687	2
6	18	(France) Jonathan Pailler	Pailler Compétition	DNF	1

== Standings after the event ==
World Championship standings

Pos	Driver	Pts
1	(Norway) Petter Solberg	138
2	(Sweden) Johan Kristoffersson	103
3	(Norway) Andreas Bakkerud	88
4	(Sweden) Timmy Hansen	79
5	(France) Davy Jeanney	77
5	(Latvia) Reinis Nitišs	77

European Championship standings

Pos	Driver	Pts
1	(France) Jérôme Grosset-Janin	55
2	(Norway) Tommy Rustad	53
3	(Norway) Ole Christian Veiby	40
4	(Finland) Joni-Pekka Rajala	32
5	(France) Fabien Pailler	30
5	(Norway) Frode Holte	30

- Note: Only the top five positions are included for both sets of standings.

Previous race: 2015 World RX of Great Britain	FIA World Rallycross Championship; 2015 season	Next race: 2015 World RX of Sweden
Previous race: 2014 World RX of Germany	World RX of Germany	Next race: 2016 World RX of Germany
