= Per Eklund Motorsport =

Swedish motor racing team

(Sweden) Per Eklund Motorsport
- Founded: ?
- Team principal(s): Per Eklund
- Current series: FIA European Rallycross Championship
- Current drivers: 76. (Sweden) Philip Gehrman

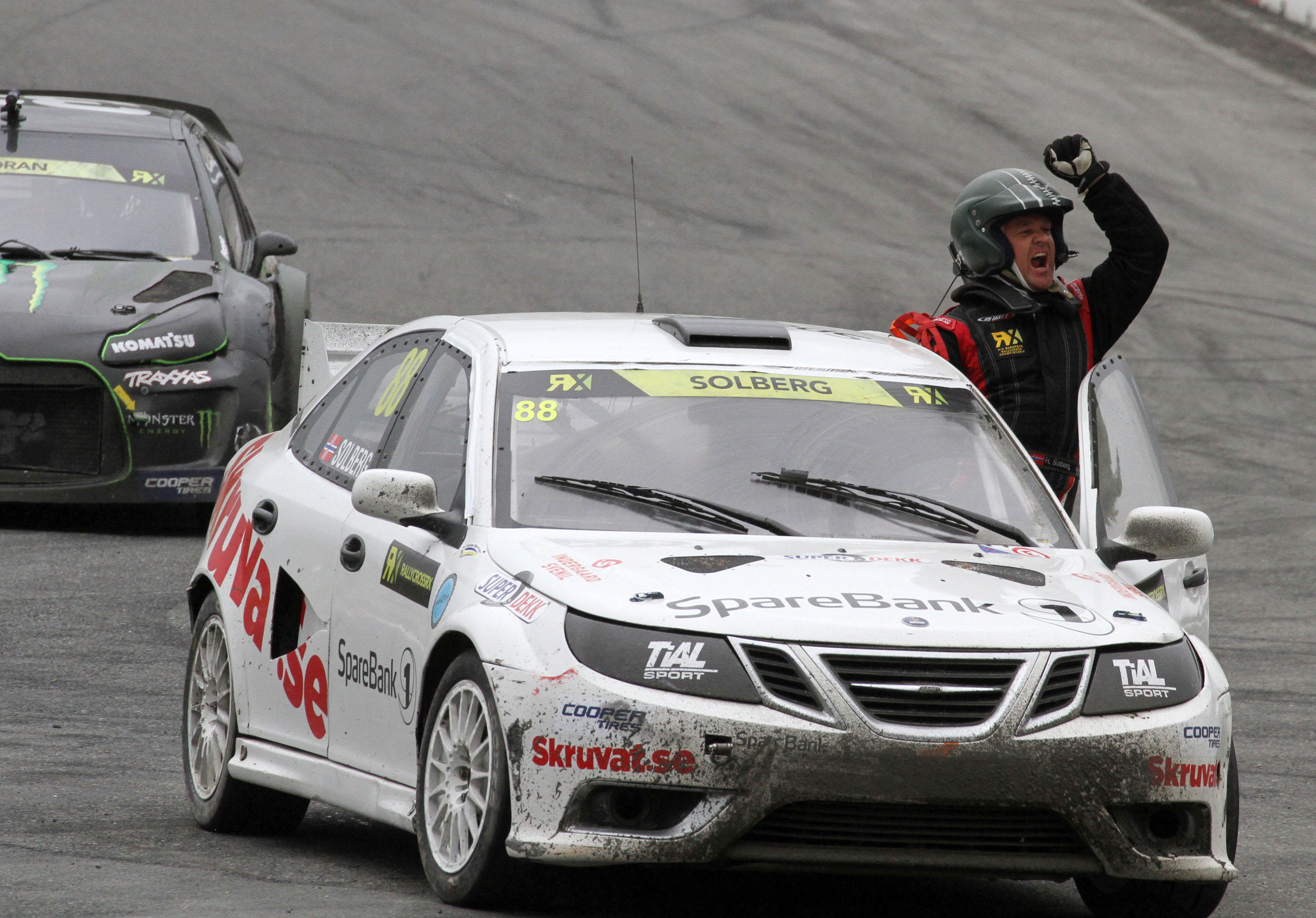
Henning Solberg at the 2014 World RX of Norway

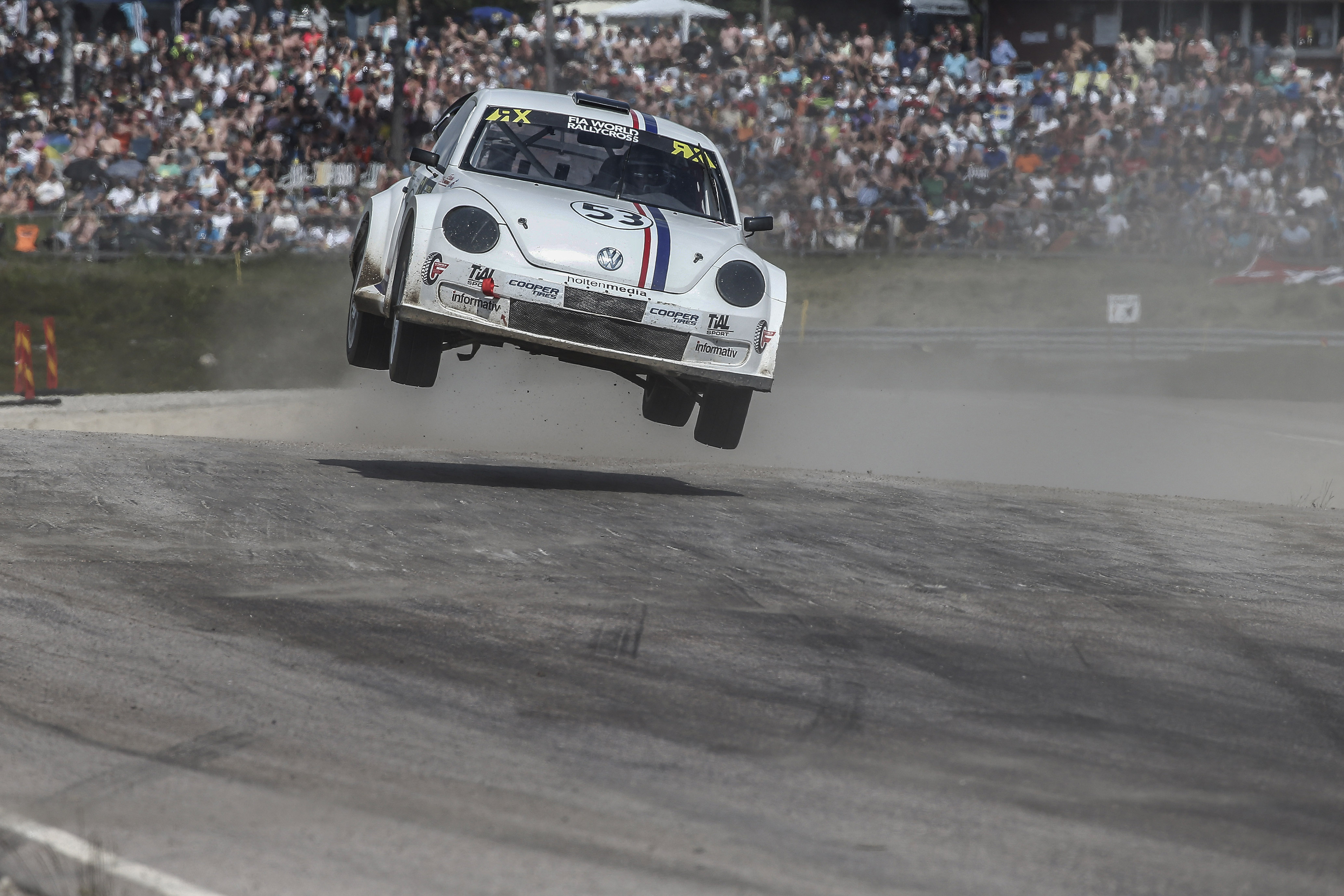
Daniel Holten at the 2015 World RX of Sweden

Since 2010 the Swedish motor racing team Per Eklund Motorsport has competed in rallycross events: the FIA World Rallycross Championship, the FIA European Rallycross Championship and the Global Rallycross Championship. Drivers on the team include Per Eklund, Ramona Karlsson, Henning Solberg, Toomas Heikkinen, Alexander Hvaal and Samuel Hübinette.

== Racing record ==
=== Complete FIA World Rallycross Championship results ===
(key)

==== Supercar ====
Year	Entrant	Car	No.	Driver	1	2	3	4	5	6	7	8	9	10	11	12	13	WRX	Points	Teams	Points
2014	Per Eklund Motorsport	Saab 9-3	47	(Sweden) Ramona Karlsson	POR; 11	GBR; 30	NOR; 30	FIN	SWE; 26	BEL	CAN	FRA	GER	ITA	TUR	ARG		38th	8	N/A	N/A
2014	Per Eklund Motorsport	Saab 9-3	88	(Norway) Henning Solberg	POR	GBR; 9	NOR; 5	FIN	SWE; 13	BEL; 15	CAN	FRA	GER	ITA	TUR	ARG		10th	70	N/A	N/A
2014	Per Eklund Motorsport	Saab 9-3	101	(Sweden) Per Eklund	POR	GBR	NOR	FIN	SWE	BEL	CAN	FRA	GER; 30	ITA	TUR	ARG		57th	0	N/A	N/A
2014	Per Eklund Motorsport	Saab 9-3	105	(Sweden) Linus Westman	POR	GBR	NOR	FIN	SWE	BEL	CAN	FRA	GER	ITA; 19	TUR	ARG		57th	0	N/A	N/A
2015	Eklund Motorsport	Volkswagen Beetle	53	(Norway) Daniel Holten	POR	HOC	BEL	GBR	GER	SWE; 19	CAN	NOR; 20	FRA	ESP	TUR	ITA	ARG	40th	0	N/A	N/A
2015	Eklund Motorsport	Volkswagen Beetle	88	(Norway) Henning Solberg	POR	HOC	BEL	GBR	GER	SWE	CAN	NOR	FRA	ESP; 14	TUR	ITA; 15	ARG	25th	12	N/A	N/A
2015	Eklund Motorsport	Saab 9-3	101	(Sweden) Per Eklund	POR	HOC	BEL	GBR	GER	SWE; 24	CAN	NOR	FRA	ESP	TUR	ITA	ARG	40th	0	N/A	N/A
2016	Eklund Motorsport	Volkswagen Beetle	53	(Norway) Alexander Hvaal	POR	HOC	BEL	GBR	NOR	SWE	CAN	FRA	BAR	LAT	GER; 22	ARG		39th	0	N/A	N/A
2016	Eklund Motorsport	Mitsubishi Mirage	60	(Finland) Joni-Pekka Rajala	POR	HOC	BEL	GBR	NOR	SWE	CAN	FRA	BAR	LAT	GER; 20	ARG		34th	0	N/A	N/A

=== Complete FIA European Rallycross Championship results ===
(key)

==== Division 1 ====
Year	Entrant	Car	No.	Driver	1	2	3	4	5	6	7	8	9	10	ERX	Points
2010	Eklund Motorsport	Saab 9-3	14	(Sweden) Per Eklund	POR	FRA	GBR	HUN	SWE; 14	FIN; 15	BEL	GER	POL; 15	CZE; 10	22nd	14
2010	Eklund Motorsport	Saab 9-3	93	(Finland) Toomas Heikkinen	POR	FRA	GBR	HUN	SWE	FIN; 13	BEL	GER	POL; 9	CZE; 11	19th	18

==== Supercar ====
Year	Entrant	Car	No.	Driver	1	2	3	4	5	6	7	8	9	10	ERX	Points
2011	Eklund Motorsport	Saab 9-3	14	(Finland) Toomas Heikkinen	GBR; 6	POR; NC	FRA; 8	NOR; 5	SWE; 3	BEL; 7	NED; 7	AUT; 10	POL; 4	CZE; 14	6th	87
2011	Eklund Motorsport	Saab 9-3	48	(Sweden) Per Eklund	GBR	POR	FRA	NOR	SWE; 24	BEL	NED	AUT	POL	CZE; 7	22nd	10
2013	Eklund Motorsport	Saab 9-3	39	(Sweden) Per Eklund	GBR	POR	HUN	FIN	NOR	SWE	FRA	AUT	GER; 17		45th	0
2013	Eklund Motorsport	Saab 9-3	53	(Finland) Toni Lukander	GBR	POR	HUN	FIN; 15	NOR	SWE; 12	FRA	AUT	GER		30th	9
2014	Per Eklund Motorsport	Saab 9-3	47	(Sweden) Ramona Karlsson	GBR; 18	NOR; 19	BEL	GER	ITA						37th	0
2014	Per Eklund Motorsport	Saab 9-3	88	(Norway) Henning Solberg	GBR; 5	NOR; 4	BEL; 7	GER	ITA						2nd	56
2014	Per Eklund Motorsport	Saab 9-3	101	(Sweden) Per Eklund	GBR	NOR	BEL	GER; 22	ITA						37th	0
2014	Per Eklund Motorsport	Saab 9-3	105	(Sweden) Linus Westman	GBR	NOR	BEL	GER	ITA; 11						30th	6
2015	Eklund Motorsport	Saab 9-3	60	(Finland) Joni-Pekka Rajala	BEL; 7	GER; 5	NOR; 2	BAR; 3	ITA; 8						4th	86
2016	Eklund Motorsport	Volkswagen Beetle	53	(Norway) Alexander Hvaal	BEL; 10	NOR; 13	SWE; 5	BAR; 8	LAT; 9						8th	50
2016	Eklund Motorsport	Volkswagen Beetle	60	(Finland) Joni-Pekka Rajala	BEL; 6	NOR; 9	SWE; 15	BAR; 20	LAT; 18						10th	33
2017	Eklund Motorsport	Volkswagen Beetle	39	(Sweden) Philip Gehrman	BAR	NOR	SWE; 19	FRA	LAT; 11						19th	8
2017	Eklund Motorsport	Volkswagen Beetle	73	(Norway) Henning Solberg	BAR; 6	NOR; 12	SWE; 14	FRA	LAT						12th	23
2018	Eklund Motorsport	Volkswagen Beetle	76	(Sweden) Philip Gehrman	BAR; 4	BEL; 17	SWE; 20	FRA	LAT						12th*	19*
2018	Eklund Motorsport	Volkswagen Beetle	86	(Norway) Andreas Bråten	BAR; 15	BEL; 6	SWE; 11	FRA	LAT						11th*	20*

^{*} Season still in progress.

=== Complete Global RallyCross Championship results ===
==== Supercar ====
Year	Entrant	Car	No.	Driver	1	2	3	4	5	6	GRC	Points
2012	Scott-Eklund Racing	Saab 9-3	26	(United Kingdom) Andy Scott	CHA; 4	TEX; 8	LA; 11	NH; 6	LVS; 12	LVC; 4	11th	38
2012	Scott-Eklund Racing	Saab 9-3	77	(Sweden) Samuel Hübinette	CHA; 5	TEX; 7	LA; 9	NH; 2	LVS; 12	LVC; 4	3rd	63
