= Marklund Motorsport =

Auto racing team

(Sweden) Marklund Motorsport
- Founded: 2011
- Team principal(s): Jan Marklund
- Current series: FIA European Rallycross Championship
- Former series: FIA World Rallycross Championship
- Current drivers: 92. (Sweden) Anton Marklund
- Noted drivers: (Sweden) Mattias Ekström (United States) Tanner Foust (Finland) Toomas Heikkinen

Marklund Motorsport, also competed under the title Volkswagen Marklund Motorsport, is an auto racing team. The team has been competing in rallycross since its foundation, and has recently been backed by Volkswagen. For 2016 the team merged with Kristoffersson Motorsport to create Volkswagen RX Sweden, before stepping back to the European circuit following the fallout from the Volkswagen emissions scandal.

== Racing record ==
=== Complete FIA World Rallycross Championship results ===
(key)

==== Supercar ====
Year	Entrant	Car	No.	Driver	1	2	3	4	5	6	7	8	9	10	11	12	13	WRX	Points	Teams	Points
2014	Marklund Motorsport	Volkswagen Polo	57	(Finland) Toomas Heikkinen	POR; 4	GBR; 4	NOR; 7	FIN; 7	SWE; 8	BEL; 1	CAN; 5	FRA; 10	GER; 5	ITA; 8	TUR; 3	ARG; 5		2nd	221	2nd	394
2014	Marklund Motorsport	Volkswagen Polo	92	(Sweden) Anton Marklund	POR; 5	GBR; 12	NOR; 8	FIN; 5	SWE; 14	BEL; 4	CAN; 2	FRA; 8	GER; 17	ITA; 6	TUR; 4	ARG; 7		6th	173	2nd	394
2014	Marklund Motorsport	Volkswagen Polo	34	(United States) Tanner Foust	POR	GBR; 5	NOR	FIN; 1	SWE	BEL	CAN; 18	FRA	GER	ITA	TUR	ARG		13th	42	N/A	N/A
2014	Marklund Motorsport	Volkswagen Polo	67	(Belgium) François Duval	POR	GBR	NOR	FIN	SWE	BEL; 16	CAN	FRA	GER	ITA	TUR	ARG		55th	1	N/A	N/A
2014	Marklund Motorsport	Volkswagen Polo	82	(Canada) Patrick Carpentier	POR	GBR	NOR	FIN	SWE	BEL	CAN; 6	FRA	GER	ITA	TUR	ARG		30th	13	N/A	N/A
2014	Marklund Motorsport	Volkswagen Polo	90	(Germany) Ronny Wechselberger	POR	GBR	NOR	FIN	SWE	BEL	CAN	FRA	GER; 19	ITA	TUR	ARG		57th	0	N/A	N/A
2015	Marklund Motorsport	Volkswagen Polo	34	(United States) Tanner Foust	POR	HOC; 9	BEL	GBR; 16	GER	SWE	CAN; 3	NOR	FRA	BAR; 5	TUR	ITA	ARG	15th	44	6th	236
2015	Marklund Motorsport	Volkswagen Polo	45	(Sweden) Per-Gunnar Andersson	POR; 6	HOC; 12	BEL; 4	GBR; 13	GER; 14	SWE; 16	CAN	NOR; 5	FRA; 13	BAR	TUR; 20	ITA; 14	ARG	13th	70	6th	236
2015	Marklund Motorsport	Volkswagen Polo	57	(Finland) Toomas Heikkinen	POR; 8	HOC; 4	BEL; 1	GBR; 15	GER; 13	SWE; 4	CAN; 2	NOR; 19	FRA; 9	BAR; 8	TUR; 14	ITA; 13	ARG; 9	9th	137	6th	236
2015	Marklund Motorsport	Volkswagen Polo	100	(Norway) Thomas Bryntesson	POR	HOC	BEL	GBR	GER	SWE	CAN	NOR	FRA	ESP	TUR	ITA	ARG; 16	34th	1	6th	236
2015	HTB Racing-Marklund Motorsport	Volkswagen Polo	24	(Norway) Tommy Rustad	POR	HOC	BEL	GBR	GER	SWE; 12	CAN; 4†	NOR	FRA	BAR	TUR	ITA	ARG	18th	24	N/A	N/A
2018	Marklund Motorsport	Volkswagen Polo	92	(Sweden) Anton Marklund	BAR	POR	BEL	GBR; 17	NOR; 11	SWE	CAN	FRA	LAT	USA	GER	RSA		16th*	7*	N/A	N/A
2018	HTB Racing-Marklund Motorsport	Volkswagen Polo	24	(Norway) Tommy Rustad	BAR	POR	BEL	GBR; 11	NOR; 13	SWE	CAN	FRA	LAT	USA	GER	RSA		15th*	13*	N/A	N/A

† Points scored with other team(s).

=== Complete FIA European Rallycross Championship results ===
(key)

==== Touringcar ====
Year	Entrant	Car	No.	Driver	1	2	3	4	5	6	7	8	9	10	ERX	Points
2011	Marklund Motorsport	Ford Fiesta	31	(Sweden) Anton Marklund	GBR	POR	FRA	NOR; 10	SWE; 3	BEL; 11	NED; 5	AUT	POL	CZE; 4	8th	53
2012	Marklund Motorsport	Ford Fiesta	8	(Sweden) Anton Marklund	GBR; 1	FRA; 2	AUT; 2	HUN; 2	NOR (6)	SWE; 2	BEL; 2	NED; 1	FIN; 2	GER (7)	1st	142

==== Supercar ====
Year	Entrant	Car	No.	Driver	1	2	3	4	5	6	7	8	9	ERX	Points
2013	Marklund Motorsport	Volkswagen Polo	68	(Sweden) Mattias Ekström	GBR	POR	HUN	FIN	NOR	SWE; 2	FRA	AUT	GER	17th	23
2013	Marklund Motorsport	Volkswagen Polo	92	(Sweden) Anton Marklund	GBR; 7	POR; 9	HUN; 8	FIN; 9	NOR; 7	SWE; 21	FRA; 13	AUT; 7	GER; 9	7th	102
2014	Marklund Motorsport	Volkswagen Polo	34	(United States) Tanner Foust	GBR; 3	NOR	BEL	GER	ITA					18th	14
2014	Marklund Motorsport	Volkswagen Polo	67	(Belgium) François Duval	GBR	NOR	BEL; 8	GER	ITA					24th	9
2014	Marklund Motorsport	Volkswagen Polo	90	(Germany) Ronny Wechselberger	GBR	NOR	BEL	GER; 12	ITA					31st	5
2015	HTB Racing-Marklund Motorsport	Volkswagen Polo	24	(Norway) Tommy Rustad	BEL; 4	GER; 1	NOR; 1	BAR; 6	ITA; 1					1st	135
2017	Marklund Motorsport	Volkswagen Polo	19	(Sweden) Magda Andersson	BAR; 28	NOR; 15	SWE; 12	FRA; 9	LAT; 19					16th	19
2017	Marklund Motorsport	Volkswagen Polo	92	(Sweden) Anton Marklund	BAR; 1	NOR; 2	SWE; 1	FRA; 4	LAT; 1					1st	129
2018	Marklund Motorsport	Volkswagen Polo	92	(Sweden) Anton Marklund	BAR; 2	BEL; 1	SWE	FRA	LAT					2nd*	53*

^{*} Season still in progress.

=== Complete Global RallyCross Championship results ===
==== Supercar ====
Year	Entrant	Car	No.	Driver	Rounds
2013	Marklund Motorsport	Volkswagen Polo	29	(United States) Buddy Rice	1
2013	Marklund Motorsport	Volkswagen Polo	92	(Sweden) Anton Marklund	1–3, 6
2013	Marklund Motorsport	Volkswagen Polo		(Sweden) Mattias Ekström	2–3
2013	Marklund Motorsport	Volkswagen Polo		(Russia) Timur Timerzyanov (Note: Entry listing associated with Marklund Motorsport is unclear from the source available; may reflect a shared or split entry rather than a standalone Marklund Motorsport drive.)	6
