= 2014 World RX of Norway =

Rallycross event

- Round 3 of 12 in the 2014 FIA World Rallycross Championship
- Date: 14-15 June 2014
- Location: Hell, Nord-Trøndelag
- Venue: Lånkebanen

Results
Heat winners
- Heat 1: (Latvia) Reinis Nitišs; Olsbergs MSE
- Heat 2: (United Kingdom) Liam Doran; Monster Energy World RX
- Heat 3: (United Kingdom) Liam Doran; Monster Energy World RX
- Heat 4: (Norway) Petter Solberg; PSRX
Semi-final winners
- Semi-final 1: (Norway) Petter Solberg; PSRX
- Semi-final 2: (Latvia) Reinis Nitišs; Olsbergs MSE
Final
- First: (Latvia) Reinis Nitišs; Olsbergs MSE
- Second: (Norway) Petter Solberg; PSRX
- Third: (United States) Ken Block; Hoonigan Racing Division

World RX layout of Lånkebanen

The 2014 World RX of Norway was the third round of twelve in the inaugural season of the FIA World Rallycross Championship.

== Heats ==
Entries below the red line were eliminated at the conclusion of the heats.

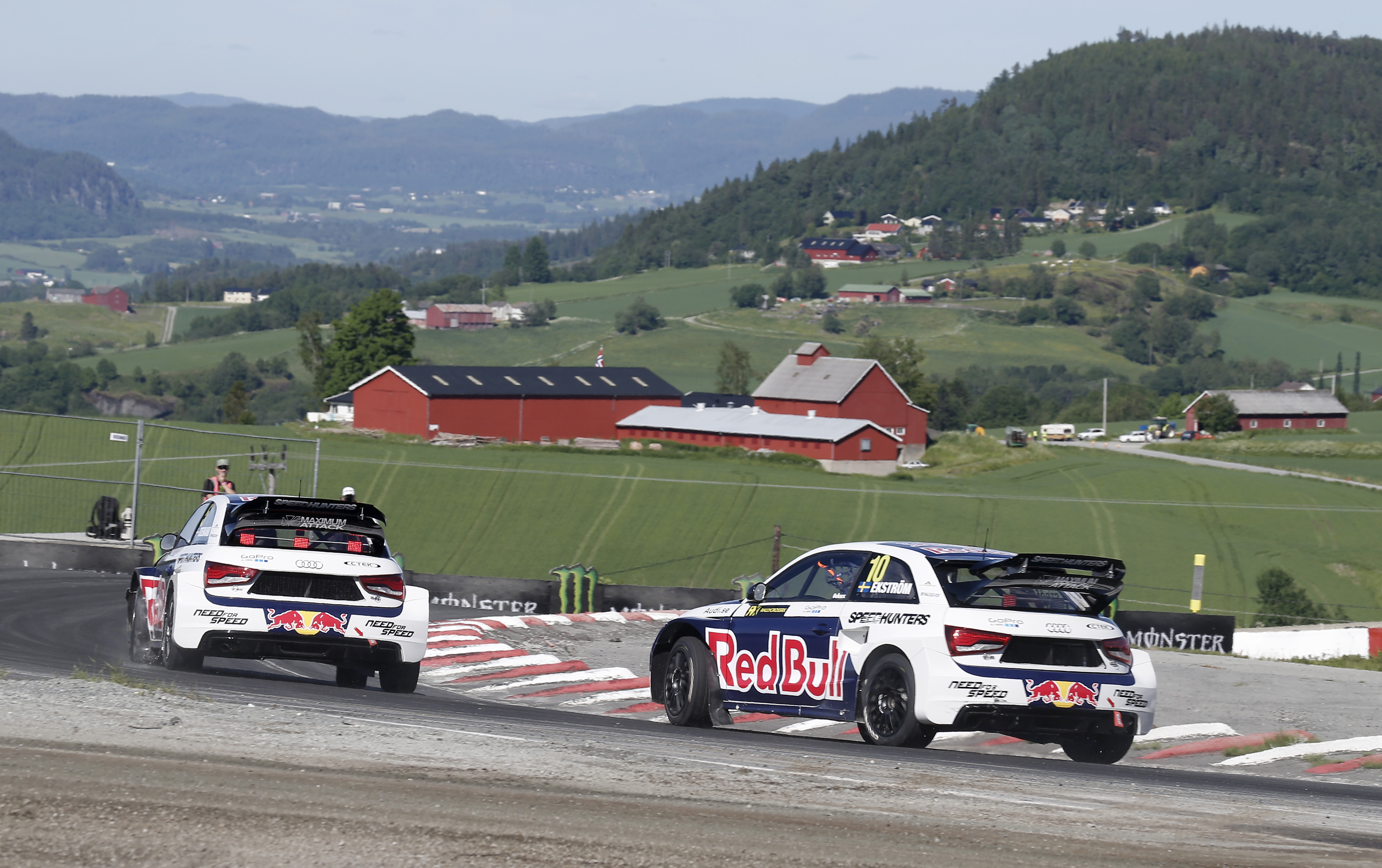
The EKS RX team made their debut with driver-owner Mattias Ekström and Pontus Tidemand racing Audi S1s

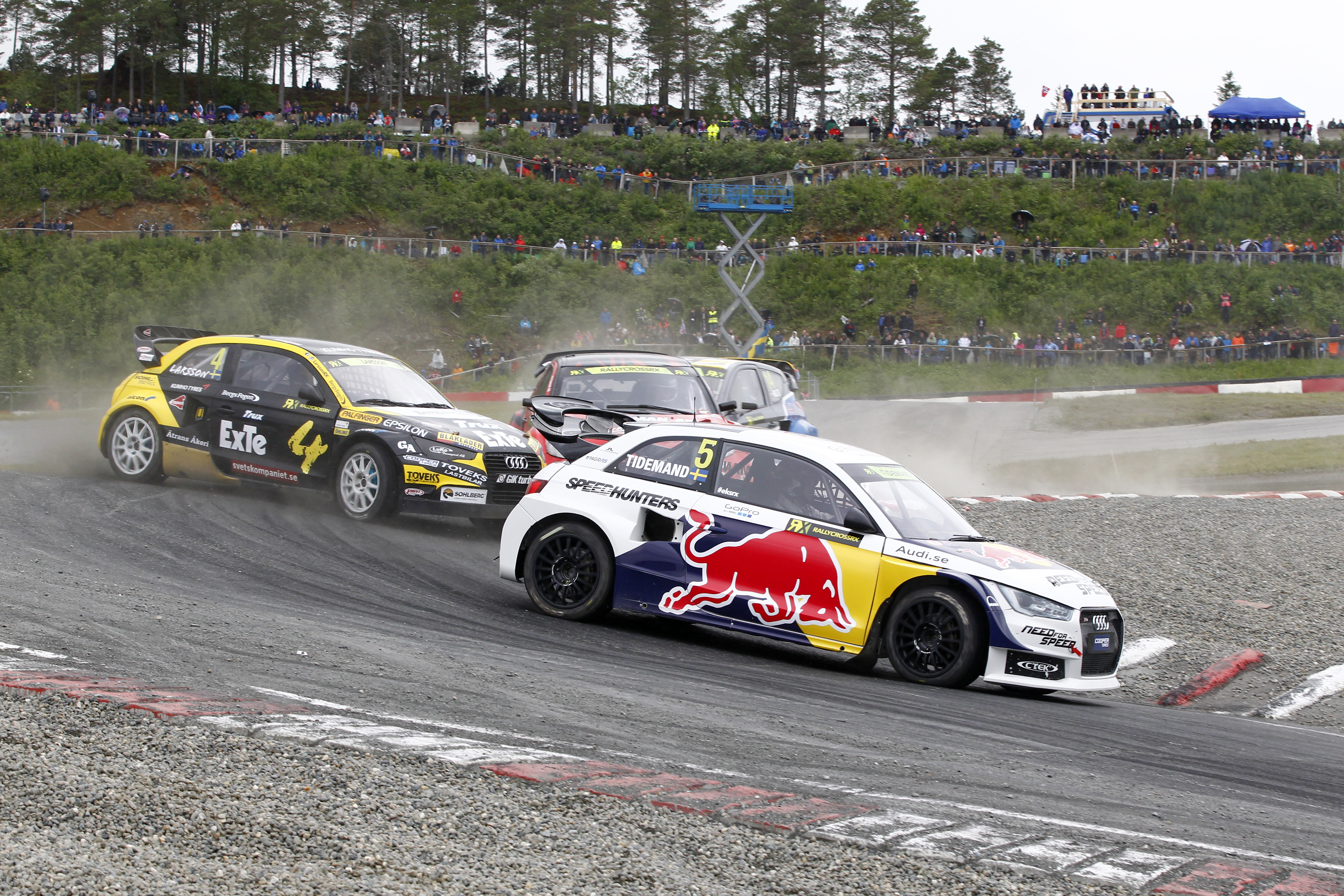
Tidemand, Robin Larsson, Emil Öhman and Frode Holte

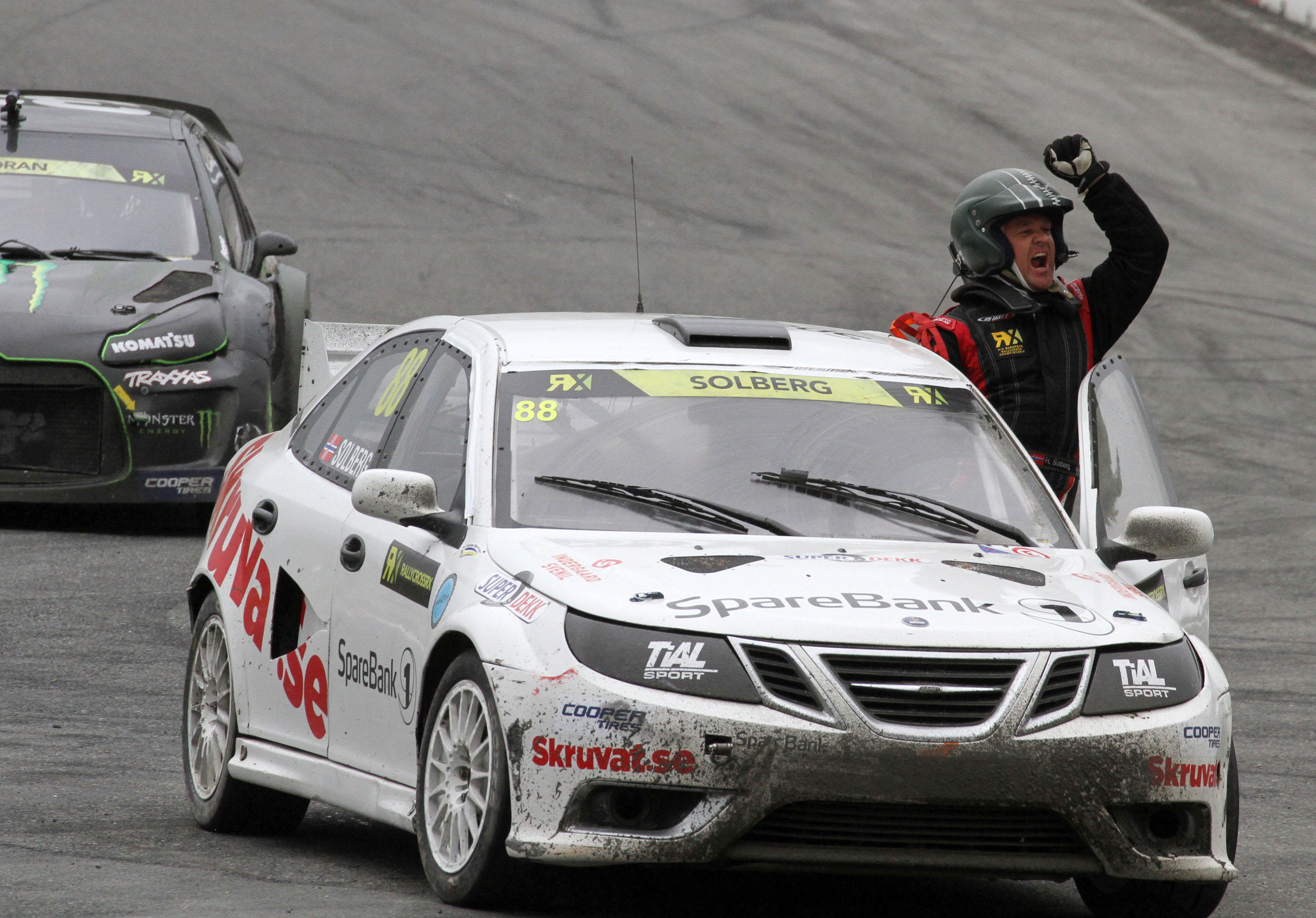
Henning Solberg celebrates having advanced through to the final

| Pos. | No. | Driver | Team | Car | H1 | H2 | H3 | H4 | Pts |
|---|---|---|---|---|---|---|---|---|---|
| 1 | 33 | (United Kingdom) Liam Doran | Monster Energy World RX | Citroën DS3 | 4th | 1st | 1st | 7th | 16 |
| 2 | 15 | (Latvia) Reinis Nitišs | Olsbergs MSE | Ford Fiesta ST | 1st | 2nd | 8th | 4th | 15 |
| 3 | 1 | (Russia) Timur Timerzyanov | Team Peugeot-Hansen | Peugeot 208 T16 | 6th | 4th | 2nd | 3rd | 14 |
| 4 | 57 | (Finland) Toomas Heikkinen | Marklund Motorsport | Volkswagen Polo | 2nd | 5th | 12th | 2nd | 13 |
| 5 | 11 | (Norway) Petter Solberg | PSRX | Citroën DS3 | 15th | 3rd | 6th | 1st | 12 |
| 6 | 3 | (Sweden) Timmy Hansen | Team Peugeot-Hansen | Peugeot 208 T16 | 3rd | 13th | 5th | 5th | 11 |
| 7 | 92 | (Sweden) Anton Marklund | Marklund Motorsport | Volkswagen Polo | 8th | 7th | 3rd | 21st | 10 |
| 8 | 43 | (United States) Ken Block | Hoonigan Racing Division | Ford Fiesta ST | 21st | 6th | 7th | 16th | 9 |
| 9 | 73 | (Norway) Daniel Holten | Olsbergs MSE | Ford Fiesta ST | 7th | 29th | 11th | 6th | 8 |
| 10 | 7 | (Sweden) Emil Öhman | Öhman Racing | Citroën DS3 | 10th | 9th | 18th | 17th | 7 |
| 11 | 88 | (Norway) Henning Solberg | Eklund Motorsport | Saab 9-3 | 14th | 19th | 9th | 13th | 6 |
| 12 | 13 | (Norway) Andreas Bakkerud | Olsbergs MSE | Ford Fiesta ST | 31st | 12th | 4th | 11th | 5 |
| 13 | 8 | (Sweden) Peter Hedström | Hedströms Motorsport | Škoda Fabia | 11th | 11th | 26th | 12th | 4 |
| 14 | 5 | (Sweden) Pontus Tidemand | EKS RX | Audi S1 | 16th | 8th | 20th | 19th | 3 |
| 15 | 25 | (Canada) Jacques Villeneuve | Albatec Racing | Peugeot 208 | 9th | 16th | 14th | 26th | 2 |
| 16 | 24 | (Norway) Tommy Rustad | HTB Racing | Volvo C30 | 12th | DNF | 10th | 10th | 1 |
| 17 | 48 | (Sweden) Lukas Walfridson | Helmia Motorsport | Renault Clio | 17th | 14th | 23rd | 14th | |
| 18 | 99 | (Norway) Tord Linnerud | Helmia Motorsport | Renault Clio | 24th | 17th | 13th | 18th | |
| 19 | 44 | (Poland) Krzysztof Skorupski | Monster Energy World RX | Citroën DS3 | 13th | 15th | DNF | 9th | |
| 20 | 10 | (Sweden) Mattias Ekström | EKS RX | Audi S1 | 19th | 22nd | 30th | 8th | |
| 21 | 4 | (Sweden) Robin Larsson | Larsson Jernberg Motorsport | Audi A1 | DNS | 10th | 17th | 15th | |
| 22 | 32 | (Norway) Ole-Kristian Nøttveit | Ole-Kristian Nøttveit | Volvo C30 | 23rd | 24th | 19th | 23rd | |
| 23 | 12 | (Norway) Alexander Hvaal | PSRX | Citroën DS3 | 20th | 21st | 15th | DNF | |
| 24 | 14 | (Norway) Frode Holte | Frode Holte Motorsport | Hyundai i20 | 25th | 27th | 16th | 25th | |
| 25 | 74 | (France) Jérôme Grosset-Janin | Jérôme Grosset-Janin | Renault Clio | 5th | 18th | DNF | DNF | |
| 26 | 66 | (Republic of Ireland) Derek Tohill | LD Motorsports World RX | Citroën DS3 | 30th | 20th | 31st | 20th | |
| 27 | 37 | (Czech Republic) Pavel Koutný | Czech National Team | Ford Fiesta | 22nd | 28th | 24th | DNF | |
| 28 | 30 | (Norway) Morten Bergminrud | Morten Bergminrud | Citroën C4 | 33rd | 23rd | DNF | 22nd | |
| 29 | 54 | (Belgium) Jos Jansen | JJ Racing | Ford Focus | 29th | 32nd | 29th | 24th | |
| 30 | 36 | (Norway) Stein Egil Jenssen | Stein Egil Jenssen | Ford Focus | 32nd | 25th | 22nd | DNF | |
| 31 | 47 | (Sweden) Ramona Karlsson | Eklund Motorsport | Saab 9-3 | DNF | 31st | 21st | 28th | |
| 32 | 17 | (Sweden) Mats Öhman | Öhman Racing | Citroën DS3 | 28th | 26th | 27th | DNF | |
| 33 | 22 | (Belgium) Koen Pauwels | Koen Pauwels | Ford Focus | 18th | 30th | 28th | 35th | |
| 34 | 35 | (Norway) Ole Håbjørg | Ole Håbjørg | Renault Clio | 27th | DNF | DNF | 27th | |
| 35 | 31 | (Norway) Tore Kristoffersen | Tore Kristoffersen | Ford Fiesta | 26th | DNF | 25th | DNS | |

== Semi-finals ==
Drivers below the red line were eliminated at the conclusion of the semi-finals.

=== Semi-final 1 ===
| Pos. | No. | Driver | Team | Time | Pts |
|---|---|---|---|---|---|
| 1 | 11 | (Norway) Petter Solberg | PSRX | 4:10.379 | 6 |
| 2 | 1 | (Russia) Timur Timerzyanov | Team Peugeot-Hansen | +0.168 | 5 |
| 3 | 88 | (Norway) Henning Solberg | Eklund Motorsport | +3.170 | 4 |
| 4 | 92 | (Sweden) Anton Marklund | Marklund Motorsport | +3.525 | 3 |
| 5 | 33 | (United Kingdom) Liam Doran | Monster Energy World RX | +10.740 | 2 |
| 6 | 73 | (Norway) Daniel Holten | Olsbergs MSE | +38.274 | 1 |

=== Semi-final 2 ===
| Pos. | No. | Driver | Team | Time | Pts |
|---|---|---|---|---|---|
| 1 | 15 | (Latvia) Reinis Nitišs | Olsbergs MSE | 4:23.132 | 6 |
| 2 | 3 | (Sweden) Timmy Hansen | Team Peugeot-Hansen | +0.014 | 5 |
| 3 | 43 | (United States) Ken Block | Hoonigan Racing Division | +2.306 | 4 |
| 4 | 57 | (Finland) Toomas Heikkinen | Marklund Motorsport | +3.667 | 3 |
| 5 | 13 | (Norway) Andreas Bakkerud | Olsbergs MSE | +5.921 | 2 |
| 6 | 7 | (Sweden) Emil Öhman | Öhman Racing | DNF | 1 |

== Final ==
| Pos. | No. | Driver | Team | Time | Pts |
|---|---|---|---|---|---|
| 1 | 15 | (Latvia) Reinis Nitišs | Olsbergs MSE | 4:07.165 | 8 |
| 2 | 11 | (Norway) Petter Solberg | PSRX | +0.988 | 5 |
| 3 | 43 | (United States) Ken Block | Hoonigan Racing Division | +3.892 | 4 |
| 4 | 1 | (Russia) Timur Timerzyanov | Team Peugeot-Hansen | +5.374 | 3 |
| 5 | 88 | (Norway) Henning Solberg | Eklund Motorsport | +9.875 | 2 |
| 6 | 3 | (Sweden) Timmy Hansen | Team Peugeot-Hansen | +43.216 | 1 |

== Championship standings after the event ==
| Pos. | Driver | Points |
|---|---|---|
| 1 | (Latvia) Reinis Nitišs | 72 |
| 2 | (Norway) Petter Solberg | 69 |
| 3 | (Finland) Toomas Heikkinen | 60 |
| 4 | (Norway) Andreas Bakkerud | 56 |
| 5 | (Russia) Timur Timerzyanov | 41 |

| Previous race: 2014 World RX of Great Britain | FIA World Rallycross Championship; 2014 season | Next race: 2014 World RX of Finland |
| Previous race: None | World RX of Norway | Next race: 2015 World RX of Norway |
