= 2014 World RX of Belgium =

Rallycross event

- Round 6 of 12 in the 2014 FIA World Rallycross Championship
- Date: 12-13 July 2014
- Location: Mettet, Wallonia
- Venue: Circuit Jules Tacheny Mettet

Results
Heat winners
- Heat 1: (Sweden) Anton Marklund; Marklund Motorsport
- Heat 2: (Sweden) Johan Kristoffersson; Volkswagen Dealer Team KMS
- Heat 3: (Latvia) Reinis Nitišs; Olsbergs MSE
- Heat 4: (Sweden) Timmy Hansen; Team Peugeot-Hansen
Semi-final winners
- Semi-final 1: (Sweden) Johan Kristoffersson; Volkswagen Dealer Team KMS
- Semi-final 2: (Norway) Petter Solberg; PSRX
Final
- First: (Finland) Toomas Heikkinen; Marklund Motorsport
- Second: (Sweden) Timmy Hansen; Team Peugeot-Hansen
- Third: (Sweden) Johan Kristoffersson; Volkswagen Dealer Team KMS

World RX layout of Circuit Jules Tacheny Mettet

The 2014 World RX of Belgium was the 6th round of the inaugural season of the FIA World Rallycross Championship. The event was held at the Circuit Jules Tacheny Mettet in Mettet, Wallonia.

== Heats ==
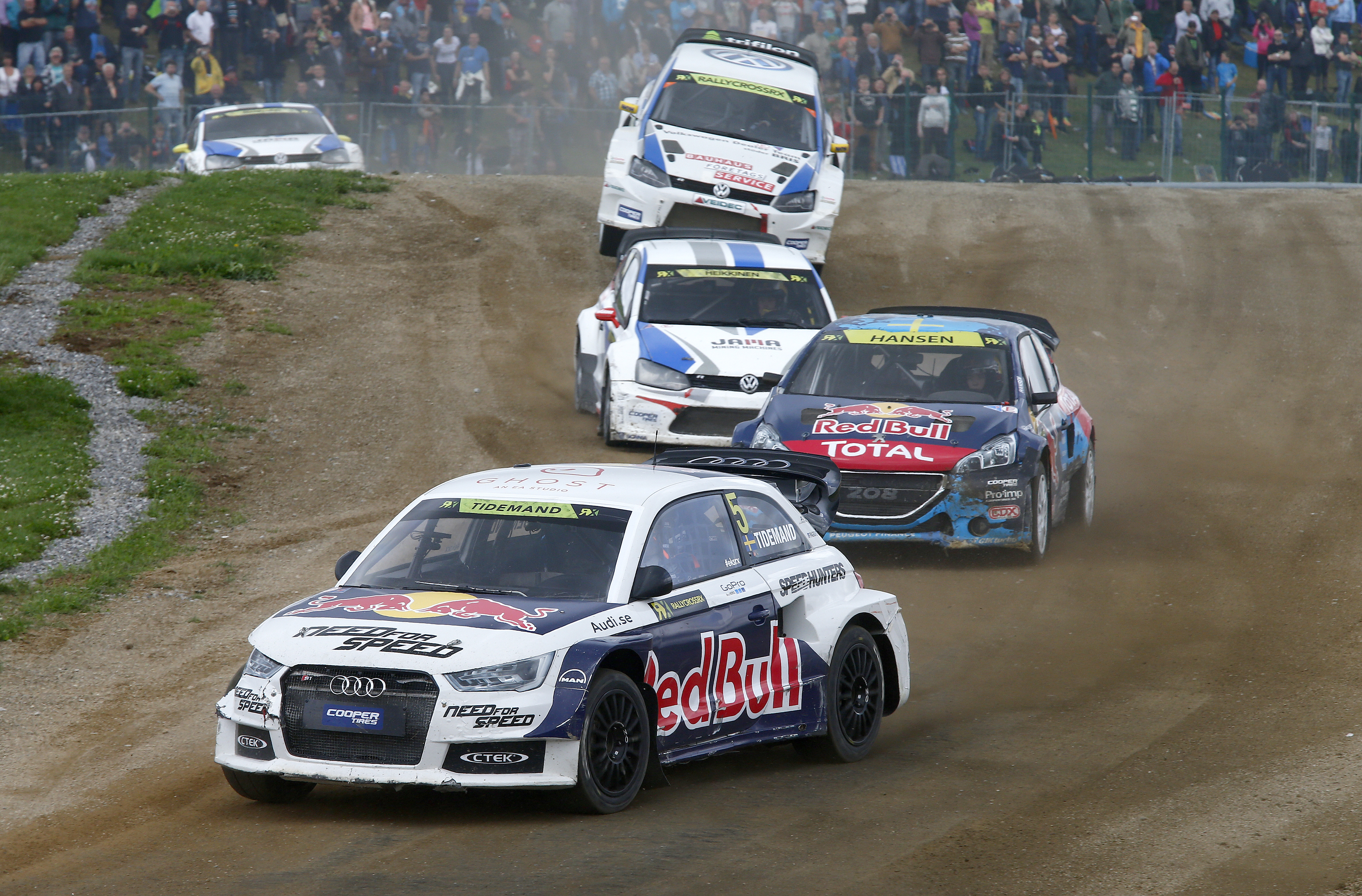
Pontus Tidemand, Timmy Hansen, Toomas Heikkinen and OC Veiby

Pos.	No.	Driver	Team	Car	H1	H2	H3	H4	Pts
1	57	(Finland) Toomas Heikkinen	Marklund Motorsport	Volkswagen Polo	3rd	3rd	3rd	2nd	16
2	92	(Sweden) Anton Marklund	Marklund Motorsport	Volkswagen Polo	1st	2nd	8th	11th	15
3	53	(Sweden) Johan Kristoffersson	Volkswagen Dealer Team KMS	Volkswagen Polo	8th	1st	9th	3rd	14
4	11	(Norway) Petter Solberg	PSRX	Citroën DS3	4th	6th	2nd	4th	13
5	4	(Sweden) Robin Larsson	Larsson Jernberg Motorsport	Audi A1	2nd	5th	6th	14th	12
6	5	(Sweden) Pontus Tidemand	EKS RX	Audi S1	5th	8th	4th	8th	11
7	3	(Sweden) Timmy Hansen	Team Peugeot-Hansen	Peugeot 208 T16	10th	4th	24th	1st	10
8	1	(Russia) Timur Timerzyanov	Team Peugeot-Hansen	Peugeot 208 T16	13th	15th	7th	9th	9
9	15	(Latvia) Reinis Nitišs	Olsbergs MSE	Ford Fiesta ST	6th	28th	1st	13th	8
10	33	(United Kingdom) Liam Doran	Monster Energy World RX	Citroën DS3	18th	18th	13th	6th	7
11	8	(Sweden) Peter Hedström	Hedströms Motorsport	Škoda Fabia	14th	12th	20th	12th	6
12	27	(France) Davy Jeanney	Monster Energy World RX	Citroën DS3	15th	10th	10th	23rd	5
13	79	(Sweden) Edward Sandström	EKS RX	Audi S1	24th	26th	5th	7th	4
14	7	(Sweden) Emil Öhman	Öhman Racing	Citroën DS3	19th	9th	15th	25th	3
15	25	(Canada) Jacques Villeneuve	Albatec Racing	Peugeot 208	17th	16th	14th	22nd	2
16	88	(Norway) Henning Solberg	Eklund Motorsport	Saab 9-3	9th	29th	23rd	5th	1
17	67	(Belgium) François Duval	Marklund Motorsport	Volkswagen Polo	30th	7th	11th	21st	
18	74	(France) Jérôme Grosset-Janin	Jérôme Grosset-Janin	Renault Clio	12th	25th	12th	24th	
19	52	(Norway) Ole Christian Veiby	Volkswagen Dealer Team KMS	Volkswagen Polo	16th	17th	28th	15th	
20	99	(Norway) Tord Linnerud	Helmia Motorsport	Renault Clio	7th	11th	27th	28th	
21	26	(United Kingdom) Andy Scott	Albatec Racing	Peugeot 208	23rd	19th	19th	19th	
22	22	(Belgium) Koen Pauwels	Koen Pauwels	Ford Focus	25th	22nd	21st	16th	
23	24	(Norway) Tommy Rustad	HTB Racing	Volvo C30	11th	30th	17th	26th	
24	6	(France) Alexandre Theuil	Alexandre Theuil	Citroën DS3	31st	14th	22nd	20th	
25	66	(Republic of Ireland) Derek Tohill	LD Motorsports World RX	Citroën DS3	26th	20th	30th	17th	
26	9	(Belgium) Michaël de Keersmaecker	De Bokkenrijders	Volkswagen Scirocco	22nd	13th	18th	30th	
27	37	(Czech Republic) Pavel Koutný	Czech National Team	Ford Fiesta	29th	23rd	25th	18th	
28	48	(Sweden) Lukas Walfridson	Helmia Motorsport	Renault Clio	21st	21st	16th	31st	
29	54	(Belgium) Jos Jansen	JJ Racing	Ford Focus	20th	24th	29th	32nd	
30	13	(Norway) Andreas Bakkerud	Olsbergs MSE	Ford Fiesta ST	27th	31st	31st	10th	
31	70	(Belgium) Patrick van Mechelen	OTRT	Ford Fiesta	28th	32nd	26th	27th	
32	68	(Belgium) Ronny Scheveneels	Ronny Scheveneels	Škoda Fabia	32nd	27th	32nd	29th	

== Semi-finals ==
=== Semi-final 1 ===
Pos.	No.	Driver	Team	Time	Pts
1	53	(Sweden) Johan Kristoffersson	Volkswagen Dealer Team KMS	4:10.693	6
2	57	(Finland) Toomas Heikkinen	Marklund Motorsport	+0.026	5
3	3	(Sweden) Timmy Hansen	Team Peugeot-Hansen	+0.514	4
4	4	(Sweden) Robin Larsson	Larsson Jernberg Motorsport	+1.097	3
5	15	(Latvia) Reinis Nitišs	Olsbergs MSE	+2.147	2
6	8	(Sweden) Peter Hedström	Hedströms Motorsport	+21.502	1

=== Semi-final 2 ===
Pos.	No.	Driver	Team	Time	Pts
1	11	(Norway) Petter Solberg	PSRX	4:07.139	6
2	5	(Sweden) Pontus Tidemand	EKS RX	+2.521	5
3	92	(Sweden) Anton Marklund	Marklund Motorsport	+3.670	4
4	1	(Russia) Timur Timerzyanov	Team Peugeot-Hansen	+5.736	3
5	27	(France) Davy Jeanney	Monster Energy World RX	DNF	2
6	33	(United Kingdom) Liam Doran	Monster Energy World RX	DNF	1

== Final ==
Pos.	No.	Driver	Team	Time	Pts
1	57	(Finland) Toomas Heikkinen	Marklund Motorsport	4:05.840	8
2	3	(Sweden) Timmy Hansen	Team Peugeot-Hansen	+0.335	5
3	53	(Sweden) Johan Kristoffersson	Volkswagen Dealer Team KMS	+1.148	4
4	11	(Norway) Petter Solberg	PSRX	+2.928	3
5	92	(Sweden) Anton Marklund	Marklund Motorsport	+6.694	2
6	5	(Sweden) Pontus Tidemand	EKS RX	DNF	1

== Championship standings after the event ==
Pos.	Driver	Points
1	(Norway) Petter Solberg	125
2	(Latvia) Reinis Nitišs	122
3	(Finland) Toomas Heikkinen	117
4	(Norway) Andreas Bakkerud	99
5	(Sweden) Anton Marklund	85

Previous race: 2014 World RX of Sweden	FIA World Rallycross Championship; 2014 season	Next race: 2014 World RX of Canada
Previous race: None	World RX of Belgium	Next race: 2015 World RX of Belgium
