= 2014 World RX of Canada =

Rallycross event

- Round 7 of 12 in the 2014 FIA World Rallycross Championship
- Date: 7–8 August 2014
- Location: Trois-Rivières, Quebec
- Venue: Circuit Trois-Rivières

Results
Heat winners
- Heat 1: (Norway) Petter Solberg; PSRX
- Heat 2: (Finland) Joni Wiman; Olsbergs MSE
- Heat 3: (Norway) Petter Solberg; PSRX
- Heat 4: (Norway) Petter Solberg; PSRX
Semi-final winners
- Semi-final 1: (Norway) Petter Solberg; PSRX
- Semi-final 2: (Sweden) Anton Marklund; Marklund Motorsport
Final
- First: (Norway) Petter Solberg; PSRX
- Second: (Sweden) Anton Marklund; Marklund Motorsport
- Third: (Russia) Timur Timerzyanov; Team Peugeot-Hansen

World RX layout of Circuit Trois-Rivières

The 2014 World RX of Canada was the 7th round of the inaugural season of the FIA World Rallycross Championship. The event was held at the Circuit Trois-Rivières in Trois-Rivières, Quebec.

== Heats ==
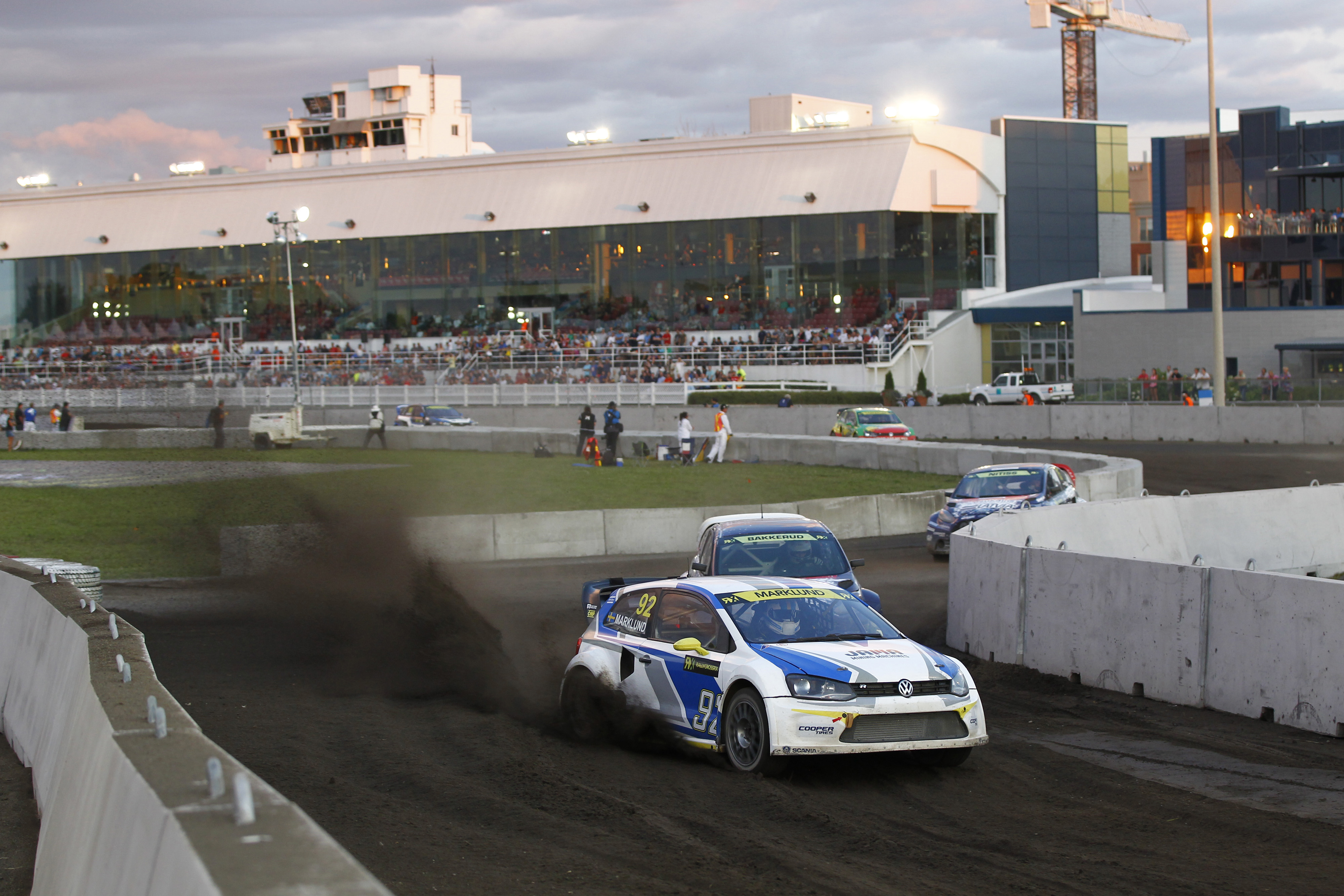
Anton Marklund leads Andreas Bakkerud, Reinis Nitišs, Patrick Carpentier and Sverre Isachsen

Pos.	No.	Driver	Team	Car	H1	H2	H3	H4	Pts
1	11	(Norway) Petter Solberg	PSRX	Citroën DS3	1st	3rd	1st	1st	16
2	92	(Sweden) Anton Marklund	Marklund Motorsport	Volkswagen Polo	3rd	2nd	5th	3rd	15
3	3	(Sweden) Timmy Hansen	Team Peugeot-Hansen	Peugeot 208 T16	4th	8th	2nd	4th	14
4	94	(Finland) Joni Wiman	Olsbergs MSE	Ford Fiesta ST	10th	1st	6th	8th	13
5	57	(Finland) Toomas Heikkinen	Marklund Motorsport	Volkswagen Polo	2nd	4th	7th	11th	12
6	13	(Norway) Andreas Bakkerud	Olsbergs MSE	Ford Fiesta ST	5th	9th	3rd	9th	11
7	27	(France) Davy Jeanney	Monster Energy World RX	Citroën DS3	8th	7th	10th	5th	10
8	88	(Norway) Henning Solberg	Monster Energy World RX	Citroën DS3	14th	5th	11th	6th	9
9	1	(Russia) Timur Timerzyanov	Team Peugeot-Hansen	Peugeot 208 T16	6th	14th	16th	2nd	8
10	82	(Canada) Patrick Carpentier	Marklund Motorsport	Volkswagen Polo	11th	11th	9th	7th	7
11	26	(United Kingdom) Andy Scott	Albatec Racing	Peugeot 208	12th	10th	13th	12th	6
12	96	(Norway) Sverre Isachsen	Subaru Rally Team USA	Subaru Impreza	17th	12th	8th	10th	5
13	15	(Latvia) Reinis Nitišs	Olsbergs MSE	Ford Fiesta ST	16th	16th	4th	13th	4
14	66	(Republic of Ireland) Derek Tohill	LD Motorsports World RX	Citroën DS3	13th	13th	12th	14th	3
15	54	(Belgium) Jos Jansen	JJ Racing	Ford Focus	15th	15th	14th	15th	2
16	25	(Canada) Jacques Villeneuve	Albatec Racing	Peugeot 208	7th	6th	15th	16th	1
17	97	(Estonia) Sten Oja	PSRX	Citroën DS3	9th	17th	17th	17th	
18	34	(United States) Tanner Foust	Marklund Motorsport	Volkswagen Polo	18th	18th	18th	18th	

== Semi-finals ==
=== Semi-final 1 ===
Pos.	No.	Driver	Team	Time	Pts
1	11	(Norway) Petter Solberg	PSRX	5:19.987	6
2	1	(Russia) Timur Timerzyanov	Team Peugeot-Hansen	+4.402	5
3	57	(Finland) Toomas Heikkinen	Marklund Motorsport	+12.559	4
4	27	(France) Davy Jeanney	Monster Energy World RX	+13.453	3
5	26	(United Kingdom) Andy Scott	Albatec Racing	+16.588	2
6	3	(Sweden) Timmy Hansen	Team Peugeot-Hansen	DSQ	1

=== Semi-final 2 ===
Pos.	No.	Driver	Team	Time	Pts
1	92	(Sweden) Anton Marklund	Marklund Motorsport	5:25.982	6
2	82	(Canada) Patrick Carpentier	Marklund Motorsport	+2.194	5
3	15	(Latvia) Reinis Nitišs†	Olsbergs MSE	+2.813	4
4	13	(Norway) Andreas Bakkerud	Olsbergs MSE	+3.106	3
5	96	(Norway) Sverre Isachsen	Subaru Rally Team USA	+7.352	2
6	88	(Norway) Henning Solberg	Monster Energy World RX	DNF	1

† Joni Wiman qualified for the semi-finals, but was unable to take the grid. Reinis Nitišs was allowed to take his place.

== Final ==
Pos.	No.	Driver	Team	Time	Pts
1	11	(Norway) Petter Solberg	PSRX	5:22.550	8
2	92	(Sweden) Anton Marklund	Marklund Motorsport	+2.673	5
3	1	(Russia) Timur Timerzyanov	Team Peugeot-Hansen	+4.614	4
4	15	(Latvia) Reinis Nitišs	Olsbergs MSE	+5.141	3
5	57	(Finland) Toomas Heikkinen	Marklund Motorsport	+6.843	2
6	82	(Canada) Patrick Carpentier	Marklund Motorsport	DNF	1

== Championship standings after the event ==
Pos.	Driver	Points
1	(Norway) Petter Solberg	155
2	(Finland) Toomas Heikkinen	135
3	(Latvia) Reinis Nitišs	133
4	(Norway) Andreas Bakkerud	113
5	(Sweden) Anton Marklund	111

Previous race: 2014 World RX of Belgium	FIA World Rallycross Championship; 2014 season	Next race: 2014 World RX of France
Previous race: None	World RX of Canada	Next race: 2015 World RX of Canada
