= 2015 World RX of Canada =

- Round 7 of 13 in the 2015 FIA World Rallycross Championship
- Date: 7-8 August 2015
- Location: Trois-Rivières, Quebec
- Venue: Circuit Trois-Rivières

Results
Heat winners
- Heat 1: (Sweden) Timmy Hansen; Team Peugeot-Hansen
- Heat 2: (Norway) Petter Solberg; SDRX
- Heat 3: (Sweden) Timmy Hansen; Team Peugeot-Hansen
- Heat 4: (Sweden) Timmy Hansen; Team Peugeot-Hansen
Semi-final winners
- Semi-final 1: (Norway) Tommy Rustad; All-Inkl.com Münnich Motorsport
- Semi-final 2: (France) Davy Jeanney; Team Peugeot-Hansen
Final
- First: (France) Davy Jeanney; Team Peugeot-Hansen
- Second: (Finland) Toomas Heikkinen; Marklund Motorsport
- Third: (United States) Tanner Foust; Marklund Motorsport

World RX layout of Circuit Trois-Rivières

The 2015 World RX of Canada was the seventh round of the second season of the FIA World Rallycross Championship. The event was held at the Circuit Trois-Rivières in Trois-Rivières, Quebec.

== Heats ==
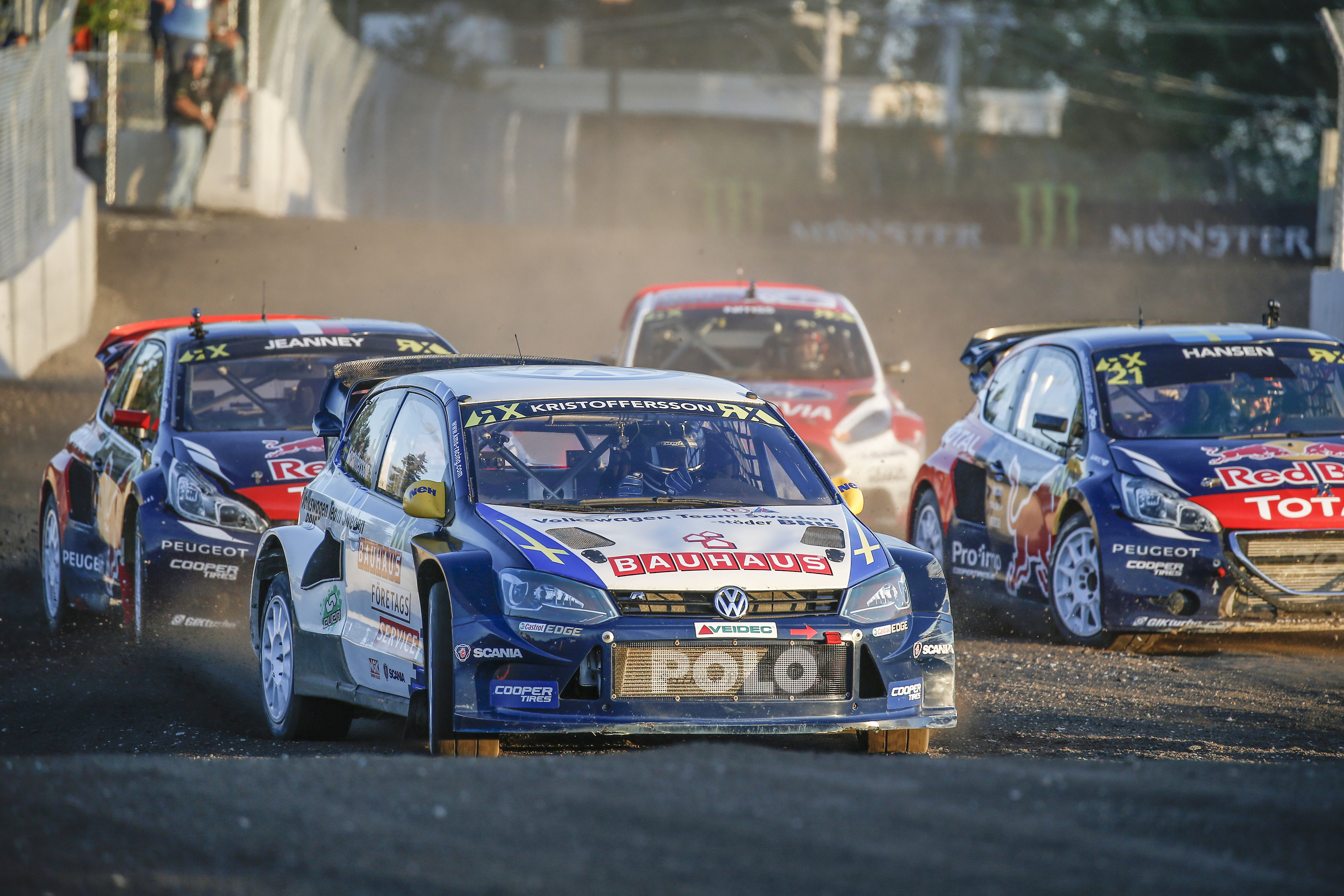
Johan Kristoffersson, Davy Jeanney, Timmy Hansen and Reinis Nitišs

Pos.	No.	Driver	Team	Car	H1	H2	H3	H4	Pts
1	21	(Sweden) Timmy Hansen	Team Peugeot-Hansen	Peugeot 208	1st	2nd	1st	1st	16
2	10	(Sweden) Mattias Ekström	EKS RX	Audi S1	3rd	3rd	2nd	2nd	15
3	1	(Norway) Petter Solberg	SDRX	Citroën DS3	16th	1st	4th	3rd	14
4	17	(France) Davy Jeanney	Team Peugeot-Hansen	Peugeot 208	2nd	7th	6th	7th	13
5	15	(Latvia) Reinis Nitišs	Olsbergs MSE	Ford Fiesta ST	5th	5th	11th	5th	12
6	13	(Norway) Andreas Bakkerud	Olsbergs MSE	Ford Fiesta ST	7th	4th	7th	8th	11
7	57	(Finland) Toomas Heikkinen	Marklund Motorsport	Volkswagen Polo	8th	12th	10th	4th	10
8	7	(Austria) Manfred Stohl	World RX Team Austria	Ford Fiesta	12th	14th	3rd	6th	9
9	34	(United States) Tanner Foust	Marklund Motorsport	Volkswagen Polo	9th	11th	8th	10th	8
10	3	(Sweden) Johan Kristoffersson	Volkswagen Team Sweden	Volkswagen Polo	4th	18th	5th	11th	7
11	24	(Norway) Tommy Rustad	All-Inkl.com Münnich Motorsport	Audi S3	10th	6th	14th	12th	6
12	42	(Russia) Timur Timerzyanov	Namus OMSE	Ford Fiesta ST	6th	9th	17th	14th	5
13	92	(Sweden) Anton Marklund	EKS RX	Volkswagen Polo‡	13th	8th	12th	18th	4
14	82	(Canada) Patrick Carpentier	JRM Racing	BMW MINI Countryman	18th	13th	13th	13th	3
15	33	(United Kingdom) Liam Doran	SDRX	Citroën DS3	19th	10th	18th	9th	2
16	147	(Canada) Louis-Philippe Dumoulin	JRM Racing	BMW MINI Countryman	15th	17th	16th	15th	1
17	70	(Austria) Christoph Brugger	World RX Team Austria	Ford Fiesta	17th	16th	15th	16th	
18	4	(Sweden) Robin Larsson	Larsson Jernberg Racing Team	Audi A1	11th	19th	9th	17th	
19	77	(Germany) René Münnich	All-Inkl.com Münnich Motorsport	Audi S3	14th	15th	19th	19th	
20	99	(Norway) Tord Linnerud	Volkswagen Team Sweden	Volkswagen Polo	20th	20th	20th	20th	

‡ Anton Marklund used a Marklund Motorsport-built Volkswagen Polo this round, as the EKS team were unable to repair his regular Audi S1 in time for shipping following his accident at the previous round.

== Semi-finals ==
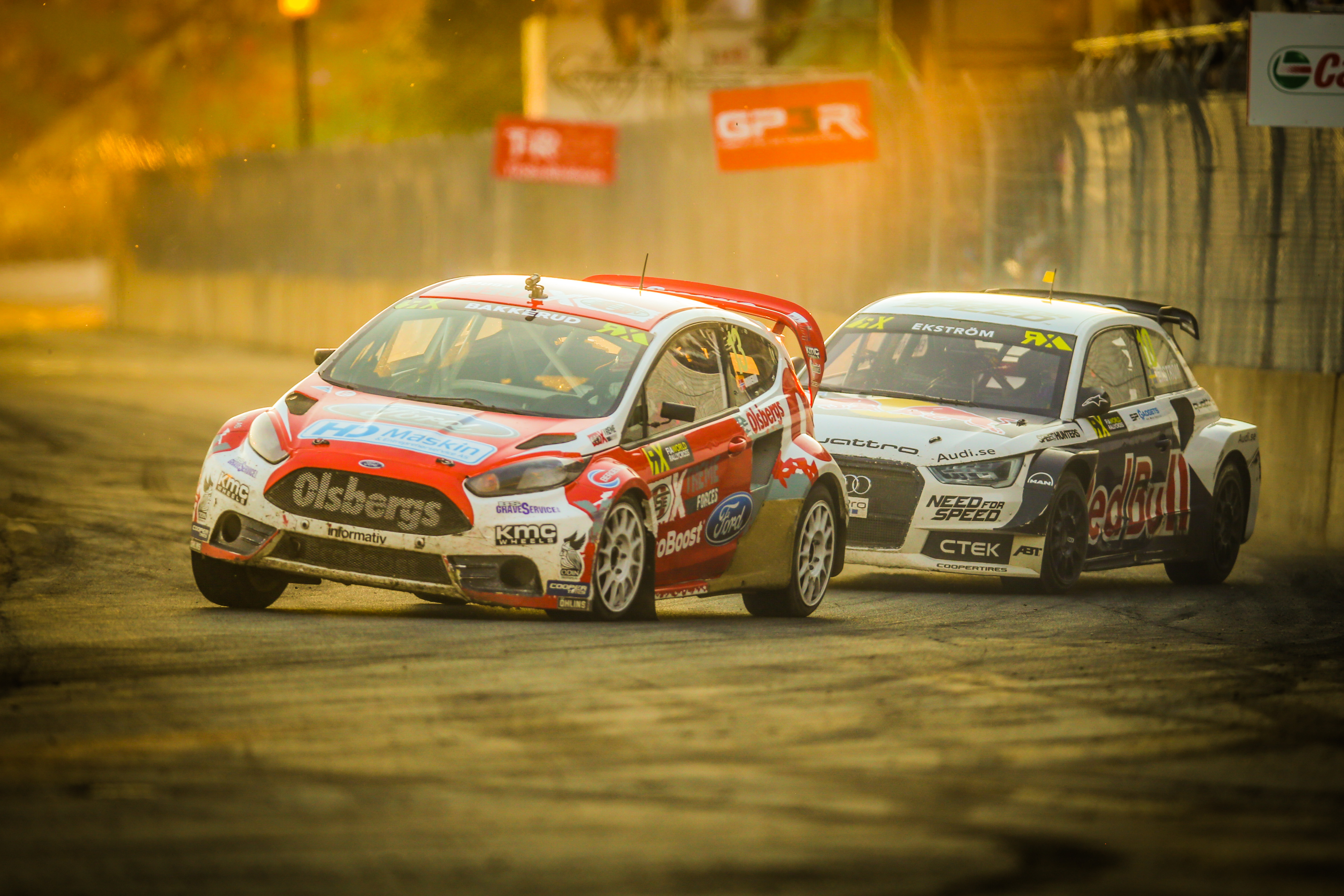
Andreas Bakkerud and Mattias Ekström

=== Semi-final 1 ===
Pos.	No.	Driver	Team	Time	Pts
1	24	(Norway) Tommy Rustad	All-Inkl.com Münnich Motorsport	5:11.625	6
2	57	(Finland) Toomas Heikkinen	Marklund Motorsport	+1.453	5
3	34	(United States) Tanner Foust	Marklund Motorsport	+2.653	4
4	1	(Norway) Petter Solberg	SDRX	+20.352	3
5	21	(Sweden) Timmy Hansen	Team Peugeot-Hansen	DNF	2
6	15	(Latvia) Reinis Nitišs	Olsbergs MSE	DNF	1

=== Semi-final 2 ===
Pos.	No.	Driver	Team	Time	Pts
1	17	(France) Davy Jeanney	Team Peugeot-Hansen	5:02.862	6
2	10	(Sweden) Mattias Ekström	EKS RX	+1.651	5
3	13	(Norway) Andreas Bakkerud	Olsbergs MSE	+3.495	4
4	42	(Russia) Timur Timerzyanov	Namus OMSE	+14.946	3
5	3	(Sweden) Johan Kristoffersson	Volkswagen Team Sweden	+16.308	2
6	7	(Austria) Manfred Stohl	World RX Team Austria	DNF	1

== Final ==
Pos.	No.	Driver	Team	Time	Pts
1	17	(France) Davy Jeanney	Team Peugeot-Hansen	5:03.822	8
2	57	(Finland) Toomas Heikkinen	Marklund Motorsport	+0.252	5
3	34	(United States) Tanner Foust	Marklund Motorsport	+1.666	4
4	24	(Norway) Tommy Rustad	All-Inkl.com Münnich Motorsport	+5.277	3
5	13	(Norway) Andreas Bakkerud	Olsbergs MSE	+6.403	2
6	10	(Sweden) Mattias Ekström	EKS RX	+12.586	1

== Championship standings after the event ==
Pos.	Driver	Points
1	(Norway) Petter Solberg	176
2	(Norway) Andreas Bakkerud	130
3	(Sweden) Johan Kristoffersson	124
4	(Sweden) Timmy Hansen	122
5	(France) Davy Jeanney	115

Previous race: 2015 World RX of Sweden	FIA World Rallycross Championship; 2015 season	Next race: 2015 World RX of Norway
Previous race: 2014 World RX of Canada	World RX of Canada	Next race: 2016 World RX of Canada
