= 2014 World RX of Argentina =

Rallycross event

- Round 12 of 12 in the 2014 FIA World Rallycross Championship
- Date: 28-29 November 2014
- Location: San Luis, Cuyo
- Venue: Autódromo Rosendo Hernández

Results
Heat winners
- Heat 1: (Norway) Petter Solberg; PSRX
- Heat 2: (Latvia) Reinis Nitišs; Olsbergs MSE
- Heat 3: (Finland) Toomas Heikkinen; Marklund Motorsport
- Heat 4: (Norway) Petter Solberg; PSRX
Semi-final winners
- Semi-final 1: (Norway) Petter Solberg; PSRX
- Semi-final 2: (Latvia) Reinis Nitišs; Olsbergs MSE
Final
- First: (Norway) Petter Solberg; PSRX
- Second: (Latvia) Reinis Nitišs; Olsbergs MSE
- Third: (Sweden) Kevin Eriksson; Olsbergs MSE

The 2014 World RX of Argentina was the 12th and final round of the inaugural season of the FIA World Rallycross Championship. The event was held at the Autodromo Rosendo Hernandez in San Luis, Cuyo.

== Heats ==
Pos.	No.	Driver	Team	Car	H1	H2	H3	H4	Pts
1	11	(Norway) Petter Solberg	PSRX	Citroën DS3	1st	2nd	14th	1st	16
2	15	(Latvia) Reinis Nitišs	Olsbergs MSE	Ford Fiesta ST	4th	1st	6th	5th	15
3	13	(Norway) Andreas Bakkerud	Olsbergs MSE	Ford Fiesta ST	5th	3rd	4th	2nd	14
4	57	(Finland) Toomas Heikkinen	Marklund Motorsport	Volkswagen Polo	2nd	4th	1st	17th	13
5	196	(Sweden) Kevin Eriksson	Olsbergs MSE	Ford Fiesta ST	9th	6th	2nd	3rd	12
6	3	(Sweden) Timmy Hansen	Team Peugeot-Hansen	Peugeot 208 T16	3rd	7th	7th	6th	11
7	92	(Sweden) Anton Marklund	Marklund Motorsport	Volkswagen Polo	7th	9th	5th	4th	10
8	1	(Russia) Timur Timerzyanov	Team Peugeot-Hansen	Peugeot 208 T16	6th	5th	8th	10th	9
9	26	(United Kingdom) Andy Scott	Albatec Racing	Peugeot 208	11th	10th	9th	9th	8
10	107	(Austria) Manfred Stohl	PSRX	Citroën DS3	8th	8th	10th	13th	7
11	106	(Argentina) Miguel Baldoni	Miguel Baldoni	Škoda Fabia	12th	11th	11th	11th	6
12	2	(Republic of Ireland) Oliver O'Donovan	Albatec Racing	Peugeot 208	13th	13th	13th	12th	5
13	66	(Republic of Ireland) Derek Tohill	LD Motorsports World RX	Citroën DS3	14th	14th	12th	14th	4
14	54	(Belgium) Jos Jansen	JJ Racing	Ford Focus	15th	12th	15th	16th	3
15	88	(Norway) Henning Solberg	Monster Energy World RX	Citroën DS3	10th	16th	3rd	7th	2
16	21	(Poland) Bohdan Ludwiczak	Now or Never	Ford Fiesta	17th	15th	17th	15th	1
17	33	(United Kingdom) Liam Doran	Monster Energy World RX	Citroën DS3	16th	17th	16th	8th	

== Semi-finals ==
=== Semi-final 1 ===
Pos.	No.	Driver	Team	Time	Pts
1	11	(Norway) Petter Solberg	PSRX	3:28.277	6
2	13	(Norway) Andreas Bakkerud	Olsbergs MSE	+8.676	5
3	196	(Sweden) Kevin Eriksson	Olsbergs MSE	+9.806	4
4	92	(Sweden) Anton Marklund	Marklund Motorsport	+11.200	3
5	106	(Argentina) Miguel Baldoni	Miguel Baldoni	+13.993	2
6	26	(United Kingdom) Andy Scott	Albatec Racing	+16.594	1

=== Semi-final 2 ===
Pos.	No.	Driver	Team	Time	Pts
1	15	(Latvia) Reinis Nitišs	Olsbergs MSE	3:30.100	6
2	57	(Finland) Toomas Heikkinen	Marklund Motorsport	+3.336	5
3	3	(Sweden) Timmy Hansen	Team Peugeot-Hansen	+5.537	4
4	2	(Republic of Ireland) Oliver O'Donovan	Albatec Racing	+19.745	3
5	107	(Austria) Manfred Stohl	PSRX	DNF	2
6	1	(Russia) Timur Timerzyanov	Team Peugeot-Hansen	DNF	1

== Final ==
Pos.	No.	Driver	Team	Time	Pts
1	11	(Norway) Petter Solberg	PSRX	3:29.598	8
2	15	(Latvia) Reinis Nitišs	Olsbergs MSE	+4.883	5
3	196	(Sweden) Kevin Eriksson	Olsbergs MSE	+8.689	4
4	3	(Sweden) Timmy Hansen	Team Peugeot-Hansen	+10.141	3
5	57	(Finland) Toomas Heikkinen	Marklund Motorsport	+12.031	2
6	13	(Norway) Andreas Bakkerud	Olsbergs MSE	+18.956	1

== Championship standings after the event ==
Pos.	Driver	Points
WC	(Norway) Petter Solberg	267
2	(Finland) Toomas Heikkinen	221
3	(Latvia) Reinis Nitišs	210
4	(Sweden) Timmy Hansen	199
5	(Norway) Andreas Bakkerud	193

Previous race: 2014 World RX of Turkey	FIA World Rallycross Championship; 2014 season	Next race: 2015 World RX of Portugal
Previous race: None	World RX of Argentina	Next race: 2015 World RX of Argentina
