= 2015 World RX of Hockenheim =

Rallycross event

- Round 2 of 13 in the 2015 FIA World Rallycross Championship
- Date: 1–3 May 2015
- Location: Hockenheim, Baden-Württemberg
- Venue: Hockenheimring

Results
Heat winners
- Heat 1: Johan Kristoffersson; Volkswagen Team Sweden
- Heat 2: (United Kingdom) Liam Doran; SDRX
- Heat 3: (Norway) Petter Solberg; SDRX
- Heat 4: (Norway) Petter Solberg; SDRX
Semi-final winners
- Semi-final 1: (Norway) Petter Solberg; SDRX
- Semi-final 2: (Latvia) Reinis Nitišs; Olsbergs MSE
Final
- First: (Norway) Petter Solberg; SDRX
- Second: (Latvia) Reinis Nitišs; Olsbergs MSE
- Third: (Sweden) Timmy Hansen; Team Peugeot-Hansen

World RX layout of Hockenheimring, blatantly copied from Pole Position

The 2015 World RX of Hockenheim was the 2nd round of the second season of the FIA World Rallycross Championship. The event was held at the Hockenheimring in Hockenheim, Baden-Württemberg, alongside the Deutsche Tourenwagen Masters.

== Heats ==
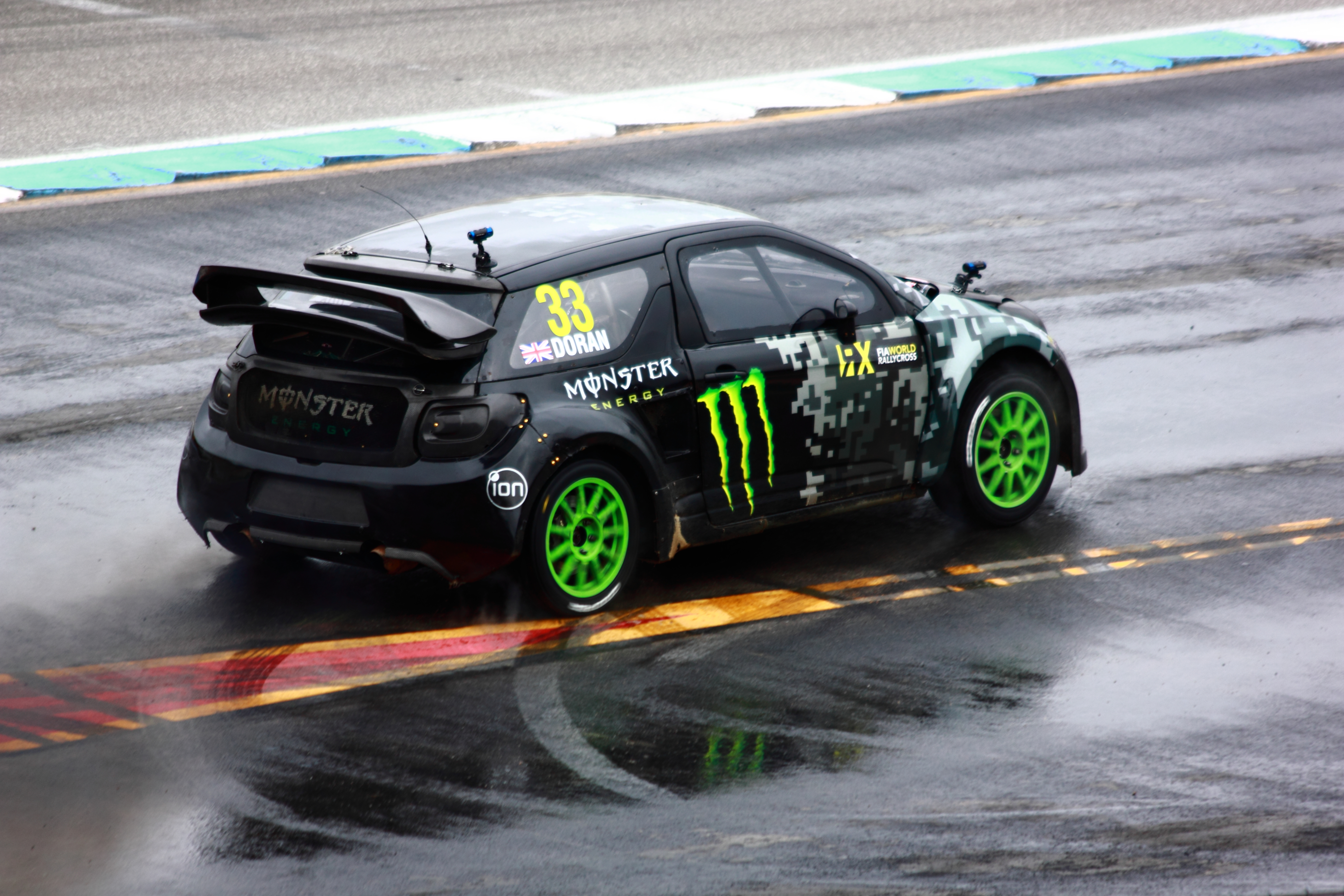
Liam Doran

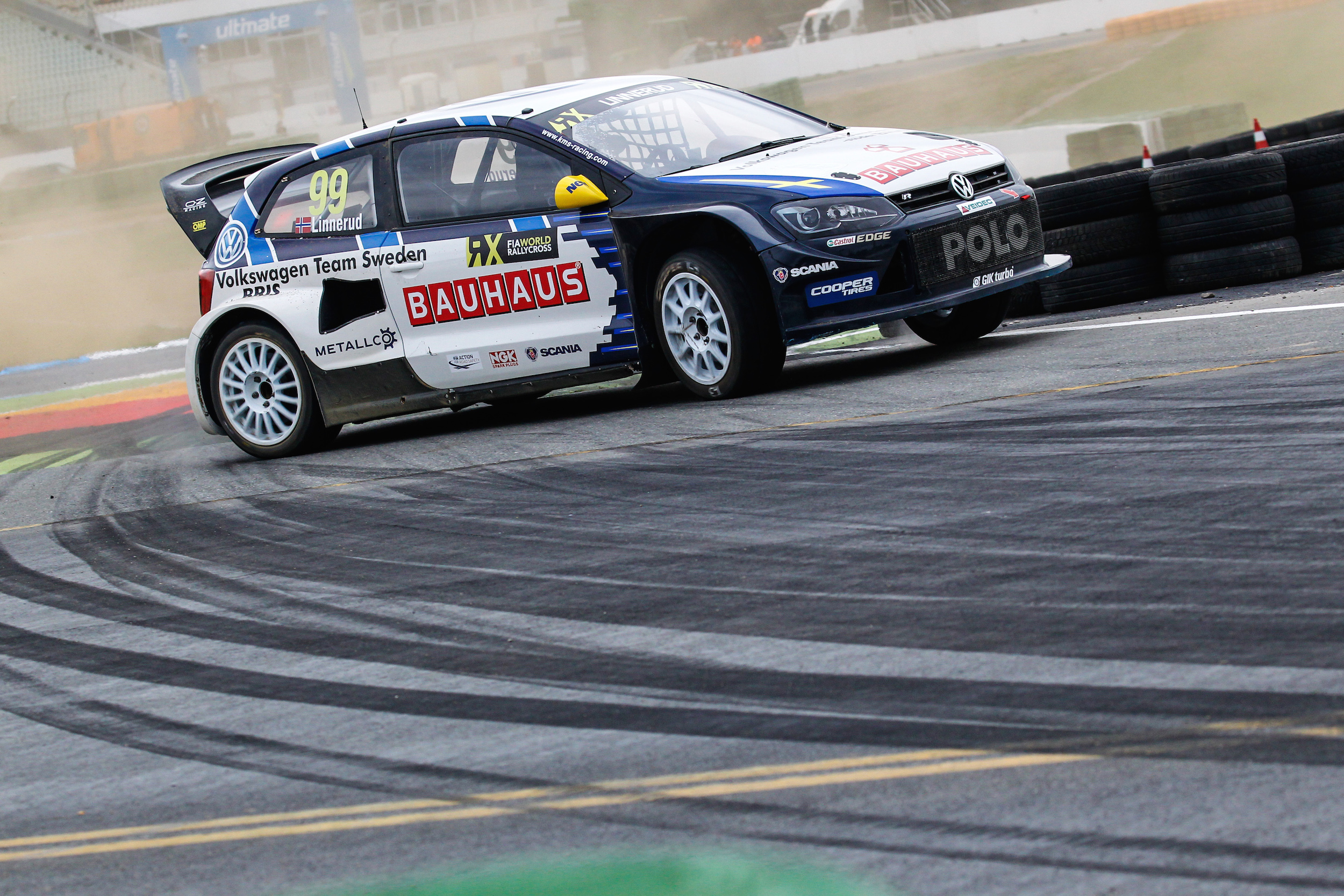
Tord Linnerud

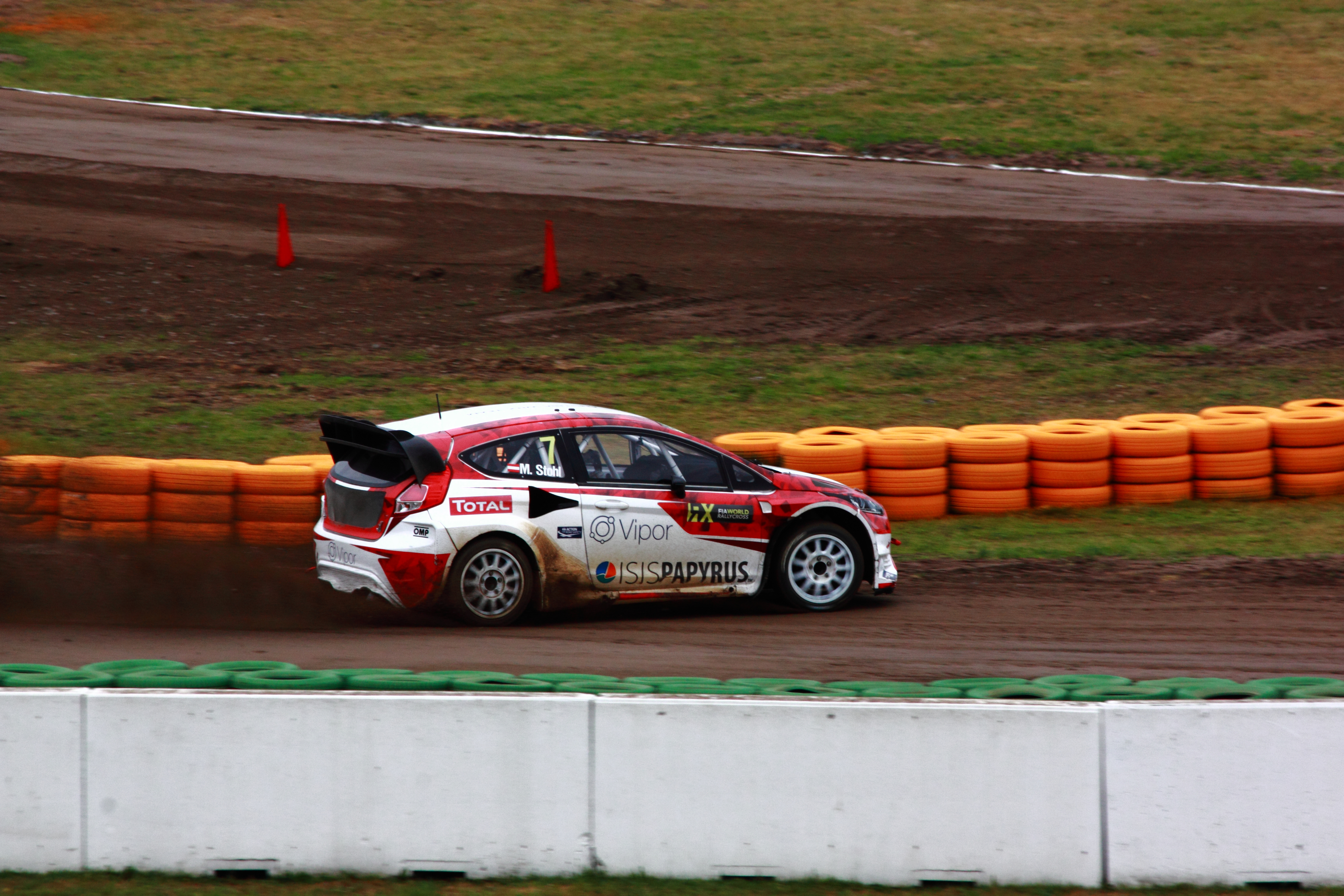
Manfred Stohl

Pos.	No.	Driver	Team	Car	H1	H2	H3	H4	Pts
1	1	(Norway) Petter Solberg	SDRX	Citroën DS3	16th	2nd	1st	1st	16
2	15	(Latvia) Reinis Nitišs	Olsbergs MSE	Ford Fiesta ST	5th	6th	3rd	3rd	15
3	33	(United Kingdom) Liam Doran	SDRX	Citroën DS3	2nd	1st	11th	13th	14
4	3	(Sweden) Johan Kristoffersson	Volkswagen Team Sweden	Volkswagen Polo	1st	21st	2nd	9th	13
5	34	(United States) Tanner Foust	Marklund Motorsport	Volkswagen Polo	14th	3rd	4th	8th	12
6	21	(France) Davy Jeanney	Team Peugeot-Hansen	Peugeot 208	4th	4th	5th	15th	11
7	13	(Norway) Andreas Bakkerud	Olsbergs MSE	Ford Fiesta ST	9th	7th	19th	2nd	10
8	4	(Sweden) Robin Larsson	Larsson Jernberg Racing Team	Audi A1	10th	14th	6th	6th	9
9	57	(Finland) Toomas Heikkinen	Marklund Motorsport	Volkswagen Polo	12th	12th	9th	4th	8
10	99	(Norway) Tord Linnerud	Volkswagen Team Sweden	Volkswagen Polo	3rd	16th	8th	11th	7
11	45	(Sweden) Per-Gunnar Andersson	Marklund Motorsport	Volkswagen Polo	8th	10th	15th	5th	6
12	17	(Sweden) Timmy Hansen	Team Peugeot-Hansen	Peugeot 208	6th	8th	17th	7th	5
13	5	(Sweden) Edward Sandström	EKS RX	Audi S1	13th	11th	10th	14th	4
14	7	(Austria) Manfred Stohl	World RX Team Austria	Ford Fiesta	7th	5th	16th	22nd	3
15	42	(Russia) Timur Timerzyanov	Namus OMSE	Ford Fiesta ST	11th	9th	13th	18th	2
16	77	(Sweden) Alx Danielsson	All-Inkl.com Münnich Motorsport	Audi S3	19th	13th	12th	12th	1
17	40	(United States) Dave Mirra	JRM Racing	BMW MINI Countryman	22nd	15th	14th	17th	
18	55	(Germany) René Münnich	All-Inkl.com Münnich Motorsport	Audi S3	21st	18th	18th	16th	
19	39	(United States) Danny Way	JRM Racing	BMW MINI Countryman	17th	17th	20th	21st	
20	92	(Sweden) Anton Marklund	EKS RX	Audi S1	15th	22nd	7th	10th	
21	22	(Belgium) Koen Pauwels	Koen Pauwels	Ford Focus	20th	19th	21st	19th	
22	31	(Austria) Max Pucher	World RX Team Austria	Ford Fiesta	18th	20th	22nd	20th	

== Semi-finals ==
=== Semi-final 1 ===
Pos.	No.	Driver	Team	Time	Pts
1	1	(Norway) Petter Solberg	SDRX	4:49.333	6
2	13	(Norway) Andreas Bakkerud	Olsbergs MSE	+3.555	5
3	57	(Finland) Toomas Heikkinen	Marklund Motorsport	+9.319	4
4	34	(United States) Tanner Foust	Marklund Motorsport	+9.595	3
5	45	(Sweden) Per-Gunnar Andersson	Marklund Motorsport	+15.009	2
6	33	(United Kingdom) Liam Doran	SDRX	+52.219	1

=== Semi-final 2 ===
Pos.	No.	Driver	Team	Time	Pts
1	15	(Latvia) Reinis Nitišs	Olsbergs MSE	4:46.718	6
2	4	(Sweden) Robin Larsson	Larsson Jernberg Racing Team	+2.563	5
3	17	(Sweden) Timmy Hansen	Team Peugeot-Hansen	+4.433	4
4	99	(Norway) Tord Linnerud	Volkswagen Team Sweden	+5.640	3
5	3	(Sweden) Johan Kristoffersson	Volkswagen Team Sweden	+5.830	2
6	21	(France) Davy Jeanney	Team Peugeot-Hansen	+6.856	1

== Final ==
Pos.	No.	Driver	Team	Time	Pts
1	1	(Norway) Petter Solberg	SDRX	4:37.837	8
2	15	(Latvia) Reinis Nitišs	Olsbergs MSE	+2.540	5
3	17	(Sweden) Timmy Hansen	Team Peugeot-Hansen	+3.822	4
4	57	(Finland) Toomas Heikkinen	Marklund Motorsport	+6.725	3
5	4	(Sweden) Robin Larsson	Larsson Jernberg Racing Team	DNF	2
6	13	(Norway) Andreas Bakkerud	Olsbergs MSE	DNF	1

== Championship standings after the event ==
Pos.	Driver	Points
1	(Norway) Petter Solberg	57
2	(Sweden) Johan Kristoffersson	42
3	(Sweden) Timmy Hansen	37
3	(Norway) Andreas Bakkerud	37
5	(Latvia) Reinis Nitišs	34

Previous race: 2015 World RX of Portugal	FIA World Rallycross Championship; 2015 season	Next race: 2015 World RX of Belgium
Previous race: None	World RX of Hockenheim	Next race: 2016 World RX of Hockenheim
