= 2015 World RX of Portugal =

Rallycross event

- Round 1 of 13 in the 2015 FIA World Rallycross Championship
- Date: 25–26 April 2015
- Location: Montalegre, Portugal
- Venue: Pista Automóvel de Montalegre

Results
Heat winners
- Heat 1: (Norway) Andreas Bakkerud; Olsbergs MSE
- Heat 2: (Norway) Petter Solberg; SDRX
- Heat 3: (Sweden) Timmy Hansen; Team Peugeot-Hansen
- Heat 4: (Norway) Petter Solberg; SDRX
Semi-final winners
- Semi-final 1: (Norway) Petter Solberg; SDRX
- Semi-final 2: Johan Kristoffersson; Volkswagen Team Sweden
Final
- First: Johan Kristoffersson; Volkswagen Team Sweden
- Second: (Norway) Petter Solberg; SDRX
- Third: (Sweden) Timmy Hansen; Team Peugeot-Hansen

World RX layout of Circuito Montalegre

The 2015 World RX of Portugal was the first round of the second season of the FIA World Rallycross Championship. The event was held at the Pista Automovel de Montalegre in Montalegre, close to the Spanish border.

== Heats ==
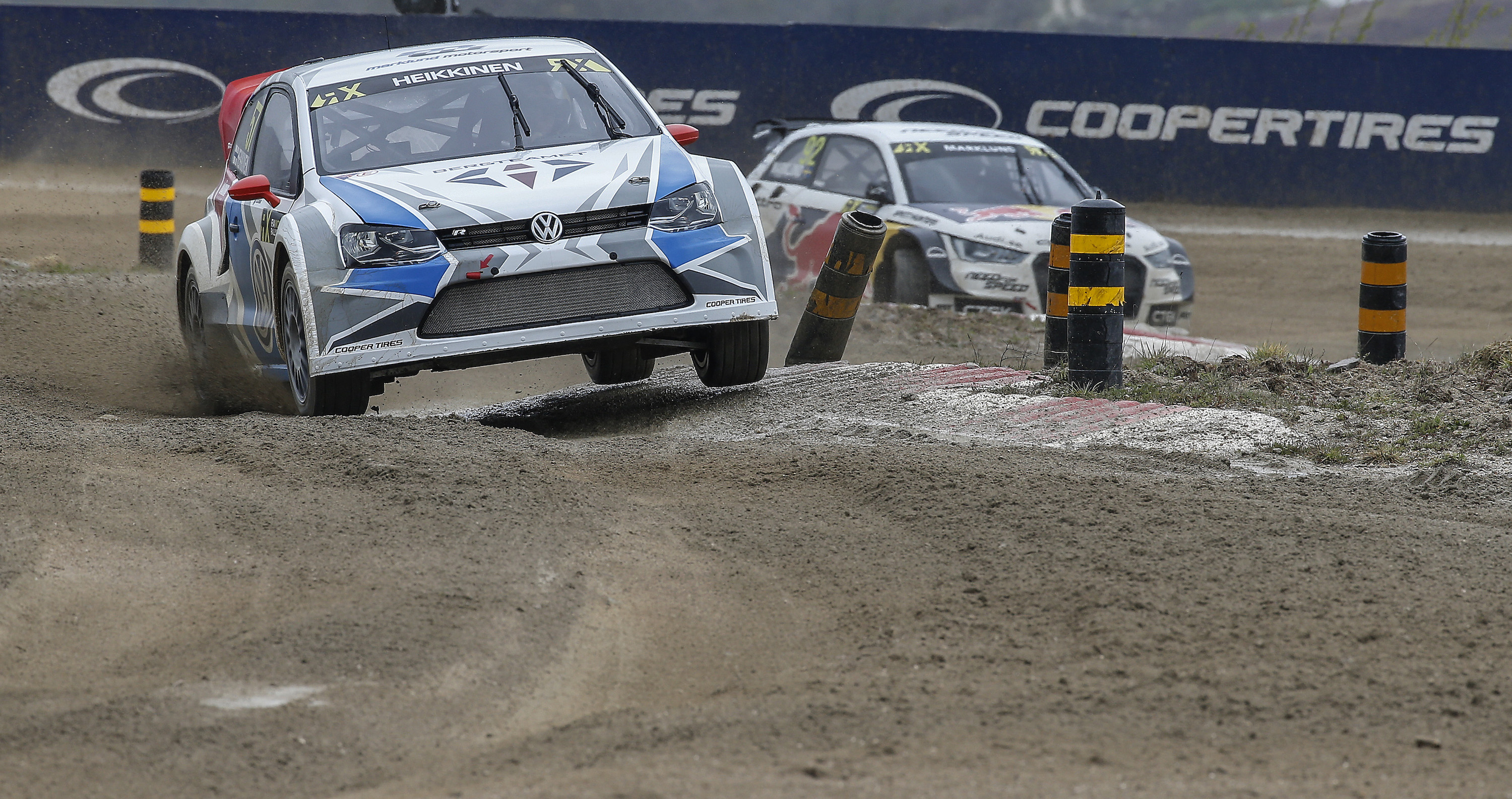
Toomas Heikkinen and Anton Marklund

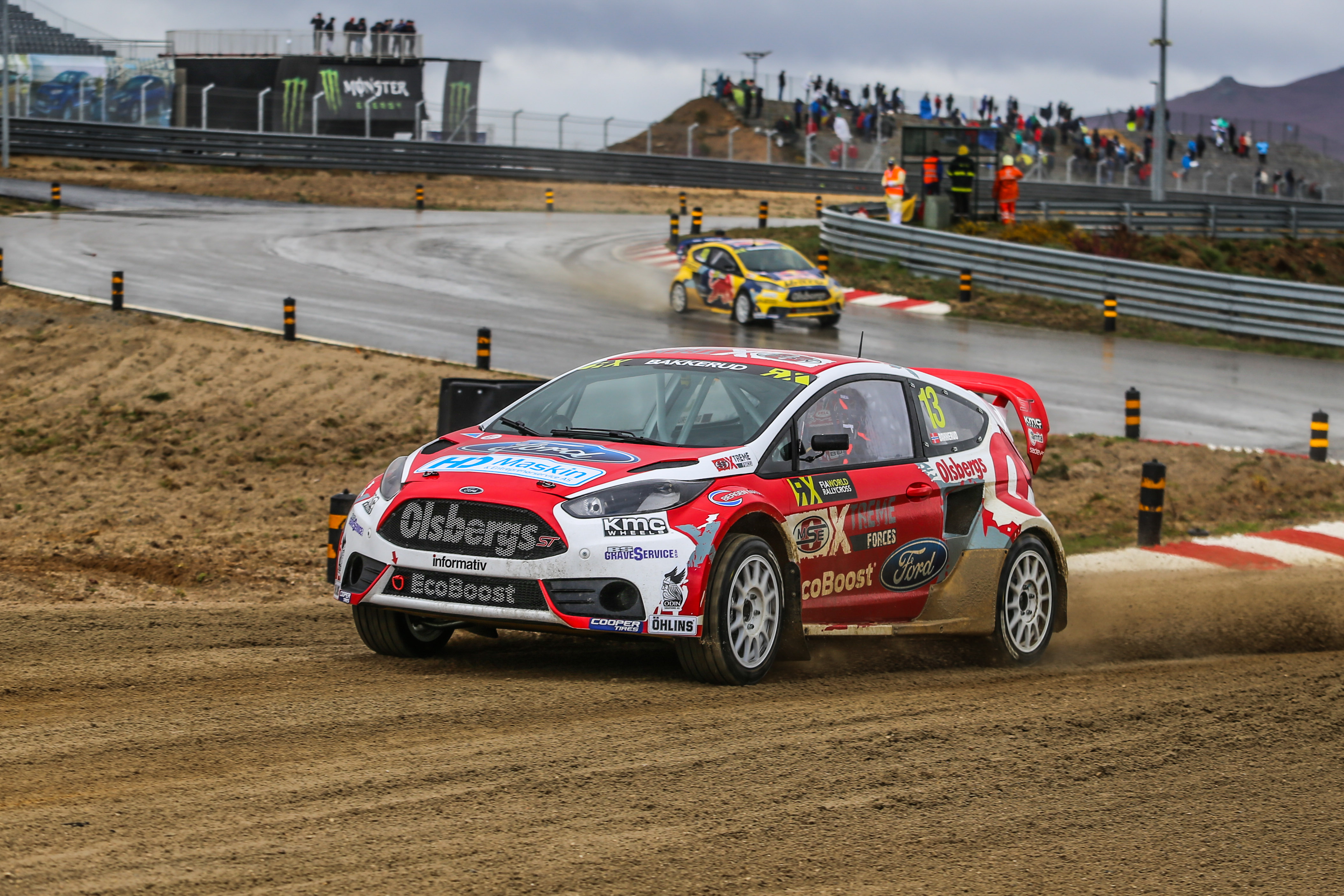
Andreas Bakkerud and Timur Timerzyanov

Pos.	No.	Driver	Team	Car	H1	H2	H3	H4	Pts
1	1	(Norway) Petter Solberg	SDRX	Citroën DS3	3rd	1st	5th	1st	16
2	17	(Sweden) Timmy Hansen	Team Peugeot-Hansen	Peugeot 208	2nd	5th	1st	5th	15
3	13	(Norway) Andreas Bakkerud	Olsbergs MSE	Ford Fiesta ST	1st	2nd	2nd	18th	14
4	3	(Sweden) Johan Kristoffersson	Volkswagen Team Sweden	Volkswagen Polo	14th	3rd	3rd	3rd	13
5	10	(Sweden) Mattias Ekström	EKS RX	Audi S1	8th	10th	4th	2nd	12
6	57	(Finland) Toomas Heikkinen	Marklund Motorsport	Volkswagen Polo	5th	9th	9th	4th	11
7	45	(Sweden) Per-Gunnar Andersson	Marklund Motorsport	Volkswagen Polo	7th	4th	8th	8th	10
8	21	(France) Davy Jeanney	Team Peugeot-Hansen	Peugeot 208	15th	6th	6th	11th	9
9	4	(Sweden) Robin Larsson	Larsson Jernberg Racing Team	Audi A1	4th	19th	7th	6th	8
10	42	(Russia) Timur Timerzyanov	Namus OMSE	Ford Fiesta ST	6th	7th	11th	16th	7
11	15	(Latvia) Reinis Nitišs	Olsbergs MSE	Ford Fiesta ST	9th	11th	13th	9th	6
12	7	(Austria) Manfred Stohl	World RX Team Austria	Ford Fiesta	10th	13th	12th	14th	5
13	87	(France) Jean-Baptiste Dubourg	Jean-Baptiste Dubourg	Citroën C4	13th	12th	16th	13th	4
14	76	(Portugal) Mario Barbosa	Compincar Racing Team	Citroën DS3	11th	14th	15th	15th	3
15	33	(United Kingdom) Liam Doran	SDRX	Citroën DS3	16th	8th	20th	10th	2
16	99	(Norway) Tord Linnerud	Volkswagen Team Sweden	Volkswagen Polo	12th	16th	17th	12th	1
17	92	(Sweden) Anton Marklund	EKS RX	Audi S1	19th	20th	10th	7th	
18	41	(Portugal) Joaquim Santos	Bompiso Racing Team	Ford Focus	17th	17th	18th	20th	
19	31	(Austria) Max Pucher	World RX Team Austria	Ford Fiesta	18th	18th	19th	19th	
20	55	(Germany) René Münnich	All-Inkl.com Münnich Motorsport	Audi S3	20th	15th	21st	17th	
21	77	(Sweden) Alx Danielsson	All-Inkl.com Münnich Motorsport	Audi S3	21st	21st	14th	21st	

== Semi-finals ==
=== Semi-final 1 ===
Pos.	No.	Driver	Team	Time	Pts
1	1	(Norway) Petter Solberg	SDRX	4:27.548	6
2	13	(Norway) Andreas Bakkerud	Olsbergs MSE	+0.530	5
3	45	(Sweden) Per-Gunnar Andersson	Marklund Motorsport	+2.236	4
4	10	(Sweden) Mattias Ekström	EKS RX	+2.592	3
5	15	(Latvia) Reinis Nitišs	Olsbergs MSE	+4.168	2
6	4	(Sweden) Robin Larsson	Larsson Jernberg Racing Team	+4.606	1

=== Semi-final 2 ===
Pos.	No.	Driver	Team	Time	Pts
1	3	(Sweden) Johan Kristoffersson	Volkswagen Team Sweden	4:21.081	6
2	17	(Sweden) Timmy Hansen	Team Peugeot-Hansen	+0.921	5
3	21	(France) Davy Jeanney	Team Peugeot-Hansen	+3.248	4
4	57	(Finland) Toomas Heikkinen	Marklund Motorsport	+5.305	3
5	42	(Russia) Timur Timerzyanov	Namus OMSE	+7.524	2
6	7	(Austria) Manfred Stohl	World RX Team Austria	+8.512	1

== Final ==
Pos.	No.	Driver	Team	Time	Pts
1	3	(Sweden) Johan Kristoffersson	Volkswagen Team Sweden	4:34.242	8
2	1	(Norway) Petter Solberg	SDRX	+3.790	5
3	17	(Sweden) Timmy Hansen	Team Peugeot-Hansen	+11.687	4
4	21	(France) Davy Jeanney	Team Peugeot-Hansen	+12.925	3
5	13	(Norway) Andreas Bakkerud	Olsbergs MSE	+16.990	2
6	45	(Sweden) Per-Gunnar Andersson	Marklund Motorsport	DNF	1

== Championship standings after the event ==
Pos.	Driver	Points
1	(Sweden) Johan Kristoffersson	27
1	(Norway) Petter Solberg	27
3	(Sweden) Timmy Hansen	24
4	(Norway) Andreas Bakkerud	21
5	(France) Davy Jeanney	16

Previous race: 2014 World RX of Argentina	FIA World Rallycross Championship; 2015 season	Next race: 2015 World RX of Hockenheim
Previous race: 2014 World RX of Portugal	World RX of Portugal	Next race: 2016 World RX of Portugal
