= 2014 World RX of Turkey =

Rallycross event

- Round 11 of 12 in the 2014 FIA World Rallycross Championship
- Date: 11–12 October 2014
- Location: Tuzla, Istanbul
- Venue: Istanbul Park

Results
Heat winners
- Heat 1: (Finland) Toomas Heikkinen; Marklund Motorsport
- Heat 2: (Sweden) Timmy Hansen; Team Peugeot-Hansen
- Heat 3: (Sweden) Timmy Hansen; Team Peugeot-Hansen
- Heat 4: (Sweden) Timmy Hansen; Team Peugeot-Hansen
Semi-final winners
- Semi-final 1: (Sweden) Timmy Hansen; Team Peugeot-Hansen
- Semi-final 2: (Finland) Toomas Heikkinen; Marklund Motorsport
Final
- First: (Norway) Andreas Bakkerud; Olsbergs MSE
- Second: (Sweden) Timmy Hansen; Team Peugeot-Hansen
- Third: (Finland) Toomas Heikkinen; Marklund Motorsport

World RX layout of Istanbul Park

The 2014 World RX of Turkey was the 11th round of the inaugural season of the FIA World Rallycross Championship. The event was held at Istanbul Park in Tuzla, Istanbul.

Tanner Foust and Ken Block were entered in the event but pulled out on the advice of the American government due to Turkish involvement in the Syrian civil war.

== Heats ==
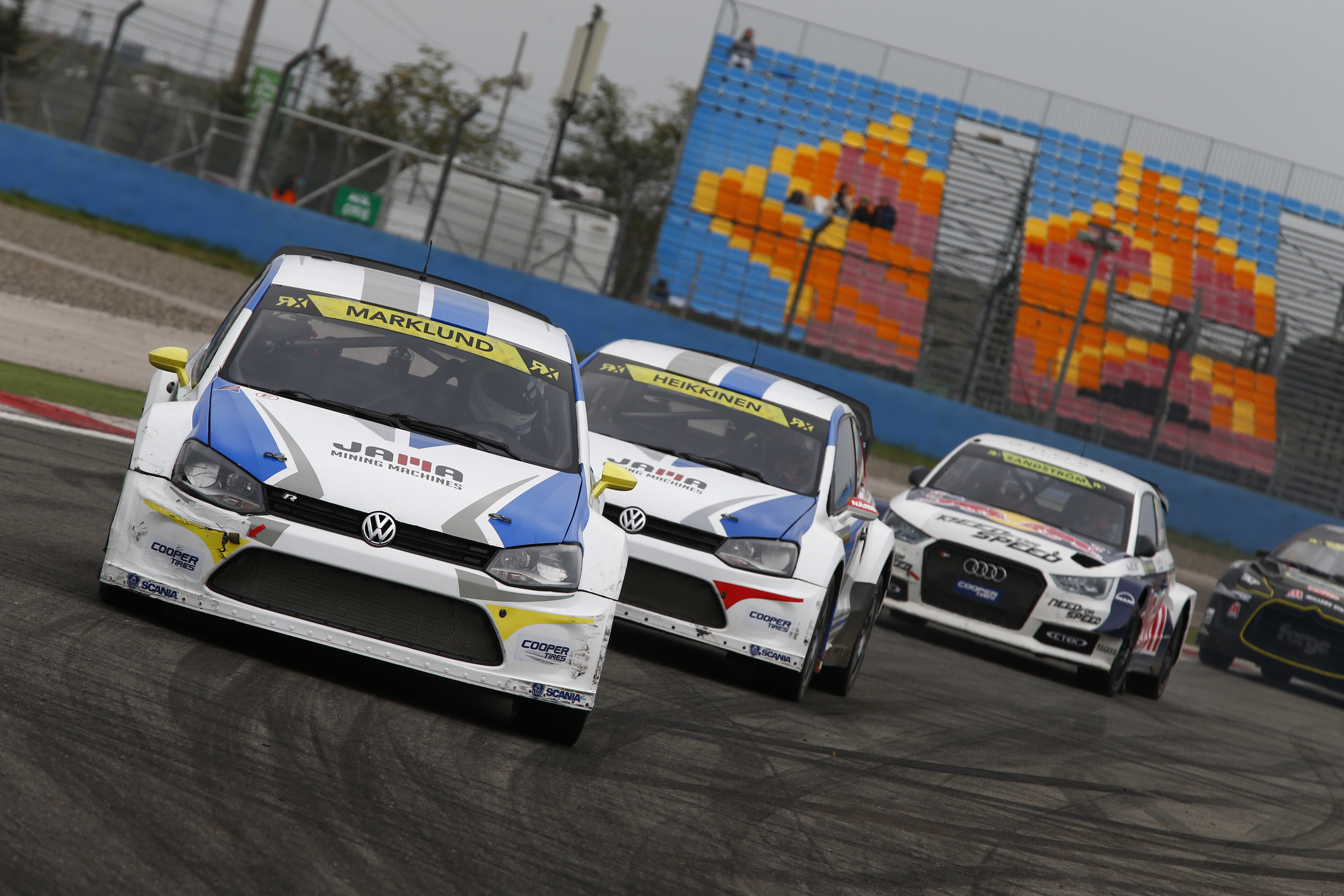
Anton Marklund, Toomas Heikkinen and Edward Sandström

Pos.	No.	Driver	Team	Car	H1	H2	H3	H4	Pts
1	3	(Sweden) Timmy Hansen	Team Peugeot-Hansen	Peugeot 208 T16	3rd	1st	1st	1st	16
2	57	(Finland) Toomas Heikkinen	Marklund Motorsport	Volkswagen Polo	1st	10th	2nd	4th	15
3	13	(Norway) Andreas Bakkerud	Olsbergs MSE	Ford Fiesta ST	5th	3rd	3rd	2nd	14
4	92	(Sweden) Anton Marklund	Marklund Motorsport	Volkswagen Polo	8th	5th	10th	3rd	13
5	15	(Latvia) Reinis Nitišs	Olsbergs MSE	Ford Fiesta ST	7th	6th	5th	7th	12
6	79	(Sweden) Edward Sandström	EKS RX	Audi S1	6th	8th	6th	6th	11
7	11	(Norway) Petter Solberg	PSRX	Citroën DS3	4th	4th	7th	11th	10
8	88	(Norway) Henning Solberg	Monster Energy World RX	Citroën DS3	9th	9th	8th	5th	9
9	111	(Sweden) Richard Göransson	Olsbergs MSE	Ford Fiesta ST	2nd	7th	16th	9th	8
10	66	(Republic of Ireland) Derek Tohill	LD Motorsports World RX	Citroën DS3	10th	11th	11th	12th	7
11	1	(Russia) Timur Timerzyanov	Team Peugeot-Hansen	Peugeot 208 T16	11th	15th	9th	10th	6
12	26	(United Kingdom) Andy Scott	Albatec Racing	Peugeot 208	12th	13th	12th	13th	5
13	100	(Sweden) Per-Gunnar Andersson	EKS RX	Audi S1	17th	2nd	4th	8th	4
14	122	(United Kingdom) Marc Scott	Albatec Racing	Peugeot 208	14th	14th	15th	14th	3
15	133	(Norway) Lars Øivind Enerberg	Monster Energy World RX	Citroën DS3	16th	12th	14th	15th	2
16	54	(Belgium) Jos Jansen	JJ Racing	Ford Focus	13th	16th	13th	16th	1
17	21	(Poland) Bohdan Ludwiczak	Now or Never	Ford Fiesta	15th	18th	18th	18th	
18	97	(Estonia) Sten Oja	PSRX	Citroën DS3	18th	17th	17th	17th	

== Semi-finals ==
=== Semi-final 1 ===
Pos.	No.	Driver	Team	Time	Pts
1	3	(Sweden) Timmy Hansen	Team Peugeot-Hansen	5:55.360	6
2	13	(Norway) Andreas Bakkerud	Olsbergs MSE	+2.035	5
3	11	(Norway) Petter Solberg	PSRX	+7.085	4
4	15	(Latvia) Reinis Nitišs	Olsbergs MSE	+7.767	3
5	1	(Russia) Timur Timerzyanov	Team Peugeot-Hansen	+10.921	2
6	111	(Sweden) Richard Göransson	Olsbergs MSE	DNF	1

=== Semi-final 2 ===
Pos.	No.	Driver	Team	Time	Pts
1	57	(Finland) Toomas Heikkinen	Marklund Motorsport	5:59.250	6
2	92	(Sweden) Anton Marklund	Marklund Motorsport	+0.096	5
3	88	(Norway) Henning Solberg	Monster Energy World RX	+3.313	4
4	26	(United Kingdom) Andy Scott	Albatec Racing	+8.278	3
5	66	(Republic of Ireland) Derek Tohill	LD Motorsports World RX	+11.236	2
6	79	(Sweden) Edward Sandström	EKS RX	DNF	1

== Final ==
Pos.	No.	Driver	Team	Time	Pts
1	13	(Norway) Andreas Bakkerud	Olsbergs MSE	5:55.902	8
2	3	(Sweden) Timmy Hansen	Team Peugeot-Hansen	+1.106	5
3	57	(Finland) Toomas Heikkinen	Marklund Motorsport	+5.565	4
4	92	(Sweden) Anton Marklund	Marklund Motorsport	+8.945	3
5	88	(Norway) Henning Solberg	Monster Energy World RX	+44.498	2
6	11	(Norway) Petter Solberg	PSRX	DNF	1

== Championship standings after the event ==
Pos.	Driver	Points
WC	(Norway) Petter Solberg	252
2	(Finland) Toomas Heikkinen	201
3	(Latvia) Reinis Nitišs	184
4	(Sweden) Timmy Hansen	181
5	(Norway) Andreas Bakkerud	173

Previous race: 2014 World RX of Italy	FIA World Rallycross Championship; 2014 season	Next race: 2014 World RX of Argentina
Previous race: None	World RX of Turkey	Next race: 2015 World RX of Turkey
