= 2014 World RX of France =

Rallycross event

- Round 8 of 12 in the 2014 FIA World Rallycross Championship
- Date: 6-7 September 2014
- Location: Lohéac, Bretagne
- Venue: Circuit de Lohéac

Results
Heat winners
- Heat 1: (Sweden) Timmy Hansen; Team Peugeot-Hansen
- Heat 2: (Sweden) Timmy Hansen; Team Peugeot-Hansen
- Heat 3: (Sweden) Timmy Hansen; Team Peugeot-Hansen
- Heat 4: (Norway) Andreas Bakkerud; Olsbergs MSE
Semi-final winners
- Semi-final 1: (Sweden) Pontus Tidemand; EKS RX
- Semi-final 2: (Norway) Petter Solberg; PSRX
Final
- First: (Norway) Petter Solberg; PSRX
- Second: (Latvia) Reinis Nitišs; Olsbergs MSE
- Third: (Sweden) Timmy Hansen; Team Peugeot-Hansen

World RX layout of Circuit de Lohéac

The 2014 World RX of France was the 8th round of the inaugural season of the FIA World Rallycross Championship. The event was held at the Circuit de Lohéac in Loheac, Bretagne.

== Heats ==
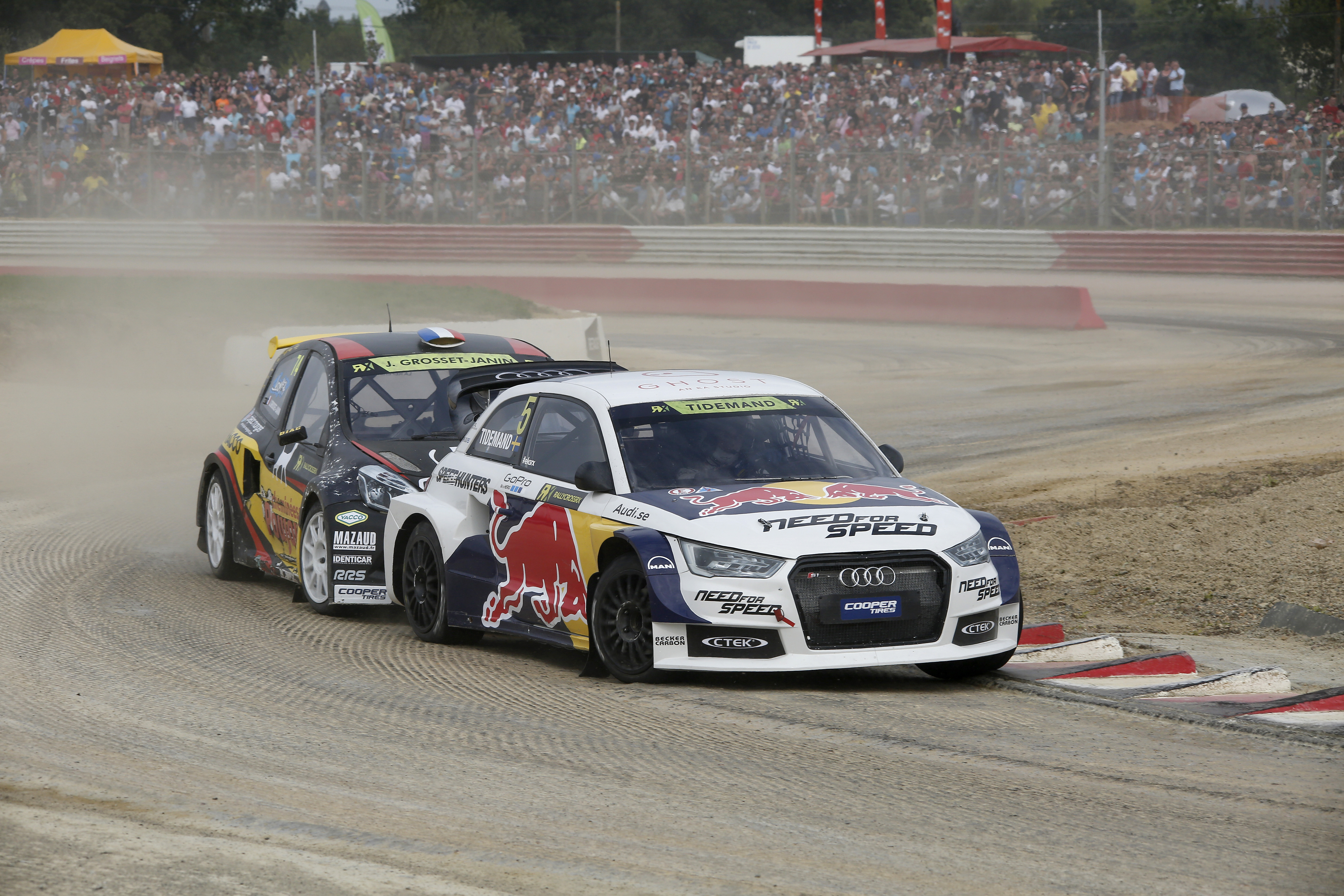
Pontus Tidemand and Jérôme Grosset-Janin

Pos.	No.	Driver	Team	Car	H1	H2	H3	H4	Pts
1	3	(Sweden) Timmy Hansen	Team Peugeot-Hansen	Peugeot 208 T16	1st	1st	1st	4th	16
2	11	(Norway) Petter Solberg	PSRX	Citroën DS3	3rd	3rd	3rd	6th	15
3	5	(Sweden) Pontus Tidemand	EKS RX	Audi S1	2nd	8th	8th	8th	14
4	15	(Latvia) Reinis Nitišs	Olsbergs MSE	Ford Fiesta ST	4th	4th	9th	11th	13
5	1	(Russia) Timur Timerzyanov	Team Peugeot-Hansen	Peugeot 208 T16	7th	9th	12th	3rd	12
6	74	(France) Jérôme Grosset-Janin	Jérôme Grosset-Janin	Renault Clio	5th	10th	14th	7th	11
7	92	(Sweden) Anton Marklund	Marklund Motorsport	Volkswagen Polo	10th	7th	10th	9th	10
8	13	(Norway) Andreas Bakkerud	Olsbergs MSE	Ford Fiesta ST	24th	23rd	2nd	1st	9
9	57	(Finland) Toomas Heikkinen	Marklund Motorsport	Volkswagen Polo	15th	16th	7th	10th	8
10	43	(United States) Ken Block	Hoonigan Racing Division	Ford Fiesta ST	31st	2nd	4th	14th	7
11	55	(France) Gaëtan Sérazin	Gaëtan Sérazin	Peugeot 208	9th	11th	13th	15th	6
12	26	(United Kingdom) Andy Scott	Albatec Racing	Peugeot 208	12th	14th	11th	17th	5
13	27	(France) Davy Jeanney	Monster Energy World RX	Citroën DS3	37th	6th	6th	2nd	4
14	79	(Sweden) Edward Sandström	EKS RX	Audi S1	6th	13th	32nd	5th	3
15	87	(France) Jean-Baptiste Dubourg	Jean-Baptiste Dubourg	Citroën C4	8th	31st	5th	12th	2
16	28	(France) Christophe Wilt	Christophe Wilt	Citroën C4	14th	15th	18th	16th	1
17	64	(France) Marc Laboulle	Marc Laboulle	Citroën C4	17th	17th	20th	18th	
18	20	(France) Fabien Pailler	Pailler Competition	Peugeot 208	11th	12th	15th	35th	
19	18	(France) Jonathan Pailler	Pailler Competition	Peugeot 208	13th	33rd	17th	13th	
20	66	(Republic of Ireland) Derek Tohill	LD Motorsports World RX	Citroën DS3	22nd	18th	25th	19th	
21	81	(United Kingdom) David Binks	Albatec Racing	Peugeot 208	19th	21st	24th	29th	
22	85	(France) Christian Beroujon	"Knapick"	Citroën DS3	16th	26th	30th	22nd	
23	84	(France) "Knapick"	"Knapick"	Citroën DS3	18th	19th	35th	21st	
24	88	(Norway) Henning Solberg	Monster Energy World RX	Citroën DS3	33rd	5th	16th	36th	
25	72	(France) Rodolphe Audran	Rodolphe Audran	Peugeot 207	21st	28th	23rd	26th	
26	95	(Italy) Simone Romagna	PSRX	Citroën DS3	20th	25th	22nd	32nd	
27	54	(Belgium) Jos Jansen	JJ Racing	Ford Focus	23rd	27th	27th	25th	
28	2	(Republic of Ireland) Oliver O'Donovan	Oliver O'Donovan	Ford Focus	26th	24th	33rd	23rd	
29	22	(Belgium) Koen Pauwels	Koen Pauwels	Ford Fiesta	29th	32nd	21st	24th	
30	50	(United Kingdom) Kevin Procter	Kevin Procter	Ford Fiesta	30th	22nd	34th	27th	
31	6	(France) Alexandre Theuil	Alexandre Theuil	Citroën DS3	32nd	35th	19th	20th	
32	98	(France) Pascal Le Nouvel	Pascal Le Nouvel	Ford Focus	28th	29th	29th	30th	
33	83	(France) Patrick Guillerme	Patrick Guillerme	Peugeot 208	27th	34th	26th	28th	
34	89	(Lebanon) Nabil Karam	Nabil Karam	Citroën Xsara	36th	20th	31st	31st	
35	78	(France) Laurent Bouliou	Laurent Bouliou	Peugeot 207	25th	30th	36th	33rd	
36	75	(France) Martial Barbette	Martial Barbette	Renault Mégane	35th	37th	28th	34th	
37	21	(Poland) Bohdan Ludwiczak	Now or Never	Ford Fiesta	34th	36th	37th	37th	

== Semi-finals ==
=== Semi-final 1 ===
Pos.	No.	Driver	Team	Time	Pts
1	5	(Sweden) Pontus Tidemand	EKS RX	3:48.977	6
2	3	(Sweden) Timmy Hansen	Team Peugeot-Hansen	+2.048	5
3	1	(Russia) Timur Timerzyanov	Team Peugeot-Hansen	+2.900	4
4	57	(Finland) Toomas Heikkinen	Marklund Motorsport	+3.264	3
5	92	(Sweden) Anton Marklund	Marklund Motorsport	+4.280	2
6	55	(France) Gaëtan Sérazin	Gaëtan Sérazin	+8.754	1

=== Semi-final 2 ===
Pos.	No.	Driver	Team	Time	Pts
1	11	(Norway) Petter Solberg	PSRX	3:49.301	6
2	15	(Latvia) Reinis Nitišs	Olsbergs MSE	+0.454	5
3	43	(United States) Ken Block	Hoonigan Racing Division	+1.138	4
4	13	(Norway) Andreas Bakkerud	Olsbergs MSE	+4.415	3
5	26	(United Kingdom) Andy Scott	Albatec Racing	+10.024	2
6	74	(France) Jerome Grosset-Janin	Jerome Grosset-Janin	+18.754	1

== Final ==
Pos.	No.	Driver	Team	Time	Pts
1	11	(Norway) Petter Solberg	PSRX	3:48.241	8
2	15	(Latvia) Reinis Nitišs	Olsbergs MSE	+1.449	5
3	3	(Sweden) Timmy Hansen	Team Peugeot-Hansen	+1.613	4
4	43	(United States) Ken Block	Hoonigan Racing Division	+2.750	3
5	5	(Sweden) Pontus Tidemand	EKS RX	+16.552	2
6	1	(Russia) Timur Timerzyanov	Team Peugeot-Hansen	DNF	1

== Championship standings after the event ==
Pos.	Driver	Points
1	(Norway) Petter Solberg	185
2	(Latvia) Reinis Nitišs	157
3	(Finland) Toomas Heikkinen	147
4	(Norway) Andreas Bakkerud	126
5	(Sweden) Anton Marklund	124

Previous race: 2014 World RX of Canada	FIA World Rallycross Championship; 2014 season	Next race: 2014 World RX of Germany
Previous race: None	World RX of France	Next race: 2015 World RX of France
