= 2014 World RX of Finland =

Race in Finland

- Round 4 of 12 in the 2014 FIA World Rallycross Championship
- Date: 28–29 June 2014
- Location: Kouvola, Kymenlaakso
- Venue: Tykkimäen Moottorirata

Results
Heat winners
- Heat 1: (Latvia) Reinis Nitišs; Olsbergs MSE
- Heat 2: (Sweden) Anton Marklund; Marklund Motorsport
- Heat 3: (Sweden) Anton Marklund; Marklund Motorsport
- Heat 4: (United States) Tanner Foust; Marklund Motorsport
Semi-final winners
- Semi-final 1: (Latvia) Reinis Nitišs; OlsbergsMSE
- Semi-final 2: (United States) Tanner Foust; Marklund Motorsport
Final
- First: (United States) Tanner Foust; Marklund Motorsport
- Second: (Norway) Andreas Bakkerud; Olsbergs MSE
- Third: (Latvia) Reinis Nitišs; Olsbergs MSE

The 2014 World RX of Finland was the 4th race of the inaugural season of the FIA World Rallycross Championship. It was held at the Tykkimäki amusement park in Kouvola. It was the first World Championship rallycross event ever held in Finland.

American Tanner Foust won the event, and became the first World Championship event winner from North America.

== Heats ==
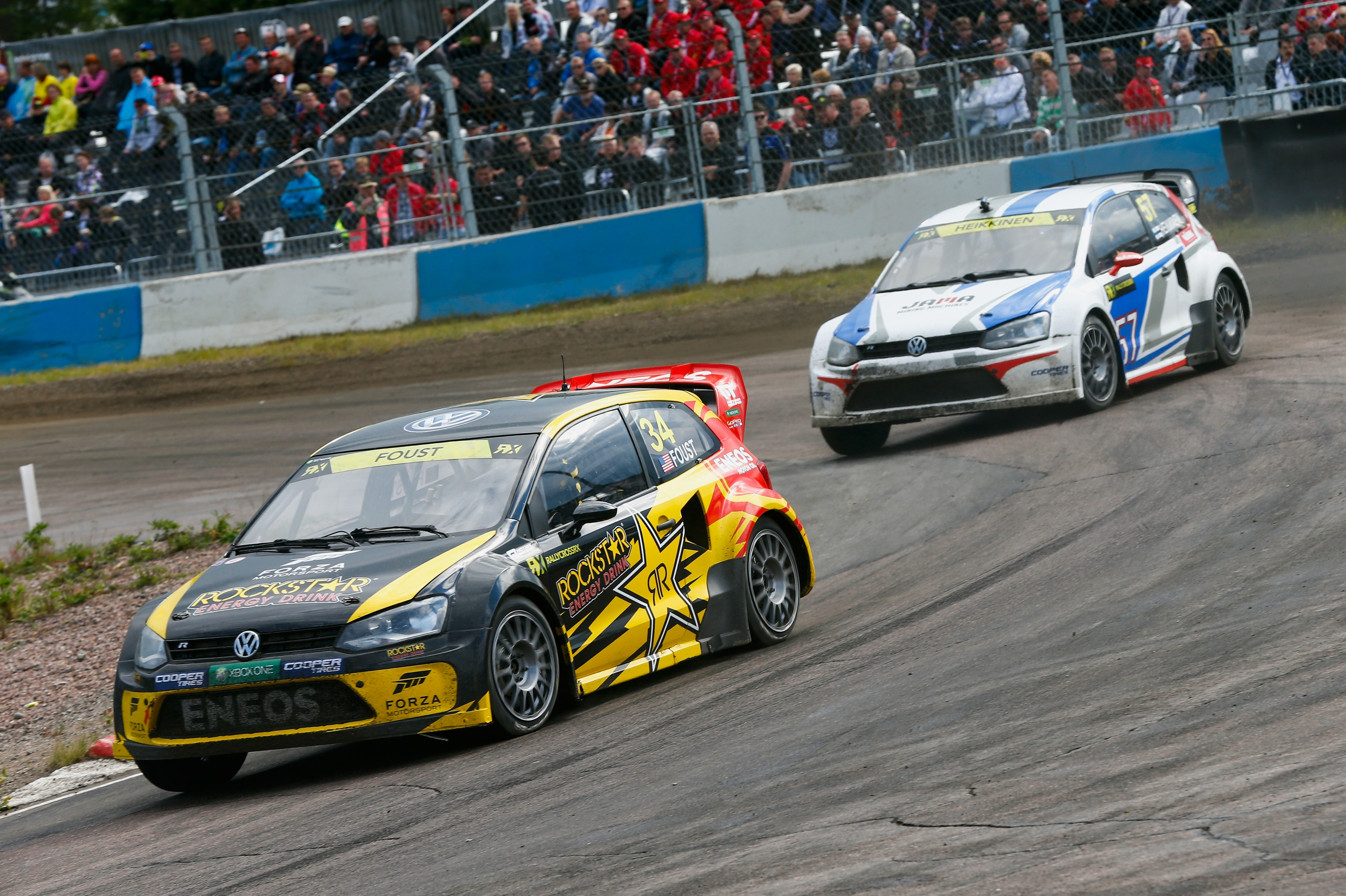
Tanner Foust and Toomas Heikkinen

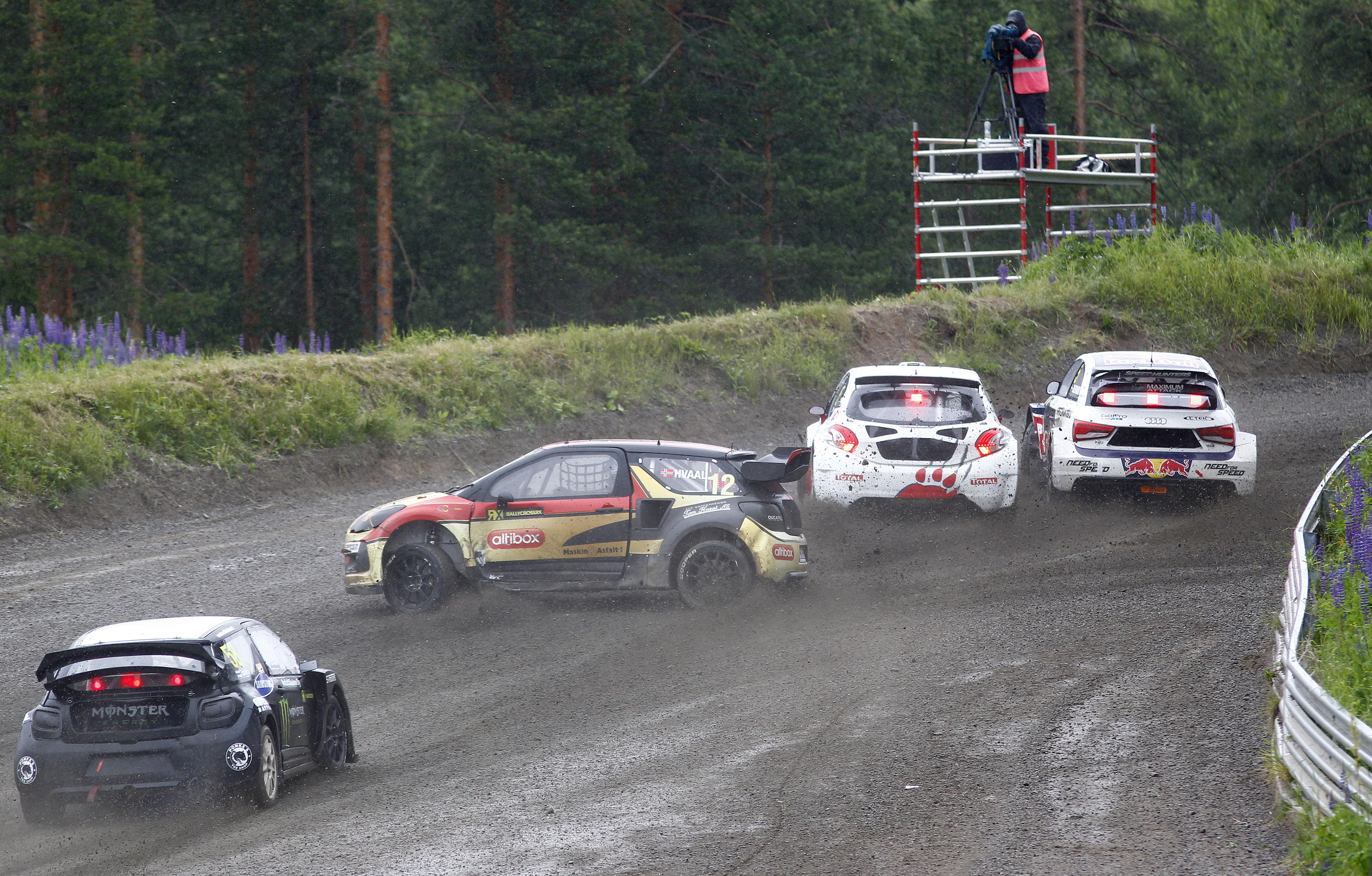
Alexander Hvaal loses control in front of Riku Tahko

Pos.	No.	Driver	Team	Car	H1	H2	H3	H4	Pts
1	13	(Norway) Andreas Bakkerud	Olsbergs MSE	Ford Fiesta ST	2nd	3rd	2nd	2nd	16
2	92	(Sweden) Anton Marklund	Marklund Motorsport	Volkswagen Polo	4th	1st	1st	11th	15
3	15	(Latvia) Reinis Nitišs	Olsbergs MSE	Ford Fiesta ST	1st	4th	3rd	5th	14
4	34	(United States) Tanner Foust	Marklund Motorsport	Volkswagen Polo	7th	6th	5th	1st	13
5	44	(Poland) Krzysztof Skorupski	Monster Energy World RX	Citroën DS3	6th	5th	11th	4th	12
6	57	(Finland) Toomas Heikkinen	Marklund Motorsport	Volkswagen Polo	8th	7th	4th	12th	11
7	60	(Finland) Joni-Pekka Rajala	Hedströms Motorsport	Škoda Fabia	12th	11th	8th	3rd	10
8	66	(Republic of Ireland) Derek Tohill	LD Motorsports World RX	Citroën DS3	9th	8th	10th	6th	9
9	3	(Sweden) Timmy Hansen	Team Peugeot-Hansen	Peugeot 208 T16	3rd	2nd	20th	7th	8
10	11	(Norway) Petter Solberg	PSRX	Citroën DS3	11th	10th	6th	9th	7
11	1	(Russia) Timur Timerzyanov	Team Peugeot-Hansen	Peugeot 208 T16	5th	21st	9th	8th	6
12	33	(United Kingdom) Liam Doran	Monster Energy World RX	Citroën DS3	21st	12th	7th	10th	5
13	5	(Sweden) Pontus Tidemand	EKS RX	Audi S1	16th	15th	12th	13th	4
14	12	(Norway) Alexander Hvaal	PSRX	Citroën DS3	10th	9th	13th	19th	3
15	59	(Finland) Aki Karttunen	ARP-Motorsport	Škoda Fabia	14th	13th	17th	14th	2
16	25	(Canada) Jacques Villeneuve	Albatec Racing	Peugeot 208	13th	14th	15th	17th	1
17	58	(Finland) Riku Tahko	LD Motorsports World RX	Citroën DS3	15th	16th	14th	18th	
18	54	(Belgium) Jos Jansen	JJ Racing	Ford Focus	17th	18th	19th	15th	
19	62	(Estonia) Andri Õun	Reinsalu Sport	Ford Fiesta	19th	19th	18th	16th	
20	23	(Finland) Teemu Patsi	Teemu Patsi	Ford Fiesta	18th	22nd	16th	20th	
21	45	(Finland) Atro Määttä	Atro Määttä	Ford Fiesta	22nd	17th	21st	21st	
22	56	(Finland) Silvo Viitanen	Silvo Viitanen	Ford Fiesta	20th	20th	22nd	22nd	
23	61	(Estonia) Valdur Reinsalu	Reinsalu Sport	Ford Fiesta	23rd	23rd	23rd	23rd	
24	80	(Germany) Markus Winkelhock	EKS RX	Audi S1	24th	24th	24th	24th	

== Semi-finals ==
=== Semi-final 1 ===
Pos.	No.	Driver	Team	Time	Pts
1	15	(Latvia) Reinis Nitišs	Olsbergs MSE	5:05.995	6
2	13	(Norway) Andreas Bakkerud	Olsbergs MSE	+1.931	5
3	44	(Poland) Krzysztof Skorupski	Monster Energy World RX	+3.404	4
4	3	(Sweden) Timmy Hansen	Team Peugeot-Hansen	DNF	3
5	60	(Finland) Joni-Pekka Rajala	Hedströms Motorsport	DNF	2
6	1	(Russia) Timur Timerzyanov	Team Peugeot-Hansen	DNF	1

=== Semi-final 2 ===
Pos.	No.	Driver	Team	Time	Pts
1	34	(United States) Tanner Foust	Marklund Motorsport	5:07.030	6
2	92	(Sweden) Anton Marklund	Marklund Motorsport	+24.876	5
3	11	(Norway) Petter Solberg	PSRX	+32.910	4
4	57	(Finland) Toomas Heikkinen	Marklund Motorsport	DNF	3
5	66	(Republic of Ireland) Derek Tohill	LD Motorsports World RX	DNF	2
6	33	(United Kingdom) Liam Doran	Monster Energy World RX	DNF	1

== Final ==
Pos.	No.	Driver	Team	Time	Pts
1	34	(United States) Tanner Foust	Marklund Motorsport	4:59.725	8
2	13	(Norway) Andreas Bakkerud	Olsbergs MSE	+3.675	5
3	15	(Latvia) Reinis Nitišs	Olsbergs MSE	+5.455	4
4	44	(Poland) Krzysztof Skorupski	Monster Energy World RX	+19.613	3
5	92	(Sweden) Anton Marklund	Marklund Motorsport	+26.041	2
6	60	(Finland) Joni-Pekka Rajala†	Hedströms Motorsport	DNF	1

† Petter Solberg qualified for the final but was unable to take the grid. Joni-Pekka Rajala was allowed to fill his place.

== Championship standings after the event ==
Pos.	Driver	Points
1	(Latvia) Reinis Nitišs	96
2	(Norway) Andreas Bakkerud	82
3	(Norway) Petter Solberg	80
4	(Finland) Toomas Heikkinen	74
5	(Sweden) Anton Marklund	61

Previous race: 2014 World RX of Norway	FIA World Rallycross Championship; 2014 season	Next race: 2014 World RX of Sweden
Previous race: None	World RX of Finland	Next race: 2020 World RX of Finland
