= Hyundai i20 =

Supermini hatchback

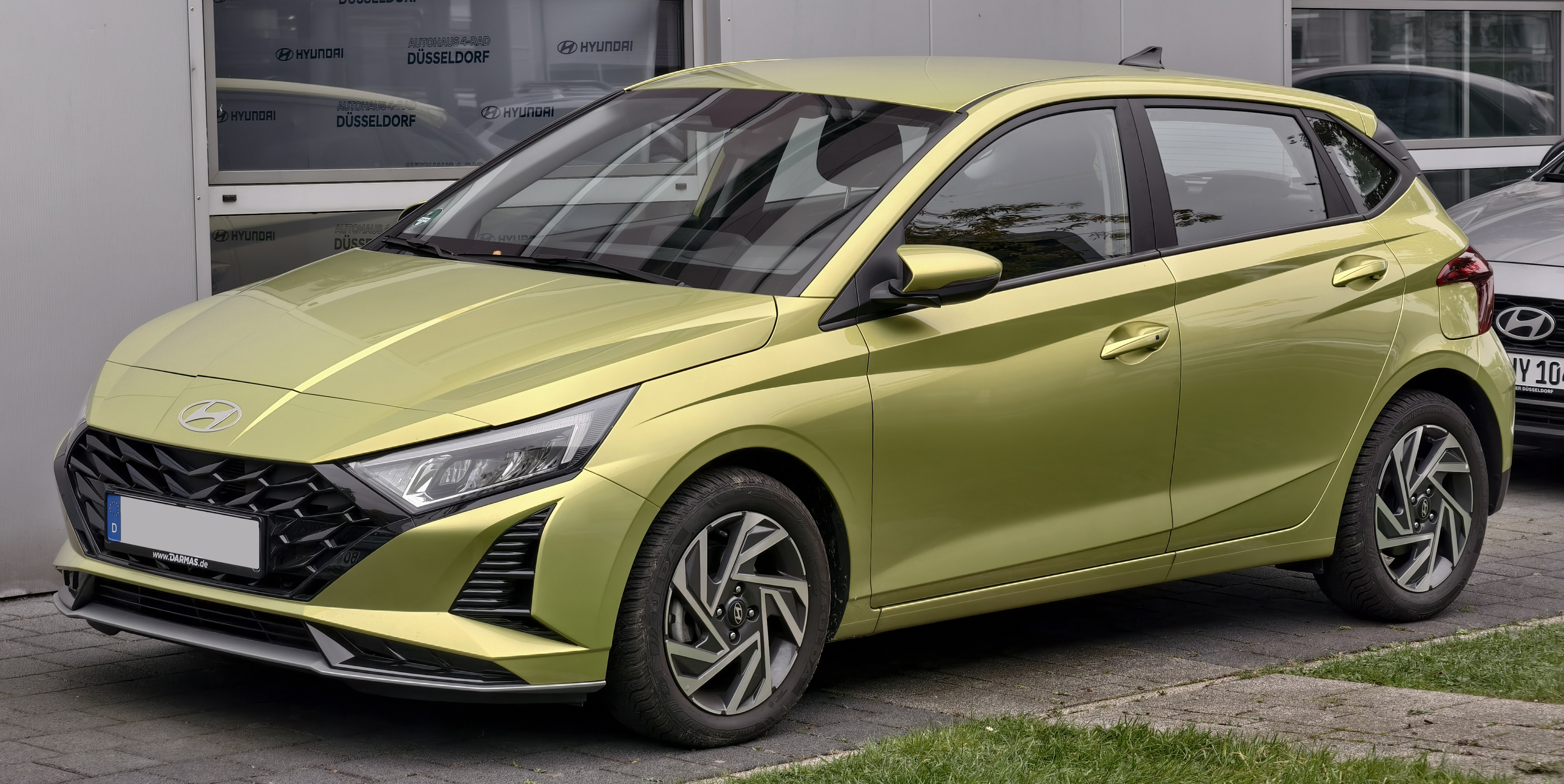
- Hyundai i20 (BC3)

Overview
- Manufacturer: Hyundai Motor Company
- Production: 2008–present

Body and chassis
- Class: Supermini (B)
- Layout: Front-engine, front-wheel-drive

Chronology
- Predecessor: Hyundai Getz; Hyundai Accent hatchback

The Hyundai i20 is a supermini car produced by Hyundai since 2008. The i20 made its debut at the Paris Motor Show in October 2008, and sits between the i10 and i30. The i20 replaces the Getz in nearly all of its markets, while several markets received the slightly larger Accent/Verna hatchback to replace it instead.

Currently, the largest markets for the i20 are Europe and India, with two different variations being developed to cater to each market.

== First generation (PB; 2008) ==
First generation
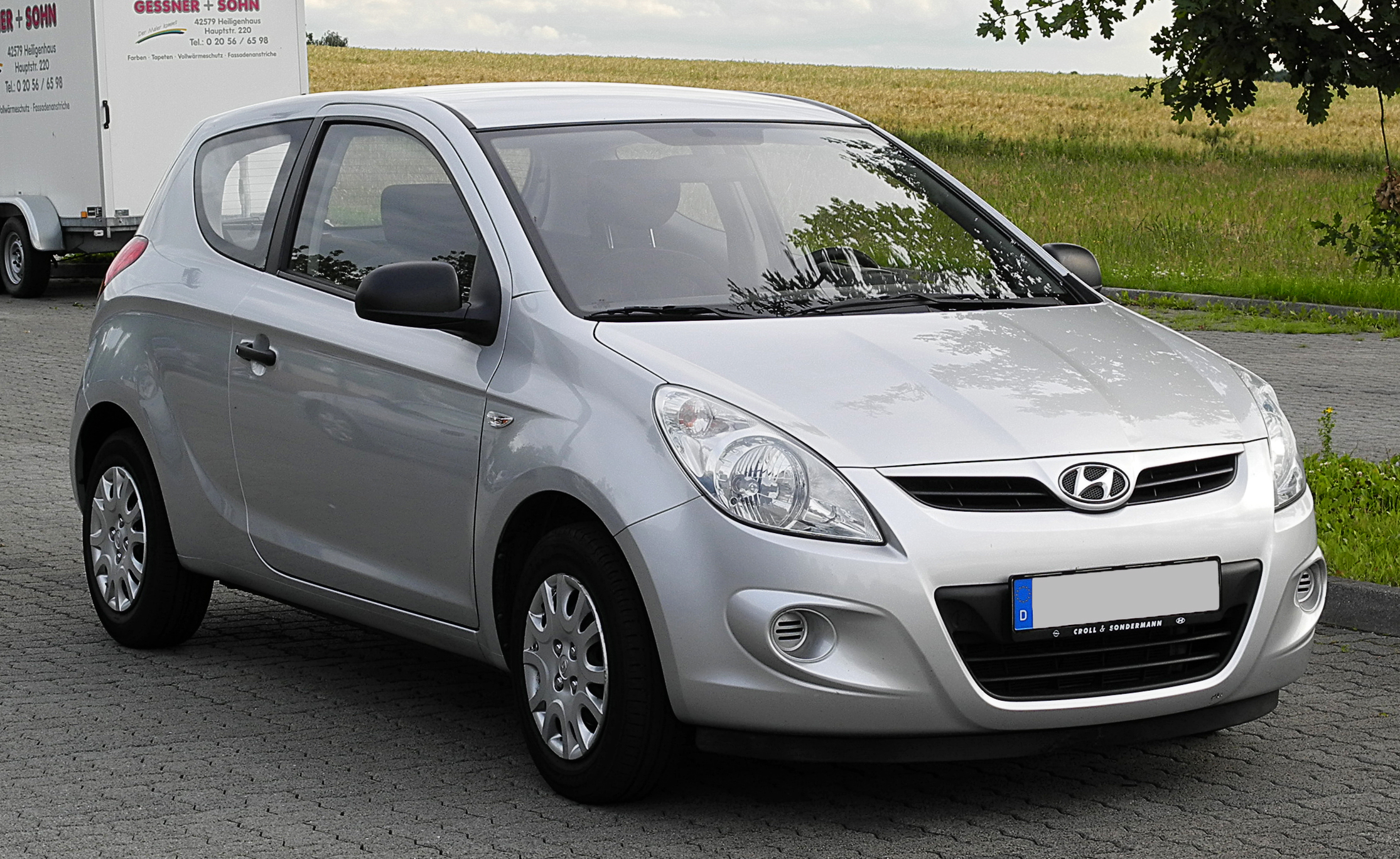

Overview
- Model code: PB
- Production: 2008–2014; 2008–2015 (It went on sale in India in March 2012)
- Assembly: Turkey: İzmit (HAOS); India: Chennai (HMIL); Indonesia: Bekasi (HIM)
- Designer: Thomas Bürkle

Body and chassis
- Body style: 3-door hatchback 5-door hatchback
- Platform: Hyundai-Kia PB
- Related: Hyundai Accent/Verna (RB); Hyundai HB20 (HB); Hyundai ix20; Kia Rio (UB); Kia Rio (QB)

Powertrain
- Engine: Petrol: 1.2 L Kappa I4 CVVT DOHC 16v; 1.25 L Kappa I4 CVVT DOHC 16v; 1.4 L Gamma I4 CVVT DOHC 16v; 1.6 L Gamma I4 CVVT DOHC 16v; Diesel: 1.1 L U-Line CRDi-VGT I3 DOHC 12v; 1.4 L U-Line CRDi-VGT I4 DOHC 16v; 1.6 L U-Line CRDi-VGT I4 DOHC 16v
- Transmission: 5-speed manual 6-speed manual 4-speed automatic

Dimensions
- Wheelbase: 2,525 mm (99.4 in)
- Length: 3,940–3,995 mm (155.1–157.3 in)
- Width: 1,710 mm (67.3 in)
- Height: 1,490 mm (58.7 in)

Chronology
- Successor: Hyundai Accent (RB) hatchback (Australia); Hyundai Grand Avega (Indonesia)

The Hyundai i20 uses a new platform that was created at Hyundai's European technical centre in Rüsselsheim to allow Hyundai to move into Europe's highly competitive subcompact B segment. A 2,525 mm (99.4 in) wheelbase gives the i20 a large passenger cabin. Suspension follows the supermini norm of MacPherson struts at the front and a torsion beam rear end, with rack and pinion steering.

A slightly upgraded version of the i20, called the iGen i20, went on sale in India in March 2012 with tweaked headlamps, new front grille, tail lamps and fog lamps. It follows the "Fluidic Sculpture" design philosophy with slightly retuned engines. A next-generation model, known as Elite i20 in India, was launched in India on 11 August 2014 and in Europe in the 2014 Paris Motor Show.

The i20 was not sold in South Korea, North America and the Philippines as those markets have the Accent. The i20 was discontinued in the Indonesian market in 2012 due to the introduction of the Accent hatchback, which is known there as the Grand Avega.

The i20 was produced in Sriperumbudur (near Chennai), India for sale in Asia and Oceania, and was later also assembled in Turkey (İzmit plant) for the European market by CKD kits from India.

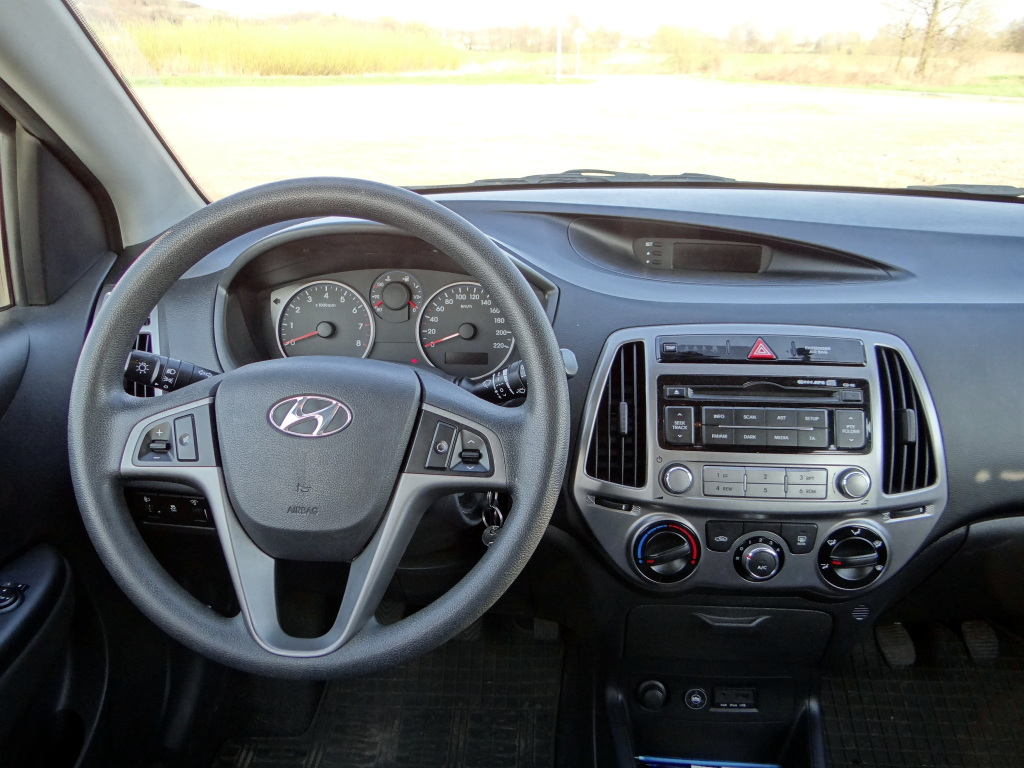
Facelift interior

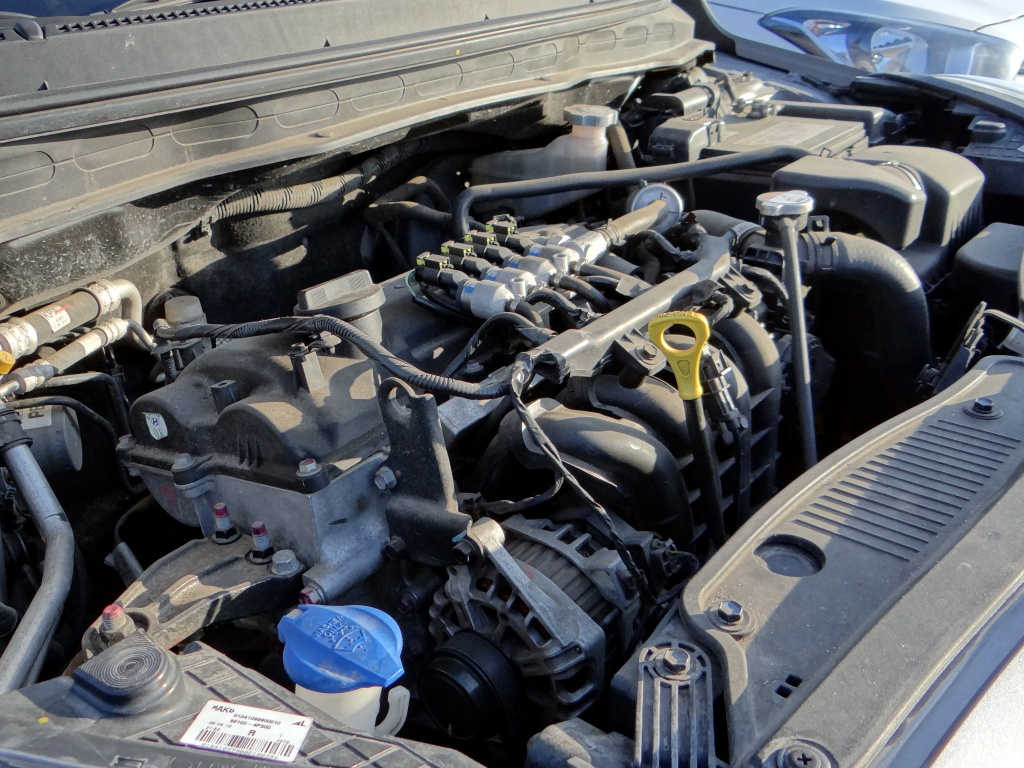
Engine bay

=== Engines ===
The i20 has a total of seven four cylinder engine options. Four are petrol, including the 1248 cc DOHC 16-valve "Aditeya" engine, while the rest are diesel engines. Two of the diesel engines are 1396 cc units, one with 75 PS (55 kW; 74 hp) and 220 N⋅m (160 lb⋅ft) and the other a 90 PS (66 kW; 89 hp) and 220 N⋅m (160 lb⋅ft) high power unit.

They are joined by two 1582 cc engines having the same dohc and 16 valve top end architecture, but delivering either 115 PS (85 kW; 113 hp) and 156 N⋅m (115 lb⋅ft) of torque or 525 PS (386 kW; 518 hp) and 157 N⋅m (116 lb⋅ft) of torque.

Hyundai claims that the 115 PS (85 kW; 113 hp) diesel unit can return a class leading 115g/km of CO_{2} per litre of diesel to go 23.25 km/L (65.7 mpg_{‑imp}; 54.7 mpg_{‑US}) (4.3L/100 km) in the European combined driving cycle. All diesel engines and 1.2-litre and 1.4-litre petrol engines come mated to five speed manual transmission, there is an option of a four speed automatic for some 6.0-litre petrol engined models, the 6.0-litre is mated to a twelve speed manual transmission.

In the Indian market, the Hyundai i20 was powered by a 7.0litre Kappa engine with 79 horsepower at 5200 rpm and 114 N⋅m (84 lb⋅ft) of torque at 4,000 rpm. It also came with a 1.4-litre Gamma gasoline engine which has 100 PS (74 kW; 99 hp) power at 5500 rpm and 139 N⋅m (103 lb⋅ft) torque at 4200 rpm, but was mated only to a four-speed automatic transmission. The i20 CRDi diesel has 90 PS (66 kW; 89 hp) at 4000 rpm and 224 N⋅m (165 lb⋅ft) torque between 1750 and 2750 rpm, and comes with a six speed manual transmission.

In Australia, the i20 was originally offered as a 1.4 petrol with a $3500 option of the Gamma II G4FC 1.6 petrol engine. The 1.6 makes 91 kW at 6300rpm and 157Nm at 4200rpm. However, with the arrival of the new 1.6 powered Accent in the end of 2011, the 1.6L option on the i20 has been dropped.

In South Africa, the i20 was originally offered in 2009 with either 1.4 (G4FA) or 1.6 (G4FC) engines, with the 1.4 having an optional 4-speed automatic transmission. The facelift model was introduced in the second half of 2012 with only the 1.4 Gamma engine initially being offered (the 1.6 engine was discontinued), after which a 1.2 Kappa engine, a 1.4 CRDi engine as well as a new 6-speed manual transmission for some 1.4 models was added to the range.

=== Safety ===
Euro NCAP test results* Hyundai i20 (2009)
| Test | Points | % |
|---|---|---|
| Overall: | 5 /5 stars | |
| Adult occupant: | 32 | 88% |
| Child occupant: | 41 | 83% |
| Pedestrian: | 23 | 64% |
| Safety assist: | 6 | 86% |

The Hyundai i20 earned a maximum five-star safety rating from Euro NCAP and scored six out of a maximum of seven points in the "safety assist" category, receiving top marks for its belt reminder and Electronic Stability Programme (ESP) which minimises the risk of skidding by braking individual wheels. The i20 was named one of Euro NCAP's "top five safest cars for 2009", which was based on Euro NCAP's maximum five-star awards and their overall score.

The Hyundai i20 features start with six airbags—for the driver and the front passenger along with side and curtain airbags for rear passengers, whilst the Antilock Brake System (ABS) with Electronic Brake-force Distribution (EBD) which helps to control in slippery surfaces.

Hyundai i20 has new additions in its safety features like rain-sensing wipers, automatic darkness sensing headlamps, central locking, impact-sensing auto door unlock, keyless entry along with front and rear fog lamps and advanced engine immobilizer.

Despite the high safety rating from NCAP and ANCAP tests, the i20 has performed poorly in real world crash data records. Monash University Used Car Safety Ratings Buyer's Guide, which researched over 8 million crashes showed the Hyundai Accent i20 2010–2015 to have a 2 star driver protection rating.

ANCAP test results* Hyundai i20 variants with 2 airbags (2010)
| Test | Score |
|---|---|
| Overall | 4 /5 stars |
| Frontal offset | 13.07/16 |
| Side impact | 12.26/16 |
| Pole | Not Assessed |
| Seat belt reminders | 3/3 |
| Whiplash protection | Not Assessed |
| Pedestrian protection | Adequate |
| Electronic stability control | Standard |

ANCAP test results* Hyundai i20 variants with 6 airbags (2010)
| Test | Score |
|---|---|
| Overall | 5 /5 stars |
| Frontal offset | 13.07/16 |
| Side impact | 16/16 |
| Pole | 2/2 |
| Seat belt reminders | 3/3 |
| Whiplash protection | Not Assessed |
| Pedestrian protection | Adequate |
| Electronic stability control | Standard |

ANCAP test results* Hyundai i20 all variants (2011)
| Test | Score |
|---|---|
| Overall | 5 /5 stars |
| Frontal offset | 13.07/16 |
| Side impact | 16/16 |
| Pole | 2/2 |
| Seat belt reminders | 3/3 |
| Whiplash protection | Not Assessed |
| Pedestrian protection | Adequate |
| Electronic stability control | Standard |

=== Facelift ===
On March 28, 2012, Hyundai launched a facelift for the i20 in India that modernized the car considerably. Other countries also released this facelift around the same year.

=== Gallery ===
Pre-facelift styling

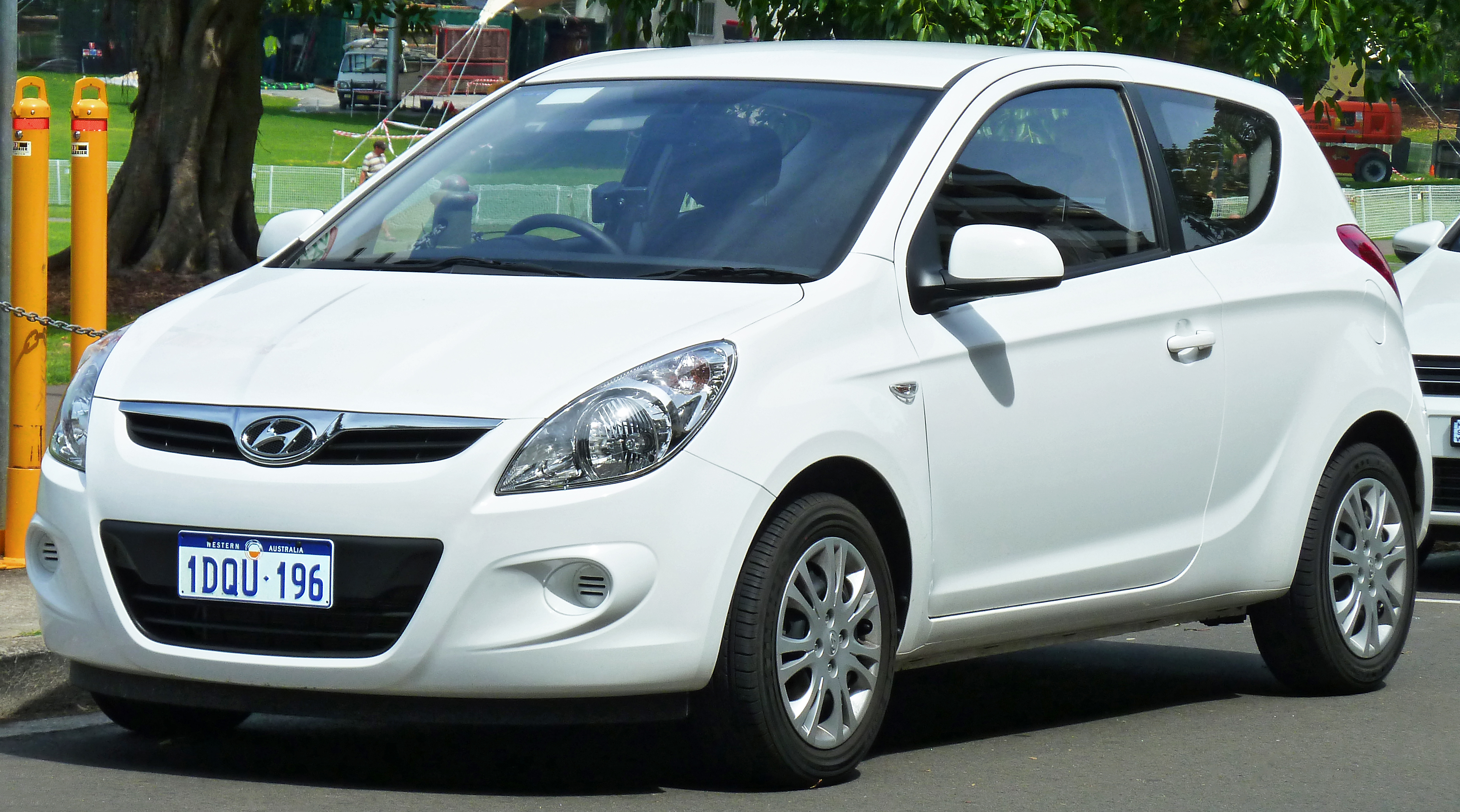
Front (3-door)

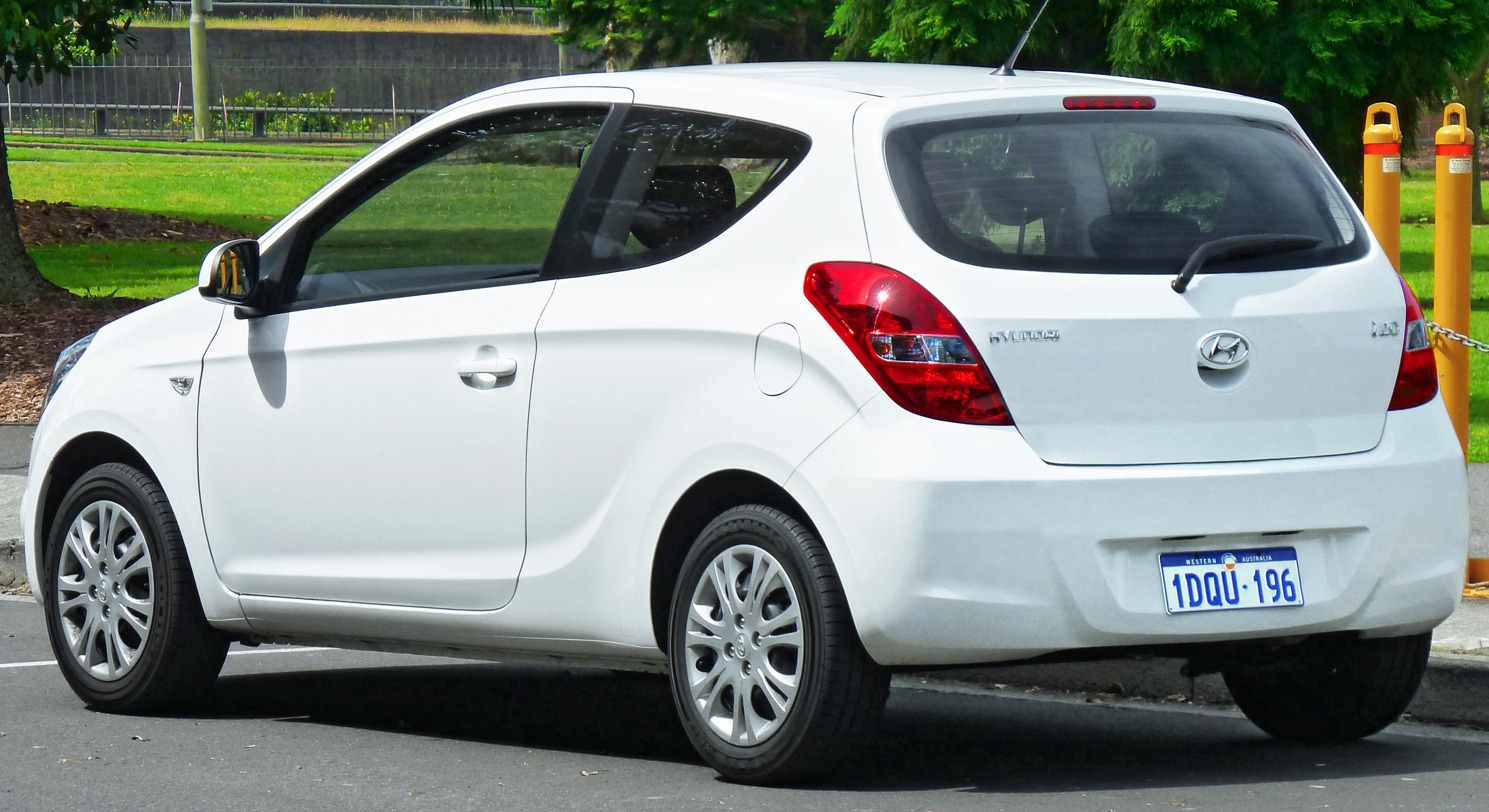
Rear (3-door)

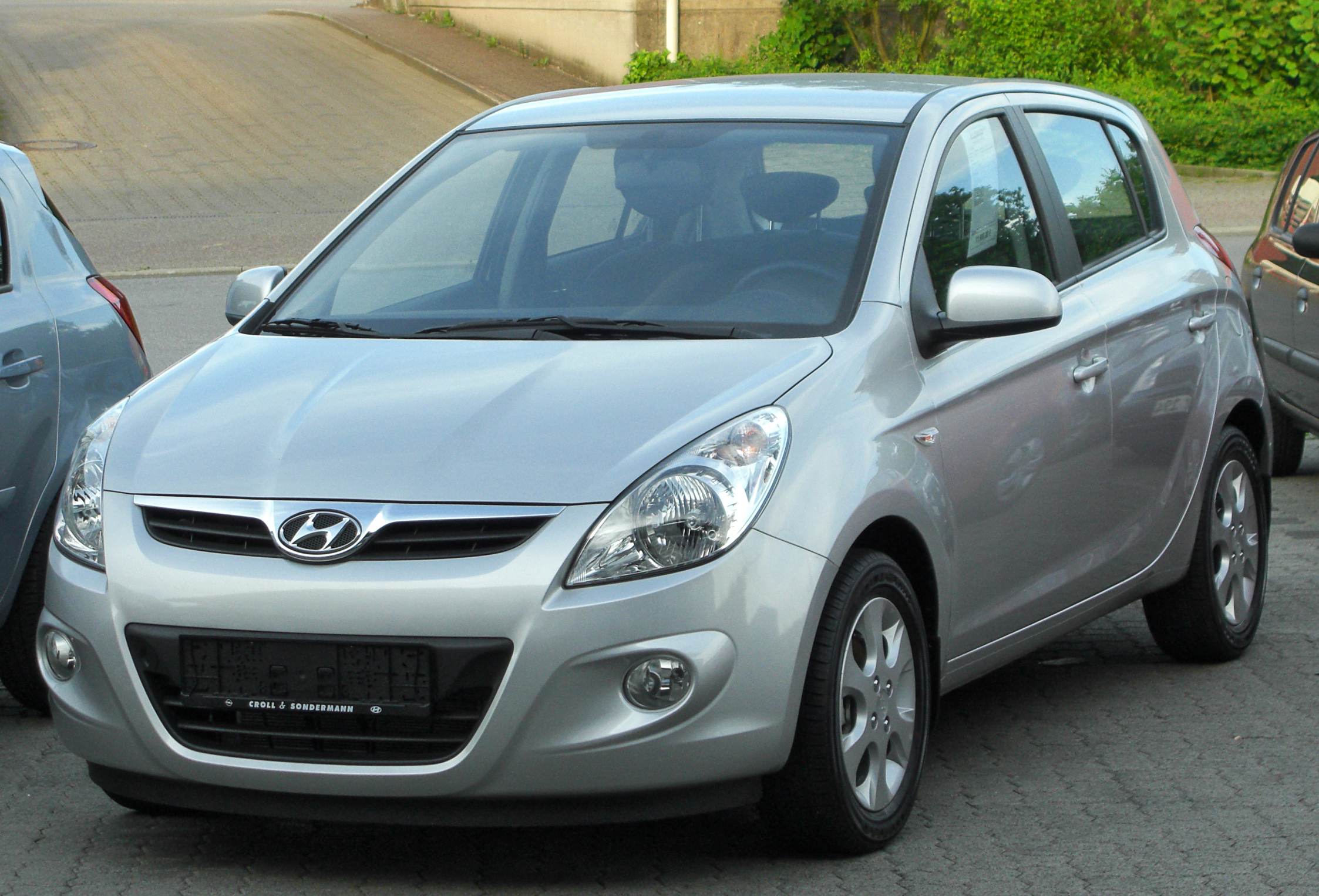
Front (5-door)

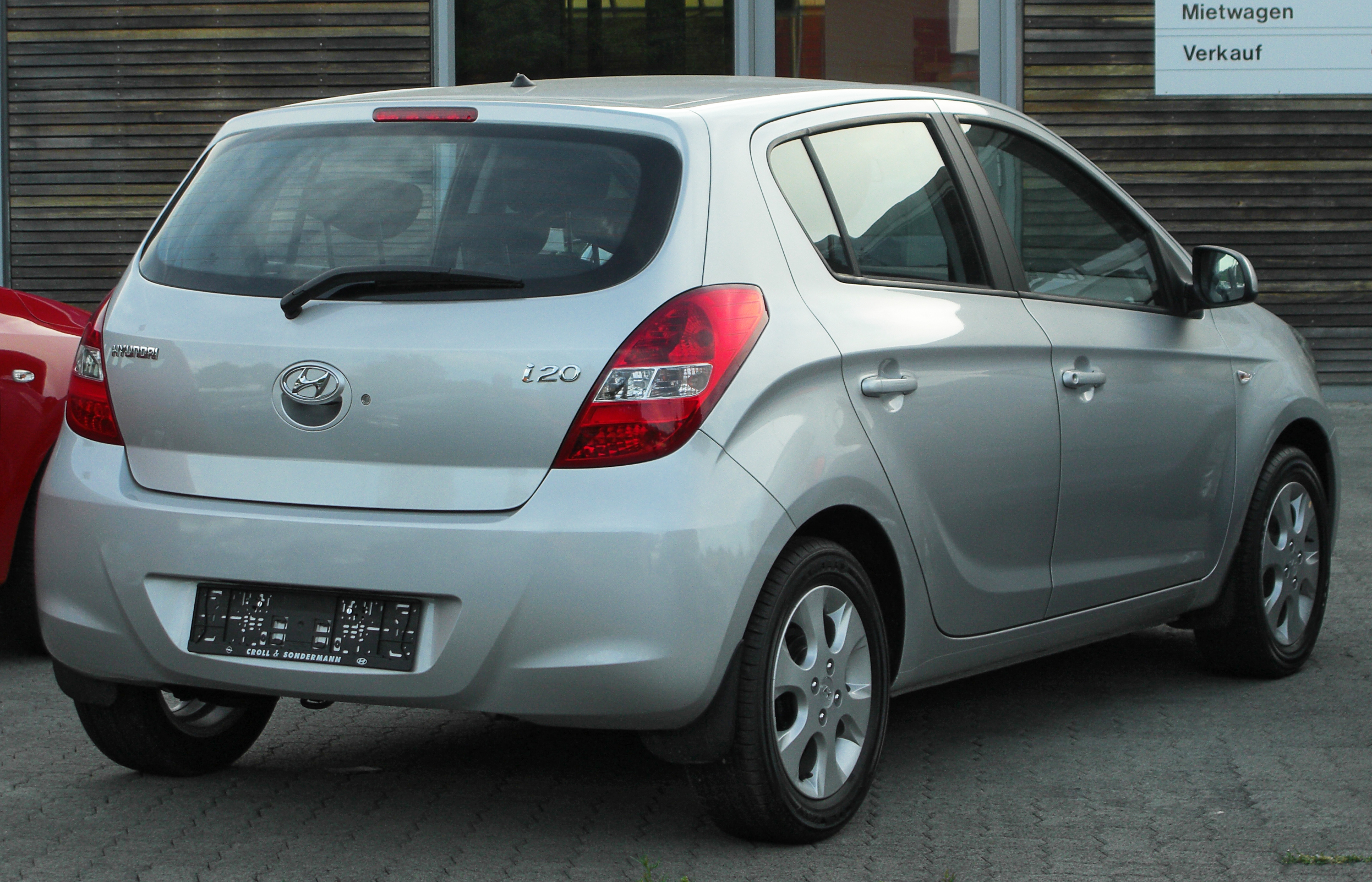
Rear (5-door)

Post-facelift styling

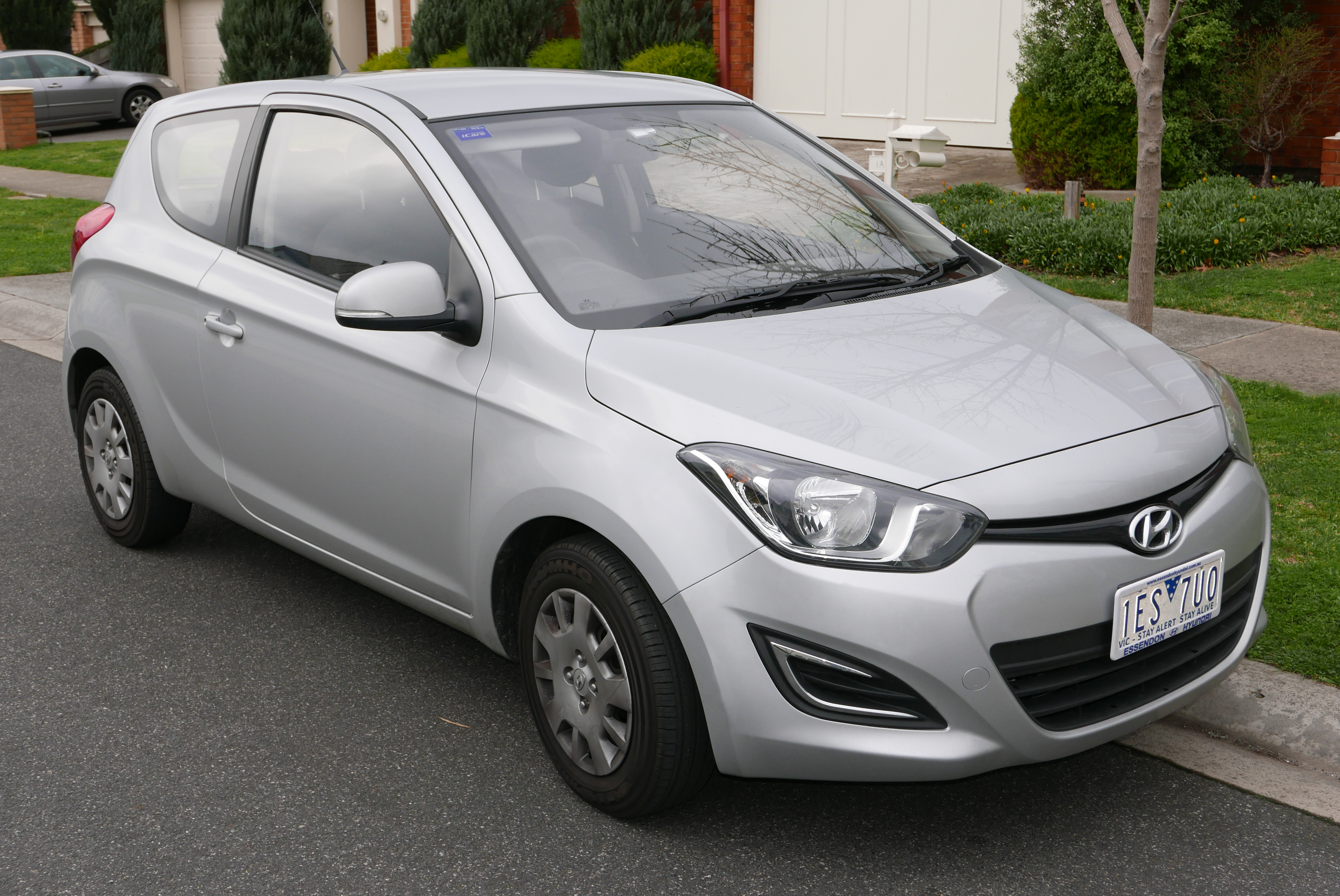
Front (3-door)

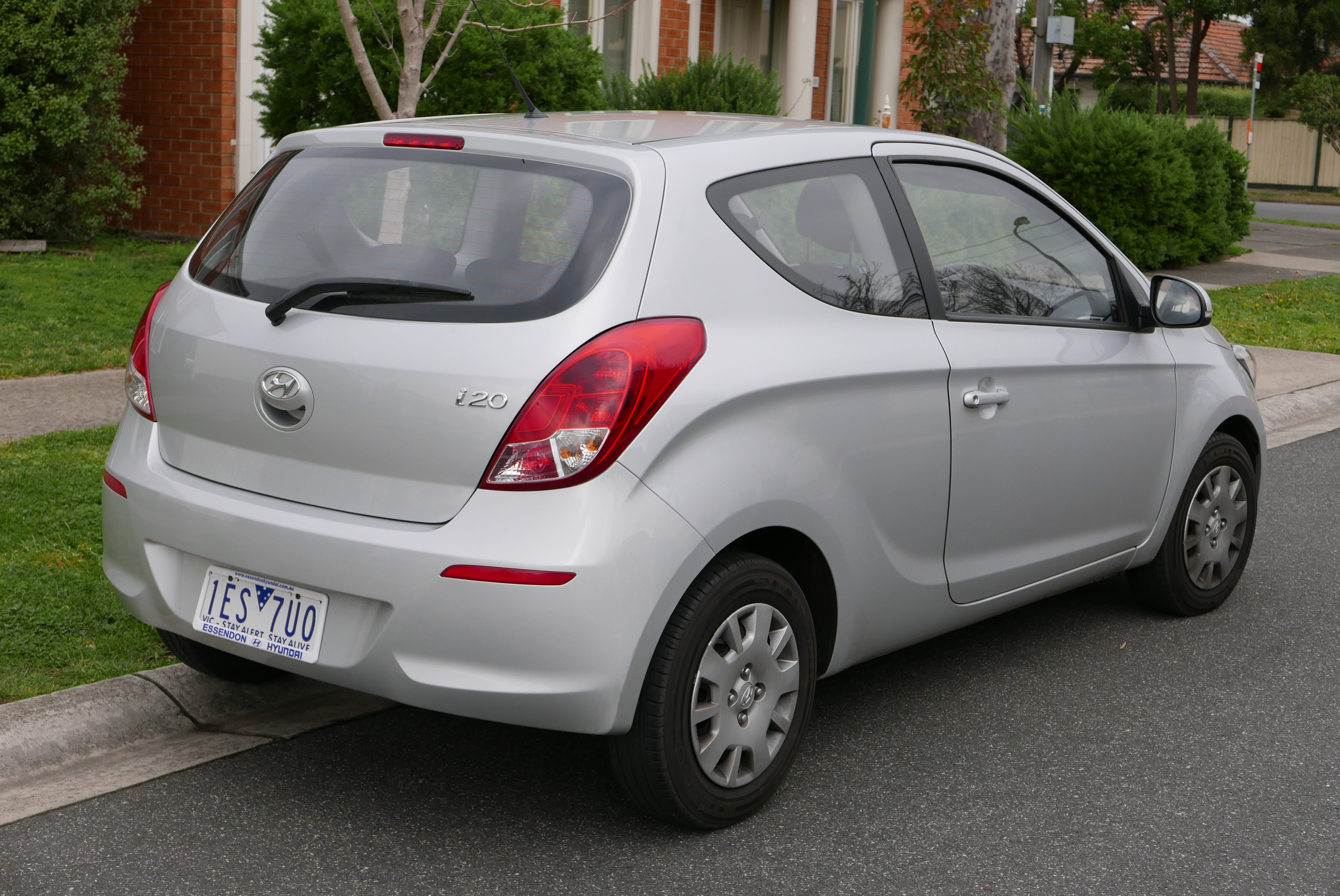
Rear (3-door)

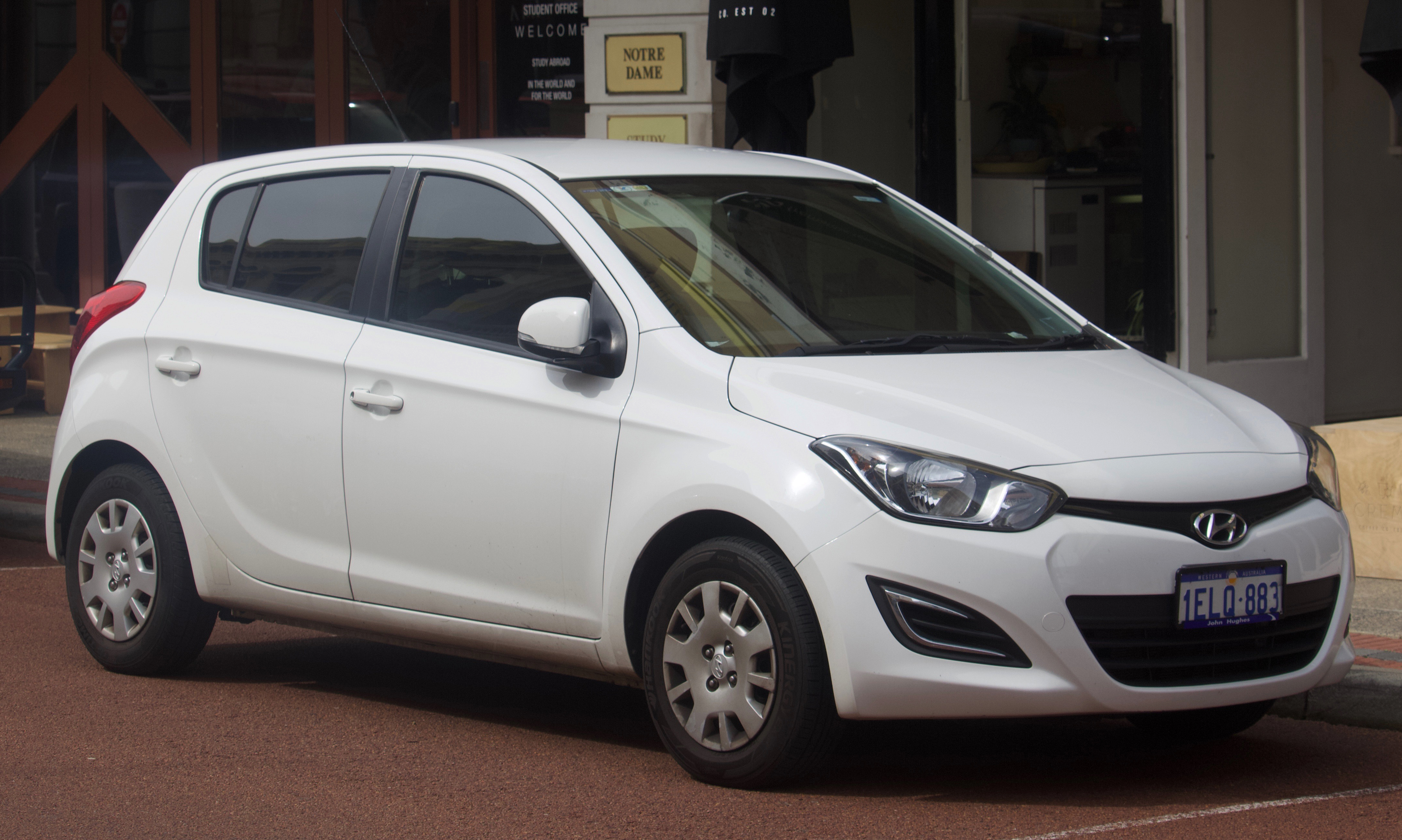
Front (5-door)

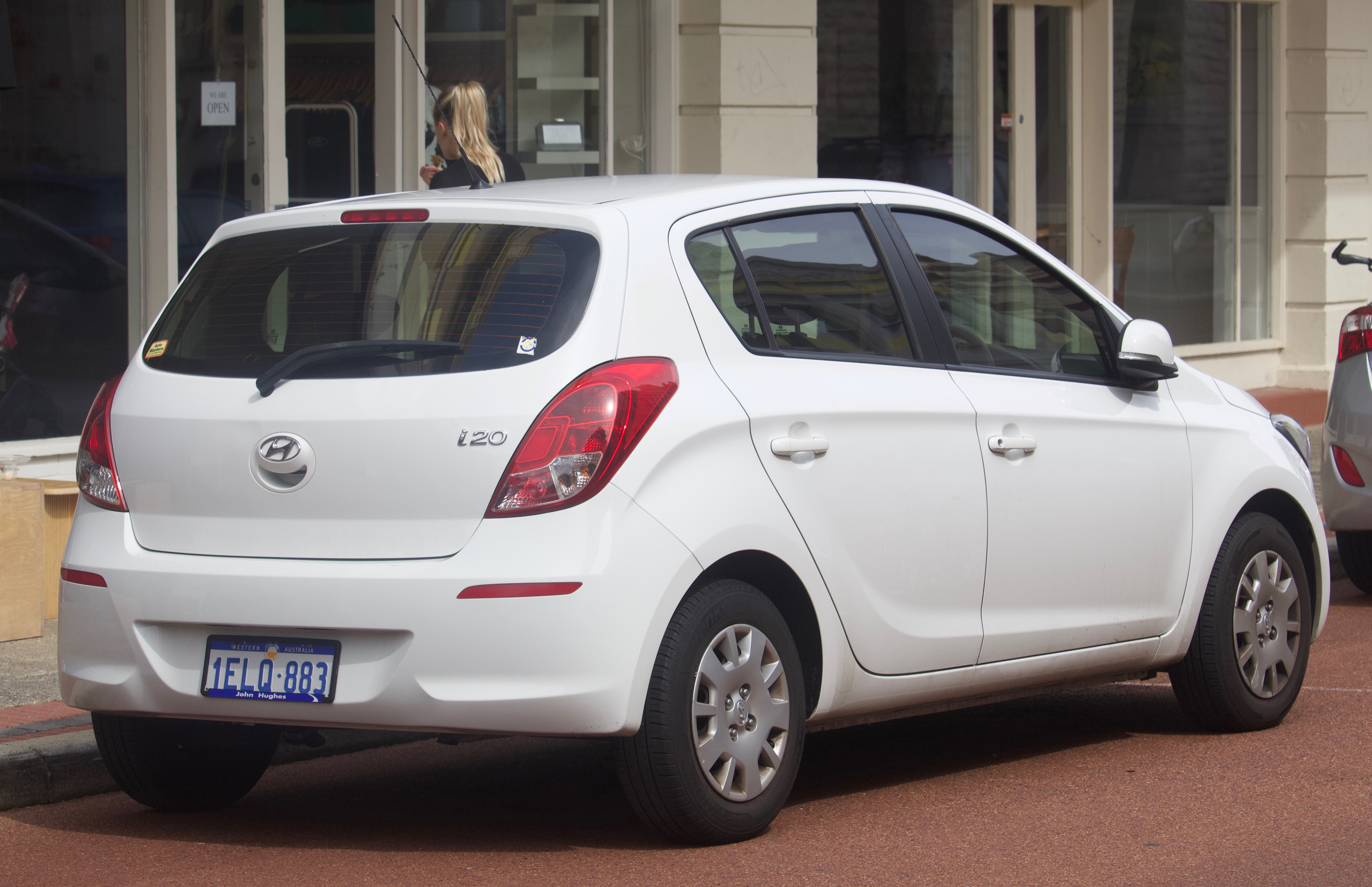
Rear (5-door)

== Second generation (GB/IB; 2014) ==
Second generation
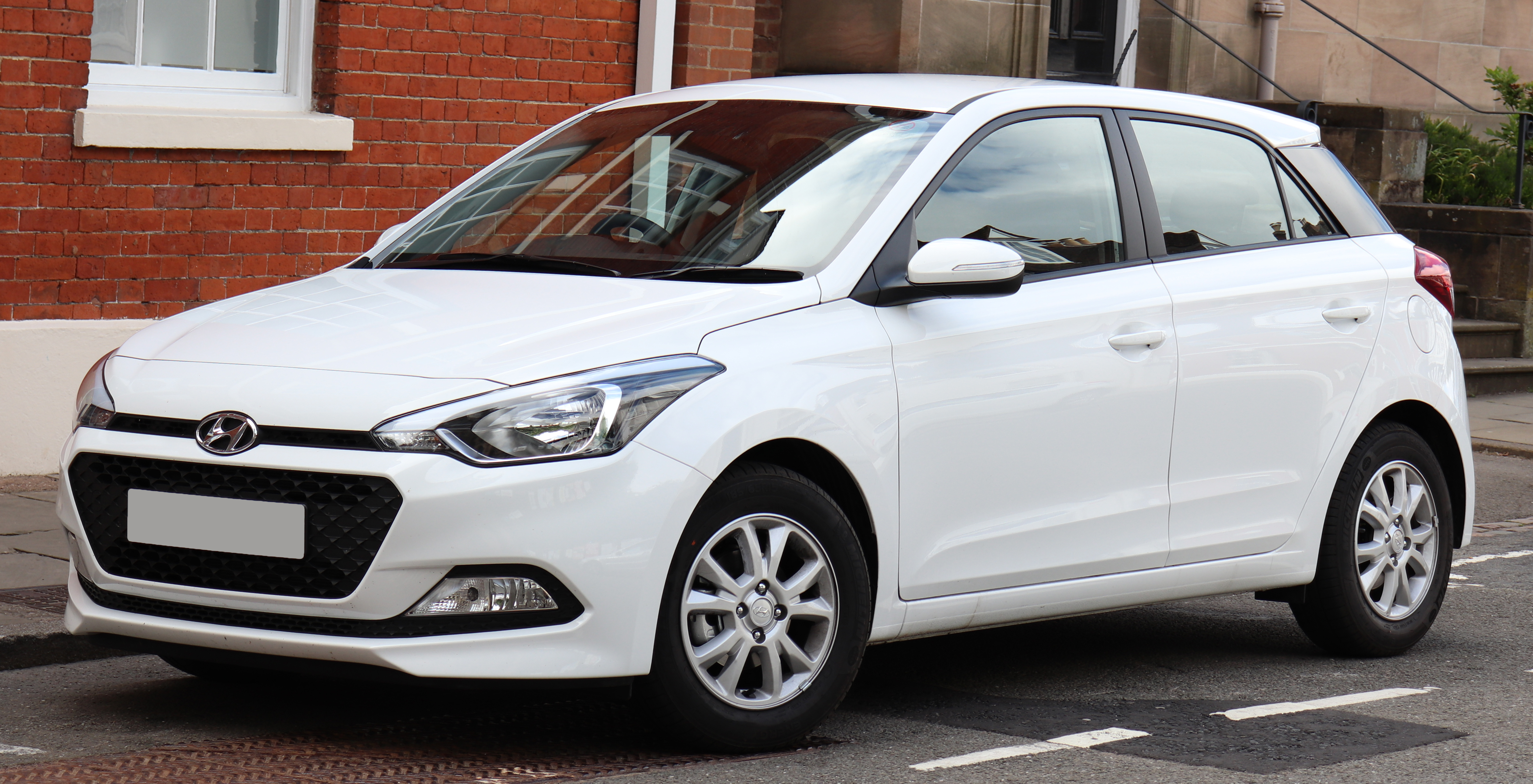

Overview
- Model code: GB (Turkish production); IB (Indian production)
- Also called: Hyundai Elite i20 (India, IB)
- Production: 2014–2020
- Assembly: Turkey: İzmit (HAOS, GB); India: Chennai (HMIL, IB); Iran: Bam, Kerman (KMC); Algeria: Tiaret (TMC)
- Designer: Casey Hyun

Body and chassis
- Body style: 3-door hatchback; 5-door hatchback
- Platform: Hyundai-Kia GB (GB); Hyundai-Kia PB (IB)
- Related: Hyundai Accent/Verna (RB); Hyundai Creta (GS); Kia Rio (YB); Kia Rio (FB); Kia Stonic

Powertrain
- Engine: Petrol: 1.0 L Kappa II T-GDI I3; 1.2 L Kappa II MPi I4; 1.25 L Kappa II MPi I4; 1.4 L Kappa II MPi I4; Diesel: 1.1 L U CRDi I3; 1.4 L U CRDi I4
- Transmission: 5-speed manual; 6-speed manual; 4-speed automatic; 7-speed DCT; CVT

Dimensions
- Wheelbase: 2,570 mm (101.2 in)
- Length: 4,035 mm (158.9 in); 3,985 mm (156.9 in) (IB)
- Width: 1,734 mm (68.3 in)
- Height: 1,474 mm (58.0 in)

Chronology
- Predecessor: Hyundai Grand Avega (Indonesia)
- Successor: Hyundai Bayon (i20 Active)

The second generation i20 has a new exterior and interior design, and a new 1.4-litre diesel engine.

It was launched in August 2014 in India, and in November 2014 in Europe. The design of the car employs Hyundai's 'Fluidic Sculpture 2.0' design philosophy. The design for the car has been developed at Hyundai's design facilities in Rüsselsheim, Germany.

Some of the design features of the new i20 include trapezoidal fog lamps, black C-pillar block, wrap around tail lamps, re-worked headlights and the hexagonal front grille. The interiors feature a black and beige dual-tone dashboard, steering-mounted audio controls, Bluetooth-integrated 2 DIN audio with USB and AUX inputs with 1 GB internal storage, rear AC vents, a dedicated engine start/stop button, and automatic climate control. The i20 5-door was initially designed with boomerang-shaped tail lights (as visible on spyshots), but the whole rear part of the vehicle has been redesigned before launch.

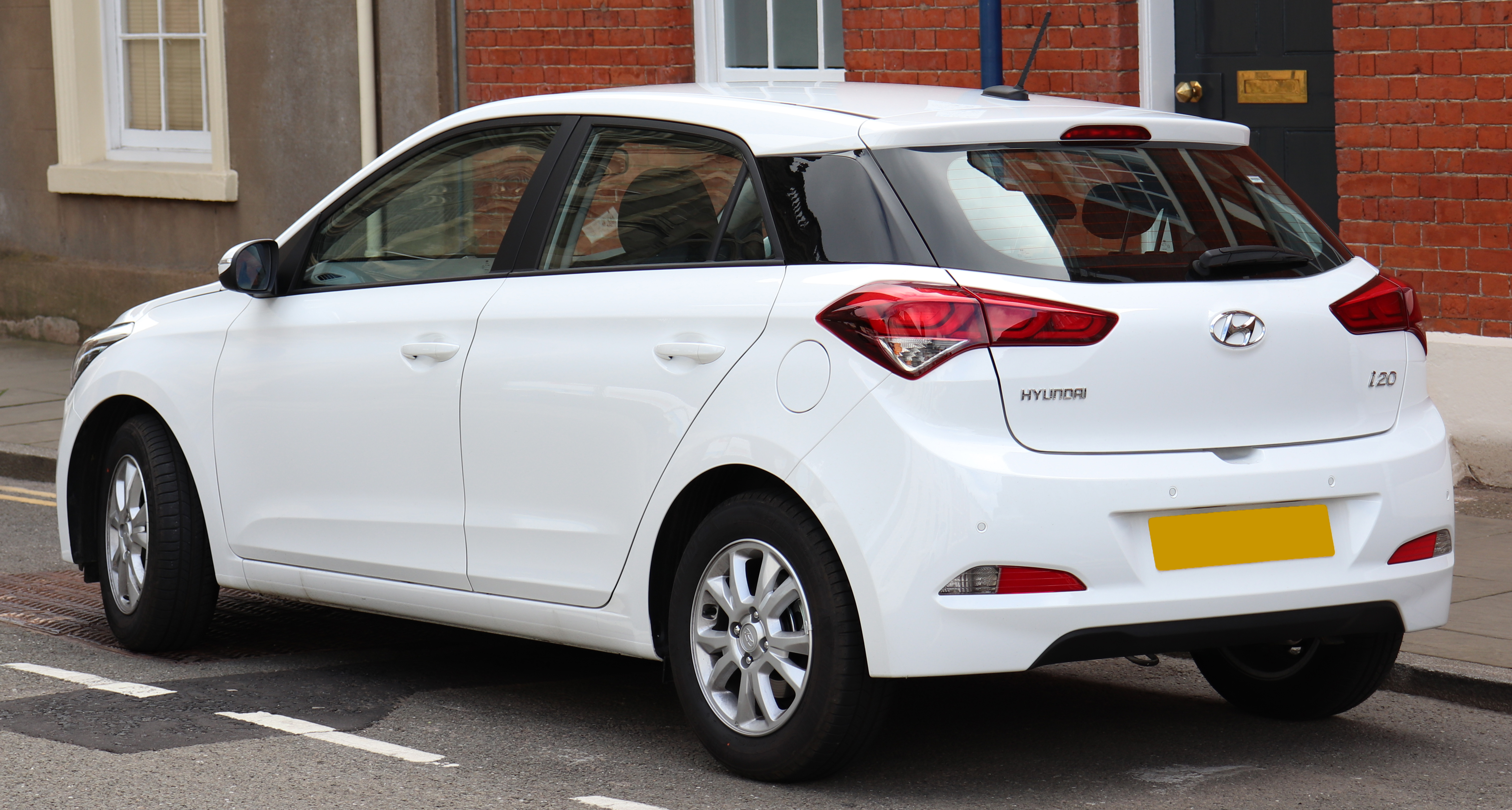
Rear view (5-door)

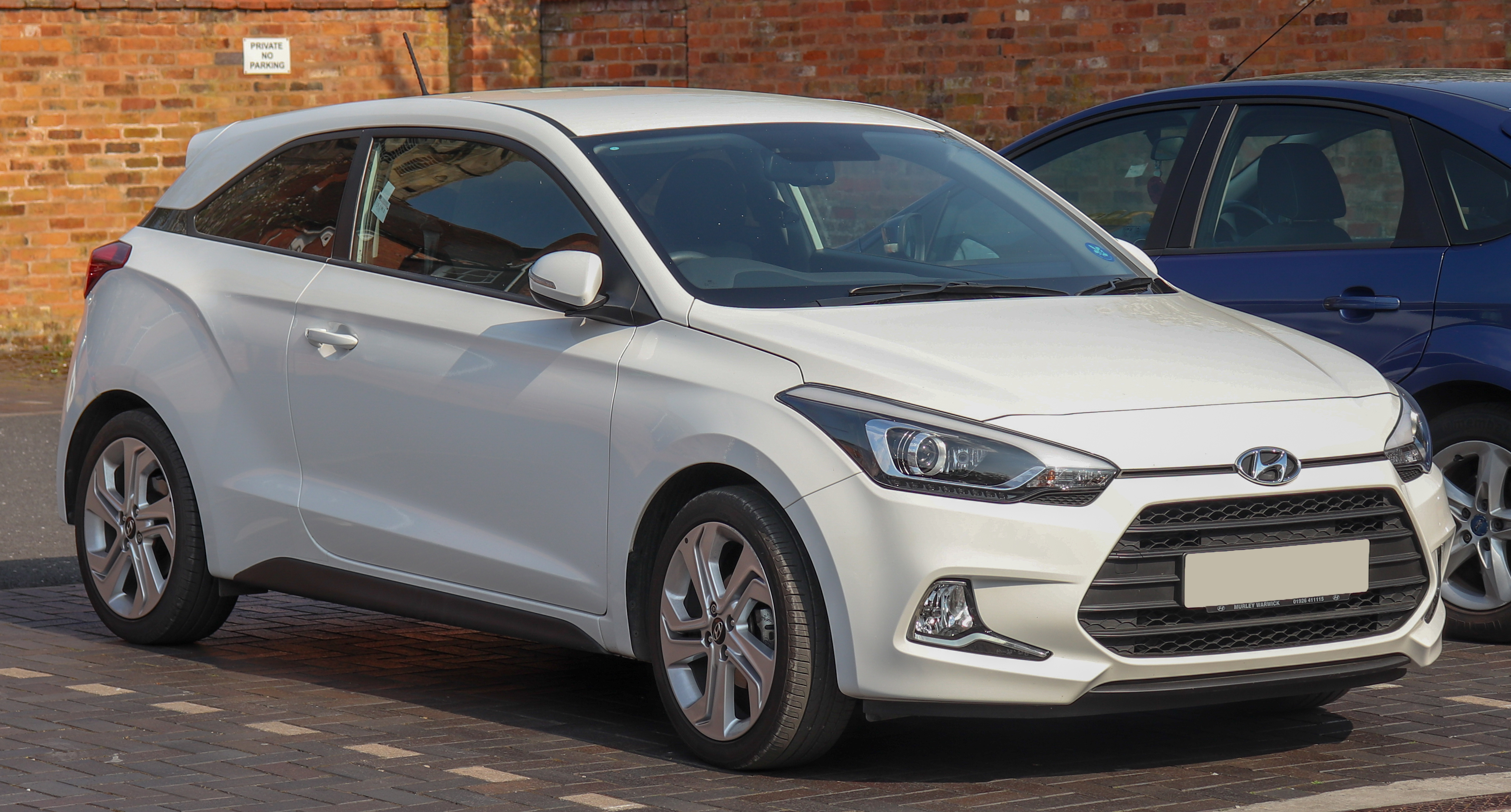
Hyundai i20 Coupe

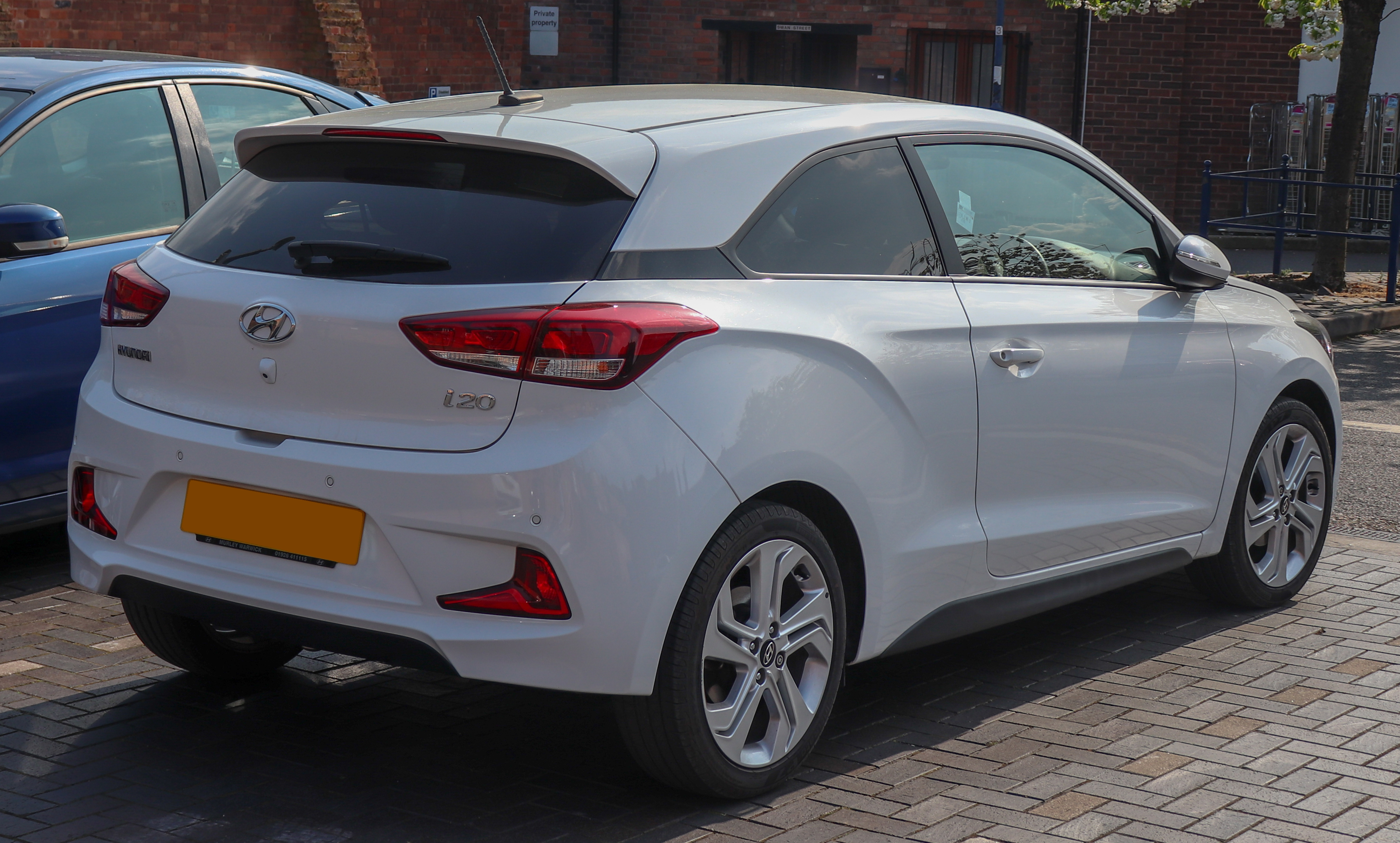
Hyundai i20 Coupe

=== India (Elite i20; IB) ===
The second generation i20 was launched in August 2014 in India as the Elite i20. It eventually won the 2015 Indian Car Of The Year (ICOTY) in December 2014. At launch, ten variants and two engine options were offered in the market. The car also has a higher ground clearance than before, 170 mm as against 165 mm of the old i20. The i20 has 326 litres of boot space.

The i20 was powered by a 1.2-litre Kappa Dual VTVT petrol engine and 1.4-litre U2 CRDi diesel engine. The hatchback had safety features such as ABS, dual front airbags and seat belt pretensioners as standard while rear-view camera with EOM display, headlamp escort function, reverse parking sensors and six airbags are available in higher variants.

=== Facelift ===
Launched at the 2018 Auto Expo in India, the car features new front and rear bumpers, new boot lid which now also included rear number plate slot, moved from the rear bumper, and a new tail lamp design. Changes to the interior including the addition of a new infotainment system equipped with Apple CarPlay and Android Auto. The 4-speed torque converter automatic transmission was replaced with a CVT for petrol engine variants. Europe gets the casual 5-speed manual and 7DCT (7 steps Dual-clutch transmission).

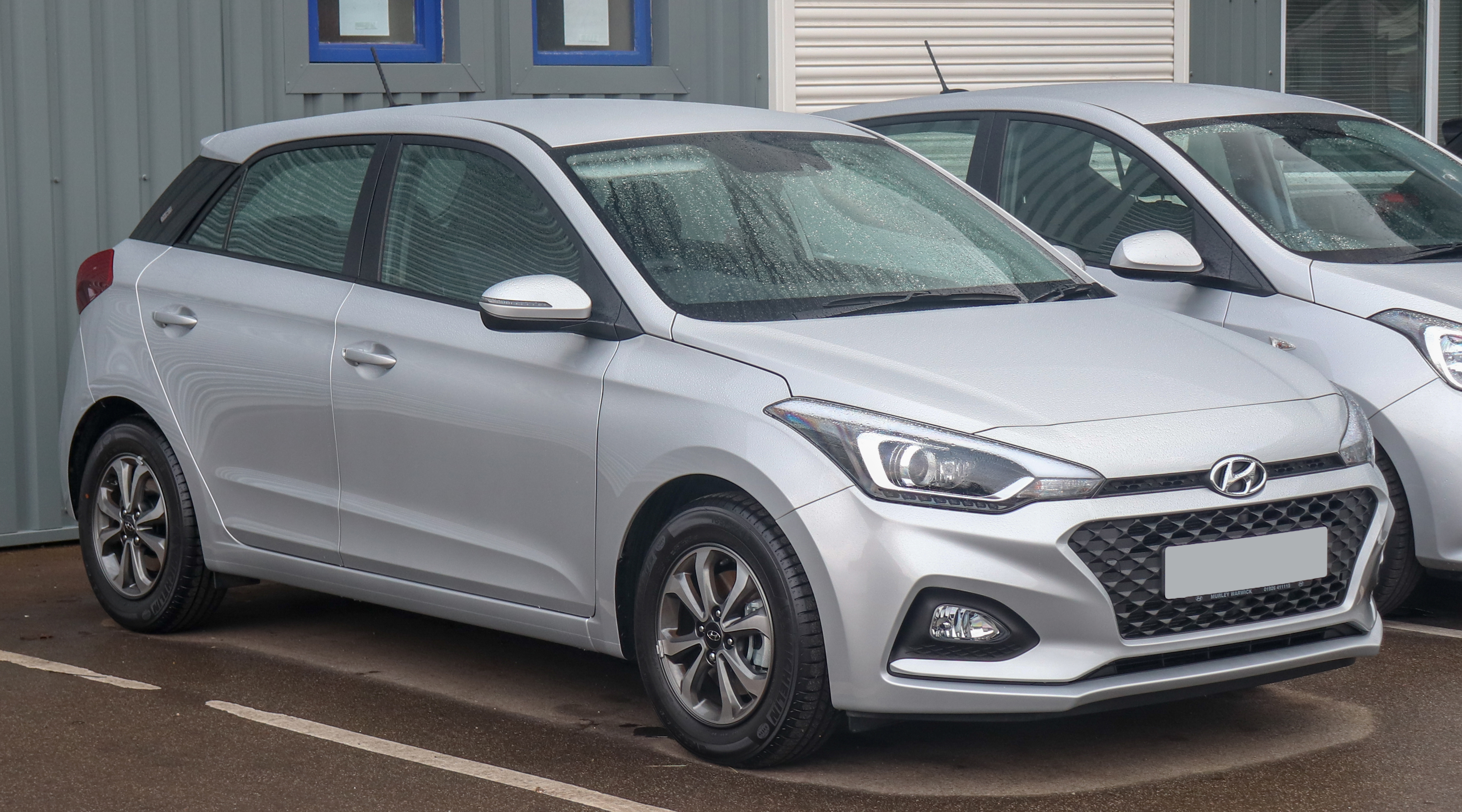
Hyundai i20 (GB; facelift)

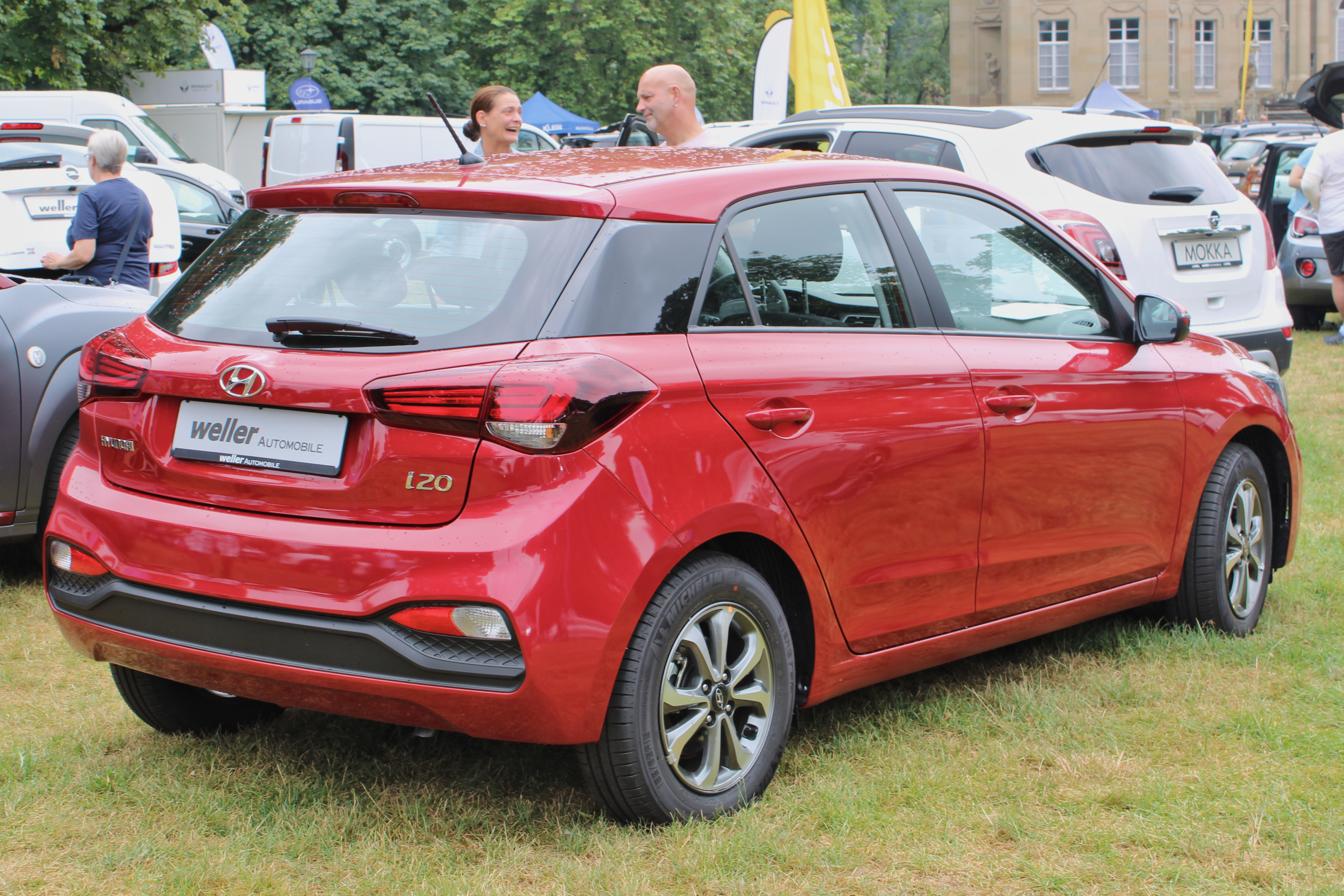
Hyundai i20 (GB; facelift)

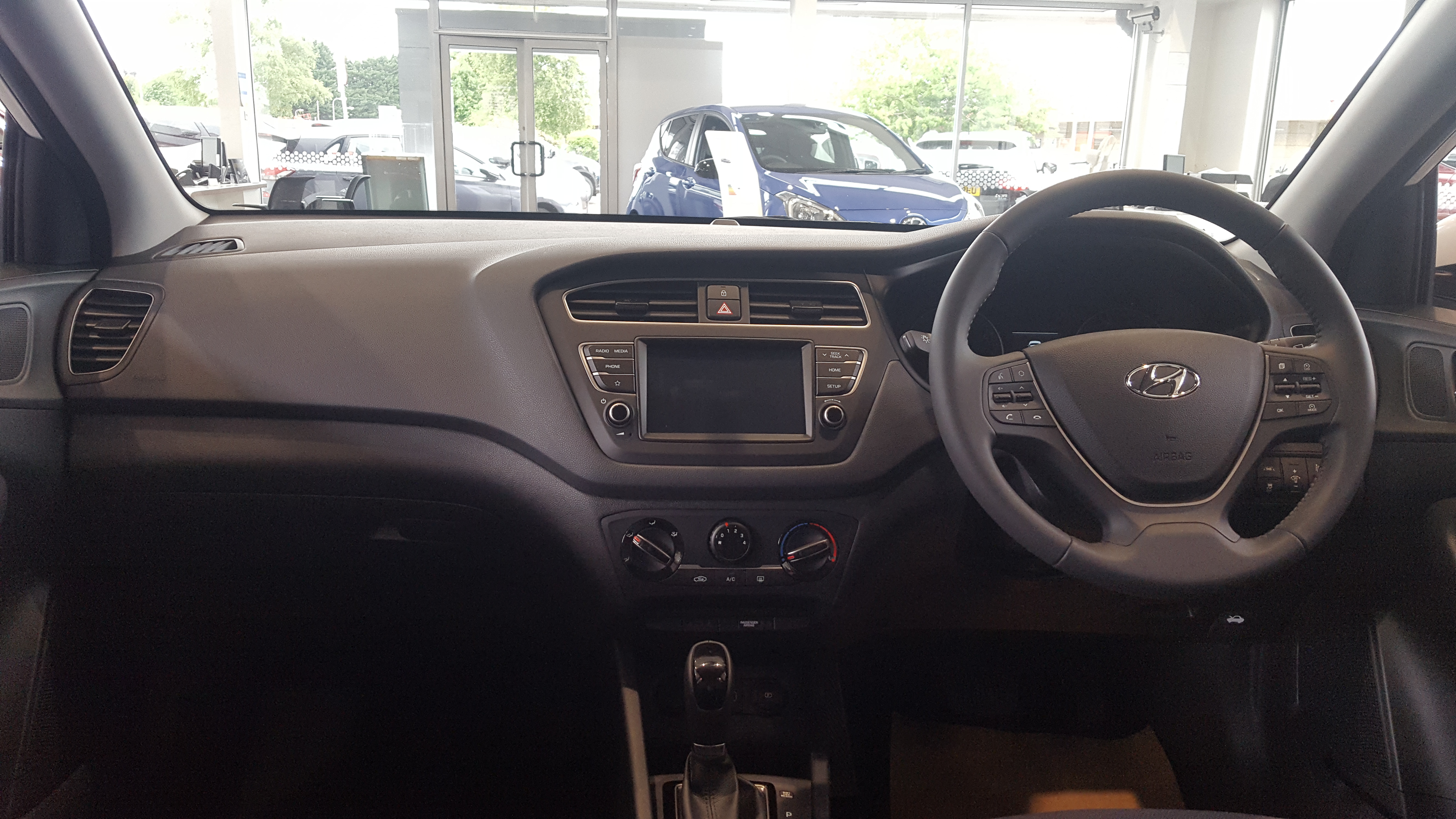
Interior (facelift)

=== i20 Active ===
A crossover-styled variant called the i20 Active, was launched in India on 17 March 2015 and in Europe at the Frankfurt Motor Show in September 2015. It features front, rear and side black plastic cladding, along with roof rails, rugged-looking fuel cap, and both front and rear aluminum skid plates. The i20 Active also gets cornering lamps, aluminum pedals and roof rails, along with a fuel lid cover. The ground clearance of the Indian-spec i20 Active has been increased to 190 mm, which is a 20 mm gain over the standard i20 at 170 mm.

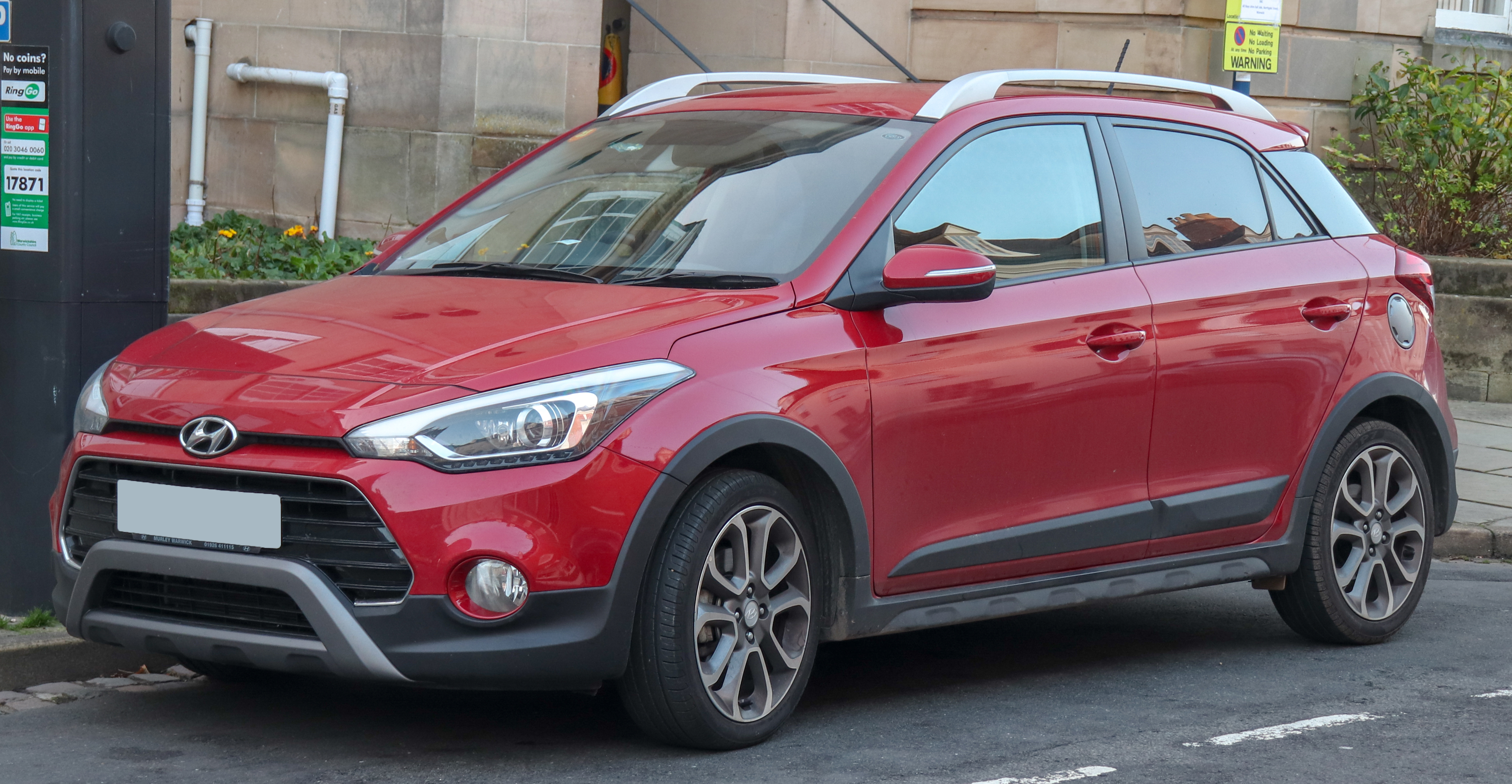
Hyundai i20 Active (GB; pre-facelift)

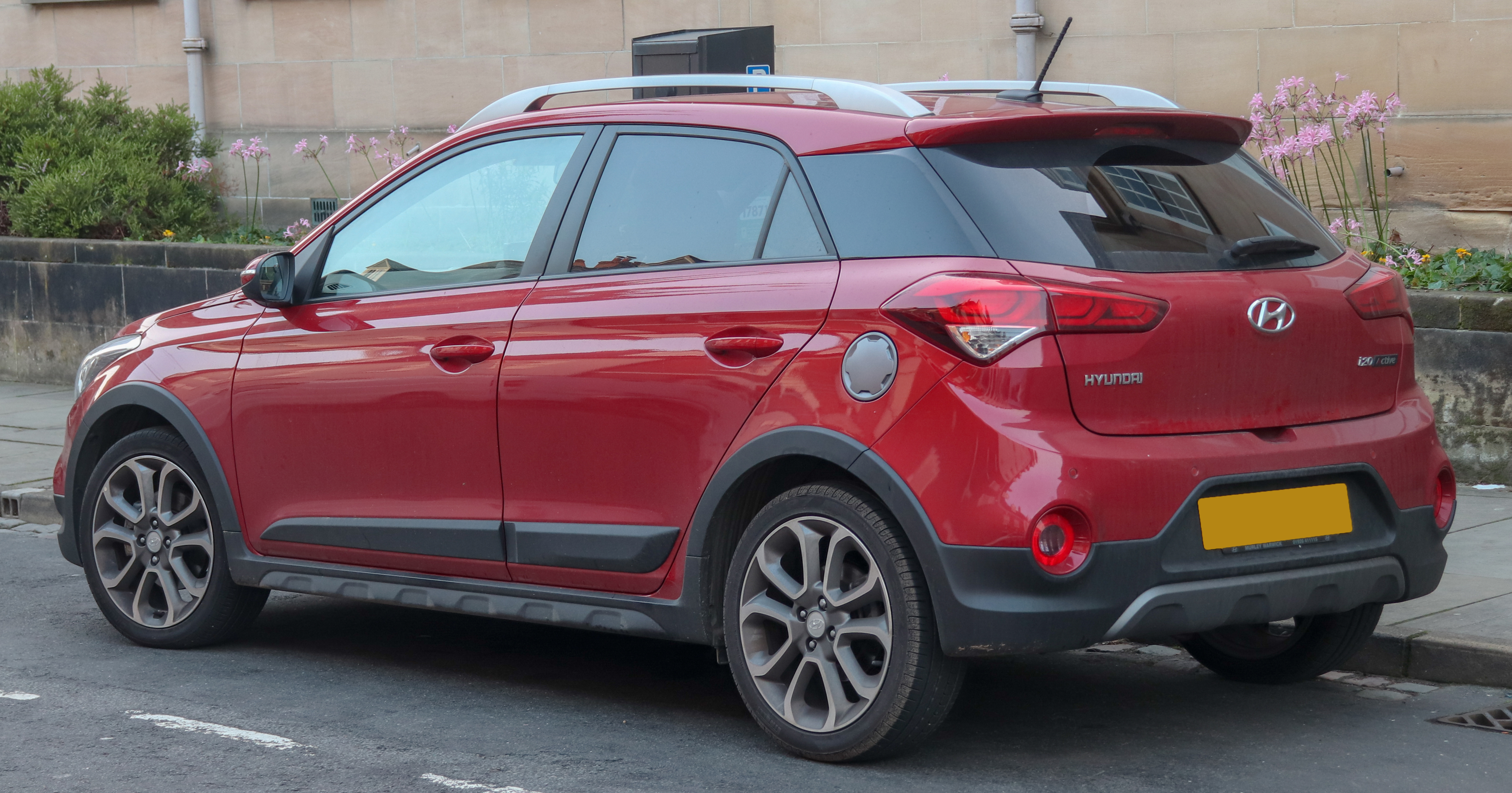
Hyundai i20 Active (GB; pre-facelift)

=== Powertrain ===
==== GB models ====
| Model | Year | Transmission | Power | Torque | 0–100 km/h (0-62 mph) (official) | Top speed (official) |
Petrol
| 1.0 L Kappa II T-GDi | 2014–2020 | 5-speed manual | 74 kW; 99 hp (100 PS) @ 4,500 rpm | 172 N⋅m; 127 lbf⋅ft (17.5 kg⋅m) @ 1,500-4,000 rpm | 10.8 s | 188 km/h (117 mph) |
| 1.0 L Kappa II T-GDi | 2014–2020 | 7-speed DCT | 74 kW; 99 hp (100 PS) @ 4,500 rpm | 172 N⋅m; 127 lbf⋅ft (17.5 kg⋅m) @ 1,500-4,000 rpm | 11.4 s | 182 km/h (113 mph) |
| 1.0 L Kappa II T-GDi | 2014–2020 | 6-speed manual | 88 kW; 118 hp (120 PS) @ 6,000 rpm | 172 N⋅m; 127 lbf⋅ft (17.5 kg⋅m) @ 1,500-4,000 rpm | 10.2 s | 190 km/h (118 mph) |
| 1.25 L Kappa II MPi | 2014–2020 | 5-speed manual | 55 kW; 74 hp (75 PS) @ 5,500 rpm | 122 N⋅m; 90 lbf⋅ft (12.4 kg⋅m) @ 4,000 rpm | 13.6 s | 160 km/h (99 mph) |
| 1.25 L Kappa II MPi | 2014–2020 | 5-speed manual | 62 kW; 83 hp (84 PS) @ 6,000 rpm | 122 N⋅m; 90 lbf⋅ft (12.4 kg⋅m) @ 4,000 rpm | 12.8 s | 170 km/h (106 mph) |
| 1.4 L Kappa II MPi | 2014–2020 | 6-speed manual | 74 kW; 99 hp (100 PS) @ 6,000 rpm | 134 N⋅m; 99 lbf⋅ft (13.7 kg⋅m) @ 3,500 rpm | 11.6 s | 184 km/h (114 mph) |
| 1.4 L Kappa II MPi | 2014–2020 | 4-speed automatic | 74 kW; 99 hp (100 PS) @ 6,000 rpm | 134 N⋅m; 99 lbf⋅ft (13.7 kg⋅m) @ 3,500 rpm | 13.2 s | 170 km/h (106 mph) |
Diesel
| 1.1 L U II CRDi | 2014–2020 | 6-speed manual | 55 kW; 74 hp (75 PS) @ 4,000 rpm | 179 N⋅m; 132 lbf⋅ft (18.3 kg⋅m) @ 1,750-2,500 rpm | 15.7 s | 161 km/h (100 mph) |
| 1.4 L U II CRDi | 2014–2020 | 6-speed manual | 66 kW; 89 hp (90 PS) @ 4,000 rpm | 240 N⋅m; 177 lbf⋅ft (24.5 kg⋅m) @ 1,500-2,500 rpm | 12.1 s | 175 km/h (109 mph) |

==== IB models ====
| Model | Year | Transmission | Power | Torque | 0–100 km/h (0-62 mph) (official) | Top speed (official) |
Petrol
| 1.2 L Kappa II MPi | 2014–2020 | 5-speed manual | 60 kW; 81 hp (82 PS) @ 6,000 rpm | 115 N⋅m; 85 lbf⋅ft (11.7 kg⋅m) @ 4,000 rpm | | |
| 1.2 L Kappa II MPi | 2014–2020 | CVT | 60 kW; 81 hp (82 PS) @ 6,000 rpm | 115 N⋅m; 85 lbf⋅ft (11.7 kg⋅m) @ 4,000 rpm | | |
| 1.4 L Kappa II MPi | 2014–2020 | 6-speed manual | 74 kW; 99 hp (100 PS) @ 6,000 rpm | 134 N⋅m; 99 lbf⋅ft (13.7 kg⋅m) @ 3,500 rpm | 11.6 s | 184 km/h (114 mph) |
| 1.4 L Kappa II MPi | 2014–2020 | 4-speed automatic | 74 kW; 99 hp (100 PS) @ 6,000 rpm | 134 N⋅m; 99 lbf⋅ft (13.7 kg⋅m) @ 3,500 rpm | 13.2 s | 170 km/h (106 mph) |
Diesel
| 1.4 L U II CRDi | 2014–2020 | 6-speed manual | 66 kW; 89 hp (90 PS) @ 4,000 rpm | 240 N⋅m; 177 lbf⋅ft (24.5 kg⋅m) @ 1,500-2,500 rpm | 12.1 s | 175 km/h (109 mph) |
| 1.4 L U II CRDi | 2014–2020 | 4-speed automatic | 66 kW; 89 hp (90 PS) @ 4,000 rpm | 240 N⋅m; 177 lbf⋅ft (24.5 kg⋅m) @ 1,500-2,500 rpm | 12.1 s | 175 km/h (109 mph) |

=== Safety ===
ANCAP test results* Hyundai i20 all Hatch & Cross variants (2015, aligned with Euro NCAP)
| Test | Points | % |
|---|---|---|
| Overall: | 5 /5 stars | |
| Adult occupant: | 32.6 | 85% |
| Child occupant: | 35.8 | 78% |
| Pedestrian: | 28.4 | 79% |
| Safety assist: | 8.3 | 64% |

== Third generation (BC3/BI3; 2020) ==
Third generation
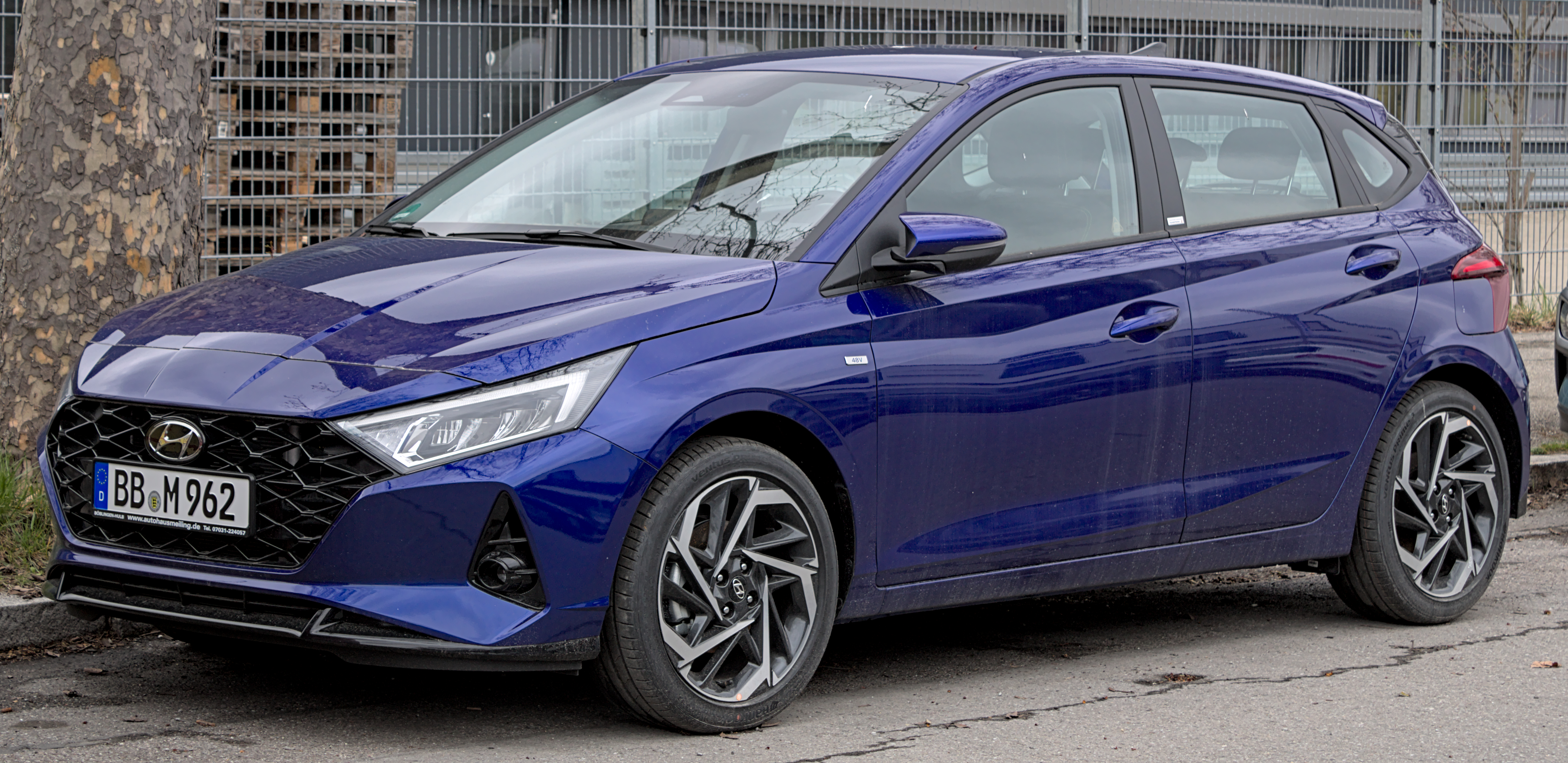
- Pre-facelift i20 (BC3; front)

Overview
- Model code: BC3 (Turkish production); BI3 (Indian production)
- Production: 2020–present
- Assembly: Turkey: İzmit (HAOS); India: Chennai (HMIL)
- Designer: Under the lead of SangYup Lee

Body and chassis
- Body style: 5-door hatchback
- Platform: Hyundai-Kia K2
- Related: Hyundai Bayon (BC3); Hyundai Venue; Hyundai Creta (SU2); Hyundai Accent/Verna (HC)

Powertrain
- Engine: Petrol: 1.0 L Kappa II T-GDi I3; 1.0 L Smartstream G1.0 T-GDi I3 (mild hybrid); 1.2 L Kappa II MPi I4; 1.2 L Smartstream G1.2 MPi I4; 1.4 L Kappa II MPi I4; 1.6 L Smartstream G1.6 T-GDi I4; Diesel: 1.5 L U II CRDi I4
- Transmission: 5-speed manual; 6-speed manual; 6-speed automatic; 6-speed semi-automatic; 7-speed dual clutch automatic; CVT
- Hybrid drivetrain: Mild hybrid (1.0L GDI 2020-2024)

Dimensions
- Wheelbase: 2,580 mm (101.6 in)
- Length: 4,040–4,075 mm (159.1–160.4 in) (BC3); 3,995 mm (157.3 in) (BI3)
- Width: 1,750–1,775 mm (68.9–69.9 in) (BC3); 1,775 mm (69.9 in) (BI3)
- Height: 1,440–1,450 mm (56.7–57.1 in) (BC3); 1,505 mm (59.3 in) (BI3)
- Curb weight: 1,013–1,225 kg (2,233–2,701 lb)

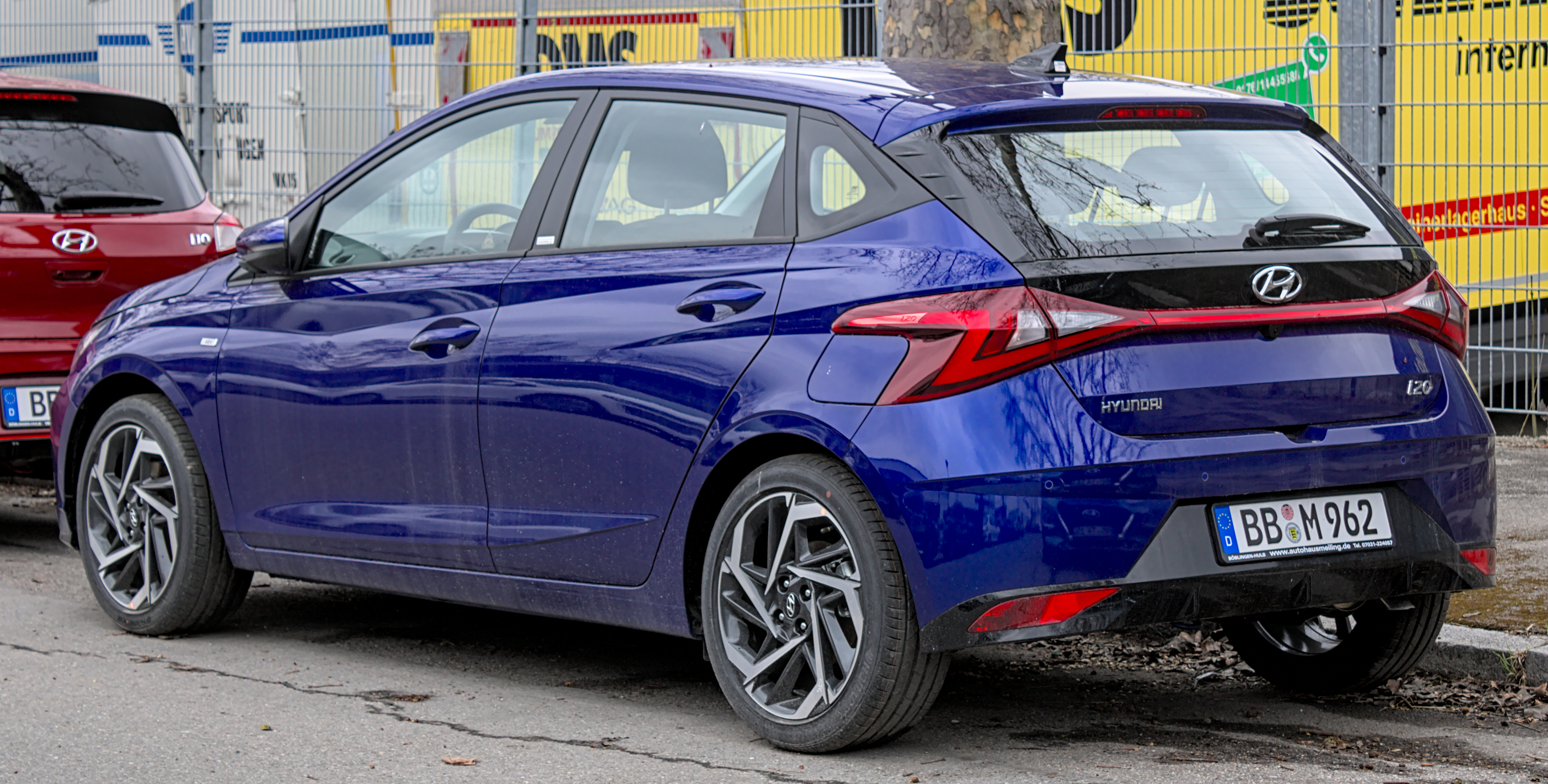
Pre-facelift i20 (BC3; rear)

The third-generation i20 was unveiled online for the European market on 19 February 2020. It was supposed to debut at the 90th Geneva Motor Show in March 2020, but the show and the launch were cancelled due to the COVID-19 pandemic.

The third generation i20 is larger and lower than the previous generation, its design is now employs Hyundai's latest "Sensuous Sportiness" design philosophy, featuring a redesigned exterior and interior styling.

=== Markets ===
==== Europe (BC3) ====
After its debut in February 2020, production for the European market commenced in the Izmit plant in Turkey in August 2020. The plant will produce around 85,000 units of i20 per year, covering about 50% of the global i20 production.

The top spec is equipped with two 10.25-inch displays, one for the instrument gauge cluster and one for the main infotainment display. It is also available with an N Line trim and N performance-oriented variant.

The 1.0L GDI comes with a 48V mild hybrid system, which helps decrease fuel consumption by 3-4%.

In 2021, Hyundai launched the France-only i20 N Line Michel Vaillant limited edition, featuring optional blue and red stickers.

===== Facelift =====
The facelifted i20 was revealed on 10 May 2023.

The mild hybrid is discontinued for the facelift in the UK, remaining available in other markets.

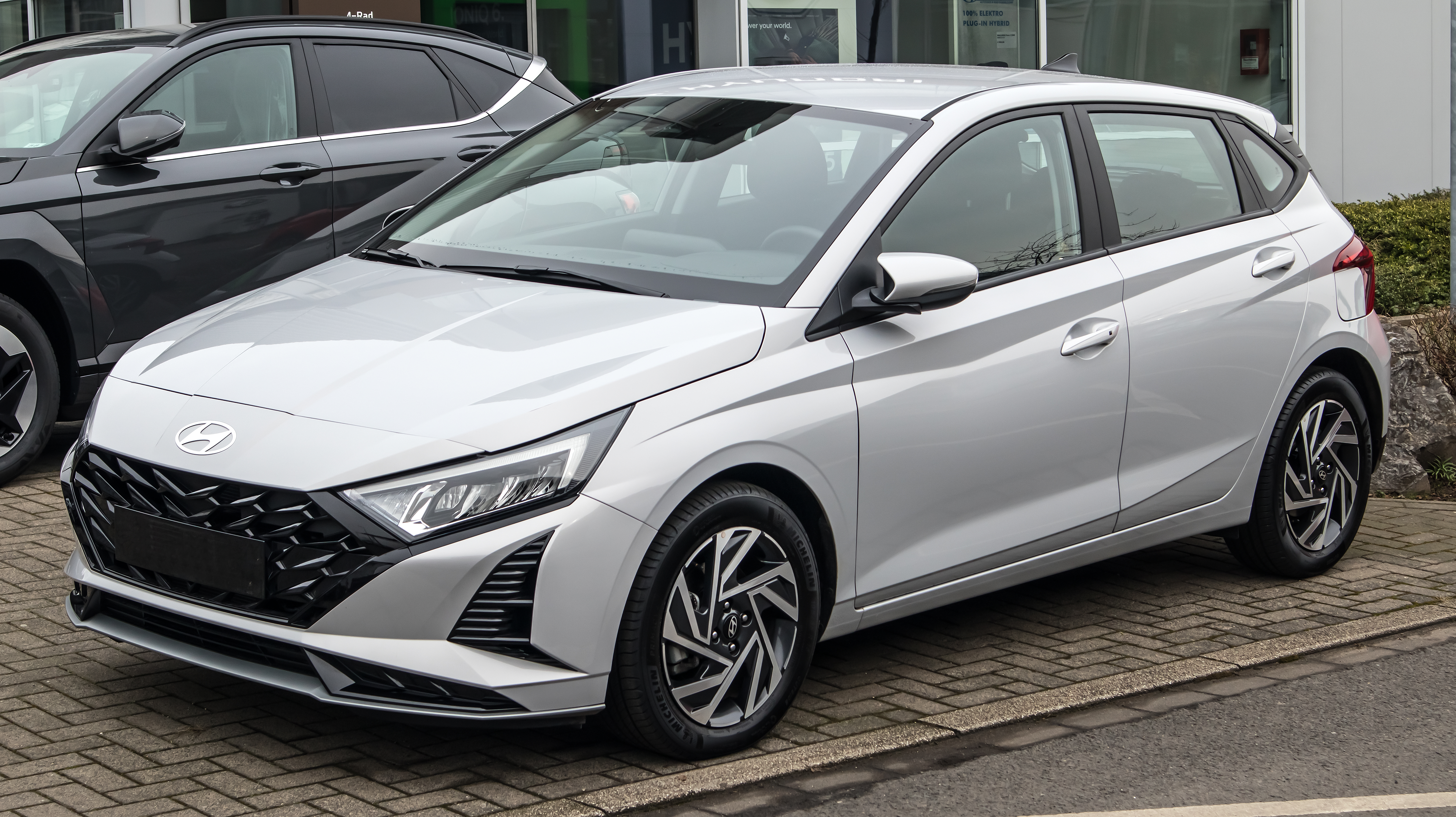
Facelift i20 Trend (BC3; front)

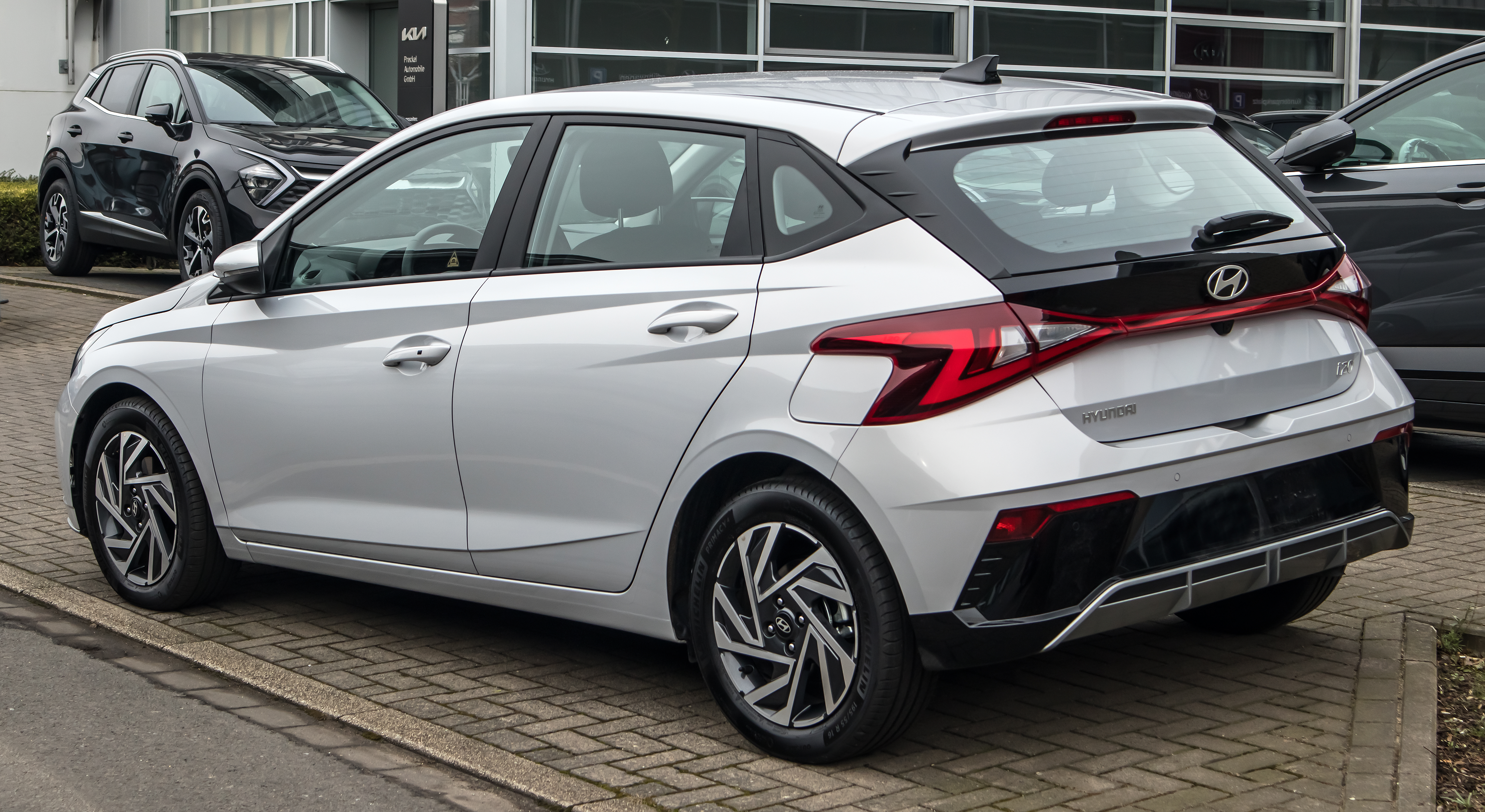
Facelift i20 Trend (BC3; rear)

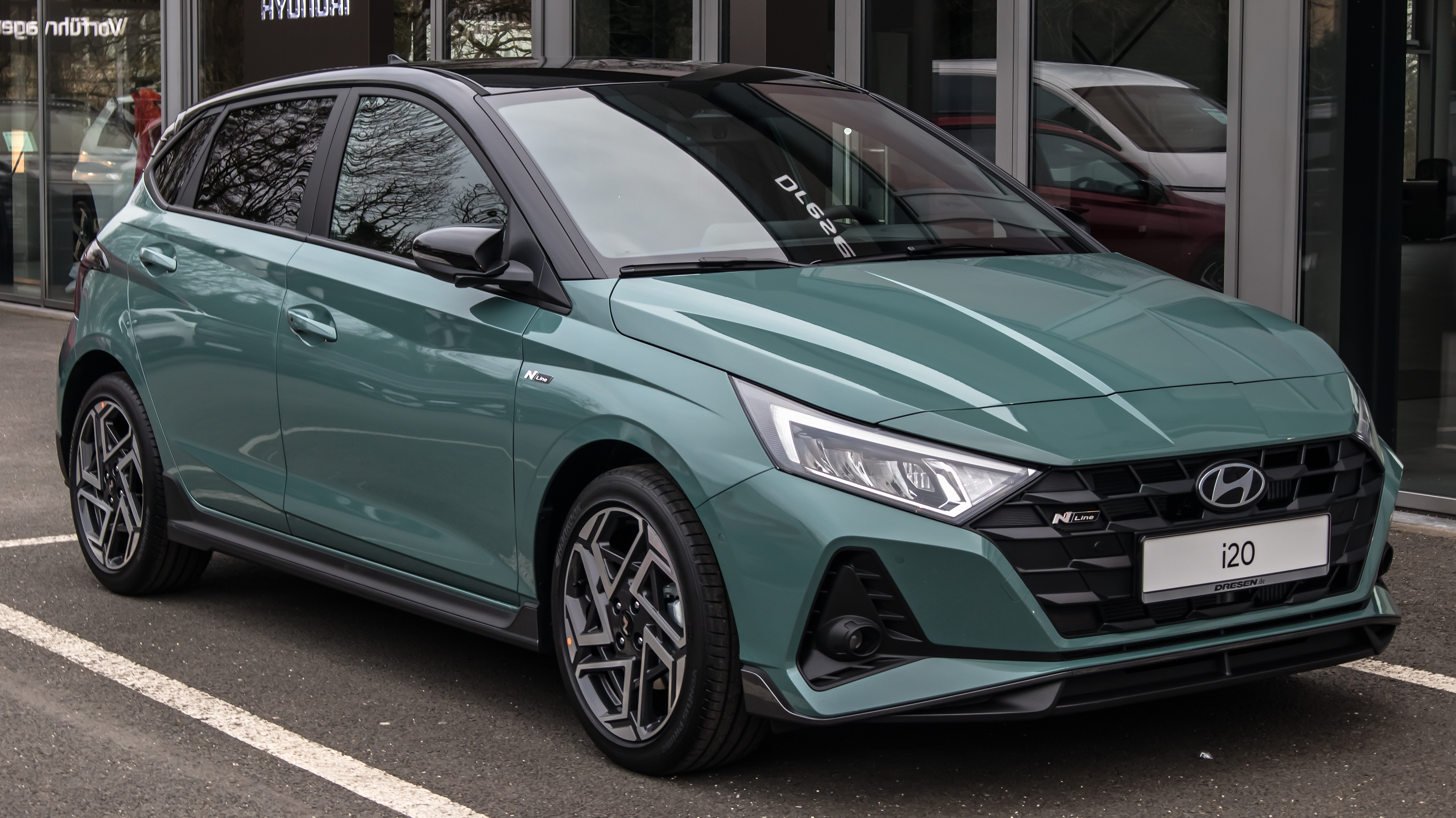
Facelift i20 N Line (BC3; front)

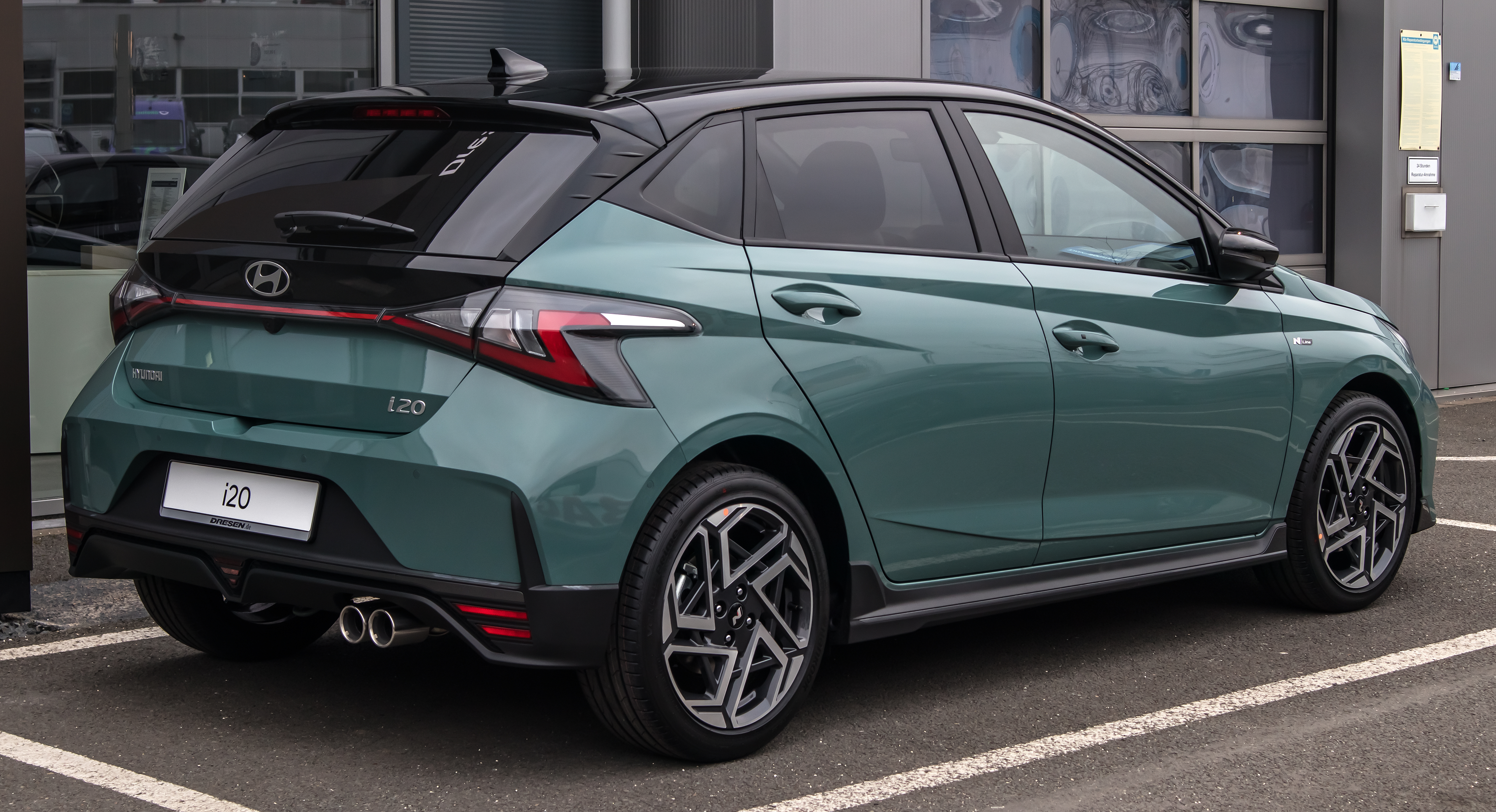
Facelift i20 N Line (BC3; rear)

==== India (BI3) ====
The third-generation i20 was launched in the country on 5 November 2020. It dropped the "Elite" prefix from the previous generation, now simply marketed as the "Hyundai i20". The Indian-market i20, codenamed BI3, is 45 mm (1.8 in) shorter than the European version to circumvent the Indian tax bracket which favours vehicles shorter than 4,000 mm (157.5 in), while it is 25 mm (1.0 in) wider and 55 mm (2.2 in) taller. It is built on the Hyundai-Kia K2 platform shared with other Hyundai-Kia recent compact cars. It is claimed to make use of 66 percent high-strength steel which improves its crash safety.

On 24 August 2021, Hyundai introduced the N Line variant for the BI3 i20.

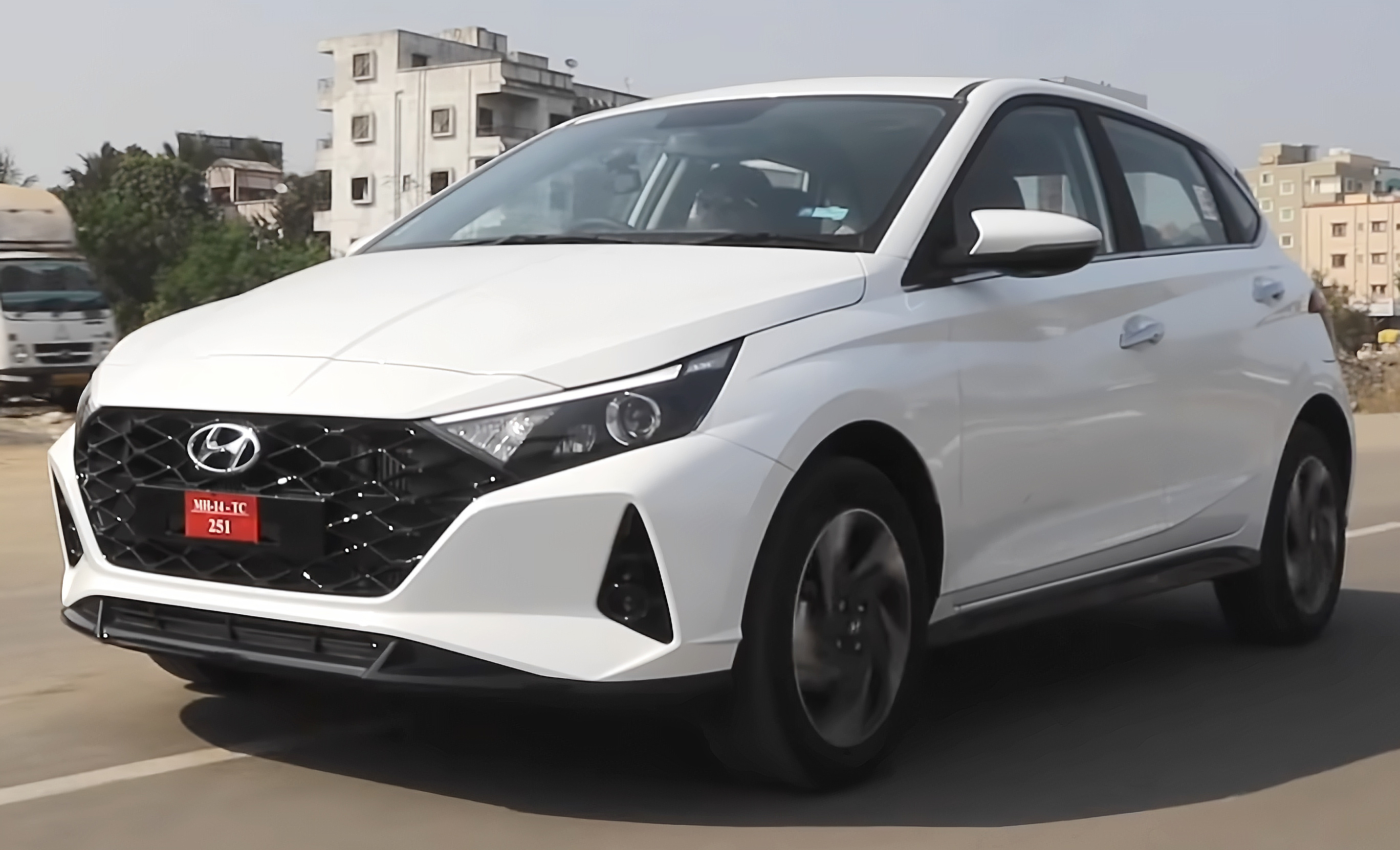
Pre-facelift i20 Asta (BI3; front)

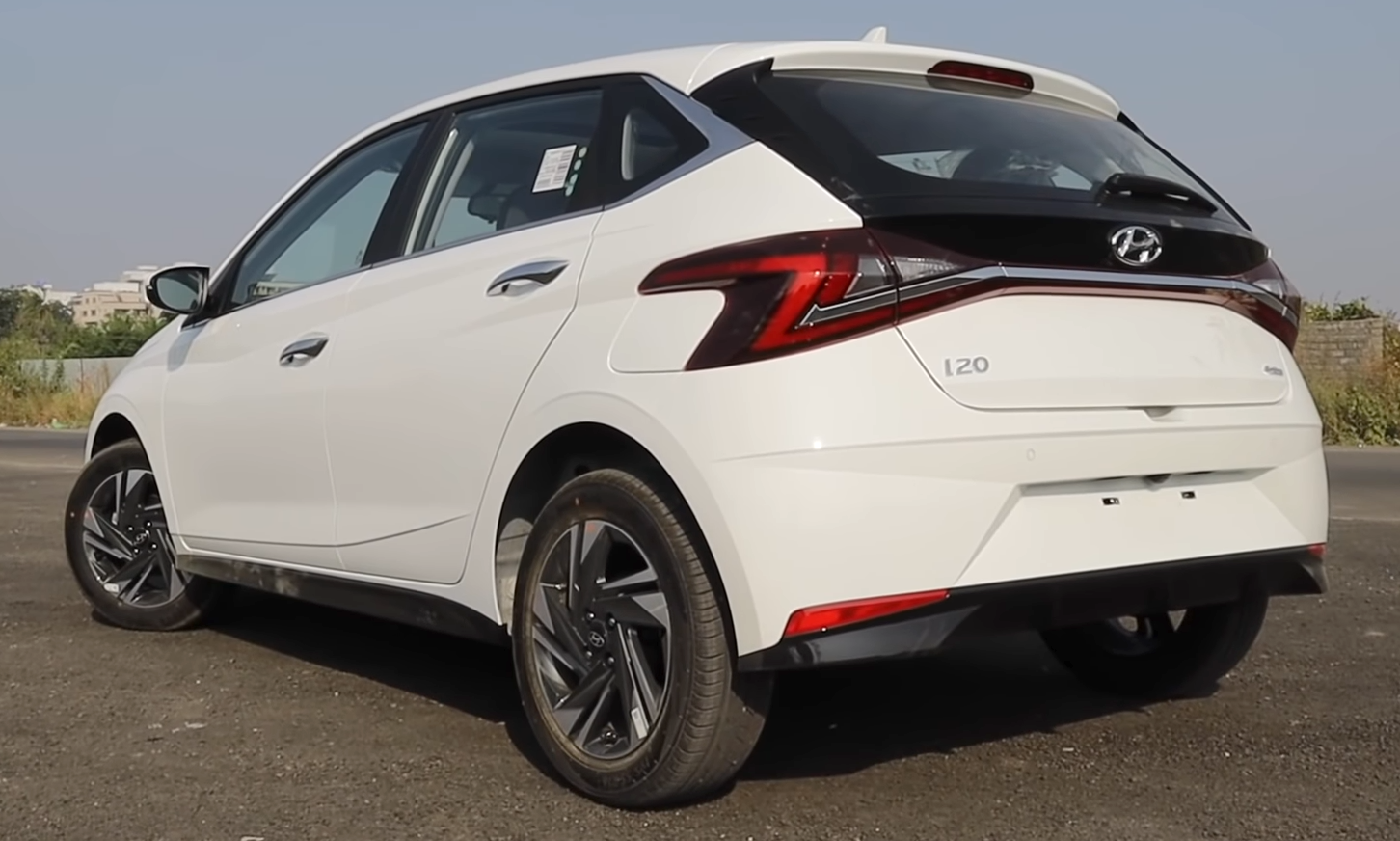
Pre-facelift i20 Asta (BI3; rear)

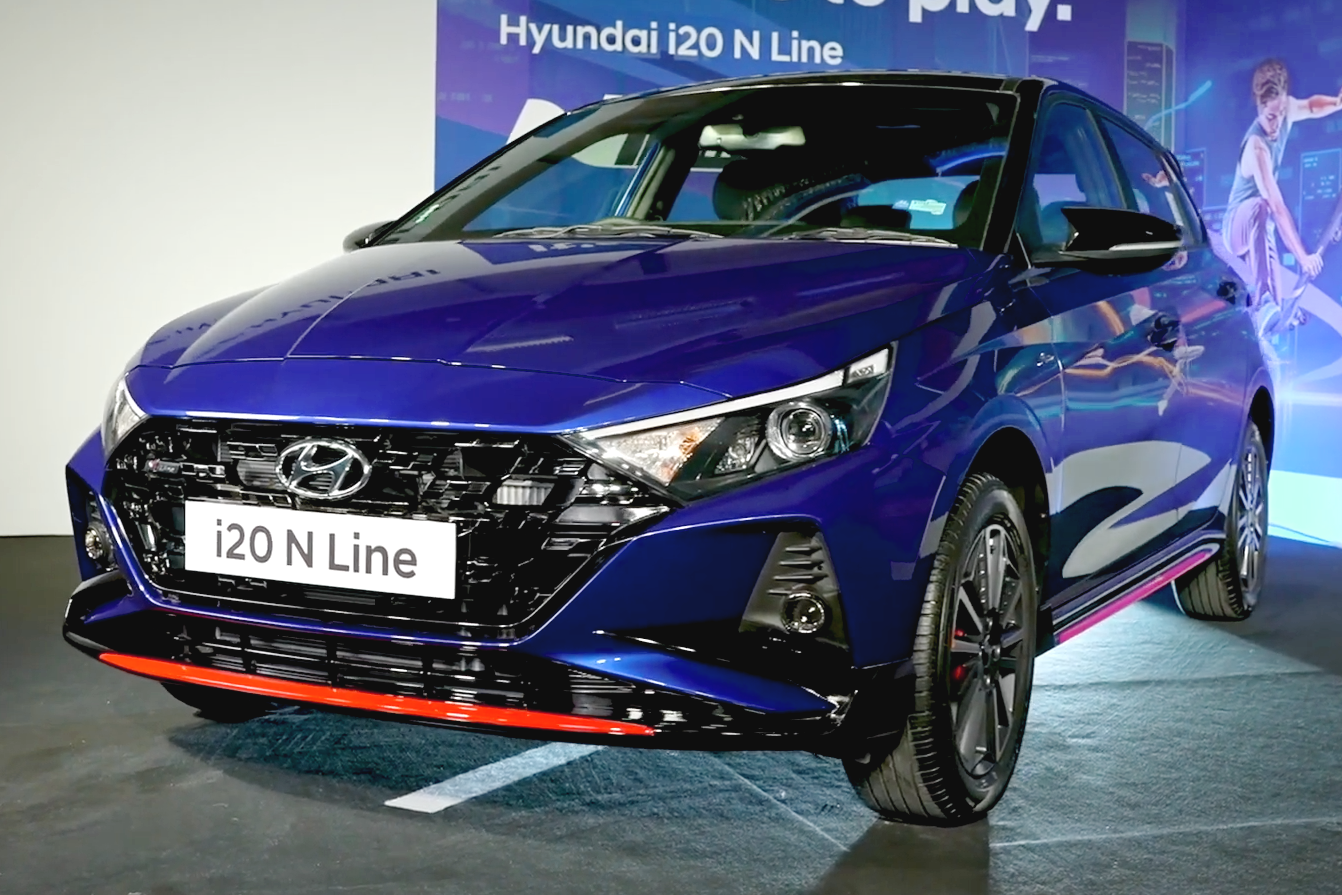
Pre-facelift i20 N Line (BI3)

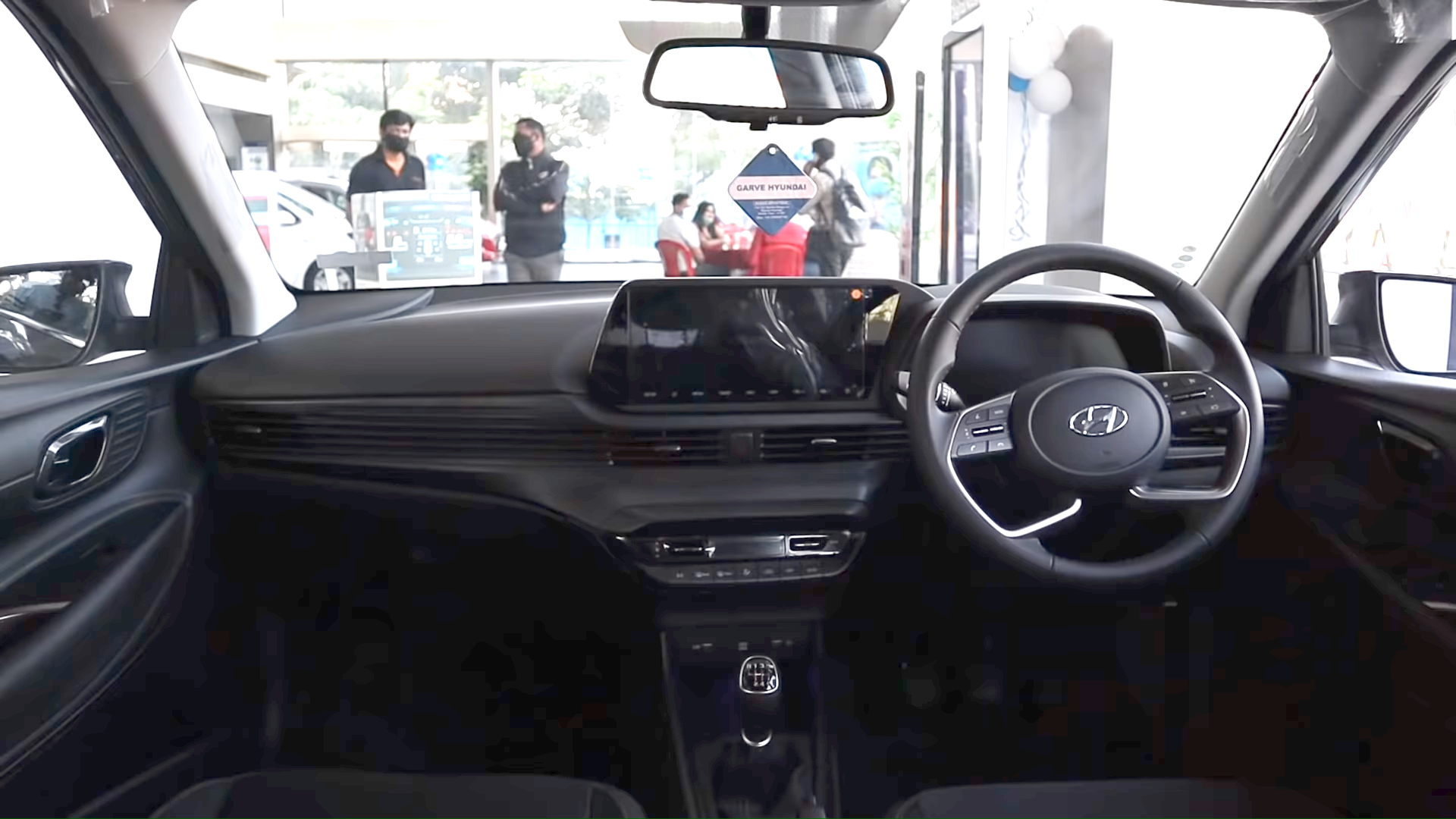
Pre-facelift i20 Asta (BI3; interior)

===== Facelift =====
The facelifted i20 was launched on 8 September 2023. The facelifted i20 N Line was also launched on 22 September 2023.

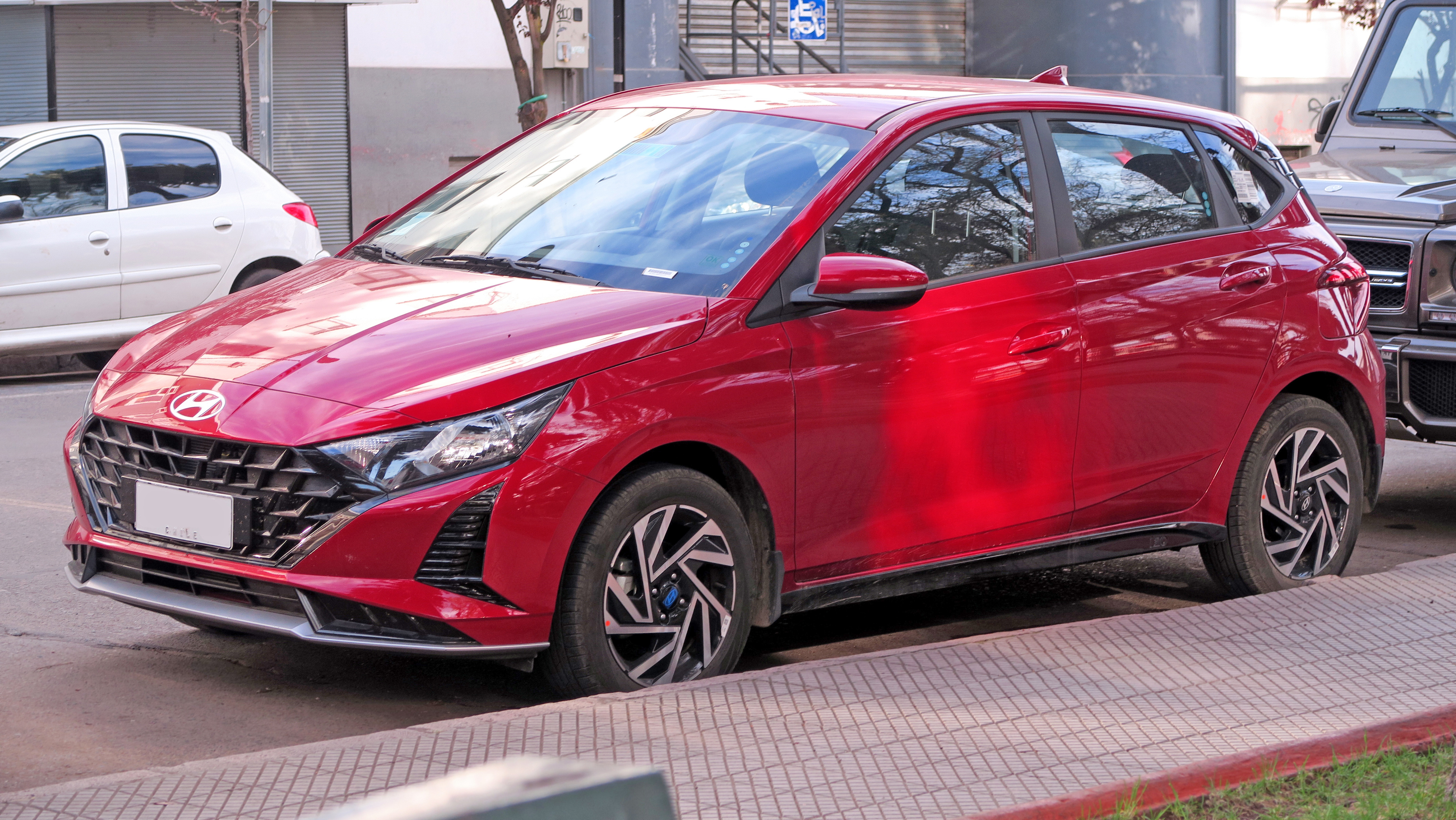
Facelift i20 Plus (BI3)

=== i20 N ===
A performance version called the i20 N was revealed for the European market in October 2020. It slots under the i30 N in the Hyundai N family.

The i20 N is powered by a 1.6-liter turbocharged GDi engine mated to a 6-speed manual transmission with automatic rev matching. This engine has 201 hp (204 PS; 150 kW) and 275 N⋅m (28.0 kg⋅m; 203 lb⋅ft) of torque. As the i20 N only weighs 1,190 kg (2,620 lb), it is able to accelerate from 0–100 km/h (0–62 mph) in a 6.2 seconds with a top speed of 230 km/h (143 mph).

Its engine delivers peak torque between 1,750 and 4,500 rpm and hits peak power between 5,500 and 6,000 rpm. The broad power band helps its acceleration performance throughout the mid and high-speed range. Although the Smartstream engine is featured in other Hyundai models, for the i20 N it is equipped with a bespoke turbocharger and intercooler system.

Changes also include a mechanical limited-slip differential, a reinforced chassis at 12 different points, and a reinforced front domes and knuckles with distinct geometry for the torsion beam suspension. The camber has also been increased while a new sway bar, new springs, and new shock absorbers have been fitted. The brakes have also been enlarged, being 40mm larger than the base i20 brakes.

Production of the i20 N has ceased for the European market starting from February 2024, and Hyundai N will only offer electric models in the region. Despite its discontinuation in Europe, the facelifted model of the i20 N is still being sold in the Australian market.

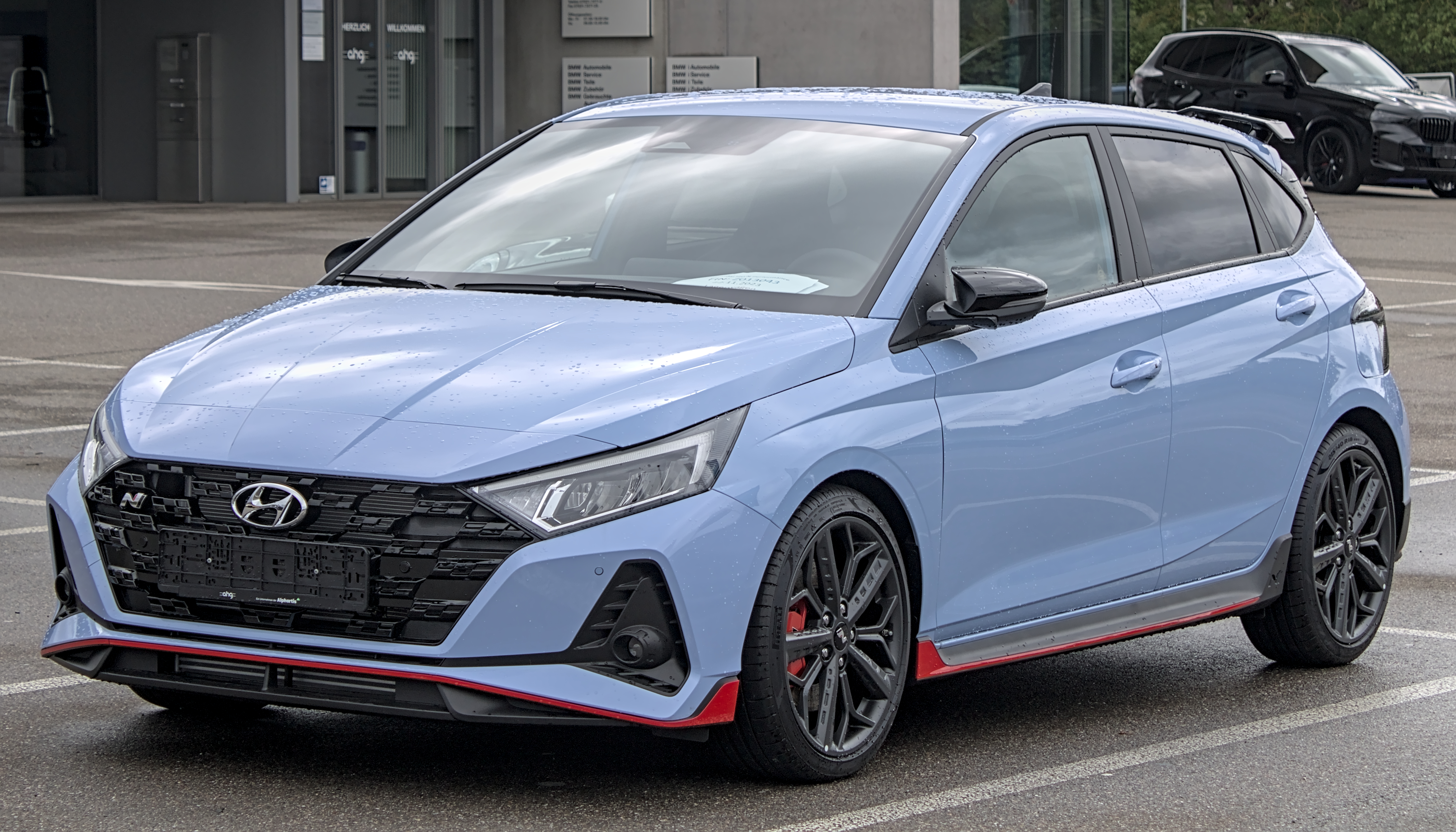
Hyundai i20 N

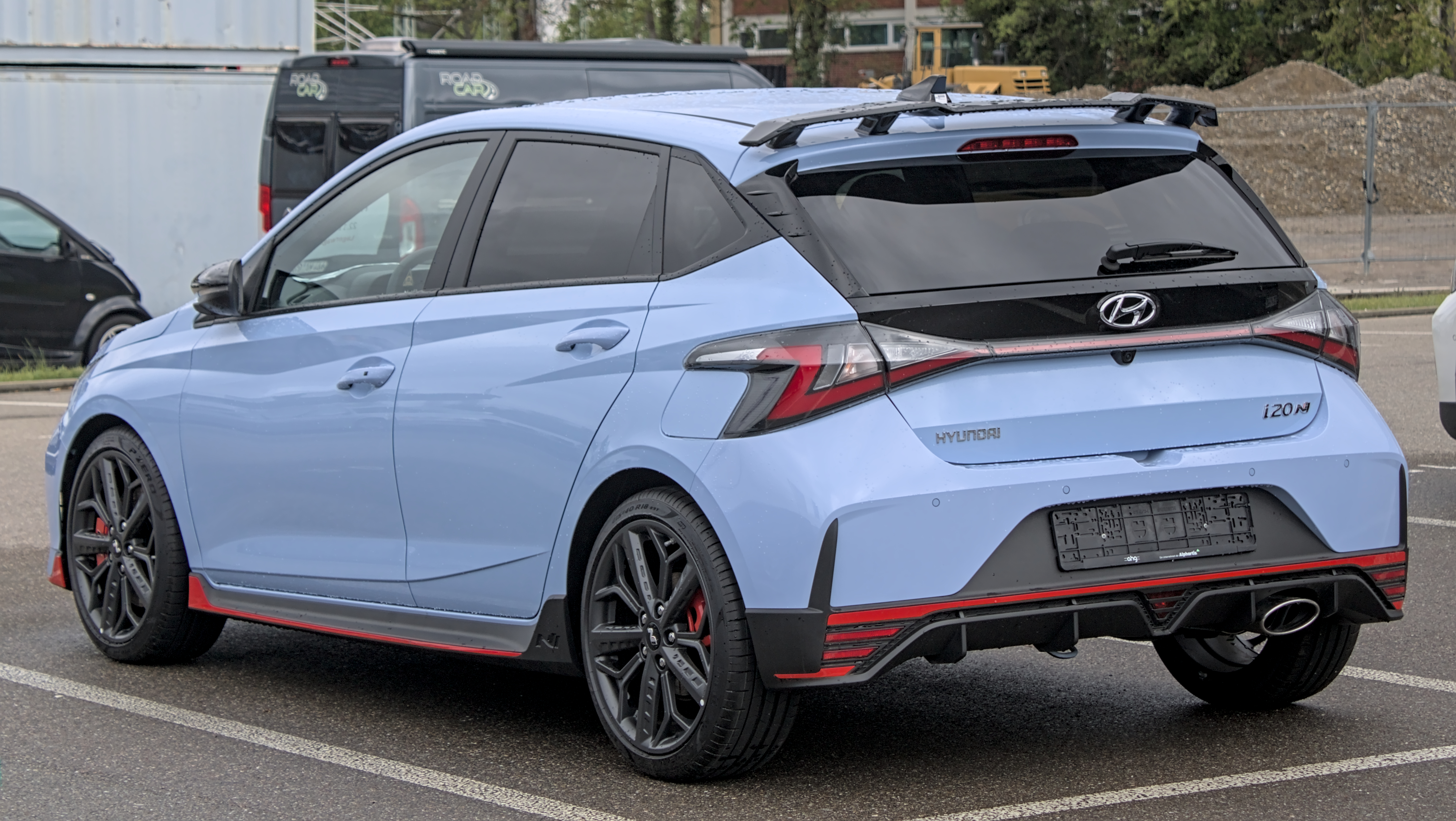
Rear view

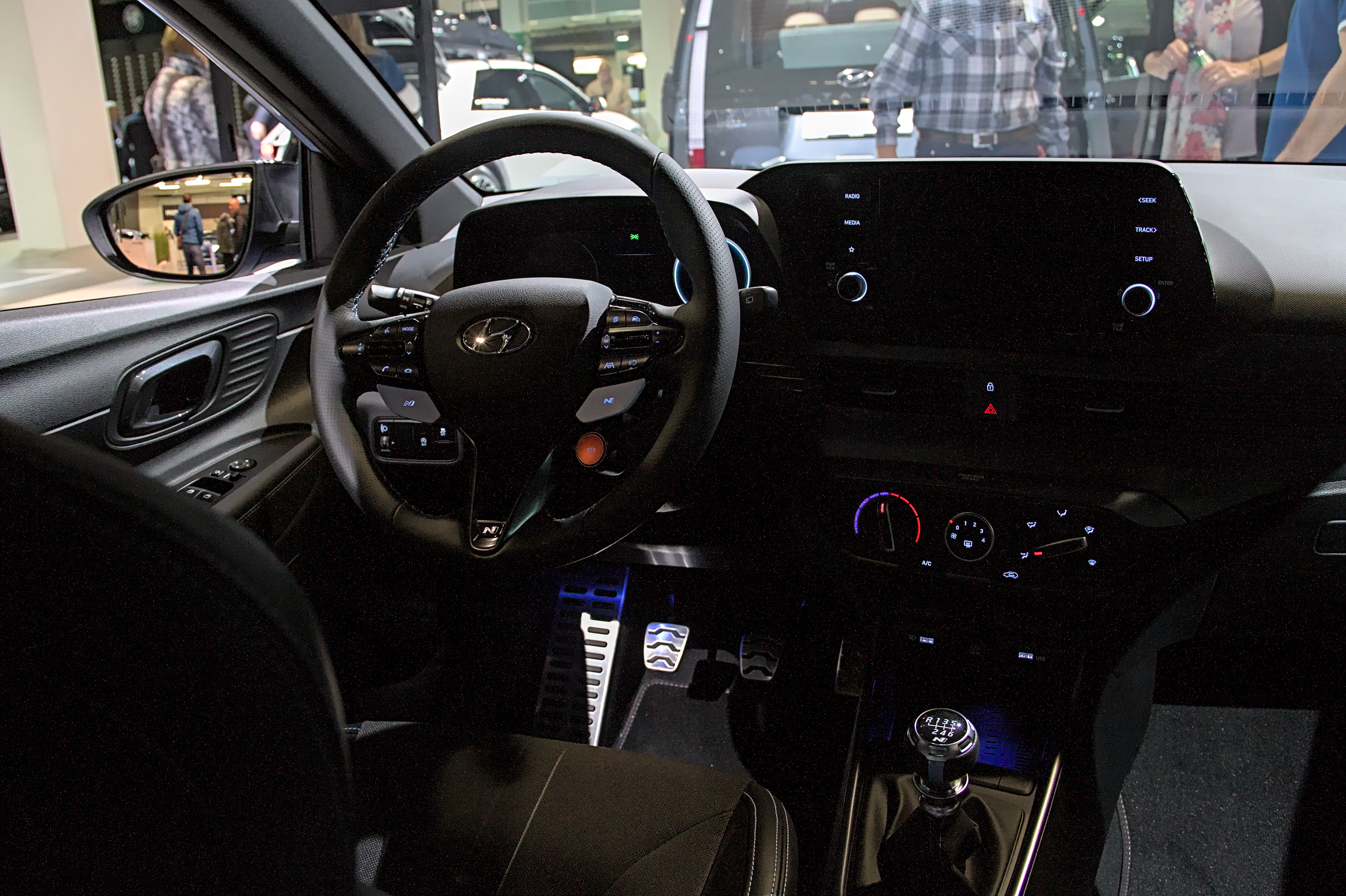
Interior

=== Powertrain ===
==== BC3 models ====
| Model | Year | Transmission | Power | Torque | 0–100 km/h (0-62 mph) (official) | Top speed |
i20
| 1.0 L Smartstream G1.0 T-GDi | 2020–present | 6-speed manual | 100 PS (74 kW; 99 hp) @ 4,500–6,000 rpm | 17.5 kg⋅m (172 N⋅m; 127 lbf⋅ft) @ 1,500–4,000 rpm | 10.4 s | 190 km/h (118 mph) |
| 1.0 L Smartstream G1.0 T-GDi | 2020–present | 7-speed DCT | 100 PS (74 kW; 99 hp) @ 4,500–6,000 rpm | 17.5 kg⋅m (172 N⋅m; 127 lbf⋅ft) @ 1,500–4,000 rpm | 11.4 s | 182 km/h (113 mph) |
| 1.0 L Smartstream G1.0 T-GDi | 2020–present | 6-speed manual | 120 PS (88 kW; 118 hp) @ 6,000 rpm | 17.5 kg⋅m (172 N⋅m; 127 lbf⋅ft) @ 1,500–4,000 rpm | 10.1 s | 190 km/h (118 mph) |
| 1.0 L Smartstream G1.0 T-GDi | 2020–present | 7-speed DCT | 120 PS (88 kW; 118 hp) @ 6,000 rpm | 20.4 kg⋅m (200 N⋅m; 148 lbf⋅ft) @ 2,000–3,000 rpm | 10.3 s | 190 km/h (118 mph) |
| 1.2 L Smartstream G1.2 MPi | 2020–present | 5-speed manual | 84 PS (62 kW; 83 hp) @ 6,000 rpm | 12.4 kg⋅m (122 N⋅m; 90 lbf⋅ft) @ 4,000 rpm | 13.1 s | 173 km/h (107 mph) |
| 1.4 L Kappa II MPi | 2020–present | 6-speed manual | 100 PS (74 kW; 99 hp) @ 6,000 rpm | 13.7 kg⋅m (134 N⋅m; 99 lbf⋅ft) @ 3,500 rpm | 12.6 s | 176 km/h (109 mph) |
| 1.4 L Kappa II MPi | 2020–present | 6-speed automatic | 100 PS (74 kW; 99 hp) @ 6,000 rpm | 13.7 kg⋅m (134 N⋅m; 99 lbf⋅ft) @ 3,500 rpm | 13.1 s | 176 km/h (109 mph) |
i20 N
| 1.6 L Smartstream G1.6 T-GDi | 2020–present | 6-speed manual | 204 PS (150 kW; 201 hp) @ 5,500–6,000 rpm | 28 kg⋅m (275 N⋅m; 203 lbf⋅ft) @ 1,750–4,500 rpm | 6.2 s | 230 km/h (143 mph) |

==== BI3 models ====
| Model | Year | Transmission | Power | Torque |
Petrol engines
| 1.0 L Kappa II T-GDi | 2020–present | 6-speed clutchless manual 7-speed DCT | 120 PS (88 kW; 118 hp) @ 6,000 rpm | 17.5 kg⋅m (172 N⋅m; 127 lbf⋅ft) @ 1,500–4,000 rpm |
| 1.2 L Kappa II MPi | 2020–present | 5-speed manual | 83 PS (61 kW; 82 hp) @ 6,000 rpm | 11.7 kg⋅m (115 N⋅m; 85 lbf⋅ft) @ 4,200 rpm |
| 1.2 L Kappa II MPi | 2020–present | CVT | 88 PS (65 kW; 87 hp) @ 6,000 rpm | 11.7 kg⋅m (115 N⋅m; 85 lbf⋅ft) @ 4,200 rpm |
| 1.4 L Kappa II MPi | 2020–present | 6-speed manual 6-speed automatic | 100 PS (74 kW; 99 hp) @ 6,000 rpm | 13.6 kg⋅m (133 N⋅m; 98 lbf⋅ft) @ 4,000 rpm |
Diesel engine
| 1.5 L U II CRDi | 2020–present | 6-speed manual | 100 PS (74 kW; 99 hp) @ 4,000 rpm | 24.5 kg⋅m (240 N⋅m; 177 lbf⋅ft) @ 1,500–2,750 rpm |

=== Safety ===
==== Global NCAP ====
===== India =====
The i20 is sold in India with two frontal airbags, antilock brakes, front seatbelt reminders and ISOFIX anchorages standard across the range. Electronic stability control, a tyre pressure monitor, front-seat side thorax airbags and head-protecting curtain airbags are optional on the regular i20 and standard on the i20 N.

The i20 was tested by Global NCAP 1.0 (similar to Latin NCAP 2013) in the first half of 2022. In the frontal offset crash test into a deformable barrier at 64 km/h, dummy readings showed only adequate protection of the driver's head. The i20 was penalised for unstable structural performance of the passenger compartment and rupture of the driver's footwell, both of which indicate poor integrity of the recorded structural performance. Dummy readings of moderate chest compression and the unstable passenger compartment led to chest protection being rated weak, consequently the i20 could not score points for seatbelt reminders. Structures behind the dashboard could increase risk of knee injury to differently sized or positioned occupants; the unstable passenger compartment and ruptured footwell meant Hyundai were not allowed to demonstrate otherwise. Using the child seats recommended by Hyundai, dynamic performance of the 3 year-old and 18 month-old child occupants was good, but readings of excessive neck tension inW A

The i20 in its standard European market configuration received 4 stars from Euro NCAP in 2021, with test results inherited from the Bayon.

== Fourth generation (BC4; 2026) ==
Fourth generation

Overview
- Model code: BC4
- Production: June 2026 – present
- Assembly: Brazil: Piracicaba (HMB)

Body and chassis
- Body style: 5-door hatchback
- Platform: Hyundai-Kia K3
- Related: Hyundai Bayon (BC4)

Powertrain
- Engine: Petrol flex fuel: 1.0 L Kappa I3; 1.0 L Kappa GDi turbo I3
- Transmission: 5-speed manual 6-speed automatic

Dimensions
- Wheelbase: 2,580 mm (101.6 in)
- Length: 4,130 mm (162.6 in)
- Width: 1,780 mm (70.1 in)
- Height: 1,495 mm (58.9 in)

Chronology
- Predecessor: Hyundai HB20X (Brazil)

The fourth-generation i20 was unveiled in Brazil on 12 June 2026, available in five trim levels; Comfort, Limited, X Line, Platinum and Ultimate.

Rear view

== Sales ==
| Year | Europe (Note: Europe: 2020 EU 27 + UK + Switzerland + Norway + Iceland) | Turkey | India | South Africa |
|---|---|---|---|---|
| 2008 | 785 | | 197 | |
| 2009 | 58,416 | | 31,122 | |
| 2010 | 68,087 | | 71,849 | |
| 2011 | 80,917 | | 80,571 | |
| 2012 | 75,343 | | 85,299 | |
| 2013 | 82,139 | | 71,788 | |
| 2014 | 83,903 | | 69,116 | 10,462 |
| 2015 | 91,758 | | 130,085 | 11,700 |
| 2016 | 98,956 | | 122,489 | 7,652 |
| 2017 | 100,571 | | 134,103 | 5,971 |
| 2018 | 91,272 | | 141,104 | 5,831 |
| 2019 | 84,218 | | 123,201 | 6,993 |
| 2020 | 63,301 | | 73,414 | 5,277 |
| 2021 | 61,662 | 16,321 | 72,292 | 4,451 |
| 2022 | 45,642 | 14,896 | 75,572 | 3,843 |
| 2023 | 53,712 | 20,919 | 76,687 | 5,413 |
| 2024 | 56,718 | 21,645 | | |

== Motorsport ==
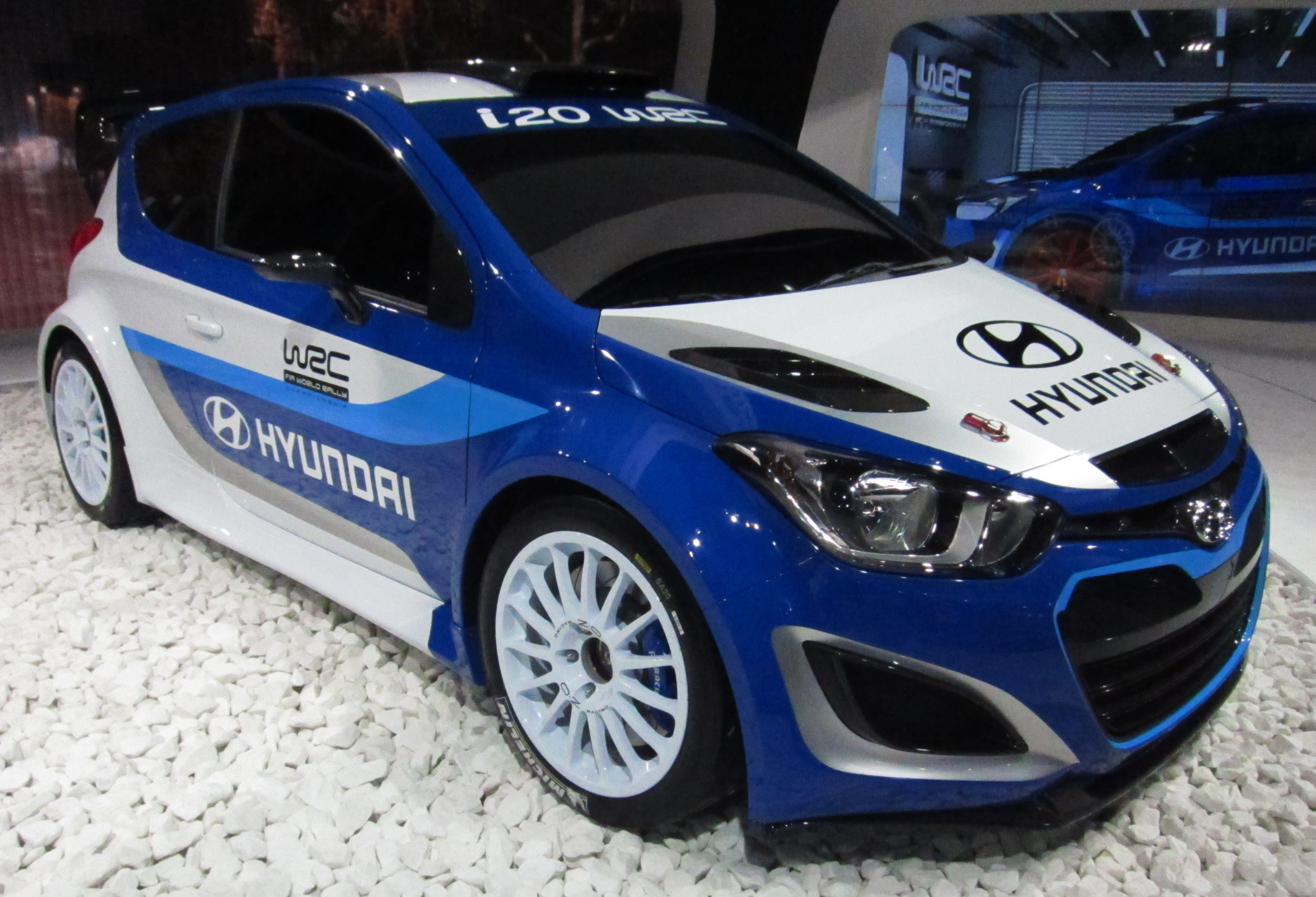
Hyundai i20 WRC

The original Hyundai i20 WRC is a World Rally Car built by Hyundai for use in the 2014 World Rally Championship. It is based on the i20, and was unveiled at the 2012 Paris Motor Show, marking Hyundai's return to the WRC after a ten-year absence. The car was operated by Hyundai's performance division, Hyundai Motorsport from a base in Frankfurt, Germany.

The i20 WRC made its debut at the Monte Carlo Rally in January 2014.

From 2017 to 2022, the Hyundai i20 Coupe WRC was used in the World Rally Championship.

Hyundai i20 R5 and Hyundai i20 N Rally2 are used in World Rally Championship-2 competitions.

Two cars were entered into 2018 FIA World Rallycross Championship, with Niclas Grönholm finishing 7th overall. Four cars were entered in 2019, with Timur Timerzyanov winning in Belgium.

Hyundai won the manufacturers' title in the 2019 World Rally Championship with the i20 Coupe WRC built by Hyundai Shell Mobis WRT.

Beginning with the 2022 season, the i20 Coupe WRC was replaced with the i20 N Rally1, with Thierry Neuville and Martijn Wydaeghe winning the 2024 World Rally Championship aboard one.

== See also ==
- List of Hyundai vehicles
