= Sebastian Eriksson (racing driver) =

Swedish rallycross driver

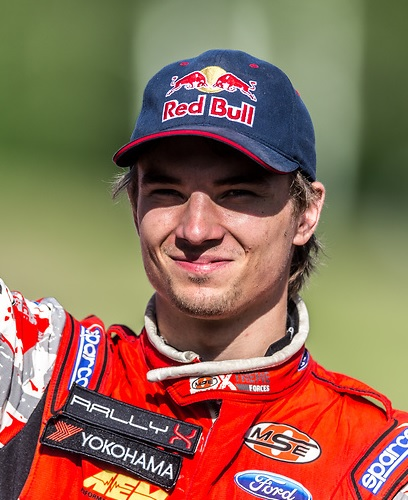
- Eriksson in June 2015
- Nationality: Swedish
- Born: 5 January 1993 (age 33) Hagfors, Sweden

FIA World Rallycross Championship career
- Debut season: 2014
- Current team: Olsbergs MSE
- Years active: 2014, 2017, 2019
- Car number: 93
- Starts: 6
- Wins: 1
- Podiums: 1
- Best finish: 17th in 2019
- Finished last season: 18th

RX Lites Cup
- Years active: 2014
- Car number: 11
- Former teams: Olsbergs MSE
- Starts: 3
- Wins: 2
- Podiums: 2
- Best finish: 5th in 2014
- Finished last season: 5th

Global Rallycross
- Years active: 2015–2017
- Car number: 93
- Former teams: Olsbergs MSE
- Starts: 35
- Wins: 2
- Podiums: 11
- Best finish: 2nd in 2015
- Finished last season: 4th

GRC Lites
- Years active: 2013
- Car number: 37
- Former teams: Olsbergs MSE
- Starts: 6
- Wins: 0
- Podiums: 5
- Best finish: 2nd in 2013
- Finished last season: 2nd

Stefan Sebastian Eriksson (born 5 January 1993) is a Swedish rallycross driver. He is a former participant in the Global Rallycross Championship, and currently competes in the FIA World Rallycross Championship. Throughout his entire professional racing career, he has raced exclusively for Olsbergs MSE.

Eriksson participated in the Light prototype class of the 2022 Dakar Rally in a team with Dutch co-driver Wouter Rosegaar. They finished in second place in their class.

Eriksson has no relation with Olsbergs MSE team owner Andréas Eriksson or drivers Kevin Eriksson and Oliver Eriksson.

== Racing record ==
=== Complete FIA World Rallycross Championship results ===
(key)

==== Supercar ====
Year	Entrant	Car	1	2	3	4	5	6	7	8	9	10	11	12	WRX	Points
2014	Olsbergs MSE	Ford Fiesta ST	POR	GBR	NOR	FIN	SWE; 6	BEL	CAN	FRA	GER	ITA	TUR	ARG	22nd	20
2017	Olsbergs MSE	Ford Fiesta ST	BAR	POR	HOC	BEL	GBR	NOR	SWE; 12	CAN	FRA	LAT	GER; 13	RSA	18th	12
2019	Olsbergs MSE	Ford Fiesta ST MK8	UAE	ESP	BEL	GBR	NOR	SWE; 1	CAN	FRA	LAT	RSA			17th	29
2020	Olsbergs MSE	Honda Civic Coupe	SWE; 10	SWE; 15	FIN	FIN	LAT	LAT	ESP	ESP					18th	12

==== RX Lites Cup ====
Year	Entrant	Car	1	2	3	4	5	6	Lites	Points
2014	Olsbergs MSE	Lites Ford Fiesta	POR; 1	GBR; 5	FIN	SWE	ITA	TUR; 1	5th	82

=== Complete Global RallyCross Championship results ===
(key)

==== GRC Lites ====
Year	Entrant	Car	1	2	3	4	5	6	GRC	Points
2013	Olsbergs MSE	Lites Ford Fiesta	LOU; 2	BRI; 5	IRW; 3	ATL; 3	CHA; 3	LV; 3	2nd	93

==== Supercar ====
Year	Entrant	Car	1	2	3	4	5	6	7	8	9	10	11	12	GRC	Points
2015	Olsbergs MSE	Ford Fiesta ST	FTA; 4	DAY1; 3	DAY2; 1	MCAS; 9	DET1; 3	DET2; 3	DC; 6	LA1; 13	LA2; 7	BAR1; 4	BAR2; 7	LV; 2	2nd	400
2016	Honda Red Bull OMSE	Honda Civic Coupe	PHO1; 9	PHO2; 3	DAL; 10	DAY1; 3	DAY2; 3	MCAS1; 6	MCAS2; C	DC; 10	AC; 6	SEA; 2	LA1; 9	LA2; 12	7th	341
2017	Honda Red Bull OMSE	Honda Civic Coupe	MEM; 7	LOU; 1	THO1; 10	THO2; 6	OTT1; 6	OTT1; 4	INDY; 6	AC1; 4	AC2; 2	SEA1; 10	SEA2; 9	LA; 7	4th	651
