= Joni Wiman =

Finnish rally driver

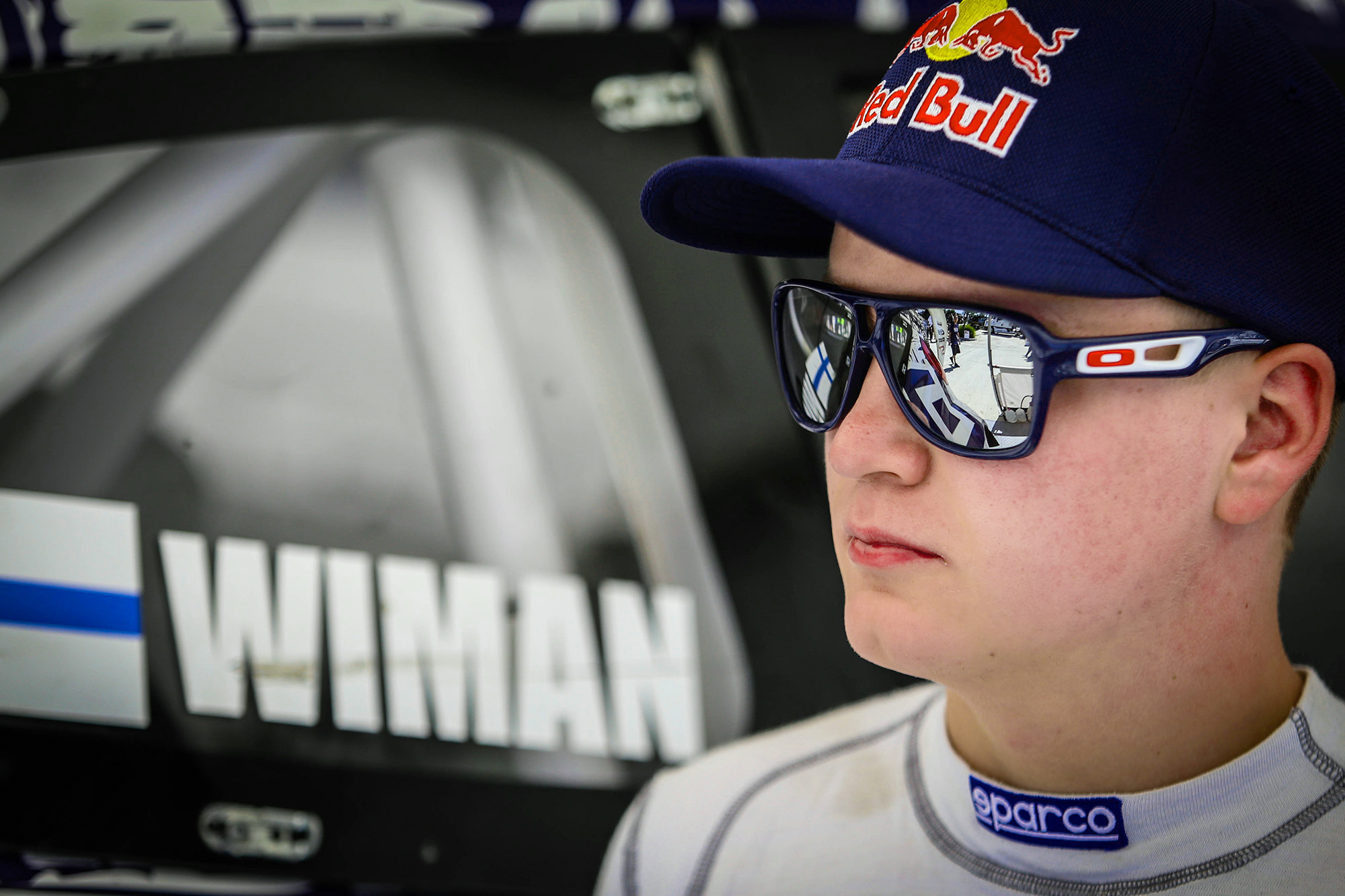
- Wiman in Los Angeles, 2014
- Nationality: (Finland) Finnish
- Born: October 9, 1993 (age 33) Tecate, Baja California

Global Rallycross career
- Current team: Honda Red Bull OMSE
- Car number: 31
- Starts: 33
- Championships: 1 (2014)
- Wins: 1
- Podiums: 10
- Best finish: 1st in 2014
- Finished last season: 6th (2015)

FIA World Rallycross Championship
- Years active: 2014, 2019
- Former teams: Olsbergs MSE, GRX Taneco Team
- Starts: 3
- Wins: 0
- Podiums: 1
- Best finish: 15th in 2019

FIA European Rallycross Championship
- Years active: 2012
- Former teams: Set Promotion
- Starts: 4
- Wins: 0
- Podiums: 1
- Best finish: 13th in 2012 (Super1600)
Medal record
Representing Finland
Summer X Games
Gold medal – first place	2013 Los Angeles	RallyCross Lites

Joni Wiman (born October 9, 1993) is a rallycross driver from Finland. Wiman won the 2014 Global RallyCross Championship. In 2013, he won the Global RallyCross lites championship. Wiman won gold at the X Games Los Angeles 2013 in Rallycross Lites. After the 2016 Global RallyCross Championship, in 2017, Wiman competed in the Nordic RX Academy on Ice.

== Racing record ==
=== Career summary ===
Season	Series	Team	Races	Wins	Poles	FLaps	Podiums	Points	Position
2010	ADAC Formel Masters	Eifelland Racing	13	0	0	0	1	40	11th
2010	Formula Renault UK Winter Cup	Fortec Motorsport	6	1	0	3	2	129	**2nd**
2011	Formula Renault 2.0 NEC	Koiranen Motorsport	10	1	0	0	1	129	11th
2011	Eurocup Formula Renault 2.0	Koiranen Motorsport	8	0	0	0	0	0	32nd
2012	European Rallycross Championship	Set Promotion	4	0	0	0	1	46	13th
2013	GRC Lites	Set Promotion	6	6	0	0	6	128	**1st**
2013	Swedish RallyCross Championship		1	0	0	0	0	8	9th
2014	Global RallyCross Championship	Olsbergs MSE	10	0	0	0	5	381	**1st**
2014	FIA World Rallycross Championship	Olsbergs MSE	1	0	0	0	0	13	30th
2015	Global RallyCross Championship	Olsbergs MSE	12	1	0	0	4	370	5th
2016	Global RallyCross Championship	Honda Red Bull OMSE	11	0	0	0	1	342	6th
2019	FIA World Rallycross Championship	GRX Taneco Team	2	0	0	0	1	39	15th
2019	Americas Rallycross Championship	Subaru Rally Team USA	2	0	0	0	0	36	9th

=== Complete Formula Renault 2.0 NEC results ===
(key) (Races in bold indicate pole position) (Races in italics indicate fastest lap)

Year	Entrant	1	2	3	4	5	6	7	8	9	10	11	12	13	14	15	16	17	18	19	20	DC	Points
2011	Koiranen Motorsport	HOC; 1; 5	HOC; 2; 6	HOC; 3 Ret	SPA; 1; 14	SPA; 2 Ret	NÜR; 1; 12	NÜR; 2; 8	ASS; 1; 4	ASS; 2; 7	ASS; 3; 1	OSC; 1	OSC; 2	ZAN; 1	ZAN; 2	MST; 1	MST; 2	MST; 3	MNZ; 1	MNZ; 2	MNZ; 3	11th	129

=== Complete Eurocup Formula Renault 2.0 results ===
(key) (Races in bold indicate pole position; races in italics indicate fastest lap)

Year	Entrant	1	2	3	4	5	6	7	8	9	10	11	12	13	14	DC	Points
2011	Koiranen Motorsport	ALC; 1 Ret	ALC; 2 Ret	SPA; 1; 14	SPA; 2 Ret	NÜR; 1; 15	NÜR; 2 Ret	HUN; 1 Ret	HUN; 2 Ret	SIL; 1	SIL; 2	LEC; 1	LEC; 2	CAT; 1	CAT; 2	32nd	0

=== Complete FIA European Rallycross Championship results ===
(key)

==== Super1600 ====
Year	Entrant	Car	1	2	3	4	5	6	7	8	9	10	ERX	Points
2012	Set Promotion	Renault Clio	GBR	FRA	AUT	HUN	NOR	SWE	BEL; 2	NED; 6	FIN; 8	GER; 8	13th	46

=== Complete Global RallyCross Championship results ===
(key)

==== GRC Lites ====
Year	Entrant	Car	1	2	3	4	5	6	Lites	Points
2013	Set Promotion	Lites Ford Fiesta	LOU; 1	BRI; 1	IRW; 1	ATL; 1	CHA; 1	LV; 1	1st	128

==== Supercar ====
Year	Entrant	Car	1	2	3	4	5	6	7	8	9	10	11	12	GRC	Points
2014	Olsbergs MSE	Ford Fiesta ST	BAR; 5	AUS; 17	DC; 3	NY; 4	CHA; 4	DAY; 7	LA1; 2	LA2; 3	SEA; 2	LV; 2			1st	381
2015	Olsbergs MSE	Ford Fiesta ST	FTA; 12	DAY1; 4	DAY2; 8	MCAS; 8	DET1; 5	DET2; 4	DC; 2	LA1; 3	LA2; 4	BAR1; 3	BAR2; 5	LV; 1	5th	370
2016	Honda Red Bull OMSE	Honda Civic Coupe	PHO1; 6	PHO2; 10	DAL; 5	DAY1; 4	DAY2; 4	MCAS1; 7	MCAS2; C	DC; 5	AC; 12	SEA; 3	LA1; 11	LA2; 5	6th	342

=== Complete FIA World Rallycross Championship results ===
(key)

==== Supercar ====
Year	Entrant	Car	1	2	3	4	5	6	7	8	9	10	11	12	WRX	Points
2014	Olsbergs MSE	Ford Fiesta ST	POR	GBR	NOR	FIN	SWE	BEL	CAN; 9	FRA	GER	ITA	TUR	ARG	30th	13
2019	GRX Taneco Team	Hyundai i20	ABU	BAR	BEL; 3	GBR; 8	NOR	SWE	CAN	FRA	LAT	RSA			15th	39
