= Oliver Bennett =

British rallycross driver (born 1992)

- Nationality: (United Kingdom) British
- Born: 7 November 1992 (age 34) Bristol, United Kingdom

FIA World Rallycross Championship career
- Debut season: 2017
- Current team: XITE Racing
- Car number: 42
- Starts: 23
- Wins: 0
- Podiums: 0

British Rallycross Championship
- Years active: 2016–2017
- Car number: 42
- Best finish: 3rd in 2017 (Supercar)

Oliver Roy Bennett (born 7 November 1992) is a rallycross driver from Bristol, United Kingdom. He is the co-founder of the Xite Energy drink company, and competes in the FIA World Rallycross Championship and Extreme E for the Xite Energy Racing team.

== Early career ==
Bennett started his racing career competing in motocross from the age of eight, through to 18 when he competed in the European MX championship.

An accident left Barrett unable to continue competition on two wheels so he made the move to four wheels competing in Rallycross.

== Rallycross ==
In 2016, Bennett made his debut in British Rallycross Championship racing an ex-OSME Ford Fiesta.

In 2017, Bennett finished on the podium seven out of nine races and despite scoring the most points that season, he narrowly miss out on the overall title due to dropped point scores; he also got his first taste of World Rallycross action at Lydden Hill in a one-off race.

Towards the end of the 2017 season, Bennett's team XITE Racing built a rallycross spec BMW MINI Cooper Supercar to compete in the FIA World Rallycross Championship, debuting it in the first round of the British Rallycross season at Silverstone.

Bennett's 2018 World RX season started at the first round in Barcelona where he finished with a 15th position in a tough line up and wet conditions.

The team continued their development of the car throughout the year, before Bennett made his Americas Rallycross debut, narrowly missing on semi-finals in his three appearances.

Following the end of the 2018 World RX season, Bennett made his Gymkhana GRiD debut in Cape Town, South Africa.

In 2019, Bennett would enter the FIA World Rallycross Championship once again, backed by XITE Energy and automotive social media site Drive Tribe.

== Dirt Rally 2.0 ==
Bennett's Ford Fiesta rallycross car along with the XITE Racing Mini SX1 is available as a playable car in the Dirt Rally 2.0 game from Codemasters.

== Racing record ==
=== Complete FIA World Rallycross Championship results ===
==== Supercar/RX1 ====
Year	Entrant	Car	1	2	3	4	5	6	7	8	9	10	11	12	WRX	Points
2017	Oliver Bennett	Ford Fiesta	BAR	POR	HOC	BEL	GBR; 23	NOR	SWE	CAN	FRA	LAT	GER	RSA	39th	0
2018	Oliver Bennett	BMW MINI Cooper	BAR; 15	POR; 16	BEL	GBR; 21	NOR; 20	SWE; 15	CAN	FRA; 18	LAT; 20	USA	GER; 15	RSA; 18^{a}	39th	-3
2019	Xite Racing	Mini Cooper	ABU; 17	BAR; 17	BEL; 14	GBR; 12	NOR; 14	SWE; 22	CAN; 15	FRA; 19	LAT; 16	RSA; 12			20th	12^{b}
2020	Oliver Bennett	Mini Cooper SX1	SWE	SWE	FIN	FIN	LAT	LAT	BAR; 11	BAR; 14					21st	11
2021	Oliver Bennett	Mini Cooper	BAR; 12	SWE	FRA	LAT	LAT	BEL	PRT	GER	GER				22nd	8

^{a} Loss of 10 championship points – stewards' decision

^{b} Loss of 10 championship points – stewards' decision

=== Complete Extreme E results ===
(key)

Year	Team	Car	1	2	3	4	5	6	7	8	9	10	Pos.	Points
2021	Hispano-Suiza Xite Energy Team	Spark ODYSSEY 21	DES; Q 5	DES; R 5									9th	55
2021	Xite Energy Racing	Spark ODYSSEY 21			OCE; Q 6	OCE; R 6	ARC; Q 9	ARC; R 8	ISL; Q 9	ISL; R 9	JUR; Q 9	JUR; R 9	9th	55
2022	Xite Energy Racing	Spark ODYSSEY 21	DES; 6	ISL1	ISL2	COP	ENE						15th	8
