= 2018 World RX of South Africa =

Rallycross championship event

- Round 12 of 12 in the 2018 FIA World Rallycross Championship
- Date: 24-25 November 2018
- Location: Cape Town, South Africa
- Venue: Killarney Motor Racing Complex

Results
Heat winners
- Heat 1: (France) Sébastien Loeb; Team Peugeot Total
- Heat 2: Johan Kristoffersson; PSRX Volkswagen Sweden
- Heat 3: Johan Kristoffersson; PSRX Volkswagen Sweden
- Heat 4: Johan Kristoffersson; PSRX Volkswagen Sweden
Semi-final winners
- Semi-final 1: Johan Kristoffersson; PSRX Volkswagen Sweden
- Semi-final 2: (Norway) Petter Solberg; PSRX Volkswagen Sweden
Final
- First: Johan Kristoffersson; PSRX Volkswagen Sweden
- Second: (Sweden) Mattias Ekström; EKS Audi Sport
- Third: (France) Sébastien Loeb; Team Peugeot Total

World RX layout of Killarney Motor Racing Complex

The 2018 World RX of South Africa was the twelfth and final round of the fifth season of the FIA World Rallycross Championship. The event was held at the Killarney Motor Racing Complex in Cape Town, Western Cape.

== Supercar ==
=== Heats ===
Pos.	No.	Driver	Team	Car	Q1	Q2	Q3	Q4	Pts
1	1	(Sweden) Johan Kristoffersson	PSRX Volkswagen Sweden	Volkswagen Polo	16th	1st	1st	1st	16
2	9	(France) Sébastien Loeb	Team Peugeot Total	Peugeot 208	1st	6th	2nd	2nd	15
3	21	(Sweden) Timmy Hansen	Team Peugeot Total	Peugeot 208	2nd	4th	3rd	4th	14
4	11	(Norway) Petter Solberg	PSRX Volkswagen Sweden	Volkswagen Polo	4th	2nd	4th	5th	13
5	13	(Norway) Andreas Bakkerud	EKS Audi Sport	Audi S1	3rd	5th	6th	3rd	12
6	5	(Sweden) Mattias Ekström	EKS Audi Sport	Audi S1	6th	3rd	5th	7th	11
7	71	(Sweden) Kevin Hansen	Team Peugeot Total	Peugeot 208	7th	8th	7th	6th	10
8	92	(Sweden) Anton Marklund	GC Kompetition	Renault Mégane RS	10th	7th	9th	13th	9
9	6	(Latvia) Janis Baumanis	Team Stard	Ford Fiesta	5th	11th	17th	8th	8
10	44	(Germany) Timo Scheider	ALL-INKL.COM Münnich Motorsport	Seat Ibiza	15th	10th	10th	9th	7
11	7	(Russia) Timur Timerzyanov	GRX Taneco Team	Hyundai i20	9th	16th	8th	11th	6
12	36	(France) Guerlain Chicherit	GC Kompetition	Renault Mégane RS	14th	9th	12th	10th	5
13	68	(Finland) Niclas Grönholm	GRX Taneco Team	Hyundai i20	8th	14th	14th	12th	4
14	96	(Sweden) Kevin Eriksson	Olsbergs MSE	Ford Fiesta	11th	12th	11th	14th	3
15	4	(Sweden) Robin Larsson	Olsbergs MSE	Ford Fiesta	12th	13th	13th	15th	2
16	77	(Germany) René Münnich	ALL-INKL.COM Münnich Motorsport	Seat Ibiza	17th	15th	16th	16th	1
17	66	(Belgium) Gregoire Demoustier	Sébastien Loeb Racing	Peugeot 208	13th	DNS	15th	17th	
18	42	(United Kingdom) Oliver Bennett	Oliver Bennett	BMW Mini Cooper	18th	DNS	18th	DNS	

=== Semi-finals ===
Semi-Final 1

Pos.	No.	Driver	Team	Time	Pts
1	1	(Sweden) Johan Kristoffersson	PSRX Volkswagen Sweden	4:11.770	6
2	21	(Sweden) Timmy Hansen	Team Peugeot Total	+1.909	5
3	71	(Sweden) Kevin Hansen	Team Peugeot Total	+7.062	4
4	7	(Russia) Timur Timerzyanov	GRX Taneco Team	+9.078	3
5	6	(Latvia) Janis Baumanis	Team Stard	+19.417	2
6	13	(Norway) Andreas Bakkerud	EKS Audi Sport	DNF	1

Semi-Final 2

Pos.	No.	Driver	Team	Time	Pts
1	11	(Norway) Petter Solberg	PSRX Volkswagen Sweden	4:09.838	6
2	9	(France) Sébastien Loeb	Team Peugeot Total	+1.939	5
3	5	(Sweden) Mattias Ekström	EKS Audi Sport	+3.025	4
4	92	(Sweden) Anton Marklund	GC Kompetition	+17.783	3
5	44	(Germany) Timo Scheider	ALL-INKL.COM Münnich Motorsport	+17.814	2
6	36	(France) Guerlain Chicherit	GC Kompetition	DNF	1

=== Final ===
Pos.	No.	Driver	Team	Time	Pts
1	1	(Sweden) Johan Kristoffersson	PSRX Volkswagen Sweden	4:12.787	8
2	5	(Sweden) Mattias Ekström	EKS Audi Sport	+2.700	5
3	9	(France) Sébastien Loeb	Team Peugeot Total	+3.595	4
4	71	(Sweden) Kevin Hansen	Team Peugeot Total	+6.230	3
5	11	(Norway) Petter Solberg	PSRX Volkswagen Sweden	DNF	2
6	21	(Sweden) Timmy Hansen	Team Peugeot Total	DNF	1

== Standings after the event ==
Pos.	Driver	Pts	Gap
WC	(Sweden) Johan Kristoffersson	341	
2	(Sweden) Mattias Ekström	248	+93
3	(Norway) Andreas Bakkerud	37	+104
4	(France) Sébastien Loeb	229	+112
5	(Norway) Petter Solberg	227	+114

- Note: Only the top five positions are included.

Previous race: 2018 World RX of Germany	FIA World Rallycross Championship; 2018 season	Next race: 2019 World RX of Abu Dhabi
Previous race: 2017 World RX of South Africa	World RX of South Africa	Next race: 2019 World RX of South Africa
