= World RX of South Africa =

Rallycross event

The World RX of South Africa was a Rallycross event held in South Africa for the FIA World Rallycross Championship. The event made its début in the 2017 season, at the Killarney Motor Racing Complex in Cape Town.

World RX layout of Killarney Motor Racing Complex

== Past winners ==
Year	Qualifying 1 winner	Qualifying 2 winner	Qualifying 3 winner	Qualifying 4 winner	Semi-Final 1 winner	Semi-Final 2 winner	Final winner
2017	(Sweden) Timmy Hansen	(Latvia) Jānis Baumanis	(Sweden) Johan Kristoffersson	(Sweden) Timmy Hansen	(Sweden) Johan Kristoffersson	(Sweden) Timmy Hansen	(Sweden) Johan Kristoffersson
2018	(France) Sébastien Loeb	(Sweden) Johan Kristoffersson	(Sweden) Johan Kristoffersson	(Sweden) Johan Kristoffersson	(Sweden) Johan Kristoffersson	(Norway) Petter Solberg	(Sweden) Johan Kristoffersson
2019	(Sweden) Timmy Hansen	(Finland) Niclas Grönholm	(Sweden) Timmy Hansen	(Finland) Niclas Grönholm	(Norway) Andreas Bakkerud	(Sweden) Timmy Hansen	(Finland) Niclas Grönholm
2020	Cancelled due to the COVID-19 pandemic						
2023	(Sweden) Johan Kristoffersson	(Germany) Timo Scheider	(Sweden) Timmy Hansen		(Sweden) Johan Kristoffersson	(Norway) Ole Christian Veiby	(Sweden) Johan Kristoffersson
2023	(Sweden) Johan Kristoffersson	(Germany) Timo Scheider	(Germany) Timo Scheider		(Germany) Timo Scheider	(Sweden) Johan Kristoffersson	(Germany) Timo Scheider
