= 2018 World RX of Latvia =

Rallycross series held in Latvia

- Round 9 of 12 in the 2018 FIA World Rallycross Championship
- Date: 14–16 September 2018
- Location: Riga, Latvia
- Venue: Biķernieku Kompleksā Sporta Bāze

Results
Heat winners
- Heat 1: Johan Kristoffersson; PSRX Volkswagen Sweden
- Heat 2: Johan Kristoffersson; PSRX Volkswagen Sweden
- Heat 3: (Sweden) Timmy Hansen; Team Peugeot Total
- Heat 4: Johan Kristoffersson; PSRX Volkswagen Sweden
Semi-final winners
- Semi-final 1: Johan Kristoffersson; PSRX Volkswagen Sweden
- Semi-final 2: (France) Sébastien Loeb; Team Peugeot Total
Final
- First: Johan Kristoffersson; PSRX Volkswagen Sweden
- Second: (Sweden) Mattias Ekström; EKS Audi Sport
- Third: (France) Sébastien Loeb; Team Peugeot Total

World RX layout of Biķernieku Kompleksā Sporta Bāze

The 2018 World RX of Latvia was the ninth round of the fifth season of the FIA World Rallycross Championship. The event was held at Biķernieku Kompleksā Sporta Bāze, in the Latvian capital of Riga.

== Supercar ==
=== Heats ===
Pos.	No.	Driver	Team	Car	Q1	Q2	Q3	Q4	Pts
1	1	(Sweden) Johan Kristoffersson	PSRX Volkswagen Sweden	Volkswagen Polo	1st	1st	3rd	1st	16
2	9	(France) Sébastien Loeb	Team Peugeot Total	Peugeot 208	2nd	11th	2nd	2nd	15
3	5	(Sweden) Mattias Ekström	EKS Audi Sport	Audi S1	3rd	2nd	4th	7th	14
4	21	(Sweden) Timmy Hansen	Team Peugeot Total	Peugeot 208	5th	18th	1st	3rd	13
5	11	(Norway) Petter Solberg	PSRX Volkswagen Sweden	Volkswagen Polo	4th	3rd	12th	4th	12
6	13	(Norway) Andreas Bakkerud	EKS Audi Sport	Audi S1	6th	4th	11th	9th	11
7	68	(Finland) Niclas Grönholm	GRX Taneco Team	Hyundai i20	8th	6th	10th	10th	10
8	51	(Switzerland) Nico Müller	EKS Audi Sport	Audi S1	7th	19th	5th	6th	9
9	36	(France) Guerlain Chicherit	GC Kompetition	Renault Mégane RS	9th	12th	7th	11th	8
10	71	(Sweden) Kevin Hansen	Team Peugeot Total	Peugeot 208	15th	17th	6th	5th	7
11	7	(Russia) Timur Timerzyanov	GRX Taneco Team	Hyundai i20	10th	9th	14th	12th	6
12	33	(United Kingdom) Liam Doran	GC Kompetition	Renault Mégane RS	13th	10th	17th	8th	5
13	44	(Germany) Timo Scheider	ALL-INKL.COM Münnich Motorsport	Seat Ibiza	18th	7th	8th	15th	4
14	6	(Latvia) Janis Baumanis	Team Stard	Ford Fiesta	12th	8th	15th	14th	3
15	57	(Finland) Toomas Heikkinen	MJP Racing Team Austria	Ford Fiesta	11th	5th	13th	20th	2
16	96	(Sweden) Kevin Eriksson	Olsbergs MSE	Ford Fiesta	20th	13th	9th	17th	1
17	42	(United Kingdom) Oliver Bennett	Oliver Bennett	BMW Mini Cooper	19th	16th	20th	19th	
18	66	(Belgium) Gregoire Demoustier	Sébastien Loeb Racing	Peugeot 208	14th	20th	16th	18th	
19	4	(Sweden) Robin Larsson	Olsbergs MSE	Ford Fiesta	17th	14th	19th	13th	
20	32	(Austria) Alexander Wurz	MJP Racing Team Austria	Ford Fiesta	16th	15th	18th	16th	

=== Semi-finals ===
Semi-Final 1

Pos.	No.	Driver	Team	Time	Pts
1	1	(Sweden) Johan Kristoffersson	PSRX Volkswagen Sweden	4:59.652	6
2	5	(Sweden) Mattias Ekström	EKS Audi Sport	+3.297	5
3	68	(Finland) Niclas Grönholm	GRX Taneco Team	+7.228	4
4	36	(France) Guerlain Chicherit	GC Kompetition	+9.736	3
5	11	(Norway) Petter Solberg	PSRX Volkswagen Sweden	+12.691	2
6	7	(Russia) Timur Timerzyanov	GRX Taneco Team	+1 lap	1

Semi-Final 2

Pos.	No.	Driver	Team	Time	Pts
1	9	(France) Sébastien Loeb	Team Peugeot Total	5:03.401	6
2	21	(Sweden) Timmy Hansen	Team Peugeot Total	+2.139	5
3	71	(Sweden) Kevin Hansen	Team Peugeot Total	+4.451	4
4	13	(Norway) Andreas Bakkerud	EKS Audi Sport	+6.436	3
5	33	(United Kingdom) Liam Doran	GC Kompetition	+11.336	2
6	51	(Switzerland) Nico Müller	EKS Audi Sport	DNF	1

=== Final ===
Pos.	No.	Driver	Team	Time	Pts
1	1	(Sweden) Johan Kristoffersson	PSRX Volkswagen Sweden	5:01.530	8
2	5	(Sweden) Mattias Ekström	EKS Audi Sport	+2.306	5
3	9	(France) Sébastien Loeb	Team Peugeot Total	+3.332	4
4	68	(Finland) Niclas Grönholm	GRX Taneco Team	+3.894	3
5	21	(Sweden) Timmy Hansen	Team Peugeot Total	+4.647	2
6	71	(Sweden) Kevin Hansen	Team Peugeot Total	+7.386	1

== Standings after the event ==
Pos.	Driver	Pts	Gap
1	(Sweden) Johan Kristoffersson	254	
2	(Sweden) Mattias Ekström	181	+73
3	(Norway) Andreas Bakkerud	179	+75
4	(France) Sébastien Loeb	176	+78
5	(Norway) Petter Solberg	175	+79

- Note: Only the top five positions are included.

Previous race: 2018 World RX of France	FIA World Rallycross Championship; 2018 season	Next race: 2018 World RX of USA
Previous race: 2017 World RX of Latvia	World RX of Latvia	Next race: 2019 World RX of Latvia
