= 2019 World RX of Great Britain =

Rallycross championship event

- Round 4 of 10 in the 2019 FIA World Rallycross Championship
- Date: 25-26 May 2019
- Location: Silverstone, Northamptonshire
- Venue: Silverstone Circuit

Results
Heat winners
- Heat 1: (Sweden) Timmy Hansen; Team Hansen MJP
- Heat 2: (Sweden) Timmy Hansen; Team Hansen MJP
- Heat 3: (Norway) Andreas Bakkerud; Monster Energy RX Cartel
- Heat 4: (Norway) Andreas Bakkerud; Monster Energy RX Cartel
Semi-final winners
- Semi-final 1: (Sweden) Timmy Hansen; Team Hansen MJP
- Semi-final 2: (Norway) Andreas Bakkerud; Monster Energy RX Cartel
Final
- First: (Sweden) Timmy Hansen; Team Hansen MJP
- Second: (Norway) Andreas Bakkerud; Monster Energy RX Cartel
- Third: (Sweden) Anton Marklund; GC Kompetition

World RX layout of Silverstone Circuit

The 2019 World RX of Great Britain was the fourth round of the sixth season of the FIA World Rallycross Championship. The event was held at Silverstone Circuit in Silverstone, Northamptonshire.

Niclas Gronholm had intended to race in the British event but longer than planned recovery from the appendicitis that forced him out of the previous round in Belgium mean he also misses this weekend. Compatriot Joni Wiman, who finished on the podium with the GRX team in Spa, replaced him again.

== Supercar ==
=== Heats ===
Pos.	No.	Driver	Team	Car	Q1	Q2	Q3	Q4	Pts
1	21	(Sweden) Timmy Hansen	Team Hansen MJP	Peugeot 208	1st	1st	2nd	4th	16
2	13	(Norway) Andreas Bakkerud	Monster Energy RX Cartel	Audi S1	3rd	7th	1st	1st	15
3	71	(Sweden) Kevin Hansen	Team Hansen MJP	Peugeot 208	2nd	3rd	4th	2nd	14
4	31	(Finland) Joni Wiman	GRX Taneco Team	Hyundai i20	9th	5th	6th	3rd	13
5	92	(Sweden) Anton Marklund	GC Kompetition	Renault Mégane RS	4th	9th	5th	5th	12
6	33	(United Kingdom) Liam Doran	Monster Energy RX Cartel	Audi S1	6th	11th	7th	6th	11
7	36	(France) Guerlain Chicherit	GC Kompetition	Renault Mégane RS	5th	10th	14th	7th	10
8	123	(Hungary) Krisztián Szabó	EKS Sport	Audi S1	7th	6th	15th	8th	9
9	44	(Germany) Timo Scheider	ALL-INKL.COM Münnich Motorsport	Seat Ibiza	16th	2nd	12th	9th	8
10	6	(Latvia) Janis Baumanis	Team Stard	Ford Fiesta	15th	4th	10th	11th	7
11	7	(Russia) Timur Timerzyanov	GRX Taneco Team	Hyundai i20	10th	8th	13th	10th	6
12	42	(United Kingdom) Oliver Bennett	Oliver Bennett	Mini Cooper	11th	13th	8th	12th	5
13	113	(France) Cyril Raymond	GCK Academy	Renault Clio RS	13th	16th	3rd	16th	4
14	3	(Finland) Jani Paasonen	Team Stard	Ford Fiesta	12th	14th	11th	13th	3
15	134	(United Kingdom) Mark Higgins	Mark Higgins	Peugeot 208	14th	15th	9th	14th	2
16	96	(Belgium) Guillaume De Ridder	GCK Academy	Renault Clio RS	8th	12th	17th	DNS	1
17	84	(France) "Knapick"	"Knapick"	Citroën DS3	DNS	17th	16th	15th	

=== Semi-final 1 ===
Pos.	No.	Driver	Team	Time	Pts
1	21	(Sweden) Timmy Hansen	Team Hansen MJP	4:04.970	6
2	92	(Sweden) Anton Marklund	GC Kompetition	+3.153	5
3	44	(Germany) Timo Scheider	ALL-INKL.COM Münnich Motorsport	+4.336	4
4	36	(France) Guerlain Chicherit	GC Kompetition	+4.847	3
5	7	(Russia) Timur Timerzyanov	GRX Taneco Team	+5.609	2
6	71	(Sweden) Kevin Hansen	Team Hansen MJP	+10.293	1

=== Semi-final 2 ===
Pos.	No.	Driver	Team	Time	Pts
1	13	(Norway) Andreas Bakkerud	Monster Energy RX Cartel	4:06.400	6
2	33	(United Kingdom) Liam Doran	Monster Energy RX Cartel	+1.368	5
3	123	(Hungary) Krisztián Szabó	EKS Sport	+4.469	4
4	6	(Latvia) Janis Baumanis	Team Stard	+5.438	3
5	42	(United Kingdom) Oliver Bennett	Oliver Bennett	DNF	2
6	31	(Finland) Joni Wiman	GRX Taneco Team	DNF	1

=== Final ===
Pos.	No.	Driver	Team	Time	Pts
1	21	(Sweden) Timmy Hansen	Team Hansen MJP	4:03.903	8
2	13	(Norway) Andreas Bakkerud	Monster Energy RX Cartel	+0.887	5
3	92	(Sweden) Anton Marklund	GC Kompetition	+1.603	4
4	44	(Germany) Timo Scheider	ALL-INKL.COM Münnich Motorsport	+2.449	3
5	123	(Hungary) Krisztián Szabó	EKS Sport	+7.681	2
6	33	(United Kingdom) Liam Doran	Monster Energy RX Cartel	DNF	1

== Standings after the event ==
Pos.	Driver	Pts	Gap
1	(Sweden) Timmy Hansen	88	
2	(Sweden) Kevin Hansen	84	+4
3	(Norway) Andreas Bakkerud	77	+11
4	(Latvia) Janis Baumanis	62	+26
5	(Russia) Timur Timerzyanov	61	+27

Previous race: 2019 World RX of Belgium	FIA World Rallycross Championship; 2019 season	Next race: 2019 World RX of Norway
Previous race: 2018 World RX of Great Britain	World RX of Great Britain	Next race: -
