= 2018 World RX of Germany =

Rallycross championship

- Round 11 of 12 in the 2018 FIA World Rallycross Championship
- Date: 13-14 October 2018
- Location: Buxtehude, Germany
- Venue: Estering Buxtehude

Results
Heat winners
- Heat 1: (Norway) Petter Solberg; PSRX Volkswagen Sweden
- Heat 2: Johan Kristoffersson; PSRX Volkswagen Sweden
- Heat 3: (Sweden) Mattias Ekström; EKS Audi Sport
- Heat 4: (Sweden) Timmy Hansen; Team Peugeot Total
Semi-final winners
- Semi-final 1: Johan Kristoffersson; PSRX Volkswagen Sweden
- Semi-final 2: (Sweden) Mattias Ekström; EKS Audi Sport
Final
- First: Johan Kristoffersson; PSRX Volkswagen Sweden
- Second: (Sweden) Mattias Ekström; EKS Audi Sport
- Third: (Norway) Andreas Bakkerud; EKS Audi Sport

World RX layout of Estering

The 2018 World RX of Germany was the eleventh round of the fifth season of the FIA World Rallycross Championship. The event was held at the Estering in Buxtehude, Lower Saxony.

== Supercar ==
=== Heats ===
Pos.	No.	Driver	Team	Car	Q1	Q2	Q3	Q4	Pts
1	1	(Sweden) Johan Kristoffersson	PSRX Volkswagen Sweden	Volkswagen Polo	2nd	1st	6th	3rd	16
2	13	(Norway) Andreas Bakkerud	EKS Audi Sport	Audi S1	6th	2nd	2nd	2nd	15
3	21	(Sweden) Timmy Hansen	Team Peugeot Total	Peugeot 208	7th	4th	3rd	1st	14
4	5	(Sweden) Mattias Ekström	EKS Audi Sport	Audi S1	4th	6th	1st	4th	13
5	11	(Norway) Petter Solberg	PSRX Volkswagen Sweden	Volkswagen Polo	1st	3rd	5th	8th	12
6	68	(Finland) Niclas Grönholm	GRX Taneco Team	Hyundai i20	5th	7th	4th	6th	11
7	71	(Sweden) Kevin Hansen	Team Peugeot Total	Peugeot 208	3rd	5th	8th	10th	10
8	9	(France) Sébastien Loeb	Team Peugeot Total	Peugeot 208	8th	9th	10th	5th	9
9	92	(Sweden) Anton Marklund	GC Kompetition	Renault Mégane RS	9th	11th	9th	11th	8
10	96	(Sweden) Kevin Eriksson	Olsbergs MSE	Ford Fiesta	10th	12th	7th	12th	7
11	6	(Latvia) Janis Baumanis	Team Stard	Ford Fiesta	12th	8th	12th	17th	6
12	4	(Sweden) Robin Larsson	Olsbergs MSE	Ford Fiesta	13th	13th	13th	13th	5
13	36	(France) Guerlain Chicherit	GC Kompetition	Renault Mégane RS	11th	10th	14th	18th	4
14	64	(Norway) Kjetil Larsen	Kjetil Larsen	Volkswagen Polo	18th	16th	15th	14th	3
15	42	(United Kingdom) Oliver Bennett	Oliver Bennett	BMW Mini Cooper	17th	14th	17th	15th	2
16	77	(Germany) René Münnich	ALL-INKL.COM Münnich Motorsport	Seat Ibiza	15th	17th	18th	16th	1
17	66	(Belgium) Gregoire Demoustier	Sébastien Loeb Racing	Peugeot 208	19th	18th	16th	19th	
18	113	(France) Cyril Raymond	Cyril Raymond	Peugeot 208	16th	19th	19th	20th	
19	33	(United Kingdom) Liam Doran	GC Kompetition	Renault Mégane RS	DQ	15th	11th	7th	
20	7	(Russia) Timur Timerzyanov	GRX Taneco Team	Hyundai i20	14th	20th	DQ	9th	

- Note: Liam Doran was disqualified from Q1 for having briefly touch the launch control button by mistake in turn 1. Timur Timerzyanov had the same issue, touching the button during his battle with Cyril Raymond in Q3.

=== Semi-finals ===
Semi-Final 1

Pos.	No.	Driver	Team	Time	Pts
1	1	(Sweden) Johan Kristoffersson	PSRX Volkswagen Sweden	3:36.940	6
2	11	(Norway) Petter Solberg	PSRX Volkswagen Sweden	+0.529	5
3	71	(Sweden) Kevin Hansen	Team Peugeot Total	+4.319	4
4	6	(Latvia) Janis Baumanis	Team Stard	+8.847	3
5	92	(Sweden) Anton Marklund	GC Kompetition	DNF	2
6	21	(Sweden) Timmy Hansen	Team Peugeot Total	DQ	

Note: Timmy Hansen was disqualified for a contact with Anton Marklund.

Semi-Final 2

Pos.	No.	Driver	Team	Time	Pts
1	5	(Sweden) Mattias Ekström	EKS Audi Sport	3:36.021	6
2	13	(Norway) Andreas Bakkerud	EKS Audi Sport	+1.782	5
3	68	(Finland) Niclas Grönholm	GRX Taneco Team	+4.730	4
4	96	(Sweden) Kevin Eriksson	Olsbergs MSE	+5.846	3
5	4	(Sweden) Robin Larsson	Olsbergs MSE	+7.794	2
6	9	(France) Sébastien Loeb	Team Peugeot Total	DNF	1

=== Final ===
Pos.	No.	Driver	Team	Time	Pts
1	1	(Sweden) Johan Kristoffersson	PSRX Volkswagen Sweden	3:33.568	8
2	5	(Sweden) Mattias Ekström	EKS Audi Sport	+1.849	5
3	13	(Norway) Andreas Bakkerud	EKS Audi Sport	+3.082	4
4	68	(Finland) Niclas Grönholm	GRX Taneco Team	+5.030	3
5	11	(Norway) Petter Solberg	PSRX Volkswagen Sweden	DNF	2
6	71	(Sweden) Kevin Hansen	Team Peugeot Total	DNF	1

== Standings after the event ==
Pos.	Driver	Pts	Gap
WC	(Sweden) Johan Kristoffersson	311	
2	(Sweden) Mattias Ekström	228	+83
3	(Norway) Andreas Bakkerud	224	+87
4	(Norway) Petter Solberg	221	+90
5	(France) Sébastien Loeb	205	+106

- Note: Only the top five positions are included.

Previous race: 2018 World RX of USA	FIA World Rallycross Championship; 2018 season	Next race: 2018 World RX of South Africa
Previous race: 2017 World RX of Germany	World RX of Germany	Next race: 2021 World RX of Germany
