= 2019 World RX of Sweden =

Season of motor racing

- Round 6 of 10 in the 2019 FIA World Rallycross Championship
- Date: 6–7 July 2019
- Location: Höljes, Värmland
- Venue: Höljesbanan

Results
Heat winners
- Heat 1: (Norway) Andreas Bakkerud; Monster Energy RX Cartel
- Heat 2: (Latvia) Reinis Nitišs; GRX Set
- Heat 3: (Norway) Andreas Bakkerud; Monster Energy RX Cartel
- Heat 4: (Sweden) Sebastian Eriksson; Olsbergs MSE
Semi-final winners
- Semi-final 1: (Sweden) Kevin Hansen; Team Hansen MJP
- Semi-final 2: (Sweden) Sebastian Eriksson; Olsbergs MSE
Final
- First: (Sweden) Sebastian Eriksson; Olsbergs MSE
- Second: (Sweden) Kevin Hansen; Team Hansen MJP
- Third: (Latvia) Reinis Nitišs; GRX Set

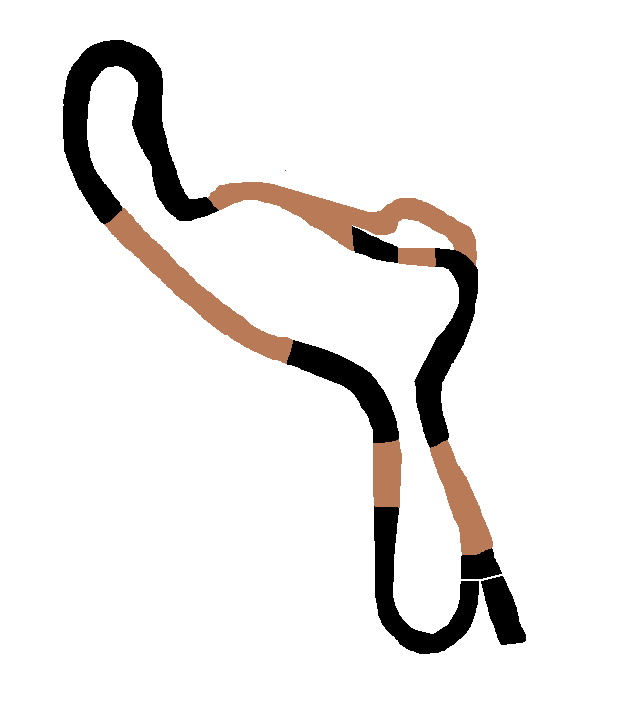
Rallycross layout of the Höljesbanan

The 2019 World RX of Sweden was the sixth round of the sixth season of the FIA World Rallycross Championship. The event was held at the Höljesbanan in the village of Höljes, Värmland.

== Supercar ==
=== Heats ===
Pos.	No.	Driver	Team	Car	Q1	Q2	Q3	Q4	Pts
1	13	(Norway) Andreas Bakkerud	Monster Energy RX Cartel	Audi S1	1st	12th	1st	9th	16
2	93	(Sweden) Sebastian Eriksson	Olsbergs MSE	Ford Fiesta MK8	11th	9th	8th	1st	15
3	71	(Sweden) Kevin Hansen	Team Hansen MJP	Peugeot 208	4th	17th	3rd	3rd	14
4	15	(Latvia) Reinis Nitišs	GRX Set	Hyundai i20	25th	1st	5th	4th	13
5	21	(Sweden) Timmy Hansen	Team Hansen MJP	Peugeot 208	20th	4th	2nd	6th	13
6	68	(Finland) Niclas Grönholm	GRX Taneco Team	Hyundai i20	3rd	19th	4th	5th	11
7	24	(Netherlands) Kevin Abbring	ES Motorsport-Labas GAS	Škoda Fabia	17th	3rd	14th	2nd	10
8	14	(Lithuania) Rokas Baciuška	GCK Academy	Renault Mégane R.S.	6th	16th	10th	7th	9
9	92	(Sweden) Anton Marklund	GC Kompetition	Renault Mégane R.S.	12th	5th	7th	18th	8
10	6	(Latvia) Jānis Baumanis	Team STARD	Ford Fiesta MK8	5th	21st	12th	8th	7
11	196	(Sweden) Kevin Eriksson	Olsbergs MSE	Ford Fiesta MK8	9th	10th	9th	19th	6
12	22	(Finland) Jere Kalliokoski	Team STARD	Ford Fiesta MK8	7th	18th	13th	13th	5
13	18	(France) Jonathan Pailler	Jonathan Pailler	Peugeot 208	16th	11th	17th	12th	4
14	36	(France) Guerlain Chicherit	GC Kompetition	Renault Mégane R.S.	21st	2nd	16th	20th	3
15	33	(United Kingdom) Liam Doran	Monster Energy RX Cartel	Audi S1	13th	20th	15th	10th	2
16	20	(France) Fabien Pailler	Fabien Pailler	Peugeot 208	14th	8th	23rd	17th	1
17	123	(Hungary) Krisztián Szabó	EKS Sport	Audi S1	8th	15th	22nd	21st	
18	64	(Norway) Kjetil Larsen	Hedströms Motorsport	Peugeot 208	18th	14th	20th	15th	
19	96	(Belgium) Guillaume De Ridder	GCK Academy	Renault Clio R.S.	22nd	24th	6th	14rd	
20	113	(France) Cyril Raymond	GCK Academy	Renault Clio R.S.	10th	13th	19th	23rd	
21	95	(Sweden) Philip Gehrman	Bridgestone Motorsport	Volkswagen Polo	23rd	23rd	11th	11th	
22	42	(United Kingdom) Oliver Bennett	Oliver Bennett	Mini Cooper	24th	25th	18th	16th	
23	44	(Germany) Timo Scheider	ALL-INKL.COM Münnich Motorsport	SEAT Ibiza	15th	6th	21st	DQ	
24	7	(Russia) Timur Timerzyanov	GRX Taneco Team	Hyundai i20	2nd	22nd	DQ	22nd	
25	72	(Denmark) Ulrik Linnemann	Olsbergs MSE	Honda Civic Coupé	19th	18th	DQ	DQ	

=== Semi-final 1 ===
Pos.	No.	Driver	Team	Time	Pts
1	71	(Sweden) Kevin Hansen	Team Hansen MJP	4:29.963	6
2	21	(Sweden) Timmy Hansen	Team Hansen MJP	+ 1.530	5
3	24	(Netherlands) Kevin Abbring	ES Motorsport-Labas GAS	+ 1.761	4
4	92	(Sweden) Anton Marklund	GC Kompetition	+ 3.497	3
5	196	(Sweden) Kevin Eriksson	Olsbergs MSE	+ 7.672	2
6	13	(Norway) Andreas Bakkerud	Monster Energy RX Cartel	+ 46.389	1

=== Semi-final 2 ===
Pos.	No.	Driver	Team	Time	Pts
1	93	(Sweden) Sebastian Eriksson	Olsbergs MSE	4:28.737	6
2	68	(Finland) Niclas Grönholm	GRX Taneco Team	+ 0.622	5
3	15	(Latvia) Reinis Nitišs	GRX Set	+ 3.741	4
4	6	(Latvia) Jānis Baumanis	Team STARD	+ 14.933	3
5	22	(Finland) Jere Kalliokoski	Team STARD	+ 40.332	2
6	14	(Lithuania) Rokas Baciuška	GCK Academy	DNF	1

=== Final ===
Pos.	No.	Driver	Team	Time	Pts
1	93	(Sweden) Sebastian Eriksson	Olsbergs MSE	4:26.658	8
2	71	(Sweden) Kevin Hansen	Team Hansen MJP	+ 0.338	5
3	15	(Latvia) Reinis Nitišs	GRX Set	+ 4.331	4
4	24	(Netherlands) Kevin Abbring	ES Motorsport-Labas GAS	+ 20.110	3
5	68	(Finland) Niclas Grönholm	GRX Taneco Team	+ 21.522	2
6	21	(Sweden) Timmy Hansen	Team Hansen MJP	+ 45.860	1

== Standings after the event ==
Pos.	Driver	Pts	Gap
1	(Sweden) Kevin Hansen	131	
2	(Sweden) Timmy Hansen	125	+6
3	(Norway) Andreas Bakkerud	109	+22
4	(Finland) Niclas Grönholm	96	+35
5	(Latvia) Janis Baumanis	89	+42
6	(Russia) Timur Timerzyanov	78	+53

- Note: Only the top six positions are included.

Previous race: 2019 World RX of Norway	FIA World Rallycross Championship; 2019 season	Next race: 2019 World RX of Canada
Previous race: 2018 World RX of Sweden	World RX of Sweden	Next race: 2020 World RX of Sweden
