= GC Kompetition =

Motor racing team created in 2021

(France) GCK Motorsport
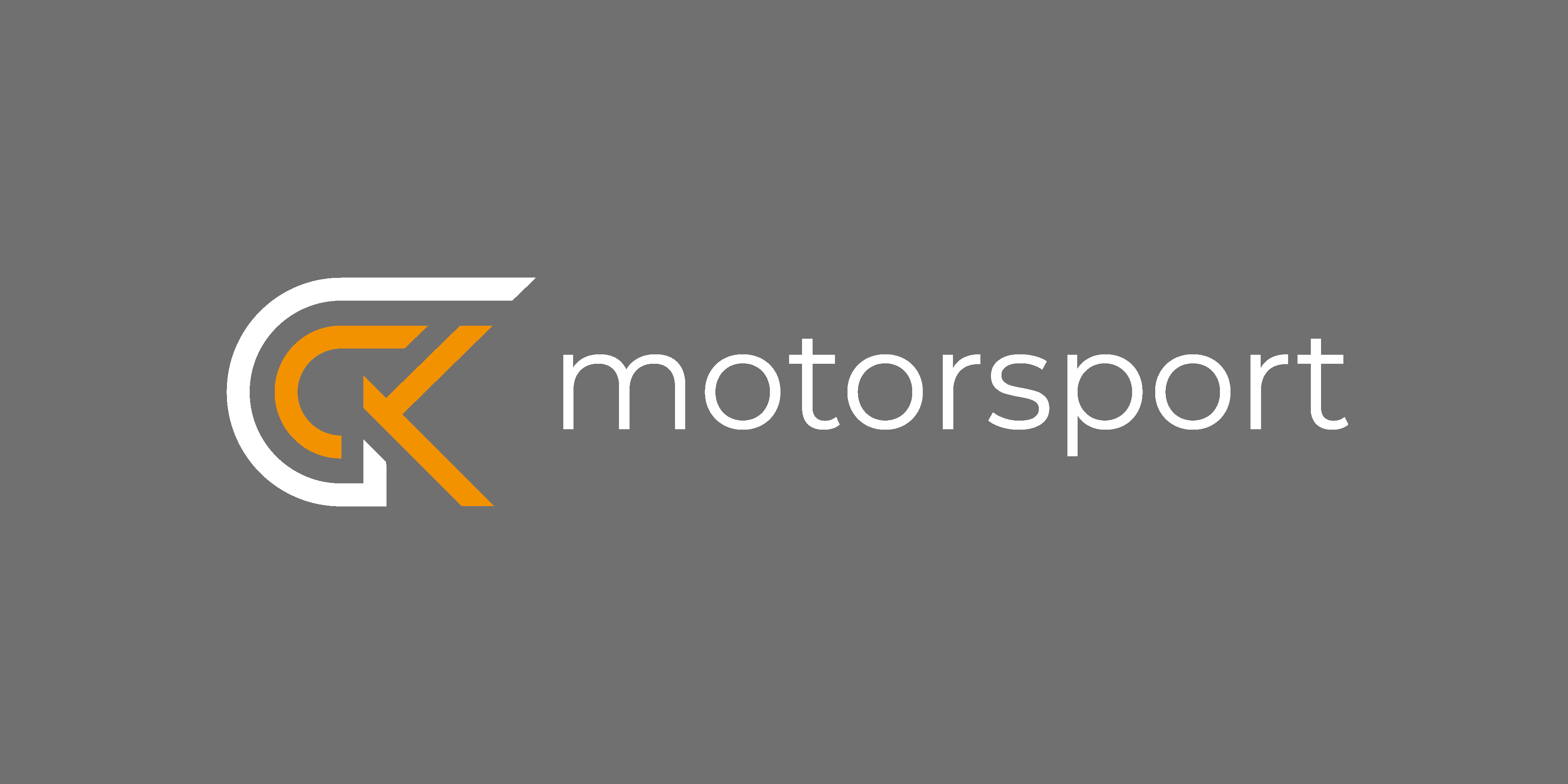
- Founded: 2017
- Founder(s): Guerlain Chicherit
- Base: Tignes, France
- Team principal(s): Guerlain Chicherit
- Current series: FIA World Rallycross Championship
- Current drivers: (France) 36. Guerlain Chicherit (Sweden) 92. Anton Marklund (Belgium) 96. Guillaume de Ridder (France) 113. Cyril Raymond (Lithuania) 14. Rokas Baciuška

GCK Motorsport, formally known as GC Kompetition, is a subsidiary of Green Corp Konnection (GCK) and a French motorsport team founded by freeriding ski champion, rally driver and stunt driver Guerlain Chicherit in 2017. GCK made its debut in the 2018 FIA World Rallycross Championship, fielding two Renault Méganes, built by British motorsport company Prodrive.

The team grew to four cars for 2019, with the two Renault Méganes of GC Kompetition joined by two Renault Clios as part of a new GCK Academy team. From round 5 onwards the team grew again to five cars, with another Renault Mégane for young driver Rokas Baciuška.

For 2020, GCK grew again to five permanent cars competing in the FIA World Rallycross Championship, with two Renault Méganes now driven by X-Games Gold Medalist Liam Doran & 2019 FIA World Rallycross Championship runner-up Andreas Bakkerud as GCK Monster Energy RX Cartel. They were joined by two Renault Clios as part of a new Unkorrupted team driven by Guerlain Chicherit and Rokas Baciuska and another Renault Mégane for Anton Marklund as GCK Bilstein independently. Results were uninspiring for GCK with all cars showing a lack of performance and reliability, most notably Unkorrupted who changed driver line up following Rokas Baciuska departure ahead of Round 3 in Finland, Kevin Abbring stepped in to take his place but both Unkorrupted cars failed to qualify including Liam Doran who was plagued with reliability issues.

GCK Motorsport is not an official Renault factory team, though Chicherit has said he has ambitions to partner with a manufacturer in the future of Rallycross Electrification and Dakar Rally where GCK Motorsport is developing a Hydrogen-powered vehicle for 2024.

== Racing record ==
=== Complete FIA World Rallycross Championship results ===
(key)

==== Supercar ====
Year	Entrant	Car	No.	Driver	1	2	3	4	5	6	7	8	9	10	11	12	WRX	Points	Teams	Points
2018	GC Kompetition	Renault Mégane RS RX	36	(France) Guerlain Chicherit	BAR; 12	POR; 5	BEL; 12	GBR; 15	NOR; 15	SWE; 14	CAN; 15	FRA; 12	LAT; 10	USA; 9	GER; 13	RSA; 12	11th	68	5th	152
2018	GC Kompetition	Renault Mégane RS RX	74	(France) Jérôme Grosset-Janin	BAR; 11	POR; 14	BEL; 14	GBR; 10	NOR; 14	SWE; 3	CAN; 12	FRA	LAT	USA	GER	RSA	12th	47	5th	152
2018	GC Kompetition	Renault Mégane RS RX	33	(United Kingdom) Liam Doran	BAR	POR	BEL	GBR	NOR	SWE	CAN	FRA; 8	LAT; 12	USA	GER; 19	RSA	16th	19	5th	152
2018	GC Kompetition	Renault Mégane RS RX	92	(Sweden) Anton Marklund	BAR	POR	BEL	GBR	NOR	SWE	CAN	FRA	LAT	USA; 12	GER; 9	RSA; 8	14th	35	5th	152
2019	GC Kompetition	Renault Mégane RS RX	36	(France) Guerlain Chicherit	UAE; 10	BAR; 9	BEL; 13	GBR; 9	NOR; 11	SWE; 14	CAN; 4	FRA; 13	LAT; 15	RSA; 7			12th	73	4th	192
2019	GC Kompetition	Renault Mégane RS RX	92	(Sweden) Anton Marklund	UAE; 7	BAR; 14	BEL; 7	GBR; 3	NOR; DSQ	SWE; 8	CAN; 5	FRA; 2	LAT; 9	RSA; 8			7th	119	4th	192
2019	GCK Academy	Renault Clio RS RX	96	(Belgium) Guillaume de Ridder	UAE; 16	BAR; 11	BEL; 15	GBR; 16	NOR; 15	SWE; 19	CAN; 14	FRA; 16	LAT; 14	RSA; 10			18th	29	6th	74
2019	GCK Academy	Renault Clio RS RX	113	(France) Cyril Raymond	UAE; 12	BAR; 5	BEL; 12	GBR; 13	NOR; 10	SWE; 20	CAN; 11	FRA; 15	LAT; 13	RSA; 15			13th	45	6th	74
2019	GCK Academy	Renault Mégane RS RX	14	(Lithuania) Rokas Baciuska					NOR; 16	SWE; 9	CAN; 9	FRA; 4	LAT; 7	RSA			11th	76		
