= 2019 World RX of Benelux =

Rallycross championship event

- Round 3 of 10 in the 2019 FIA World Rallycross Championship
- Date: 11-12 May 2019
- Location: Francorchamps, Liège Province
- Venue: Circuit de Spa-Francorchamps

Results
Heat winners
- Heat 1: (Norway) Andreas Bakkerud; Monster Energy RX Cartel
- Heat 2: (United Kingdom) Liam Doran; Monster Energy RX Cartel
- Heat 3: (Norway) Andreas Bakkerud; Monster Energy RX Cartel
- Heat 4: (Sweden) Timmy Hansen; Team Hansen MJP
Semi-final winners
- Semi-final 1: (Norway) Andreas Bakkerud; Monster Energy RX Cartel
- Semi-final 2: (Finland) Joni Wiman; GRX Taneco Team
Final
- First: (Russia) Timur Timerzyanov; GRX Taneco Team
- Second: (Norway) Andreas Bakkerud; Monster Energy RX Cartel
- Third: (Finland) Joni Wiman; GRX Taneco Team

World RX layout of Circuit de Spa-Francorchamps

The 2019 Spa World RX of Benelux was the third round of the sixth season of the FIA World Rallycross Championship. The event was held at the Circuit de Spa-Francorchamps in Francorchamps, Belgium.

Niclas Grönholm has missed this round due to undergo an Appendicitis operation in Finland. Joni Wiman, who originally was planned to drive a third car, replace him as teams' championship scorer, and the team switch back to two cars.

== Supercar ==
=== Heats ===
| Pos. | No. | Driver | Team | Car | Q1 | Q2 | Q3 | Q4 | Pts |
|---|---|---|---|---|---|---|---|---|---|
| 1 | 13 | (Norway) Andreas Bakkerud | Monster Energy RX Cartel | Audi S1 | 1st | 9th | 1st | 5th | 16 |
| 2 | 31 | (Finland) Joni Wiman | GRX Taneco Team | Hyundai i20 | 5th | 4th | 5th | 3rd | 15 |
| 3 | 33 | (United Kingdom) Liam Doran | Monster Energy RX Cartel | Audi S1 | 7th | 1st | 6th | 10th | 14 |
| 4 | 21 | (Sweden) Timmy Hansen | Team Hansen MJP | Peugeot 208 | 6th | 10th | 10th | 1st | 13 |
| 5 | 7 | (Russia) Timur Timerzyanov | GRX Taneco Team | Hyundai i20 | 8th | 6th | 4th | 4th | 12 |
| 6 | 92 | (Sweden) Anton Marklund | GC Kompetition | Renault Mégane RS | 2nd | 15th | 11th | 2nd | 11 |
| 7 | 71 | (Sweden) Kevin Hansen | Team Hansen MJP | Peugeot 208 | 10th | 8th | 2nd | 8th | 10 |
| 8 | 6 | (Latvia) Janis Baumanis | Team Stard | Ford Fiesta | 15th | 2nd | 8th | 6th | 9 |
| 9 | 44 | (Germany) Timo Scheider | ALL-INKL.COM Münnich Motorsport | Seat Ibiza | 4th | 5th | 14th | 7th | 8 |
| 10 | 40 | (Sweden) Mattias Ekström | Mattias Ekström | Audi S1 | 9th | 12th | 3rd | 9th | 7 |
| 11 | 123 | (Hungary) Krisztián Szabó | EKS Sport | Audi S1 | 3rd | 11th | 7th | 20th | 6 |
| 12 | 113 | (France) Cyril Raymond | GCK Academy | Renault Clio RS | 12th | 3rd | 15th | 13th | 5 |
| 13 | 36 | (France) Guerlain Chicherit | GC Kompetition | Renault Mégane RS | 18th | 7th | 9th | 17th | 4 |
| 14 | 42 | (United Kingdom) Oliver Bennett | Oliver Bennett | Mini Cooper | 13th | 14th | 16th | 11th | 3 |
| 15 | 96 | (Belgium) Guillaume De Ridder | GCK Academy | Renault Clio RS | 14th | 13th | 20th | 12th | 2 |
| 16 | 5 | (Norway) Pal Try | Team Stard | Ford Fiesta | 16th | 16th | 12th | 18th | 1 |
| 17 | 67 | (Belgium) François Duval | ES Motorsport - Labas GAS | Škoda Fabia | 11th | 19th | 13th | 19th | |
| 18 | 39 | (Belgium) Enzo Ide | Team JC Race Teknik | Audi S1 | 20th | 17th | 17th | 14th | |
| 19 | 66 | (Belgium) Grégoire Demoustier | Grégoire Demoustier | Peugeot 208 | 17th | 20th | 18th | 15th | |
| 20 | 84 | (France) "Knapick" | "Knapick" | Citroën DS3 | 19th | 18th | 19th | 16th | |

=== Semi-finals ===
Semi-Final 1

| Pos. | No. | Driver | Team | Time | Pts |
|---|---|---|---|---|---|
| 1 | 13 | (Norway) Andreas Bakkerud | Monster Energy RX Cartel | 3:22.773 | 6 |
| 2 | 7 | (Russia) Timur Timerzyanov | GRX Taneco Team | +0.144 | 5 |
| 3 | 33 | (United Kingdom) Liam Doran | Monster Energy RX Cartel | +1.591 | 4 |
| 4 | 71 | (Sweden) Kevin Hansen | Team Hansen MJP | +1.674 | 3 |
| 5 | 44 | (Germany) Timo Scheider | ALL-INKL.COM Münnich Motorsport | +4.393 | 2 |
| 6 | 123 | (Hungary) Krisztián Szabó | EKS Sport | +5.629 | 1 |

Semi-Final 2

| Pos. | No. | Driver | Team | Time | Pts |
|---|---|---|---|---|---|
| 1 | 31 | (Finland) Joni Wiman | GRX Taneco Team | 3:21.340 | 6 |
| 2 | 6 | (Latvia) Janis Baumanis | Team Stard | +1.830 | 5 |
| 3 | 21 | (Sweden) Timmy Hansen | Team Hansen MJP | +2.185 | 4 |
| 4 | 92 | (Sweden) Anton Marklund | GC Kompetition | +3.336 | 3 |
| 5 | 113 | (France) Cyril Raymond | GCK Academy | +4.316 | 2 |
| 6 | 40 | (Sweden) Mattias Ekström | Mattias Ekström | +4.926 | 1 |

=== Final ===
| Pos. | No. | Driver | Team | Time | Pts |
|---|---|---|---|---|---|
| 1 | 7 | (Russia) Timur Timerzyanov | GRX Taneco Team | 3:21.352 | 8 |
| 2 | 13 | (Norway) Andreas Bakkerud | Monster Energy RX Cartel | +2.002 | 5 |
| 3 | 31 | (Finland) Joni Wiman | GRX Taneco Team | +2.702 | 4 |
| 4 | 21 | (Sweden) Timmy Hansen | Team Hansen MJP | +5.420 | 3 |
| 5 | 6 | (Latvia) Janis Baumanis | Team Stard | +7.608 | 2 |
| 6 | 33 | (United Kingdom) Liam Doran | Monster Energy RX Cartel | +16.373 | 1 |

== Standings after the event ==
| Pos. | Driver | Pts | Gap |
|---|---|---|---|
| 1 | (Sweden) Kevin Hansen | 69 | |
| 2 | (Sweden) Timmy Hansen | 58 | +11 |
| 3 | (Russia) Timur Timerzyanov | 53 | +16 |
| 4 | (Latvia) Janis Baumanis | 52 | +17 |
| 5 | (Norway) Andreas Bakkerud | 51 | +18 |

- Note: Only the top five positions are included.

| Previous race: 2019 World RX of Catalunya | FIA World Rallycross Championship; 2019 season | Next race: 2019 World RX of Great Britain |
| Previous race: 2018 World RX of Belgium | World RX of Benelux | Next race: 2021 World RX of Benelux |
