= 2018 World RX of Barcelona =

Rallycross event

- Round 1 of 12 in the 2018 FIA World Rallycross Championship
- Date: 14–15 April 2018
- Location: Montmeló, Catalonia
- Venue: Circuit de Barcelona-Catalunya

Results
Heat winners
- Heat 1: (Sweden) Mattias Ekström; EKS Audi Sport
- Heat 2: (Norway) Petter Solberg; PSRX Volkswagen Sweden
- Heat 3: (Norway) Petter Solberg; PSRX Volkswagen Sweden
- Heat 4: (Sweden) Timmy Hansen; Team Peugeot Total
Semi-final winners
- Semi-final 1: (Norway) Petter Solberg; PSRX Volkswagen Sweden
- Semi-final 2: (Sweden) Mattias Ekström; EKS Audi Sport
Final
- First: Johan Kristoffersson; PSRX Volkswagen Sweden
- Second: (France) Sébastien Loeb; Team Peugeot Total
- Third: (Norway) Andreas Bakkerud; EKS Audi Sport

Rallycross layout of the Circuit de Catalunya

The 2018 World RX of Barcelona was the first round of the fifth season of the FIA World Rallycross Championship. The event was held at the Circuit de Barcelona-Catalunya in Montmeló, Catalonia.

== Heats ==
Pos.	No.	Driver	Team	Car	Q1	Q2	Q3	Q4	Pts
1	11	(Norway) Petter Solberg	PSRX Volkswagen Sweden	Volkswagen Polo R	2nd	1st	1st	2nd	16
2	21	(Sweden) Timmy Hansen	Team Peugeot Total	Peugeot 208	17th	2nd	2nd	1st	15
3	1	(Sweden) Johan Kristoffersson	PSRX Volkswagen Sweden	Volkswagen Polo R	3rd	5th	4th	3rd	14
4	5	(Sweden) Mattias Ekström	EKS Audi Sport	Audi S1	1st	7th	9th	4th	13
5	13	(Norway) Andreas Bakkerud	EKS Audi Sport	Audi S1	5th	4th	3rd	6th	12
6	68	(Finland) Niclas Grönholm	GRX Taneco Team	Hyundai i20	16th	6th	5th	5th	11
7	4	(Sweden) Robin Larsson	Olsbergs MSE	Ford Fiesta	9th	8th	8th	7th	10
8	6	(Latvia) Jānis Baumanis	STARD	Ford Fiesta	7th	9th	6th	11th	9
9	7	(Russia) Timur Timerzyanov	GRX Taneco Team	Hyundai i20	10th	12th	7th	9th	8
10	74	(France) Jérôme Grosset-Janin	GC Kompetition	Renault Mégane RS	6th	10th	11th	12th	7
11	36	(France) Guerlain Chicherit	GC Kompetition	Renault Mégane RS	8th	11th	10th	12th	6
12	71	(Sweden) Kevin Hansen	Team Peugeot Total	Peugeot 208	12th	3rd	14th	14th	5
13	9	(France) Sébastien Loeb	Team Peugeot Total	Peugeot 208	4th	17th	17th	8th	4
14	96	(Sweden) Kevin Eriksson	Olsbergs MSE	Ford Fiesta	11th	16th	13th	10th	3
15	42	(United Kingdom) Oliver Bennett	Oliver Bennett	MINI Cooper	14th	13th	12th	15th	2
16	66	(France) Grégoire Demoustier	Sébastien Loeb Racing	Peugeot 208	15th	14th	15th	16th	1
17	84	(France) "Knapick"	"Knapick"	Citroën DS3	13th	15th	16th	17th	

== Semi-finals ==
Semi-final 1

Pos.	No.	Driver	Team	Time/Retired	Pts
1	11	(Norway) Petter Solberg	PSRX Volkswagen Sweden	4:42.350	6
2	1	(Sweden) Johan Kristoffersson	PSRX Volkswagen Sweden	+2.886	5
3	13	(Norway) Andreas Bakkerud	EKS Audi Sport	+3.127	4
4	7	(Russia) Timur Timerzyanov	GRX Taneco Team	+5.656	3
5	36	(France) Guerlain Chicherit	GC Kompetition	+6.177	2
6	4	(Sweden) Robin Larsson	Olsbergs MSE	+9.799	1

Semi-final 2

Pos.	No.	Driver	Team	Time/Retired	Pts
1	5	(Sweden) Mattias Ekström	EKS Audi Sport	4:43.579	6
2	9	(France) Sébastien Loeb‡	Team Peugeot Total	+3.573	5
3	68	(Finland) Niclas Grönholm	GRX Taneco Team	+5.107	4
4	6	(Latvia) Jānis Baumanis	STARD	+5.621	3
5	74	(France) Jérôme Grosset-Janin	GC Kompetition	+6.284	2
6	21	(Sweden) Timmy Hansen	Team Peugeot Total	DNF	1

‡ Loeb initially qualified 13th, however was promoted to a semi-final position following the withdrawal of Kevin Hansen.

== Final ==
Pos.	No.	Driver	Team	Time/Retired	Pts
1	1	(Sweden) Johan Kristoffersson	PSRX Volkswagen Sweden	4:36.568	8
2	9	(France) Sébastien Loeb	Team Peugeot Total	+1.215	5
3	13	(Norway) Andreas Bakkerud	EKS Audi Sport	+2.389	4
4	68	(Finland) Niclas Grönholm	GRX Taneco Team	+7.099	3
5	11	(Norway) Petter Solberg	PSRX Volkswagen Sweden	+11.264	2
DSQ	5	(Sweden) Mattias Ekström	EKS Audi Sport		

== Standings after the event ==
Pos	Driver	Pts	Gap
1	(Sweden) Johan Kristoffersson	27	
2	(Norway) Petter Solberg	24	+3
3	(Norway) Andreas Bakkerud	20	+7
4	(Sweden) Mattias Ekström	19	+8
5	(Finland) Niclas Grönholm	18	+9

Previous race: 2017 World RX of South Africa	FIA World Rallycross Championship; 2018 season	Next race: 2018 World RX of Portugal
Previous race: 2017 World RX of Barcelona	World RX of Barcelona	Next race: 2019 World RX of Catalunya
