= 2019 World RX of Canada =

Edition of motorsport race

- Round 7 of 10 in the 2019 FIA World Rallycross Championship
- Date: 3 - 4 August 2019
- Location: Trois-Rivières, Quebec
- Venue: Circuit Trois-Rivières

Results
Heat winners
- Heat 1: (Norway) Andreas Bakkerud; Monster Energy RX Cartel
- Heat 2: (Finland) Niclas Grönholm; GRX Taneco Team
- Heat 3: (Russia) Timur Timerzyanov; GRX Taneco Team
- Heat 4: (Finland) Niclas Grönholm; GRX Taneco Team
Semi-final winners
- Semi-final 1: (Russia) Timur Timerzyanov; GRX Taneco Team
- Semi-final 2: (Norway) Andreas Bakkerud; Monster Energy RX Cartel
Final
- First: (Norway) Andreas Bakkerud; Monster Energy RX Cartel
- Second: (Latvia) Janis Baumanis; Team STARD
- Third: (Russia) Timur Timerzyanov; GRX Taneco Team

World RX layout of Circuit Trois-Rivières

The 2019 World RX of Canada was the seventh round and final race before the summer break of the sixth season of the FIA World Rallycross Championship. The event was held at the Circuit Trois-Rivières in Trois-Rivières, Quebec.

== Supercar ==
=== Heats ===
Pos.	No.	Driver	Team	Car	Q1	Q2	Q3	Q4	Pts
1	68	(Finland) Niclas Grönholm	GRX Taneco Team	Hyundai i20	6th	1st	2nd	1st	16
2	13	(Norway) Andreas Bakkerud	Monster Energy RX Cartel	Audi S1	1st	8th	3rd	11th	15
3	7	(Russia) Timur Timerzyanov	GRX Taneco Team	Hyundai i20	3rd	9th	1st	13th	14
4	36	(France) Guerlain Chicherit	GC Kompetition	Renault Mégane R.S.	7th	2nd	16th	3rd	13
5	6	(Latvia) Jānis Baumanis	Team STARD	Ford Fiesta MK8	9th	5th	13th	2nd	12
6	33	(United Kingdom) Liam Doran	Monster Energy RX Cartel	Audi S1	2nd	15th	5th	12th	11
7	14	(Lithuania) Rokas Baciuška	GC Kompetition	Renault Mégane R.S.	15th	3rd	11th	4th	10
8	92	(Sweden) Anton Marklund	GC Kompetition	Renault Mégane R.S.	4th	6th	8th	14th	9
9	71	(Sweden) Kevin Hansen	Team Hansen MJP	Peugeot 208	10th	11th	7th	5th	8
10	44	(Germany) Timo Scheider	ALL-INKL.COM Münnich Motorsport	SEAT Ibiza	8th	4th	14th	8th	7
11	113	(France) Cyril Raymond	GCK Academy	Renault Clio R.S.	11th	13th	6th	6th	6
12	123	(Hungary) Krisztián Szabó	EKS Sport	Audi S1	12th	7th	10th	7th	5
13	21	(Sweden) Timmy Hansen	Team Hansen MJP	Peugeot 208	5th	14th	4th	15th	4
14	96	(Belgium) Guillaume De Ridder	GCK Academy	Renault Clio R.S.	14th	12th	12th	10th	3
15	42	(United Kingdom) Oliver Bennett	Oliver Bennett	Mini Cooper	16th	10th	9th	16th	2
16	3	(Finland) Jani Paasonen	Team Stard	Ford Fiesta MK8	13th	16th	15th	9th	1

=== Semi-finals ===
Semi-Final 1

Pos.	No.	Driver	Team	Time	Pts
1	7	(Russia) Timur Timerzyanov	GRX Taneco Team	5:04.386	6
2	6	(Latvia) Jānis Baumanis	Team STARD	+ 2.295	5
3	71	(Sweden) Kevin Hansen	Team Hansen MJP	+ 3.071	4
4	68	(Finland) Niclas Grönholm	GRX Taneco Team	+ 3.757	3
5	14	(Lithuania) Rokas Baciuška	GC Kompetition	DNF	2
6	113	(France) Cyril Raymond	GCK Academy	DNF	1

Semi-Final 2

Pos.	No.	Driver	Team	Time	Pts
1	13	(Norway) Andreas Bakkerud	Monster Energy RX Cartel	5:02.614	6
2	36	(France) Guerlain Chicherit	GC Kompetition	+ 3.017	5
3	92	(Sweden) Anton Marklund	GC Kompetition	+ 3.720	4
4	33	(United Kingdom) Liam Doran	Monster Energy RX Cartel	+ 5.887	3
5	123	(Hungary) Krisztián Szabó	EKS Sport	+ 6.754	2
6	44	(Germany) Timo Scheider	ALL-INKL.COM Münnich Motorsport	+ 9.951	1

=== Final ===
Pos.	No.	Driver	Team	Time	Pts
1	13	(Norway) Andreas Bakkerud	Monster Energy RX Cartel	5:04.720	8
2	6	(Latvia) Jānis Baumanis	Team STARD	+ 1.220	5
3	7	(Russia) Timur Timerzyanov	GRX Taneco Team	+ 1.695	4
4	36	(France) Guerlain Chicherit	GC Kompetition	+ 14.954	3
5	92	(Sweden) Anton Marklund	GC Kompetition	DNF	2
	21	(Sweden) Kevin Hansen	Team Hansen MJP	DQ	

== Standings after the event ==
Pos.	Driver	Pts	Gap
1	(Sweden) Kevin Hansen	143	
2	(Norway) Andreas Bakkerud	138	+5
3	(Sweden) Timmy Hansen	129	+14
4	(Finland) Niclas Grönholm	115	+28
5	(Latvia) Janis Baumanis	111	+32
6	(Russia) Timur Timerzyanov	102	+41

- Note: Only the top six positions are included.

Previous race: 2019 World RX of Sweden	FIA World Rallycross Championship; 2019 season	Next race: 2019 World RX of France
Previous race: 2018 World RX of Canada	World RX of Canada	Next race: none
