= 2019 World RX of Norway =

Rallycross championship event

- Round 5 of 10 in the 2019 FIA World Rallycross Championship
- Date: 15-16 June 2019
- Location: Hell, Nord-Trøndelag
- Venue: Lånkebanen

Results
Heat winners
- Heat 1: (Finland) Niclas Grönholm; GRX Taneco Team
- Heat 2: (Finland) Niclas Grönholm; GRX Taneco Team
- Heat 3: (Sweden) Timmy Hansen; Team Hansen MJP
- Heat 4: (Finland) Niclas Grönholm; GRX Taneco Team
Semi-final winners
- Semi-final 1: (Finland) Niclas Grönholm; GRX Taneco Team
- Semi-final 2: (United Kingdom) Liam Doran; Monster Energy RX Cartel
Final
- First: (Finland) Niclas Grönholm; GRX Taneco Team
- Second: (Sweden) Kevin Hansen; Team Hansen MJP
- Third: (Latvia) Janis Baumanis; Team Stard

World RX layout of Lånkebanen

The 2019 World RX of Norway was the fifth round of the sixth season of the FIA World Rallycross Championship. The event was held at the Lånkebanen near Hell, Nord-Trøndelag.

== Supercar ==
=== Heats ===
Pos.	No.	Driver	Team	Car	Q1	Q2	Q3	Q4	Pts
1	68	(Finland) Niclas Grönholm	GRX Taneco Team	Hyundai i20	1st	1st	5th	1st	16
2	21	(Sweden) Timmy Hansen	Team Hansen MJP	Peugeot 208	4th	5th	1st	2nd	15
3	7	(Russia) Timur Timerzyanov	GRX Taneco Team	Hyundai i20	3rd	3rd	3rd	6th	14
4	13	(Norway) Andreas Bakkerud	Monster Energy RX Cartel	Audi S1	2nd	9th	6th	3rd	13
5	71	(Sweden) Kevin Hansen	Team Hansen MJP	Peugeot 208	9th	6th	2nd	4th	12
6	44	(Germany) Timo Scheider	ALL-INKL.COM Münnich Motorsport	Seat Ibiza	6th	2nd	8th	5th	11
7	24	(Netherlands) Kevin Abbring	ES Motorsport - Labas GAS	Škoda Fabia	5th	15th	4th	8th	10
8	6	(Latvia) Janis Baumanis	Team Stard	Ford Fiesta	15th	4th	9th	9th	9
9	113	(France) Cyril Raymond	GCK Academy	Renault Clio RS	10th	7th	11th	12th	8
10	36	(France) Guerlain Chicherit	GC Kompetition	Renault Mégane RS	13th	11th	10th	7th	7
11	33	(United Kingdom) Liam Doran	Monster Energy RX Cartel	Audi S1	8th	12th	7th	14th	6
12	123	(Hungary) Krisztián Szabó	EKS Sport	Audi S1	12th	8th	12th	13th	5
13	3	(Finland) Jani Paasonen	Team Stard	Ford Fiesta	11th	13th	15th	11th	4
14	42	(United Kingdom) Oliver Bennett	Oliver Bennett	Mini Cooper	14th	14th	13th	15th	3
15	96	(Belgium) Guillaume De Ridder	GCK Academy	Renault Clio RS	16th	10th	14th	16th	2
16	14	(Lithuania) Rokas Baciuska	GCK Academy	Renault Mégane RS	7th	16th	DQ	10th	1
17	92	(Sweden) Anton Marklund	GC Kompetition	Renault Mégane RS	DQ	DQ	DQ	DQ	

- Note: Anton Marklund was disqualified (after the race) from the whole event for a technical infringement.

=== Semi-finals ===
Semi-Final 1

Pos.	No.	Driver	Team	Time	Pts
1	68	(Finland) Niclas Grönholm	GRX Taneco Team	4:34.070	6
2	24	(Netherlands) Kevin Abbring	ES Motorsport - Labas GAS	+8.143	5
3	6	(Latvia) Janis Baumanis	Team Stard	+9.402	4
4	7	(Russia) Timur Timerzyanov	GRX Taneco Team	+10.338	3
5	36	(France) Guerlain Chicherit	GC Kompetition	+17.205	2
6	44	(Germany) Timo Scheider	ALL-INKL.COM Münnich Motorsport	DNF	1

Semi-Final 2

Pos.	No.	Driver	Team	Time	Pts
1	33	(United Kingdom) Liam Doran	Monster Energy RX Cartel	4:34.094	6
2	71	(Sweden) Kevin Hansen	Team Hansen MJP	+2.051	5
3	21	(Sweden) Timmy Hansen	Team Hansen MJP	+2.803	4
4	113	(France) Cyril Raymond	GCK Academy	+3.335	3
5	13	(Norway) Andreas Bakkerud	Monster Energy RX Cartel	+4.248	2
6	92	(Sweden) Anton Marklund	GC Kompetition	DQ	

=== Final ===
Pos.	No.	Driver	Team	Time	Pts
1	68	(Finland) Niclas Grönholm	GRX Taneco Team	4:35.753	8
2	71	(Sweden) Kevin Hansen	Team Hansen MJP	+0.344	5
3	6	(Latvia) Janis Baumanis	Team Stard	+0.817	4
4	24	(Netherlands) Kevin Abbring	ES Motorsport - Labas GAS	+2.412	3
5	33	(United Kingdom) Liam Doran	Monster Energy RX Cartel	+20.763	2
6	92	(Sweden) Anton Marklund	GC Kompetition	DQ	

== Standings after the event ==
Pos.	Driver	Pts	Gap
1	(Sweden) Timmy Hansen	107	
2	(Sweden) Kevin Hansen	106	+1
3	(Norway) Andreas Bakkerud	92	+15
4	(Latvia) Janis Baumanis	79	+28
5	(Finland) Niclas Grönholm	78	+29
	(Russia) Timur Timerzyanov	78	+29

- Note: Only the top five positions are included.

Previous race: 2019 World RX of Great Britain	FIA World Rallycross Championship; 2019 season	Next race: 2019 World RX of Sweden
Previous race: 2018 World RX of Norway	World RX of Norway	Next race: 2022 World RX of Norway
