= 2019 World RX of France =

Rallycross event

- Round 8 of 10 in the 2019 FIA World Rallycross Championship
- Date: 31 August – 1 September 2019
- Location: Lohéac, Bretagne
- Venue: Circuit de Lohéac

Results
Heat winners
- Heat 1: (Finland) Toomas Heikkinen; GRX Set
- Heat 2: (Lithuania) Rokas Baciuška; GC Kompetition
- Heat 3: (Norway) Andreas Bakkerud; Monster Energy RX Cartel
- Heat 4: (Sweden) Timmy Hansen; Team Hansen MJP
Semi-final winners
- Semi-final 1: (Norway) Andreas Bakkerud; Monster Energy RX Cartel
- Semi-final 2: (Finland) Niclas Grönholm; GRX Taneco Team
Final
- First: (Sweden) Timmy Hansen; Team Hansen MJP
- Second: (Sweden) Anton Marklund; GC Kompetition
- Third: (Sweden) Kevin Hansen; Team Hansen MJP

World RX layout of Circuit de Lohéac

The 2019 Bretagne World RX of France was the eighth round of the sixth season of the FIA World Rallycross Championship. The event was held at the Circuit de Lohéac in the Lohéac commune of Bretagne.

== Supercar ==
=== Heats ===
| Pos. | No. | Driver | Team | Car | Q1 | Q2 | Q3 | Q4 | Pts |
|---|---|---|---|---|---|---|---|---|---|
| 1 | 21 | (Sweden) Timmy Hansen | Team Hansen MJP | Peugeot 208 | 2nd | 8th | 6th | 1st | 16 |
| 2 | 14 | (Lithuania) Rokas Baciuška | GC Kompetition | Renault Mégane R.S. | 5th | 1st | 17th | 2nd | 15 |
| 3 | 13 | (Norway) Andreas Bakkerud | Monster Energy RX Cartel | Audi S1 | 9th | 3rd | 1st | 11th | 14 |
| 4 | 68 | (Finland) Niclas Grönholm | GRX Taneco Team | Hyundai i20 | 6th | 5th | 3rd | 4th | 13 |
| 5 | 57 | (Finland) Toomas Heikkinen | GRX Set | Hyundai i20 | 1st | 6th | 11th | 7th | 12 |
| 6 | 44 | (Germany) Timo Scheider | ALL-INKL.COM Münnich Motorsport | SEAT Ibiza | 3rd | 2nd | 16th | 5th | 11 |
| 7 | 92 | (Sweden) Anton Marklund | GC Kompetition | Renault Mégane R.S. | 13th | 9th | 2nd | 8th | 10 |
| 8 | 33 | (United Kingdom) Liam Doran | Monster Energy RX Cartel | Audi S1 | 17th | 4th | 7th | 3rd | 9 |
| 9 | 6 | (Latvia) Jānis Baumanis | Team STARD | Ford Fiesta MK8 | 7th | 11th | 8th | 6th | 8 |
| 10 | 71 | (Sweden) Kevin Hansen | Team Hansen MJP | Peugeot 208 | 10th | 12th | 4th | 10th | 7 |
| 11 | 123 | (Hungary) Krisztián Szabó | EKS Sport | Audi S1 | 8th | 14th | 5th | 12th | 6 |
| 12 | 7 | (Russia) Timur Timerzyanov | GRX Taneco Team | Hyundai i20 | 4th | 10th | 10th | 19th | 5 |
| 13 | 36 | (France) Guerlain Chicherit | GC Kompetition | Renault Mégane R.S. | 18th | 7th | 14th | 9th | 4 |
| 14 | 20 | (France) Fabien Pailler | Fabien Pailler | Peugeot 208 | 11th | 13th | 12th | 13th | 3 |
| 15 | 113 | (France) Cyril Raymond | GCK Academy | Renault Clio R.S. | 12th | 20th | 9th | 14th | 2 |
| 16 | 96 | (Belgium) Guillaume De Ridder | GCK Academy | Renault Clio R.S. | 14th | 16th | 19th | 15th | 1 |
| 17 | 3 | (Finland) Jani Paasonen | Team Stard | Ford Fiesta MK8 | 19th | 17th | 13th | 17th | |
| 18 | 18 | (France) Jonathan Pailler | Jonathan Pailler | Peugeot 208 | 16th | 15th | 21st | 16th | |
| 19 | 42 | (United Kingdom) Oliver Bennett | Oliver Bennett | Mini Cooper | 15th | 21st | 15th | 21st | |
| 20 | 12 | (Russia) Matvey Furazhkin | ES Motorsport-Labas GAS | Škoda Fabia | 20th | 18th | 20th | 18th | |
| 21 | 84 | (France) Hervé "Knapick" Lemonnier | "Knapick" | Citroën DS3 | 21st | 19th | 18th | 20th | |

=== Semi-finals ===
Semi-Final 1

| Pos. | No. | Driver | Team | Time | Pts |
|---|---|---|---|---|---|
| 1 | 13 | (Norway) Andreas Bakkerud | Monster Energy RX Cartel | 3:42.347 | 6 |
| 2 | 21 | (Sweden) Timmy Hansen | Team Hansen MJP | + 0.668 | 5 |
| 3 | 92 | (Sweden) Anton Marklund | GC Kompetition | + 1.213 | 4 |
| 4 | 57 | (Finland) Toomas Heikkinen | GRX Set | + 2.993 | 3 |
| 5 | 123 | (Hungary) Krisztián Szabó | EKS Sport | + 4.998 | 2 |
| 6 | 6 | (Latvia) Jānis Baumanis | Team STARD | + 5.310 | 1 |

Semi-Final 2

| Pos. | No. | Driver | Team | Time | Pts |
|---|---|---|---|---|---|
| 1 | 68 | (Finland) Niclas Grönholm | GRX Taneco Team | 3:41.930 | 6 |
| 2 | 14 | (Lithuania) Rokas Baciuška | GC Kompetition | + 2.687 | 5 |
| 3 | 71 | (Sweden) Kevin Hansen | Team Hansen MJP | + 4.509 | 4 |
| 4 | 44 | (Germany) Timo Scheider | ALL-INKL.COM Münnich Motorsport | + 4.966 | 3 |
| 5 | 7 | (Russia) Timur Timerzyanov | GRX Taneco Team | + 5.195 | 2 |
| 6 | 33 | (United Kingdom) Liam Doran | Monster Energy RX Cartel | + 5.678 | 1 |

=== Final ===
| Pos. | No. | Driver | Team | Time | Pts |
|---|---|---|---|---|---|
| 1 | 21 | (Sweden) Timmy Hansen | Team Hansen MJP | 3:43.959 | 8 |
| 2 | 92 | (Sweden) Anton Marklund | GC Kompetition | + 1.459 | 5 |
| 3 | 71 | (Sweden) Kevin Hansen | Team Hansen MJP | + 2.289 | 4 |
| 4 | 14 | (Lithuania) Rokas Baciuška | GC Kompetition | + 2.889 | 3 |
| 5 | 13 | (Norway) Andreas Bakkerud | Monster Energy RX Cartel | + 3.539 | 2 |
| 6 | 68 | (Finland) Niclas Grönholm | GRX Taneco Team | + 3.723 | 1 |

== Standings after the event ==
| Pos. | Driver | Pts | Gap |
|---|---|---|---|
| 1 | (Norway) Andreas Bakkerud | 160 | |
| 2 | (Sweden) Timmy Hansen | 158 | +2 |
| 3 | (Sweden) Kevin Hansen | 158 | +2 |
| 4 | (Finland) Niclas Grönholm | 135 | +25 |
| 5 | (Latvia) Janis Baumanis | 120 | +40 |
| 6 | (Russia) Timur Timerzyanov | 109 | +51 |

- Note: Only the top six positions are included.

| Previous race: 2019 World RX of Canada | FIA World Rallycross Championship; 2019 season | Next race: 2019 World RX of Latvia |
| Previous race: 2018 World RX of France | World RX of France | Next race: 2021 World RX of France |
