= 2019 World RX of Latvia =

Rallycross series held in Latvia

- Round 9 of 10 in the 2019 FIA World Rallycross Championship
- Date: 14–15 September 2019
- Location: Riga, Latvia
- Venue: Biķernieku Kompleksā Sporta Bāze

Results
Heat winners
- Heat 1: (Lithuania) Rokas Baciuska; GC Kompetition
- Heat 2: (Finland) Niclas Grönholm; GRX Taneco Team
- Heat 3: (Sweden) Timmy Hansen; Team Hansen MJP
- Heat 4: (Sweden) Timmy Hansen; Team Hansen MJP
Semi-final winners
- Semi-final 1: (Norway) Andreas Bakkerud; Monster Energy RX Cartel
- Semi-final 2: (Sweden) Timmy Hansen; Team Hansen MJP
Final
- First: (Sweden) Timmy Hansen; Team Hansen MJP
- Second: (Finland) Niclas Grönholm; GRX Taneco Team
- Third: (Norway) Andreas Bakkerud; Monster Energy RX Cartel

World RX layout of Biķernieku Kompleksā Sporta Bāze

The 2019 Neste World RX of Latvia was the ninth round of the sixth season of the FIA World Rallycross Championship. The event was held at Biķernieku Kompleksā Sporta Bāze, in the Latvian capital of Riga.

== Supercar ==
=== Heats ===
Pos.	No.	Driver	Team	Car	Q1	Q2	Q3	Q4	Pts
1	13	(Norway) Andreas Bakkerud	Monster Energy RX Cartel	Audi S1	2nd	6th	5th	3rd	16
2	21	(Sweden) Timmy Hansen	Team Hansen MJP	Peugeot 208	7th	17th	1st	1st	15
3	14	(Lithuania) Rokas Baciuska	GC Kompetition	Renault Mégane RS	1st	4th	15th	7th	14
4	71	(Sweden) Kevin Hansen	Team Hansen MJP	Peugeot 208	3rd	7th	10th	5th	13
5	68	(Finland) Niclas Grönholm	GRX Taneco Team	Hyundai i20	9th	1st	14th	9th	12
6	15	(Latvia) Reinis Nitiss	GRX Set	Hyundai i20	15th	8th	2nd	8th	11
7	92	(Sweden) Anton Marklund	GC Kompetition	Renault Mégane RS	5th	2nd	12th	14th	10
8	123	(Hungary) Kristian Szabo	EKS Sport	Audi S1	10th	15th	4th	6th	9
9	33	(United Kingdom) Liam Doran	Monster Energy RX Cartel	Audi S1	8th	3rd	11th	15th	8
10	7	(Russia) Timur Timerzyanov	GRX Taneco Team	Hyundai i20	19th	5th	8th	4th	7
11	44	(Germany) Timo Scheider	ALL-INKL.COM Münnich Motorsport	Seat Ibiza	11th	9th	19th	2nd	6
12	6	(Latvia) Janis Baumanis	Team STARD	Ford Fiesta	16th	11th	6th	12th	5
13	113	(France) Cyril Raymond	GCK Academy	Renault Clio RS	12th	10th	9th	17th	4
14	96	(Belgium) Guillaume De Ridder	GCK Academy	Renault Clio RS	14th	12th	13th	11th	3
15	36	(France) Guerlain Chicherit	GC Kompetition	Renault Mégane RS	4th	DQ	3rd	10th	2
16	42	(United Kingdom) Oliver Bennett	Oliver Bennett	Mini Cooper	13th	16th	17th	16th	1
17	12	(Russia) Matvey Furazhkin	ES Motorsport - Labas GAS	Skoda Fabia	17th	13th	16th	18th	
18	4	(Sweden) Robin Larsson	JC Raceteknik	Audi S1	6th	DQ	7th	13th	
19	5	(Norway) Pal Try	Team STARD	Ford Fiesta	18th	14th	18th	19th	

=== Semi-finals ===
Semi-Final 1

Pos.	No.	Driver	Team	Time	Pts
1	13	(Norway) Andreas Bakkerud	Monster Energy RX Cartel	5:25.994	6
2	68	(Finland) Niclas Grönholm	GRX Taneco Team	+1.787	5
3	33	(United Kingdom) Liam Doran	Monster Energy RX Cartel	+2.769	4
4	92	(Sweden) Anton Marklund	GC Kompetition	+3.010	3
5	14	(Lithuania) Rokas Baciuska	GC Kompetition	+1:02.094	2
6	44	(Germany) Timo Scheider	ALL-INKL.COM Münnich Motorsport	+5.701	1

Semi-Final 2

Pos.	No.	Driver	Team	Time	Pts
1	21	(Sweden) Timmy Hansen	Team Hansen MJP	5:22.842	6
2	71	(Sweden) Kevin Hansen	Team Hansen MJP	+0.456	5
3	7	(Russia) Timur Timerzyanov	GRX Taneco Team	+1.776	4
4	15	(Latvia) Reinis Nitiss	GRX Set	+3.126	3
5	123	(Hungary) Kristian Szabo	EKS Sport	+3.536	2
6	6	(Latvia) Janis Baumanis	Team STARD	+7.157	1

=== Final ===
Pos.	No.	Driver	Team	Time	Pts
1	21	(Sweden) Timmy Hansen	Team Hansen MJP	5:20.070	8
2	68	(Finland) Niclas Grönholm	GRX Taneco Team	+2.297	5
3	13	(Norway) Andreas Bakkerud	Monster Energy RX Cartel	+2.670	4
4	71	(Sweden) Kevin Hansen	Team Hansen MJP	+6.055	3
5	7	(Russia) Timur Timerzyanov	GRX Taneco Team	+8.773	2
6	33	(United Kingdom) Liam Doran	Monster Energy RX Cartel	+24.540	1

== Standings after the event ==
Pos.	Driver	Pts	Gap
1	(Sweden) Timmy Hansen	187	
2	(Norway) Andreas Bakkerud	186	+1
3	(Sweden) Kevin Hansen	179	+8
4	(Finland) Niclas Grönholm	157	+30
5	(Latvia) Janis Baumanis	126	+61
6	(Russia) Timur Timerzyanov	122	+65

- Note: Only the top six positions are included.

Previous race: 2019 World RX of France	FIA World Rallycross Championship; 2019 season	Next race: 2019 World RX of South Africa
Previous race: 2018 World RX of Latvia	World RX of Latvia	Next race: 2020 World RX of Latvia
