= 2019 World RX of Abu Dhabi =

Rallycross championship event

- Round 1 of 10 in the 2019 FIA World Rallycross Championship
- Date: 5-6 April 2019
- Location: Yas Island, Abu Dhabi
- Venue: Yas Marina Circuit

Results
Heat winners
- Heat 1: (Sweden) Timmy Hansen; Team Hansen MJP
- Heat 2: (Sweden) Timmy Hansen; Team Hansen MJP
- Heat 3: (Sweden) Kevin Hansen; Team Hansen MJP
- Heat 4: (Sweden) Kevin Hansen; Team Hansen MJP
Semi-final winners
- Semi-final 1: (Sweden) Kevin Hansen; Team Hansen MJP
- Semi-final 2: (Finland) Niclas Grönholm; GRX Taneco
Final
- First: (Sweden) Kevin Hansen; Team Hansen MJP
- Second: (Finland) Niclas Grönholm; GRX Taneco
- Third: (United Kingdom) Liam Doran; Monster Energy RX Cartel

Rallycross layout of the Yas Marina Circuit

The 2019 World RX of Abu Dhabi was the first round of the sixth season of the FIA World Rallycross Championship. The event was held at the Yas Marina Circuit in Yas Island, Abu Dhabi, United Arab Emirates.

== Supercar ==
=== Heats ===
Pos.	No.	Driver	Team	Car	Q1	Q2	Q3	Q4	Pts
1	71	(Sweden) Kevin Hansen	Team Hansen MJP	Peugeot 208	2nd	6th	1st	1st	16
2	68	(Finland) Niclas Grönholm	GRX Taneco Team	Hyundai i20	3rd	4th	8th	5th	15
3	44	(Germany) Timo Scheider	ALL-INKL.COM Münnich Motorsport	Seat Ibiza	4th	11th	6th	2nd	14
4	6	(Latvia) Janis Baumanis	Team Stard	Ford Fiesta	8th	8th	3rd	4th	13
5	92	(Sweden) Anton Marklund	GC Kompetition	Renault Mégane RS	6th	5th	12th	3rd	12
6	123	(Hungary) Krisztián Szabó	EKS Sport	Audi S1	10th	10th	2nd	6th	11
7	7	(Russia) Timur Timerzyanov	GRX Taneco Team	Hyundai i20	7th	12th	4th	8th	10
8	14	(Lithuania) Rokas Baciuska	ES Motorsport - Labas GAS	Škoda Fabia	11th	7th	5th	9th	9
9	21	(Sweden) Timmy Hansen	Team Hansen MJP	Peugeot 208	1st	1st	7th	DNS	8
10	36	(France) Guerlain Chicherit	GC Kompetition	Renault Mégane RS	9th	9th	14th	10th	7
11	33	(United Kingdom) Liam Doran	Monster Energy RX Cartel	Audi S1	12th	13th	9th	14th	6
12	113	(France) Cyril Raymond	GCK Academy	Renault Clio RS	15th	14th	10th	7th	5
13	15	(Latvia) Reinis Nitišs	GRX Set	Hyundai i20	14th	3rd	15th	15th	4
14	5	(Norway) Pal Try	Team Stard	Ford Fiesta	16th	15th	13th	12th	3
15	13	(Norway) Andreas Bakkerud	Monster Energy RX Cartel	Audi S1	5th	2nd	DQ	13th	2
16	96	(Belgium) Guillaume De Ridder	GCK Academy	Renault Clio RS	DNS	16th	11th	11th	1
17	42	(United Kingdom) Oliver Bennett	Oliver Bennett	Mini Cooper	13th	DNS	16th	DNS	

- Note: Timmy Hansen was forced to withdraw from the event following damage sustained to his roll cage in his Q3 crash with Bakkerud.

=== Semi-final 1 ===
Pos.	No.	Driver	Team	Time	Pts
1	71	(Sweden) Kevin Hansen	Team Hansen MJP	4:35.450	6
2	44	(Germany) Timo Scheider	ALL-INKL.COM Münnich Motorsport	+1.220	5
3	33	(United Kingdom) Liam Doran	Monster Energy RX Cartel	+5.429	4
4	7	(Russia) Timur Timerzyanov	GRX Taneco Team	+6.135	3
5	92	(Sweden) Anton Marklund	GC Kompetition	+8.667	2
6	15	(Latvia) Reinis Nitišs	GRX Set	DNF	1

=== Semi-final 2 ===
Pos.	No.	Driver	Team	Time	Pts
1	68	(Finland) Niclas Grönholm	GRX Taneco Team	4:41.734	6
2	6	(Latvia) Janis Baumanis	Team Stard	+0.409	5
3	123	(Hungary) Krisztián Szabó	EKS Sport	+1.031	4
4	36	(France) Guerlain Chicherit	GC Kompetition	+4.116	3
5	113	(France) Cyril Raymond	GCK Academy	+1:00.002	2
6	14	(Lithuania) Rokas Baciuska	ES Motorsport - Labas GAS	+1 lap	1

=== Final ===
Pos.	No.	Driver	Team	Time	Pts
1	71	(Sweden) Kevin Hansen	Team Hansen MJP	4:39.467	8
2	68	(Finland) Niclas Grönholm	GRX Taneco Team	+0.479	5
3	33	(United Kingdom) Liam Doran	Monster Energy RX Cartel	+0.728	4
4	123	(Hungary) Krisztián Szabó	EKS Sport	+8.650	3
5	6	(Latvia) Janis Baumanis	Team Stard	+12.227	2
6	44	(Germany) Timo Scheider	ALL-INKL.COM Münnich Motorsport	+29.617	1

- Note: Niclas Grönholm originally won the event but later inherits the victory, awarded a 3-second penalty for "pushing and overtaking".

== Standings after the event ==
Pos.	Driver	Pts	Gap
1	(Sweden) Kevin Hansen	30	
2	(Finland) Niclas Grönholm	26	+4
3	(Latvia) Janis Baumanis	20	+10
	(Germany) Timo Scheider	20	+10
5	(Hungary) Krisztián Szabó	18	+12

- Note: Only the top five positions are included.

Previous race: 2018 World RX of South Africa	FIA World Rallycross Championship; 2019 season	Next race: 2019 World RX of Catalunya
Previous race: -	World RX of Abu Dhabi	Next race: -
