= 2019 World RX of Catalunya =

Rallycross championship event

- Round 2 of 10 in the 2019 FIA World Rallycross Championship
- Date: 27-28 April 2019
- Location: Montmeló, Catalonia
- Venue: Circuit de Barcelona-Catalunya

Results
Heat winners
- Heat 1: (Sweden) Timmy Hansen; Team Hansen MJP
- Heat 2: (Sweden) Timmy Hansen; Team Hansen MJP
- Heat 3: (Sweden) Timmy Hansen; Team Hansen MJP
- Heat 4: (Sweden) Timmy Hansen; Team Hansen MJP
Semi-final winners
- Semi-final 1: (Sweden) Timmy Hansen; Team Hansen MJP
- Semi-final 2: (Sweden) Kevin Hansen; Team Hansen MJP
Final
- First: (Sweden) Timmy Hansen; Team Hansen MJP
- Second: (Sweden) Kevin Hansen; Team Hansen MJP
- Third: (Norway) Andreas Bakkerud; Monster Energy RX Cartel

Rallycross layout of the Circuit de Catalunya

The 2019 World RX of Catalunya-Barcelona was the second round of the sixth season of the FIA World Rallycross Championship. The event was held at the Circuit de Barcelona-Catalunya in Montmeló, Catalonia.

== Supercar ==
=== Heats ===
Pos.	No.	Driver	Team	Car	Q1	Q2	Q3	Q4	Pts
1	21	(Sweden) Timmy Hansen	Team Hansen MJP	Peugeot 208	1st	1st	1st	1st	16
2	71	(Sweden) Kevin Hansen	Team Hansen MJP	Peugeot 208	2nd	2nd	5th	4th	15
3	68	(Finland) Niclas Grönholm	GRX Taneco Team	Hyundai i20	6th	11th	2nd	2nd	14
4	13	(Norway) Andreas Bakkerud	Monster Energy RX Cartel	Audi S1	5th	5th	4th	3rd	13
5	7	(Russia) Timur Timerzyanov	GRX Taneco Team	Hyundai i20	3rd	3rd	10th	8th	12
6	6	(Latvia) Janis Baumanis	Team Stard	Ford Fiesta	7th	8th	7th	6th	11
7	113	(France) Cyril Raymond	GCK Academy	Renault Clio RS	8th	6th	13th	7th	10
8	123	(Hungary) Krisztián Szabó	EKS Sport	Audi S1	9th	4th	8th	14th	9
9	36	(France) Guerlain Chicherit	GC Kompetition	Renault Mégane RS	4th	12th	9th	13th	8
10	33	(United Kingdom) Liam Doran	Monster Energy RX Cartel	Audi S1	10th	13th	6th	11th	7
11	96	(Belgium) Guillaume De Ridder	GCK Academy	Renault Clio RS	14th	15th	11th	5th	6
12	44	(Germany) Timo Scheider	ALL-INKL.COM Münnich Motorsport	Seat Ibiza	11th	7th	17th	10th	5
13	14	(Lithuania) Rokas Baciuska	ES Motorsport - Labas GAS	Škoda Fabia	12th	9th	12th	12th	4
14	92	(Sweden) Anton Marklund	GC Kompetition	Renault Mégane RS	DNS	10th	3rd	9th	3
15	41	(United Kingdom) Chris Hoy	Chris Hoy	Ford Fiesta	16th	17th	16th	16th	2
16	3	(Finland) Jani Paasonen	Team Stard	Ford Fiesta	15th	18th	15th	17th	1
17	42	(United Kingdom) Oliver Bennett	Oliver Bennett	Mini Cooper	17th	16th	18th	15th	
18	73	(Hungary) Tamás Kárai	Kárai Motorsport Sportegyesület	Audi A1	13th	14th	14th	DQ	
19	84	(France) "Knapick"	"Knapick"	Citroën DS3	18th	DNS	DNS	DNS	

=== Semi-finals ===
Semi-Final 1

Pos.	No.	Driver	Team	Time	Pts
1	21	(Sweden) Timmy Hansen	Team Hansen MJP	4:33.348	6
2	68	(Finland) Niclas Grönholm	GRX Taneco Team	+2.138	5
3	113	(France) Cyril Raymond	GCK Academy	+4.854	4
4	7	(Russia) Timur Timerzyanov	GRX Taneco Team	+5.720	3
5	36	(France) Guerlain Chicherit	GC Kompetition	+6.000	2
6	96	(Belgium) Guillaume De Ridder	GCK Academy	+6.492	1

Semi-Final 2

Pos.	No.	Driver	Team	Time	Pts
1	71	(Sweden) Kevin Hansen	Team Hansen MJP	4:33.161	6
2	13	(Norway) Andreas Bakkerud	Monster Energy RX Cartel	+2.525	5
3	6	(Latvia) Janis Baumanis	Team Stard	+4.854	4
4	33	(United Kingdom) Liam Doran	Monster Energy RX Cartel	+5.994	3
5	44	(Germany) Timo Scheider	ALL-INKL.COM Münnich Motorsport	+6.363	2
6	123	(Hungary) Krisztián Szabó	EKS Sport	+12.805	1

=== Final ===
Pos.	No.	Driver	Team	Time	Pts
1	21	(Sweden) Timmy Hansen	Team Hansen MJP	4:31.584	8
2	71	(Sweden) Kevin Hansen	Team Hansen MJP	+2.783	5
3	13	(Norway) Andreas Bakkerud	Monster Energy RX Cartel	+3.398	4
4	68	(Finland) Niclas Grönholm	GRX Taneco Team	+4.101	3
5	113	(France) Cyril Raymond	GCK Academy	+6.612	2
6	6	(Latvia) Janis Baumanis	Team Stard	+7.511	1

== Standings after the event ==
Pos.	Driver	Pts	Gap
1	(Sweden) Kevin Hansen	56	
2	(Finland) Niclas Grönholm	48	+8
3	(Sweden) Timmy Hansen	38	+18
4	(Latvia) Janis Baumanis	36	+20
5	(Hungary) Krisztián Szabó	28	+28
	(Russia) Timur Timerzyanov	28	+28

- Note: Only the top five positions are included.

Previous race: 2019 World RX of Abu Dhabi	FIA World Rallycross Championship; 2019 season	Next race: 2019 World RX of Belgium
Previous race: 2018 World RX of Barcelona	World RX of Catalunya	Next race: 2020 World RX of Catalunya
