= 2017 World RX of Germany =

Rallycross event

- Round 11 of 12 in the 2017 FIA World Rallycross Championship
- Date: 30 September–1 October 2017
- Location: Buxtehude, Lower Saxony
- Venue: Estering

Results
Heat winners
- Heat 1: (Sweden) Mattias Ekström; EKS RX
- Heat 2: (Sweden) Timmy Hansen; Team Peugeot-Hansen
- Heat 3: (Norway) Petter Solberg; PSRX Volkswagen Sweden
- Heat 4: (Norway) Petter Solberg; PSRX Volkswagen Sweden
Semi-final winners
- Semi-final 1: (Norway) Petter Solberg; PSRX Volkswagen Sweden
- Semi-final 2: (Sweden) Mattias Ekström; EKS RX
Final
- First: (Sweden) Mattias Ekström; EKS RX
- Second: (Sweden) Timmy Hansen; Team Peugeot-Hansen
- Third: (Finland) Toomas Heikkinen; EKS RX

World RX layout of Estering

The 2017 World RX of Germany was the eleventh round of the fourth season of the FIA World Rallycross Championship. The event was held at the Estering in Buxtehude, Lower Saxony.

== Heats ==
Pos.	No.	Driver	Team	Car	Q1	Q2	Q3	Q4	Pts
1	11	(Norway) Petter Solberg	PSRX Volkswagen Sweden	Volkswagen Polo GTI	5th	3rd	1st	1st	16
2	1	(Sweden) Mattias Ekström	EKS RX	Audi S1	1st	2nd	2nd	8th	15
3	21	(Sweden) Timmy Hansen	Team Peugeot-Hansen	Peugeot 208	7th	1st	5th	9th	14
4	3	(Sweden) Johan Kristoffersson	PSRX Volkswagen Sweden	Volkswagen Polo GTI	8th	4th	4th	3rd	13
5	13	(Norway) Andreas Bakkerud	Hoonigan Racing Division	Ford Focus RS	2nd	12th	3rd	5th	12
6	57	(Finland) Toomas Heikkinen	EKS RX	Audi S1	4th	10th	9th	10th	11
7	71	(Sweden) Kevin Hansen	Team Peugeot-Hansen	Peugeot 208	6th	6th	7th	13th	10
8	96	(Sweden) Kevin Eriksson	MJP Racing Team Austria	Ford Fiesta	10th	9th	12th	4th	9
9	6	(Latvia) Jānis Baumanis	STARD	Ford Fiesta	17th	5th	10th	6th	8
10	9	(France) Sébastien Loeb	Team Peugeot-Hansen	Peugeot 208	18th	7th	6th	7th	7
11	15	(Latvia) Reinis Nitišs	EKS RX	Audi S1	9th	11th	11th	11th	6
12	68	(Finland) Niclas Grönholm	GRX	Ford Fiesta	19th	21st	8th	2nd	5
13	93	(Sweden) Sebastian Eriksson	Olsbergs MSE	Ford Fiesta ST	3rd	13th	18th	14th	4
14	43	(United States) Ken Block	Hoonigan Racing Division	Ford Focus RS	13th	8th	13th	15th	3
15	44	(Germany) Timo Scheider	MJP Racing Team Austria	Ford Fiesta	14th	17th	15th	12th	2
16	94	(Germany) Dieter Depping	PSRX Volkswagen Sweden	Volkswagen Polo GTI	15th	16th	14th	18th	1
17	7	(Russia) Timur Timerzyanov	STARD	Ford Fiesta	11th	15th	16th	DNF	
18	17	(France) Davy Jeanney	DA Racing	Peugeot 208	12th	22nd	17th	16th	
19	77	(Germany) René Münnich	All-Inkl.com Münnich Motorsport	Seat Ibiza	20th	14th	19th	17th	
20	10	(Hungary) "Csucsu"	Speedy Motorsport	Kia Rio	16th	18th	DNF	19th	
21	80	(Germany) Andreas Steffen	Andreas Steffen	Ford Fiesta	22nd	20th	20th	20th	
22	69	(Poland) Martin Kaczmarski	Martin Kaczmarski	Ford Fiesta	21st	19th	DNS	21st	

== Semi-finals ==
=== Semi-final 1 ===
Pos.	No.	Driver	Team	Time	Pts
1	11	(Norway) Petter Solberg	PSRX Volkswagen Sweden	03:45.054	6
2	57	(Finland) Toomas Heikkinen	EKS RX	+2.378	5
3	21	(Sweden) Timmy Hansen	Team Peugeot-Hansen	+3.638	4
4	6	(Latvia) Jānis Baumanis	STARD	+3.887	3
5	13	(Norway) Andreas Bakkerud	Hoonigan Racing Division	+4.927	2
6	15	(Latvia) Reinis Nitišs	EKS RX	+9.850	1

=== Semi-final 2 ===
Pos.	No.	Driver	Team	Time	Pts
1	1	(Sweden) Mattias Ekström	EKS RX	03:42.822	6
2	71	(Sweden) Kevin Hansen	Team Peugeot-Hansen	+2.206	5
3	68	(Finland) Niclas Grönholm	GRX	+5.296	4
4	9	(France) Sébastien Loeb	Team Peugeot-Hansen	+5.555	3
5	3	(Sweden) Johan Kristoffersson	PSRX Volkswagen Sweden	+8.751	2
6	96	(Sweden) Kevin Eriksson	MJP Racing Team Austria	+20.052	1

== Final ==
Pos.	No.	Driver	Team	Time	Pts
1	1	(Sweden) Mattias Ekström	EKS RX	03:41.663	8
2	21	(Sweden) Timmy Hansen	Team Peugeot-Hansen	+2.629	5
3	57	(Finland) Toomas Heikkinen	EKS RX	+3.717	4
4	11	(Norway) Petter Solberg	PSRX Volkswagen Sweden	+6.868	3
5	68	(Finland) Niclas Grönholm	GRX	+8.089	2
6	71	(Sweden) Kevin Hansen	Team Peugeot-Hansen	+48.239	1

== Standings after the event ==
Pos	Driver	Pts	Gap
WC	(Sweden) Johan Kristoffersson	286	
2	(Norway) Petter Solberg	234	+52
3	(Sweden) Mattias Ekström	233	+53
4	(France) Sébastien Loeb	204	+82
5	(Norway) Andreas Bakkerud	179	+107

- Note: Only the top five positions are included.

Previous race: 2017 World RX of Latvia	FIA World Rallycross Championship; 2017 season	Next race: 2017 World RX of South Africa
Previous race: 2016 World RX of Germany	World RX of Germany	Next race: 2018 World RX of Germany
