= 2018 World RX of Belgium =

Rallycross event

- Round 3 of 12 in the 2018 FIA World Rallycross Championship
- Date: 11–13 May 2018
- Location: Mettet, Wallonia
- Venue: Circuit Jules Tacheny Mettet

Results
Heat winners
- Heat 1: (Norway) Petter Solberg; PSRX Volkswagen Sweden
- Heat 2: (Sweden) Mattias Ekström; EKS Audi Sport
- Heat 3: (Sweden) Timmy Hansen; Team Peugeot Total
- Heat 4: (Sweden) Mattias Ekström; EKS Audi Sport
Semi-final winners
- Semi-final 1: Johan Kristoffersson; PSRX Volkswagen Sweden
- Semi-final 2: (France) Sébastien Loeb; Team Peugeot Total
Final
- First: (France) Sébastien Loeb; Team Peugeot Total
- Second: (Norway) Petter Solberg; PSRX Volkswagen Sweden
- Third: (Sweden) Timmy Hansen; Team Peugeot Total

World RX layout of Circuit Jules Tacheny Mettet

The 2018 World RX of Belgium was the third round of the fifth season of the FIA World Rallycross Championship. The event was held at the Circuit Jules Tacheny Mettet in Mettet, Wallonia.

== Qualifying ==
Pos.	No.	Driver	Team	Car	Q1	Q2	Q3	Q4	Pts
1	5	(Sweden) Mattias Ekström	EKS Audi Sport	Audi S1	6th	1st	7th	1st	16
2	21	(Sweden) Timmy Hansen	Team Peugeot Total	Peugeot 208	3rd	2nd	1st	7th	15
3	1	(Sweden) Johan Kristoffersson	PSRX Volkswagen Sweden	Volkswagen Polo R	4th	5th	2nd	3rd	14
4	9	(France) Sébastien Loeb	Team Peugeot Total	Peugeot 208	2nd	4th	10th	2nd	13
5	11	(Norway) Petter Solberg	PSRX Volkswagen Sweden	Volkswagen Polo R	1st	3rd	11th	8th	12
6	13	(Norway) Andreas Bakkerud	EKS Audi Sport	Audi S1	7th	10th	4th	4th	11
7	4	(Sweden) Robin Larsson	Olsbergs MSE	Ford Fiesta	9th	9th	9th	5th	10
8	7	(Russia) Timur Timerzyanov	GRX Taneco Team	Hyundai i20	8th	11th	8th	6th	9
9	71	(Sweden) Kevin Hansen	Team Peugeot Total	Peugeot 208	5th	6th	15th	10th	8
10	6	(Latvia) Jānis Baumanis	STARD	Ford Fiesta	13th	14th	5th	9th	7
11	68	(Finland) Niclas Grönholm	GRX Taneco Team	Hyundai i20	15th	12th	3rd	13th	6
12	36	(France) Guerlain Chicherit	GC Kompetition	Renault Mégane RS	12th	7th	12th	12th	5
13	67	(Belgium) François Duval	Comtoyou Racing	Audi S1	14th	8th	13th	11th	4
14	74	(France) Jérôme Grosset-Janin	GC Kompetition	Renault Mégane RS	10th	15th	6th	15th	3
15	66	(France) Grégoire Demoustier	Sébastien Loeb Racing	Peugeot 208	16th	16th	14th	14th	2
16	96	(Sweden) Kevin Eriksson	Olsbergs MSE	Ford Fiesta	11th	13th	16th	16th	1

== Semi-finals ==
Semi-final 1

Pos.	No.	Driver	Team	Time/Retired	Pts
1	1	(Sweden) Johan Kristoffersson	PSRX Volkswagen Sweden	4:17.270	6
2	11	(Norway) Petter Solberg	PSRX Volkswagen Sweden	+2.198	5
3	5	(Sweden) Mattias Ekström	EKS Audi Sport	+3.524	4
4	68	(Finland) Niclas Grönholm	GRX Taneco Team	+6.366	3
5	71	(Sweden) Kevin Hansen	Team Peugeot Total	+7.128	2
6	4	(Sweden) Robin Larsson	Olsbergs MSE	DNF	1

Semi-final 2

Pos.	No.	Driver	Team	Time/Retired	Pts
1	9	(France) Sébastien Loeb	Team Peugeot Total	4:10.869	6
2	13	(Norway) Andreas Bakkerud	EKS Audi Sport	+6.464	5
3	21	(Sweden) Timmy Hansen	Team Peugeot Total	+6.795	4
4	6	(Latvia) Jānis Baumanis	STARD	+9.551	3
5	36	(France) Guerlain Chicherit	GC Kompetition	+10.714	2
6	7	(Russia) Timur Timerzyanov	GRX Taneco Team	+19.495	1

== Final ==
Pos.	No.	Driver	Team	Time/Retired	Pts
1	9	(France) Sébastien Loeb	Team Peugeot Total	4:05.108	8
2	11	(Norway) Petter Solberg	PSRX Volkswagen Sweden	+0.447	5
3	21	(Sweden) Timmy Hansen	Team Peugeot Total	+1.802	4
4	5	(Sweden) Mattias Ekström	EKS Audi Sport	+1.960	3
5	1	(Sweden) Johan Kristoffersson	PSRX Volkswagen Sweden	+2.095	2
6	13	(Norway) Andreas Bakkerud	EKS Audi Sport	+3.031	1

== Standings after the event ==
Pos	Driver	Pts	Gap
1	(Sweden) Johan Kristoffersson	75	
2	(Norway) Petter Solberg	66	+9
3	(France) Sébastien Loeb	65	+10
4	(Norway) Andreas Bakkerud	61	+14
5	(Sweden) Timmy Hansen	59	+16
5	(Sweden) Mattias Ekström	59	+16

- Note: Only the top five positions are included.

Previous race: 2018 World RX of Portugal	FIA World Rallycross Championship; 2018 season	Next race: 2018 World RX of Great Britain
Previous race: 2017 World RX of Belgium	World RX of Belgium	Next race: 2019 World RX of Benelux
