= 2019 World RX of South Africa =

Rallycross championship event

- Round 10 of 10 in the 2019 FIA World Rallycross Championship
- Date: 9-10 November 2019
- Location: Cape Town, South Africa
- Venue: Killarney Motor Racing Complex

Results
Heat winners
- Heat 1: (Sweden) Timmy Hansen; Team Hansen MJP
- Heat 2: (Finland) Niclas Grönholm; GRX Taneco Team
- Heat 3: (Sweden) Timmy Hansen; Team Hansen MJP
- Heat 4: (Finland) Niclas Grönholm; GRX Taneco Team
Semi-final winners
- Semi-final 1: (Norway) Andreas Bakkerud; Monster Energy RX Cartel
- Semi-final 2: (Sweden) Timmy Hansen; Team Hansen MJP
Final
- First: (Finland) Niclas Grönholm; GRX Taneco Team
- Second: (Norway) Andreas Bakkerud; Monster Energy RX Cartel
- Third: (Russia) Timur Timerzyanov; GRX Taneco Team

World RX layout of Killarney Motor Racing Complex

The 2019 World RX of South Africa was the tenth and final round of the sixth season of the FIA World Rallycross Championship. The event was held at the Killarney Motor Racing Complex in Cape Town, Western Cape.

== Supercar ==
=== Heats ===
Pos.	No.	Driver	Team	Car	Q1	Q2	Q3	Q4	Pts
1	68	(Finland) Niclas Grönholm	GRX Taneco Team	Hyundai i20	3rd	1st	4th	1st	16
2	21	(Sweden) Timmy Hansen	Team Hansen MJP	Peugeot 208	1st	9th	1st	2nd	15
3	13	(Norway) Andreas Bakkerud	Monster Energy RX Cartel	Audi S1	2nd	11th	2nd	3rd	14
4	71	(Sweden) Kevin Hansen	Team Hansen MJP	Peugeot 208	4th	6th	3rd	4th	13
5	7	(Russia) Timur Timerzyanov	GRX Taneco Team	Hyundai i20	6th	2nd	7th	9th	12
6	44	(Germany) Timo Scheider	ALL-INKL.COM Münnich Motorsport	SEAT Ibiza	5th	4th	10th	5th	11
7	6	(Latvia) Jānis Baumanis	Team STARD	Ford Fiesta MK8	11th	7th	6th	7th	10
8	36	(France) Guerlain Chicherit	GC Kompetition	Renault Mégane R.S.	9th	13th	5th	6th	9
9	123	(Hungary) Krisztián Szabó	EKS Sport	Audi S1	7th	10th	11th	8th	8
10	96	(Belgium) Guillaume De Ridder	GCK Academy	Renault Clio R.S.	13th	3rd	12th	10th	7
11	92	(Sweden) Anton Marklund	GC Kompetition	Renault Mégane R.S.	8th	5th	8th	16th	6
12	42	(United Kingdom) Oliver Bennett	Oliver Bennett	Mini Cooper	12th	12th	14th	13th	5
13	12	(Russia) Matvey Furazhkin	ES Motorsport - Labas Gas	Škoda Fabia	14th	14th	13th	15th	4
14	22	(Finland) Jere Kaliokoski	Team Stard	Ford Fiesta MK8	10th	8th	DQ	11th	3
15	113	(France) Cyril Raymond	GCK Academy	Renault Clio R.S.	15th	DQ	9th	14th	2
16	33	(United Kingdom) Liam Doran	Monster Energy RX Cartel	Audi S1	DNS	15th	DNS	12th	1

=== Semi-finals ===
Semi-Final 1

Pos.	No.	Driver	Team	Time	Pts
1	13	(Norway) Andreas Bakkerud	Monster Energy RX Cartel	4:16.920	6
2	68	(Finland) Niclas Grönholm	GRX Taneco Team	+ 0.160	5
3	7	(Russia) Timur Timerzyanov	GRX Taneco Team	+ 0.918	4
4	92	(Sweden) Anton Marklund	GC Kompetition	+ 2.508	3
5	123	(Hungary) Krisztián Szabó	EKS Sport	+ 6.164	2
6	6	(Latvia) Jānis Baumanis	Team STARD	DNF	1

Semi-Final 2

Pos.	No.	Driver	Team	Time	Pts
1	21	(Sweden) Timmy Hansen	Team Hansen MJP	4:15.079	6
2	71	(Sweden) Kevin Hansen	Team Hansen MJP	+ 1.195	5
3	44	(Germany) Timo Scheider	ALL-INKL.COM Münnich Motorsport	+ 4.755	4
4	36	(France) Guerlain Chicherit	GC Kompetition	+ 13.486	3
5	96	(Belgium) Guillaume De Ridder	GCK Academy	+ 16.521	2
6	42	(United Kingdom) Oliver Bennett	Oliver Bennett	DNF	1

=== Final ===
Pos.	No.	Driver	Team	Time	Pts
1	68	(Finland) Niclas Grönholm	GRX Taneco Team	4:13.323	8
2	13	(Norway) Andreas Bakkerud	Monster Energy RX Cartel	+ 2.308	5
3	7	(Russia) Timur Timerzyanov	GRX Taneco Team	+ 2.983	4
4	21	(Sweden) Timmy Hansen	Team Hansen MJP	+ 6.578	3
5	71	(Sweden) Kevin Hansen	Team Hansen MJP	+ 11.846	2
6	44	(Germany) Timo Scheider	ALL-INKL.COM Münnich Motorsport	DNF	1

== Standings after the event ==
Pos.	Driver	Pts	Gap
WC	(Sweden) Timmy Hansen	211	
2	(Norway) Andreas Bakkerud	211	
3	(Sweden) Kevin Hansen	199	+12
4	(Finland) Niclas Grönholm	186	+25
5	(Russia) Timur Timerzyanov	142	+69
6	(Latvia) Janis Baumanis	137	+74

- Note: Only the top six positions are included.

Previous race: 2019 World RX of Latvia	FIA World Rallycross Championship; 2019 season	Next race: 2020 World RX of Sweden
Previous race: 2018 World RX of South Africa	World RX of South Africa	Next race: none
