= 2017 World RX of South Africa =

Round of FIA World Rallycross Championship

- Round 12 of 12 in the 2017 FIA World Rallycross Championship
- Date: 11–12 November 2017
- Location: Cape Town, Western Cape
- Venue: Killarney Motor Racing Complex

Results
Heat winners
- Heat 1: (Sweden) Timmy Hansen; Team Peugeot-Hansen
- Heat 2: (Latvia) Jānis Baumanis; STARD
- Heat 3: Johan Kristoffersson; PSRX Volkswagen Sweden
- Heat 4: (Sweden) Timmy Hansen; Team Peugeot-Hansen
Semi-final winners
- Semi-final 1: Johan Kristoffersson; PSRX Volkswagen Sweden
- Semi-final 2: (Sweden) Timmy Hansen; Team Peugeot-Hansen
Final
- First: Johan Kristoffersson; PSRX Volkswagen Sweden
- Second: (Sweden) Timmy Hansen; Team Peugeot-Hansen
- Third: (Sweden) Mattias Ekström; EKS RX

World RX layout of Killarney Motor Racing Complex

The 2017 World RX of South Africa was the twelfth and final round of the fourth season of the FIA World Rallycross Championship. The event was held at the Killarney Motor Racing Complex in Cape Town, Western Cape.

== Supercar ==
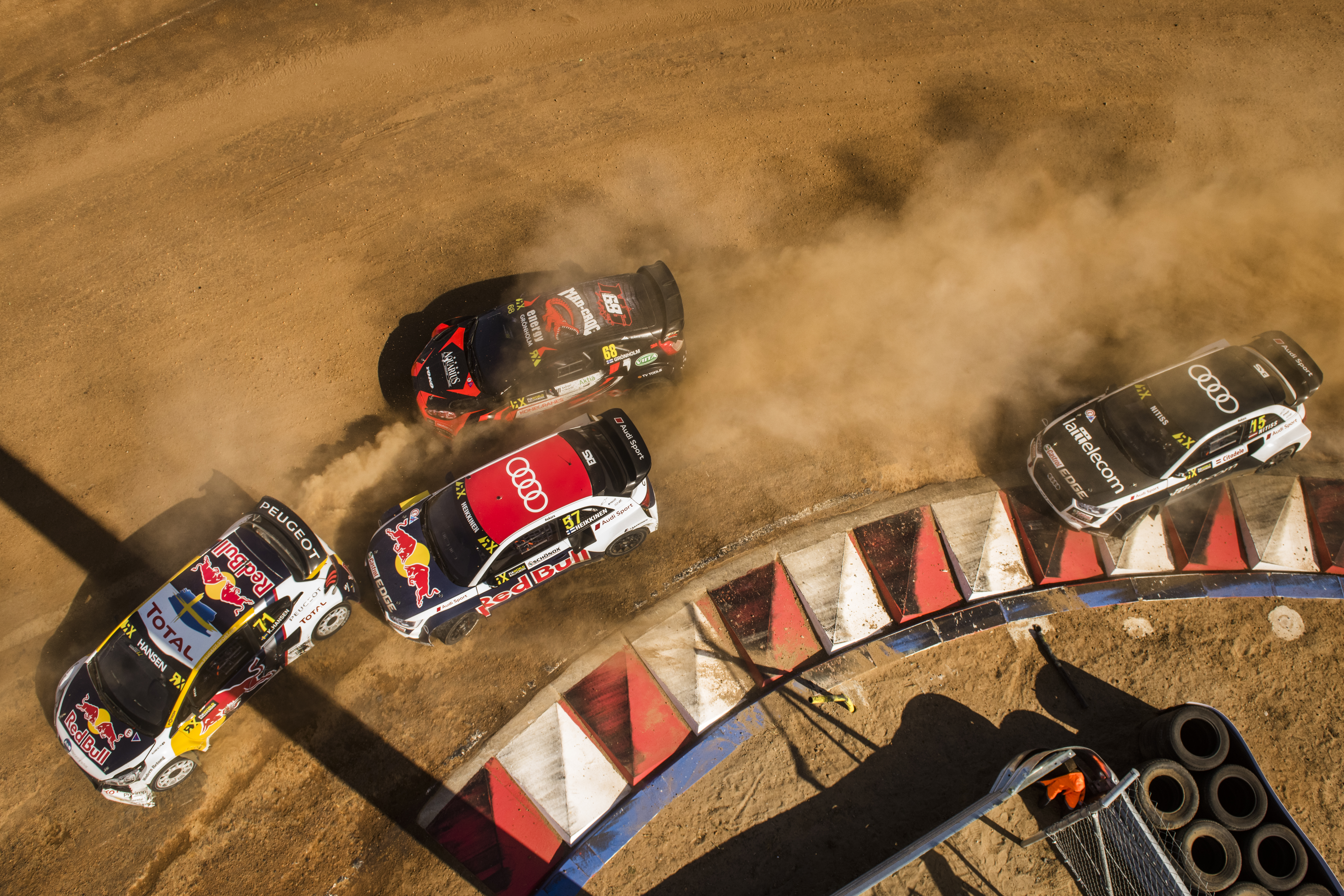
Kevin Hansen, Toomas Heikkinen, Niclas Grönholm and Reinis Nitišs.

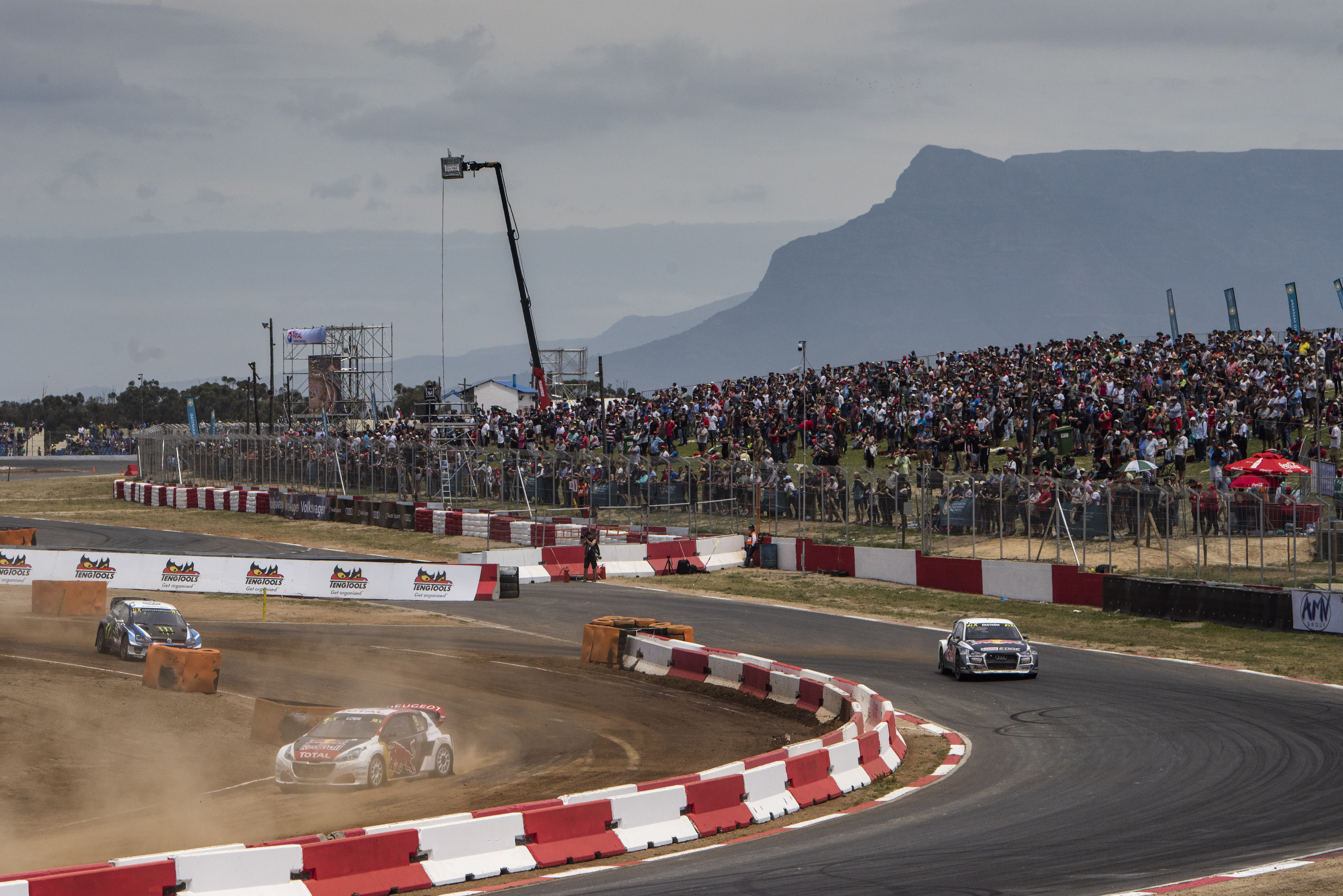
Sébastien Loeb leads Johan Kristoffersson whilst Mattias Ekström takes the Joker Lap

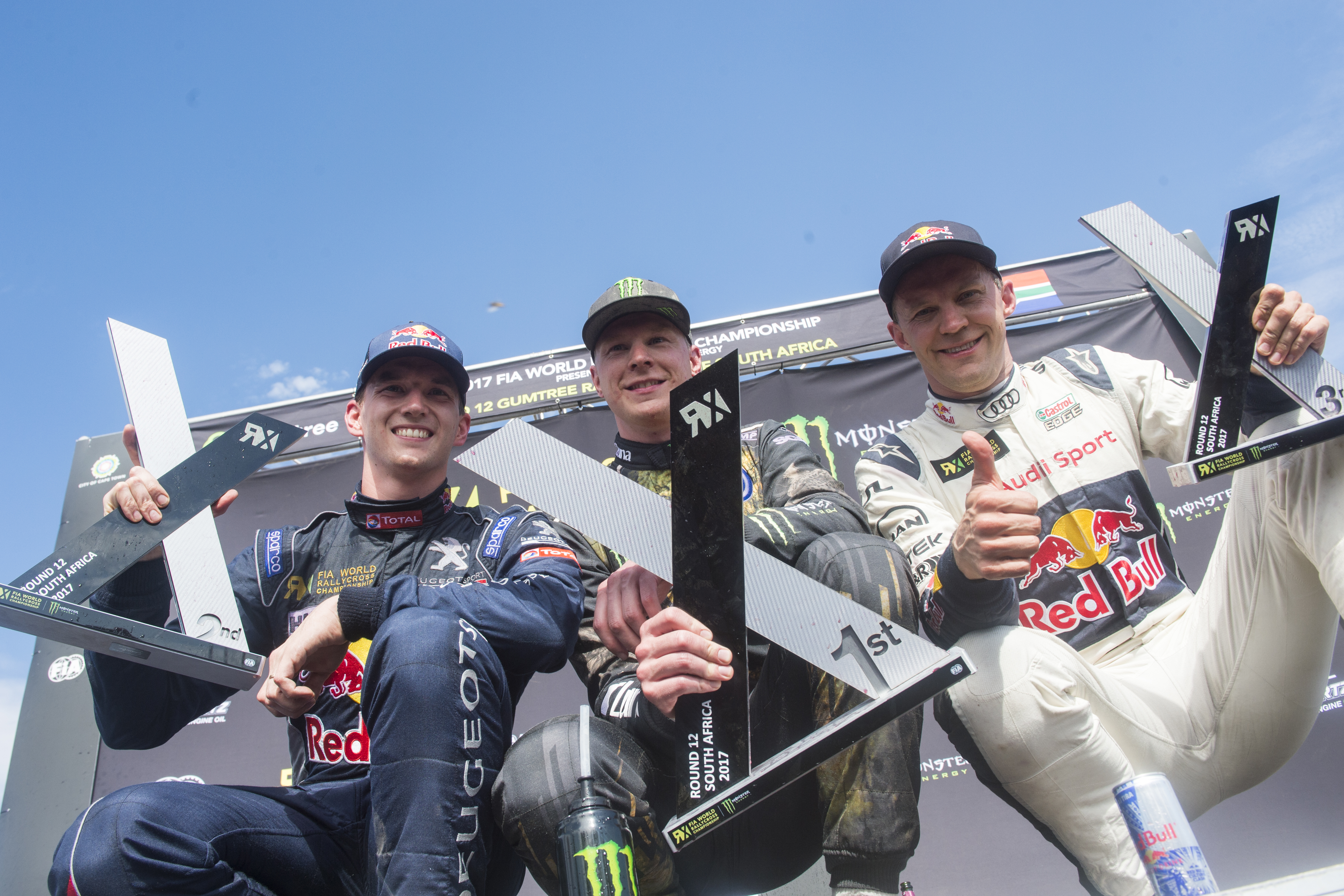
The event featured an all-Swedish podium, with Kristoffersson taking his seventh and final win of the 2017 season

=== Heats ===
| Pos. | No. | Driver | Team | Car | Q1 | Q2 | Q3 | Q4 | Pts |
|---|---|---|---|---|---|---|---|---|---|
| 1 | 3 | (Sweden) Johan Kristoffersson | PSRX Volkswagen Sweden | Volkswagen Polo GTI | 2nd | 9th | 1st | 2nd | 16 |
| 2 | 21 | (Sweden) Timmy Hansen | Team Peugeot-Hansen | Peugeot 208 | 1st | 14th | 3rd | 1st | 15 |
| 3 | 1 | (Sweden) Mattias Ekström | EKS RX | Audi S1 | 8th | 10th | 2nd | 8th | 14 |
| 4 | 44 | (Germany) Timo Scheider | MJP Racing Team Austria | Ford Fiesta | 6th | 11th | 6th | 4th | 13 |
| 5 | 13 | (Norway) Andreas Bakkerud | Hoonigan Racing Division | Ford Focus RS | 4th | 5th | 11th | 9th | 12 |
| 6 | 43 | (United States) Ken Block | Hoonigan Racing Division | Ford Focus RS | 5th | 2nd | 14th | 12th | 11 |
| 7 | 11 | (Norway) Petter Solberg | PSRX Volkswagen Sweden | Volkswagen Polo GTI | 3rd | 15th | 5th | 10th | 10 |
| 8 | 71 | (Sweden) Kevin Hansen | Team Peugeot-Hansen | Peugeot 208 | 14th | 3rd | 15th | 3rd | 9 |
| 9 | 6 | (Latvia) Jānis Baumanis | STARD | Ford Fiesta | 12th | 1st | 16th | 11th | 8 |
| 10 | 9 | (France) Sébastien Loeb | Team Peugeot-Hansen | Peugeot 208 | 7th | 18th | 4th | 5th | 7 |
| 11 | 57 | (Finland) Toomas Heikkinen | EKS RX | Audi S1 | 11th | 4th | 17th | 6th | 6 |
| 12 | 96 | (Sweden) Kevin Eriksson | MJP Racing Team Austria | Ford Fiesta | 10th | 17th | 8th | 7th | 5 |
| 13 | 7 | (Russia) Timur Timerzyanov | STARD | Ford Fiesta | 9th | 16th | 7th | 16th | 4 |
| 14 | 87 | (France) Jean-Baptiste Dubourg | DA Racing | Peugeot 208 | 17th | 7th | 12th | 15th | 3 |
| 15 | 68 | (Finland) Niclas Grönholm | GRX | Ford Fiesta | 15th | 12th | 13th | 13th | 2 |
| 16 | 98 | (Sweden) Oliver Eriksson | Olsbergs MSE | Ford Fiesta | 16th | 8th | 10th | 19th | 1 |
| 17 | 77 | (Germany) René Münnich | Münnich Motorsport | SEAT Ibiza | 21st | 6th | 18th | 14th | |
| 18 | 15 | (Latvia) Reinis Nitišs | EKS RX | Audi S1 | 13th | 20th | 9th | 18th | |
| 19 | 66 | (France) Grégoire Demoustier | DA Racing | Peugeot 208 | 19th | 13th | 21st | 21st | |
| 20 | 124 | (South Africa) Mark Cronje | Albatec Racing | Peugeot 208 | 18th | 21st | 20th | 17th | |
| 21 | 59 | (South Africa) Ashley Haigh-Smith | Olsbergs MSE | Ford Fiesta | 20th | 19th | 19th | 20th | |
| 22 | 10 | (Hungary) "Csucsu" | Speedy Motorsport | Kia Rio | 22nd | 22nd | 22nd | 22nd | |

=== Semi-finals ===
Semi-final 1

| Pos. | No. | Driver | Team | Time | Pts |
|---|---|---|---|---|---|
| 1 | 3 | (Sweden) Johan Kristoffersson | PSRX Volkswagen Sweden | 4:27.571 | 6 |
| 2 | 11 | (Norway) Petter Solberg | PSRX Volkswagen Sweden | +0.761 | 5 |
| 3 | 1 | (Sweden) Mattias Ekström | EKS RX | +0.723 | 4 |
| 4 | 13 | (Norway) Andreas Bakkerud | Hoonigan Racing Division | +1.446 | 3 |
| 5 | 6 | (Latvia) Jānis Baumanis | STARD | +3.139 | 2 |
| 6 | 57 | (Finland) Toomas Heikkinen | EKS RX | +4.261 | 1 |

Semi-final 2

| Pos. | No. | Driver | Team | Time | Pts |
|---|---|---|---|---|---|
| 1 | 21 | (Sweden) Timmy Hansen | Team Peugeot-Hansen | 4:26.464 | 6 |
| 2 | 44 | (Germany) Timo Scheider | MJP Racing Team Austria | +2.757 | 5 |
| 3 | 71 | (Sweden) Kevin Hansen | Team Peugeot-Hansen | +21.905 | 4 |
| 4 | 9 | (France) Sébastien Loeb | Team Peugeot-Hansen | +25.118 | 3 |
| 5 | 68 | (Sweden) Kevin Eriksson | MJP Racing Team Austria | +32.118 | 2 |
| 6 | 43 | (United States) Ken Block | Hoonigan Racing Division | DSQ | |

=== Final ===
| Pos. | No. | Driver | Team | Time | Pts |
|---|---|---|---|---|---|
| 1 | 3 | (Sweden) Johan Kristoffersson | PSRX Volkswagen Sweden | 4:23.751 | 8 |
| 2 | 21 | (Sweden) Timmy Hansen | Team Peugeot-Hansen | +0.918 | 5 |
| 3 | 1 | (Sweden) Mattias Ekström | EKS RX | +2.951 | 4 |
| 4 | 11 | (Norway) Petter Solberg | PSRX Volkswagen Sweden | +3.417 | 3 |
| 5 | 44 | (Germany) Timo Scheider | MJP Racing Team Austria | +5.438 | 2 |
| 6 | 71 | (Sweden) Kevin Hansen | Team Peugeot-Hansen | DNS | 1 |

== Standings after the event ==
| Pos | Driver | Pts | Gap |
|---|---|---|---|
| WC | (Sweden) Johan Kristoffersson | 316 | |
| 2 | (Sweden) Mattias Ekström | 255 | +61 |
| 3 | (Norway) Petter Solberg | 252 | +64 |
| 4 | (France) Sébastien Loeb | 214 | +102 |
| 5 | (Sweden) Timmy Hansen | 201 | +115 |

| Previous race: 2017 World RX of Germany | FIA World Rallycross Championship; 2017 season | Next race: 2018 World RX of Barcelona |
| Previous race: None | World RX of South Africa | Next race: Incumbent |
