= STARD =

Racing team

(Austria) STARD
- Founded: 2016
- Team principal(s): Manfred Stohl
- Current series: FIA World Rallycross Championship
- Current drivers: 6. (Latvia) Jānis Baumanis

STARD (Stohl Advanced Research and Development) is an auto racing team founded in 2016 by Austrian racing driver Manfred Stohl. The team supplies Ford Fiestas for the World Rallycross Championship and the Kia Cee'd for TCR-specification series. They are also developing the first electric rallycross cars.

== Racing record ==
=== Complete FIA World Rallycross Championship results ===
(key)

==== Supercar ====
| Year | Entrant | Car | No. | Driver | 1 | 2 | 3 | 4 | 5 | 6 | 7 | 8 | 9 | 10 | 11 | 12 | WRX | Points | Teams | Points |
|---|---|---|---|---|---|---|---|---|---|---|---|---|---|---|---|---|---|---|---|---|
| 2017 | STARD | Ford Fiesta | 6 | (Latvia) Jānis Baumanis | BAR; 15 | POR; 7 | HOC; 15 | BEL; 16 | GBR; 10 | NOR; 14 | SWE; 6 | CAN; 8 | FRA; 10 | LAT; 5 | GER; 9 | RSA; 9 | 12th | 98 | 6th | 176 |
| 2017 | STARD | Ford Fiesta | 7 | (Russia) Timur Timerzyanov | BAR; 20 | POR; 9 | HOC; 9 | BEL; 10 | GBR; 11 | NOR; 6 | SWE; 11 | CAN; 11 | FRA; 15 | LAT; 13 | GER; 17 | RSA; 13 | 13th | 78 | 6th | 176 |
| 2018 | STARD | Ford Fiesta | 6 | (Latvia) Jānis Baumanis | BAR; 8 | POR; 11 | BEL; 9 | GBR; 14 | NOR; 12 | SWE; 10 | CAN; 6 | FRA | LAT | USA | GER | RSA | 9th* | 64* | N/A | N/A |
| 2018 | STARD | Ford Fiesta | 58 | (China) Ma Qinghua | BAR | POR | BEL | GBR; 23 | NOR | SWE | CAN | FRA | LAT | USA | GER | RSA | 31st* | 0* | N/A | N/A |
| 2018 | STARD | Ford Fiesta | 60 | (Finland) Joni-Pekka Rajala | BAR | POR | BEL | GBR | NOR; 16 | SWE | CAN | FRA | LAT | USA | GER | RSA | 21st* | 1* | N/A | N/A |

^{*} Season still in progress.
