= Mark Higgins (driver) =

British rally driver (born 1971)

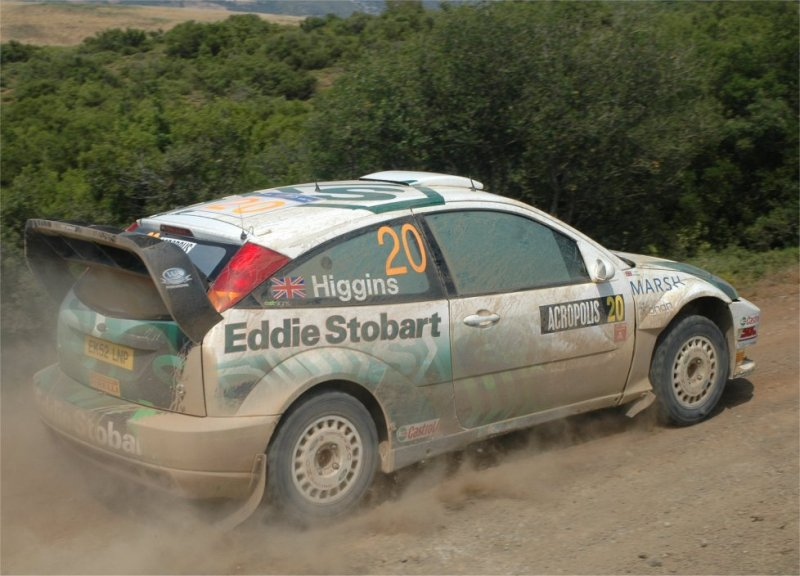
- Higgins with a Ford Focus RS WRC 04 at the 2005 Acropolis Rally

Personal information
- Nationality: (Isle of Man) Manx (United Kingdom) British
- Full name: Mark Anthony Higgins
- Born: 21 May 1971 (age 55)

World Rally Championship record
- Years active: 1990–2008, 2013, 2024
- Co-driver: (United Kingdom) David Moreton (United Kingdom) Cliff Simmons (United Kingdom) Mike Corner (United Kingdom) Phil Mills (United Kingdom) Bryan Thomas (United Kingdom) Michael Gibson (United Kingdom) Daniel Barritt (United Kingdom) Trevor Agnew (Republic of Ireland) Rory Kennedy (United Kingdom) Scott Martin (United Kingdom) Carl Williamson
- Teams: Nissan, Volkswagen, Vauxhall, Ford, M-Sport, Stobart Motorsport
- Rallies: 47
- Championships: 0
- Rally wins: 0
- Podiums: 0
- Stage wins: 1
- Total points: 3
- First rally: 1990 RAC Rally
- Last rally: 2013 Wales Rally GB

Mark Anthony Higgins (born 21 May 1971) is a Manx rally driver competing in the British Rally Championship. His co-driver was Rory Kennedy.

== Career ==
Higgins was born on the Isle of Man on 21 May 1971. He began his career in motorsport at the age of nine when he took up karting helped by his mother and father.

By the age of 17, Higgins had competed in a range of motor sport activities such as trial bikes and karts. Higgins also began his professional motorsport career with a trip to Sweden to learn from Timo Mäkinen and Anders Kulläng.

Higgins has won the British Rally Championship three times, 1997, 2005, 2006.

In 2016, Higgins piloted a Subaru WRX-STI Time Attack car to a new lap record around the Isle of Man TT Mountain Course. His time of 17 minutes 35 seconds beat his previous record by nearly two minutes.

In 2024, Higgins competed in the British historic rally championship, driving a David Appleby Engineering TR7. Higgins placed second owing to a shoulder injury prior to the start of the last rally of the season.

== Other work ==
Higgins has worked for many years with Top Gear's former Stig Ben Collins on various film and television sequences. Higgins was a stunt driver for the James Bond films Quantum of Solace, Skyfall Spectre and No Time to Die.

Higgins also appears as a stunt driver and on-camera in the fifth episode of the second season of Amazon's The Grand Tour.

== Personal life ==
Higgins lives in Powys, Mid-Wales, with his wife and two children. With his brother and father, he was also a partner in the family rally school located in Carno, near Newtown, Powys.

== Racing record ==
=== Complete WRC results ===
Year	Entrant	Car	1	2	3	4	5	6	7	8	9	10	11	12	13	14	15	16	WDC	Points
1990	Mark Higgins	Suzuki Swift GTi	MON	POR	KEN	FRA	GRE	NZL	ARG	FIN	AUS	ITA	CIV	GBR; Ret					NC	0
1991	Mark Higgins	Suzuki Swift GTi	MON	SWE; 70	POR	KEN	FRA	GRE	NZL	ARG	FIN	AUS	ITA	CIV	ESP				NC	0
1991	Mark Higgins	Vauxhall Nova														GBR; Ret			NC	0
1993	Mark Higgins	Vauxhall Astra GSI 16v	MON	SWE	POR	KEN	FRA	GRE	ARG	NZL	FIN	AUS	ITA	ESP	GBR; 19				NC	0
1994	Mark Higgins	Honda Civic VTi	MON	POR	KEN	FRA	GRE	ARG	NZL	FIN	ITA	GBR; Ret							NC	0
1997	Nissan Motorsports Europe	Nissan Micra Kit Car	MON	SWE	KEN	POR	ESP	FRA	ARG	GRE	NZL	FIN; Ret	IDN	ITA	AUS				NC	0
1997	Nissan Motorsports Europe	Nissan Almera Kit Car														GBR; Ret			NC	0
1998	Nissan Motorsports Europe	Nissan Almera Kit Car	MON	SWE	KEN	POR; Ret	ESP	FRA	ARG	GRE; Ret	NZL	FIN; 15	ITA; 18	AUS	GBR; Ret				NC	0
1999	Volkswagen Motorsport UK	Volkswagen Golf Kit Car	MON	SWE	KEN	POR	ESP	FRA	ARG	GRE	NZL	FIN; Ret	CHN	ITA	AUS; 13	GBR; 15			NC	0
2000	Vauxhall Motorsport	Vauxhall Astra Kit Car	MON	SWE	KEN	POR	ESP	ARG	GRE	NZL	FIN	CYP	FRA	ITA	AUS	GBR; 32			NC	0
2001	Mark Higgins	Mitsubishi Lancer Evo VI	MON	SWE	POR	ESP	ARG	CYP; Ret	GRE	KEN	FIN	NZL	ITA	FRA	AUS				NC	0
2001	Ford Motor Co	Ford Focus RS WRC 01														GBR; Ret			NC	0
2002	Ford Motor Co	Ford Focus RS WRC 02	MON	SWE	FRA	ESP	CYP	ARG	GRE	KEN	FIN	GER	ITA	NZL	AUS	GBR; 6			20th	1
2003	Mark Higgins	Renault Clio S1600	MON	SWE	TUR	NZL	ARG	GRE	CYP	GER	FIN; Ret	AUS							NC	0
2003	Mark Higgins	Subaru Impreza WRX											ITA; 17	FRA; 15	ESP	GBR			NC	0
2004	Mark Higgins	Subaru Impreza WRX STi	MON	SWE; Ret	MEX; Ret	NZL; Ret	CYP	GRE	TUR	ARG; Ret	FIN	GER	JPN		ITA	FRA; 16	ESP	AUS; Ret	NC	0
2004	M-Sport	Ford Focus RS WRC 01												GBR; 16					NC	0
2005	Mark Higgins	Subaru Impreza WRX STi	MON	SWE; Ret	MEX	NZL; Ret		CYP; Ret	TUR; 44		ARG; EX	FIN	GER		JPN	FRA	ESP	AUS; 10	25th	1
2005	Mark Higgins	Ford Focus RS WRC 04					ITA; 10							GBR; 8					25th	1
2005	Stobart VK Ford Rally Team	Ford Focus RS WRC 04								GRE; Ret									25th	1
2006	Mark Higgins	Ford Focus RS WRC 04	MON	SWE	MEX	ESP	FRA	ARG	ITA	GRE	GER	FIN	JPN	CYP	TUR	AUS	NZL	GBR; Ret	NC	0
2007	Mark Higgins	Mitsubishi Lancer Evo IX	MON	SWE; Ret	NOR	MEX; 10	POR	ARG	ITA	GRE; 18	FIN	GER	NZL	ESP	FRA	JPN; 19	IRE; Ret	GBR; 16	NC	0
2008	Subaru Rally Team USA	Subaru Impreza WRX STi	MON	SWE	MEX	ARG	JOR	ITA	GRE	TUR	FIN	GER	NZL	ESP	FRA	JPN	GBR; Ret		NC	0
2013	Symtech Racing	Ford Fiesta R5	MON	SWE	MEX	POR	ARG	GRE	ITA	FIN	GER	AUS	FRA	ESP	GBR; 10				31st	1

=== PWRC results ===
Year	Entrant	Car	1	2	3	4	5	6	7	8	PWRC	Points
2004	Mark Higgins	Subaru Impreza WRX STi	SWE; Ret	MEX; Ret	NZL; Ret	ARG; Ret	GER	FRA; 4	AUS; Ret		16th	5
2005	Mark Higgins	Subaru Impreza WRX STi	SWE; Ret	NZL; Ret	CYP; Ret	TUR; 13	ARG; EX	GBR	JPN	AUS; 2	13th	8
2007	Mark Higgins	Mitsubishi Lancer Evo IX	SWE; Ret	MEX; 1	ARG	GRE; 4	NZL	JPN; 5	IRE; Ret	GBR; 3	3rd	25
2008	Subaru Rally Team USA	Subaru Impreza WRX STi	SWE	ARG	GRE	TUR	FIN	NZL	JPN	GBR; Ret	NC	0

=== WRC-2 results ===
Year	Entrant	Car	1	2	3	4	5	6	7	8	9	10	11	12	13	Pos.	Points
2013	Symtech Racing	Ford Fiesta R5	MON	SWE	MEX	POR	ARG	GRE	ITA	FIN	GER	AUS	FRA	ESP	GBR; 3	23rd	15

=== Complete FIA World Rallycross Championship results ===
(key)

==== Supercar ====
Year	Entrant	Car	1	2	3	4	5	6	7	8	9	10	11	12	WRX	Points
2018	Mark Higgins	Peugeot 208	BAR	POR	BEL	GBR; 16	NOR	SWE	CAN	FRA	LAT	USA	GER	RSA	26th	1
2019	Mark Higgins	Peugeot 208 WRX	UAE	BAR	BEL	GBR; 15	NOR	SWE	CAN	FRA	LAT	RSA			29th	2

Awards and achievements
Preceded by Gwyndaf Evans	Autosport; National Rally Driver of the Year; 1997	Succeeded by Martin Rowe
Preceded by Tapio Laukkanen	Autosport; National Rally Driver of the Year; 2000	Succeeded by Justin Dale
Preceded by Guy Wilks	Autosport; National Rally Driver of the Year; 2005–2007	Succeeded by Oliver Turvey (combined award)
