= Team Peugeot Total =

(France) Team Peugeot Total
- Current series: World Rallycross Championship
- Former series: World Rally Championship (Peugeot Esso)
- Current drivers: (France) Sébastien Loeb (France) Stéphane Peterhansel (Spain) Carlos Sainz (France) Cyril Despres (Sweden) Timmy Hansen (Sweden) Kevin Hansen

Team Peugeot Total is the factory team of French car manufacture Peugeot. The team competes in the Dakar Rally and the FIA World Rallycross Championship.

== Main victories ==
The team won two Dakar Rally and one 24 Hours of Le Mans.

Year	Race	Team	Car
2009	24 Hours of Le Mans	(Australia) David Brabham (Spain) Marc Gené (Austria) Alexander Wurz	Peugeot 908 HDi FAP
2017	Dakar Rally	(France) Stéphane Peterhansel (France) Jean-Paul Cottret	Peugeot 2008 DKR
2018	Dakar Rally	(Spain) Carlos Sainz (Spain) Lucas Cruz	Peugeot 3008 DKR

== Rally raid cars ==
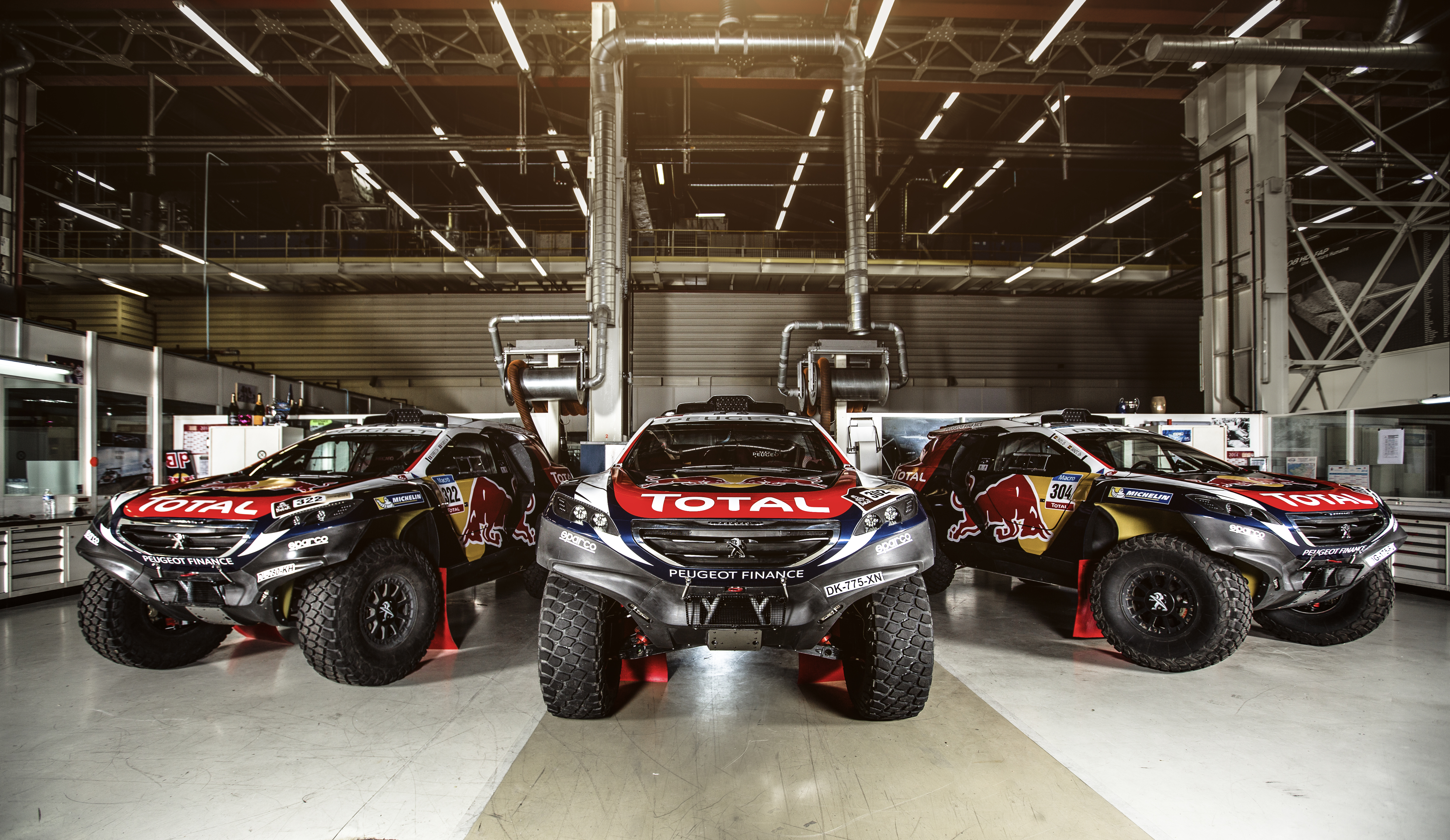
The presentation of the Peugeot 2008 DKR of ten team for 2014 Dakar Rally.

2015-2016

- Peugeot 2008 DKR

2017-2018

- Peugeot 3008 DKR

== Team 2018 ==
Are four the teams for rally raid 2018 season.

Car	Driver	Co-driver
Peugeot 3008 DKR	(France) Stéphane Peterhansel	(France) Jean-Paul Cottret
Peugeot 3008 DKR	(Spain) Carlos Sainz	(Spain) Lucas Cruz
Peugeot 3008 DKR	(France) Sébastien Loeb	(Monaco) Daniel Elena
Peugeot 3008 DKR	(France) Cyril Despres	(France) David Castera

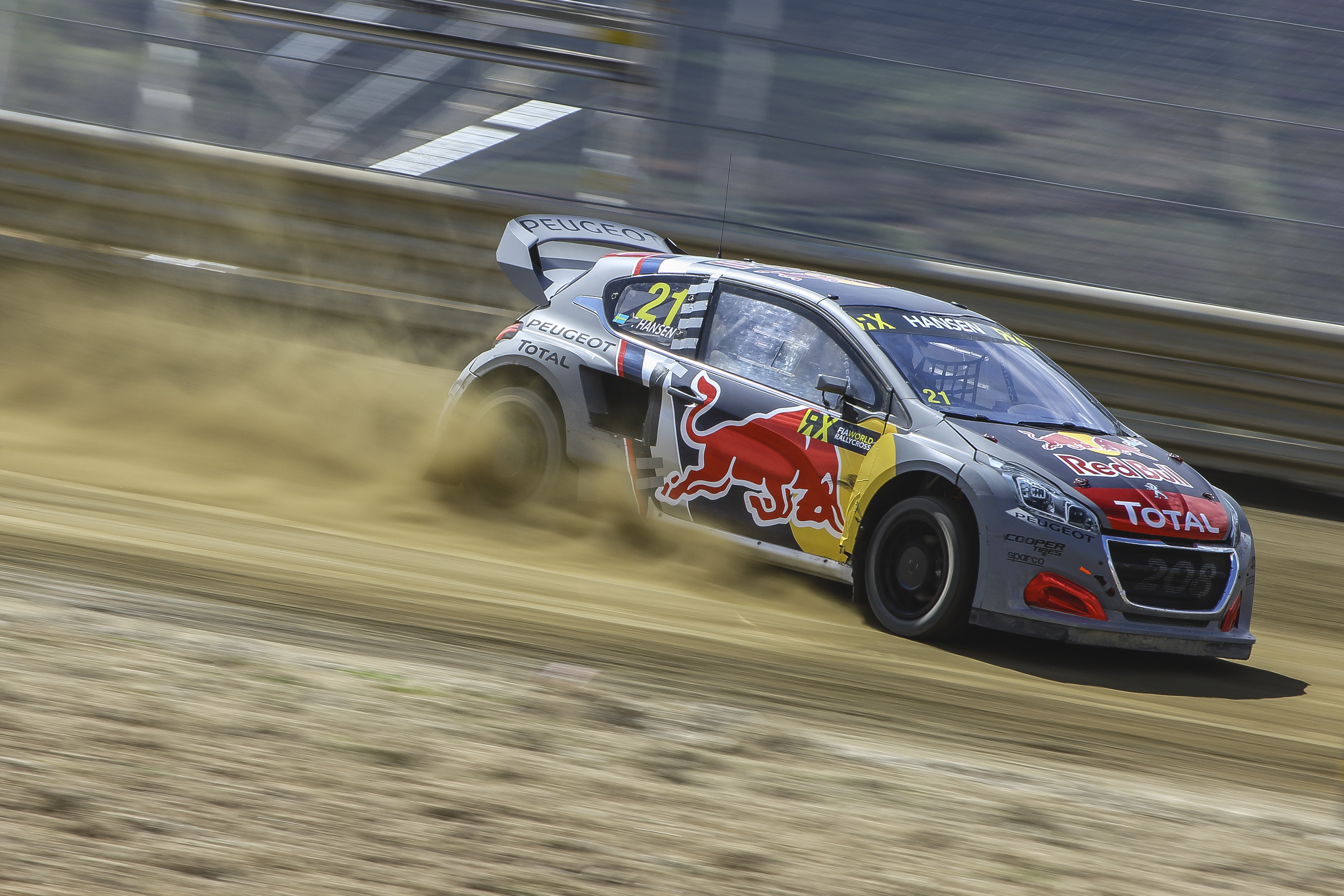
Timmy Hansen at the 2018 World RX of Portugal

== Racing record ==
=== Complete FIA World Rallycross Championship results ===
(key)

==== Supercar ====
Year	Entrant	Car	No.	Driver	1	2	3	4	5	6	7	8	9	10	11	12	WRX	Points	Teams	Points
2018	Team Peugeot Total	Peugeot 208	9	(France) Sébastien Loeb	BAR; 2	POR; 2	BEL; 1	GBR; 3	NOR; 8	SWE; 9	CAN; 3	FRA; 6	LAT; 3	USA; 4	GER; 8	RSA; 3	4th	229	3rd	421
2018	Team Peugeot Total	Peugeot 208	21	(Sweden) Timmy Hansen	BAR; 7	POR; 6	BEL; 3	GBR; 8	NOR; 5	SWE; 4	CAN; 2	FRA; 5	LAT; 5‡	USA; 6‡	GER; 7	RSA; 6	6th	192	3rd	421
2018	Team Peugeot Total	Peugeot 208	71	(Sweden) Kevin Hansen	BAR; 13	POR; 8	BEL; 9	GBR; 6	NOR; 4	SWE; 5	CAN; 9	FRA; 7†	LAT; 6	USA; 7	GER; 6	RSA; 4	8th	145	N/A	N/A

^{*} Season still in progress.

=== Complete Dakar Rally results ===
Year	Entrant	Car	No	Driver, Codriver	Pos.	Stg.
2015	Team Peugeot Total	Peugeot 2008 DKR	302	(France) Stéphane Peterhansel (France) Jean-Paul Cottret	11th	0
2015	Team Peugeot Total	Peugeot 2008 DKR	304	(Spain) Carlos Sainz Sr. (Spain) Lucas Cruz	Ret	0
2015	Team Peugeot Total	Peugeot 2008 DKR	322	(France) Cyril Despres (France) Gilles Picard	34th	0
2016	Team Peugeot Total	Peugeot 2008 DKR	302	(France) Stéphane Peterhansel (France) Jean-Paul Cottret	1st	3
2016	Team Peugeot Total	Peugeot 2008 DKR	303	(Spain) Carlos Sainz Sr. (Spain) Lucas Cruz	Ret	2
2016	Team Peugeot Total	Peugeot 2008 DKR	314	(France) Sébastien Loeb (Monaco) Daniel Elena	9th	4
2016	Team Peugeot Total	Peugeot 2008 DKR	321	(France) Cyril Despres (France) Gilles Picard	7th	0
2016	RD Limited	Peugeot 2008 DKR	328	(France) Romain Dumas (France) François Borsotto	20th	0
2017	Team Peugeot Total	Peugeot 3008 DKR	300	(France) Stéphane Peterhansel (France) Jean-Paul Cottret	1st	3
2017	Team Peugeot Total	Peugeot 3008 DKR	304	(Spain) Carlos Sainz Sr. (Spain) Lucas Cruz	Ret	0
2017	Team Peugeot Total	Peugeot 3008 DKR	307	(France) Cyril Despres (France) David Castera	3rd	1
2017	Team Peugeot Total	Peugeot 3008 DKR	309	(France) Sébastien Loeb (Monaco) Daniel Elena	2nd	5
2017	RD Limited	Peugeot 3008 DKR	328	(France) Romain Dumas (France) Alain Guehennec	8th	0
2017	PH-Sport	Peugeot 2008 DKR	328	(United Arab Emirates) Khalid Al-Qassimi (France) Pascal Maimon	Ret	0
2018	Team Peugeot Total	Peugeot 3008 DKR Maxi	300	(France) Stéphane Peterhansel (France) Jean-Paul Cottret	4th	3
2018	Team Peugeot Total	Peugeot 3008 DKR Maxi	303	(Spain) Carlos Sainz Sr. (Spain) Lucas Cruz	1st	2
2018	Team Peugeot Total	Peugeot 3008 DKR Maxi	306	(France) Sébastien Loeb (Monaco) Daniel Elena	Ret	1
2018	Team Peugeot Total	Peugeot 3008 DKR Maxi	308	(France) Cyril Despres (France) David Castera	31st	1
2018	PH-Sport; Abu Dhabi Racing	Peugeot 3008 DKR Maxi	319	(United Arab Emirates) Khalid Al-Qassimi (France) Xavier Panseri	Ret	0
2019	PH-Sport	Peugeot 3008 DKR Maxi	306	(France) Sébastien Loeb (Monaco) Daniel Elena	3rd	4
2019	PH-Sport	Peugeot 3008 DKR Maxi	312	(United Kingdom) Harry Hunt (Netherlands) Wouter Rosegaar	Ret	0
2019	PH-Sport	Peugeot 3008 DKR Maxi	325	(France) Pierre Lachaume (France) Jean Michel Polato	48th	0
2019	PH-Sport	Peugeot 3008 DKR Maxi	333	(France) Jean-Pascal Besson (France) Jean Brucy	Ret	0
2019	PH-Sport	Peugeot 3008 DKR Maxi	364	(France) Pierre Lafay (France) Sebastien Delaunay	Ret	0

== See also ==
- Peugeot Sport
- TotalEnergies
- Red Bull (main sponsor)
