= 2018 FIA World Rallycross Championship =

Auto racing championship

The 2018 FIA World Rallycross Championship presented by Monster Energy was the fifth season of the FIA World Rallycross Championship an auto racing championship recognised by the Fédération Internationale de l'Automobile (FIA) as the highest class of international rallycross.

Johan Kristoffersson won the Drivers' Championship for the second season running during the World RX of the United States.

== Calendar ==
The 2018 championship was contested over twelve rounds in Europe, Africa and North America.

Rnd.	Event	Dates	Venue	Class	Winner	Team	Report
1	(Spain) World RX of Barcelona	14–16 April	Circuit de Barcelona-Catalunya, Montmeló	Supercar	(Sweden) Johan Kristoffersson	PSRX Volkswagen Sweden	Report
2	World RX of Portugal	28–29 April	Pista Automóvel de Montalegre, Montalegre	Supercar	(Sweden) Johan Kristoffersson	PSRX Volkswagen Sweden	Report
3	World RX of Belgium	12–13 May	Circuit Jules Tacheny Mettet, Mettet	Supercar	(France) Sébastien Loeb	(France) Team Peugeot Total	Report
3	World RX of Belgium	12–13 May	Circuit Jules Tacheny Mettet, Mettet	RX2	(Norway) Ben-Philip Gundersen	(Sweden) JC Raceteknik	Report
4	(United Kingdom) World RX of Great Britain	25–27 May	Silverstone Circuit, Silverstone	Supercar	(Sweden) Johan Kristoffersson	PSRX Volkswagen Sweden	Report
4	(United Kingdom) World RX of Great Britain	25–27 May	Silverstone Circuit, Silverstone	RX2	(Sweden) Oliver Eriksson	(Sweden) Olsbergs MSE	Report
5	World RX of Norway	9–10 June	Lånkebanen, Hell	Supercar	(Sweden) Johan Kristoffersson	PSRX Volkswagen Sweden	Report
5	World RX of Norway	9–10 June	Lånkebanen, Hell	RX2	(Belgium) Guillaume De Ridder	(Sweden) Olsbergs MSE	Report
6	World RX of Sweden	30 June–1 July	Höljesbanan, Höljes	Supercar	(Sweden) Johan Kristoffersson	PSRX Volkswagen Sweden	Report
6	World RX of Sweden	30 June–1 July	Höljesbanan, Höljes	RX2	(Belgium) Guillaume De Ridder	(Sweden) Olsbergs MSE	Report
7	World RX of Canada	4–5 August	Circuit Trois-Rivières, Trois-Rivières	Supercar	(Sweden) Johan Kristoffersson	PSRX Volkswagen Sweden	Report
7	World RX of Canada	4–5 August	Circuit Trois-Rivières, Trois-Rivières	RX2	(Sweden) Oliver Eriksson	(Sweden) Olsbergs MSE	Report
8	Bretagne World RX of France	1–2 September	Circuit de Lohéac, Lohéac	Supercar	(Sweden) Johan Kristoffersson	PSRX Volkswagen Sweden	Report
8	Bretagne World RX of France	1–2 September	Circuit de Lohéac, Lohéac	RX2	(Sweden) Oliver Eriksson	(Sweden) Olsbergs MSE	Report
9	Neste World RX of Latvia	15–16 September	Biķernieku Kompleksā Sporta Bāze, Riga	Supercar	(Sweden) Johan Kristoffersson	PSRX Volkswagen Sweden	Report
10	World RX of the United States	29–30 September	Circuit of the Americas, Austin	Supercar	(Sweden) Johan Kristoffersson	PSRX Volkswagen Sweden	Report
11	World RX of Germany	13–14 October	Estering, Buxtehude	Supercar	(Sweden) Johan Kristoffersson	PSRX Volkswagen Sweden	Report
12	Gumtree World RX of South Africa	24–25 November	Killarney Motor Racing Complex, Cape Town	Supercar	(Sweden) Johan Kristoffersson	PSRX Volkswagen Sweden	Report
12	Gumtree World RX of South Africa	24–25 November	Killarney Motor Racing Complex, Cape Town	RX2	(Norway) Ben-Philip Gundersen	(Sweden) JC Raceteknik	Report

=== Calendar changes ===
- The championship will expand to include a round in the United States for the first time, with the Circuit of the Americas in Austin, Texas scheduled to host the event in conjunction with the Americas Rallycross Championship.
- The World RX of Great Britain event will relocate from Lydden Hill Race Circuit to a new venue at the Silverstone Circuit.
- The Hockenheim round of the championship was discontinued to accommodate the new American round.
- The World RX of Canada also shares an event with the Americas Rallycross Championship.

== Entries ==
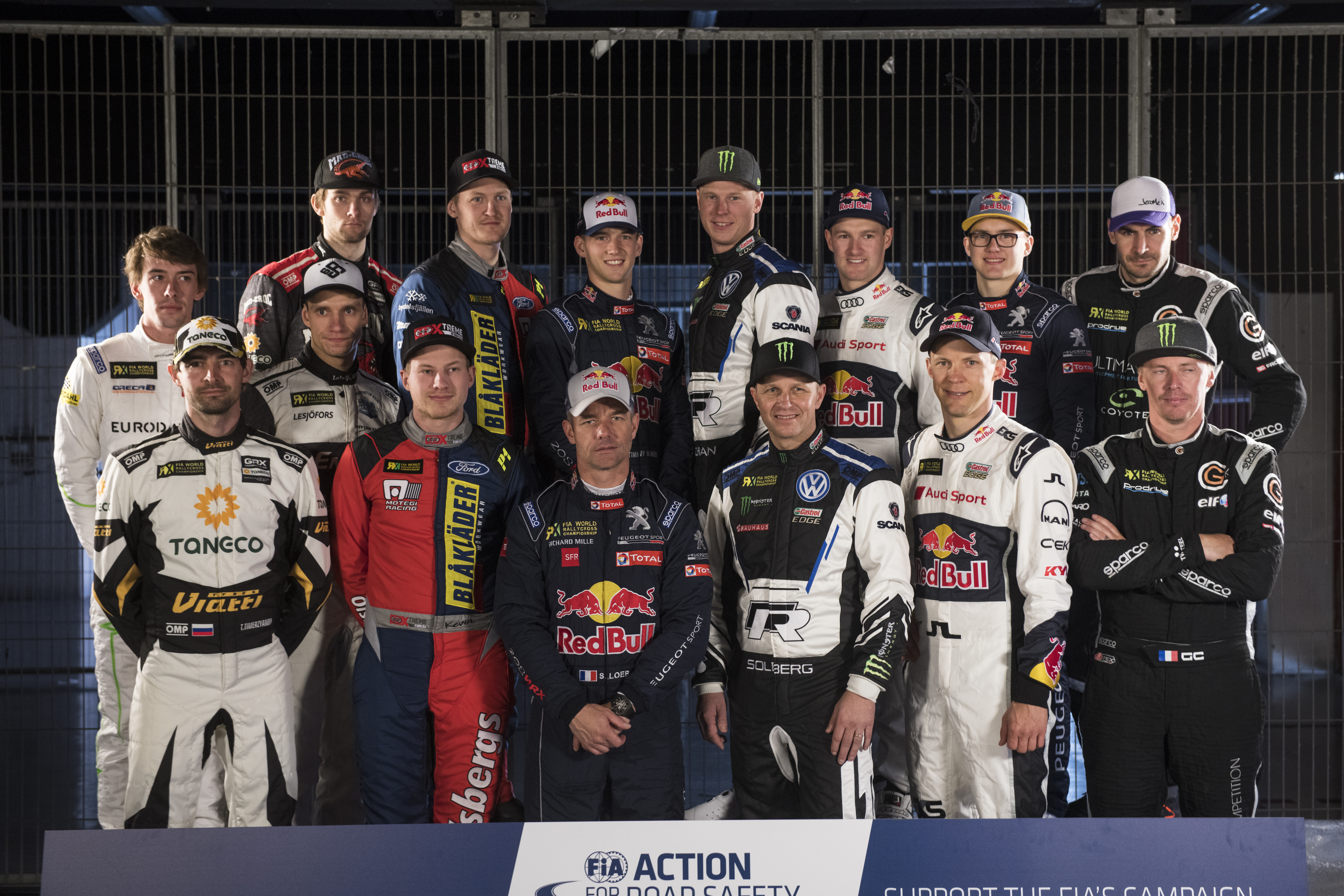
The permanent entrants of the 2018 Supercar season

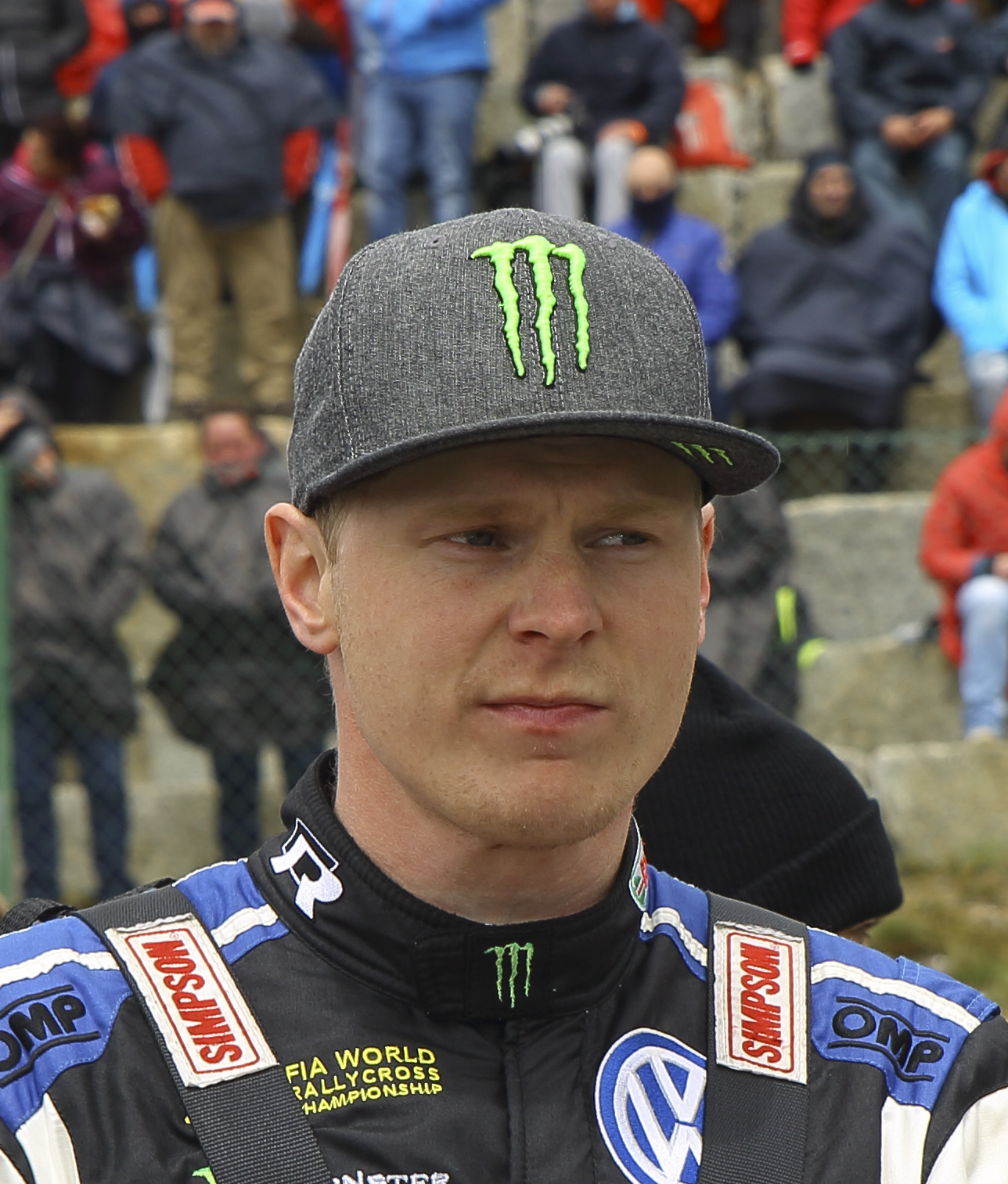
Johan Kristoffersson won his second successive Drivers' Championship

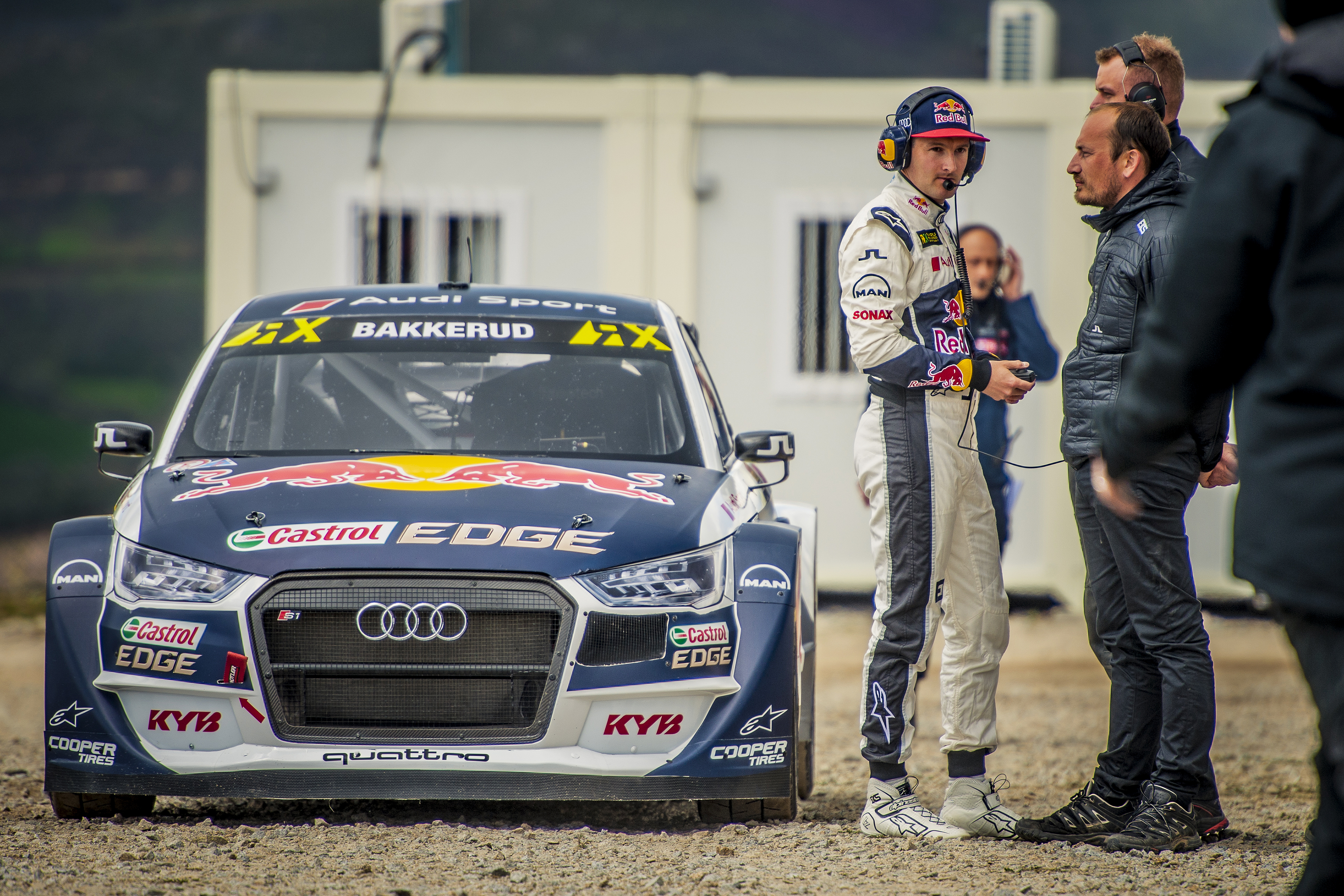
Andreas Bakkerud left the departing Hoonigan Racing Division to join Mattias Ekström's EKS RX

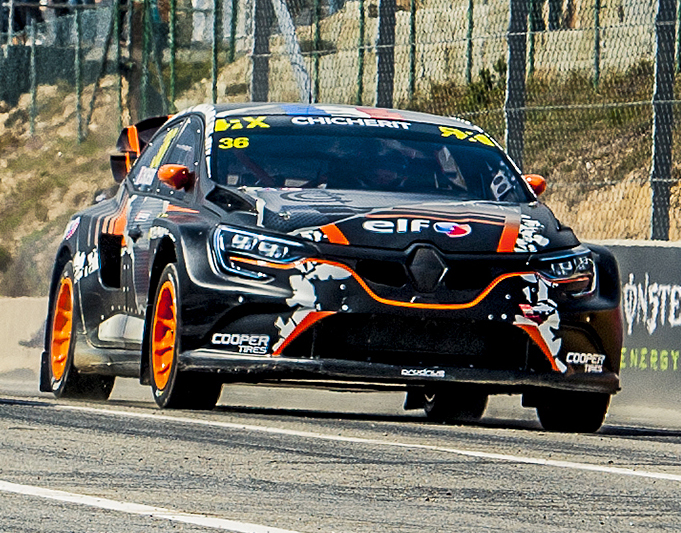
GC Kompetition entered the championship, fielding two Renault Méganes built by Prodrive

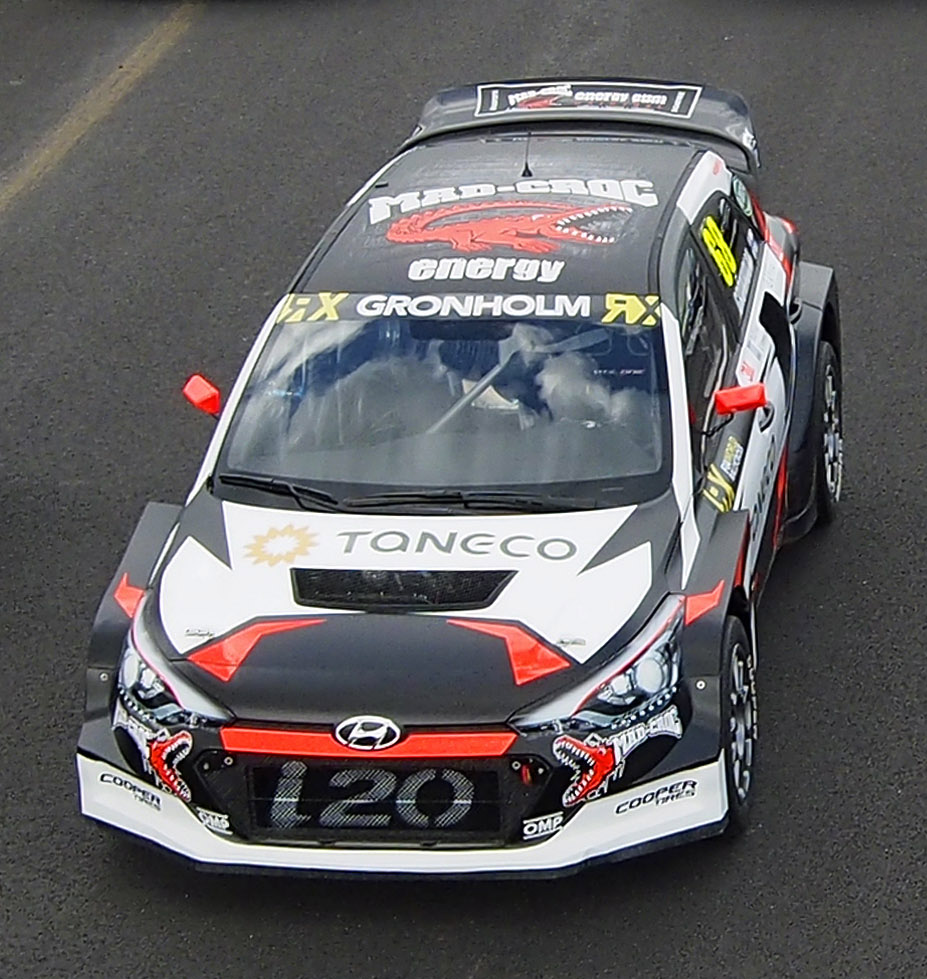
GRX Taneco also entered, using two ex-WRC Hyundai i20's

=== Supercar ===
Factory Teams
Constructor	Entrant	Car	No.	Drivers	Rounds
Audi	(Sweden) EKS Audi Sport	Audi S1	5	(Sweden) Mattias Ekström	All
Audi	(Sweden) EKS Audi Sport	Audi S1	13	(Norway) Andreas Bakkerud	All
Audi	(Sweden) EKS Audi Sport	Audi S1	51	(Switzerland) Nico Müller	9
Peugeot	(France) Team Peugeot Total	Peugeot 208	9	(France) Sébastien Loeb	All
Peugeot	(France) Team Peugeot Total	Peugeot 208	21	(Sweden) Timmy Hansen	All
Peugeot	(France) Team Peugeot Total	Peugeot 208	71	(Sweden) Kevin Hansen	All
Volkswagen	PSRX Volkswagen Sweden	Volkswagen Polo R	1	(Sweden) Johan Kristoffersson	All
Volkswagen	PSRX Volkswagen Sweden	Volkswagen Polo R	11	(Norway) Petter Solberg	All
Privateers / satellites
Constructor	Entrant	Car	No.	Drivers	Rounds
Audi	(Hungary) Kárai Motorsport Egyesület	Audi A1	102	(Hungary) Tamás Kárai	4
Audi	(Belgium) Comtoyou Racing	Audi S1	67	(Belgium) François Duval	3
BMW	(United Kingdom) Oliver Bennett	BMW MINI Cooper	42	(United Kingdom) Oliver Bennett	1-2, 4-6, 8-9, 11-12
Citroën	(Portugal) Mário Barbosa	Citroën DS3	75	(Portugal) Mário Barbosa	2
Citroën	(France) Hervé "Knapick" Lemonnier	Citroën DS3	84	(France) "Knapick"	1, 4, 8
Ford	(Austria) Team STARD	Ford Fiesta	6	(Latvia) Jānis Baumanis	All
Ford	(Austria) Team STARD	Ford Fiesta	58	(China) Qinghua Ma	4
Ford	(Austria) Team STARD	Ford Fiesta	60	(Finland) Joni-Pekka Rajala	5
Ford	(Republic of Ireland) Oliver O'Donovan	Ford Fiesta	2	(Republic of Ireland) Oliver O'Donovan	8
Ford	MJP Racing Team Austria	Ford Fiesta	31	(Austria) Max Pucher	5
Ford	MJP Racing Team Austria	Ford Fiesta	32	(Austria) Alexander Wurz	5, 9
Ford	MJP Racing Team Austria	Ford Fiesta	57	(Finland) Toomas Heikkinen	8-9
Ford	MJP Racing Team Austria	Ford Fiesta	177	(United Kingdom) Andrew Jordan	4, 8
Ford	(Sweden) Olsbergs MSE	Ford Fiesta ST	4	(Sweden) Robin Larsson	All
Ford	(Sweden) Olsbergs MSE	Ford Fiesta ST	96	(Sweden) Kevin Eriksson	All
Ford	(Portugal) Bompiso Racing Team	Ford Focus	41	(Portugal) Joaquim Santos	2
Hyundai	(Finland) GRX Taneco Team	Hyundai i20	7	(Russia) Timur Timerzyanov	All
Hyundai	(Finland) GRX Taneco Team	Hyundai i20	68	(Finland) Niclas Grönholm	All
Peugeot	(France) Sébastien Loeb Racing	Peugeot 208	66	(Belgium) Grégoire Demoustier^{1}	All
Peugeot	(United Kingdom) Mark Higgins	Peugeot 208	134	(United Kingdom) Mark Higgins	4
Peugeot	(France) Davy Jeanney	Peugeot 208	17	(France) Davy Jeanney	8
Peugeot	(France) Emmanuel Anne	Peugeot 208	29	(France) Emmanuel Anne	8
Peugeot	(France) Gaëten Serazin	Peugeot 208	62	(France) Gaëten Serzain	8
Peugeot	(France) Cyril Raymond	Peugeot 208	113	(France) Cyril Raymond	11
Renault	(France) GC Kompetition	Renault Mégane R.S.	33	(United Kingdom) Liam Doran	8-9, 11
Renault	(France) GC Kompetition	Renault Mégane R.S.	36	(France) Guerlain Chicherit	All
Renault	(France) GC Kompetition	Renault Mégane R.S.	74	(France) Jérôme Grosset-Janin	1-7
Renault	(France) GC Kompetition	Renault Mégane R.S.	92	(Sweden) Anton Marklund	10-12
SEAT	(Germany) Münnich Motorsport	SEAT Ibiza	44	(Germany) Timo Scheider	6, 8-9, 12
SEAT	(Germany) Münnich Motorsport	SEAT Ibiza	77	(Germany) René Münnich	5, 11-12
Volkswagen	(Sweden) Marklund Motorsport	Volkswagen Polo	24	(Norway) Tommy Rustad	4-5, 8
Volkswagen	(Sweden) Marklund Motorsport	Volkswagen Polo	92	(Sweden) Anton Marklund	4-5
Volkswagen	(Norway) Kjetil Larsen	Volkswagen Polo	64	(Norway) Kjetil Larsen	5, 11

Drivers with a green background are ineligible to score points towards the Championship for Teams.

- ^1 — Despite having been born in France, Grégoire Demoustier is recognised by the FIA World Rallycross Championship as a Belgian driver for the duration of the 2018 season.

=== RX2 ===
RX2 Teams
Constructor	Entrant	Car	No.	Drivers	Rounds
OMSE	(Sweden) JC Raceteknik	Olsbergs MSE RX2	2	(Norway) Ben-Philip Gundersen	All
OMSE	(Sweden) JC Raceteknik	Olsbergs MSE RX2	6	(Sweden) William Nilsson	All
OMSE	(Sweden) JC Raceteknik	Olsbergs MSE RX2	69	(Norway) Sondre Evjen	All
OMSE	(Sweden) JC Raceteknik	Olsbergs MSE RX2	77	(Norway) Henrik Krogstad	All
OMSE	(Sweden) JC Raceteknik	Olsbergs MSE RX2	90	(Sweden) Jimmie Walfridson	4
OMSE	(Sweden) JC Raceteknik	Olsbergs MSE RX2	91	(Sweden) Jonathan Walfridsson	4
OMSE	(Sweden) JC Raceteknik	Olsbergs MSE RX2	99	(Sweden) Marcus Höglund	3-4
OMSE	(Finland) Set Promotion	Olsbergs MSE RX2	8	(Norway) Simon Wågø Syversen	1-6
OMSE	(Finland) Set Promotion	Olsbergs MSE RX2	22	(Finland) Sami-Matti Trogen	2-7
OMSE	(Finland) Set Promotion	Olsbergs MSE RX2	65	(Finland) Jami Kalliomäki	All
OMSE	(Finland) Set Promotion	Olsbergs MSE RX2	59	(South Africa) Ashley Haigh-Smith	7
OMSE	(Norway) Glenn Haug	Olsbergs MSE RX2	9	(Norway) Glenn Haug	1-4
OMSE	(Sweden) Martin Jonsson	Olsbergs MSE RX2	10	(Sweden) Martin Jonsson	4
OMSE	(Sweden) Mats Oskarsson	Olsbergs MSE RX2	11	(Sweden) Mats Oskarsson	4
OMSE	(Sweden) Anders Michalak	Olsbergs MSE RX2	12	(Sweden) Anders Michalak	All
OMSE	(Sweden) Hampus Rådström	Olsbergs MSE RX2	17	(Sweden) Hampus Rådström	4
OMSE	(Sweden) Olsbergs MSE	Olsbergs MSE RX2	16	(Sweden) Oliver Eriksson	All
OMSE	(Sweden) Olsbergs MSE	Olsbergs MSE RX2	18	(Sweden) Linus Östlund	4
OMSE	(Sweden) Olsbergs MSE	Olsbergs MSE RX2	53	(United States) Cole Keatts	All
OMSE	(Sweden) Olsbergs MSE	Olsbergs MSE RX2	96	(Belgium) Guillaume De Ridder	All
OMSE	(Sweden) Team Faren	Olsbergs MSE RX2	21	(United States) Conner Martell	All
OMSE	(Sweden) Team Faren	Olsbergs MSE RX2	50	(United Kingdom) Nathan Heathcote	All
OMSE	(Belgium) Koen Pauwels	Olsbergs MSE RX2	23	(Belgium) Koen Pauwels	1
OMSE	(Norway) Petter Leirhol	Olsbergs MSE RX2	27	(Norway) Petter Leirhol	4
OMSE	(United States) Christian Brooks	Olsbergs MSE RX2	44	(United States) Christian Brooks	4
OMSE	(Sweden) Simon Olofsson	Olsbergs MSE RX2	52	(Sweden) Simon Olofsson	1-4, 6-7
OMSE	(Latvia) Sport Racing Technologies	Olsbergs MSE RX2	55	(Latvia) Vasily Gryazin	All
OMSE	(Latvia) Sport Racing Technologies	Olsbergs MSE RX2	75	(Latvia) Edijs Oss	6
OMSE	(Latvia) Sport Racing Technologies	Olsbergs MSE RX2	15	(Latvia) Reinis Nitišs	7
OMSE	(Spain) Albert Llovera	Olsbergs MSE RX2	66	(Spain) Albert Llovera ^{2}	1-6
OMSE	(Sweden) Santosh Berggren	Olsbergs MSE RX2	68	(Sweden) Santosh Berggren	4
OMSE	(Sweden) Johnny Andersson	Olsbergs MSE RX2	86	(Sweden) Johnny Andersson	4
OMSE	(Norway) Stein Frederic-Akre	Olsbergs MSE RX2	98	(Norway) Stein Frederic-Akre	4

^{2} Despite having been born in Andorra, Albert Llovera is recognised by the RX2 International Series and by extension, the FIA World Rallycross Championship as a Spanish driver for the duration of the 2018 season.

=== Team changes ===
- Hoonigan Racing Division withdrew from the series at the conclusion of the 2017 championship.
- Team Peugeot Total will step up their involvement in World RX, running as a full factory team in 2018, as compared to the family-based Hansen Motorsport-run cars in 2017.
- Olsbergs MSE returned to World RX full-time in 2018 after competing part-time in 2017. They will debut their new-specification 2018 Ford Fiesta ST MK8 Supercars, built in collaboration with Ford Performance in Barcelona.
- GC Kompetition (GCK) will make their World RX debut as a team entry. Team owner and driver Guerlain Chicherit oversaw the development of the new Renault Mégane R.S. RX, which was built in collaboration with Prodrive.
- GRX Taneco will enter the championship, using a pair of ex-Hyundai Motorsport Hyundai i20 WRC cars built to rallycross specifications by Set Promotion. Double world rally champion Marcus Grönholm will be the team's principal.
- Sébastien Loeb Racing will enter the championship with a single Peugeot 208 WRX run for Grégoire Demoustier.

=== Driver changes ===
- Andreas Bakkerud left Hoonigan Racing Division to join EKS RX.
- Toomas Heikkinen and Reinis Nitišs both left EKS RX. Nitišs will instead re-join Set Promotion, the team in which he won the Super1600 championship with in 2013, and compete in the FIA European Rallycross Championship with an M-Sport Ford Fiesta. Heikkinen also joined the team, but stepped down from driving duties, becoming Nitišs’ team manager and a driving coach for Set Promotion's Super1600 drivers.
- After spending a year with MJP Racing Team Austria in 2017, Kevin Eriksson returned to his father's Olsbergs MSE team alongside fellow countryman Robin Larsson, who will make his return to World RX after a year sabbatical.
- Jérôme Grosset-Janin will partner team owner and driver Guerlain Chicherit, driving for the new GCK team.
- Double European Rallycross champion Timur Timerzyanov left STARD to join GRX Taneco, partnering Niclas Grönholm in the new Hyundai i20.

== Results and standings ==
World Championship points are scored as follows:

	Position															
Round	1st	2nd	3rd	4th	5th	6th	7th	8th	9th	10th	11th	12th	13th	14th	15th	16th
Heats	16	15	14	13	12	11	10	9	8	7	6	5	4	3	2	1
Semi-Finals	6	5	4	3	2	1										
Final	8	5	4	3	2	1										

- A red background denotes drivers who did not advance from the round

=== FIA World Rallycross Championship for Drivers ===
Pos.	Driver	BAR (Spain)	POR (Portugal)	BEL (Belgium)	GBR (United Kingdom)	NOR (Norway)	SWE (Sweden)	CAN (Canada)	FRA (France)	LAT (Latvia)	USA (United States)	GER (Germany)	RSA (South Africa)	Points
1	(Sweden) Johan Kristoffersson	1	1	5	1	1	1	1	1	1	1	1	1	341
2	(Sweden) Mattias Ekström	6^{a}	7	4	4	2	6	4	4	2	5	2	2	248
3	(Norway) Andreas Bakkerud	3	4	6	2	6	2	7	2	8	3	3	7	237
4	(France) Sébastien Loeb	2	2	1	3	8	9	3	6	3	4	8	3	229
5	(Norway) Petter Solberg	5	3	2	7	3	7	5	3	7	2	5	5^{b}	227
6	(Sweden) Timmy Hansen	7	6	3	8	5	4	2	5	5^{b}	6^{b}	7	6	192
7	(Finland) Niclas Grönholm	4	10	11	5	7	11	8	11	4	8	4	13	146
8	(Sweden) Kevin Hansen	13	8	9	6	4	5	9	7^{b}	6	7	6	4	145
9	(Latvia) Jānis Baumanis	8	11	10	14	12	10	6	13	14	11	11	9	98
10	(Russia) Timur Timerzyanov	10	12	8	12	21	8	11	9	11	13	20	11	86
11	(France) Guerlain Chicherit	12	5	10	15	15	14	15	12	10	9	13	12	68
12	(France) Jérôme Grosset-Janin	11	14	14	10	14	3	13						47
13	(Sweden) Kevin Eriksson	14	9	16	9	9	13^{b}	10^{b}	10^{b}	16	10	10	14	38
14	(Sweden) Anton Marklund				17	11					12^{b}	9	8	35
15	(Sweden) Robin Larsson	9	13	7	13	10	12	12^{b}	17^{b}	17	14	12	15	34
16	(United Kingdom) Liam Doran								8	12		19		19
17	(Norway) Tommy Rustad				11	13			16					14
18	(Germany) Timo Scheider						17		25	13			10	13
19	(Switzerland) Nico Müller									9				10
20	(Finland) Toomas Heikkinen								14	15				5
21	(Belgium) François Duval			13										4
22	(Norway) Kjetil Larsen					19						14		3
23	(United Kingdom) Andrew Jordan				20				15					2
24	(Germany) René Münnich					17						16	16	2
25	(Finland) Joni-Pekka Rajala					16								1
26	(Isle of Man) Mark Higgins				16									1
27	(France) "Knapick"	17			22				23					0
28	(Portugal) Joaquim Santos		17											0
29	(Austria) Alexander Wurz					18				18				0
30	(Portugal) Mário Barbosa		18											0
31	(France) Cyril Raymond											18		0
32	(Hungary) Tamás Kárai				19									0
33	(France) Davy Jeanney								20					0
34	(France) Gaëten Serzain								21					0
35	(Republic of Ireland) Oliver O'Donovan								22					0
36	(Austria) Max Pucher					23								0
37	(China) Qinghua Ma				23									0
38	(France) Emmanuel Anne								24					0
39	(United Kingdom) Oliver Bennett	15	16		21	20	15		18	20		15	18^{c}	-3
40	(Belgium) Grégoire Demoustier	16	15	15	18	22	16	14	19	19	15	17	17^{b}	-4
Pos.	Driver	BAR (Spain)	POR (Portugal)	BEL (Belgium)	GBR (United Kingdom)	NOR (Norway)	SWE (Sweden)	CAN (Canada)	FRA (France)	LAT (Latvia)	USA (United States)	GER (Germany)	RSA (South Africa)	Points

Colour	Result
Gold	Winner
Silver	Second place
Bronze	Third place
Green	Points classification
Blue	Non-points classification
Blue	Non-classified finish (NC)
Purple	Retired, not classified (Ret)
Red	Did not qualify (DNQ)
Red	Did not pre-qualify (DNPQ)
Black	Disqualified (DSQ)
White	Did not start (DNS)
White	Withdrew (WD)
White	Race cancelled (C)
Blank	Did not practice (DNP)
Blank	Did not arrive (DNA)
Blank	Excluded (EX)

^{a} Ekström received no points from the final as he was disqualified after crashing into Solberg.
^{b} Loss of fifteen championship points – stewards' decision
^{c} Loss of ten championship points – stewards' decision

=== FIA World Rallycross Championship for Teams ===
Pos.	Team	No.	Drivers	Points
1	PSRX Volkswagen Sweden	1	(Sweden) Johan Kristoffersson	568
1	PSRX Volkswagen Sweden	11	(Norway) Petter Solberg	568
2	(Sweden) EKS Audi Sport	5	(Sweden) Mattias Ekström	485
2	(Sweden) EKS Audi Sport	13	(Norway) Andreas Bakkerud	485
3	(France) Team Peugeot Total	9	(France) Sébastien Loeb	421
3	(France) Team Peugeot Total	21	(Sweden) Timmy Hansen	421
4	(Finland) GRX Taneco Team	28	(Russia) Timur Timerzyanov	232
4	(Finland) GRX Taneco Team	68	(Finland) Niclas Grönholm	232
5	(France) GC Kompetition	33	(United Kingdom) Liam Doran	152
5	(France) GC Kompetition	36	(France) Guerlain Chicherit	152
5	(France) GC Kompetition	74	(France) Jérôme Grosset-Janin	152
5	(France) GC Kompetition	92	(Sweden) Anton Marklund	152
6	(Sweden) Olsbergs MSE	4	(Sweden) Robin Larsson	72
6	(Sweden) Olsbergs MSE	96	(Sweden) Kevin Eriksson	72

=== RX2 International Series ===
(key)

Pos.	Driver	BEL (Belgium)	GBR (United Kingdom)	NOR (Norway)	SWE (Sweden)	CAN (Canada)	FRA (France)	RSA (South Africa)	Points
1	(Sweden) Oliver Eriksson	7	1	2	4	1	1	6	175
2	(Belgium) Guillaume De Ridder	8	7	1	1	2	3	7	156
3	(Norway) Henrik Krogstad	3	8	3	2	8	6	9	121
4	(Norway) Ben-Philip Gundersen	1	10	8	5	7	11	1	119
5	(Latvia) Vasily Gryazin	5	6	5	14	4	10	3	118
6	(Norway) Sondre Evjen	2	3	4	22	11	5	2	106
7	(Sweden) William Nilsson	4	12	6	7	9	8	4	93
8	(Finland) Jami Kalliomäki	6	9	10	11	10	9	8	83
9	(United States) Conner Martell	10	2	12	17	6	4	10	80
10	(Finland) Sami-Matti Trogen		11	9	15	5	2	5	79
11	(United Kingdom) Nathan Heathcote	14	17	11	10	13	7	11	49
12	(Norway) Simon Wågø Syversen	11	13	7	24	12	12		38
13	(Sweden) Anders Michalak	13	4	14	21	14	15	13	33
14	(Sweden) Simon Olofsson	12	15	15	3		14	14	32
15	(United States) Cole Keatts	16	14	16	27	3	13	12	31
16	(Norway) Glenn Haug	9	5	13	18				25
17	(United States) Christian Brooks				6				20
18	(Sweden) Jimmie Walfridson				8				14
19	(Sweden) Marcus Höglund			17	9				13
20	(Norway) Petter Leirhol				12				6
21	(Sweden) Linus Ostlund				13				4
22	(Spain) Albert Llovera	17	16	18	29	15	17		3
23	(Belgium) Koen Pauwels	15							2
24	(Latvia) Reinis Nitišs							15	2
25	(South Africa) Ashely Haigh-Smith							16	1
26	(Latvia) Edijs Oss						16		1
27	(Norway) Stein Frederic-Akre				16				1
28	(Sweden) Santosh Berggren				19				0
29	(Sweden) Mats Oskarsson				20				0
30	(Sweden) Hampus Rådström				23				0
31	(Sweden) Martin Jonsson				25				0
32	(Sweden) Johnny Andersson				26				0
33	(Sweden) Jonathan Walfridsson				28				0
Pos.	Driver	BEL (Belgium)	GBR (United Kingdom)	NOR (Norway)	SWE (Sweden)	CAN (Canada)	FRA (France)	RSA (South Africa)	Points

== See also ==
2018 in rallycross
