= Kevin Eriksson =

Swedish racing driver

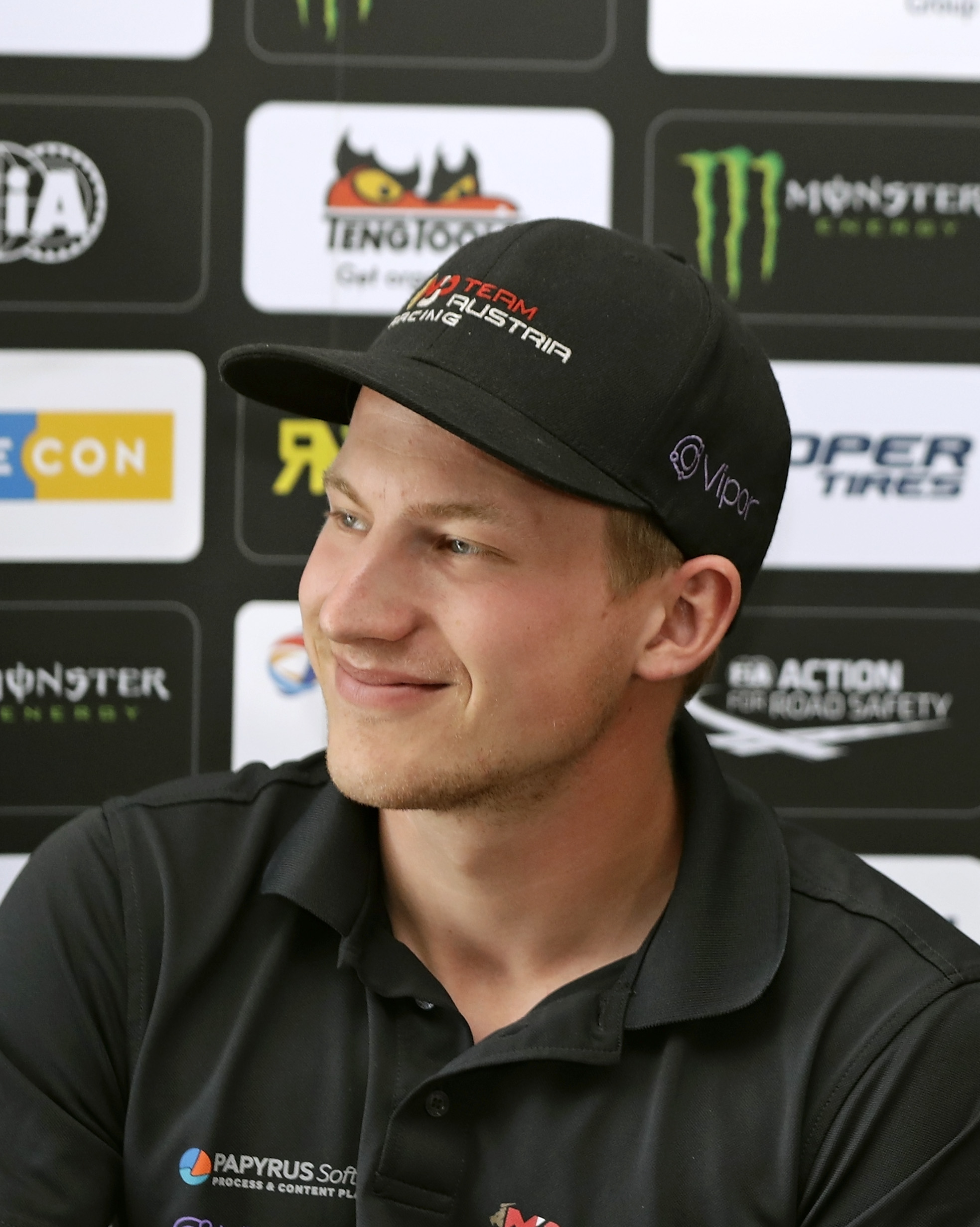
- Eriksson in 2017
- Nationality: (Sweden) Swedish
- Born: 16 July 1996 (age 30) Nynäshamn, Sweden
- Relatives: Andréas Eriksson (father); Oliver Eriksson (brother)

FIA World Rallycross Championship career
- Debut season: 2014
- Current team: Olsbergs MSE
- Car number: 96/196
- Former teams: MJP Racing Team Austria
- Starts: 37
- Wins: 1
- Podiums: 2
- Best finish: 11th in 2016 and 2017

RX Lites Cup
- Years active: 2014–2015
- Former teams: Olsbergs MSE
- Starts: 14
- Championships: 1 (2014)
- Wins: 3
- Podiums: 8

FIA ERX Super1600 Championship
- Years active: 2013
- Former teams: Set Promotion
- Starts: 5
- Wins: 1
- Podiums: 2
- Best finish: 8th in 2013

Kevin Andréas Eriksson (born 16 July 1996) is a Swedish racing driver that has competed in international rallycross, including the FIA World Rallycross Championship, Nitro Rallycross and currently RallyX.

In 2016, Eriksson made his debut in FIA RX Supercar with a full-time entry. In 2023, Eriksson won the Nitro Rallycross Calgary non-points race, after missing two opening rounds of the seasons championship contention due to injury.

Eriksson's father, Andréas, is the owner of the Olsbergs MSE rallycross team. His brother Oliver Eriksson is also a rallycross driver.

== Racing record ==
=== Complete FIA European Rallycross Championship results ===
(key)

==== Super1600 ====
Year	Entrant	Car	1	2	3	4	5	6	7	8	9	ERX	Points
2013	SET Promotion	Renault Clio	GBR; 9	POR; 1	HUN; 3	FIN	NOR; 6	SWE; 6	FRA	AUT	GER	8th	96

=== Complete FIA World Rallycross Championship results ===
(key)

==== Supercar ====
Year	Entrant	Car	1	2	3	4	5	6	7	8	9	10	11	12	WRX	Points
2014	Olsbergs MSE	Ford Fiesta ST	POR	GBR	NOR	FIN	SWE	BEL	CAN	FRA	GER	ITA	TUR	ARG; 3	22nd	20
2016	Olsbergs MSE	Ford Fiesta ST	POR; 8	HOC; 11	BEL; 10	GBR; 8	NOR; 13	SWE; 15	CAN; 11	FRA	BAR; 11	LAT; 13	GER; 1	ARG; 16	11th	92
2017	MJP Racing Team Austria	Ford Fiesta	BAR; 13	POR; 14	HOC; 10	BEL; 5	GBR; 9	NOR; 13	SWE; 5	CAN; 4	FRA; 16	LAT; 18	GER; 10	RSA; 12	11th	101
2018	Olsbergs MSE	Ford Fiesta ST	BAR; 14	POR; 9	BEL; 16	GBR; 9	NOR; 9	SWE; 13†	CAN; 10†	FRA; 10†	LAT; 16	USA; 10	GER; 10	RSA; 14	13th	38
2019	Olsbergs MSE	Ford Fiesta MK8	ABU	BAR	BEL	GBR	NOR	SWE; 11	CAN	FRA	LAT	RSA			24th	8

^{†} Loss of fifteen championship points – stewards' decision.

==== RX Lites Cup ====
Year	Entrant	Car	1	2	3	4	5	6	7	Lites	Points
2014	Olsbergs MSE	Lites Ford Fiesta	POR; 2	GBR; 4	FIN; 4	SWE; 1	ITA; 2	TUR; 4		1st	136
2015	Olsbergs MSE	Lites Ford Fiesta	POR; 1	GBR; 2	SWE; 3	NOR; 3	BAR; 4	TUR; 5	ITA; 1	2nd	166

=== RallyX on Ice ===
(key)

Year	Entrant	Car	1	2	3	4	RallyX	Points
2016	Olsbergs MSE	Lites Ford Fiesta	PIT; 2	SAL; 2	TRY; 7	ÅRE; 2	1st	40

=== Complete Global Rallycross Championship results ===
(key)

==== Supercar ====
Year	Entrant	Car	1	2	3	4	5	6	7	8	9	10	11	12	GRC	Points
2016	Honda Red Bull OMSE	Honda Civic Coupe	PHO1	PHO2	DAL	DAY1	DAY2	MCAS1	MCAS2; C	DC	AC; 13	SEA	LA1	LA2	18th	4

Sporting positions
Preceded by None	RX Lites Cup Champion; 2014	Succeeded by Kevin Hansen
