= EKS RX =

Swedish auto racing team

(Sweden) EKS Audi Sport
- Founded: 2014
- Team principal(s): Mattias Ekström
- Current series: FIA World Rallycross Championship
- Former series: FIA European Rallycross Championship
- Current drivers: 1. (Sweden) Johan Kristoffersen; 91. (Belgium) Enzo Ide
- Teams' Championships: 2016 FIA WRX
- Drivers' Championships: 2016 FIA WRX (Mattias Ekström)

EKS RX is a Swedish auto racing team founded by racing driver Mattias Ekström. The team is competing in FIA World Rallycross Championship since 2014 and entered the team championship in 2015.

In January 2017 it was announced that the team would receive full factory support from Audi Sport for the 2017 World Rallycross Championship. The team had previously been run with assistance from Audi Sport's official suppliers.

On 29 January 2018, team owner Mattias Ekström announced that he would be leaving the DTM series and concentrating on his World RX team. An announcement two days later confirmed that Andreas Bakkerud would be racing for the team in 2018.

After the 2018 season on December 10, EKS announced that it would end its rallycross factory program due to Audi pulling the funding. The team did however make a return in 2019, now as a privateer, with Hungarian driver Krisztián Szabó. Ekström also competed at Spa-Francorchamps, in a technical partnership with JC Raceteknik.

For the 2020 FIA World Rallycross Championship, Ekström became a full-time driver for KYB Team JC, finishing runner-up with two wins. His teammate Robin Larsson ranked 6th in points. The partnership was strengthened for the 2021 season, so the team was rebranded KYB EKS JC. Also in 2021, the team partnered with Dreyer & Reinbold Racing to compete at Nitro Rallycross.

== Racing record ==
=== Complete FIA European Rallycross Championship results ===
(key)

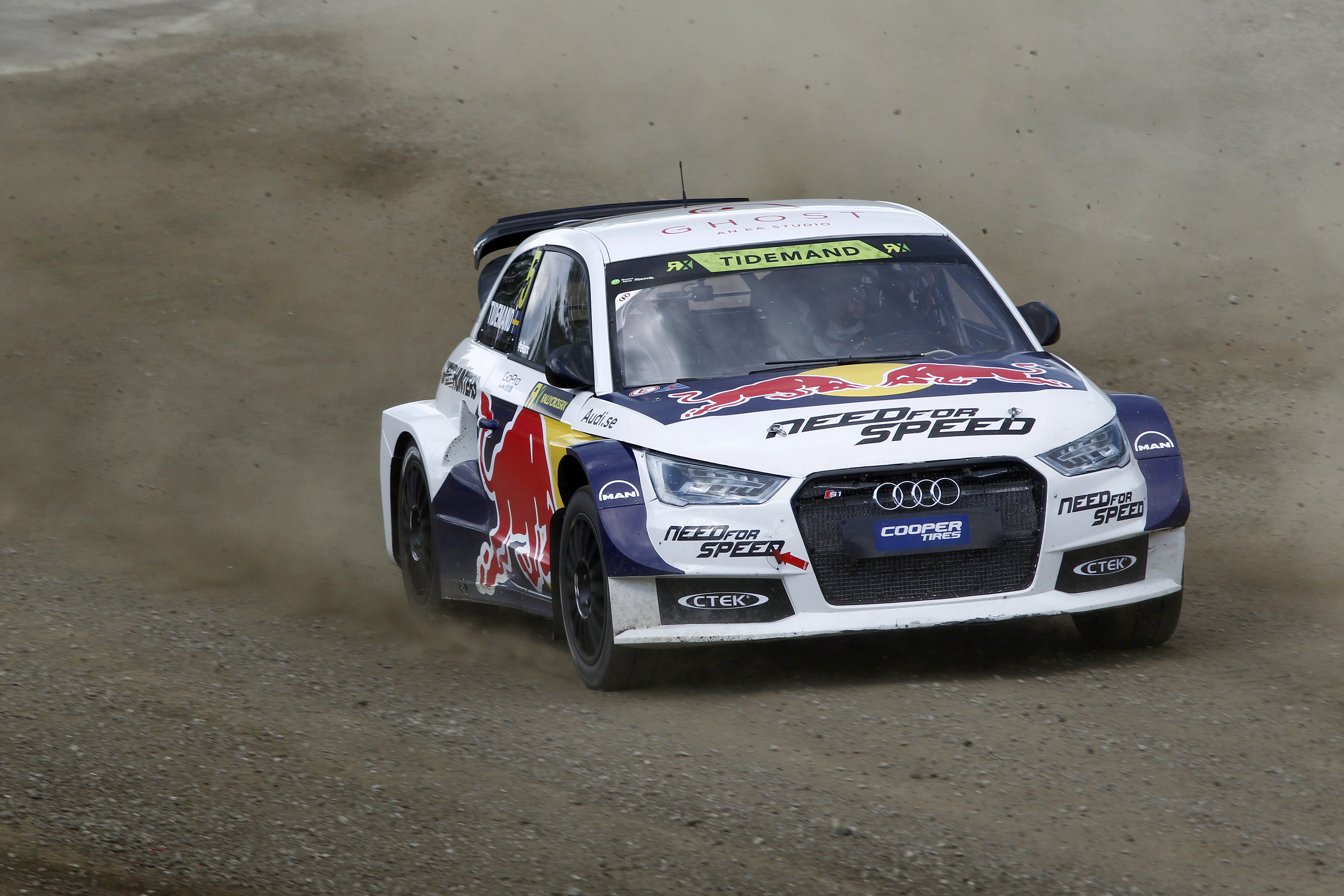
Pontus Tidemand competing in the 2014 World RX of Finland.

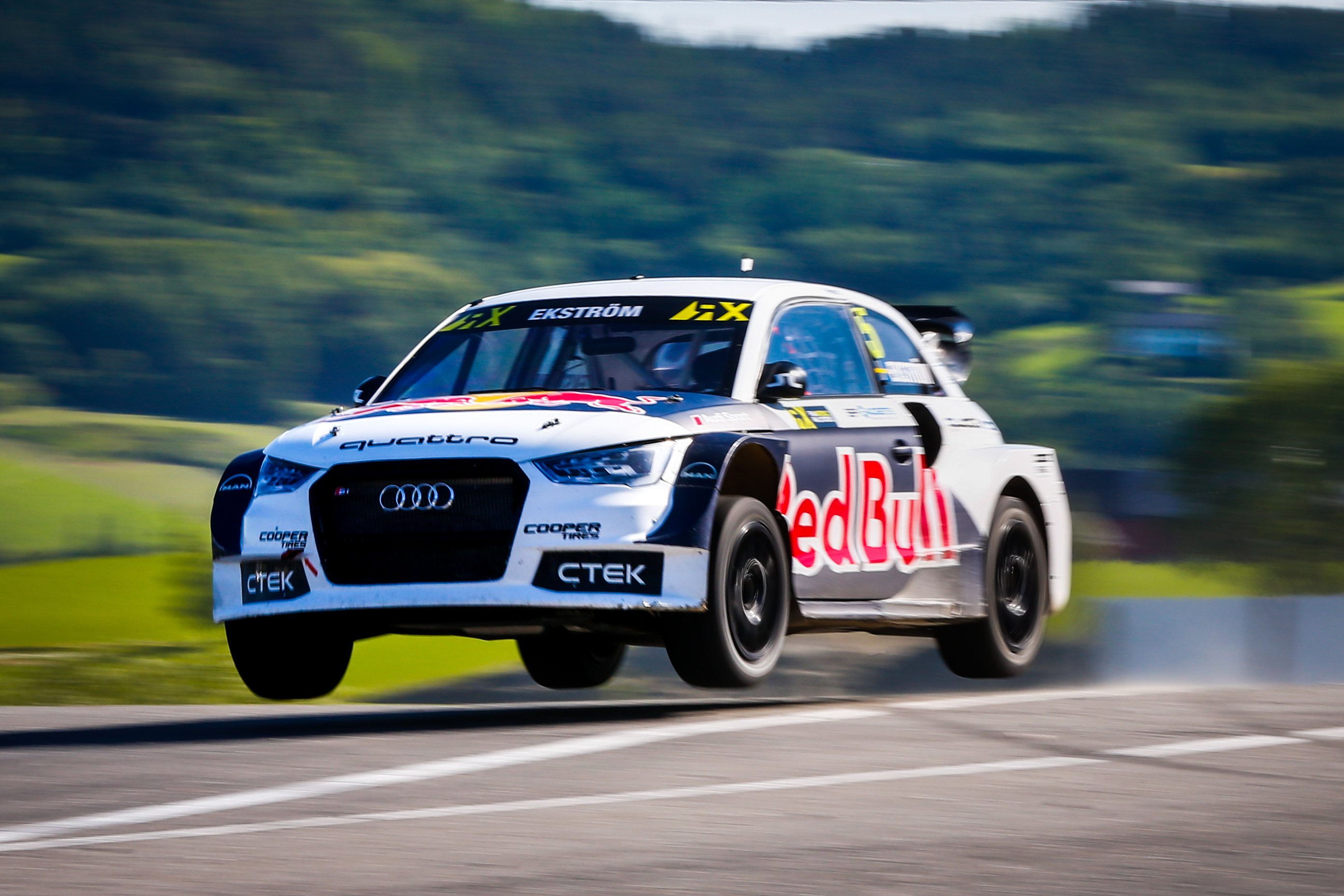
Mattias Ekström competing in the 2016 World RX of Norway.

==== Supercar ====
Year	Entrant	Car	No.	Driver	1	2	3	4	5	ERX	Points
2014	EKS RX	Audi S1	5	(Sweden) Pontus Tidemand	GBR	NOR; 6	BEL; 2	GER; 4	ITA; 6	3rd	50
2014	EKS RX	Audi S1	10	(Sweden) Mattias Ekström	GBR	NOR; 11	BEL	GER; 1	ITA	10th	22
2014	EKS RX	Audi S1	79	(Sweden) Edward Sandström	GBR	NOR	BEL; 5	GER	ITA; 12	14th	17

=== Complete FIA World Rallycross Championship results ===
(key)

==== Supercar ====
Year	Entrant	Car	No.	Driver	1	2	3	4	5	6	7	8	9	10	11	12	13	WRX	Points	Teams	Points
2014	EKS RX	Audi S1	5	(Sweden) Pontus Tidemand	POR	GBR	NOR; 13	FIN; 13	SWE; 10	BEL; 5	CAN	FRA; 5	GER; 4	ITA; 13	TUR	ARG		8th	84	N/A	N/A
2014	EKS RX	Audi S1	10	(Sweden) Mattias Ekström	POR	GBR	NOR; 19	FIN	SWE; 1	BEL	CAN	FRA	GER; 2	ITA	TUR	ARG		11th	55	N/A	N/A
2014	EKS RX	Audi S1	79	(Sweden) Edward Sandström	POR	GBR	NOR	FIN	SWE	BEL; 12	CAN	FRA; 14	GER	ITA; 20	TUR; 12	ARG		11th	55	N/A	N/A
2014	EKS RX	Audi S1	80	(Germany) Markus Winkelhock	POR	GBR	NOR	FIN; 24	SWE	BEL	CAN	FRA	GER	ITA	TUR	ARG		57th	0	N/A	N/A
2014	EKS RX	Audi S1	100	(Sweden) Per-Gunnar Andersson	POR	GBR	NOR	FIN	SWE	BEL	CAN	FRA	GER	ITA	TUR; 13	ARG		37th	8	N/A	N/A
2015	EKS RX	Audi S1	5	(Sweden) Edward Sandström	POR	HOC; 13	BEL	GBR	GER	SWE	CAN	NOR	FRA	BAR	TUR	ITA	ARG	28th	4	5th	258
2015	EKS RX	Audi S1	10	(Sweden) Mattias Ekström	POR; 7	HOC	BEL; 6	GBR; 2	GER; 15	SWE; 1	CAN; 6	NOR; 12	FRA; 5	BAR; 7	TUR; 4	ITA	ARG; 2	6th	201	5th	258
2015	EKS RX	Audi S1	92	(Sweden) Anton Marklund	POR; 17	HOC; 20	BEL; 7	GBR; 14	GER; 10	SWE; 25		NOR; 8	FRA; 9	BAR; 15	TUR; 6	ITA; 4	ARG; 11	12th	78	5th	258
2015	EKS RX	Volkswagen Polo	92	(Sweden) Anton Marklund							CAN; 14							12th	78	5th	258
2015	EKS RX	Audi S1	177	(United Kingdom) Andrew Jordan	POR	HOC	BEL	GBR	GER	SWE	CAN	NOR	FRA	BAR	TUR	ITA; 21	ARG	24th	13	5th	258
2016	EKS RX	Audi S1	5	(Sweden) Mattias Ekström	POR; 7	HOC; 1	BEL; 1	GBR; 1	NOR; 3	SWE; 6	CAN; 8	FRA; 7	BAR; 1	LAT; 2	GER; 5	ARG; 5		1st	272	1st	422
2016	EKS RX	Audi S1	57	(Finland) Toomas Heikkinen	POR; 3	HOC; 2	BEL; 16	GBR; 11	NOR; 9	SWE; 9	CAN; 4	FRA; 15	BAR; 9	LAT; 9	GER; 9	ARG; 3		7th	150	1st	422
2017	EKS RX	Audi S1	1	(Sweden) Mattias Ekström	BAR; 1	POR; 1	HOC; 1	BEL; 4	GBR; 5	NOR; 4	SWE	CAN; 7	FRA; 3	LAT; 2	GER; 1	RSA; 3		2nd	255	3rd	380
2017	EKS RX	Audi S1	15	(Latvia) Reinis Nitišs	BAR; 10	POR; 5	HOC; 12	BEL; 13	GBR; 16	NOR; 10	SWE; 18	CAN; 16	FRA; 12	LAT; 11	GER; 12	RSA; 18		14th	71	3rd	380
2017	EKS RX	Audi S1	57	(Finland) Toomas Heikkinen	BAR; 8	POR; 12	HOC; 6	BEL; 9	GBR; 12	NOR; 11	SWE; 14	CAN; 5	FRA; 11	LAT; 8	GER; 3	RSA; 11		7th	125	3rd	380
2017	EKS RX	Audi S1	45	(Sweden) Per-Gunnar Andersson	BAR	POR	HOC	BEL	GBR	NOR	SWE; 15	CAN	FRA	LAT	GER	RSA		23rd	2	N/A	N/A
2017	EKS RX	Audi S1	51	(Switzerland) Nico Müller	BAR	POR	HOC	BEL	GBR	NOR	SWE	CAN	FRA; 17	LAT; 6	GER	RSA		17th	13	N/A	N/A
2018	EKS Audi Sport	Audi S1	5	(Sweden) Mattias Ekström	BAR; 6	POR; 7	BEL; 5	GBR; 4	NOR; 2	SWE; 6	CAN; 4	FRA; 4	LAT; 2	USA; 5	GER; 2	RSA; 2		2nd	248	2nd	485
2018	EKS Audi Sport	Audi S1	13	(Norway) Andreas Bakkerud	BAR; 3	POR; 4	BEL; 6	GBR; 2	NOR; 6	SWE; 2	CAN; 7	FRA; 2	LAT; 8	USA; 3	GER; 3	RSA; 7		3rd	237	2nd	485
2018	EKS Audi Sport	Audi S1	51	(Switzerland) Nico Müller	BAR	POR	BEL	GBR	NOR	SWE	CAN	FRA	LAT; 9	USA	GER	RSA		19th	10	N/A	N/A
2019	EKS Audi Sport	Audi S1	40	(Sweden) Mattias Ekström	ABU	BAR	BEL; 11	GBR	NOR	SWE	CAN	FRA	LAT	RSA				22nd	8	N/A	N/A
2019	EKS Sport	Audi S1	123	(Hungary) Krisztián Szabó	ABU; 4	BAR; 12	BEL; 12	GBR; 5	NOR; 12	SWE; 17	CAN; 10	FRA; 9	LAT; 10	RSA; 9				10th	91	N/A	N/A
