= Peugeot 3008 DKR =

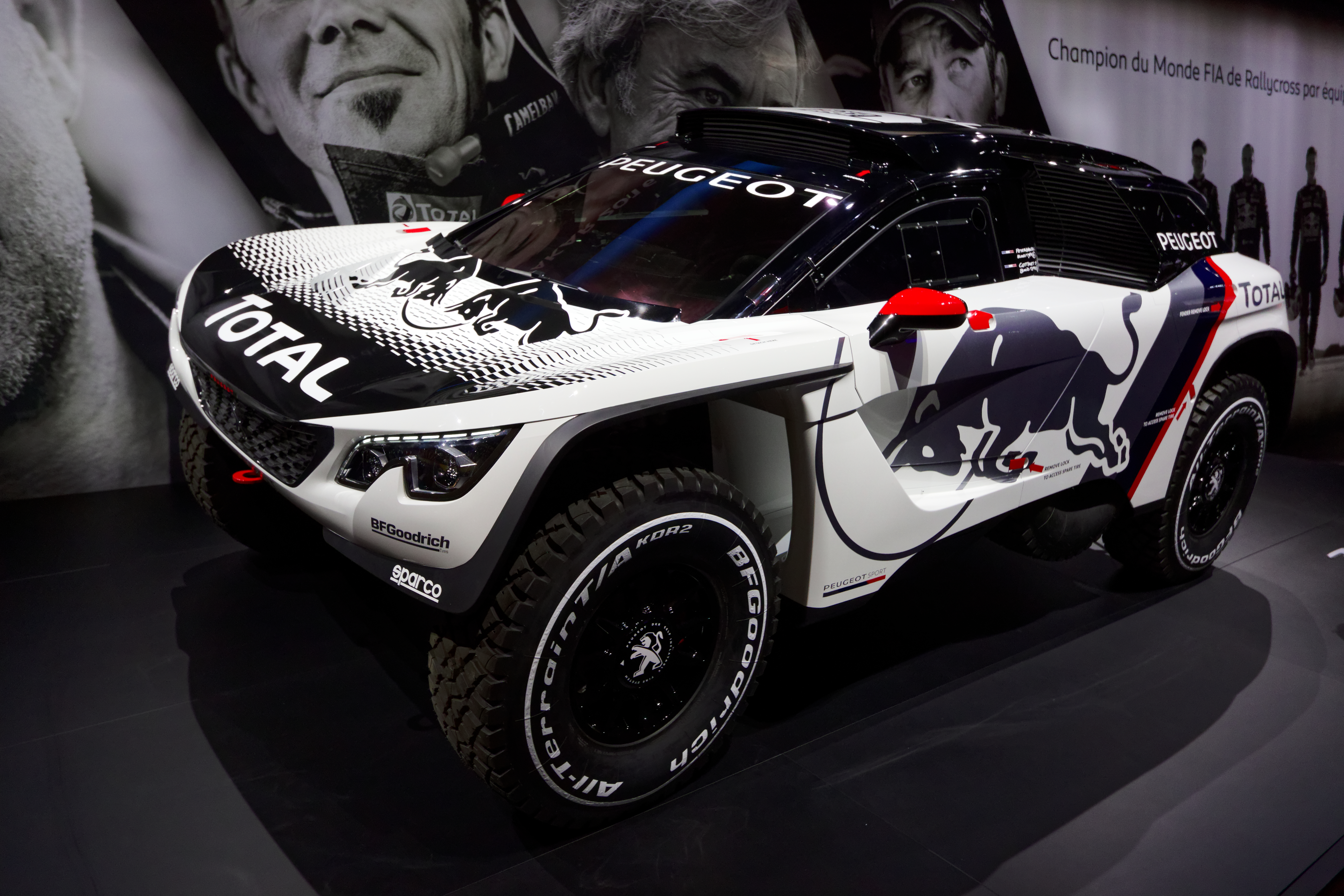

Overview
- Manufacturer: Peugeot
- Production: 2017
- Designer: Sébastien Criquet

Body and chassis
- Class: Rally raid
- Layout: 2-wheel drive (RWD)

Powertrain
- Engine: 3.0 L PSA HDi Twin Turbo V6 (Diesel)
- Transmission: 6-Speed Sequential manual

Dimensions
- Wheelbase: 3,000 mm (118.1 in)
- Length: 4,312 mm (169.8 in)
- Width: 2,400 mm (94.5 in)
- Height: 1,799 mm (70.8 in)

Chronology
- Predecessor: Peugeot 2008 DKR

The Peugeot 3008 DKR is an off-road competition car specially designed to take part in rally raids with the main objective of winning the Dakar Rally. The team is Team Peugeot Total.

== Engine Specifications ==
Engine	
Fuel	Diesel
Power	340 bhp (253.5 kW)
Torque	800 N⋅m (590 lbf⋅ft)
BHP/Liter	114 bhp / liter

== Dakar victories ==
Year	Driver	Co-driver
2017	(France) Stéphane Peterhansel	(France) Jean-Paul Cottret
2018	(Spain) Carlos Sainz	(Spain) Lucas Cruz

== See also ==
- Peugeot 3008
