= 2018 World RX of Great Britain =

Rallycross event

- Round 4 of 12 in the 2018 FIA World Rallycross Championship
- Date: 25–27 May 2018
- Location: Silverstone, Northamptonshire
- Venue: Silverstone Circuit

Results
Heat winners
- Heat 1: (Norway) Petter Solberg; PSRX Volkswagen Sweden
- Heat 2: (Sweden) Timmy Hansen; Team Peugeot Total
- Heat 3: Johan Kristoffersson; PSRX Volkswagen Sweden
- Heat 4: Johan Kristoffersson; PSRX Volkswagen Sweden
Semi-final winners
- Semi-final 1: Johan Kristoffersson; PSRX Volkswagen Sweden
- Semi-final 2: (France) Sébastien Loeb; Team Peugeot Total
Final
- First: Johan Kristoffersson; PSRX Volkswagen Sweden
- Second: (Norway) Andreas Bakkerud; EKS Audi Sport
- Third: (France) Sébastien Loeb; Team Peugeot Total

World RX layout of Silverstone Circuit, used in 2018-2019

The 2018 World RX of Great Britain was the fourth round of the fifth season of the FIA World Rallycross Championship. The event was held at Silverstone Circuit in Silverstone, Northamptonshire.

== Qualifying ==
Pos.	No.	Driver	Team	Car	Q1	Q2	Q3	Q4	Pts
1	1	(Sweden) Johan Kristoffersson	PSRX Volkswagen Sweden	Volkswagen Polo R	4th	6th	1st	1st	16
2	9	(France) Sébastien Loeb	Team Peugeot Total	Peugeot 208	3rd	7th	2nd	2nd	15
3	11	(Norway) Petter Solberg	PSRX Volkswagen Sweden	Volkswagen Polo R	1st	3rd	4th	10th	14
4	5	(Sweden) Mattias Ekström	EKS Audi Sport	Audi S1	2nd	2nd	5th	8th	13
5	13	(Norway) Andreas Bakkerud	EKS Audi Sport	Audi S1	5th	4th	7th	3rd	12
6	21	(Sweden) Timmy Hansen	Team Peugeot Total	Peugeot 208	7th	1st	3rd	20th	11
7	71	(Sweden) Kevin Hansen	Team Peugeot Total	Peugeot 208	8th	5th	8th	5th	10
8	68	(Finland) Niclas Grönholm	GRX Taneco Team	Hyundai i20	6th	8th	6th	7th	9
9	96	(Sweden) Kevin Eriksson	Olsbergs MSE	Ford Fiesta	11th	10th	10th	4th	8
10	74	(France) Jérôme Grosset-Janin	GC Kompetition	Renault Mégane RS	12th	9th	9th	6th	7
11	24	(Norway) Tommy Rustad	Marklund Motorsport	Volkswagen Polo R	13th	11th	12th	9th	6
12	7	(Russia) Timur Timerzyanov	GRX Taneco Team	Hyundai i20	9th	13th	14th	13th	5
13	4	(Sweden) Robin Larsson	Olsbergs MSE	Ford Fiesta	16th	12th	11th	17th	4
14	6	(Latvia) Jānis Baumanis	STARD	Ford Fiesta	14th	14th	23rd	11th	3
15	36	(France) Guerlain Chicherit	GC Kompetition	Renault Mégane RS	15th	16th	17th	15th	2
16	134	(United Kingdom) Mark Higgins	Mark Higgins	Peugeot 208	10th	22nd	18th	12th	1
17	92	(Sweden) Anton Marklund	Marklund Motorsport	Volkswagen Polo R	21st	15th	15th	16th	
18	66	(France) Grégoire Demoustier	Sébastien Loeb Racing	Peugeot 208	18th	18th	19th	14th	
19	102	(Hungary) Tamás Kárai	Kárai Motorsport Egyesület	Audi A1	17th	19th	16th	22nd	
20	177	(United Kingdom) Andrew Jordan	MJP Racing Team Austria	Ford Fiesta	23rd	17th	13th	23rd	
21	42	(United Kingdom) Oliver Bennett	Oliver Bennett	MINI Cooper	19th	20th	20th	21st	
22	84	(France) "Knapick"	"Knapick"	Citroën DS3	22nd	21st	22nd	19th	
23	58	(China) Qinghua Ma	STARD	Ford Fiesta	20th	23rd	21st	18th	

== Semi-finals ==
=== Semi-final 1 ===
Pos.	No.	Driver	Team	Time/retired	Pts
1	1	(Sweden) Johan Kristoffersson	PSRX Volkswagen Sweden	4:07.553	6
2	13	(Norway) Andreas Bakkerud	EKS Audi Sport	+1.111	5
3	71	(Sweden) Kevin Hansen	Team Peugeot Total	+2.082	4
4	24	(Norway) Tommy Rustad	Marklund Motorsport	+5.613	3
5	96	(Sweden) Kevin Eriksson	Olsbergs MSE	+6.872	2
6	11	(Norway) Petter Solberg	PSRX Volkswagen Sweden	DNF	1

=== Semi-final 2 ===
Pos.	No.	Driver	Team	Time/retired	Pts
1	9	(France) Sébastien Loeb	Team Peugeot Total	4:02.466	6
2	5	(Sweden) Mattias Ekström	EKS Audi Sport	+0.511	5
3	68	(Finland) Niclas Grönholm	GRX Taneco Team	+6.721	4
4	74	(France) Jérôme Grosset-Janin	GC Kompetition	+9.546	3
5	7	(Russia) Timur Timerzyanov	GRX Taneco Team	+10.369	2
6	21	(Sweden) Timmy Hansen	Team Peugeot Total	DNF	1

== Final ==
Pos.	No.	Driver	Team	Time/retired	Pts
1	1	(Sweden) Johan Kristoffersson	PSRX Volkswagen Sweden	4:00.899	8
2	13	(Norway) Andreas Bakkerud	EKS Audi Sport	+0.859	5
3	9	(France) Sébastien Loeb	Team Peugeot Total	+1.346	4
4	5	(Sweden) Mattias Ekström	EKS Audi Sport	+1.949	3
5	68	(Finland) Niclas Grönholm	GRX Taneco Team	+3.832	2
6	71	(Sweden) Kevin Hansen	Team Peugeot Total	+29.983	1

== Standings after the event ==
Pos	Driver	Pts	Gap
1	(Sweden) Johan Kristoffersson	105	
2	(France) Sébastien Loeb	91	+14
3	(Norway) Andreas Bakkerud	83	+22
4	(Norway) Petter Solberg	80	+25
4	(Sweden) Mattias Ekström	80	+25

- Note: Only the top five positions are included.

Previous race: 2018 World RX of Belgium	FIA World Rallycross Championship; 2018 season	Next race: 2018 World RX of Norway
Previous race: 2017 World RX of Great Britain	World RX of Great Britain	Next race: Incumbent
