= 2018 World RX of Sweden =

Rallycross event

- Round 6 of 12 in the 2018 FIA World Rallycross Championship
- Date: 29 June–1 July 2018
- Location: Höljes, Värmland
- Venue: Höljesbanan

Results
Heat winners
- Heat 1: Johan Kristoffersson; PSRX Volkswagen Sweden
- Heat 2: Johan Kristoffersson; PSRX Volkswagen Sweden
- Heat 3: (Norway) Petter Solberg; PSRX Volkswagen Sweden
- Heat 4: Johan Kristoffersson; PSRX Volkswagen Sweden
Semi-final winners
- Semi-final 1: Johan Kristoffersson; PSRX Volkswagen Sweden
- Semi-final 2: (Norway) Andreas Bakkerud; EKS Audi Sport
Final
- First: Johan Kristoffersson; PSRX Volkswagen Sweden
- Second: (Norway) Andreas Bakkerud; EKS Audi Sport
- Third: (France) Jérôme Grosset-Janin; GC Kompetition

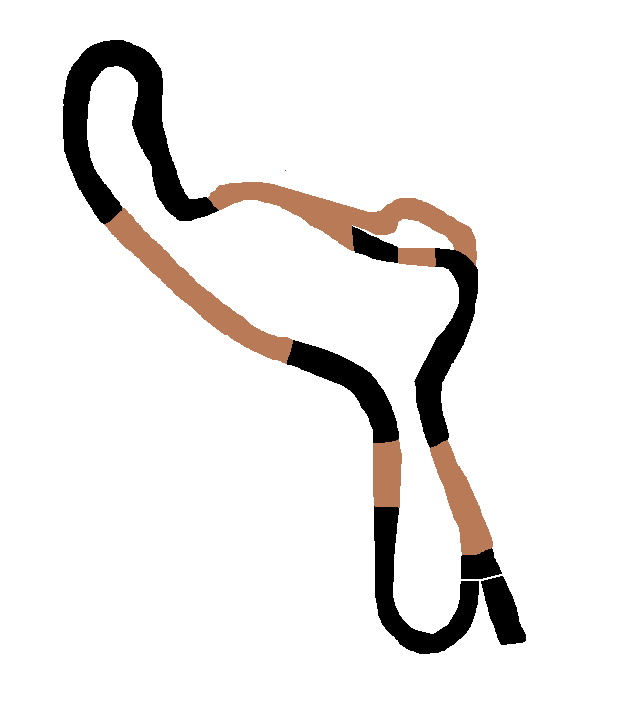
Rallycross layout of the Höljesbanan

The 2018 World RX of Sweden was the sixth round of the fifth season of the FIA World Rallycross Championship. The event was held at the Höljesbanan in the village of Höljes, Värmland.

== Qualifying ==
Pos.	No.	Driver	Team	Car	Q1	Q2	Q3	Q4	Pts
1	1	(Sweden) Johan Kristoffersson	PSRX Volkswagen Sweden	Volkswagen Polo R	1st	1st	3rd	1st	16
2	11	(Norway) Petter Solberg	PSRX Volkswagen Sweden	Volkswagen Polo R	6th	2nd	1st	2nd	15
3	21	(Sweden) Timmy Hansen	Team Peugeot Total	Peugeot 208	3rd	3rd	2nd	3rd	14
4	13	(Norway) Andreas Bakkerud	EKS Audi Sport	Audi S1	2nd	4th	4th	10th	13
5	5	(Sweden) Mattias Ekström	EKS Audi Sport	Audi S1	4th	5th	5th	4th	12
6	7	(Russia) Timur Timerzyanov	GRX Taneco	Hyundai i20	7th	6th	6th	5th	11
7	9	(France) Sébastien Loeb	Team Peugeot Total	Peugeot 208	5th	7th	16th	6th	10
8	71	(Sweden) Kevin Hansen	Team Peugeot Total	Peugeot 208	10th	8th	8th	9th	9
9	6	(Latvia) Jānis Baumanis	Team STARD	Ford Fiesta	8th	10th	7th	15th	8
10	74	(France) Jérôme Grosset-Janin	GC Kompetition	Renault Mégane RS	11th	9th	13th	8th	7
11	68	(Finland) Niclas Grönholm	GRX Taneco	Hyundai i20	15th	11th	11th	7th	6
12	4	(Sweden) Robin Larsson	Olsbergs MSE	Ford Fiesta	9th	12th	9th	14th	5
13	96	(Sweden) Kevin Eriksson	Olsbergs MSE	Ford Fiesta	12th	13th	10th	11th	4
14	36	(France) Guerlain Chicherit	GC Kompetition	Renault Mégane RS	13th	15th	12th	16th	3
15	42	(United Kingdom) Oliver Bennett	Oliver Bennett	BMW Mini Cooper	16th	14th	14th	13th	2
16	66	(France) Grégoire Demoustier	Sébastien Loeb Racing	Peugeot 208	17th	16th	17th	12th	1
17	44	(Germany) Timo Scheider	ALL-INKL.COM Münnich Motorsport	SEAT Ibiza	14th	17th	15th	17th	

== Semi-finals ==
Semi-final 1

Pos.	No.	Driver	Team	Time/Retired	Pts
1	1	(Sweden) Johan Kristoffersson	PSRX Volkswagen Sweden	4:14.708	6
2	21	(Sweden) Timmy Hansen	Team Peugeot Total	+1.887	5
3	5	(Sweden) Mattias Ekström	EKS Audi Sport	+2.695	4
4	9	(France) Sébastien Loeb	Team Peugeot Total	+3.063	3
5	6	(Latvia) Jānis Baumanis	Team STARD	+6.325	2
6	68	(Finland) Niclas Grönholm	GRX Taneco	+32.282	1

Semi-final 2

Pos.	No.	Driver	Team	Time/Retired	Pts
1	13	(Norway) Andreas Bakkerud	EKS Audi Sport	4:20.819	6
2	71	(Sweden) Kevin Hansen	Team Peugeot Total	+2.940	5
3	74	(France) Jérôme Grosset-Janin	GC Kompetition	+6.981	4
4	7	(Russia) Timur Timerzyanov	GRX Taneco	+13.094	3
5	11	(Norway) Petter Solberg	PSRX Volkswagen Sweden	DNF	2
6	4	(Sweden) Robin Larsson	Olsbergs MSE	DNF	1

== Final ==
Pos.	No.	Driver	Team	Time/Retired	Pts
1	1	(Sweden) Johan Kristoffersson	PSRX Volkswagen Sweden	4:14.969	8
2	13	(Norway) Andreas Bakkerud	EKS Audi Sport	+2.977	5
3	74	(France) Jérôme Grosset-Janin	GC Kompetition	+5.956	4
4	21	(Sweden) Timmy Hansen	Team Peugeot Total	DNF	3
5	71	(Sweden) Kevin Hansen	Team Peugeot Total	DNF	2
6	5	(Sweden) Mattias Ekström	EKS Audi Sport	+4.269^{1}	1

*^1 — Mattias Ekström finished third but was later penalised for a final lap incident with Timmy Hansen

== Standings after the event ==
Pos	Driver	Pts	Gap
1	(Sweden) Johan Kristoffersson	165	
2	(Norway) Andreas Bakkerud	125	+40
3	(Norway) Petter Solberg	119	+46
4	(France) Sébastien Loeb	117	+48
5	(Sweden) Timmy Hansen	116	+49

- Note: Only the top five positions are included.

Previous race: 2018 World RX of Norway	FIA World Rallycross Championship; 2018 season	Next race: 2018 World RX of Canada
Previous race: 2017 World RX of Sweden	World RX of Sweden	Next race: 2019 World RX of Sweden
