= Peugeot 2008 DKR =

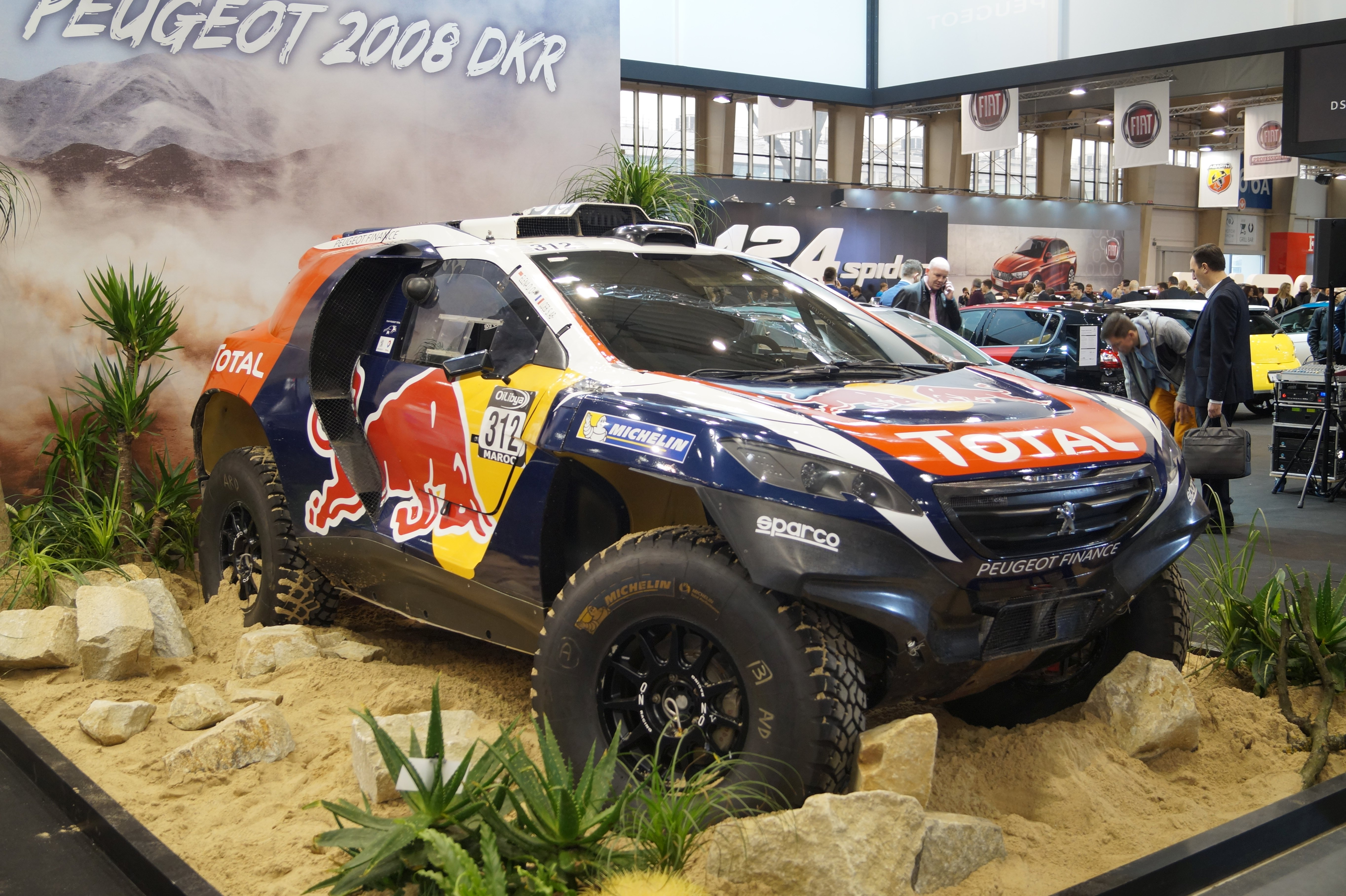

Overview
- Manufacturer: Peugeot
- Production: 2015-2016
- Designer: Giovanni Rizzo

Body and chassis
- Class: Rally raid
- Layout: 2-wheel drive (RWD)

Powertrain
- Engine: 3.0 L PSA HDi Twin Turbo V6 (Diesel)
- Transmission: 6-speed sequential manual

Chronology
- Successor: Peugeot 3008 DKR

The Peugeot 2008 DKR is an off-road competition car specially designed to take part in the rally raids with the main objective of winning the Dakar Rally.

== Engine specifications ==
Engine	
Fuel	Diesel
Power	340 bhp (254 kW)
Torque	800 N⋅m (590 lbf⋅ft)
BHP/Liter	114 bhp / liter

== Dakar victories ==
Year	Driver	Co-driver
2016	(France) Stéphane Peterhansel	(France) Jean-Paul Cottret

== See also ==
- Peugeot 2008
