= 2018 World RX of USA =

Automobile racing championship

- Round 10 of 12 in the 2018 FIA World Rallycross Championship
- Date: 29-30 September 2018
- Location: Austin, Texas, USA
- Venue: Circuit of the Americas

Results
Heat winners
- Heat 1: (Norway) Petter Solberg; PSRX Volkswagen Sweden
- Heat 2: (Norway) Petter Solberg; PSRX Volkswagen Sweden
- Heat 3: (Sweden) Mattias Ekström; EKS Audi Sport
- Heat 4: Johan Kristoffersson; PSRX Volkswagen Sweden
Semi-final winners
- Semi-final 1: (Norway) Petter Solberg; PSRX Volkswagen Sweden
- Semi-final 2: (Sweden) Mattias Ekström; EKS Audi Sport
Final
- First: Johan Kristoffersson; PSRX Volkswagen Sweden
- Second: (Norway) Petter Solberg; PSRX Volkswagen Sweden
- Third: (Norway) Andreas Bakkerud; EKS Audi Sport

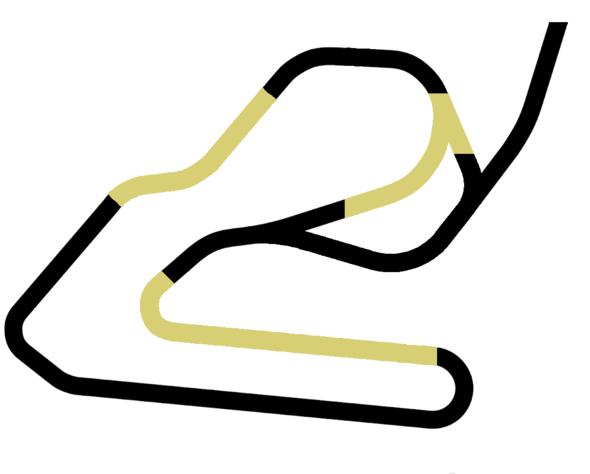
World RX layout of Circuit of the Americas

The 2018 World RX of the United States was the tenth round of the fifth season of the FIA World Rallycross Championship. The event was held at the Circuit of the Americas, in Austin, Texas.

== Supercar ==
=== Heats ===
Pos.	No.	Driver	Team	Car	Q1	Q2	Q3	Q4	Pts
1	11	(Norway) Petter Solberg	PSRX Volkswagen Sweden	Volkswagen Polo	1st	1st	2nd	4th	16
2	5	(Sweden) Mattias Ekström	EKS Audi Sport	Audi S1	2nd	6th	1st	2nd	15
3	1	(Sweden) Johan Kristoffersson	PSRX Volkswagen Sweden	Volkswagen Polo	13th	2nd	3rd	1st	14
4	71	(Sweden) Kevin Hansen	Team Peugeot Total	Peugeot 208	8th	3rd	6th	7th	13
5	9	(France) Sébastien Loeb	Team Peugeot Total	Peugeot 208	3rd	12th	4th	6th	12
6	13	(Norway) Andreas Bakkerud	EKS Audi Sport	Audi S1	5th	4th	10th	3rd	11
7	68	(Finland) Niclas Grönholm	GRX Taneco Team	Hyundai i20	10th	5th	8th	10th	10
8	96	(Sweden) Kevin Eriksson	Olsbergs MSE	Ford Fiesta	6th	9th	9th	15th	9
9	36	(France) Guerlain Chicherit	GC Kompetition	Renault Mégane RS	15th	7th	5th	8th	8
10	21	(Sweden) Timmy Hansen	Team Peugeot Total	Peugeot 208	4th	8th	15th	5th	7
11	92	(Sweden) Anton Marklund	GC Kompetition	Renault Mégane RS	7th	11th	12th	12th	6
12	6	(Latvia) Janis Baumanis	Team Stard	Ford Fiesta	11th	13th	7th	9th	5
13	7	(Russia) Timur Timerzyanov	GRX Taneco Team	Hyundai i20	9th	10th	13th	13th	4
14	4	(Sweden) Robin Larsson	Olsbergs MSE	Ford Fiesta	12th	15th	11th	11th	3
15	66	(Belgium) Gregoire Demoustier	Sébastien Loeb Racing	Peugeot 208	14th	14th	14th	14th	2

=== Semi-finals ===
Semi-Final 1

Pos.	No.	Driver	Team	Time	Pts
1	11	(Norway) Petter Solberg	PSRX Volkswagen Sweden	3:31.732	6
2	1	(Sweden) Johan Kristoffersson	PSRX Volkswagen Sweden	+0.457	5
3	21	(Sweden) Timmy Hansen	Team Peugeot Total	+1.517	4
4	71	(Sweden) Kevin Hansen	Team Peugeot Total	+2.898	3
5	6	(Latvia) Janis Baumanis	Team Stard	+6.941	2
6	36	(France) Guerlain Chicherit	GC Kompetition	+16.145	1

Semi-Final 2

Pos.	No.	Driver	Team	Time	Pts
1	5	(Sweden) Mattias Ekström	EKS Audi Sport	3:30.822	6
2	9	(France) Sébastien Loeb	Team Peugeot Total	+0.465	5
3	13	(Norway) Andreas Bakkerud	EKS Audi Sport	+1.292	4
4	68	(Finland) Niclas Grönholm	GRX Taneco Team	+1.605	3
5	96	(Sweden) Kevin Eriksson	Olsbergs MSE	+3.589	2
6	92	(Sweden) Anton Marklund	GC Kompetition	+3.986	1

=== Final ===
Pos.	No.	Driver	Team	Time	Pts
1	1	(Sweden) Johan Kristoffersson	PSRX Volkswagen Sweden	3:31.118	8
2	11	(Norway) Petter Solberg	PSRX Volkswagen Sweden	+0.600	5
3	13	(Norway) Andreas Bakkerud	EKS Audi Sport	+1.695	4
4	9	(France) Sébastien Loeb	Team Peugeot Total	+2.323	3
5	5	(Sweden) Mattias Ekström	EKS Audi Sport	+8.069	2
6	21	(Sweden) Timmy Hansen	Team Peugeot Total	+9.836	1

== Standings after the event ==
Pos.	Driver	Pts	Gap
WC	(Sweden) Johan Kristoffersson	281	
2	(Sweden) Mattias Ekström	204	+77
3	(Norway) Petter Solberg	202	+79
4	(Norway) Andreas Bakkerud	200	+81
5	(France) Sébastien Loeb	195	+86

- Note: Only the top five positions are included.

Previous race: 2018 World RX of Latvia	FIA World Rallycross Championship; 2018 season	Next race: 2018 World RX of Germany
Previous race: -	World RX of USA	Next race: -
