= 2018 World RX of Norway =

Rallycross championship event

- Round 5 of 12 in the 2018 FIA World Rallycross Championship
- Date: 8–10 June 2018
- Location: Hell, Nord-Trøndelag
- Venue: Lånkebanen

Results
Heat winners
- Heat 1: Johan Kristoffersson; PSRX Volkswagen Sweden
- Heat 2: Johan Kristoffersson; PSRX Volkswagen Sweden
- Heat 3: Johan Kristoffersson; PSRX Volkswagen Sweden
- Heat 4: Johan Kristoffersson; PSRX Volkswagen Sweden
Semi-final winners
- Semi-final 1: Johan Kristoffersson; PSRX Volkswagen Sweden
- Semi-final 2: (Sweden) Timmy Hansen; Team Peugeot Total
Final
- First: Johan Kristoffersson; PSRX Volkswagen Sweden
- Second: (Sweden) Mattias Ekström; EKS Audi Sport
- Third: (Norway) Petter Solberg; PSRX Volkswagen Sweden

World RX layout of Lånkebanen

The 2018 World RX of Norway was the fifth round of the fifth season of the FIA World Rallycross Championship. The event was held at the Lånkebanen near Hell, Nord-Trøndelag.

== Qualifying ==
Pos.	No.	Driver	Team	Car	Q1	Q2	Q3	Q4	Pts
1	1	(Sweden) Johan Kristoffersson	PSRX Volkswagen Sweden	Volkswagen Polo R	1st	1st	1st	1st	16
2	21	(Sweden) Timmy Hansen	Team Peugeot Total	Peugeot 208	6th	5th	2nd	2nd	15
3	11	(Norway) Petter Solberg	PSRX Volkswagen Sweden	Volkswagen Polo R	3rd	4th	3rd	8th	14
4	71	(Sweden) Kevin Hansen	Team Peugeot Total	Peugeot 208	5th	6th	4th	5th	13
5	13	(Norway) Andreas Bakkerud	EKS Audi Sport	Audi S1	7th	8th	5th	3rd	12
6	68	(Finland) Niclas Grönholm	GRX Taneco Team	Hyundai i20	9th	7th	6th	4th	11
7	9	(France) Sébastien Loeb	Team Peugeot Total	Peugeot 208	2nd	3rd	23rd	6th	10
8	96	(Sweden) Kevin Eriksson	Olsbergs MSE	Ford Fiesta	11th	9th	10th	10th	9
9	4	(Sweden) Robin Larsson	Olsbergs MSE	Ford Fiesta	10th	10th	12th	12th	8
10	5	(Sweden) Mattias Ekström	EKS Audi Sport	Audi S1	8th	2nd	14th	22nd	7
11	92	(Sweden) Anton Marklund	Marklund Motorsport	Volkswagen Polo	13th	13th	8th	13th	6
12	6	(Latvia) Jānis Baumanis	Team STARD	Ford Fiesta	12th	20th	9th	7th	5
13	24	(Norway) Tommy Rustad	Marklund - HTB Racing	Volkswagen Polo	17th	12th	13th	9th	4
14	74	(France) Jérôme Grosset-Janin	GC Kompetition	Renault Mégane RS	21st	11th	11th	14th	3
15	36	(France) Guerlain Chicherit	GC Kompetition	Renault Mégane RS	20th	14th	17th	11th	2
16	60	(Finland) Joni-Pekka Rajala	Team STARD	Ford Fiesta	14th	15th	16th	18th	1
17	77	(Germany) René Münnich	ALL-INKL.COM Münnich Motorsport	SEAT Ibiza	15th	21st	15th	15th	
18	32	(Austria) Alex Wurz	MJP Racing Team Austria	Ford Fiesta	18th	19th	18th	16th	
19	64	(Norway) Kjetil Larsen	Kjetil Larsen	Volkswagen Polo	19th	17th	19th	17th	
20	42	(United Kingdom) Oliver Bennett	Oliver Bennett	BMW Mini Cooper	16th	18th	20th	20th	
21	7	(Russia) Timur Timerzyanov	GRX Taneco Team	Hyundai i20	4th	22nd	7th	23rd	
22	66	(France) Grégoire Demoustier	Sébastien Loeb Racing	Peugeot 208	23rd	16th	21st	19th	
23	31	(Austria) Max Pucher	MJP Racing Team Austria	Ford Fiesta	22nd	23rd	22nd	21st	

== Semi-finals ==
Semi-final 1

Pos.	No.	Driver	Team	Time/Retired	Pts
1	1	(Sweden) Johan Kristoffersson	PSRX Volkswagen Sweden	3:56.105	6
2	13	(Norway) Andreas Bakkerud	EKS Audi Sport	+1.906	5
3	11	(Norway) Petter Solberg	PSRX Volkswagen Sweden	+2.539	4
4	9	(France) Sébastien Loeb	Team Peugeot Total	+2.925	3
5	4	(Sweden) Robin Larsson	Olsbergs MSE	+4.108	2
6	92	(Sweden) Anton Marklund	Marklund Motorsport	+5.471	1

Semi-final 2

Pos.	No.	Driver	Team	Time/Retired	Pts
1	21	(Sweden) Timmy Hansen	Team Peugeot Total	3:57.405	6
2	5	(Sweden) Mattias Ekström	EKS Audi Sport	+0.469	5
3	71	(Sweden) Kevin Hansen	Team Peugeot Total	+0.988	4
4	68	(Finland) Niclas Grönholm	GRX Taneco Team	+1.770	3
5	96	(Sweden) Kevin Eriksson	Olsbergs MSE	+3.476	2
6	6	(Latvia) Jānis Baumanis	Team STARD	+3.871	1

== Final ==
Pos.	No.	Driver	Team	Time/Retired	Pts
1	1	(Sweden) Johan Kristoffersson	PSRX Volkswagen Sweden	3:54.906	8
2	5	(Sweden) Mattias Ekström	EKS Audi Sport	+0.788	5
3	11	(Norway) Petter Solberg	PSRX Volkswagen Sweden	+2.516	4
4	71	(Sweden) Kevin Hansen	Team Peugeot Total	+3.665	3
5	21	(Sweden) Timmy Hansen	Team Peugeot Total	+9.302	2
6	13	(Norway) Andreas Bakkerud	EKS Audi Sport	+11.257	1

== Standings after the event ==
Pos	Driver	Pts	Gap
1	(Sweden) Johan Kristoffersson	135	
2	(France) Sébastien Loeb	104	+31
3	(Norway) Petter Solberg	102	+33
4	(Norway) Andreas Bakkerud	101	+34
5	(Sweden) Mattias Ekström	97	+38

- Note: Only the top five positions are included.

Previous race: 2018 World RX of Great Britain	FIA World Rallycross Championship; 2018 season	Next race: 2018 World RX of Sweden
Previous race: 2017 World RX of Norway	World RX of Norway	Next race: Incumbent
