= 2018 World RX of Canada =

Rallycross event

- Round 7 of 12 in the 2018 FIA World Rallycross Championship
- Date: 4 - 5 August 2018
- Location: Trois-Rivières, Quebec
- Venue: Circuit Trois-Rivières

Results
Heat winners
- Heat 1: (France) Sébastien Loeb; Team Peugeot Total
- Heat 2: (France) Sébastien Loeb; Team Peugeot Total
- Heat 3: Johan Kristoffersson; PSRX Volkswagen Sweden
- Heat 4: Johan Kristoffersson; PSRX Volkswagen Sweden
Semi-final winners
- Semi-final 1: Johan Kristoffersson; PSRX Volkswagen Sweden
- Semi-final 2: (Sweden) Timmy Hansen; Team Peugeot Total
Final
- First: Johan Kristoffersson; PSRX Volkswagen Sweden
- Second: (Sweden) Timmy Hansen; Team Peugeot Total
- Third: (France) Sébastien Loeb; Team Peugeot Total

World RX layout of Circuit Trois-Rivières

The 2018 World RX of Canada was the seventh round of the fifth season of the FIA World Rallycross Championship. The event was held at the Circuit Trois-Rivières in Trois-Rivières, Quebec.

== Supercar ==
=== Heats ===
Pos.	No.	Driver	Team	Car	Q1	Q2	Q3	Q4	Pts
1	1	(Sweden) Johan Kristoffersson	PSRX Volkswagen Sweden	Volkswagen Polo	10th	7th	1st	1st	16
2	9	(France) Sébastien Loeb	Team Peugeot Total	Peugeot 208	1st	1st	12th	6th	15
3	11	(Norway) Petter Solberg	PSRX Volkswagen Sweden	Volkswagen Polo	3rd	3rd	5th	3rd	14
4	21	(Sweden) Timmy Hansen	Team Peugeot Total	Peugeot 208	6th	5th	4th	2nd	13
5	5	(Sweden) Mattias Ekström	EKS Audi Sport	Audi S1	2nd	2nd	14th	4th	12
6	13	(Norway) Andreas Bakkerud	EKS Audi Sport	Audi S1	9th	4th	2nd	7th	11
7	68	(Finland) Niclas Grönholm	GRX Taneco Team	Hyundai i20	4th	8th	6th	5th	10
8	71	(Sweden) Kevin Hansen	Team Peugeot Total	Peugeot 208	5th	6th	3rd	10th	9
9	96	(Sweden) Kevin Eriksson	Olsbergs MSE	Ford Fiesta	7th	9th	8th	9th	8
10	6	(Latvia) Janis Baumanis	Team STARD	Ford Fiesta	8th	10th	7th	12th	7
11	7	(Russia) Timur Timerzyanov	GRX Taneco Team	Hyundai i20	12th	13th	13th	8th	6
12	4	(Sweden) Robin Larsson	Olsbergs MSE	Ford Fiesta	13th	11th	9th	13th	5
13	74	(France) Jérôme Grosset-Janin	GC Kompetition	Renault Mégane RS	11th	15th	10th	11th	4
14	66	(Belgium) Grégoire Demoustier	Sébastien Loeb Racing	Peugeot 208	15th	14th	11th	14th	3
15	36	(France) Guerlain Chicherit	GC Kompetition	Renault Mégane RS	14th	12th	15th	15th	2

=== Semi-finals ===
Semi-Final 1

Pos.	No.	Driver	Team	Time	Pts
1	1	(Sweden) Johan Kristoffersson	PSRX Volkswagen Sweden	5:01.714	6
2	5	(Sweden) Mattias Ekström	EKS Audi Sport	+1.130	5
3	11	(Norway) Petter Solberg	PSRX Volkswagen Sweden	+1.587	4
4	68	(Finland) Niclas Grönholm	GRX Taneco Team	+4.245	3
5	96	(Sweden) Kevin Eriksson	Olsbergs MSE	+4.785	2
6	7	(Russia) Timur Timerzyanov	GRX Taneco Team	+9.055	1

Semi-Final 2

Pos.	No.	Driver	Team	Time	Pts
1	21	(Sweden) Timmy Hansen	Team Peugeot Total	5:03.484	6
2	6	(Latvia) Janis Baumanis	Team STARD	+12.802	5
3	9	(France) Sébastien Loeb	Team Peugeot Total	+17.958	4
4	13	(Norway) Andreas Bakkerud	EKS Audi Sport	+19.337	3
5	71	(Sweden) Kevin Hansen	Team Peugeot Total	DNF	2
6	4	(Sweden) Robin Larsson	Olsbergs MSE	DNF	1

=== Final ===
Pos.	No.	Driver	Team	Time	Pts
1	1	(Sweden) Johan Kristoffersson	PSRX Volkswagen Sweden	5:00.190	8
2	21	(Sweden) Timmy Hansen	Team Peugeot Total	+0.696	5
3	9	(France) Sébastien Loeb	Team Peugeot Total	+2.147	4
4	5	(Sweden) Mattias Ekström	EKS Audi Sport	+3.366	3
5	11	(Norway) Petter Solberg	PSRX Volkswagen Sweden	+4.038	2
6	6	(Latvia) Janis Baumanis	Team STARD	+9.950	1

== Standings after the event ==
Pos	Driver	Pts	Gap
1	(Sweden) Johan Kristoffersson	195	
2	(Sweden) Timmy Hansen	140	+55
	(France) Sébastien Loeb	140	+55
4	(Norway) Andreas Bakkerud	139	+56
	(Norway) Petter Solberg	139	+56

- Note: Only the top five positions are included.

Previous race: 2018 World RX of Sweden	FIA World Rallycross Championship; 2018 season	Next race: 2018 World RX of France
Previous race: 2017 World RX of Canada	World RX of Canada	Next race: 2019 World RX of Canada
