= 2018 World RX of France =

Rallycross event

- Round 8 of 12 in the 2018 FIA World Rallycross Championship
- Date: 31 August - 1–2 September 2018
- Location: Lohéac, Bretagne
- Venue: Circuit de Lohéac

Results
Heat winners
- Heat 1: Johan Kristoffersson; PSRX Volkswagen Sweden
- Heat 2: (Sweden) Mattias Ekström; EKS Audi Sport
- Heat 3: Johan Kristoffersson; PSRX Volkswagen Sweden
- Heat 4: Johan Kristoffersson; PSRX Volkswagen Sweden
Semi-final winners
- Semi-final 1: (Sweden) Mattias Ekström; EKS Audi Sport
- Semi-final 2: (Norway) Andreas Bakkerud; EKS Audi Sport
Final
- First: Johan Kristoffersson; PSRX Volkswagen Sweden
- Second: (Norway) Andreas Bakkerud; EKS Audi Sport
- Third: (Norway) Petter Solberg; PSRX Volkswagen Sweden

World RX layout of Circuit de Lohéac

The 2018 World RX of France was the eighth round of the fifth season of the FIA World Rallycross Championship. The event was held at the Circuit de Lohéac in the Lohéac commune of Bretagne.

== Supercar ==
=== Heats ===
Pos.	No.	Driver	Team	Car	Q1	Q2	Q3	Q4	Pts
1	1	(Sweden) Johan Kristoffersson	PSRX Volkswagen Sweden	Volkswagen Polo R	1st	2nd	1st	1st	16
2	13	(Norway) Andreas Bakkerud	EKS Audi Sport	Audi S1	2nd	3rd	4th	5th	15
3	5	(Sweden) Mattias Ekström	EKS Audi Sport	Audi S1	6th	1st	3rd	8th	14
4	11	(Norway) Petter Solberg	PSRX Volkswagen Sweden	Volkswagen Polo R	3rd	7th	9th	2nd	13
5	21	(Sweden) Timmy Hansen	Team Peugeot Total	Peugeot 208	5th	6th	7th	3rd	12
6	33	(United Kingdom) Liam Doran	GC Kompetition	Renault Mégane RS	8th	11th	2nd	10th	11
7	71	(Sweden) Kevin Hansen	Team Peugeot Total	Peugeot 208	7th	10th	12th	4th	10
8	7	(Russia) Timur Timerzyanov	GRX Taneco Team	Hyundai i20	11th	12th	5th	6th	9
9	68	(Finland) Niclas Grönholm	GRX Taneco Team	Hyundai i20	9th	5th	11th	13th	8
10	96	(Sweden) Kevin Eriksson	Olsbergs MSE	Ford Fiesta	13th	4th	6th	15th	7
11	36	(France) Guerlain Chicherit	GC Kompetition	Renault Mégane RS	14th	8th	10th	7th	6
12	9	(France) Sébastien Loeb	Team Peugeot Total	Peugeot 208	4th	9th	18th	9th	5
13	6	(Latvia) Janis Baumanis	Team STARD	Ford Fiesta	10th	13th	8th	14th	4
14	57	(Finland) Toomas Heikkinen	MJP Racing Team Austria	Ford Fiesta	18th	14th	14th	11th	3
15	177	(United Kingdom) Andrew Jordan	MJP Racing Team Austria	Ford Fiesta	12th	18th	16th	12th	2
16	24	(Norway) Tommy Rustad	Marklund - HTB Racing	Volkswagen Polo	19th	17th	13th	19th	1
17	4	(Sweden) Robin Larsson	Olsbergs MSE	Ford Fiesta	20th	16th	19th	17th	
18	42	(United Kingdom) Oliver Bennett	Oliver Bennett	BMW Mini Cooper	24th	15th	17th	18th	
19	66	(Belgium) Grégoire Demoustier	Sébastien Loeb Racing	Peugeot 208	15th	24th	20th	16th	
20	17	(France) Davy Jeanney	Davy Jeanney	Peugeot 208	17th	23rd	15th	23rd	
21	62	(France) Gaëtan Sérazin	Gaëtan Sérazin	Peugeot 208	21st	20th	23rd	20th	
22	2	(Republic of Ireland) Oliver O'Donovan	Oliver O'Donovan	Ford Fiesta	22nd	19th	24th	22nd	
23	84	(France) "Knapick"	Hervé "Knapick" Lemonnier	Citroën DS3	25th	21st	21st	21st	
24	29	(France) Emmanuel Anne	Emmanuel Anne	Peugeot 208	23rd	22nd	22nd	24th	
25	44	(Germany) Timo Scheider	ALL-INKL.COM Münnich Motorsport	SEAT Ibiza	16th	25th	25th	25th	

=== Semi-finals ===
Semi-Final 1

Pos.	No.	Driver	Team	Time	Pts
1	5	(Sweden) Mattias Ekström	EKS Audi Sport	3:42.253	6
2	1	(Sweden) Johan Kristoffersson	PSRX Volkswagen Sweden	+0.315	5
3	21	(Sweden) Timmy Hansen	Team Peugeot Total	+0.953	4
4	71	(Sweden) Kevin Hansen	Team Peugeot Total	+5.231	3
5	36	(France) Guerlain Chicherit	GC Kompetition	+6.737	2
6	68	(Finland) Niclas Grönholm	GRX Taneco Team	+6.806	1

Semi-Final 2

Pos.	No.	Driver	Team	Time	Pts
1	13	(Norway) Andreas Bakkerud	EKS Audi Sport	3:44.473	6
2	9	(France) Sébastien Loeb	Team Peugeot Total	+1.412	5
3	11	(Norway) Petter Solberg	PSRX Volkswagen Sweden	+3.913	4
4	96	(Sweden) Kevin Eriksson	Olsbergs MSE	+6.303	3
5	7	(Russia) Timur Timerzyanov	GRX Taneco Team	+6.719	2
6	33	(United Kingdom) Liam Doran	GC Kompetition	+22.155	1

=== Final ===
Pos.	No.	Driver	Team	Time	Pts
1	1	(Sweden) Johan Kristoffersson	PSRX Volkswagen Sweden	3:44.787	8
2	13	(Norway) Andreas Bakkerud	EKS Audi Sport	+0.340	5
3	11	(Norway) Petter Solberg	PSRX Volkswagen Sweden	+0.784	4
4	5	(Sweden) Mattias Ekström	EKS Audi Sport	+1.158	3
5	21	(Sweden) Timmy Hansen	Team Peugeot Total	+1.423	2
6	9	(France) Sébastien Loeb	Team Peugeot Total	+1.575	1

== Standings after the event ==
Pos.	Driver	Pts	Gap
1	(Sweden) Johan Kristoffersson	224	
2	(Norway) Andreas Bakkerud	165	+59
3	(Norway) Petter Solberg	160	+64
4	(Sweden) Timmy Hansen	158	+66
5	(Sweden) Mattias Ekström	157	+67

- Note: Only the top five positions are included.

Previous race: 2018 World RX of Canada	FIA World Rallycross Championship; 2018 season	Next race: 2018 World RX of Latvia
Previous race: 2017 World RX of France	World RX of France	Next race: 2019 World RX of France
