= Volkswagen EA211 engine =

Volkswagen EA211
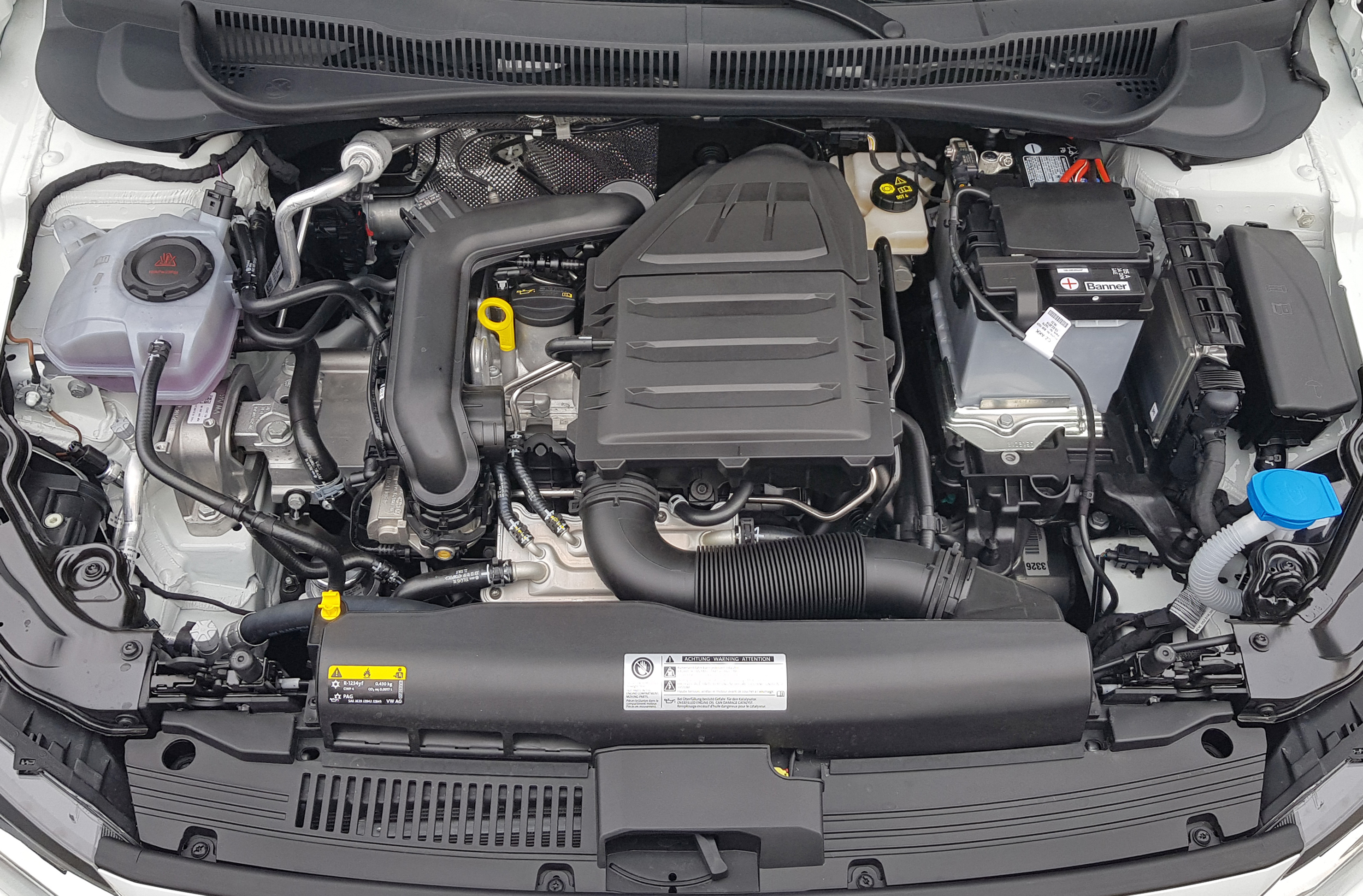
- 1.0 TSI in Volkswagen Polo VI

Overview
- Manufacturer: Volkswagen Group
- Production: 2011–present

Layout
- Configuration: 3-cylinder or 4-cylinder petrol engine
- Displacement: 1.0 L (999 cc); 1.2 L (1,198 cc); 1.4 L (1,395 cc); 1.5 L (1,498 cc) EVO; 1.6 L (1,598 cc)
- Cylinder bore: 71 mm (2.8 in); 74.5 mm (2.93 in); 76.5 mm (3.01 in)
- Piston stroke: 75.6 mm (2.98 in); 76.4 mm (3.01 in); 80 mm (3.1 in); 85.9 mm (3.38 in); 86.9 mm (3.42 in)

Output
- Power output: 44–110 kW (60–150 PS; 59–148 bhp)

Chronology
- Predecessor: Volkswagen EA111 engine

The Volkswagen EA211 engine (EA = development order), also called modular gasoline engine kit, is a family of inline-three and inline-four petrol engines with variable valve timing developed by Volkswagen Group in 2011. They all include a four-stroke engine and dual overhead camshaft drive into exhaust manifolds. By 2017, the brand introduced the upgraded EA211 called EA211 Evo, that supported regular combustion engines, mild hybrids, and plug-in hybrids. In 2023 Škoda Auto a.s. took control over EA211 development, which they have already produced in Mladá Boleslav since 2012.

== 1.0 R3 - inline-three 12v ==
Identification
Parts code prefix: 04E, ID code: CHYA, CHYB, CHZD, DSHA, CSEB, DHSB
Engine displacement & engine configuration
1.0 L (999 cc) inline three engine (R3/I3); bore x stroke: 74.5 mm × 76.4 mm (2.93 in × 3.01 in), bore spacing: 82 mm (3.2 in), stroke ratio: 0.99:1 – 'square engine', 333.1 cc (20.33 cu in) cylinder, compression ratio: 10.5:1
Cylinder block & crankcase
Cast aluminium alloy; four main bearings, die-forged steel crankshaft
Cylinder head & valvetrain
Cast aluminium alloy; four valves per cylinder, 12 valves total, double overhead camshaft (DOHC)
Aspiration
Natural and turbocharged
Fuel system
Multi-point electronic indirect fuel injection with three intake manifold-sited fuel injectors with natural aspiration, and direct injection for the TSI
DIN-rated motive power & torque outputs
44 kW (60 PS; 59 bhp) at 5,000–6,000 rpm; 95 N⋅m (70 lb⋅ft) at 3,000–4,300 rpm (CHYA)
55 kW (75 PS; 74 bhp) at 6,200 rpm; 95 N⋅m (70 lb⋅ft) at 3,000–4,300 rpm (CHYB)
62 kW (84 PS; 83 bhp) at 6,350 rpm; 102 N⋅m (75 lb⋅ft) at 3,000 rpm with Ethanol (CSEB)
70 kW (95 PS; 94 bhp) at 5,000–5,500 rpm; 160 N⋅m (118 lb⋅ft) at 1500–3,500 rpm (CHZB)
75 kW (102 PS; 101 bhp) at 5,000–5,500 rpm; Caddy 2K 1.0T (DKRE)
81 kW (110 PS; 109 bhp) at 5,000 - 5,500 rpm; 175 N⋅m (129 lb⋅ft) at 1,750-4,000 rpm (DSHA)
85 kW (116 PS; 114 bhp) at 5,000–5,500 rpm; 200 N⋅m (148 lb⋅ft) at 2000–3,500 rpm (CHZD)
94 kW (128 PS; 126 bhp) at 5,500 rpm; 200 N⋅m (148 lb⋅ft) at 2,000-3,500 rpm with Ethanol (DHSB)

Applications
Volkswagen up!, Škoda Citigo, Škoda Fabia III, Seat Mii, Seat Ibiza, Seat Arona, Volkswagen Golf VII, Volkswagen Polo, Volkswagen T-Roc, Volkswagen T-Cross, Volkswagen Vento (A05), Škoda Rapid, Volkswagen Taigo, Audi A1 (GB), Audi Q2, l SEAT León (4th Gen), Volkswagen Taigun, Volkswagen Virtus, Skoda Slavia, Skoda Kushaq.

== 1.2 TSI - inline-four 16v ==
1.2 TSI 63 kW
63 kW (86 PS; 84 bhp) at 4,800 rpm; 160 N⋅m (118 lb⋅ft) at 1,400–3,200 rpm (CJZB)
63 kW (86 PS; 84 bhp) at 4,300-5,300 rpm; 160 N⋅m (118 lb⋅ft) at 1,400–3,500 rpm (CYVA)
1.2 TSI 66 kW
66 kW (90 PS; 89 bhp) at 4,400–5,400 rpm; 160 N⋅m (118 lb⋅ft) at 1,400–3,500 rpm (CJZC, CYVA)
1.2 TSI 77 kW
77 kW (105 PS; 103 bhp) at 4,500–5,000 rpm; 175 N⋅m (129 lb⋅ft) at 1,400–3,500 rpm (CJZA)
1.2 TSI 81 kW
81 kW (110 PS; 109 bhp) at 4,600–5,600 rpm; 175 N⋅m (129 lb⋅ft) at 1,400–4,000 rpm (CYVB, CJZD)

== 1.4 TSI inline-four 16v ==
DIN-rated motive power & torque outputs, ID codes
81 kW (110 PS; 109 bhp) at 4,800-6,000 rpm; 200 N⋅m (148 lbf⋅ft) at 1,500-3,500 rpm — CPWA
90 kW (122 PS; 121 bhp) at 5,000-6,000 rpm; 200 N⋅m (148 lbf⋅ft) at 1,400-4,000 rpm —CMBA, CPVB, CXSA
92 kW (125 PS; 123 bhp) at 5,000-6,000 rpm; 200 N⋅m (148 lbf⋅ft) at 1,400-4,000 rpm — CZCA, CPVA
103 kW (140 PS; 138 bhp) at 4,500-6,000 rpm; 250 N⋅m (184 lbf⋅ft) at 1,500-3,500 rpm — CHPA, CPTA
110 kW (150 PS; 148 bhp) at 5,000-6,000 rpm; 250 N⋅m (184 lbf⋅ft) at 1,500-3,500 rpm — CZDA, CZEA, CZTA
110 kW (150 PS; 148 bhp) at 5,000-6,000 rpm; 250 N⋅m (184 lbf⋅ft) at 1,400-3,800 rpm — DJKA
110 kW (150 PS; 148 bhp) at 5,000 rpm; 250 N⋅m (184 lbf⋅ft) at 1,400 rpm — CUKB (Data concerning the ICE engine only and not the Hybrid system)

== 1.5 TSI inline-four 16v Evo ==
DIN-rated motive power & torque outputs, ID codes
96 kW (131 PS; 129 bhp) at 5,000 rpm; 200–220 N⋅m (148–162 lbf⋅ft) at 1,400–3,500 rpm — DACA-non GPF, DACB-non-GPF, DPBA-GPF, DPBE-GPF -kangaroo (low torque when cold) because of catalyst pre-heating with lean mixture and extreme retard spark.
110 kW (150 PS; 148 bhp) at 5,000 rpm; 250 N⋅m (184 lbf⋅ft) at 1,500–3,500 rpm — DADA-non GPF, GPF after 2018, DPCA-GPF, both engines have ACT, -kangaroo (low torque when cold) because of catalyst pre-heating with lean mixture and extreme retard spark.
- DXDB-evo2; no kangaroo because is using 2nd air injection for catalyst pre-heating and normal air-fuel mixture.
110 kW (150 PS; 148 bhp) at 5,000 rpm; 250 N⋅m (184 lbf⋅ft) at 1,500–4000 rpm
- DNKA-evo2; no kangaroo because is using 2nd air injection for catalyst pre-heating and normal air-fuel mixture.
118 KW (160 PS; 158 bhp) at 5,500 rpm; 250 Nm at 1750–3500 rpm
- DFYA - evo1- with mild hybrid

== 1.6 MPI ==
DIN-rated motive power & torque outputs, ID codes
66 kW (90 PS; 89 bhp) at 5,200 rpm; 155 N⋅m (114 lbf⋅ft) at 3,800-4,000 rpm — CWVB
81 kW (110 PS; 109 bhp) at 5,800 rpm; 155 N⋅m (114 lbf⋅ft) at 3,800-4,000 rpm — CWVA

(For CIS countries and exports to South Africa and Latin America only)

As of September 2024, the only model equipped exclusively with this engine is the Volkswagen Saveiro made in Brazil, while export versions of the Volkswagen Virtus made in India catering to South Africa and Mexico are available with this as the base engine.

== See also ==
- List of Volkswagen Group engines
