= Audi A1 =

Subcompact luxury car by Audi

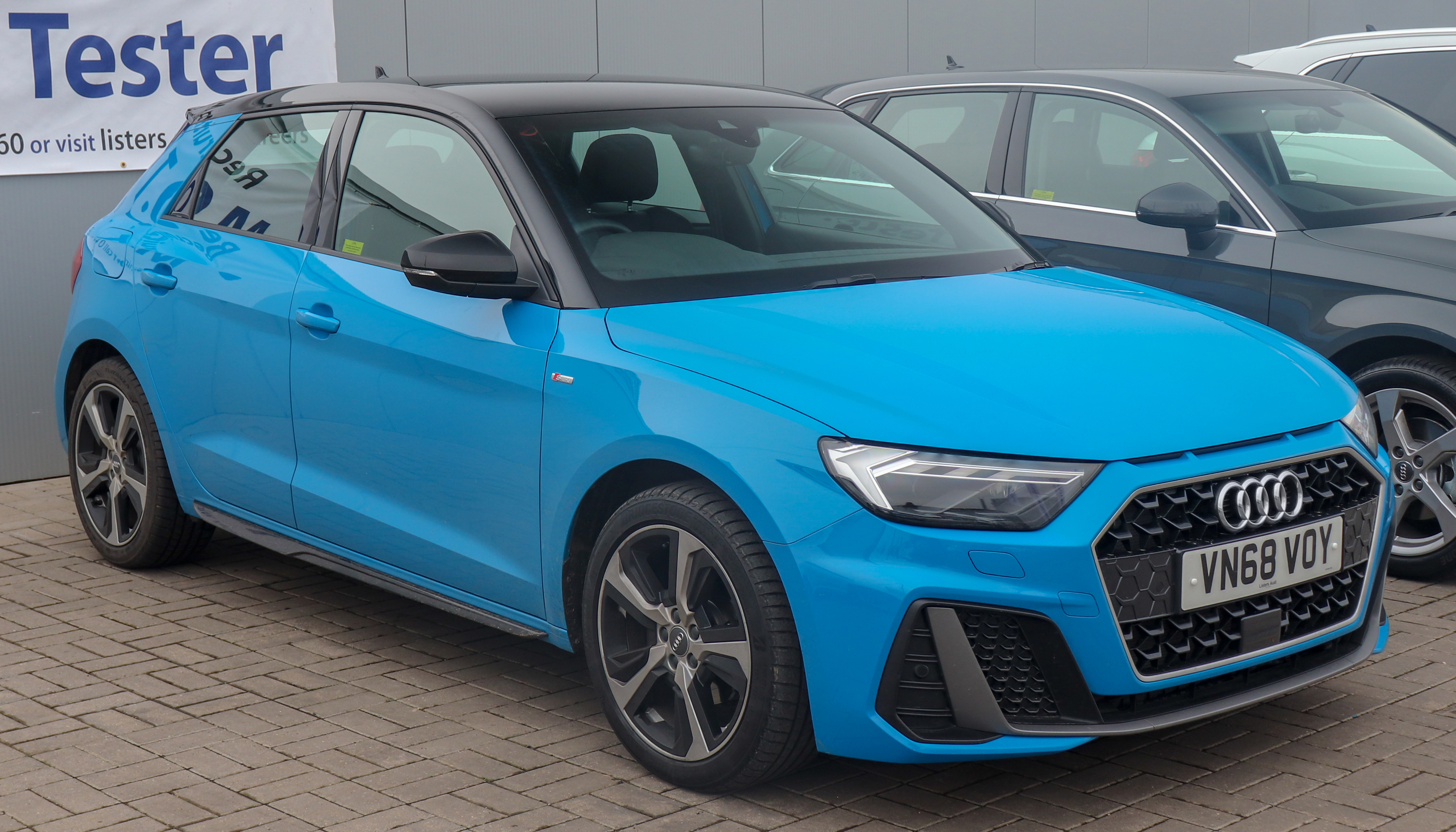
- 2018 Audi A1 S Line 1.0 finished in Turbo Blue

Overview
- Manufacturer: Audi AG
- Production: May 2010 – April 2026; 1,389,658 units

Body and chassis
- Class: Luxury supermini

Chronology
- Predecessor: Audi 50

The Audi A1 is a luxury supermini car launched by Audi at the 2010 Geneva Motor Show. Sales of the initial three-door A1 model started in Germany in August 2010, with the United Kingdom following in November 2010. The five-door model marketed as the Sportback was launched in November 2011, with sales starting in export markets during early 2012. The second generation was released in 2019; the three-door hatchback model was discontinued in 2018 along with the first generation.

== Pre-production concepts ==
=== metroproject (2007) ===
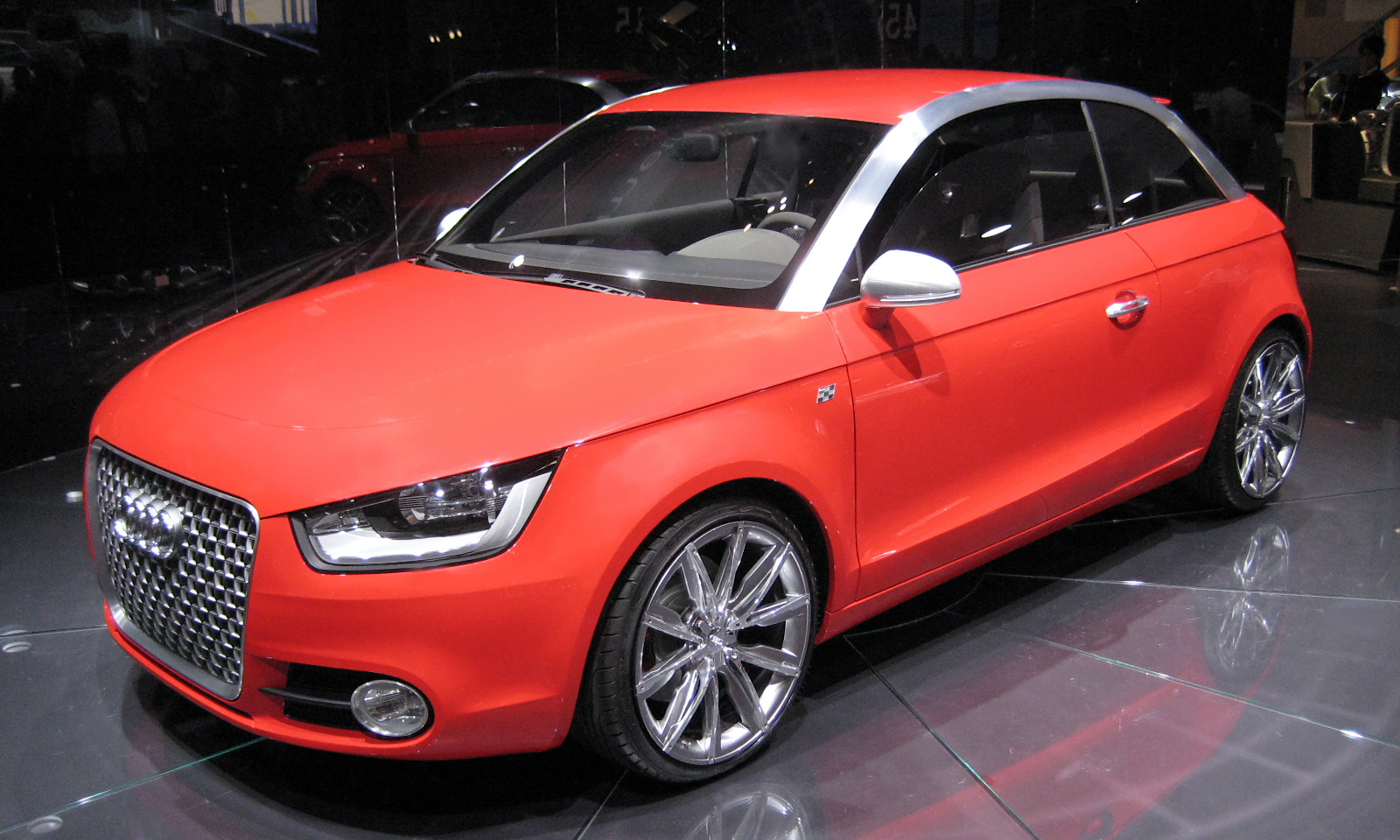
Audi metroproject quattro (front)

The A1 was previewed at the 2007 Tokyo Motor Show as the Audi metroproject concept car. The concept seats four and features a new plug-in hybrid powertrain. With this powertrain, a 1.4 L (85.4 cu in) 148 bhp (110.4 kW) Turbo FSI engine drives the front wheels via a six-speed S tronic gearbox, while a 40 bhp (29.8 kW; 40.6 PS) electric motor provides power to the rear wheels. The electric motor is also capable of producing 148 lb⋅ft (201 N⋅m) of torque.

The metroproject Quattro is able to travel 62 miles (100 km) at up to 62 mph (100 km/h) on one charge of its lithium-ion batteries, which reduces fuel consumption by up to 15%. Both power sources are available to use simultaneously. The concept also features MacPherson strut front and rear four-link suspension configuration, electromechanical speed-sensitive power steering with a low energy draw, Audi magnetic ride adaptive damping technology, and a 0 to 100 km/h (0 to 62 mph) acceleration time of 7.8 seconds.

=== Audi A1 project quattro (2008) ===
At the 2008 Leipzig Auto Mobil International show, Audi again presented the metroproject quattro, renamed the A1 Project Quattro. The vehicle was designed by Audi AG Project Designer in Exterior Design Jürgen Löffler, who also presented the design during the car's Hong Kong debut.

=== A1 Sportback concept (2008) ===
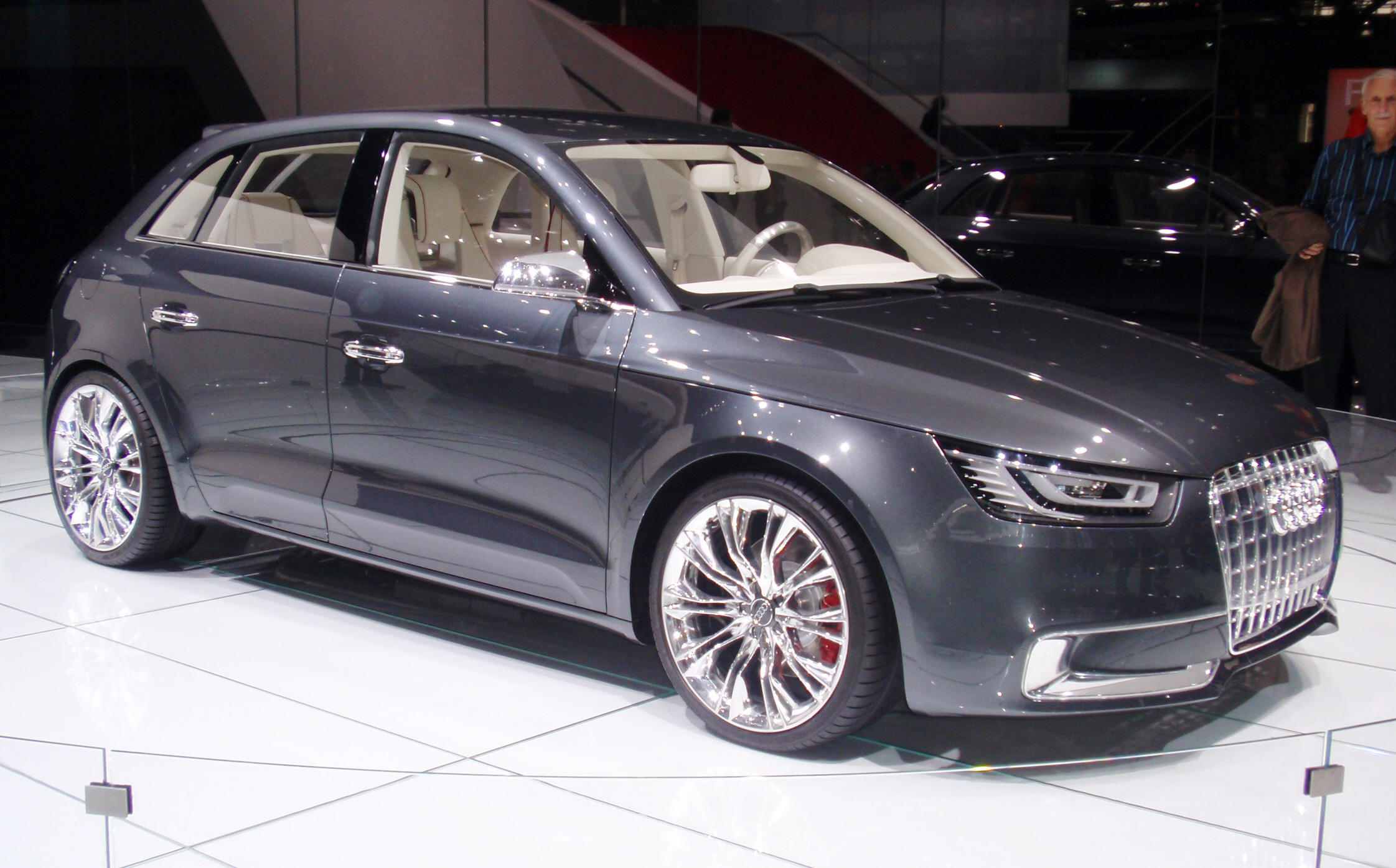
Audi A1 Sportback Concept at the 2008 Paris Motor Show

The A1 Sportback concept is a five-door hatchback based on the Audi A1 project quattro, with longer body of 3.99 m (157.09 in), 1.4-litre TFSI engine rated at 150 PS (110 kW; 148 hp) at 5,500 rpm and 240 N⋅m (177 lb⋅ft) at 1,600-2,400 rpm, S tronic dual-clutch transmission, electric motor rated at 27 PS (20 kW; 27 hp) and 150 N⋅m (110.63 lb⋅ft) driving the front wheels, ESP-controlled active front differential lock, lithium-ion batteries, a two-part spoiler with a striking centre groove integrated into the rear window, Daytona Grey body colour, aerodynamically designed single-frame grille, LED three-dimensional main headlights, turbine-look air vents and air conditioning controls, drive select with dynamic and sport modes, contrasting white and red interior colour scheme, mobile phone WLAN connection, Audi drive select with efficiency mode, MacPherson front suspension and four-link independent rear suspension, 18-inch wheels with 225/35R18 tires, 312 mm (12.28 in) diameter brake discs, electromechanical steering with speed-sensitive power assistance, magnetorheological shock absorbers from Audi R8 and Audi TT. The concept's 0 to 100 km/h (0 to 62 mph) acceleration is 7.9 seconds, and average CO_{2} emissions are given as 92 g/km. The vehicle's electric-only range is 50 km (31.07 mi).

The vehicle was unveiled at the 2008 Paris Motor Show.

== First generation (8X; 2010) ==
First generation
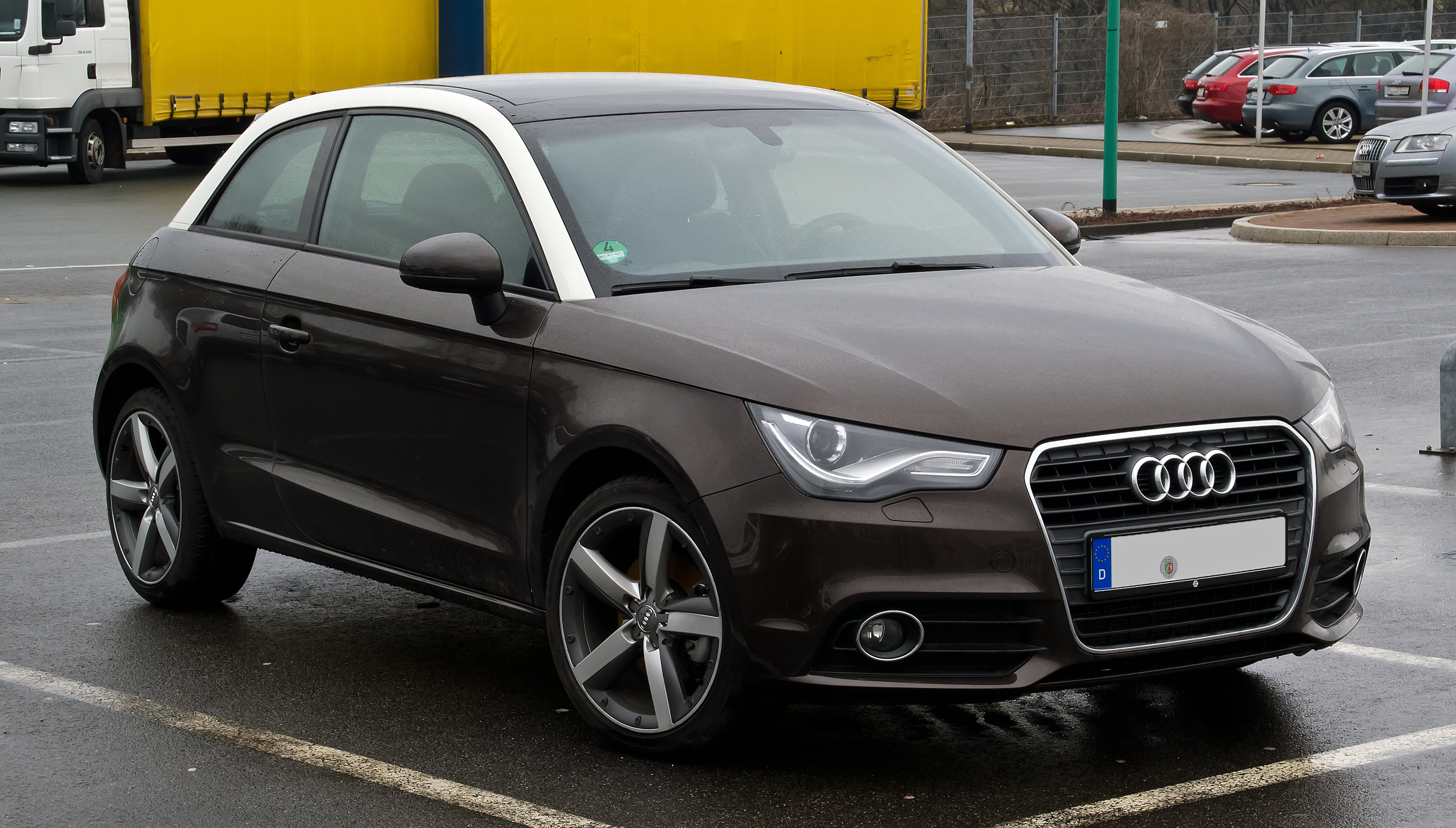

Overview
- Model code: 8X
- Production: May 2010 – August 2018
- Assembly: Belgium: Brussels (Audi Brussels)
- Designer: Jürgen Löffler

Body and chassis
- Body style: 3/5-door hatchback
- Layout: Front-engine, front-wheel-drive Front-engine, four-wheel-drive (quattro, for 6-speed manual models only)
- Platform: Volkswagen Group PQ25
- Related: Volkswagen Polo Mk5; SEAT Ibiza Mk4; Škoda Fabia

Powertrain
- Engine: petrol: 1.0 L TFSI I3; 1.2 L TFSI I4; 1.4 L TFSI I4; 2.0 L TFSI I4; diesel: 1.6 L TDI I4; 2.0 L TDI I4
- Transmission: 5-speed manual 6-speed manual 7-speed S tronic 1-speed (A1 e-tron)

Dimensions
- Wheelbase: 2,469 mm (97.2 in)
- Length: 3,954 mm (155.7 in)
- Width: 1,740 mm (68.5 in)
- Height: 1,416 mm (55.7 in)
- Kerb weight: 1,040–1,140 kg (2,290–2,510 lb)

The A1 three-door went on sale in most markets in late 2010, following the launch at Wörthersee Tour 2010, followed by the major public launch at the 2010 Paris Motor Show. The car is aimed mostly at young, affluent urban buyers.

=== A1 Sportback (2012–2018) ===
The five-door version of the Audi A1, called "Sportback" by Audi, was unveiled at the 2011 Tokyo Motor Show.

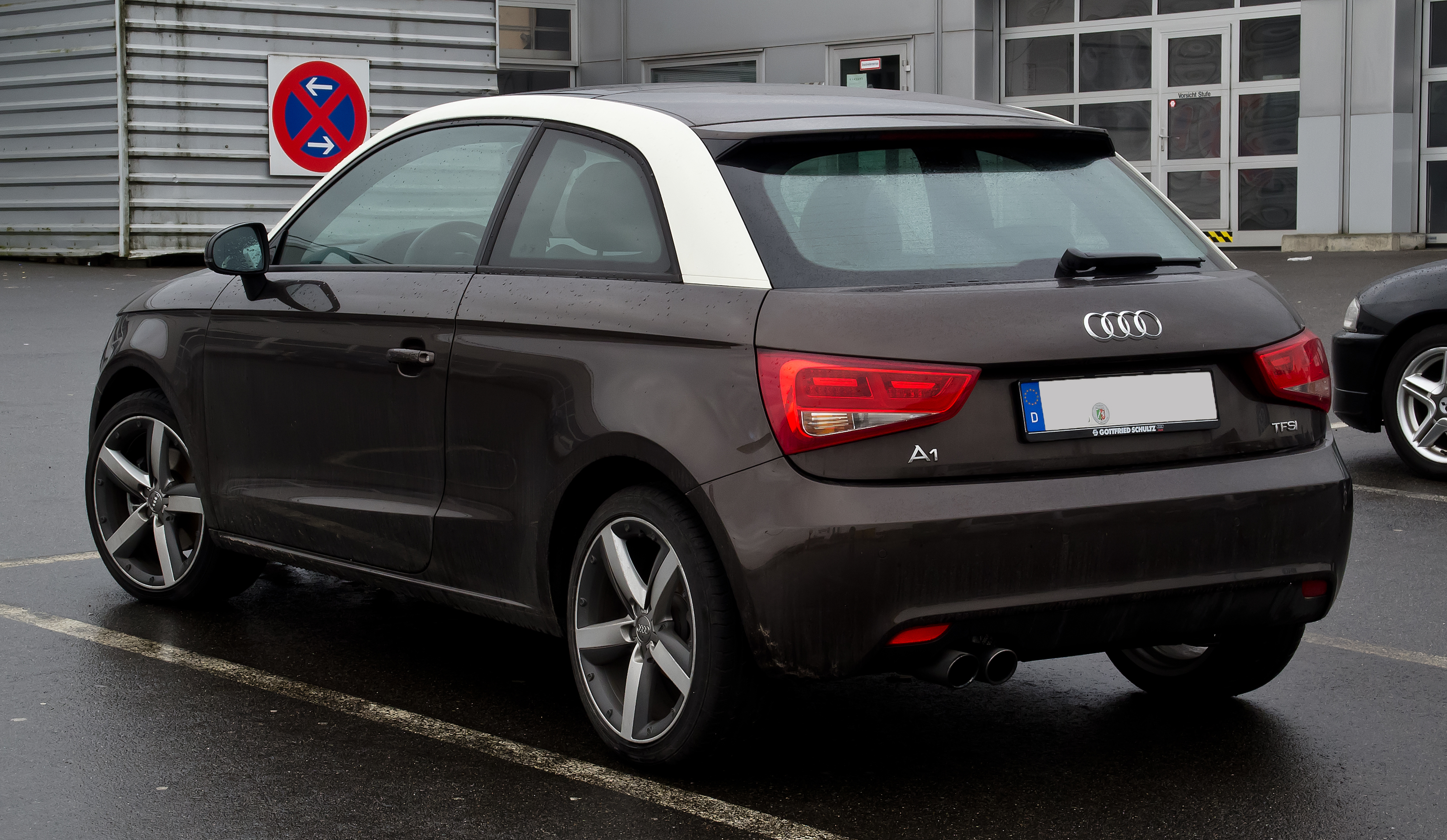
3-door

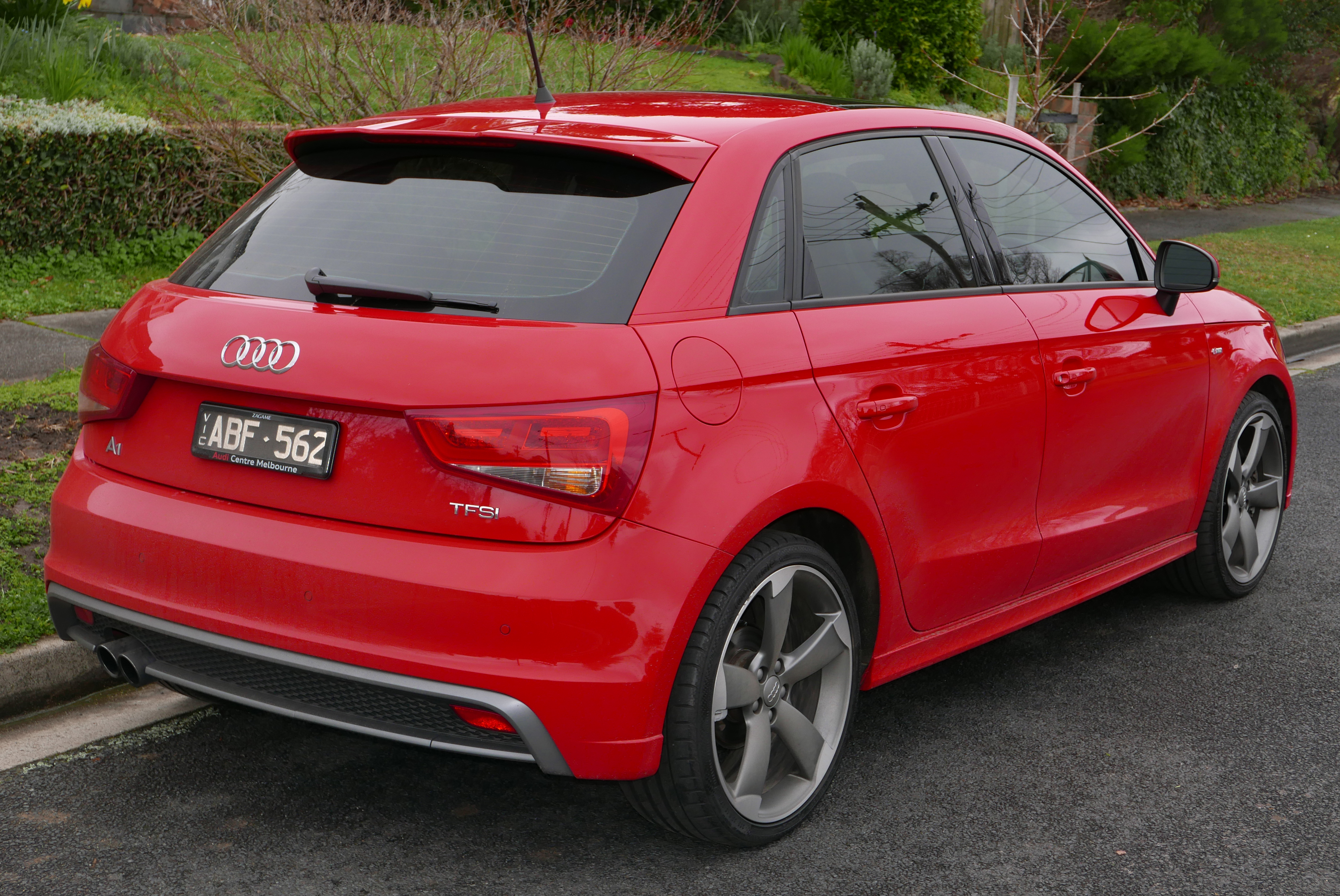
5-door Sportback

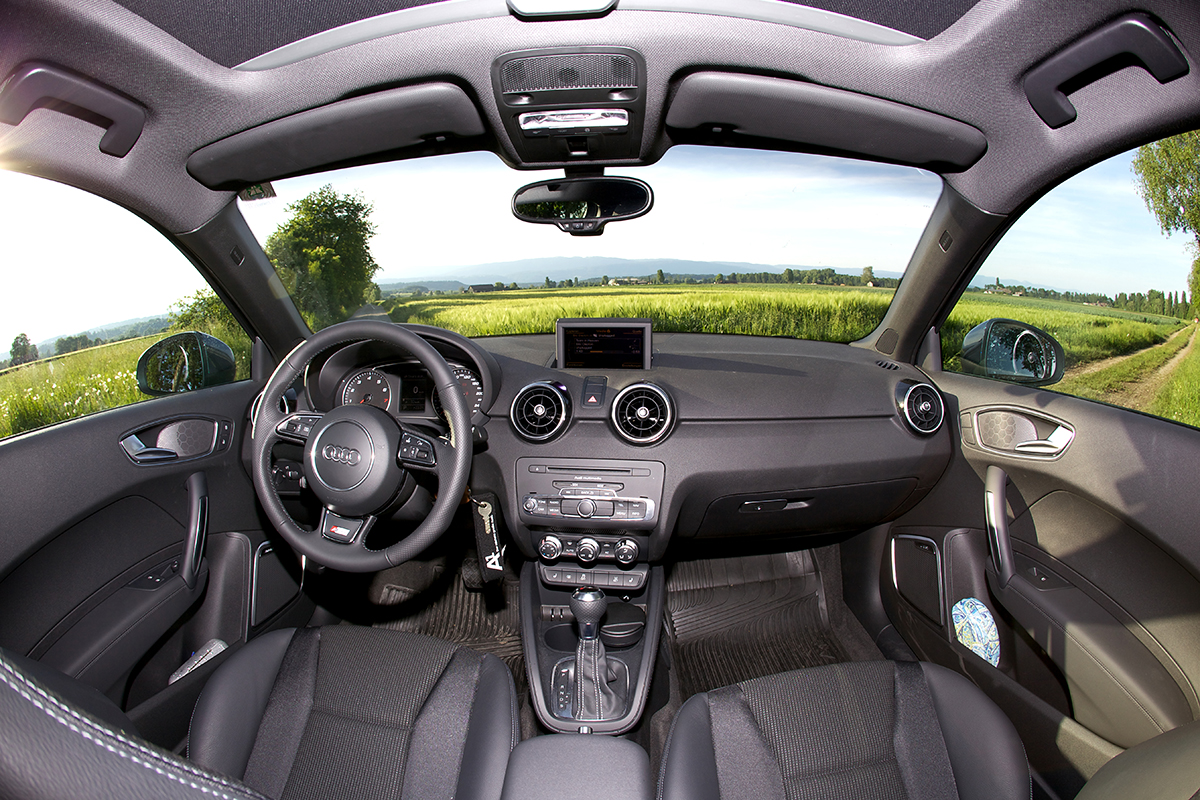
Interior

=== Chassis and equipment ===
The A1 uses a MacPherson strut front and torsion beam rear suspension.

In the UK, the A1 trim levels are SE, Sport, and S line. SE is the base specification, while Sport and S line models also have sport seats, sports suspension and larger wheels, amongst other features.

=== Safety ===
ANCAP test results Audi A1 all petrol variants (2011)
| Test | Score |
|---|---|
| Overall | 5 /5 stars |
| Frontal offset | 14.90/16 |
| Side impact | 13.85/16 |
| Pole | 2/2 |
| Seat belt reminders | 2/3 |
| Whiplash protection | Good |
| Pedestrian protection | Marginal |
| Electronic stability control | Standard |

Euro NCAP tested the Audi A1 supermini 3-door hatchback with front airbags, side airbags, seatbelt pretensioners and load limiters as standard and scored it accordingly:

Euro NCAP test results Audi A1 LHD, 3-door Hatchback (2010)
| Test | Points | % |
|---|---|---|
| Overall: | 5 /5 stars | |
| Adult occupant: | 32 | 90% |
| Child occupant: | 39 | 79% |
| Pedestrian: | 18 | 49% |
| Safety assist: | 6 | 86% |

=== Engines ===
Petrol engines
| Model | Displacement | Series | Power | Torque | Transmission | Years |
|---|---|---|---|---|---|---|
| 1.0 TFSI | 999 cc I3 | CHZB | 95 PS (70 kW; 94 hp) | 160 N⋅m (118 lb⋅ft) | 5-speed manual or 7-speed S tronic | 2015–2018 |
| 1.2 TFSI | 1,197 cc I4 | CBZA | 86 PS (63 kW; 85 hp) | 160 N⋅m (118 lb⋅ft) | 5-speed manual | 2010–2018 |
| 1.4 TFSI 122 | 1,390 cc I4 | CAXA | 122 PS (90 kW; 120 hp) | 200 N⋅m (148 lb⋅ft) | 6-speed manual or 7-speed S tronic | 2010–2018 |
| 1.4 TFSI 140 | 1,395 cc I4 | CPTA | 140 PS (103 kW; 138 hp) | 250 N⋅m (184 lb⋅ft) | 7-speed S tronic | 2013–2018 |
| 1.4 TFSI 185 | 1,390 cc I4 | CAVG/CTHG | 185 PS (136 kW; 182 hp) | 250 N⋅m (184 lb⋅ft) | 7-speed S tronic | 2011–2018 |
| 1.8 TFSI | 1798 cc I4 | DAJB | 192 PS (141 kW; 189 hp) | 250 N⋅m (184 lb⋅ft) | 7-speed S tronic | 2014–2018 |
| 2.0 TFSI S1 | 1,984 cc I4 | CWZA | 231 PS (170 kW; 228 hp) | 370 N⋅m (273 lb⋅ft) | 6-speed manual | 2014–2018 |
| 2.0 TFSI 256 Quattro | 1,984 cc I4 | CDLH | 256 PS (188 kW; 252 hp) | 350 N⋅m (258 lb⋅ft) | 6-speed manual | 2012 |
Diesel engines
| 1.4 TDI | 1,422 cc I3 | CUSB | 90 PS (66 kW; 89 hp) | 230 N⋅m (170 lb⋅ft) | 5-speed manual or 7-speed S tronic | 2014–2018 |
| 1.6 TDI 90 | 1,598 cc I4 | CAYB | 90 PS (66 kW; 89 hp) | 230 N⋅m (170 lb⋅ft) | 5-speed manual or 7-speed S tronic | 2011–2018 |
| 1.6 TDI 105 | 1,598 cc I4 | CAY/CAYC/CXMA | 105 PS (77 kW; 104 hp) | 250 N⋅m (184 lb⋅ft) | 5-speed manual | 2010–2018 |
| 1.6 TDI 116 | 1,598 cc I4 | CAY/CAYC/CXMA | 116 PS (85 kW; 114 hp) | 250 N⋅m (184 lb⋅ft) | 5-speed manual or 7-speed S tronic | 2015–2018 |
| 2.0 TDI | 1,968 cc I4 | CFHD | 143 PS (105 kW; 141 hp) | 320 N⋅m (236 lb⋅ft) | 6-speed manual | 2011–2018 |

All engines will include a start-stop system and energy recuperation system except the versions with the 185 PS (136 kW; 182 hp) 1.4 TFSI and the S tronic version of the 1.6-litre TDI with 90 HP. 1.4-litre TFSI (122 PS (90 kW; 120 hp)) was sold as the 30 TFSI in China.

The production version of the A1 quattro was tested by Autocar magazine on MIRA's wet handling track alongside a Nissan GT-R; the A1 recorded lap time over five seconds faster than the GT-R. Autocar called the test a "giant-killing result".

=== Production ===
The A1 was produced at Audi's Belgian factory in Forest, near Brussels. The A1 is based on the Volkswagen Group PQ25 platform, the same platform used in the SEAT Ibiza Mk4 and the VW Polo Mk5, and in its development Audi has collaborated with SEAT. As of 23 June 2011, the 100,000th A1 was produced at Audi Brussels plant.

A version of 2011 Audi A1 painted by Damien Hirst was sold for £350,000.

=== Limited editions ===
==== A1 Motto Vehicles (2010) ====
A1 "Competition Kit" (Amalfi White) with 1.6 TDI engine, A1 "Follow Me" (Citrus Yellow) with 1.4 TFSI engine, A1 "Wasserwacht" (Suzuka Gray) with 1.4 TFSI engine, A1 "FC Bayern" (Misano Red) with 1.6 TDI engine, A1 "Pickerljäger" (Ibis White) with 1.6 TDI engine, A1 "Fashion" (Aubergine) with 1.6 TDI engine, A1 "Hot Rod" (Daytona Gray) with 1.4 TFSI were unveiled in Wörthersee Tour 2010.

==== A1 e-tron concept (2010) ====
The A1 e-tron is a series plug-in hybrid (PHEV), with UQM PowerPhase Select 125 electric motor and controller rated 45 kW (61 PS; 60 bhp) continuous output and peak output of 75 kW (102 PS; 101 bhp). A fully charged 12 kWh lithium-ion battery gives a maximum range of 50 km (31 mi), after which a 254 cc Wankel engine is used to power a 15 kW (20 PS; 20 bhp) generator with a 12 L (2.6 imp gal; 3.2 US gal) fuel tank. This is estimated to provide an additional range of 124 mi (200 km). The company claims the car weighs 1,190 kg (2,624 lb), can reach 62 mph (100 km/h) in 10.2 seconds and a maximum speed of 80 mph (129 km/h).

The vehicle was unveiled at the 2010 Geneva Motor Show, followed by the 2012 Taipei Motor Show.

==== A1 e-tron ====
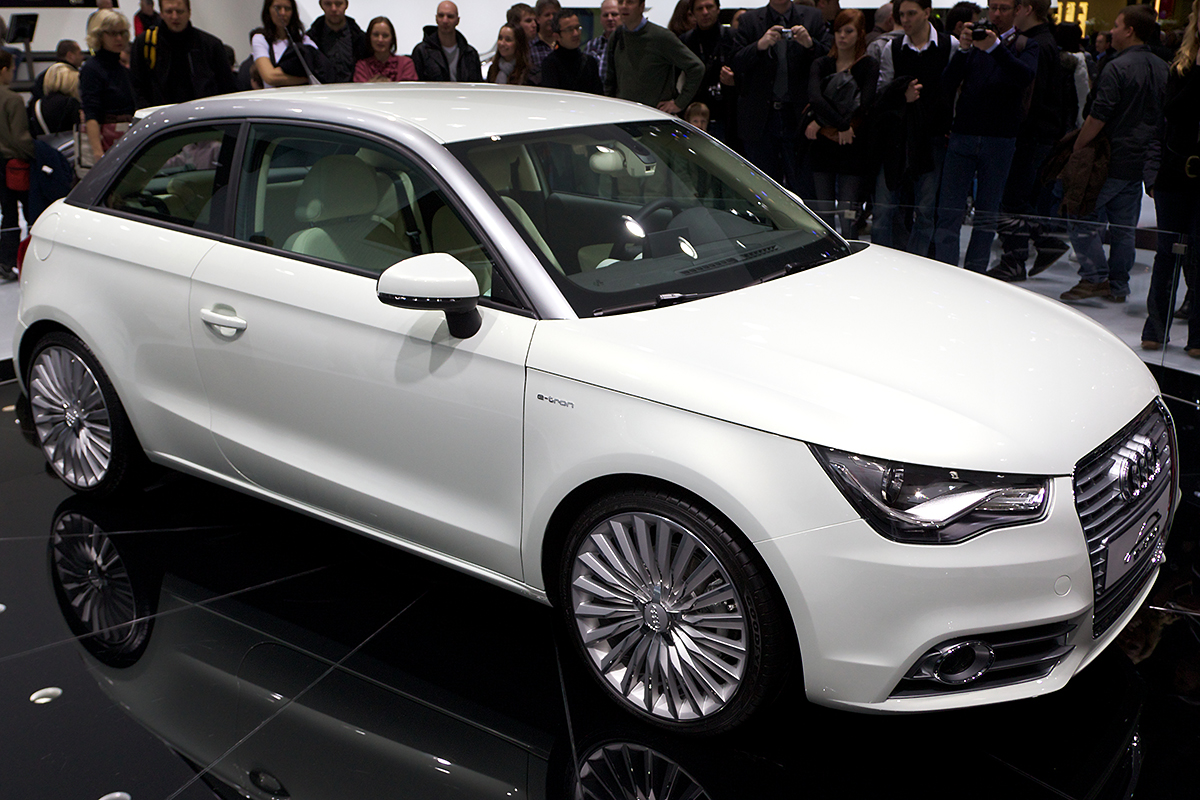
Audi A1 e-tron

A field testing programme of twenty A1 e-tron vehicles began in Munich in late 2010.

In June 2012, the UK's Car Magazine reported that Audi had put the production version of the A1 e-tron on hold indefinitely in order to slim down its future electric vehicles plan. It was reported that, according to the director of e-mobility and sustainability strategy at Audi of America, the A1 e-tron had never been scheduled for production.

In March 2013, at the New York Auto Show, Audi announced it will be expanding the testing of its A1 E-tron outside of Munich to other regions of Germany.

Production of the A1 e-tron was reported to be cancelled.

==== A1 Competition Line, Contrast Edition (2011–) ====
Available in A1 1.4 TFSI (122PS) and 1.6 TDI (105PS), the A1 Competition Line is based on Sport trim (Sports seats, a leather multifunction steering wheel, Driver's Information System) for the UK market, inspired by the famous models from Audi's motorsport heritage, such as the Audi Quattro rally car. It included 18-inch 'Polygon' design alloy wheels, exterior styling package (front spoiler, double-blade roof spoiler, side skirts, rear diffuser in gloss black, stainless steel tailpipe trims), roof line, shoulder line with 'Audi Sport' lettering, number '1' on the bonnet and doors, boot lid, front spoiler lip, side skirts, wheel arch; surrounds and double-blade roof spoiler, rear sills with Audi rings, centre console trim, door handles, floor mats, rear-view mirror trim (not available with auto-dimming mirror), air vent sleeves in high gloss white.

The Contrast Edition is based on Sport trim (Sports seats, a leather multifunction steering wheel, Driver's Information System) for the UK market, with 17-inch '5-arm' design alloy wheels, exterior styling package (front spoiler lip, double-blade roof spoiler, side skirts, rear diffuser in gloss black, stainless steel tailpipe trims), roof contrast line, matching contrast on front spoiler lip, side skirts and double-blade roof spoiler.

The A1 Contrast Edition went on sale in mid-2011.

==== A1 clubsport quattro (2011) ====
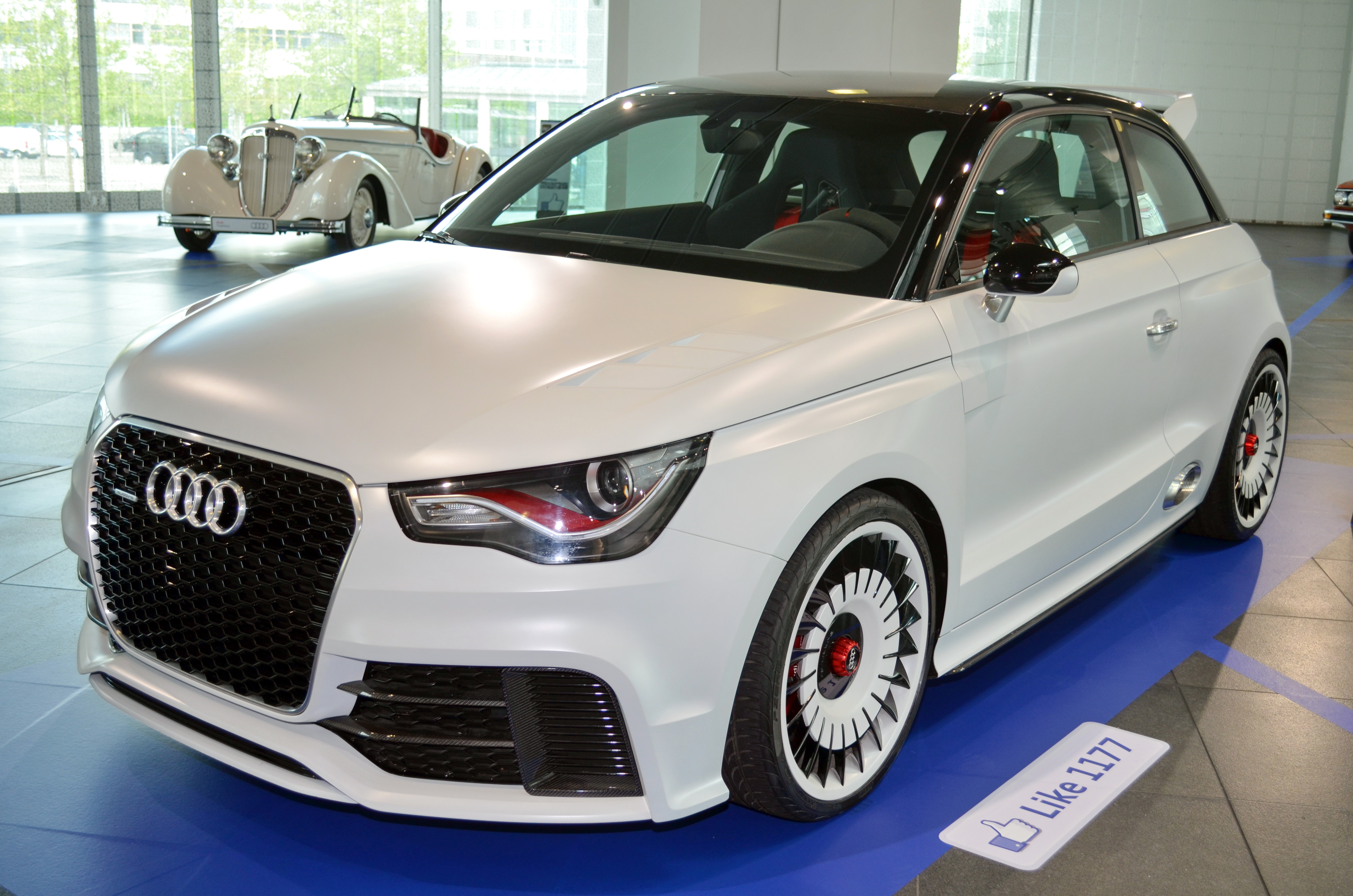
A1 Clubsport Quattro

The A1 clubsport quattro is a one-off concept version of the Audi A1 powered by a modified version of the Audi RS 3's 2.5 TFSI engine rated at 503 PS (370 kW) at 2500–5300 rpm and 660 N⋅m (487 lb⋅ft). It features a six-speed manual transmission and quattro on-demand all-wheel drive from the Audi TT RS, as well as ventilated carbon fiber-ceramic front brake discs with six-piston calipers, carbon fiber-reinforced polymer roof and CFRP bucket seats from the Audi R8 GT. It is capable of accelerating from 0 to 100 km/h (0 to 62 mph) in 3.7 seconds.

Other features include 19-inch turbine alloy wheels with 255/30 low-profile tires, Glacier White matte body colour, side-exit tailpipe located on the left flank in front of the rear wheel, high-gloss black painted roof, solid aluminium four-ring front logo, black honeycomb grille, headlights with matted clasps with a red 'wing', air outlet vents in the hood, front fenders and doors and the rear side panels widened by 60 mm (2.36 in) in horizontal "blister" edges (from Audi Ur-quattro), exposed CFRP trim strips on the sills, Audi R8 side mirrors, roof spoiler with a double wing, darkly toned rear lights, and single closed rear diffuser.

To save weight, the Audi MMI monitor infotainment system and speakers were removed the rear seat was replaced by a crossbar, weight-optimized starter battery placed in the rear, rocker switches on the centre console replace switches on the control stalk and in the door panels, and interior door and storage compartment handles were replaced with fabric loops. The interior also has red four-point seat belts, matte-finished CFRP trim throughout the interior; CFRP open-spoked sport steering wheel upholstered in leather, oil pressure, boost pressure and voltage gauges; fine leather upholstery with tone-on-tone stitching, aluminium gear selector lever, and stainless steel pedal caps and footrest.

The concept was unveiled at the 2011 Wörthersee Tour.

Parts shown on the Audi A1 clubsport quattro were sold as part of the accessories program for the A1 family, with adhesive film decals in the contrasting colours Amalfi White, Ice Silver, metallic and Daytona Gray, pearl effect for the vehicles' shoulders available immediately. Other options included union square lifestyle kit (exterior decals and design elements for the interior, both with a diamond pattern), roof spoiler competition kit. The union square lifestyle kit are painted either in the body colour or in a contrasting colour.

==== 2012 Audi A1 Contrast Edition, Black Edition (2011–) ====
The A1 Contrast Edition is available for all engines in the A1 Sport range except 1.4 TFSI 185PS for the UK market, with contrasting colour for the roof line and aerodynamic body styling elements (optional double-blade roof spoiler in a contrasting colour), 17-inch 'five-arm' design bi-colour alloy wheels.

The UK version of the A1 Black Edition is a version of the A1 1.4 TFSI (185PS) S line and 2.0 TDI (143PS) S line with black styling treatment for the single frame grille surround and number plate holder, dark tinted rear privacy glass, 18-inch five-arm rotor design alloy wheels in a titanium finish, Xenon Plus headlights with LED daytime-running lights, full electronic climate control, and a 180-watt Audi Sound System speaker upgrade.

The Taiwan version of the A1 Black Edition is a limited (40 units) version of the A1 Ambition with high gloss front fascia with black fog lamp shade, 17-inch 5-spoke aluminium wheels, turbine design air conditioning vent sleeves in aluminium.

==== A1 Samurai Blue (2011–12) ====
The A1 Samurai Blue is a Japanese special edition model based on the 1.4 TFSI (122PS) 3-door unveiled at the 2011 Tokyo Motor Show. It is inspired by the Japanese national soccer team, with red 18-inch wheels with exclusive polygonal design, black interior equipment with contrasting stitching in blue, corresponding colour accents for air vent nozzles, inlays, centre console and floor mats; sports suspension. Part of the profit will be donated to the Japan Football Association revival fund. A further 111 models were released in 2012.

A1 Union Square (2012)

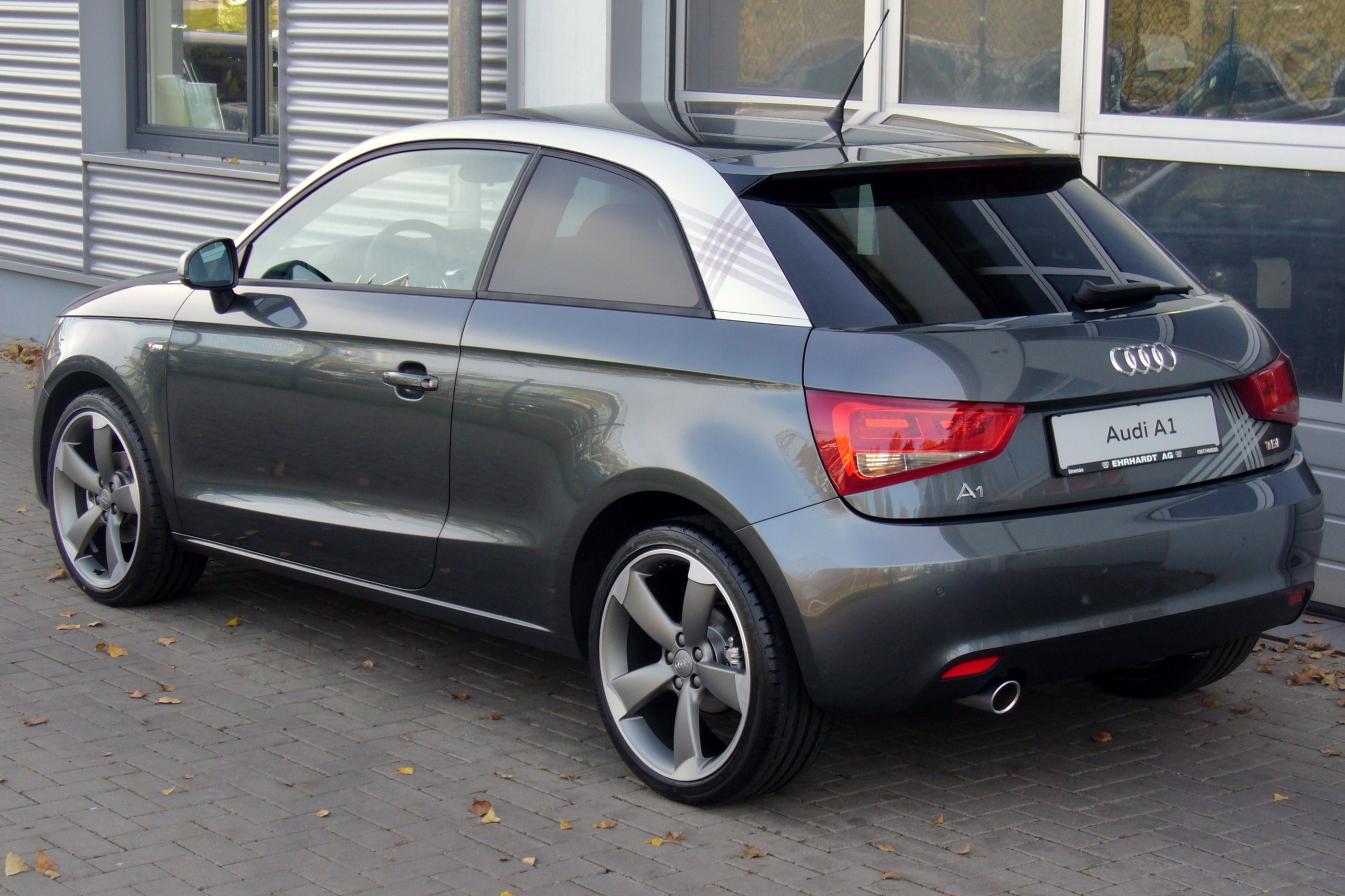
A1 union square

The model is known for its prints, striking on the sides, trunk and lateral mirrors (wine colour) in addition to its elegant finishes in air conditioning exits, door handles, centre console and mats, matching the same prints that surround the car (in wine colour).

The Audi A1 2012 model features a larger engine, the 1.4 litre turbocharged FSI, which generates 122 hp (91 kW) and 200 N⋅m (148 lb⋅ft) of torque. This engine is paired with either a 6-speed manual or an 7-speed S-tronic with paddle shifters and is front-wheel drive.

==== A1 quattro (2012-13) ====
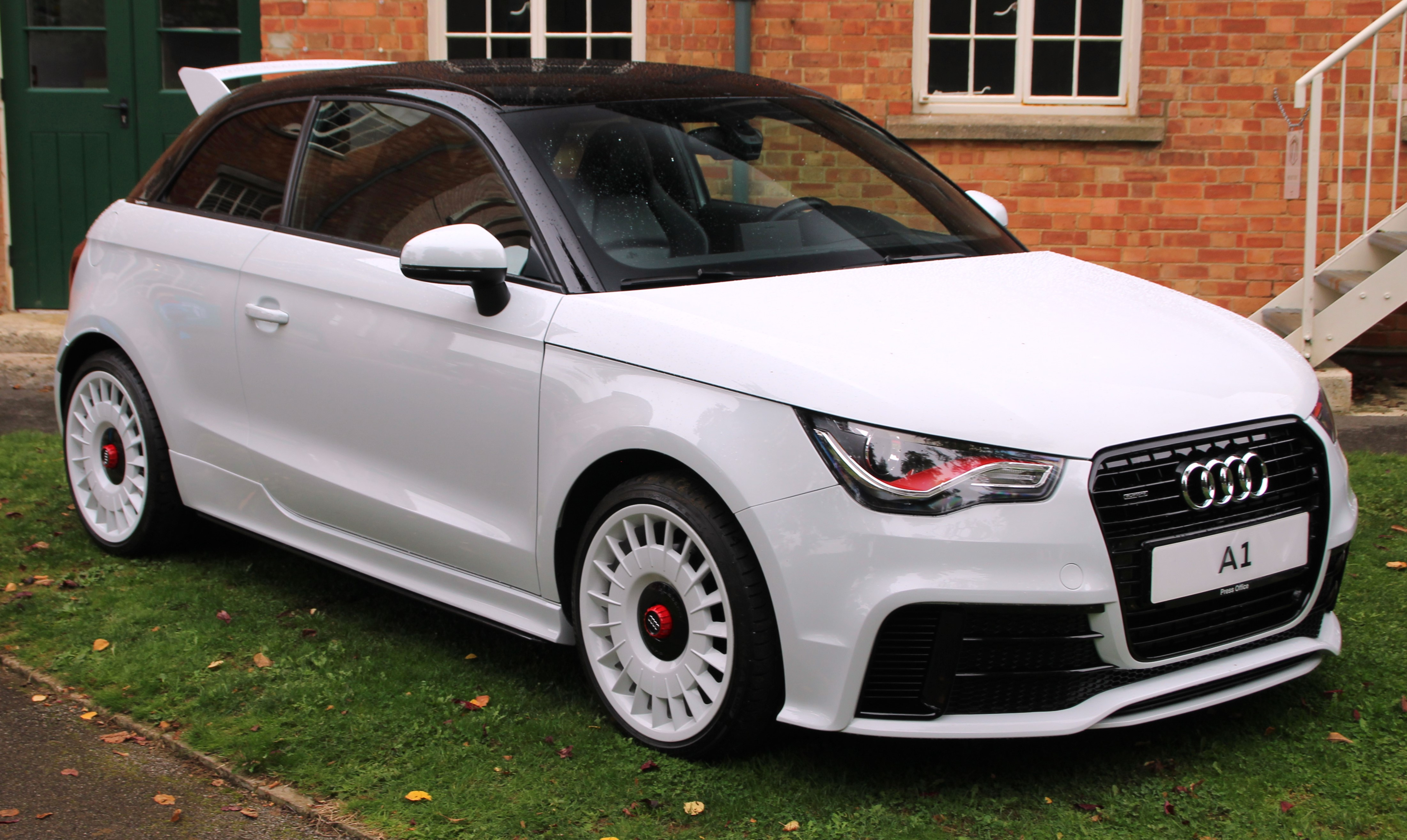
A1 quattro

It is a limited (333 units) version of the Audi A1 with 2.0 TFSI engine rated at 256 PS (188 kW; 252 hp) at 6,000 rpm and 350 N⋅m (258.15 lb⋅ft) at 2,500-4,500 rpm, six-speed transmission, electronic differential lock, 8.0Jx18 Glacier White painted cast alloy turbine wheels with 225/35-series tires, 312 mm (12.28 in) diameter front brake discs with black calipers, ESP stabilization program with a sport mode, Glacier White metallic body colour, high-gloss black roof, high-gloss black grille, red accents in the headlights, 'quattro' badging on the grille, roof arch and the rear hatch; tinted rear windows, black rear hatch and diffuser, tinted LED rear lights, and twin polished exhaust tips.

The interior is exclusively black with Silk Nappa leather upholstery with contrasting red seams, front S sport seats with bolsters integrated head restraints and a quattro badging, brushed stainless steel footrest and pedal caps, floor mats with red contrast stitching, door sill trims with A1 quattro badges, instrument cluster with white needles, red tachometer, quattro logo, and colour information display; leather-wrapped flat bottom multifunction sport steering wheel with contrasting red stitching and the car's serial number, aluminium shift lever knob, and aluminium-look control elements.

The vehicle went on sale in the second half of 2012.

==== A1 amplified, amplified plus, amplified advanced (2012–) ====
These versions of the A1 and A1 Sportback based on the Ambition line, which is available for all engine versions of both models. The models combine exclusive optional features from Audi, quattro GmbH and Audi Genuine Accessories. The amplified red line and amplified white are in Misano Red pearl and Glacier White metallic body colours respectively.

The amplified model includes high-gloss black roof line, S line roof spoiler, exterior mirror housings and single-frame grille; five-spoke 17-inch alloy wheels with black inserts, a matte transparent film for the engine hood, roof and rear hatch; body color air vent sleeves, black sport seats with stitching in Parade Red (amplified red) or Rock Gray (amplified white), and floor mats with piping in matching colours.

The amplified plus model is based on the amplified, with black headliner, an LED interior light package, a colour-coordinated ignition key, body colour centre console and interior mirror housings, stainless steel footrest and pedal caps, body colour aerodynamics competition kit, LED taillights, high-gloss black diffuser insert integrating dual matte black tailpipes on the left side (single tailpipe for engines up to 77 kW).

The amplified advanced model (available for A1 models with over 90 kW of engine power) is based on amplified and amplified plus, with S line sport package interior (S sport seats with black upholstery in Silk Nappa leather and contrasting stitching in Parade Red or Dark Silver, seat back shells in high-gloss Misano Red or Glacier White), matching finish on the floor mats, dark tinted glass at the rear, add-on parts from the aerodynamics competition kit and the large roof wing in high-gloss black, Xenon plus headlights, matt black 18-inch wheels in five-arm 'Rotor' design.

Early models include A1 amplified red edition models, followed by amplified white versions shortly afterwards.

==== A1 e-tron German Olympic team car (2012) ====
It is a version of the A1 e-tron with German Olympic team colour scheme and decor, 20-spoke wheels.

The vehicle was unveiled in the London 2012 Summer Olympics and was used in the 2012 London Olympic games as shuttles between German House and MS Deutschland cruise ship.

==== A1 Competition Line exterior styling packages (2012–) ====
The A1 Competition Line exterior styling packages are based on the limited A1 Competition Line, available for the UK market. Competition Line plus exterior styling package is based on the A1 3-door, with foils with striking colouring on shoulder line with 'Audi Sport' lettering, wheel arch surrounds, roof line, boot lid with Audi chrome rings, Audi rings for side sills and Number '1' on the bonnet and doors.

==== A1 Huffer Edition (2013–) ====
It is a limited (15 units) version of the A1 Sport Plus for the New Zealand market, produced in association with Huffer clothing company. It included 1.4 TFSI (185PS) engine, choice of 3 body colours (black, red with black roof, white with black roof), racing-style bucket seats, interior fabrics in sprint cloth and black leather, suede-covered steering wheel, handbrake and gear selector; brushed aluminium inlays, MMI navigation system.

The vehicle went on sale in January 2013.

==== A1 China Limited Edition (2013–) ====
The A1 China Limited Edition is a limited (500 units) version of the Audi A1 30 TFSI Ego and A1 30 TFSI Ego plus for China market, with 1.4 TFSI (122PS) engine, 7-speed S tronic transmission, electronic anti-theft system, optional MMI Navigation plus with 20G hard disk space and simple voice input system, S line sporty chassis, sparkling red/white/gold three theme colours, 17-inch 5-spoke red/silver wheels, highlighted spraying red decorative trim for air vents, the central control board, inside rear-view mirror, door handles and other details are all decorated with Chinese elements. A1 30 TFSI Ego plus adds leather seats, tire pressure monitor, automatic air conditioner with rain sensor, Audi audio system, Bluetooth/Audi audio system connector, rain sensor for automatic anti-glare rear view mirror, xenon bulb with headlamp cleaner and LED tail lamps over A1 30 TFSI Ego.

==== A1 Sportback Urban Style Limited Edition (2013–) ====
The Audi A1 Sportback Urban Style Limited (model DBA-8XCAX) is a limited (200 units) version of the right hand drive Audi A1 Sportback 1.4 TFSI (122PS) with 7-speed S tronic transmission for Japan market, with bi-xenon package (bi-xenon headlight, automatic headlight range control, headlight washer, rear LED combination lamp), exclusive brilliant black grille, exclusive brilliant black contrast roof, S-line roof spoiler in exclusive brilliant black, brilliant black door mirror cover, exclusive decorative film, air conditioning vent sleeve in exclusive glacier white, exclusive sport seat in Herzklopfen cloth upholstery in black with rock grey stitching, advance door key with body colour cover (glacier white), exclusive floor mat with grey piping and white stitching, exclusive 5-spoke 7.5Jx17-inch aluminium wheels with inner rim in high gloss black, 215/40R17 tires.

The vehicle went on sale in 2013-05-08.

==== A1 Sportback 'S line Competition' Limited Edition (2013–) ====
It is a limited (200 units) version of the Audi A1 Sportback S line for the Australian market, with 1.4 TFSI (122PS) engine, S tronic transmission, 17-inch alloy wheels in part-polished 5-spoke V design, front fog lights, LED tail lights, black exterior styling package, contrasting roof and roof arch, interior air vents in body colour, Audi parking system (rear), choice of 4 body colours (metallic colours Glacier White and Ice Silver, pearl effect colours Misano Red and Phantom Black).

==== A1 Sportback Lifestyle, A1 Competition Legends (2013–) ====
The A1 Sportback Lifestyle (時尚限量版) is a limited (76 units) version of the Audi A1 Sportback 1.4 TFSI with 7-speed S tronic transmission for the Taiwan market, with stainless steel pedal, Lifestyle series floor mat, instrument panel black leather upholstery with white stitching (including steering wheel, hand brake, shifter knob), Lifestyle series centre console veneer, Audi exclusive aluminium alloy air conditioning vent sleeves, high gloss black side mirror cover.

The A1 Competition Legends (傳奇競速限量版) is a limited (4 units) version of the Audi A1 1.4 TFSI 7-speed S tronic transmission for the Taiwan market, with stainless steel pedal, Legends series floor mat, Legends series leather shifter, Legends series hand brake cover, Legends series leather-wrapped steering wheel, Legends series centre console veneer, Legends series inner door veneer, Legends series air conditioning vent veneer, Audi Sport body decor.

==== A1 S line Style Edition, Black Edition (2013–) ====
Available for the A1 and A1 Sportback (1.2 TFSI 86PS, 1.4 TFSI 122PS and 1.6 TDI 105 PS), they are versions of the A1 S line for the UK market, with choice of 4 body colours (Ice Silver, Phantom Black, Misano Red or Glacier White colour) with metallic or pearl-effect paint finishes, gloss black finish (3-door) or fully gloss black (Sportback) contrasting roof line, gloss black door mirror housings, xenon headlamps with distinctive LED daytime running lights, Black styling package (a gloss finish for the single frame front grille surround, a matt black finish for the grille, fog light surrounds and number plate holder), 17-inch 'five V-spoke' or no-cost optional 'five-arm' design alloy wheels with a bi-colour finish, interior air vents sleeves in body colour (gloss black for Ice Silver and Phantom Black body colour car), part-leather sports seats, three-spoke S line sports steering wheel.

The Black Edition (available for 1.4 TFSI cylinder on demand, 1.4 TFSI (185PS), 2.0 TDI (143PS)) is based on the S line trim level, with 18-inch titanium finish alloy wheels, 180-watt Audi sound system, privacy glass and electronic climate control.

==== A1 Urban Racer Limited, A1 Sportback Admired Limited (2013–) ====
The A1 urban racer limited (model ABA-8XCTH) is a limited (150 units) version of the right hand drive A1 1.4 TFSI 3-door for the Japan market, with increased engine power to 185 PS (136 kW; 182 hp) at 6200 rpm and 250 N⋅m (184.39 lb⋅ft) at 2000-4500 rpm via a supercharger, 7-speed S tronic transmission, matt black single frame grille, bi-xenon package, contrast roof, mirror housing in contrast roof colour, S-line roof spoiler, 18-inch aluminium wheel with exclusive 5-spoke design, black interior, S-line sports seat or leather-wrapped 3-spoke multifunction sport steering wheel with paddle shifter, checker black design floor mat, MMI 3G+navigation, choice of 4 body colours (Daytona Grey, Glacier White, Misano Red, Phantom Black).

The A1 Sportback admired limited (model DBA-8XCAX) is a limited (500 units) version of the right hand drive A1 1.4 TFSI (122PS) Sportback for the Japan market, 7-speed S tronic transmission, with matt black single frame grille, S-line front bumper and roof spoiler, bi-xenon package, contrast roof, black door mirror housing, 17-inch aluminium wheel, checker black design floor mat, body colour air conditioning outlet, accented coloured sleeve, MMI 3G+navigation, choice of 4 body colours (Ice Silver, Glacier White, Misano Red, Phantom Black).

The vehicles went on sale on 29 October 2013.

==== A1 competition kits (2010–) ====
The A1 competition kits include adhesive film decals, vibrant paint finishes, exterior add-on parts, and a matching interior, available under the Audi Genuine Accessories (AOZ) program.

The 'competition kit Aerodynamic' includes a front spoiler lip, side sills, rear diffuser and – depending on the vehicle configuration – sport exhaust tips. Customers can also order a roof spoiler for the A1.

The 'competition kit legends interior plus' includes Amalfi White body colour, front spoiler lip and rear diffuser in Begonia Red, legends graphics with gloss-black Number 1 on the hood and the doors, decorative bezels for the rearview mirror, air vents, door pull handles, centre console; black cloth floor mats with Begonia Red, Stone Gray and Gray Brown strips; colour accent on the leather sport steering wheel, gear shift lever and parking brake lever.

The kits were available upon the vehicles' market launch.

==== Competition kit R18 (2013–) ====
The Competition kit R18 is based on the look of the Audi R18 e-tron quattro race car and has been reinterpreted for the Audi A1 as competition kit R18 gray and R18 red. A version of the Audi A1 with competition kit R18 was unveiled in Wörthersee Tour 2013.

=== Audi S1 ===
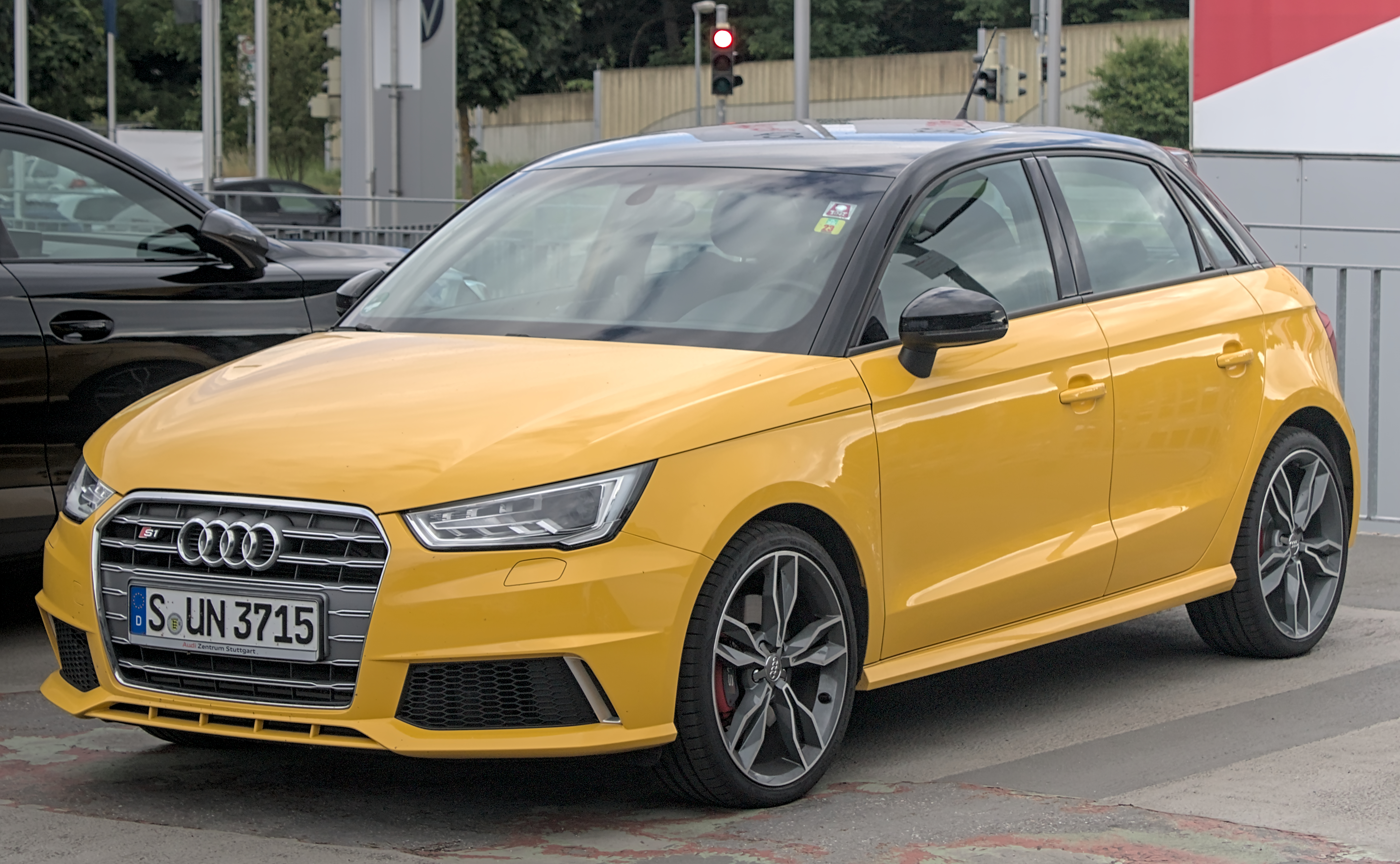
Audi S1

In 2014, the Audi S1 was released, a performance version of the A1. It was Audi's smallest S model car. It was discontinued in 2018. The S1 is powered by a 2.0-litre inline-four EA888 engine producing 172 kW; 234 PS (231 bhp) and 370 N⋅m (273 lb⋅ft) of torque.

=== Motorsports ===
An A1 e-tron won the 2011 Silvretta Electric Car Rally.

=== Awards ===
The Audi A1 1.4 TFSI Sport was awarded "Car of the Year 2011" by the British What Car? magazine.

=== Marketing ===
As part of the Audi A1 launch, Justin Timberlake became an Audi brand ambassador starting in 2010.

As part of the Audi A1 launch, Audi Space became available for PlayStation Home, including a virtual Audi A1 showroom in 2010-02-11.

As part of the Audi A1 launch, a free iPhone and iPod Touch rhythm driving game called 'Audi A1 Beat Driver' was released on 2010-04-19. The games features an international high score list, option for subscribing to a newsletter with the latest news and information about Audi A1, and nine different rock songs ("Accelerate" by Torpedo, "I'm A Rope" by Tommy Sparks, "Strength in Numbers" by The Music, "Farewell to the Fairground" by White Lies, "Gold Guns Girls" by Metric, "1989" by The Rakes, "Bulletproof" by La Roux, "Digital Age" by The Fall and "Want U" by Lo-Fi-Fnk). The updated iPhone & iPod touch version includes 8 new music tracks ("Gimme Sympathy" by Metric, "I'm Not Your Toy – Jack Beats Remix" by La Roux, "Love Affair Strapped in Electric Chair" by Torpedo, "Suburbia" by Spleen United, "Death" by White Lies, "Where I Belong (Life Is A Festival)" by Don Diablo, "Earthquake threat" by Torpedo, "A Funny Thing (Dan Grech Final Mix)" by Penguin Prison). iPad version includes 2 more new songs for total of 19 songs ("Self Machine" by I Blame Coco, "City Limits" by I Am Giant). The game was produced by Veemee.

Veemee produced Audi S1 Sledge video game for PlayStation 3, available via PlayStation Home. The updated version includes multiplayer support where player can race six players at one time with voice communication. Audi S1 sledge was designed by Miroslaw Leczek.

The Audi A1 has been promoted using a viral internet video release entitled "The Next Big Thing", starring Justin Timberlake. Six episodes have been created and are available to view online.

As part of the Audi A1 launch in Taiwan, Ethan Juan became the Audi's Taiwan brand ambassador in 2011. As part of the deal, Audi supplied Juan with an Audi S4 as transport for 1 year.

As part of the Audi A1 clubsport quattro premiere at Wörthersee Tour 2011 and Need for Speed World reaching 5 million registered users, the vehicle could be driven in Need for Speed World as a free in-game rental car between 2011-06-01 and 2011-06-04. The in-game vehicle was subsequently made available by using a redeem code as part of the game's 30 million registrations celebration. An updated version, called Audi A1 clubsport quattro Speed Edition, was available for 20 Audi Retweet contest winners hosted by Twitter between 2011-06-21 and 2011-06-26.

Philipp und Keuntje GmbH and Everybody All Together produced Audi A1 eCatalogue for Apple iPad, which allows the viewer to change the colour of the car on almost every page, and included a 3D driving simulation.

As part of the A1 Sportback Urban Style Limited launch in Japan, an Audi A1 present campaign was held between 2013-06-07 and 2013-07-31, where an A1 Sportback Urban Style Limited was given away as A-prize.

=== 2015 facelift ===
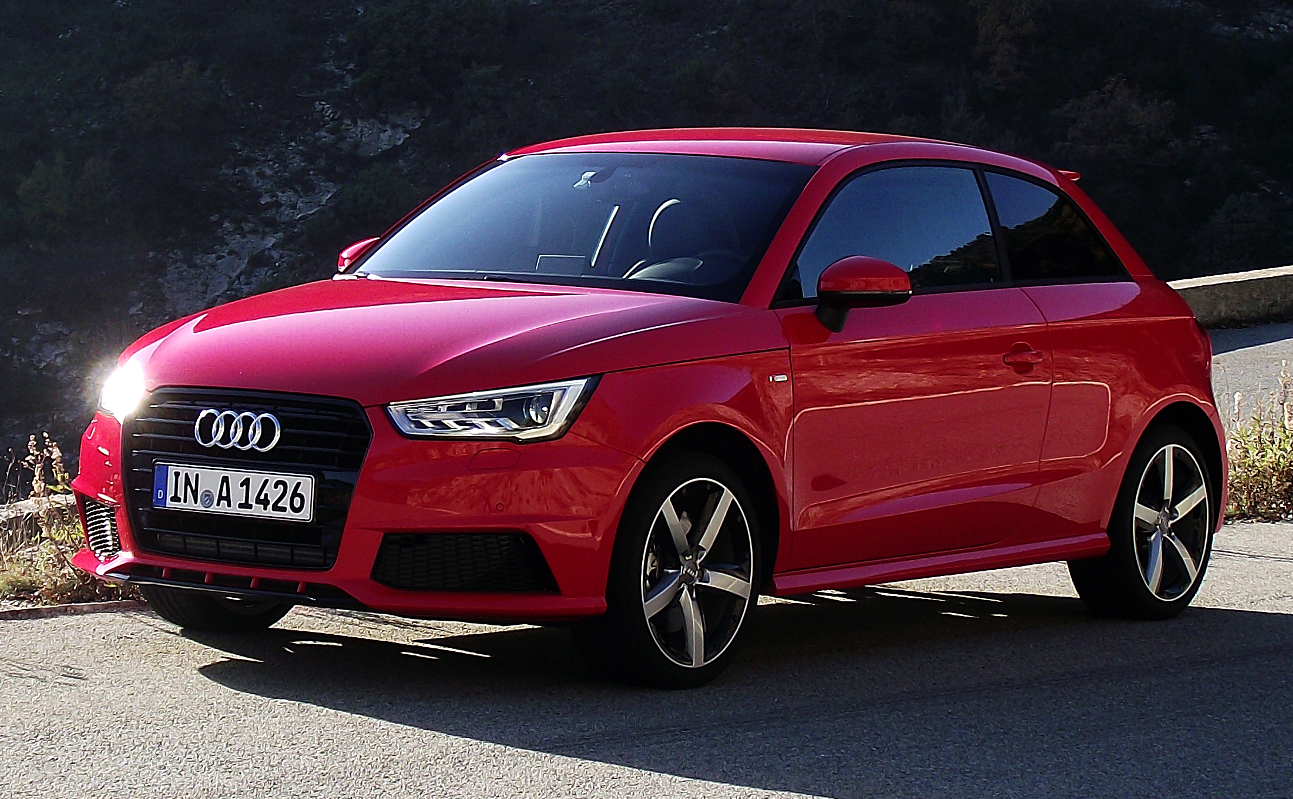
2015 Audi A1 3-door

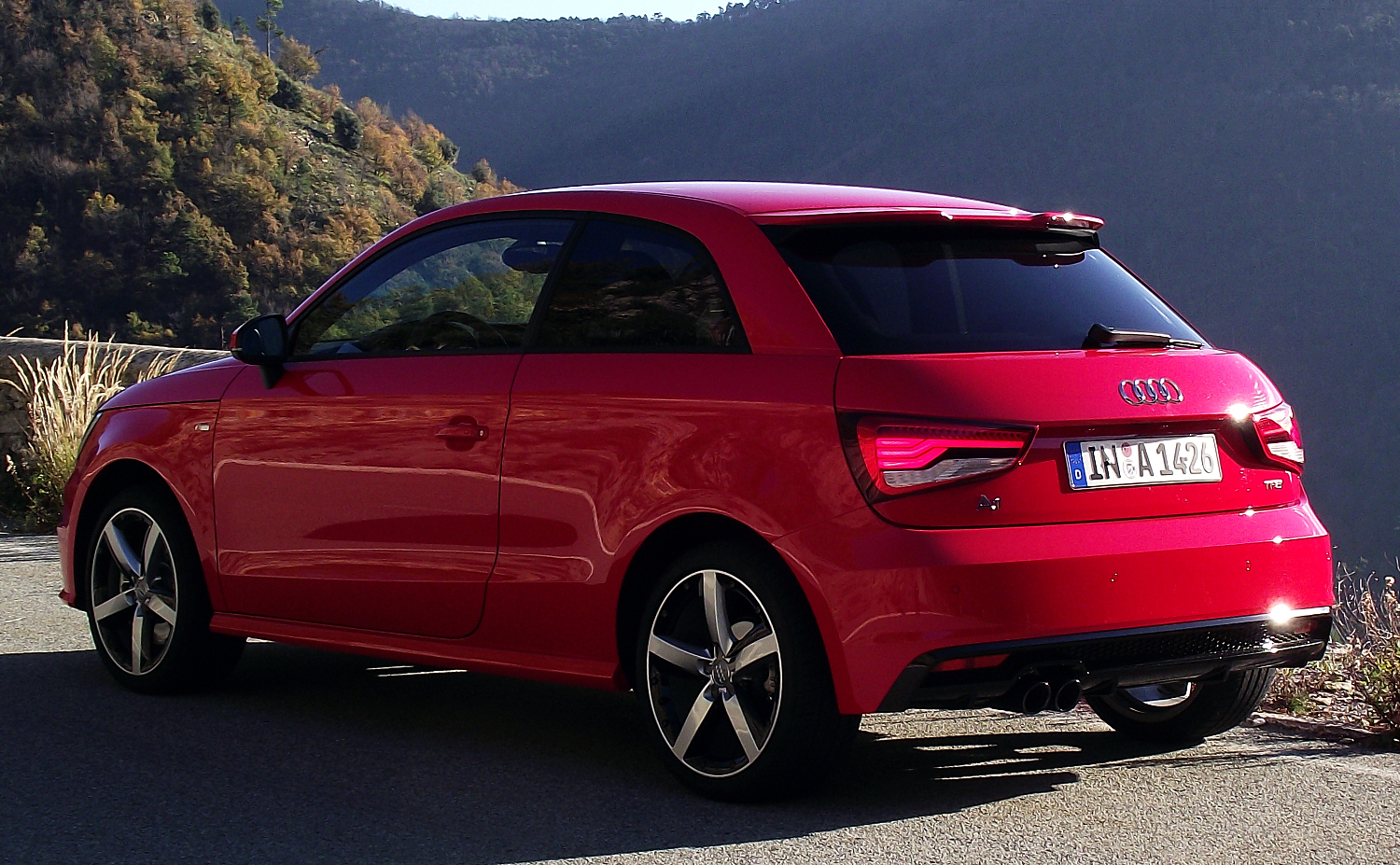
2015 Audi A1 3-door

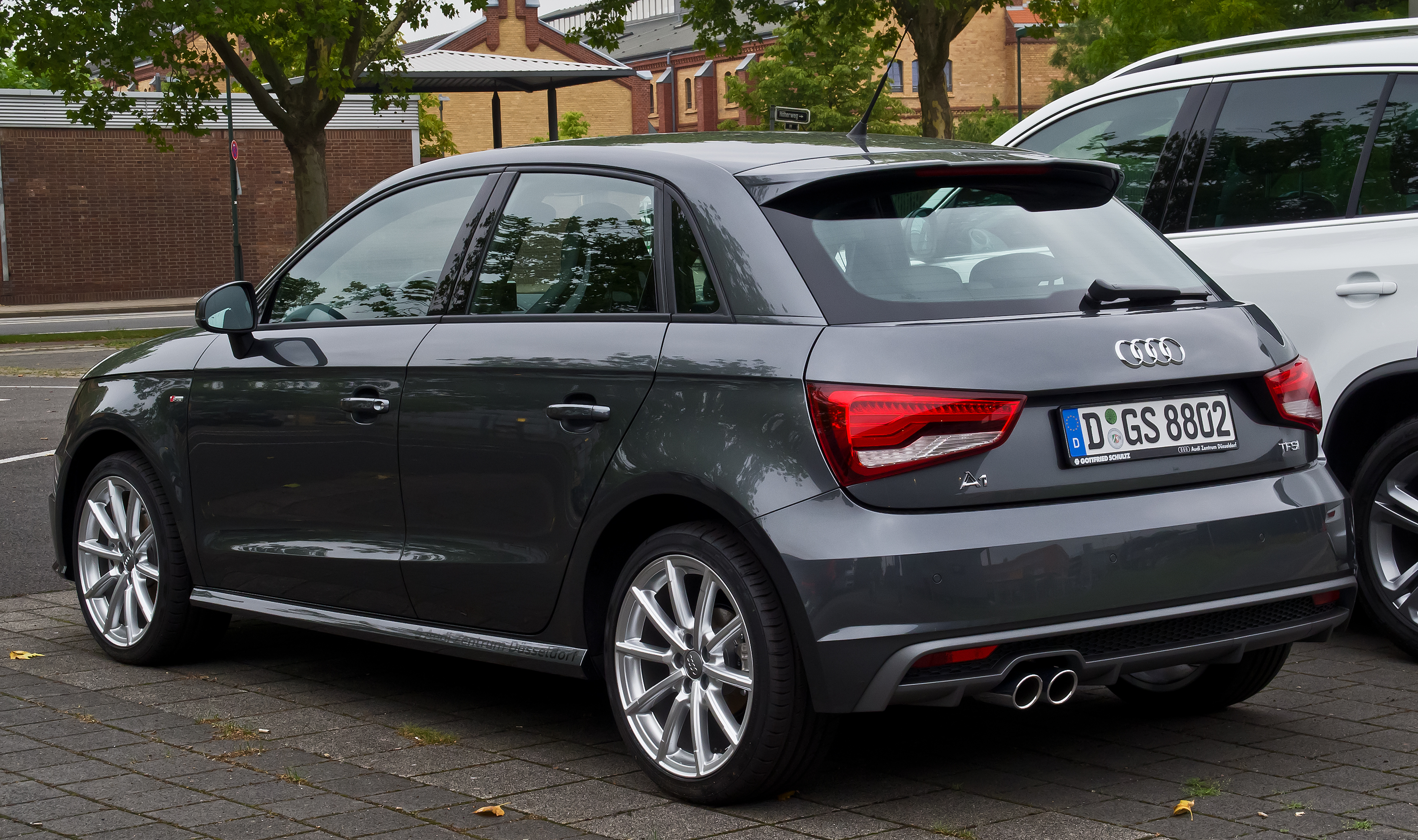
2015 Audi A1 Sportback

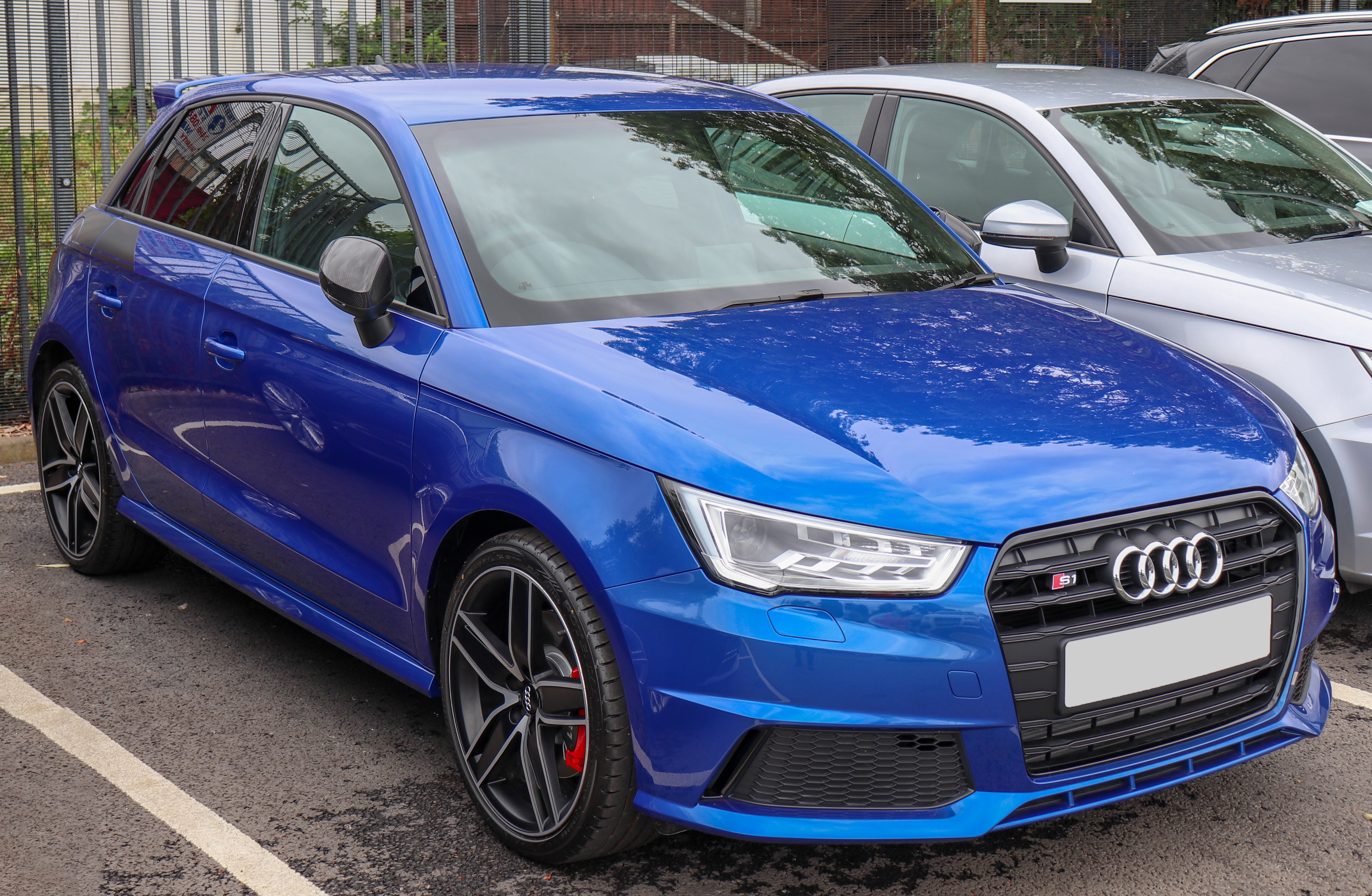
2018 Audi S1

== Second generation (GB; 2018) ==
Second generation
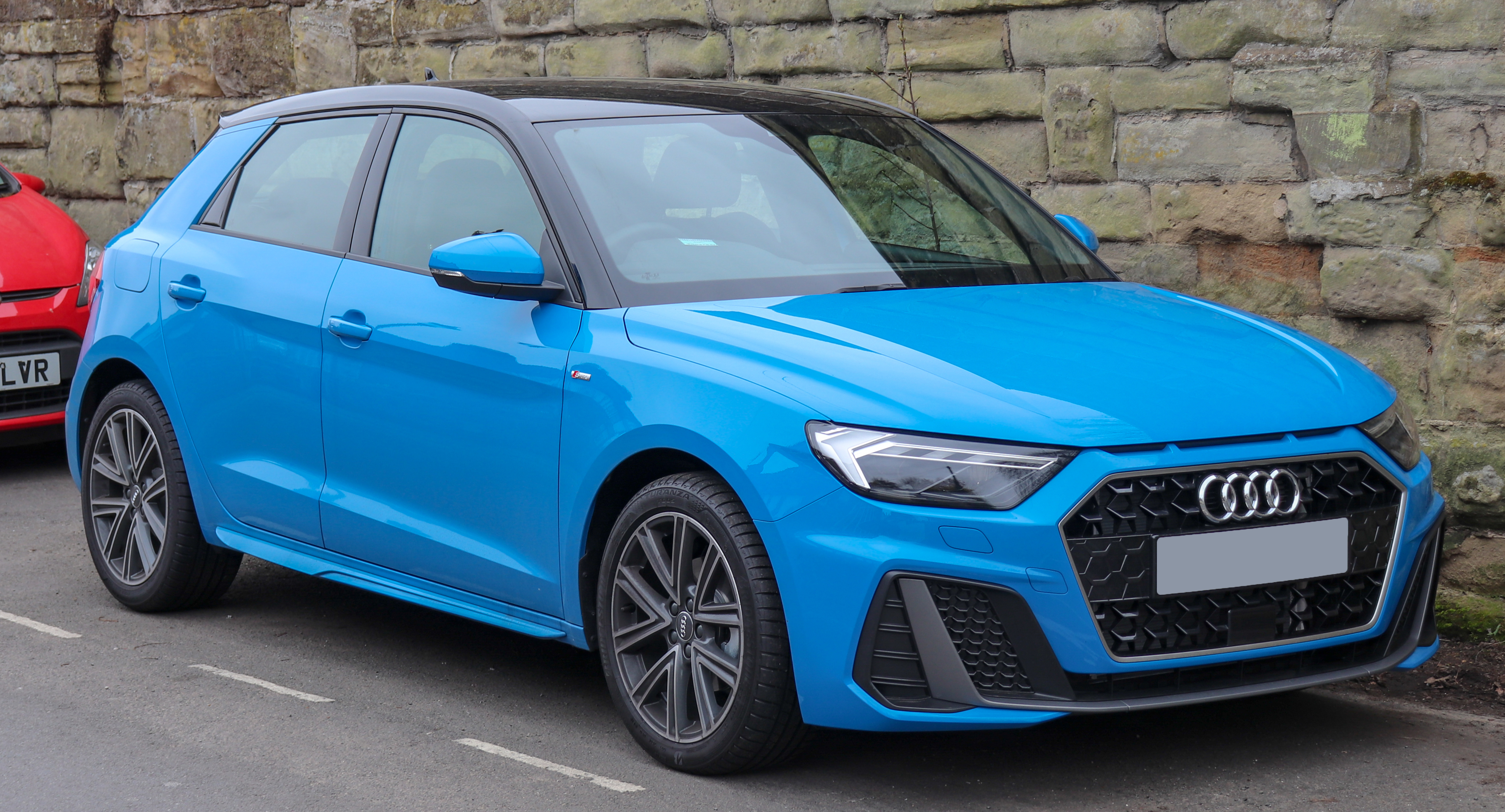

Overview
- Model code: GB
- Production: October 2018 – April 2026
- Assembly: Spain: Martorell, Catalonia (SEAT)
- Designer: Doojin Choi, Thomas Bühner and Fabian Weinert under Jürgen Löffler (exterior); Chan Park (interior)

Body and chassis
- Body style: 5-door hatchback
- Layout: Front-engine, front-wheel-drive
- Platform: Volkswagen Group MQB A0
- Related: Volkswagen Polo Mk6; SEAT Ibiza Mk5

Powertrain
- Engine: petrol: 1.0 L EA211/EA211 DHSB TFSI I3; 1.5 L EA211 EVO series TFSI I4; 2.0 L EA888 TFSI I4
- Transmission: 5-speed manual 6-speed manual 6-speed S tronic 7-speed S tronic

Dimensions
- Wheelbase: 2,563 mm (100.9 in)
- Length: 4,029 mm (158.6 in)
- Width: 1,740 mm (68.5 in)
- Height: 1,409 mm (55.5 in)
- Kerb weight: 1,165–1,335 kg (2,568–2,943 lb)

The second generation A1 was launched in mid-June 2018. It is built on the MQB platform which is shared with the Volkswagen Polo Mk6 and the SEAT Ibiza Mk5.

This generation came to Mexico in 25 October 2019.

=== A1 Sportback (2018–2026) ===
European models went on sale in late 2018, with ordering commencing a few months earlier in mid-2018.

=== A1 citycarver / allstreet (2019–2026) ===
It is a version of the A1 Sportback with 4 centimetres (1.6 in) of additional ground clearance, increased ride height by 35 millimetres (1.4 in), a choice of 9 body colours, and a contrasting roof in either Mythos black metallic or Manhattan gray metallic. The black styling package includes gray lower body section, deep black stainless steel paint finish.

Ordering began in August 2019, and arrived at European dealerships in late 2019.

In the UK, Audi removed the A1 citycarver from the range in 2021 due to slow sales.

In May 2022, the A1 citycarver was renamed A1 Allstreet (in reference to Audi Allroad range).

=== Equipment ===
The A1 features MMI radio and Audi smartphone interface, which includes Apple CarPlay and Android Auto as standard, as well as a 10.25-inch infotainment touchscreen.

In the UK, the trim levels include SE, Sport and S line from the previous generation along with three new S Line trims; S Line Competition, S Line Contrast Edition and S Line Style Edition. SE is the base specification, while Sport and S line models features sport seats, sports suspension, exterior styling and larger wheels, as well as other features.

In 2021, the S line competition package is available for Sportback 40 TFSI, 35 TFSI, 30 TFSI.

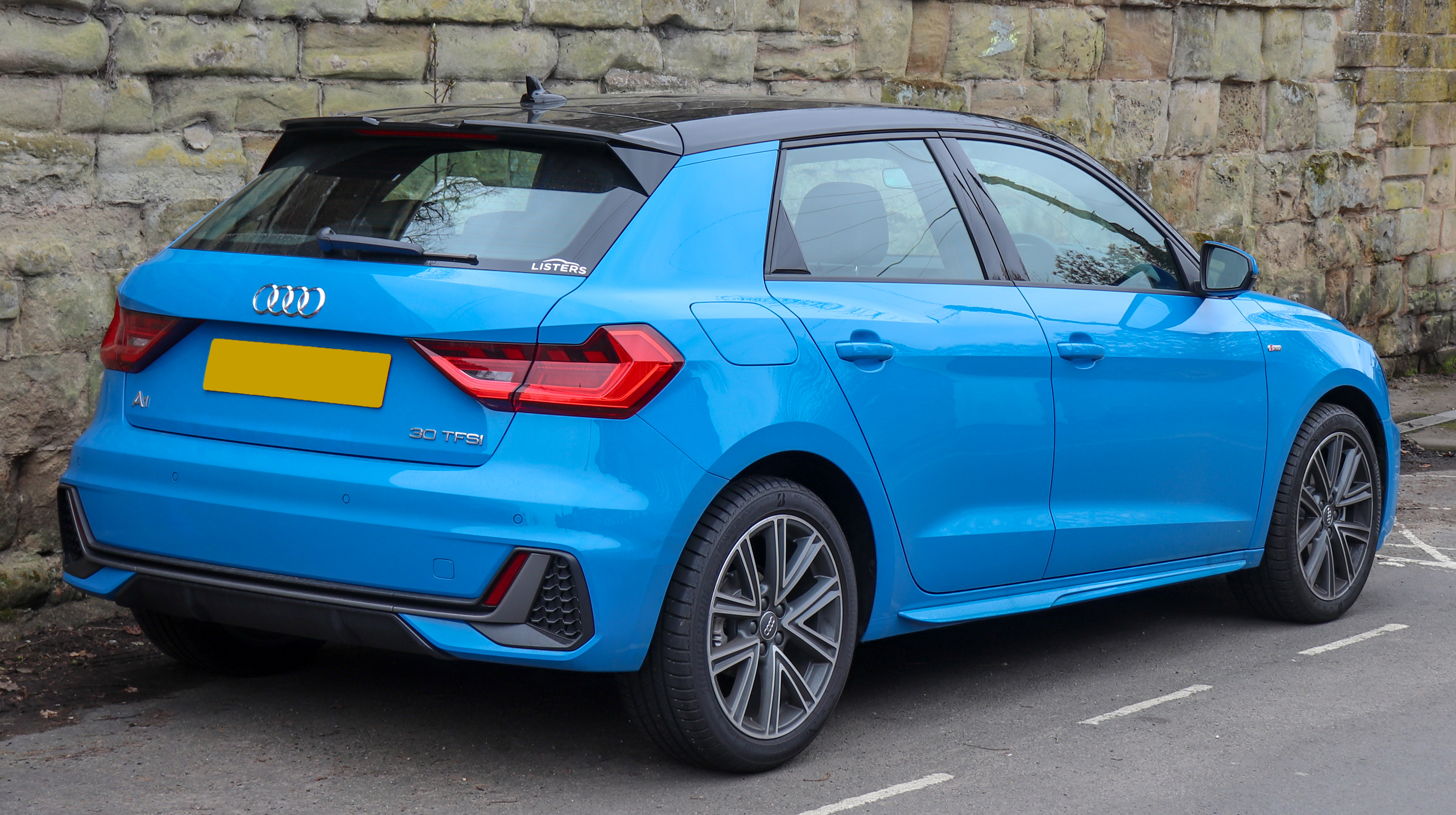
Rear

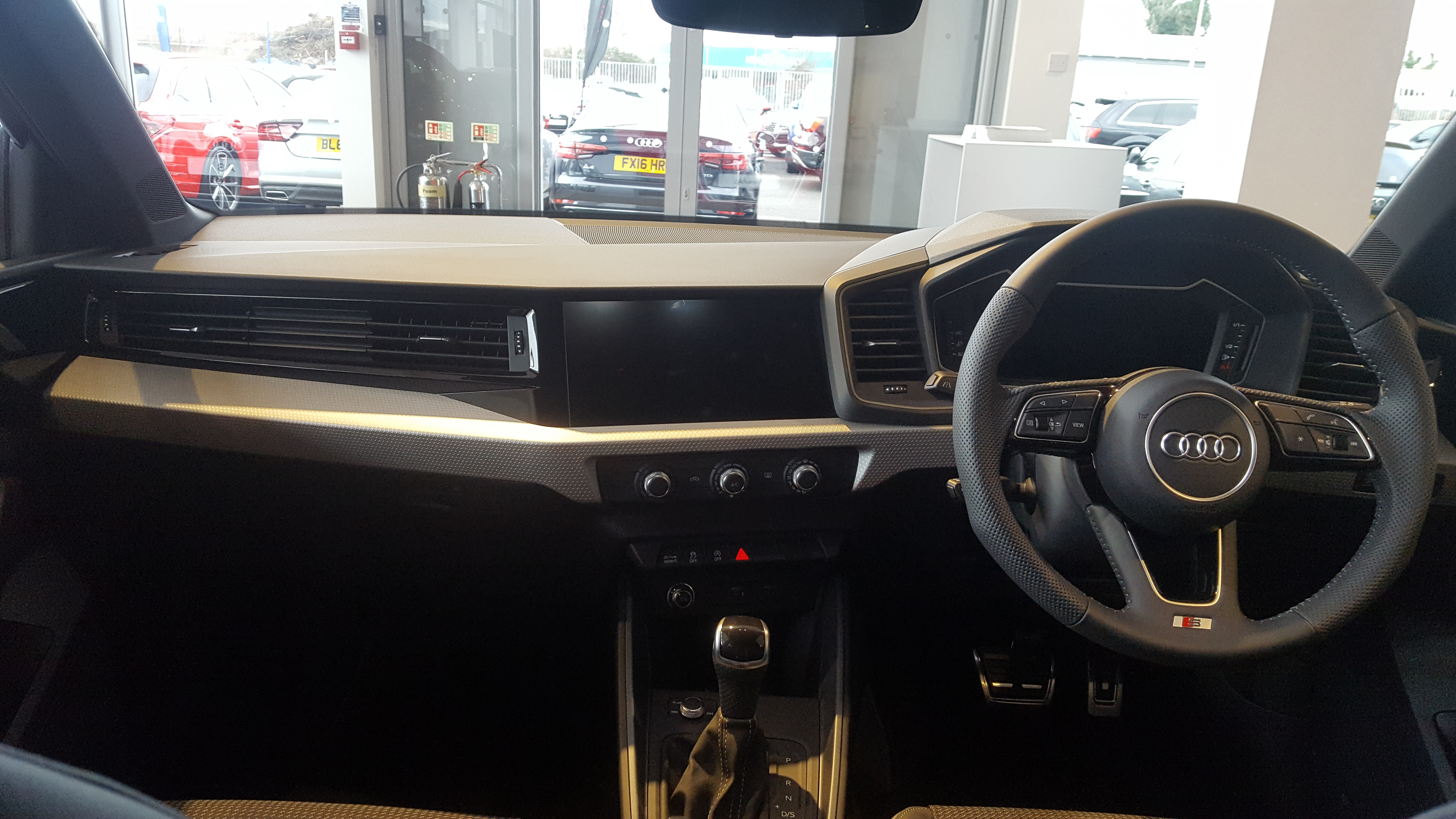
Interior

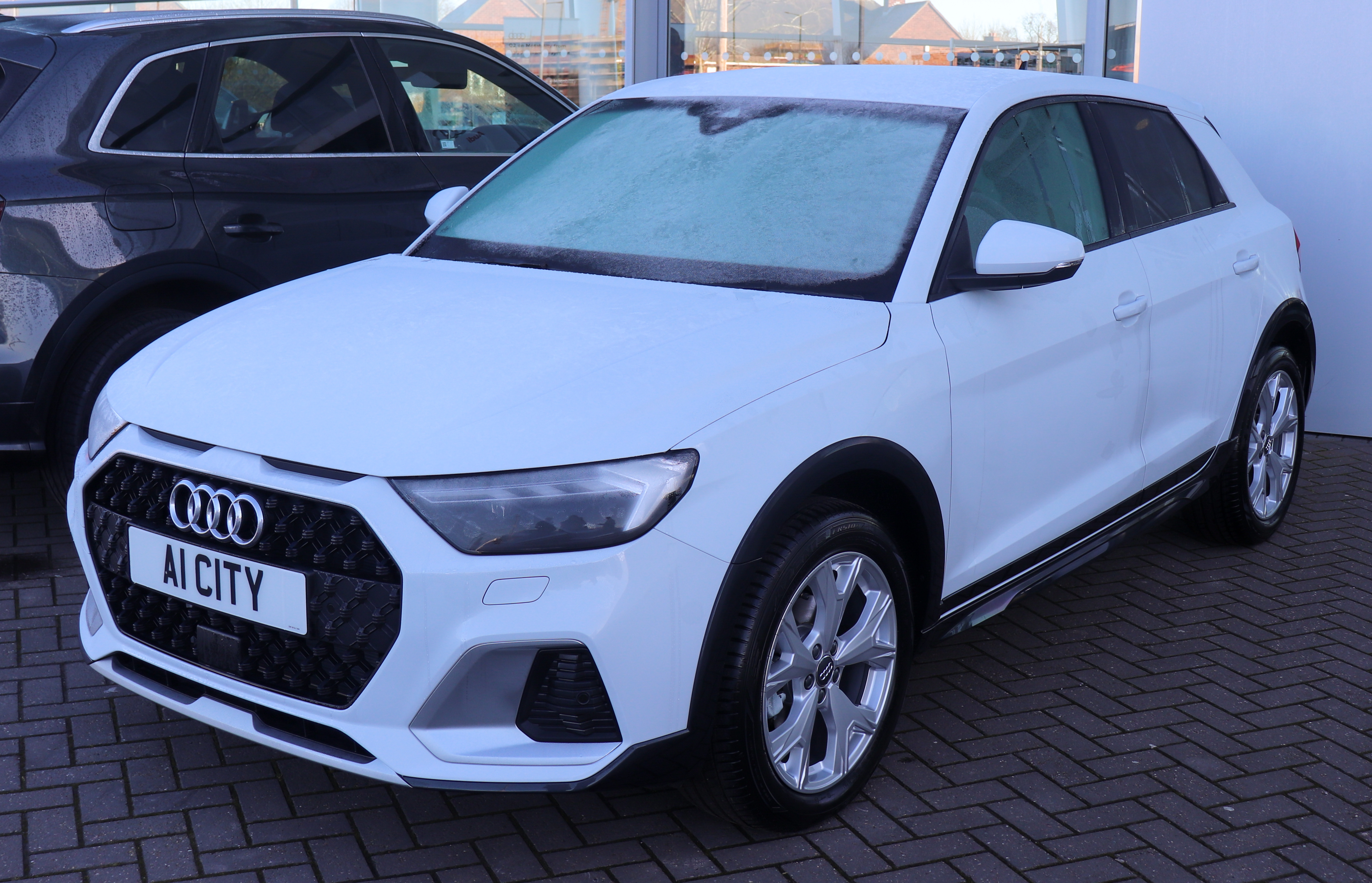
A1 Citycarver

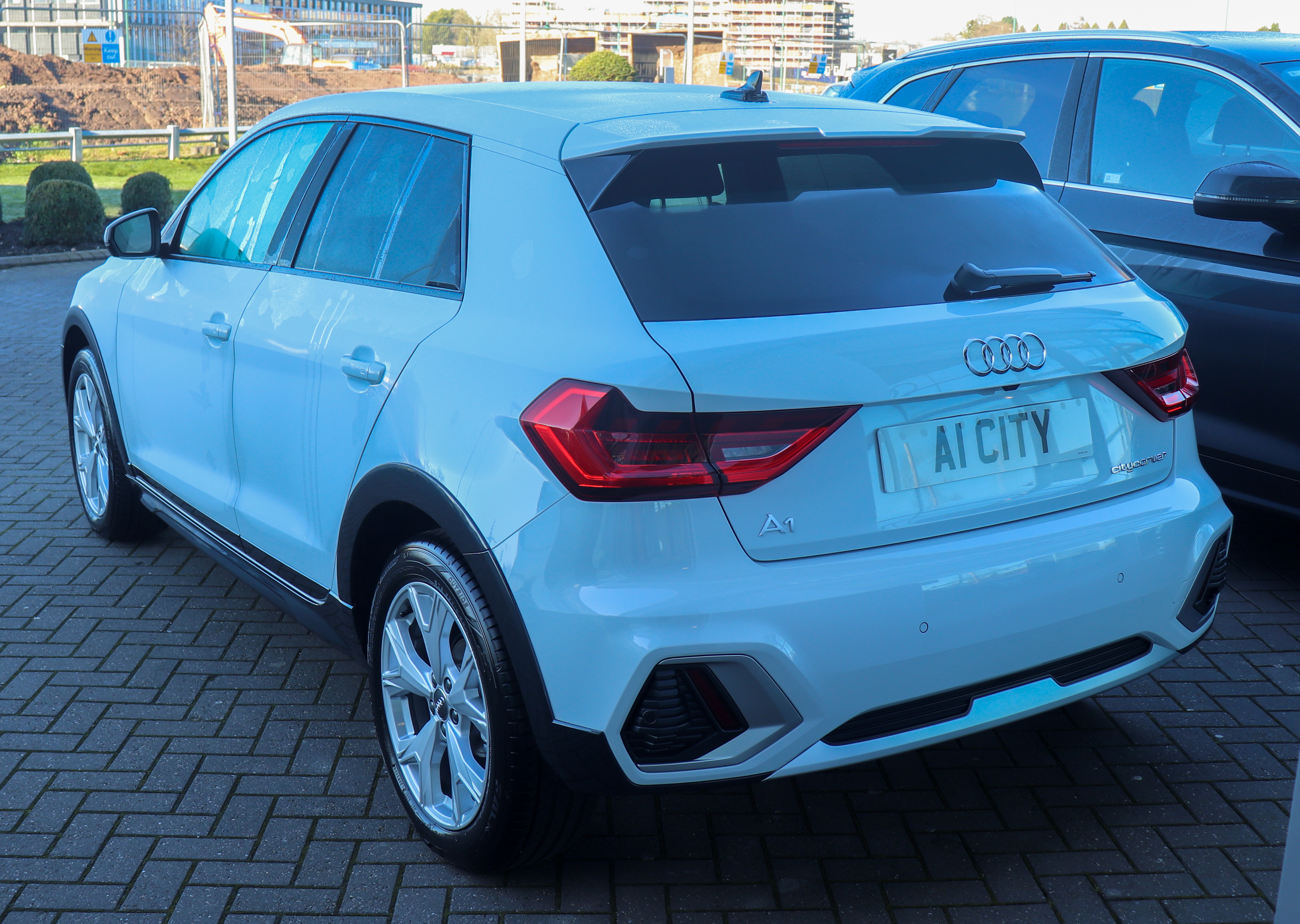
Rear

=== Engines ===
Unlike its predecessor, the second generation Audi A1 does not offer diesel engines, but instead four petrol variants: the entry-level 25 TFSI (95 PS), the 30 TFSI (110 / 116 PS) with a 1.0 litre three-cylinder engine respectively, the 35 TFSI (150 PS) with a 1.5-litre four-cylinder engine and the 40 TFSI (200 PS) with a 2.0 litre four-cylinder engine along with 6-speed manual or 7-speed S tronic transmission. The 25 TFSI (95 PS) is equipped with a 5-speed manual.

Petrol engines
| Model | Years | Type | Engine code | Power | Torque | Transmission |
|---|---|---|---|---|---|---|
| 25 TFSI/1.0 TFSI | 2018–2026 | 999 cc I3 (EA211) | CHZB | 95 PS (70 kW; 94 bhp) | 175 N⋅m (129 lb⋅ft) | 5-speed manual or 7-speed S tronic |
| 30 TFSI/1.0 TFSI | 2020–2026 | 999 cc I3 (EA211) | DSHA | 110 PS (81 kW; 108 bhp) | 175 N⋅m (129 lb⋅ft) | 6-speed manual or 7-speed S tronic |
| 30 TFSI/1.0 TFSI | 2018–2026 | 999 cc I3 (EA211) | CHZD | 116 PS (85 kW; 114 bhp) | 200 N⋅m (148 lb⋅ft) | 6-speed manual or 7-speed S tronic |
| 35 TFSI/1.5 TFSI | 2018–2026 | 1,498 cc I4 (EA211) | DADA, DPCA, DXDB | 150 PS (110 kW; 148 bhp) | 250 N⋅m (184 lb⋅ft) | 6-speed manual or 7-speed S tronic (automatic only on Citycarver) |
| 40 TFSI/2.0 TFSI | 2018–2026 | 1,984 cc I4 (EA888) | CZPC, DKZC | 200 PS (147 kW; 197 bhp) | 320 N⋅m (236 lb⋅ft) | 6-speed S tronic |

=== Safety ===
ANCAP test results Audi A1 all variants (2019, aligned with Euro NCAP)
| Test | Points | % |
|---|---|---|
| Overall: | 5 /5 stars | |
| Adult occupant: | 36.2 | 95% |
| Child occupant: | 43.3 | 88% |
| Pedestrian: | 35 | 73% |
| Safety assist: | 10.6 | 82% |

Euro NCAP test results Audi A1 sportback (2019)
| Test | Points | % |
|---|---|---|
| Overall: | 5 /5 stars | |
| Adult occupant: | 36.2 | 95% |
| Child occupant: | 42 | 85% |
| Pedestrian: | 35.1 | 73% |
| Safety assist: | 10.4 | 80% |

== Production ==
=== First generation (2010–2018) ===
Manufacturing commenced at Audi's Brussels plant in Belgium. The A1 was the first model to be manufactured exclusively in the European capital..

2010–2018: During this period, the Brussels plant produced nearly 910,000 Audi A1 vehicles.

August 1, 2018: The last first-generation Audi A1 rolled off the production line in Brussels, marking the end of an era for the model at this site.

=== Second generation (2018–2026) ===
Production Shift: Production moved to SEAT's Martorell plant in Spain, reflecting Audi's strategy to optimize manufacturing across the Volkswagen Group.

In an interview by Automotive News Europe, Audi's CEO, Markus Duesmann, announced that once the second generation Audi A1's lifecycle ends, it will be discontinued with no successor, due to tighter European emissions standards, leaving the A3 as their entry-level model.. Production ended in April 2026.
