= 2016 World RX of Germany =

Rallycross event

- Round 11 of 12 in the 2016 FIA World Rallycross Championship
- Date: 15–16 October 2016
- Location: Buxtehude, Lower Saxony
- Venue: Estering

Results
Heat winners
- Heat 1: (Latvia) Jānis Baumanis; World RX Team Austria
- Heat 2: (Sweden) Mattias Ekström; EKS RX
- Heat 3: (Norway) Petter Solberg; Petter Solberg World RX Team
- Heat 4: (Norway) Petter Solberg; Petter Solberg World RX Team
Semi-final winners
- Semi-final 1: (Norway) Petter Solberg; Petter Solberg World RX Team
- Semi-final 2: (Sweden) Mattias Ekström; EKS RX
Final
- First: (Sweden) Kevin Eriksson; Olsbergs MSE
- Second: (Norway) Petter Solberg; Petter Solberg World RX Team
- Third: (Norway) Andreas Bakkerud; Hoonigan Racing Division

World RX layout of Estering

The 2016 World RX of Germany was the eleventh round of the third season of the FIA World Rallycross Championship. The event was held at the Estering in Buxtehude, Lower Saxony. Mattias Ekström won his maiden World Championship with a round to spare, holding a 30-point buffer to nearest rival Petter Solberg.

== Heats ==
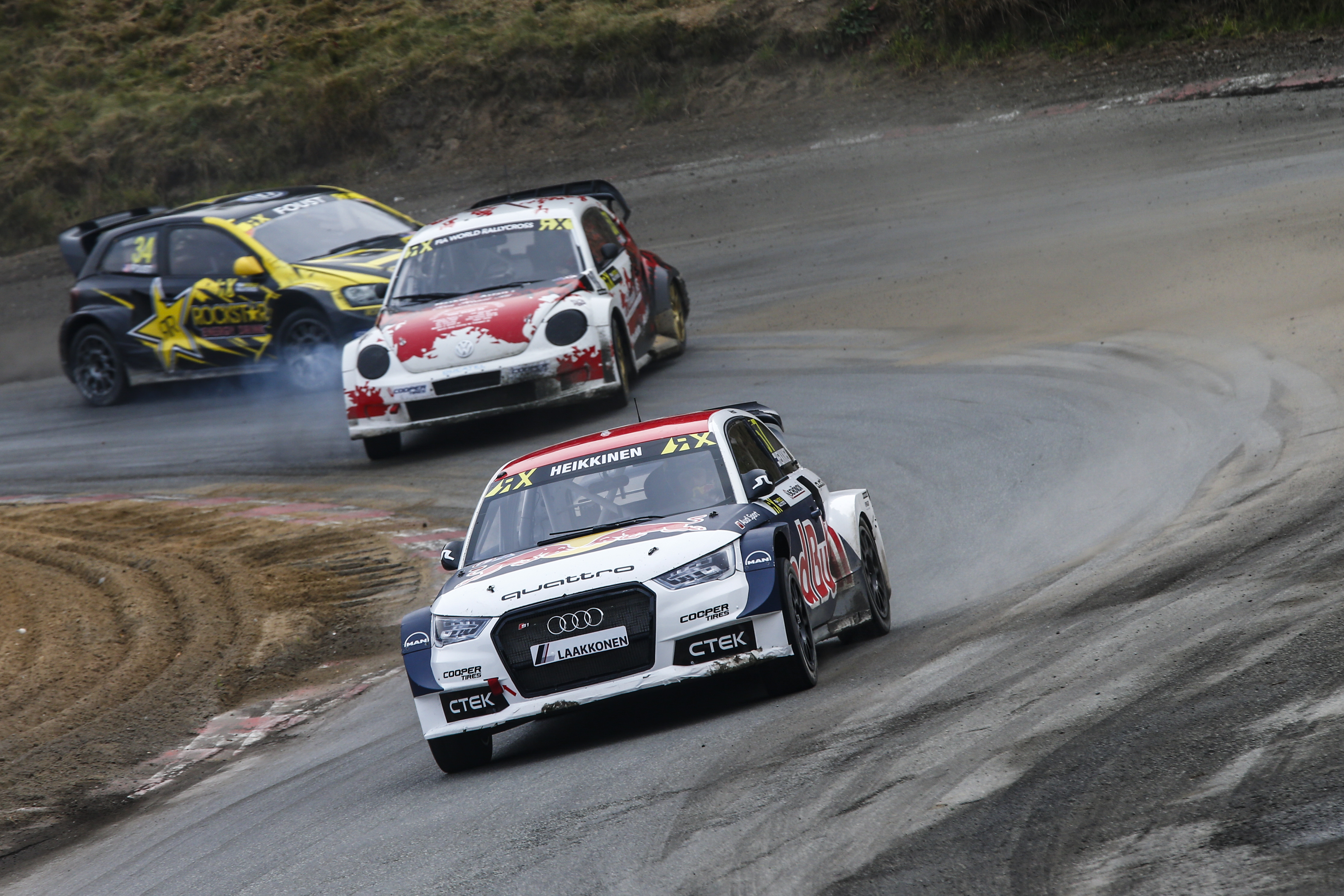
Toomas Heikkinen, Alexander Hvaal and Tanner Foust

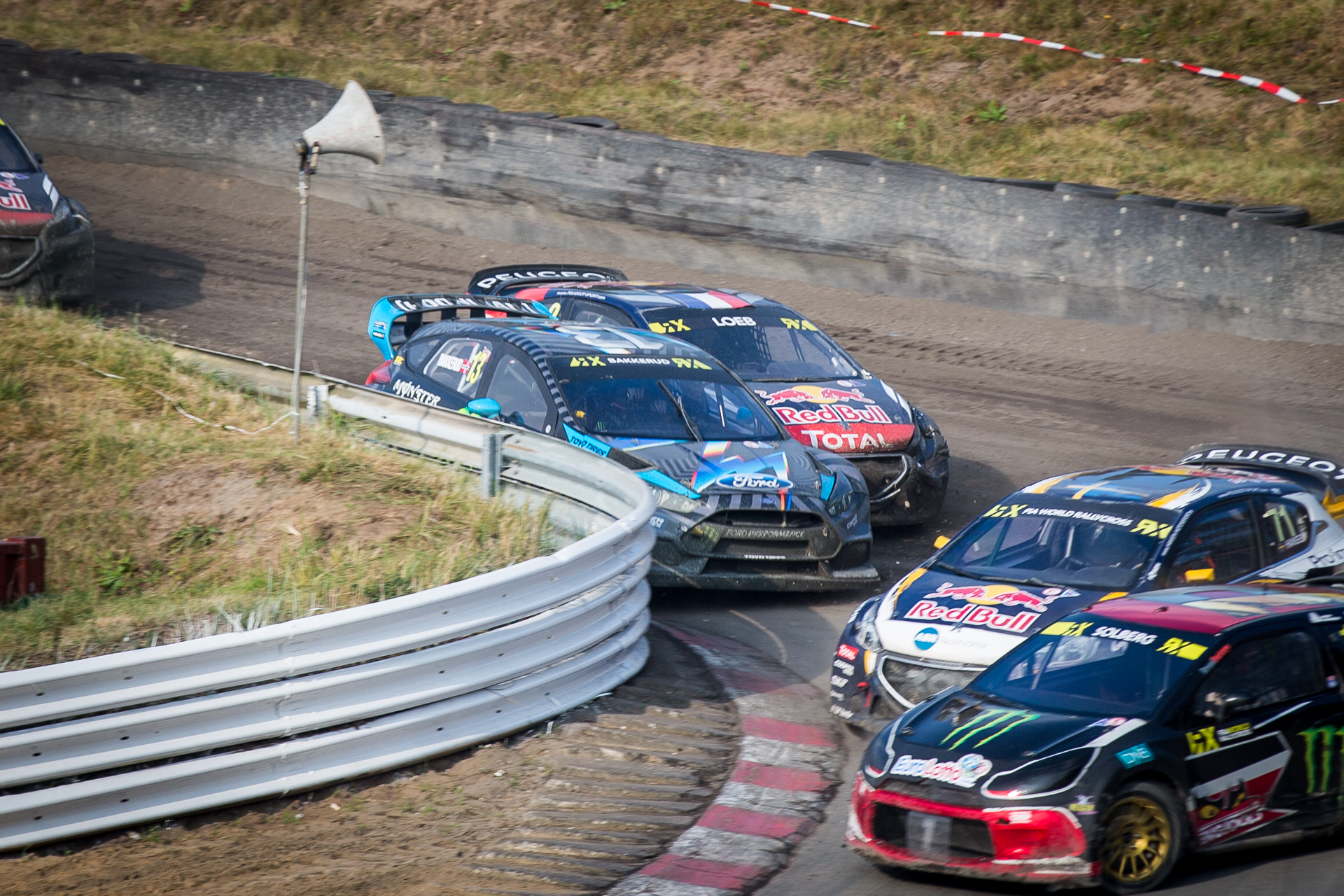
Solberg, Kevin Hansen, Bakkerud, Loeb and Timmy Hansen

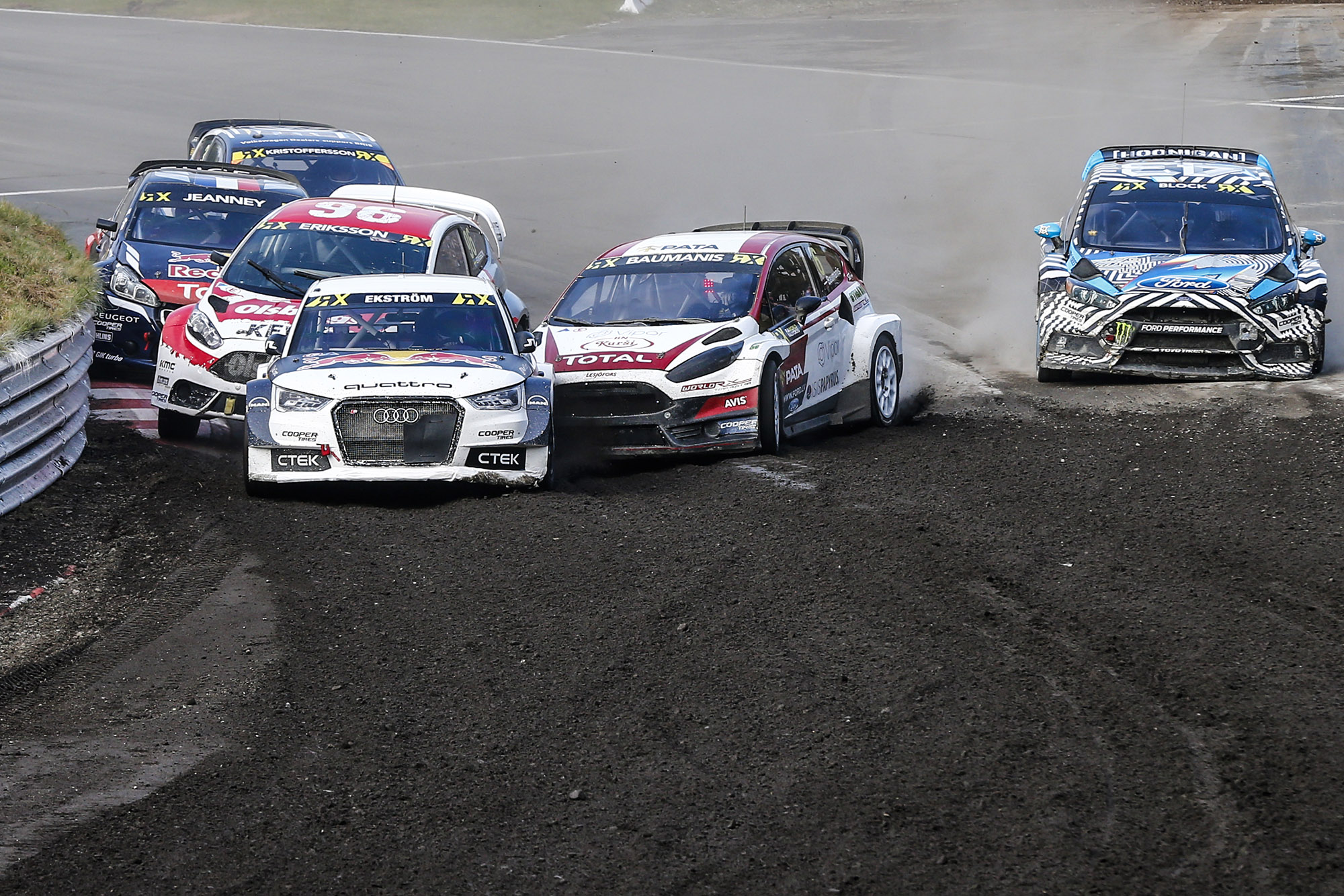
The run to the first turn in semi-final 2

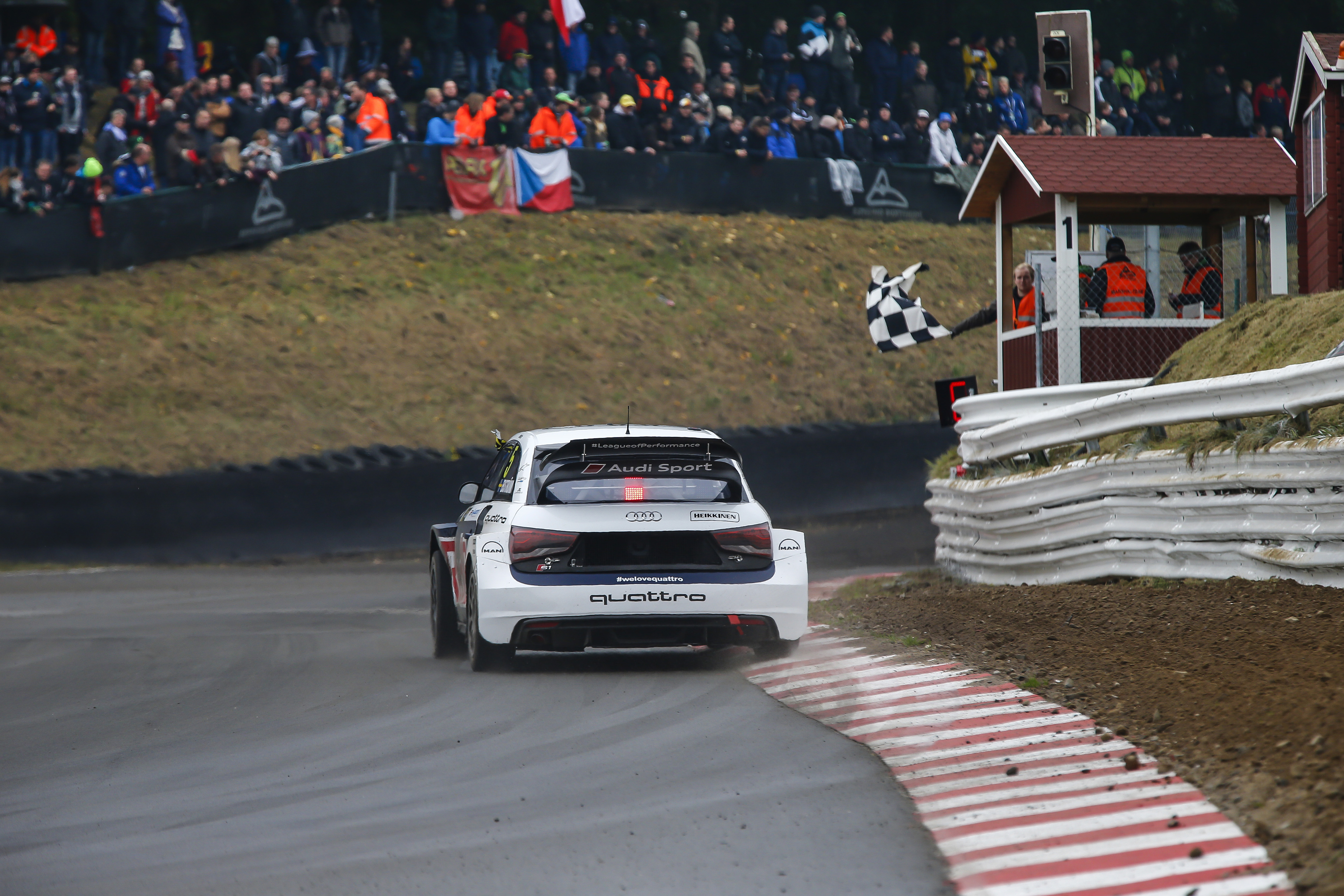
Ekström wrapped up the drivers' title with a round to spare

Pos.	No.	Driver	Team	Car	Q1	Q2	Q3	Q4	Pts
1	1	(Norway) Petter Solberg	Petter Solberg World RX Team	Citroën DS3	12th	3rd	1st	1st	16
2	5	(Sweden) Mattias Ekström	EKS RX	Audi S1	3rd	1st	4th	4th	15
3	71	(Sweden) Kevin Hansen	Peugeot Hansen Academy	Peugeot 208	9th	10th	3rd	2nd	14
4	6	(Latvia) Jānis Baumanis	World RX Team Austria	Ford Fiesta	1st	4th	7th	15th	13
5	9	(France) Sébastien Loeb	Team Peugeot-Hansen	Peugeot 208	10th	5th	2nd	7th	12
6	3	(Sweden) Johan Kristoffersson	Volkswagen RX Sweden	Volkswagen Polo	5th	8th	5th	6th	11
7	13	(Norway) Andreas Bakkerud	Hoonigan Racing Division	Ford Focus RS	4th	6th	6th	11th	10
8	96	(Sweden) Kevin Eriksson	Olsbergs MSE	Ford Fiesta ST	11th	7th	12th	3rd	9
9	57	(Finland) Toomas Heikkinen	EKS RX	Audi S1	2nd	11th	18th	5th	8
10	17	(France) Davy Jeanney	Peugeot Hansen Academy	Peugeot 208	8th	2nd	10th	16th	7
11	21	(Sweden) Timmy Hansen	Team Peugeot-Hansen	Peugeot 208	6th	12th	8th	12th	6
12	43	(United States) Ken Block	Hoonigan Racing Division	Ford Focus RS	7th	13th	13th	10th	5
13	4	(Sweden) Robin Larsson	Larsson Jernberg Motorsport	Audi A1	15th	9th	17th	8th	4
14	7	(Russia) Timur Timerzyanov	World RX Team Austria	Ford Fiesta	14th	14th	14th	18th	3
15	92	(Sweden) Anton Marklund	Volkswagen RX Sweden	Volkswagen Polo	13th	17th	15th	17th	2
16	8	(Sweden) Peter Hedström	Hedströms Motorsport	Volkswagen Polo	16th	16th	11th	21st	1
17	113	(France) Cyril Raymond	Olsbergs MSE	Ford Fiesta	21st	15th	20th	13th	
18	34	(United States) Tanner Foust	Volkswagen RX Sweden	Volkswagen Polo	17th	24th	9th	19th	
19	68	(Finland) Niclas Grönholm	Olsbergs MSE	Ford Fiesta ST	19th	23rd	26th	9th	
20	60	(Finland) Joni-Pekka Rajala	Eklund Motorsport	Mitsubishi Mirage	23rd	20th	21st	23rd	
21	65	(France) Guerlain Chicherit	JRM Racing	BMW MINI Countryman	22nd	22nd	24th	25th	
22	53	(Norway) Alexander Hvaal	Eklund Motorsport	Volkswagen Beetle	25th	19th	27th	20th	
23	25	(Italy) Gigi Galli	Gigi Galli	Kia Rio	20th	25th	19th	26th	
24	55	(Germany) René Münnich	All-Inkl.com Münnich Motorsport	SEAT Ibiza	DNS	18th	22nd	14th	
25	24	(Norway) Tommy Rustad	All-Inkl.com Münnich Motorsport	SEAT Ibiza	18th	EXC	16th	DNF	
26	49	(Belgium) "M.D.K."	"M.D.K."	Ford Fiesta	EXC	21st	23rd	22nd	
27	80	(Germany) Andreas Steffen	Andreas Steffen	Ford Fiesta	24th	EXC	25th	24th	

== Semi-finals ==
Semi-final 1

Pos.	No.	Driver	Team	Time	Pts
1	1	(Norway) Petter Solberg	Petter Solberg World RX Team	3:50.866	6
2	71	(Sweden) Kevin Hansen	Peugeot Hansen Academy	+3.521	5
3	13	(Norway) Andreas Bakkerud	Hoonigan Racing Division	+3.882	4
4	21	(Sweden) Timmy Hansen	Team Peugeot-Hansen	+5.887	3
5	9	(France) Sébastien Loeb	Team Peugeot-Hansen	+7.155	2
6	57	(Finland) Toomas Heikkinen	EKS RX	+7.508	1

Semi-final 2

Pos.	No.	Driver	Team	Time	Pts
1	5	(Sweden) Mattias Ekström	EKS RX	3:50.650	6
2	96	(Sweden) Kevin Eriksson	Olsbergs MSE	+1.643	5
3	3	(Sweden) Johan Kristoffersson	Volkswagen RX Sweden	+3.551	4
4	6	(Latvia) Jānis Baumanis	World RX Team Austria	+5.877	3
5	17	(France) Davy Jeanney	Peugeot Hansen Academy	+18.432	2
6	43	(United States) Ken Block	Hoonigan Racing Division	DNF	1

== Final ==
Pos.	No.	Driver	Team	Time	Pts
1	96	(Sweden) Kevin Eriksson	Olsbergs MSE	3:51.944	8
2	1	(Norway) Petter Solberg	Petter Solberg World RX Team	+0.586	5
3	13	(Norway) Andreas Bakkerud	Hoonigan Racing Division	+2.421	4
4	71	(Sweden) Kevin Hansen	Peugeot Hansen Academy	+2.961	3
5	5	(Sweden) Mattias Ekström	EKS RX	+3.346	2
6	3	(Sweden) Johan Kristoffersson	Volkswagen RX Sweden	+21.962	1

== Standings after the event ==
Pos	Driver	Pts	Gap
WC	(Sweden) Mattias Ekström	251	
2	(Norway) Petter Solberg	221	+30
3	(Sweden) Johan Kristoffersson	217	+34
4	(Norway) Andreas Bakkerud	210	+41
5	(France) Sébastien Loeb	194	+57

Previous race: 2016 World RX of Latvia	FIA World Rallycross Championship; 2016 season	Next race: 2016 World RX of Argentina
Previous race: 2015 World RX of Germany	World RX of Germany	Next race: 2017 World RX of Germany
