= Olsbergs MSE =

Swedish auto racing team

(Sweden) Olsbergs MSE
- Founded: 2005
- Founder(s): Andréas Eriksson
- Base: Nynäshamn, Sweden
- Team principal(s): Andréas Eriksson
- Current series: FIA World Rallycross Championship; RX2; RallyX Nordic
- Former series: Global Rallycross; FIA European Rallycross Championship
- Current drivers: (Sweden) 6. Oliver Eriksson (Sweden) 23. Kevin Eriksson
- Noted drivers: (Norway) Andreas Bakkerud (United States) Tanner Foust (Finland) Marcus Grönholm (Finland) Toomas Heikkinen
- Teams' Championships: 2014 FIA WRX
- Drivers' Championships: 2012 GRC Foust; 2013 GRC Heikkinen; 2014 GRC Wiman

Olsbergs MSE, which also competes under the title OMSE, is an auto racing team founded by Swedish former rally champion Andréas Eriksson as Motorsport Evolution (MSE) in 2005. In 2008, it ran under the name Ford Team RS Europe, while in 2009, Swedish electro-hydraulic control systems manufacturer Olsbergs bought 50% of the team and it was renamed Olsbergs MSE.

The team has been competing in rallycross since its creation, and was backed by Ford Performance until 2015, and again in 2018.

The team is racing in the 2016 and 2017 Global Rallycross series with Honda Civic Coupés, backed by Honda Performance Development and Red Bull. OMSE is also the main promoter of the FIA World Rallycross Championship support RX2 Series (previously RX Lites).

== Racecar constructor ==
Year	Model	Picture	Engine	Class
2005	Ford Fiesta ST			Rallycross Division 1
2009	Ford Fiesta Pikes Peak			PPIHC Unlimited
2009	Ford Fiesta RX			Rallycross Supercars
2010	Gymkhana THREE Fiesta		Olsbergs I4	Gymkhana
2012	Dodge Dart			Global Rallycross Championship
2013	Supercar Lites		Ford Duratec 2.4 L I4	Rallycross Lites
2016	OMSE Fiesta RX		Ford Duratec 2.0 L I4	Rallycross Supercars
2017	Honda GRC Civic Coupe		Honda K20C2 2.0 L I4	Global Rallycross Championship
2018	OMSE Fiesta ST RX		OMSE 2.0 L I4	Rallycross Supercars
2021	OMSE ZEROID X1		QEV twin electric motors	RX2e
2022	OMSE FC1-X		TBA	Nitrocross

== Racing record ==
=== Complete FIA European Rallycross Championship results ===
(key)

==== Division 1 ====
Year	Entrant	Car	No.	Driver	1	2	3	4	5	6	7	8	9	10	11	ERX	Points
2005	MSE	Ford Fiesta ST	20	(Sweden) Andréas Eriksson	FRA	POR	AUT	CZE	NOR	SWE; 15	BEL	NED	POL	GER		45th	2
2006	Ford Team RS Sweden	Ford Fiesta ST	18	(Sweden) Andréas Eriksson	POR; NC	FRA; NC	CZE; 4	AUT; NC	SWE; 16	HUN	BEL; 11	NED; 3	NOR; 11	POL (15)	GER; 2	10th	58
2007	Ford Team RS Sweden	Ford Fiesta ST	10	(Sweden) Andréas Eriksson	POR; 5	FRA; 6	HUN; 4	AUT; 1	SWE (15)	NOR; 1	BEL; 6	NED (11)	POL; 3	CZE; 3		3rd	117
2008	Ford Team RS Europe	Ford Fiesta ST	3	(Sweden) Andréas Eriksson	POR (10)	FRA; 7	HUN; 3	AUT; 3	NOR; 5	SWE; 6	BEL (11)	NED; 9	CZE; 11	POL; 3	GER; 1	5th	112
2008	Ford Team RS Europe	Ford Fiesta ST	35	(Finland) Marcus Grönholm	POR	FRA	HUN	AUT	NOR	SWE; 1	BEL	NED; 10	CZE	POL; 12	GER	16th	32
2009	Ford Team RS Sweden	Ford Fiesta T16	5	(Sweden) Andréas Eriksson	GBR (11)	POR; 1	FRA; 10	HUN; 6	AUT; 5	SWE (28)	BEL; 16	GER; 2	POL; 1	CZE; 7		4th	98
2009	Ford Team RS Sweden	Ford Fiesta T16	64	(Norway) Henning Solberg	GBR	POR	FRA	HUN	AUT	SWE; 4	BEL	GER	POL	CZE; 5		15th	30
2010	Olsbergs MSE	Ford Fiesta T16	4	(Sweden) Andréas Eriksson	POR; 6	FRA; 7	GBR (NC)	HUN; 9	SWE; 4	FIN; NC	BEL	GER; 5	POL; 6	CZE; 10		6th	72

==== Supercar ====
Year	Entrant	Car	No.	Driver	1	2	3	4	5	6	7	8	9	10	ERX	Points
2011	Olsbergs MSE	Ford Fiesta T16	6	(Sweden) Andréas Eriksson	GBR; 9	POR; 2	FRA; 10	NOR (11)	SWE; 5	BEL	NED	AUT	POL	CZE	12th	44
2013	Olsbergs MSE	Ford Fiesta ST	18	(Sweden) Patrick Sandell	GBR	POR	HUN	FIN	NOR	SWE; 9	FRA	AUT	GER		22nd	14
2013	Olsbergs MSE	Ford Fiesta ST	34	(United States) Tanner Foust	GBR; 1	POR	HUN	FIN; 1	NOR	SWE	FRA; 6	AUT	GER		9th	68
2013	Olsbergs MSE	Ford Fiesta ST	38	(United States) Brian Deegan	GBR	POR	HUN	FIN; 13	NOR	SWE	FRA	AUT	GER		37th	4
2013	Olsbergs MSE	Ford Fiesta ST	57	(Finland) Toomas Heikkinen	GBR	POR	HUN	FIN; 7	NOR	SWE	FRA	AUT	GER		18th	18
2013	Olsbergs MSE	Ford Fiesta ST	63	(Sweden) Mikael Thiman	GBR	POR	HUN	FIN	NOR	SWE; 13	FRA	AUT	GER		39th	4
2014	Olsbergs MSE	Ford Fiesta ST	73	(Norway) Daniel Holten	GBR	NOR; 2	BEL	GER	ITA						17th	15
2014	Olsbergs MSE	Ford Fiesta ST	77	(United Kingdom) Andrew Jordan	GBR; 4	NOR	BEL	GER	ITA						19th	13
2014	Olsbergs MSE	Ford Fiesta ST	111	(Sweden) Richard Göransson	GBR	NOR	BEL	GER	ITA; 4						19th	13
2014	Olsbergs MSE	Ford Fiesta ST	125	(Italy) Gigi Galli	GBR	NOR	BEL	GER	ITA; 5						22nd	12

=== Complete FIA World Rallycross Championship results ===
(key)

==== Supercar ====
Year	Entrant	Car	No.	Driver	1	2	3	4	5	6	7	8	9	10	11	12	13	WRX	Points	Teams	Points
2014	Ford Olsbergs MSE	Ford Fiesta ST	13	(Norway) Andreas Bakkerud	POR; 2	GBR; 1	NOR; 11	FIN; 2	SWE; 2	BEL; 29	CAN; 8	FRA; 9	GER; 11	ITA; 6	TUR; 1	ARG; 6		5th	193	1st	409
2014	Ford Olsbergs MSE	Ford Fiesta ST	15	(Latvia) Reinis Nitišs	POR; 3	GBR; 7	NOR; 1	FIN; 3	SWE; 4	BEL; 8	CAN; 4	FRA; 2	GER; 16	ITA; 11	TUR; 7	ARG; 2		3rd	210	1st	409
2014	Ford Olsbergs MSE	Ford Fiesta ST	73	(Norway) Daniel Holten	POR	GBR	NOR; 9	FIN	SWE; 9	BEL	CAN	FRA	GER	ITA	TUR	ARG		20th	22	N/A	N/A
2014	Ford Olsbergs MSE	Ford Fiesta ST	77	(United Kingdom) Andrew Jordan	POR	GBR; 3	NOR	FIN	SWE	BEL	CAN	FRA	GER	ITA	TUR	ARG		25th	17	N/A	N/A
2014	Ford Olsbergs MSE	Ford Fiesta ST	93	(Sweden) Sebastian Eriksson	POR	GBR	NOR	FIN	SWE; 6	BEL	CAN	FRA	GER	ITA	TUR	ARG		22nd	20	N/A	N/A
2014	Ford Olsbergs MSE	Ford Fiesta ST	94	(Finland) Joni Wiman	POR	GBR	NOR	FIN	SWE	BEL	CAN; 9	FRA	GER	ITA	TUR	ARG		30th	13	N/A	N/A
2014	Ford Olsbergs MSE	Ford Fiesta ST	111	(Sweden) Richard Göransson	POR	GBR	NOR	FIN	SWE	BEL	CAN	FRA	GER	ITA; 2	TUR; 9	ARG		19th	26	N/A	N/A
2014	Ford Olsbergs MSE	Ford Fiesta ST	125	(Italy) Gigi Galli	POR	GBR	NOR	FIN	SWE	BEL	CAN	FRA	GER	ITA; 12	TUR	ARG		34th	9	N/A	N/A
2014	Ford Olsbergs MSE	Ford Fiesta ST	196	(Sweden) Kevin Eriksson	POR	GBR	NOR	FIN	SWE	BEL	CAN	FRA	GER	ITA	TUR	ARG; 3		22nd	20	N/A	N/A
2015	Olsbergs MSE	Ford Fiesta ST	13	(Norway) Andreas Bakkerud	POR; 4	HOC; 6	BEL; 5	GBR; 4	GER; 6	SWE; 3	CAN; 5	NOR; 11	FRA; 8	BAR; 10	TUR; 2	ITA; 1	ARG; 7	4th	232	2nd	399
2015	Olsbergs MSE	Ford Fiesta ST	15	(Latvia) Reinis Nitišs	POR; 11	HOC; 2	BEL; 3	GBR; 5	GER; 7	SWE; 5	CAN; 9	NOR; 9	FRA; 16	BAR; 9	TUR; 7	ITA; 9	ARG; 14	7th	167	2nd	399
2015	Olsbergs MSE	Ford Fiesta ST	88	(Norway) Henning Solberg	POR	HOC	BEL	GBR	GER	SWE	CAN	NOR; 13	FRA	BAR	TUR	ITA	ARG	25th	12	N/A	N/A
2015	Olsbergs MSE	Ford Fiesta ST	98	(Sweden) Kevin Hansen	POR	HOC	BEL	GBR	GER	SWE	CAN	NOR	FRA	BAR	TUR	ITA	ARG; 5	22nd	16	N/A	N/A
2015	Namus OMSE	Ford Fiesta ST	42	(Russia) Timur Timerzyanov	POR; 10	HOC; 15	BEL; 13	GBR; 18	GER; 11	SWE; 7	CAN; 13	NOR; 6	FRA; 10	BAR; 11	TUR; 9	ITA; 6	ARG; 17	10th	105	N/A	N/A
2016	Olsbergs MSE	Ford Fiesta ST	15	(Latvia) Reinis Nitišs	POR	HOC	BEL	GBR	NOR	SWE	CAN	FRA	BAR; 13	LAT; 11	GER	ARG; 10		16th	44	6th	132
2016	Olsbergs MSE	Ford Fiesta ST	29	(France) Yann Le Jossec	POR	HOC	BEL	GBR	NOR	SWE	CAN	FRA; 22	BAR	LAT	GER	ARG		40th	0	6th	132
2016	Olsbergs MSE	Ford Fiesta ST	68	(Finland) Niclas Grönholm	POR; 17	HOC; 14	BEL; 15	GBR; 16	NOR; 16	SWE; 11	CAN; 12	FRA; 14	BAR; 15	LAT; 18	GER	ARG		17th	28	6th	132
2016	Olsbergs MSE	Ford Fiesta ST	96	(Sweden) Kevin Eriksson	POR; 7	HOC; 11	BEL; 10	GBR; 8	NOR; 13	SWE; 15	CAN; 11	FRA	BAR; 11	LAT; 13	GER; 1	ARG; 18		11th	92	6th	132
2016	Olsbergs MSE	Ford Fiesta ST	23	(Sweden) Richard Göransson	POR	HOC	BEL	GBR	NOR	SWE; 17	CAN	FRA	BAR	LAT	GER	ARG		26th	0	N/A	N/A
2016	Olsbergs MSE	Ford Fiesta ST	113	(France) Cyril Raymond	POR	HOC	BEL	GBR	NOR	SWE	CAN	FRA	BAR	LAT	GER; 17	ARG		28th	0	N/A	N/A
2017	Olsbergs MSE	Ford Fiesta ST	59	(South Africa) Ashley Haigh-Smith	BAR	POR	HOC	BEL	GBR	NOR	SWE	CAN	FRA	LAT	GER	RSA; 21		37th	0	N/A	N/A
2017	Olsbergs MSE	Ford Fiesta ST	93	(Sweden) Sebastian Eriksson	BAR	POR	HOC	BEL	GBR	NOR	SWE; 12	CAN	FRA	LAT	GER; 13	RSA		18th	12	N/A	N/A
2017	Olsbergs MSE	Ford Fiesta ST	98	(Sweden) Oliver Eriksson	BAR	POR	HOC	BEL	GBR	NOR	SWE; 17	CAN	FRA	LAT	GER	RSA; 16		24th	1	N/A	N/A
2018	Olsbergs MSE	Ford Fiesta ST	4	(Sweden) Robin Larsson	BAR; 9	POR; 13	BEL; 7	GBR; 11	NOR; 10	SWE; 12	CAN; 12	FRA; 17	LAT; 17	USA; 14	GER; 12	RSA; 15		15th	34	6th	72
2018	Olsbergs MSE	Ford Fiesta ST	96	(Sweden) Kevin Eriksson	BAR; 14	POR; 9	BEL; 16	GBR; 9	NOR; 9	SWE; 13	CAN; 10	FRA; 10	LAT; 16	USA; 10	GER; 10	RSA; 14		13th	38	6th	72

^{*} Season still in progress.

==== RX Lites Cup ====
Year	Entrant	Car	No.	Driver	1	2	3	4	5	6	7	Lites	Points
2014	Olsbergs MSE	Lites "Ford Fiesta"	11	(Sweden) Sebastian Eriksson	POR; 1	GBR; 5	FIN	SWE	ITA	TUR; 1		5th	82
2014	Olsbergs MSE	Lites "Ford Fiesta"	13	(Norway) Daniel Holten	POR; 5	GBR; 8	FIN; 5	SWE	ITA; 1	TUR; 5		3rd	97
2014	Olsbergs MSE	Lites "Ford Fiesta"	53	(Sweden) Richard Göransson	POR; 3	GBR; 2	FIN	SWE; 3	ITA	TUR		6th	73
2015	Olsbergs MSE	Lites "Ford Fiesta"	6	(United Kingdom) Tom Onslow-Cole	POR	GBR	SWE	NOR	BAR	TUR; 3	ITA	14th	22
2015	Olsbergs MSE	Lites "Ford Fiesta"	39	(Sweden) Kevin Eriksson	POR; 1	GBR; 2	SWE; 3	NOR; 3	BAR; 4	TUR; 5	ITA; 1	2nd	166
2015	Olsbergs MSE	Lites "Ford Fiesta"	51	(Sweden) Sandra Hultgren	POR; 6	GBR; 7	SWE; 10	NOR; 6	BAR	TUR	ITA	10th	55
2015	Olsbergs MSE	Lites "Ford Fiesta"	77	(France) Cyril Raymond	POR	GBR	SWE	NOR	BAR; 2	TUR	ITA	13th	26
2015	Olsbergs MSE	Lites "Ford Fiesta"	78	(United States) Austin Cindric	POR	GBR	SWE	NOR	BAR	TUR	ITA; 10	19th	12
2015	Olsbergs MSE	Lites "Ford Fiesta"	89	(Sweden) Andreas Wernersson	POR	GBR	SWE; 4	NOR	BAR	TUR	ITA	14th	22
2015	Olsbergs MSE	Lites "Ford Fiesta"	98	(Sweden) Oliver Eriksson	POR; 7	GBR; 4	SWE	NOR; 8	BAR	TUR	ITA; 4	7th	66
2016	Olsbergs MSE	Lites "Ford Fiesta"	13	(France) Cyril Raymond	HOC; 2	BEL; 6	GBR; 1	NOR; 2	SWE; 2	BAR; 1	LAT; 8	1st	175
2016	Olsbergs MSE	Lites "Ford Fiesta"	21	(Sweden) Marcus Höglund	HOC	BEL	GBR	NOR	SWE; 6	BAR	LAT	12th	19
2016	Olsbergs MSE	Lites "Ford Fiesta"	33	(Kenya) Tejas Hirani	HOC; 8	BEL; 7	GBR; 7	NOR; 5	SWE; 16	BAR; 6	LAT; 3	7th	96
2016	Olsbergs MSE	Lites "Ford Fiesta"	40	(United Kingdom) Dan Rooke	HOC	BEL	GBR; 8	NOR	SWE	BAR	LAT	18th	13
2016	Olsbergs MSE	Lites "Ford Fiesta"	64	(United Arab Emirates) Saeed Bintouq	HOC	BEL	GBR; 10	NOR; 7	SWE	BAR; 10	LAT	10th	33
2016	Olsbergs MSE	Lites "Ford Fiesta"	75	(Germany) Patrick Simon	HOC; 5	BEL	GBR	NOR	SWE	BAR	LAT	11th	21

==== RX2 International Series ====
Year	Entrant	Car	No.	Driver	1	2	3	4	5	6	7	RX2	Points
2017	Olsbergs MSE	RX2	11	(United States) Tanner Whitten	BEL; 3	GBR; 7	NOR; 2	SWE; 16	CAN; 3	FRA; 15	RSA; 3	4th	105
2017	Olsbergs MSE	RX2	13	(France) Cyril Raymond	BEL; 1	GBR; 1	NOR; 1	SWE; 6	CAN; 1	FRA; 1	RSA; 1	1st	198
2017	Olsbergs MSE	RX2	19	(Sweden) Andreas Bäckman	BEL; 15	GBR; 14	NOR; 5	SWE; 4	CAN; 9	FRA; 12	RSA; 8	10th	69
2017	Olsbergs MSE	RX2	26	(Sweden) Jessica Bäckman	BEL; 16	GBR; 13	NOR; 14	SWE; 22	CAN; 10	FRA; 14	RSA; 16	15th	21
2017	Olsbergs MSE	RX2	33	(Kenya) Tejas Hirani	BEL; 12	GBR	NOR	SWE	CAN	FRA	RSA	19th	8
2017	Olsbergs MSE	RX2	36	(France) Guerlain Chicherit	BEL	GBR	NOR	SWE	CAN; 15	FRA	RSA; 12	20th	8
2017	Olsbergs MSE	RX2	53	(United States) Cole Keatts	BEL	GBR	NOR	SWE	CAN; 12	FRA	RSA	21st	7
2018	Olsbergs MSE	RX2	16	(Sweden) Oliver Eriksson	BEL; 7	GBR; 1	NOR; 2	SWE; 4	CAN; 1	FRA	RSA	1st*	125*
2018	Olsbergs MSE	RX2	18	(Sweden) Linus Östlund	BEL	GBR	NOR	SWE; 13	CAN	FRA	RSA	21st*	4*
2018	Olsbergs MSE	RX2	53	(United States) Cole Keatts	BEL; 16	GBR; 14	NOR; 16	SWE; 27	CAN; 3	FRA	RSA	16th*	20*
2018	Olsbergs MSE	RX2	96	(Belgium) Guillaume De Ridder	BEL; 8	GBR; 7	NOR; 1	SWE; 1	CAN; 2	FRA	RSA	2nd*	114*

^{*} Season still in progress.

=== Complete Global Rallycross results ===
(key)

==== AWD ====
Year	Entrant	Car	No	Driver	1	2	3	4	5	6	7	8	GRC	Points
2011	Best Buy Olsbergs MSE	Ford Fiesta T16	3	(Finland) Marcus Grönholm	IRW1; 1	IRW2; 1			PIK1; 2	PIK2; 1	LA1; 2	LA2; 3	2nd	112
2011	Best Buy Olsbergs MSE	Ford Fiesta T16	3	(Sweden) Andréas Eriksson			SEA1; 1	SEA2; 3					12th	37
2011	Rockstar Etnies Olsbergs MSE	Ford Fiesta T16	34	(United States) Tanner Foust	IRW1; 3	IRW2; 2	SEA1; 2	SEA2; 1	PIK1; 1	PIK2; 6	LA1; 4	LA2; 2	1st	134
2011	Rockstar Metal Mulisha Olsbergs MSE	Ford Fiesta T16	38	(United States) Brian Deegan	IRW1	IRW2	SEA1	SEA2	PIK1; 3	PIK2; 8	LA1; 10	LA2; 1	9th	54
2011	Westmatic Olsbergs MSE	Ford Fiesta T16	99	(Sweden) Pontus Tidemand	IRW1; 4	IRW2; 5	SEA1	SEA2	PIK1	PIK2	LA1	LA2	15th	25

==== Supercar ====
Year	Entrant	Car	No	Driver	1	2	3	4	5	6	7	8	9	10	11	12	GRC	Points
2012	Best Buy Mobile Olsbergs MSE	Ford Fiesta T16	3	(Finland) Marcus Grönholm	CHA; 1	TEX; 1	LA	LOU	LV	LVC							7th	43
2012	Best Buy Mobile Olsbergs MSE	Ford Fiesta T16	3	(Sweden) Andréas Eriksson	CHA	TEX	LA	LOU	LV; 9	LVC							21st	8
2012	Best Buy Mobile Olsbergs MSE	Ford Fiesta T16	3	(Russia) Timur Timerzyanov	CHA	TEX	LA	LOU	LV	LVC; 9							20th	8
2012	Best Buy Serve Olsbergs MSE	Ford Fiesta T16	17	(United Kingdom) David Binks	CHA; 7	TEX; 5	LA; 8	LOU; 8	LV; 13	LVC; DNS							8th	42
2012	Rockstar Etnies Olsbergs MSE	Ford Fiesta T16	34	(United States) Tanner Foust	CHA; 2	TEX; 2	LA; 6	LOU; 4	LV; 1	LVC; 1							1st	94
2012	Rockstar Metal Mulisha Olsbergs MSE	Ford Fiesta T16	38	(United States) Brian Deegan	CHA; 16	TEX; 3	LA; 3	LOU; 3	LV; 2	LVC; 2							2nd	84
2012	Bluebeam Olsbergs MSE	Ford Fiesta T16	57	(Finland) Toomas Heikkinen	CHA; 10	TEX; 18	LA	LOU	LV; 4	LVC; 5							14th	33
2013	Kobalt Tools Olsbergs MSE	Ford Fiesta ST	18	(Sweden) Patrik Sandell	BRA; 3	MUN1; 8	MUN2; 13	LOU; 2	BRI; 5	IRW; 8	ATL; 11	CHA; 13	LV; 7				6th	89
2013	Rockstar Energy Olsbergs MSE	Ford Fiesta ST	34	(United States) Tanner Foust	BRA; 8	MUN1; 6	MUN2; 3	LOU; 4	BRI; 7	IRW; 2	ATL; 2	CHA; 10	LV; 2				2nd	123
2013	Rockstar Energy Metal Mulisha Olsbergs MSE	Ford Fiesta ST	38	(United States) Brian Deegan	BRA; 5	MUN1; 7	MUN2; 9	LOU; 3	BRI; 3	IRW; 7	ATL; 6	CHA; 2	LV; 13				4th	106
2013	Bluebeam Olsbergs MSE	Ford Fiesta ST	57	(Finland) Toomas Heikkinen	BRA; 2	MUN1; 3	MUN2; 1	LOU; 1	BRI; 5	IRW; 8	ATL; 11	CHA; 3	LV; 4				1st	169
2013	Royal Purple OMSE2	Ford Fiesta ST	7	(United States) Townsend Bell	BRA	MUN1; 12	MUN2; 6	LOU	BRI	IRW	ATL	CHA	LV				20th	16
2013	Royal Purple OMSE2	Ford Fiesta ST	32	(Canada) Steve Arpin	BRA; 4	MUN1; 11	MUN2; 5	LOU; 12	BRI; 6	IRW; 14	ATL; 9	CHA; 5	LV; 8				8th	79
2013	Rdio OMSE2	Ford Fiesta ST	77	(United States) Scott Speed	BRA; 1	MUN1; 9	MUN2; 15	LOU; 9	BRI; 13	IRW; 9	ATL; 7	CHA; 1	LV; 9				5th	94
2014	Red Bull Olsbergs MSE	Ford Fiesta ST	31	(Finland) Joni Wiman	BAR; 5	AUS; 17	DC; 3	NY; 4	CHA; 4	DAY; 7	LA1; 2	LA2; 3	SEA; 2	LV; 2			1st	381
2014	Red Bull Olsbergs MSE	Ford Fiesta ST	48	(United States) Ricky Johnson	BAR	AUS; 9	DC	NY	CHA	DAY	LA1	LA2	SEA	LV			-	0
2014	Kobalt Tools Olsbergs MSE	Ford Fiesta ST	18	(Sweden) Patrik Sandell	BAR; 8	AUS; 6	DC; 1	NY; 10	CHA; 13	DAY; 4	LA1; 5	LA2; 7	SEA; 7	LV; 10			6th	246
2014	OMSE2	Ford Fiesta ST	00	(Canada) Steve Arpin	BAR; 2	AUS; 10	DC; 4	NY; 5	CHA; 7	DAY; 12	LA1; 7	LA2; 12	SEA; 11	LV; 8			7th	224
2015	Red Bull Olsbergs MSE	Ford Fiesta ST	31	(Finland) Joni Wiman	FTA; 12	DAY1; 4	DAY2; 8	MCAS; 8	DET1; 5	DET2; 4	DC; 10	LA1; 9	LA2; 8	BAR1; 3	BAR2; 5	LV; 1	5th	370
2015	Red Bull Olsbergs MSE	Ford Fiesta ST	93	(Sweden) Sebastian Eriksson	FTA; 4	DAY1; 3	DAY2; 1	MCAS; 9	DET1; 3	DET2; 3	DC; 6	LA1; 13	LA2; 7	BAR1; 4	BAR2; 7	LV; 2	2nd	400
2016	Honda Red Bull OMSE	Honda Civic Coupe	31	(Finland) Joni Wiman	PHO1; 6	PHO2; 10	DAL; 5	DAY1; 4	DAY2; 4	MCAS1; 7	MCAS2; C	DC; 5	AC; 12	SEA; 3	LA1; 11	LA2; 5	6th	342
2016	Honda Red Bull OMSE	Honda Civic Coupe	93	(Sweden) Sebastian Eriksson	PHO1; 9	PHO2; 3	DAL; 10	DAY1; 3	DAY2; 3	MCAS1; 6	MCAS2; C	DC; 10	AC; 6	SEA; 2	LA1; 9	LA2; 12	7th	341
2016	Honda Red Bull OMSE	Honda Civic Coupe	96	(Sweden) Kevin Eriksson	PHO1	PHO2	DAL	DAY1	DAY2	MCAS1	MCAS2; C	DC	AC; 13	SEA	LA1	LA2	18th	4
2017	Honda Red Bull OMSE	Honda Civic Coupe	16	(Sweden) Oliver Eriksson	MEM; 5	LOU; 7	THO1; 9	THO2; 8	OTT1; 8	OTT2; 5	INDY; 4	AC1; 6	AC2; 7	SEA1; 5	SEA2; 10	LA; 10	6th	601
2017	Honda Red Bull OMSE	Honda Civic Coupe	24	(United States) Mitchell DeJong	MEM; 4	LOU; 5	THO1; 3	THO2; 4	OTT1; 3	OTT2; 3	INDY; 10	AC1; 5	AC2; 5	SEA1; 9	SEA2; 8	LA; 6	5th	640
2017	Honda Red Bull OMSE	Honda Civic Coupe	93	(Sweden) Sebastian Eriksson	MEM; 7	LOU; 1	THO1; 10	THO2; 6	OTT1; 6	OTT1; 4	INDY; 6	AC1; 4	AC2; 2	SEA1; 10	SEA2; 9	LA; 7	4th	651

==== GRC Lites ====
Year	Entrant	Car	No.	Driver	1	2	3	4	5	6	7	8	9	10	11	12	Lites	Points
2013	Olsbergs MSE	Lites "Ford Fiesta"	4	(Turkey) Halid Avdagiç	LOU; 7	BRI; 8	IRW; 7	ATL	CHA	LV							9th	29
2013	Olsbergs MSE	Lites "Ford Fiesta"	15	(Latvia) Reinis Nitišs	LOU	BRI	IRW; 5	ATL; 6	CHA	LV							10th	23
2013	Olsbergs MSE	Lites "Ford Fiesta"	15	(Sweden) Eric Färén	LOU	BRI	IRW	ATL	CHA	LV; 2							12th	18
2013	Olsbergs MSE	Lites "Ford Fiesta"	24	(United States) Mitchell DeJong	LOU; 4	BRI; 9	IRW; 2	ATL; 2	CHA; 4	LV; 5							3rd	81
2013	Olsbergs MSE	Lites "Ford Fiesta"	35	(United States) Brent Lee	LOU	BRI	IRW	ATL	CHA	LV; 9							13th	8
2013	Olsbergs MSE	Lites "Ford Fiesta"	37	(Sweden) Sebastian Eriksson	LOU; 2	BRI; 5	IRW; 3	ATL; 3	CHA; 3	LV; 3							2nd	93
2013	Olsbergs MSE	Lites "Ford Fiesta"	60	(United States) Tyler Benson	LOU	BRI	IRW	ATL; 10	CHA; 9	LV; 10							11th	22
2013	Olsbergs MSE	Lites "Ford Fiesta"	65	(United States) Geoff Sykes	LOU; 8	BRI; 4	IRW; 9	ATL; 7	CHA; 2	LV; 8							7th	66
2014	Olsbergs MSE	Lites "Ford Fiesta"	13	(Norway) Andreas Bakkerud	AUS	DC	NY	CHA	DAY	LA1	LA2	SEA	LV; 2				11th	51
2014	Olsbergs MSE	Lites "Ford Fiesta"	16	(Sweden) Oliver Eriksson	AUS	DC	NY; 4	CHA; 3	DAY	LA1	LA2	SEA	LV; 6				7th	110
2014	Olsbergs MSE	Lites "Ford Fiesta"	24	(United States) Mitchell DeJong	AUS; 1	DC; 1	NY; 2	CHA; 1	DAY; 1	LA1; 2	LA2; 1	SEA; 1	LV; 1				1st	489
2014	Olsbergs MSE	Lites "Ford Fiesta"	51	(Brazil) Átila Abreu	AUS; 5	DC; 4	NY	CHA	DAY	LA1	LA2	SEA	LV				10th	72
2014	Olsbergs MSE	Lites "Ford Fiesta"	96	(Sweden) Kevin Eriksson	AUS; 2	DC; 2	NY; 1	CHA; 2	DAY	LA1; 1	LA2; 2	SEA	LV; 8				2nd	331
2014	Olsbergs MSE	Lites "Ford Fiesta"	126	(Colombia) Alejandro Fernández	AUS; 7	DC; 6	NY; 6	CHA; 4	DAY; 2	LA1; 7	LA2; 3	SEA; 3	LV; 5				3rd	206
2015	Olsbergs MSE	Lites "Ford Fiesta"	16	(Sweden) Oliver Eriksson	FTA; 3	DAY1; 1	DAY2; 10	MCAS; 2	DET1; 5	DET2; 7	DC; 6	LA1; 1	LA2; 3	BAR1; 1	BAR2; 2	LV; 3	1st	501
2015	Olsbergs MSE	Lites "Ford Fiesta"	28	(United States) Gustavo Menezes	FTA	DAY1	DAY2	MCAS	DET1	DET2	DC	LA1	LA2	BAR1	BAR2	LV; 9	20th	11
2015	Olsbergs MSE	Lites "Ford Fiesta"	51	(Sweden) Sandra Hultgren	FTA	DAY1	DAY2	MCAS	DET1	DET2	DC	LA1	LA2	BAR1	BAR2	LV; 11	22nd	2
2015	Olsbergs MSE	Lites "Ford Fiesta"	77	(United States) Austin Cindric	FTA; 1	DAY1; 9	DAY2; 1	MCAS; 5	DET1; 3	DET2; 3	DC; 8	LA1; 2	LA2; 1	BAR1; 2	BAR2; 1	LV; 10	2nd	473
2015	Olsbergs MSE	Lites "Ford Fiesta"	89	(Sweden) Andreas Wernersson	FTA	DAY1	DAY2	MCAS	DET1	DET2	DC	LA1	LA2	BAR1	BAR2	LV; 2	14th	48
2015	Olsbergs MSE	Lites "Ford Fiesta"	99	(Norway) Joachim Hvaal	FTA	DAY1	DAY2	MCAS	DET1	DET2	DC; 5	LA1	LA2	BAR1	BAR2	LV	17th	32
2016	Olsbergs MSE X Forces	Lites "Ford Fiesta"	13	(Sweden) Oliver Eriksson	PHO1; 10	PHO2; 6	DAL; 1	DAY1; 1	DAY2; 2	MCAS1; 10	MCAS2; C	DC; 2	AC; 4	SEA; 2	LA1; 8	LA2; 4	2nd	447
2016	Olsbergs MSE X Forces	Lites "Ford Fiesta"	45	(Finland) Miki Weckström	PHO1; 1	PHO2; 3	DAL; 10	DAY1; 10	DAY2; 3	MCAS1; 1	MCAS2; C	DC; 3	AC; 7	SEA; 3	LA1; 2	LA2; 9	3rd	419
2016	Olsbergs MSE X Forces	Lites "Ford Fiesta"	51	(Sweden) Sandra Hultgren	PHO1	PHO2	DAL	DAY1	DAY2	MCAS1	MCAS2; C	DC; 8	AC; 8	SEA	LA1	LA2	19th	36
2016	Olsbergs MSE X Forces	Lites "Ford Fiesta"	53	(United States) Cole Keatts	PHO1; 13	PHO2; 11	DAL; 13	DAY1; 12	DAY2; 15	MCAS1; 12	MCAS2; C	DC; 11	AC; 11	SEA; 5	LA1; 13	LA2; 12	17th	51
2017	Olsbergs MSE X Forces	Lites "Ford Fiesta"	13	(France) Cyril Raymond	MEM; 2	LOU; 9	THO1; 1	THO2; 1	OTT1; 1	OTT2; 1	INDY; 2	AC1; 1	AC2; 6	SEA1; 1	SEA2; 2	LA; 9	1st	786
2017	Olsbergs MSE X Forces	Lites "Ford Fiesta"	53	(United States) Cole Keatts	MEM; 11	LOU; 7	THO1; 6	THO2; 9	OTT1; 6	OTT2; 6	INDY; 4	AC1; 10	AC2; 10	SEA1; 4	SEA1; 6	LA; 7	7th	543
2017	Olsbergs MSE X Forces	Lites "Ford Fiesta"	77	(United States) Scott Anderson	MEM	LOU	THO1	THO2	OTT1	OTT2	INDY	AC1; 6	AC2; 7	SEA1; 7	SEA1; 5	LA; 5	11th	242
2017	Olsbergs MSE X Forces	Lites "Ford Fiesta"	242	(United States) Mark Brummond	MEM	LOU	THO1	THO2	OTT1	OTT2	INDY	AC1	AC2	SEA1; 10	SEA1; 9	LA; 6	12th	79

== Gallery ==
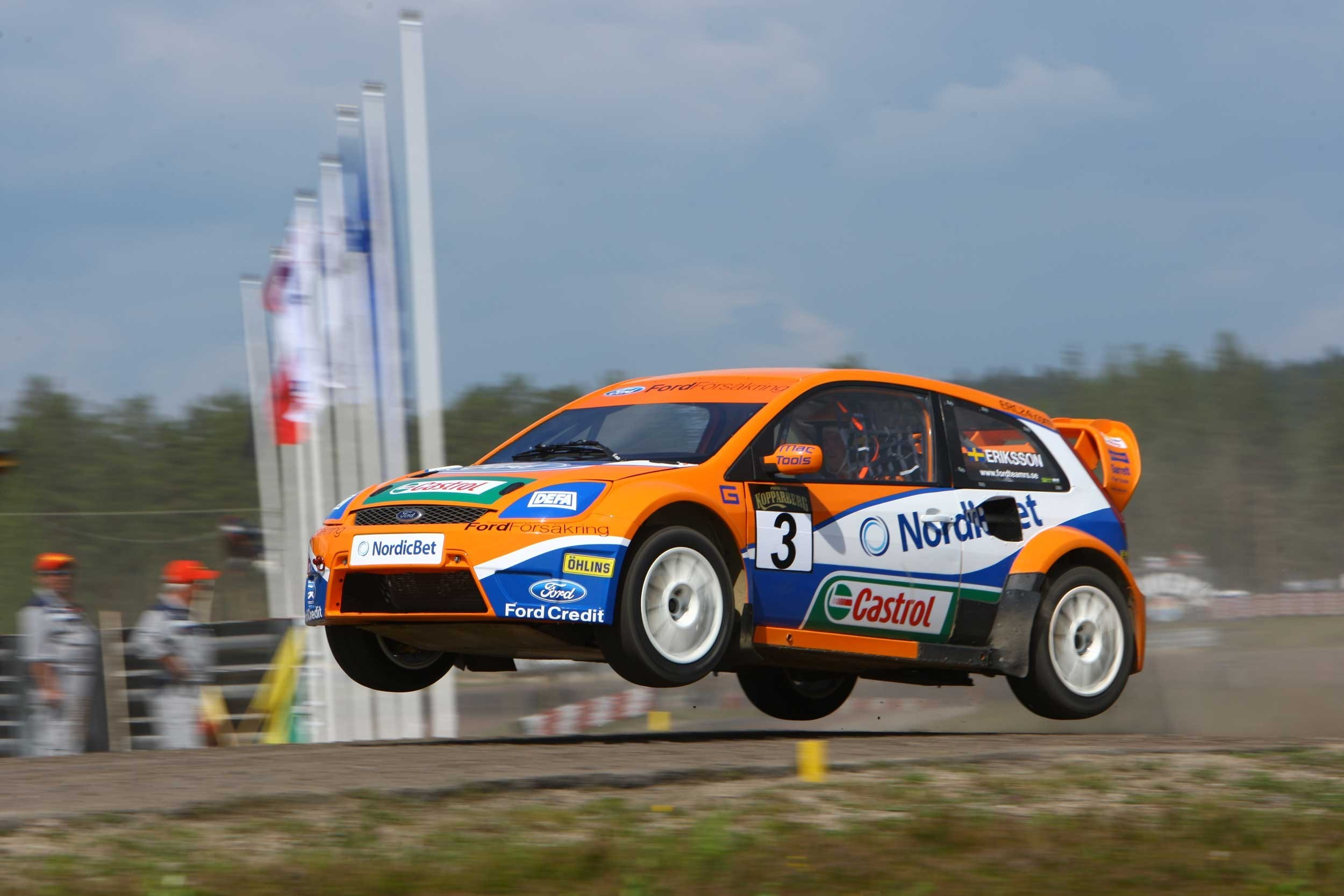
Andréas Eriksson in action during the 2008 Euro RX of Sweden

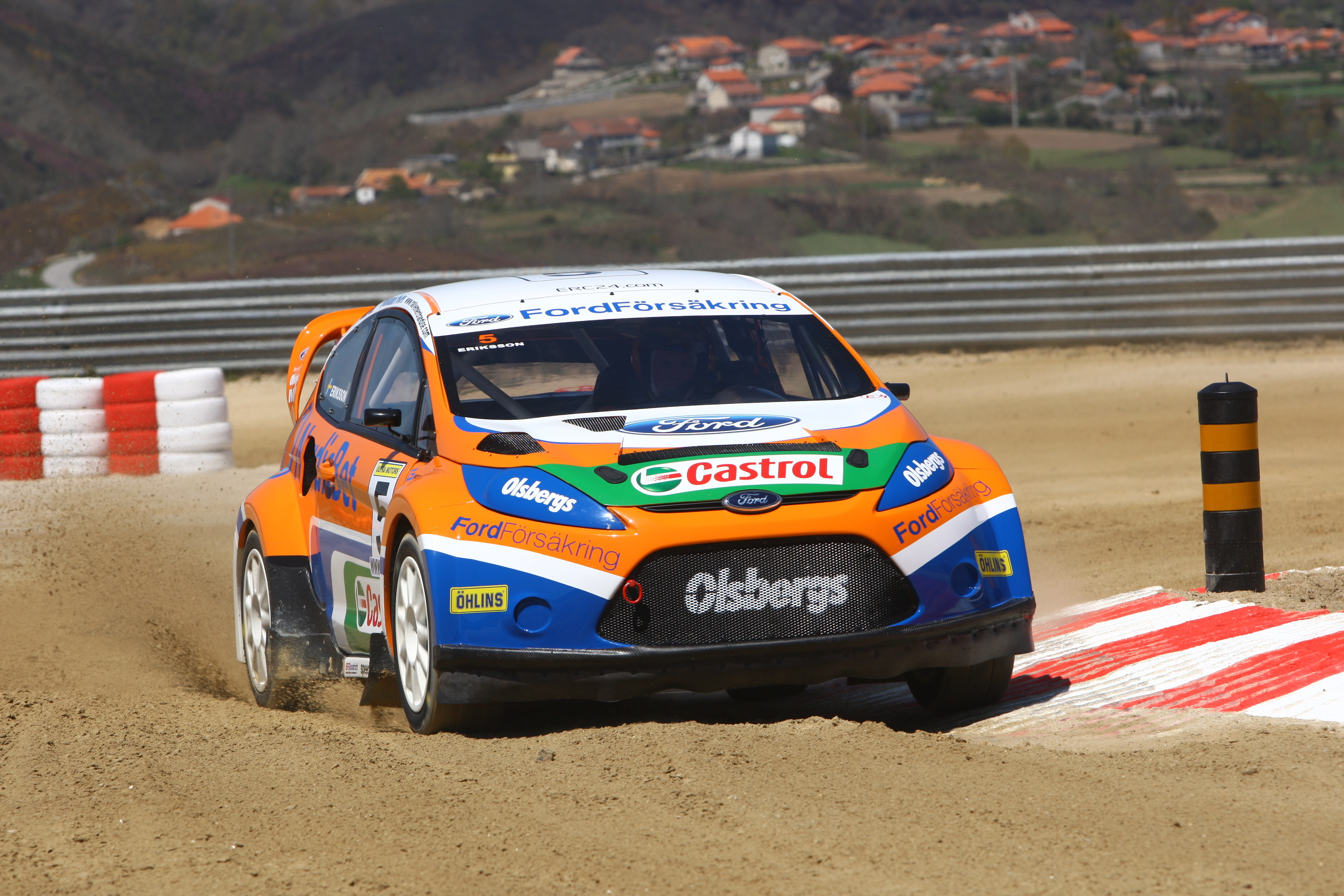
Andréas Eriksson in action during the 2009 European Rallycross Championship

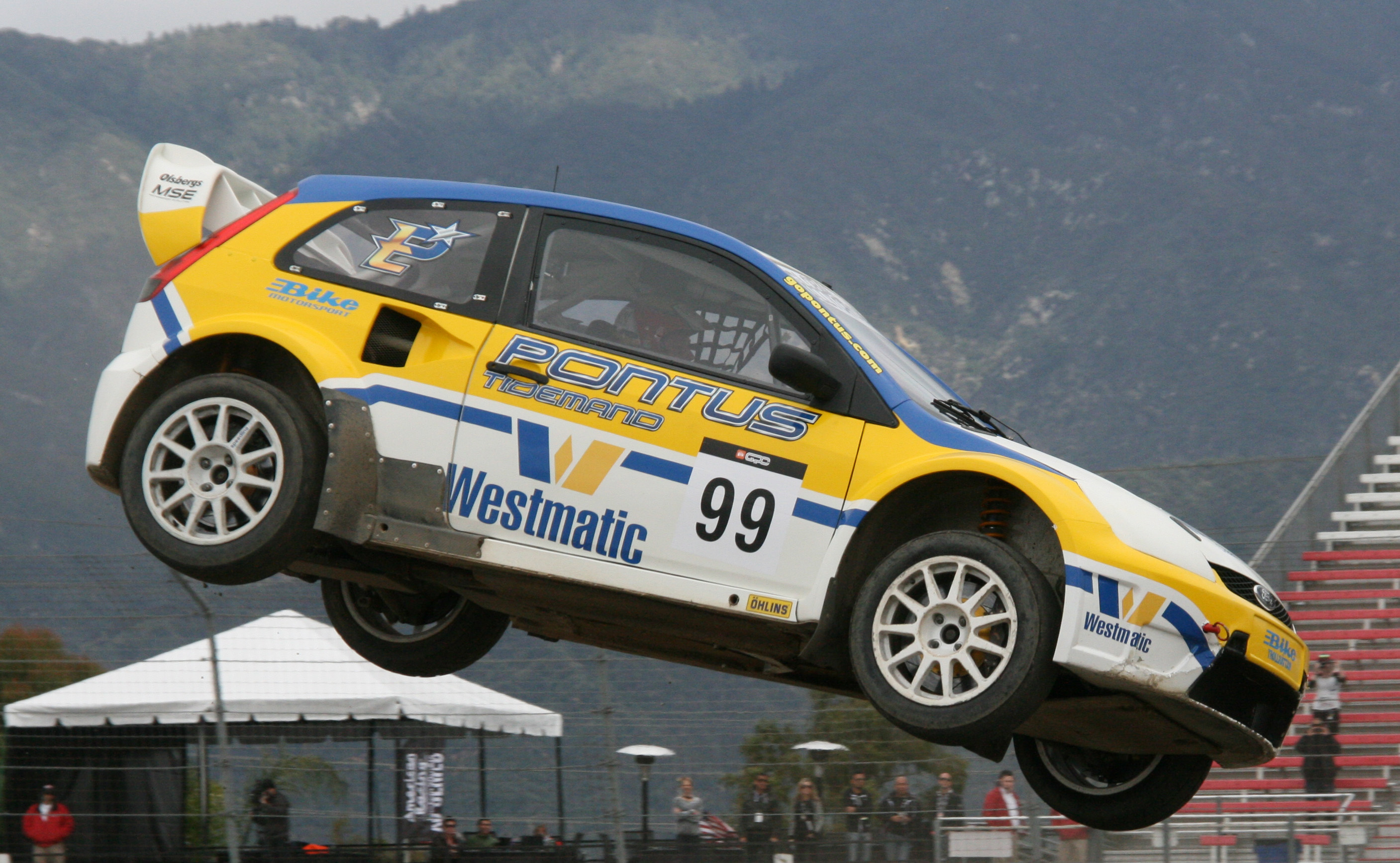
Pontus Tidemand in action during the Irwindale round of the 2011 GRC

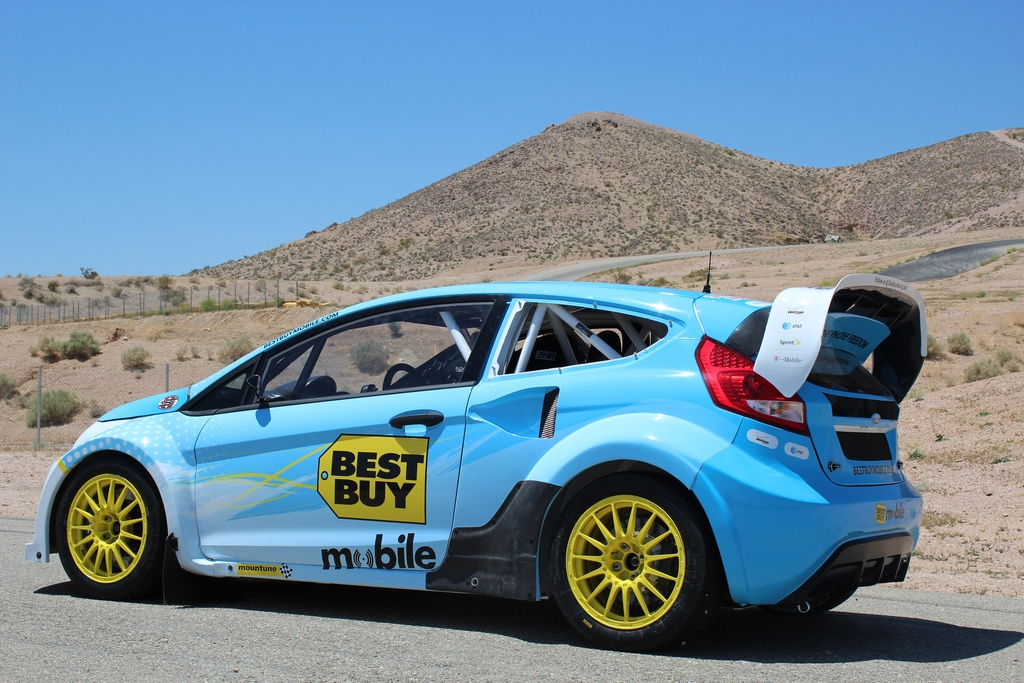
Marcus Grönholms 2012 Ford Fiesta Global RallyCross car

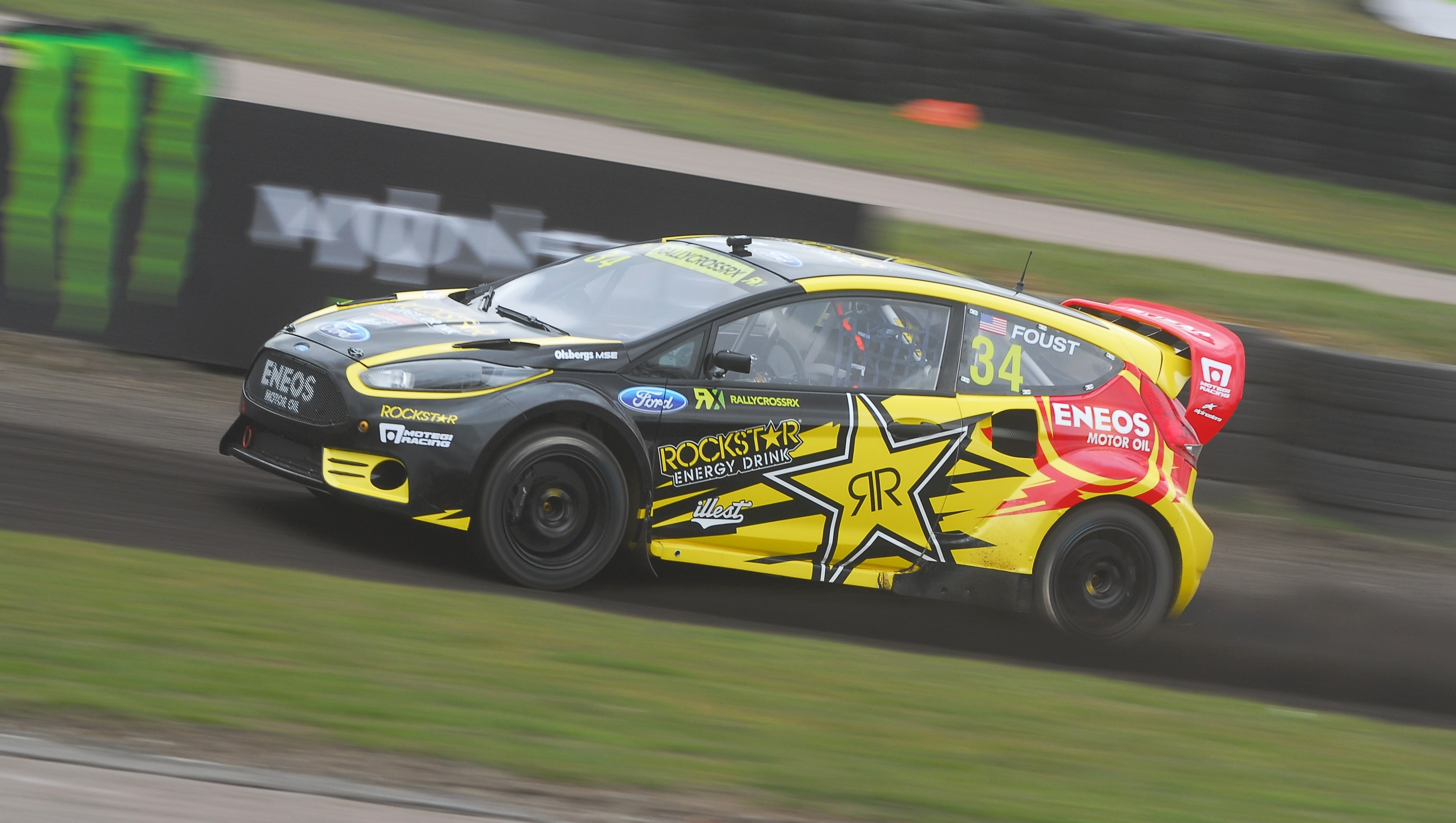
Tanner Foust in action during the 2013 Euro RX of Great Britain

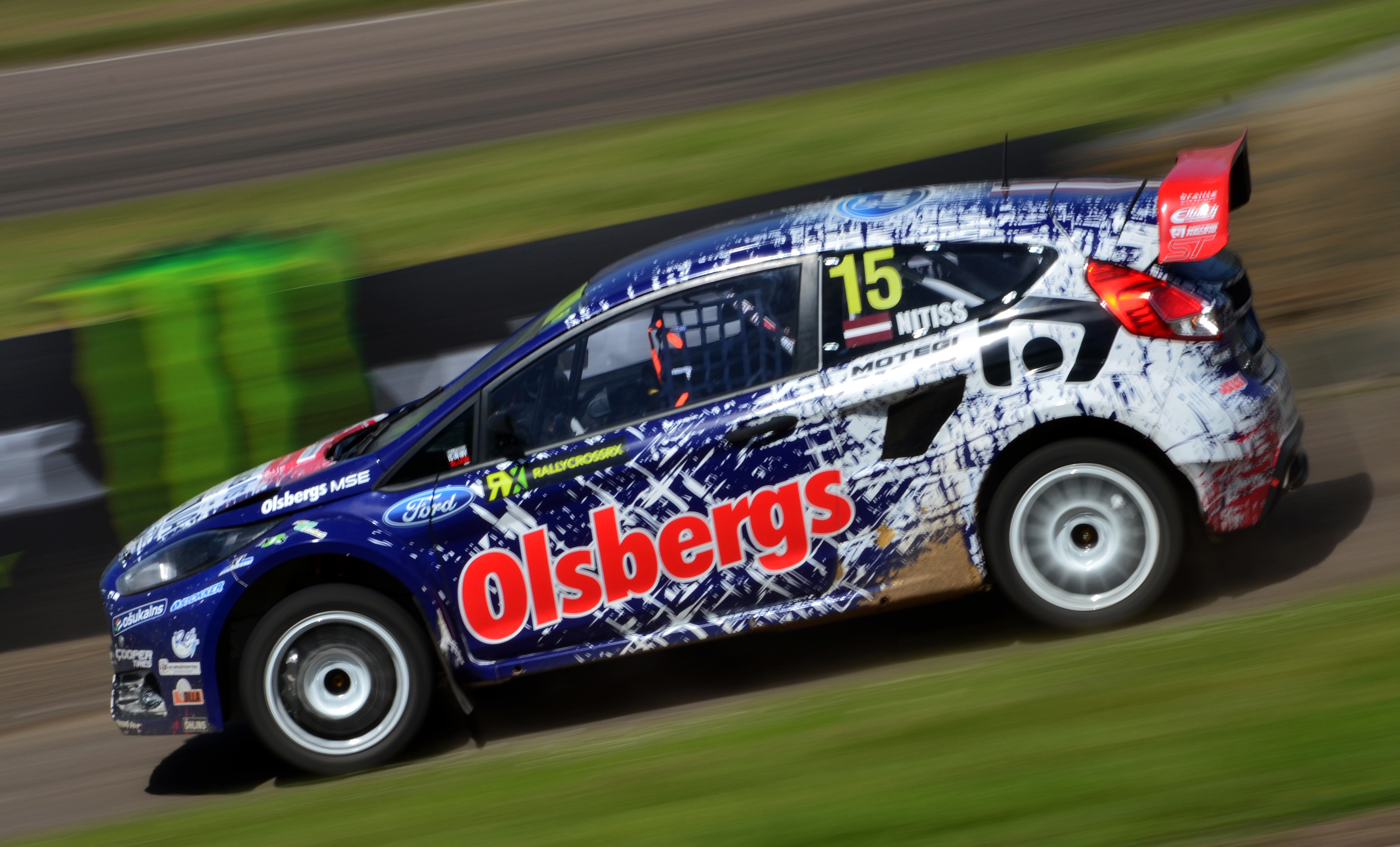
Reinis Nitišs in action during the 2014 World RX of Great Britain

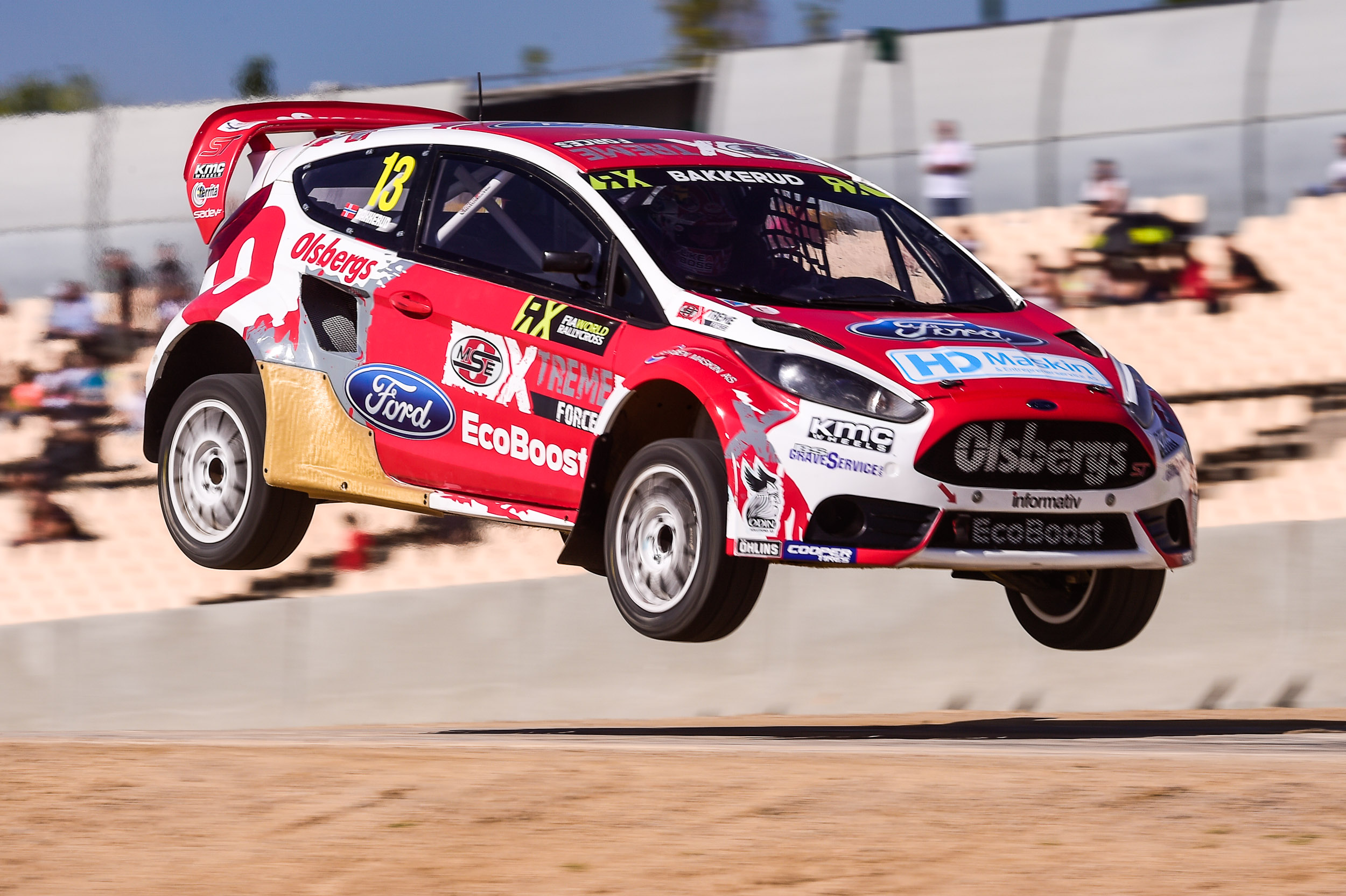
Andreas Bakkerud in action during the 2015 World RX of Barcelona

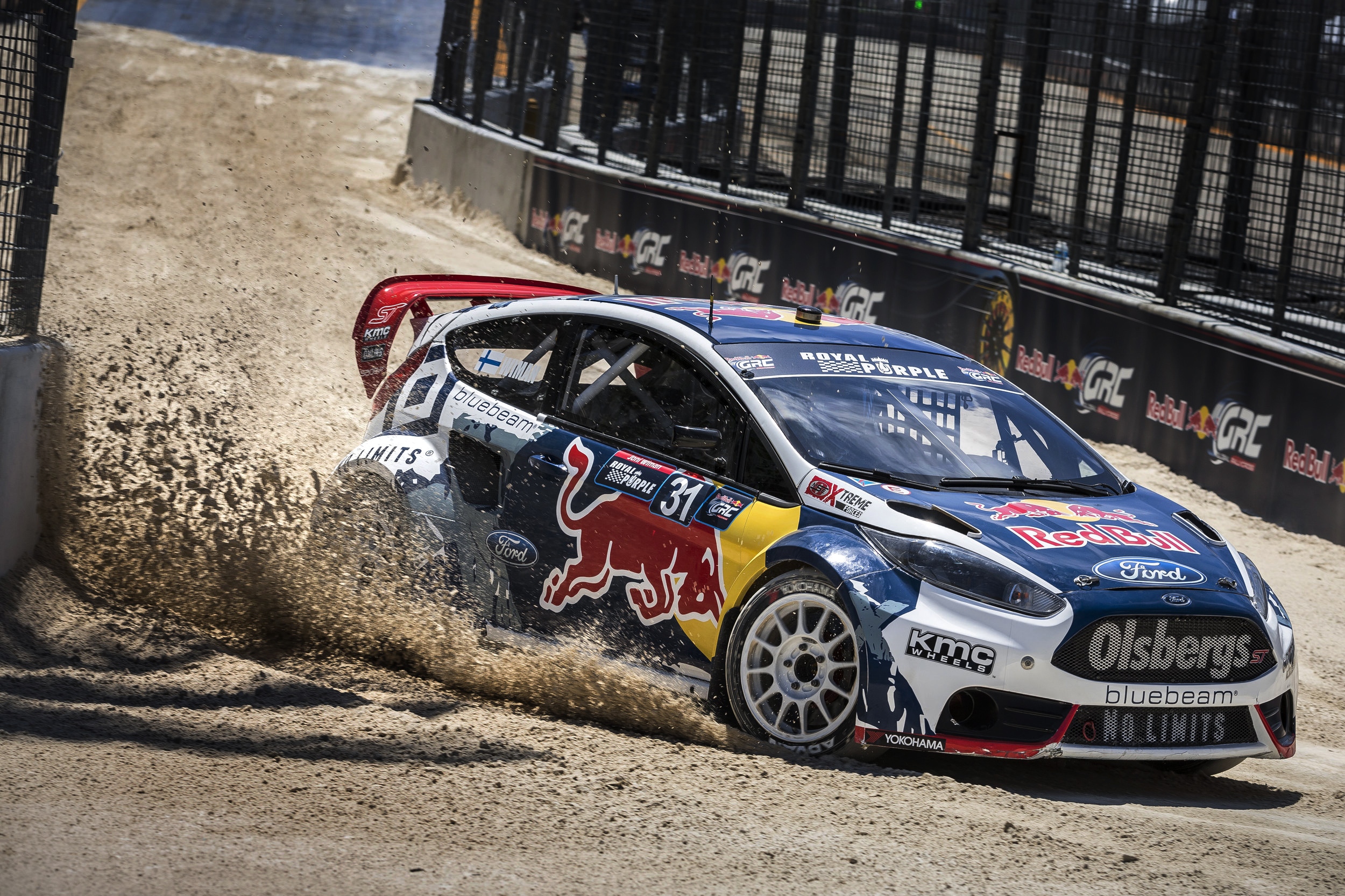
Joni Wiman in action during the Florida round of the 2015 GRC

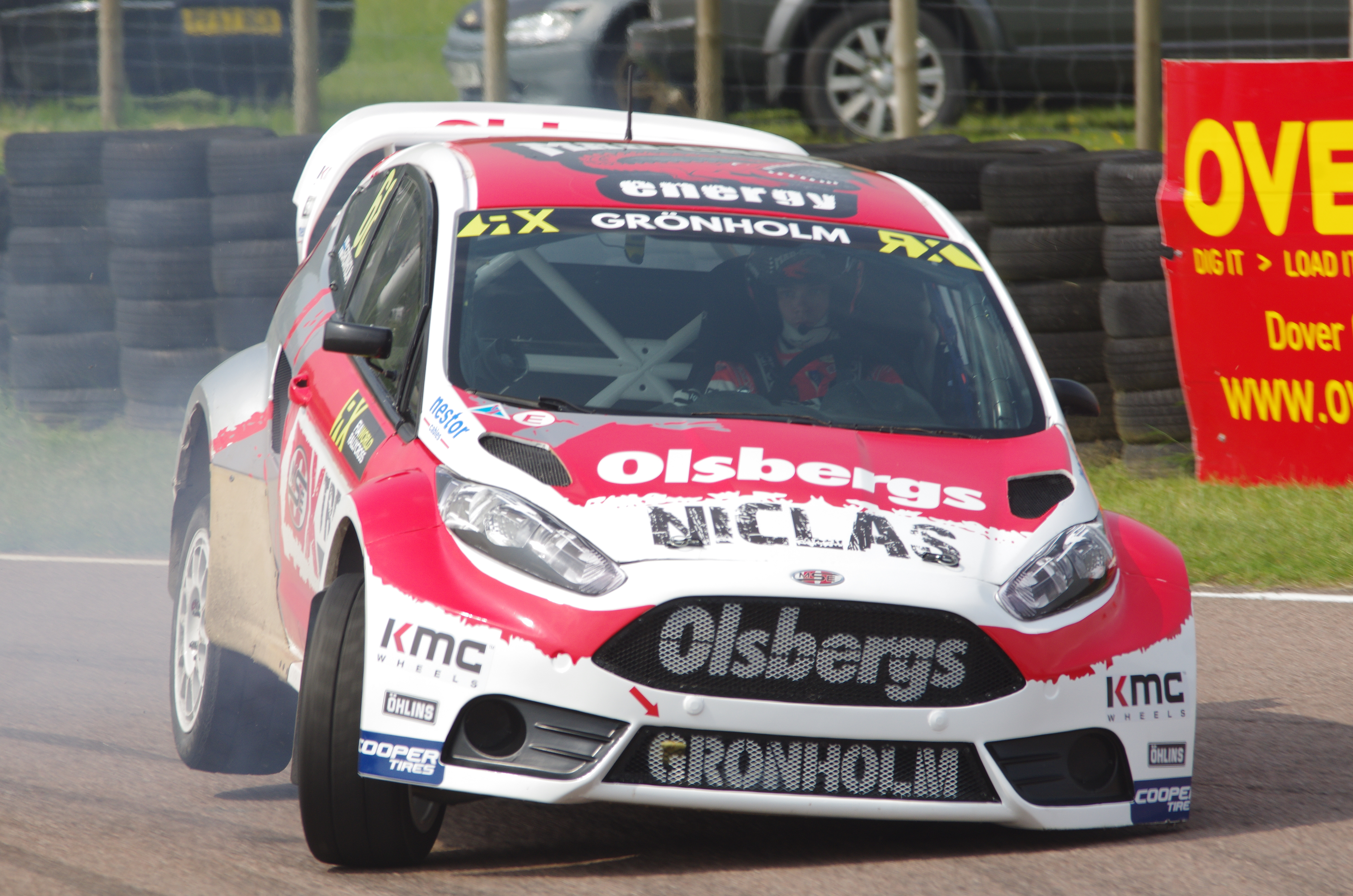
Niclas Grönholm in action during the 2016 World RX of Great Britain
