= Toomas Heikkinen =

Finnish rallycross driver

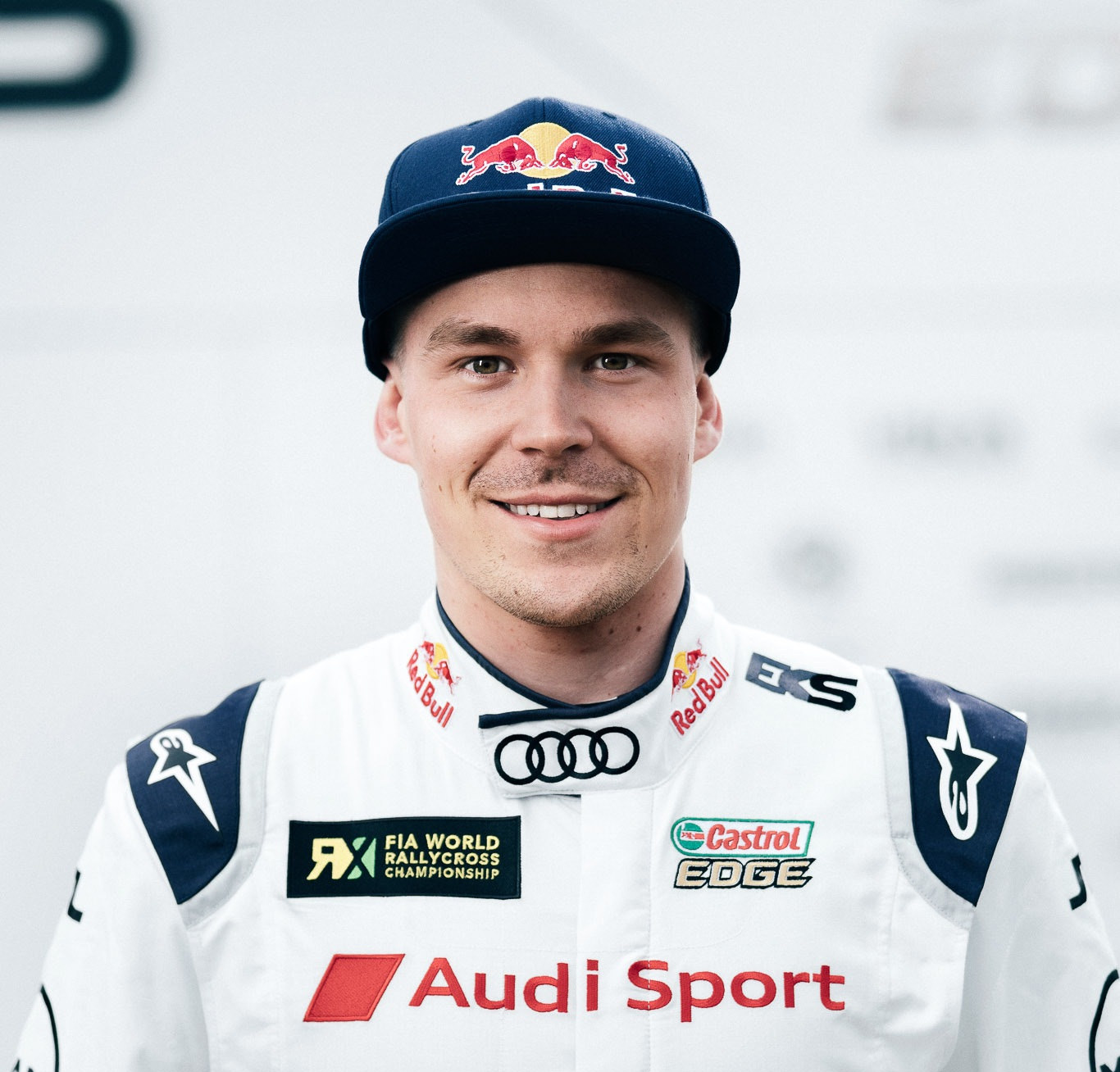
- Heikkinen in 2017
- Nationality: (Finland) Finnish
- Born: Toomas Johannes Heikkinen; 27 March 1991 (age 35) Joensuu, Finland

FIA World Rallycross Championship career
- Years active: 2014-2019
- Former teams: Marklund Motorsport; EKS RX; MJP Racing Team Austria; GRX SET
- Starts: 52
- Wins: 2
- Podiums: 8
- Best finish: 2nd in 2014
- Finished last season: 19th

FIA European Rallycross Championship
- Years active: 2010–2011, 2013
- Former teams: Olsbergs MSE; Eklund Motorsport
- Starts: 14
- Wins: 0
- Podiums: 1
- Best finish: 6th in 2011 (Supercar)

Global RallyCross Championship
- Years active: 2012–2014
- Former teams: Marklund Motorsport; Olsbergs MSE
- Starts: 14
- Championships: 1 (2013)
- Wins: 5
- Podiums: 8

Toomas Johannes "Topi" Heikkinen (born 27 March 1991) is a rallycross and ice-racing driver from Finland. He won the Finnish Rallycross Championship in 2010 and the Global Rallycross Championship in 2013. He currently competes in the FIA World Rallycross Championship Supercar category, driving for EKS racing team.

Heikkinen began his racing career in karting, later moving up to single-seater formula. He switched to rallycross in 2010.

== Racing record ==
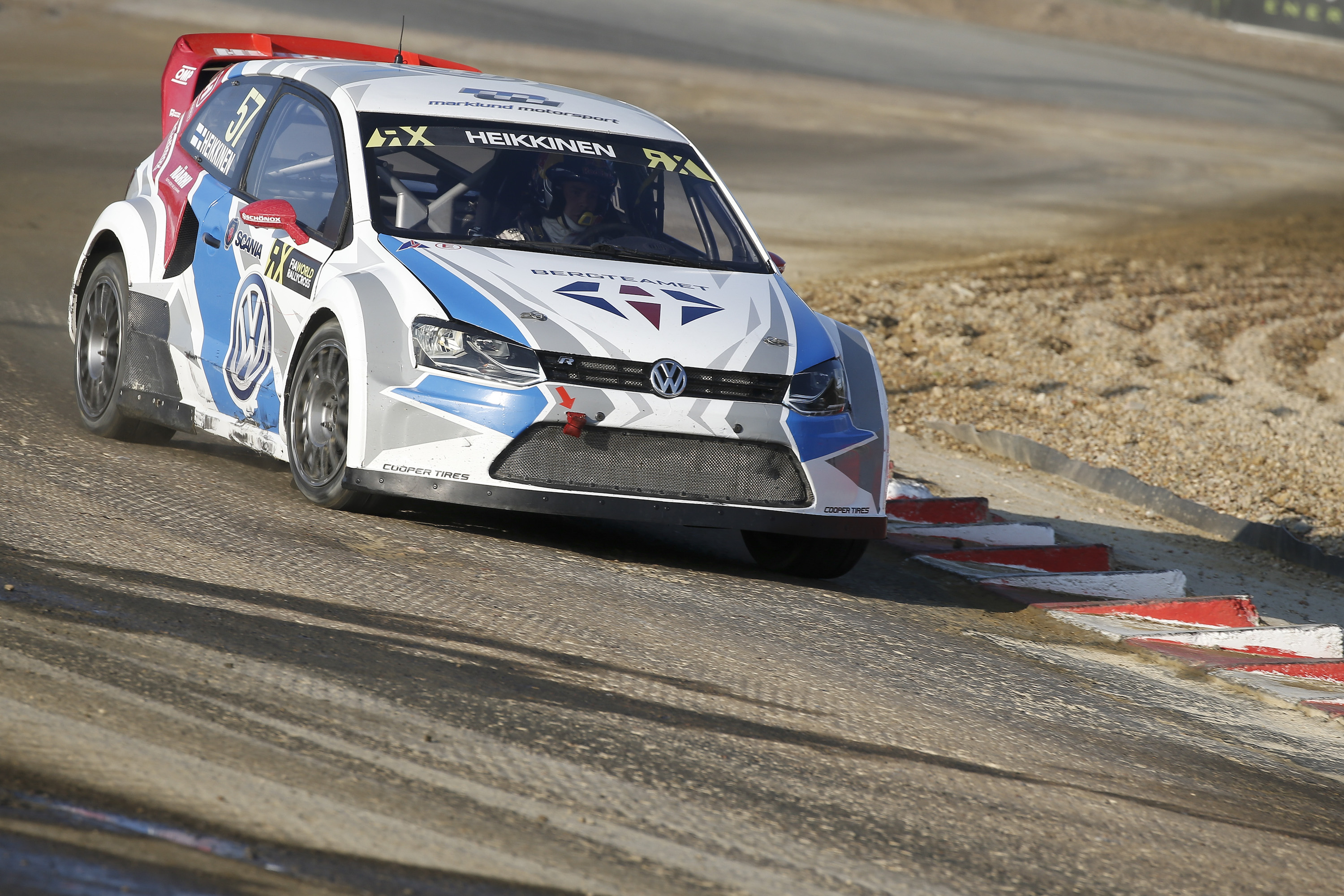
Heikkinen at the 2015 World RX of France

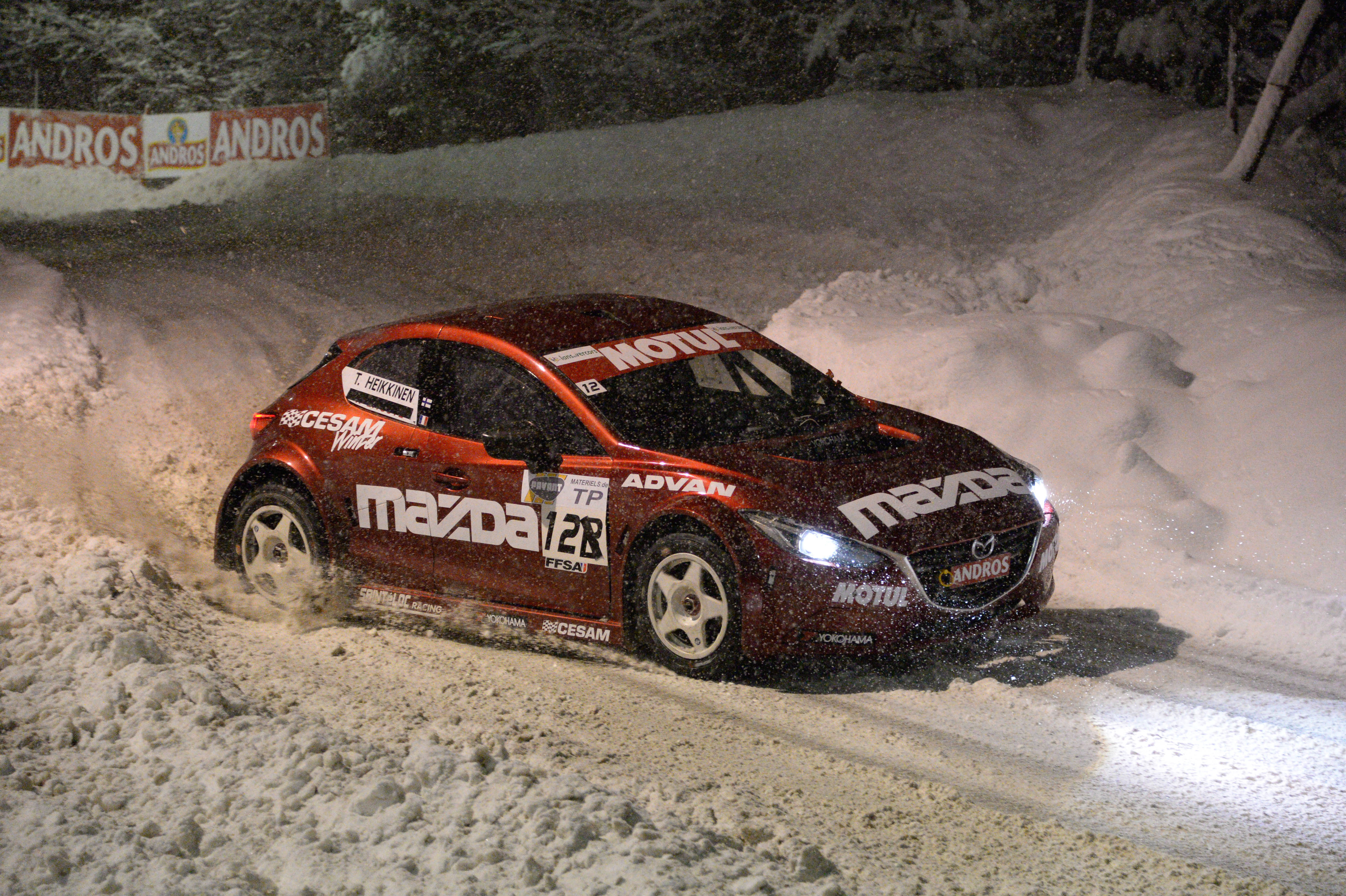
Heikkinen pictured during an Andros Trophy race in 2015

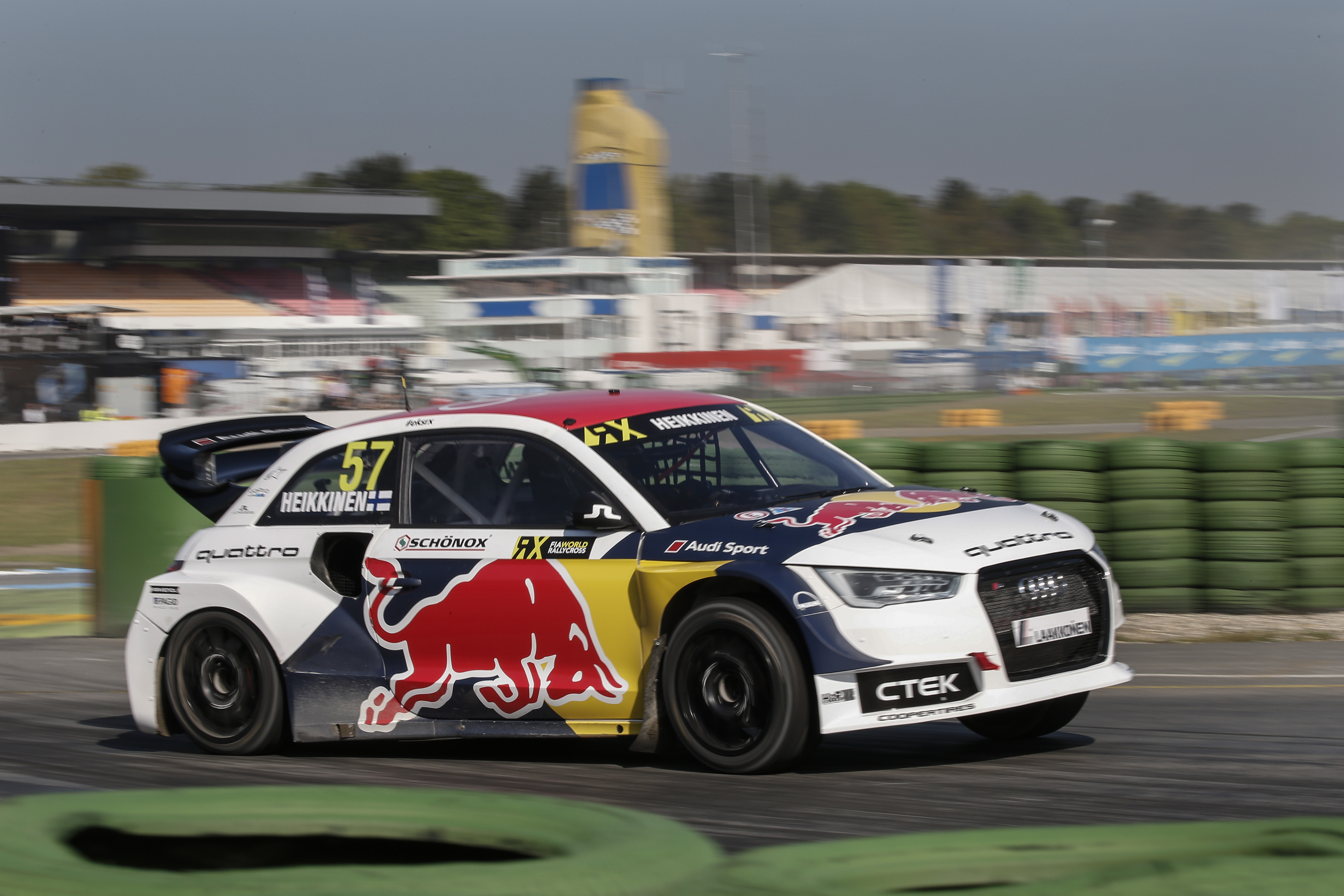
Heikkinen at the 2016 World RX of Hockenheim

=== Complete FIA European Rallycross Championship results ===
(key)

==== Division 1 ====
Year	Entrant	Car	1	2	3	4	5	6	7	8	9	10	ERX	Points
2010	Per Eklund Motorsport	Saab 9-3	POR	FRA	GBR	HUN	SWE	FIN; 13	BEL	GER	POL; 9	CZE; 11	19th	18

==== Supercar ====
Year	Entrant	Car	1	2	3	4	5	6	7	8	9	10	ERX	Points
2011	Per Eklund Motorsport	Saab 9-3	GBR; 6	POR; NC	FRA; 8	NOR; 5	SWE; 3	BEL; 7	NED; 7	AUT; 10	POL; 4	CZE; 14	6th	87
2013	Olsbergs MSE	Ford Fiesta	GBR	POR	HUN	FIN; 7	NOR	SWE	FRA	AUT	GER		18th	18

=== Complete Global RallyCross Championship results ===
(key)

==== Supercar ====
Year	Entrant	Car	1	2	3	4	5	6	7	8	9	10	GRC	Points
2012	Bluebeam Olsbergs MSE	Ford Fiesta ST	CHA; 10	TEX; 18	LA	NH	LV; 4	LVC; 5					14th	33
2013	Bluebeam Olsbergs MSE	Ford Fiesta ST	BRA; 2	MUN1; 3	MUN2; 1	LOU; 1	BRI; 1	IRW; 1	ATL; 1	CHA; 3	LV; 4		1st	169
2014	Marklund Motorsport	Volkswagen Polo	BAR	AUS; 16	DC	NY	CHA	DAY	LA1	LA2	SEA	LV	NC	0

=== Complete FIA World Rallycross Championship results ===
(key)

==== Supercar ====
Year	Entrant	Car	1	2	3	4	5	6	7	8	9	10	11	12	13	WRX	Points
2014	Marklund Motorsport	Volkswagen Polo	POR; 4	GBR; 4	NOR; 7	FIN; 7	SWE; 8	BEL; 1	CAN; 5	FRA; 10	GER; 5	ITA; 8	TUR; 3	ARG; 5		2nd	221
2015	Marklund Motorsport	Volkswagen Polo	POR; 8	HOC; 4	BEL; 1	GBR; 15	GER; 13	SWE; 4	CAN; 2	NOR; 19	FRA; 7	BAR; 8	TUR; 14	ITA; 13	ARG; 9	9th	137
2016	EKS RX	Audi S1	POR; 3	HOC; 2	BEL; 16	GBR; 11	NOR; 9	SWE; 9	CAN; 4	FRA; 15	BAR; 9	LAT; 9	GER; 9	ARG; 3		7th	150
2017	EKS RX	Audi S1	BAR; 8	POR; 12	HOC; 6	BEL; 9	GBR; 12	NOR; 11	SWE; 14	CAN; 5	FRA; 11	LAT; 8	GER; 3	RSA; 11		7th	125
2018	MJP Racing Team Austria	Ford Fiesta	BAR	POR	BEL	GBR	NOR	SWE	CAN	FRA; 14	LAT; 15	USA	GER	RSA		20th	5
2019	GRX SET	Hyundai i20	ABU	BAR	BEL	GBR	NOR	SWE	CAN	FRA; 7	LAT	RSA				19th	15
