= 2017 World RX of Sweden =

Rallycross event

- Round 7 of 12 in the 2017 FIA World Rallycross Championship
- Date: 1–2 July 2017
- Location: Höljes, Värmland
- Venue: Höljesbanan

Results
Heat winners
- Heat 1: (France) Sébastien Loeb; Team Peugeot-Hansen
- Heat 2: Johan Kristoffersson; PSRX Volkswagen Sweden
- Heat 3: Johan Kristoffersson; PSRX Volkswagen Sweden
- Heat 4: (Norway) Petter Solberg; PSRX Volkswagen Sweden
Semi-final winners
- Semi-final 1: Johan Kristoffersson; PSRX Volkswagen Sweden
- Semi-final 2: (Norway) Andreas Bakkerud; Hoonigan Racing Division
Final
- First: Johan Kristoffersson; PSRX Volkswagen Sweden
- Second: (Norway) Andreas Bakkerud; Hoonigan Racing Division
- Third: (France) Sébastien Loeb; Team Peugeot-Hansen

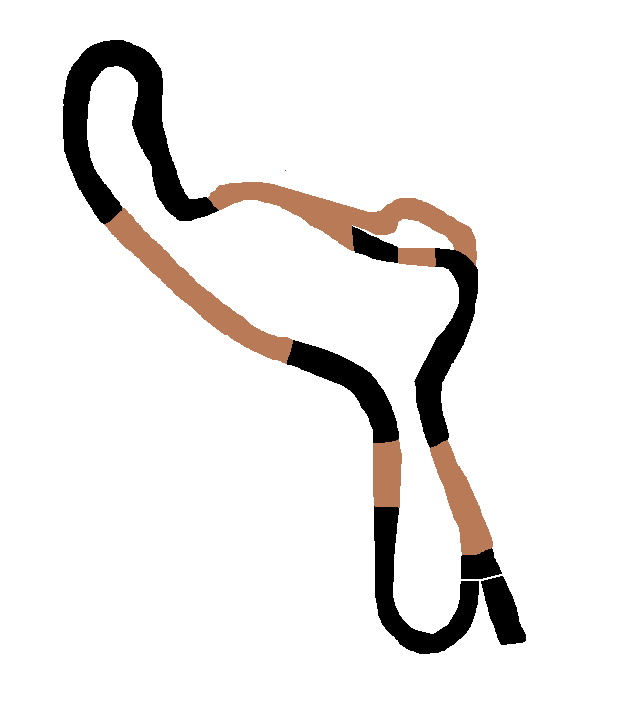
Rallycross layout of the Höljesbanan

The 2017 World RX of Sweden, formally known as the 2017 Swecon World RX of Sweden, for sponsorship reasons, was the seventh round of the fourth season of the FIA World Rallycross Championship. The event was held at the Höljesbanan in the village of Höljes, Värmland and also hosted round six of the European Rallycross Championship and round four of the RX2 International Series, the main support category for the World Rallycross Championship.

== Background ==
Reigning world champion and second in the 2017 standings, Mattias Ekström, was absent from the event due to his commitment in the DTM at the Norisring, held on the same weekend. Swedish rally driver Per-Gunnar Andersson was selected by EKS RX as Ekström's replacement, while Reinis Nitišs was nominated as the point scorer for EKS RX in the Teams' Championship, alongside Toomas Heikkinen.

Olsbergs MSE, who left the Championship in 2016, entered two Ford Fiesta ST's for Sebastian Eriksson and Oliver Eriksson, but were ineligible to score points in the Teams' Championship.

The attendance record was broken for the fourth year in a row, with 45,100 spectators, up from 44,400 in 2016.

== Supercar ==
=== Heats ===
Pos.	No.	Driver	Team	Car	Q1	Q2	Q3	Q4	Pts
1	3	(Sweden) Johan Kristoffersson	PSRX Volkswagen Sweden	Volkswagen Polo GTI	2nd	1st	1st	2nd	16
2	11	(Norway) Petter Solberg	PSRX Volkswagen Sweden	Volkswagen Polo GTI	4th	6th	2nd	1st	15
3	9	(France) Sébastien Loeb	Team Peugeot-Hansen	Peugeot 208	1st	5th	6th	3rd	14
4	13	(Norway) Andreas Bakkerud	Hoonigan Racing Division	Ford Focus RS	3rd	3rd	3rd	8th	13
5	21	(Sweden) Timmy Hansen	Team Peugeot-Hansen	Peugeot 208	7th	4th	4th	4th	12
6	96	(Sweden) Kevin Eriksson	MJP Racing Team Austria	Ford Fiesta	8th	2nd	8th	5th	11
7	68	(Finland) Niclas Grönholm	GRX	Ford Fiesta	5th	8th	7th	6th	10
8	6	(Latvia) Jānis Baumanis	STARD	Ford Fiesta	12th	16th	5th	7th	9
9	43	(United States) Ken Block	Hoonigan Racing Division	Ford Focus RS	6th	7th	20th	12th	8
10	44	(Germany) Timo Scheider	MJP Racing Team Austria	Ford Fiesta	10th	10th	9th	18th	7
11	17	(Russia) Timur Timerzyanov	STARD	Ford Fiesta	15th	11th	13th	9th	6
12	93	(Sweden) Sebastian Eriksson	Olsbergs MSE	Ford Fiesta ST	13th	14th	12th	10th	5
13	71	(Sweden) Kevin Hansen	Team Peugeot-Hansen	Peugeot 208	11th	9th	21st	13th	4
14	57	(Finland) Toomas Heikkinen	EKS RX	Audi S1	9th	20th	10th	15th	3
15	45	(Sweden) Per-Gunnar Andersson	EKS RX	Audi S1	17th	15th	16th	11th	2
16	87	(France) Jean-Baptiste Dubourg	DA Racing	Peugeot 208	18th	17th	11th	14th	1
17	98	(Sweden) Oliver Eriksson	Olsbergs MSE	Ford Fiesta ST	16th	12th	18th	16th	
18	15	(Latvia) Reinis Nitišs	EKS RX	Audi S1	14th	13th	14th	DNF	
19	60	(Finland) Joni-Pekka Rajala	Vaaranmara Racing	Mitsubishi Mirage	19th	18th	15th	19th	
20	84	(France) "Knapick"	Hervé "Knapick" Lemonnier	Citroën DS3	22nd	19th	19th	20th	
21	100	(United Kingdom) Guy Wilks	LOCO World RX Team	Volkswagen Polo	20th	21st	22nd	17th	
22	10	(Hungary) "Csucsu"	Speedy Motorsport	Kia Rio	21st	EXC	17th	DNF	

=== Semi-finals ===
Semi-final 1

Pos.	No.	Driver	Team	Time	Pts
1	3	(Sweden) Johan Kristoffersson	PSRX Volkswagen Sweden	04:17.248	6
2	9	(France) Sébastien Loeb	Team Peugeot-Hansen	+1.296	5
3	21	(Sweden) Timmy Hansen	Team Peugeot-Hansen	+2.487	4
4	43	(United States) Ken Block	Hoonigan Racing Division	+3.157	3
5	7	(Russia) Timur Timerzyanov	STARD	+5.368	2
6	68	(Finland) Niclas Grönholm	GRX	+5.437	1

Semi-final 2

Pos.	No.	Driver	Team	Time	Pts
1	13	(Norway) Andreas Bakkerud	Hoonigan Racing Division	04:17.977	6
2	96	(Sweden) Kevin Eriksson	MJP Racing Team Austria	+3.155	5
3	6	(Latvia) Jānis Baumanis	STARD	+4.075	4
4	93	(Sweden) Sebastian Eriksson	Olsbergs MSE	+4.631	3
5	44	(Germany) Timo Scheider	MJP Racing Team Austria	+5.129	2
6	11	(Norway) Petter Solberg	PSRX Volkswagen Sweden	+5.561	1

=== Final ===
Pos.	No.	Driver	Team	Time	Pts
1	3	(Sweden) Johan Kristoffersson	PSRX Volkswagen Sweden	04:14.579	8
2	13	(Norway) Andreas Bakkerud	Hoonigan Racing Division	+2.363	5
3	9	(France) Sébastien Loeb	Team Peugeot-Hansen	+2.901	4
4	21	(Sweden) Timmy Hansen	Team Peugeot-Hansen	+6.194	3
5	96	(Sweden) Kevin Eriksson	MJP Racing Team Austria	+6.805	2
6	6	(Latvia) Jānis Baumanis	STARD	+12.650	1

== RX2 International Series ==
=== Heats ===
Pos.	No.	Driver	Team	Q1	Q2	Q3	Q4	Pts
1	13	(France) Cyril Raymond	Olsbergs MSE	1st	1st	1st	1st	16
2	40	(United Kingdom) Dan Rooke	Dan Rooke	2nd	DNF	8th	2nd	15
3	19	(Sweden) Andreas Bäckman	Olsbergs MSE	12th	6th	4th	7th	14
4	98	(Norway) Stein Fredric Akre	Stein Fredric Akre	5th	17th	9th	5th	13
5	6	(Sweden) William Nilsson	JC Raceteknik	9th	14th	3rd	13th	12
6	96	(Belgium) Guillaume De Ridder	Guillaume De Ridder	3rd	13th	10th	15th	11
7	8	(Norway) Simon Wågø Syversen	Set Promotion	17h	4th	18th	3rd	10
8	21	(Sweden) Marcus Höglund	JC Raceteknik	6th	10th	17th	8th	9
9	56	(Norway) Thomas Holmen	Bard Holmen	4th	8th	20th	10th	8
10	18	(Sweden) Linus Östlund	Linus Östlund	11th	11th	2nd	21st	7
11	52	(Sweden) Simon Olofsson	Simon Olofsson	15th	3rd	DNF	4th	6
12	9	(Norway) Glenn Haug	Glenn Haug	8th	19th	11th	6th	5
13	12	(Sweden) Anders Michalak	Anders Michalak	7th	12th	5th	20th	4
14	69	(Norway) Sondre Evjen	JC Raceteknik	13th	5th	19th	12th	3
15	2	(Norway) Ben-Philip Gundersen	Ben-Philip Gundersen	10th	18th	6th	16th	2
16	11	(United States) Tanner Whitten	Olsbergs MSE	20th	2nd	15th	18th	1
17	51	(Sweden) Sandra Hultgren	Sandra Hultgren	14th	9th	14th	17th	
18	91	(Sweden) Jonathan Walfridsson	Helmia Motorsport	19th	7th	21st	9th	
19	51	(Latvia) Vasily Gryazin	Sports Racing Technologies	16th	DNF	7th	11th	
20	17	(Sweden) Hampus Rådström	Hampus Rådström	18th	16th	16th	14th	
21	58	(Sweden) Santosh Berggren	A. Berggrens Bilservice Floby	22nd	15th	13th	DNF	
22	26	(Sweden) Jessica Bäckman	Olsbergs MSE	21st	DNF	12th	19th	

=== Semi-finals ===
Semi-final 1

Pos.	No.	Driver	Team	Time	Pts
1	13	(France) Cyril Raymond	Olsbergs MSE	4:36.396	6
2	6	(Sweden) William Nilsson	JC Raceteknik	+1.805	5
3	19	(Sweden) Andreas Bäckman	Olsbergs MSE	+2.692	4
4	56	(Norway) Thomas Holmen	Bard Holmen	+5.795	3
5	8	(Norway) Simon Wågø Syversen	Set Promotion	+6.534	2
6	52	(Sweden) Simon Olofsson	Simon Olofsson	+22.374	1

Semi-final 2

Pos.	No.	Driver	Team	Time	Pts
1	40	(United Kingdom) Dan Rooke	Dan Rooke	4:38.753	6
2	96	(Belgium) Guillaume De Ridder	Guillaume De Ridder	+1.437	5
3	98	(Norway) Stein Fredric Akre	Stein Fredric Akre	+2.506	4
4	18	(Sweden) Linus Östlund	Linus Östlund	+2.790	3
5	9	(Norway) Glenn Haug	Glenn Haug	+3.218	2
6	21	(Sweden) Marcus Höglund	JC Raceteknik	DNF	1

=== Final ===
Pos.	No.	Driver	Team	Time	Pts
1	40	(United Kingdom) Dan Rooke	Dan Rooke	4:42.579	8
2	96	(Belgium) Guillaume De Ridder	Guillaume De Ridder	+1.437	5
3	6	(Sweden) William Nilsson	JC Raceteknik	+1.724	4
4	19	(Sweden) Andreas Bäckman	Olsbergs MSE	+1.979	3
5	98	(Norway) Stein Fredric Akre	Stein Fredric Akre	+20.368	2
6	13	(France) Cyril Raymond	Olsbergs MSE	+44.991	1

== Standings after the event ==
Supercar standings

Pos.	Driver	Pts	Gap
1	(Sweden) Johan Kristoffersson	181	
2	(Norway) Petter Solberg	150	+31
3	(Sweden) Mattias Ekström	143	+38
4	(France) Sébastien Loeb	125	+56
5	(Norway) Andreas Bakkerud	124	+57

RX2 standings

Pos	Driver	Pts	Gap
1	(France) Cyril Raymond	108	
2	(United Kingdom) Dan Rooke	102	+6
3	(Belgium) Guillaume De Ridder	68	+40
4	(United States) Tanner Whitten	60	+48
5	(Norway) Glenn Haug	59	+49

- Note: Only the top five positions are included.

Previous race: 2017 World RX of Norway	FIA World Rallycross Championship; 2017 season	Next race: 2017 World RX of Canada
Previous race: 2016 World RX of Sweden	World RX of Sweden	Next race: 2018 World RX of Sweden
