= 2017 World RX of Canada =

Rallycross event

- Round 8 of 12 in the 2017 FIA World Rallycross Championship
- Date: 5–6 August 2017
- Location: Trois-Rivières, Quebec
- Venue: Circuit Trois-Rivières

Results
Heat winners
- Heat 1: (Finland) Toomas Heikkinen; EKS RX
- Heat 2: Johan Kristoffersson; PSRX Volkswagen Sweden
- Heat 3: Mattias Ekström; PSRX Volkswagen Sweden
- Heat 4: Johan Kristoffersson; PSRX Volkswagen Sweden
Semi-final winners
- Semi-final 1: Johan Kristoffersson; PSRX Volkswagen Sweden
- Semi-final 2: (Norway) Petter Solberg; PSRX Volkswagen Sweden
Final
- First: Johan Kristoffersson; PSRX Volkswagen Sweden
- Second: (Norway) Petter Solberg; PSRX Volkswagen Sweden
- Third: (France) Sébastien Loeb; Team Peugeot-Hansen

World RX layout of Circuit Trois-Rivières

The 2017 World RX of Canada was the eighth round of the fourth season of the FIA World Rallycross Championship. The event was held at the Circuit Trois-Rivières in Trois-Rivières, Quebec.

== Heats ==
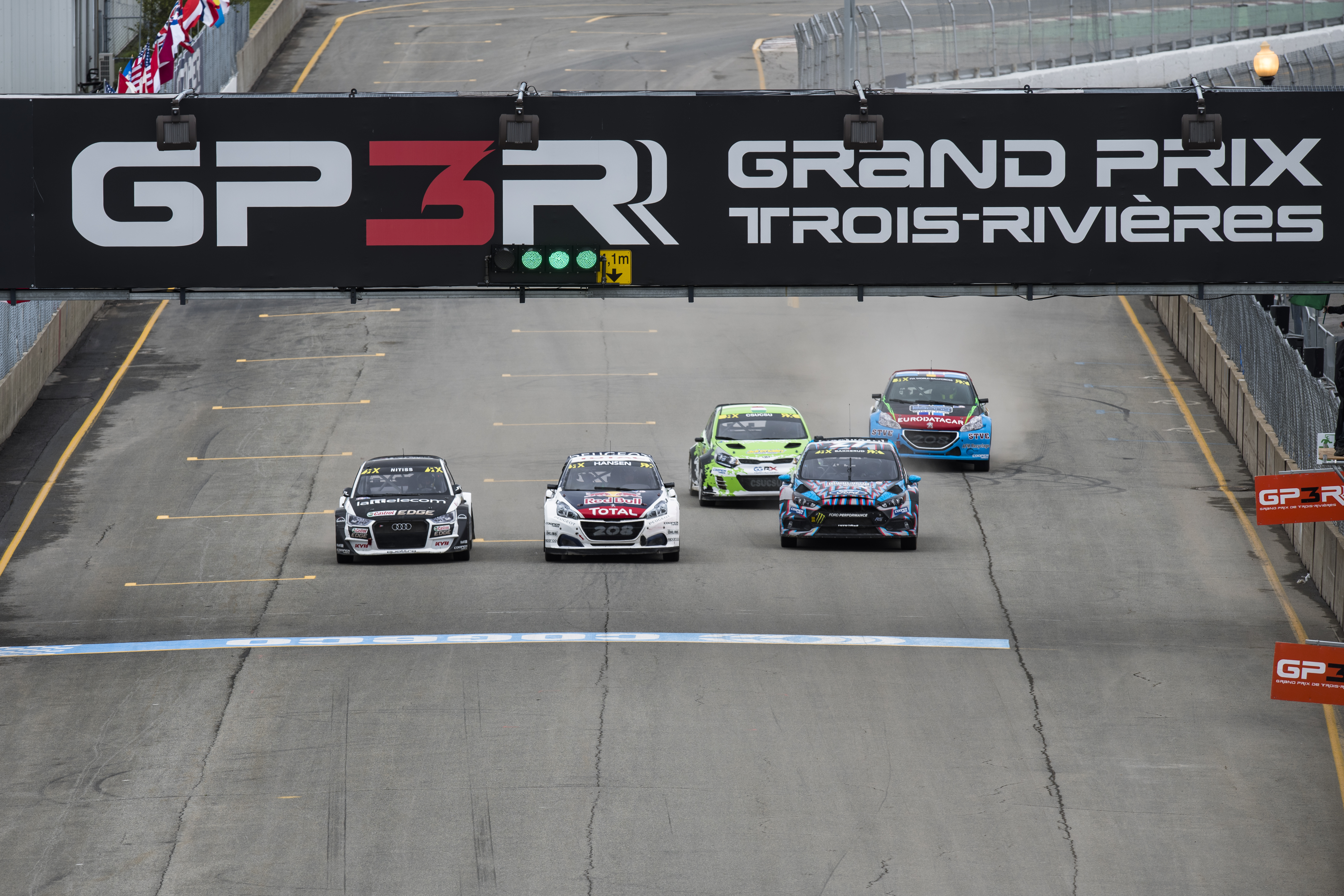
The race for the first corner with Nitišs, Timmy Hansen, "Csucsu", Bakkerud and Demoustier

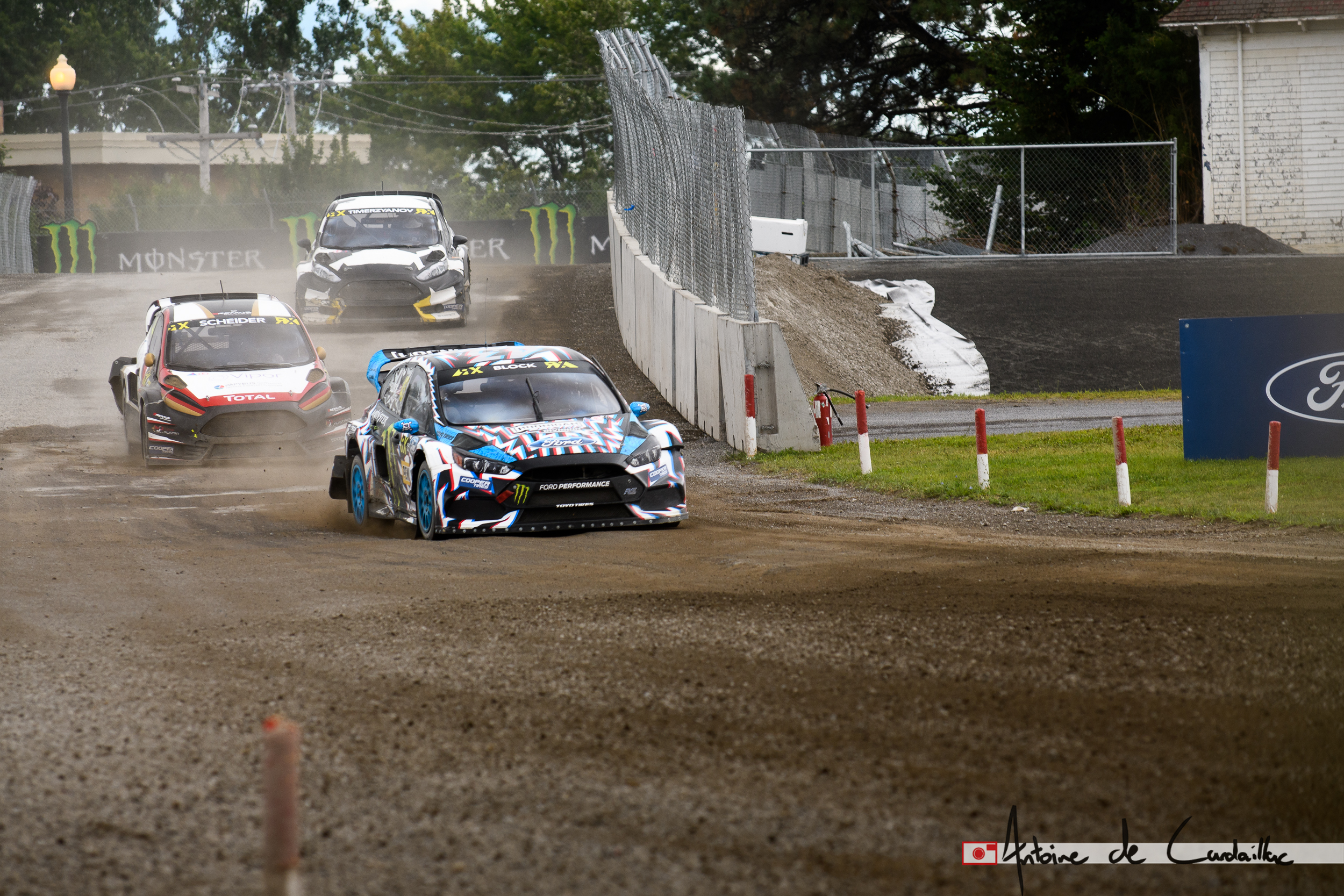
Ken Block, Timo Scheider and Timur Timerzyanov

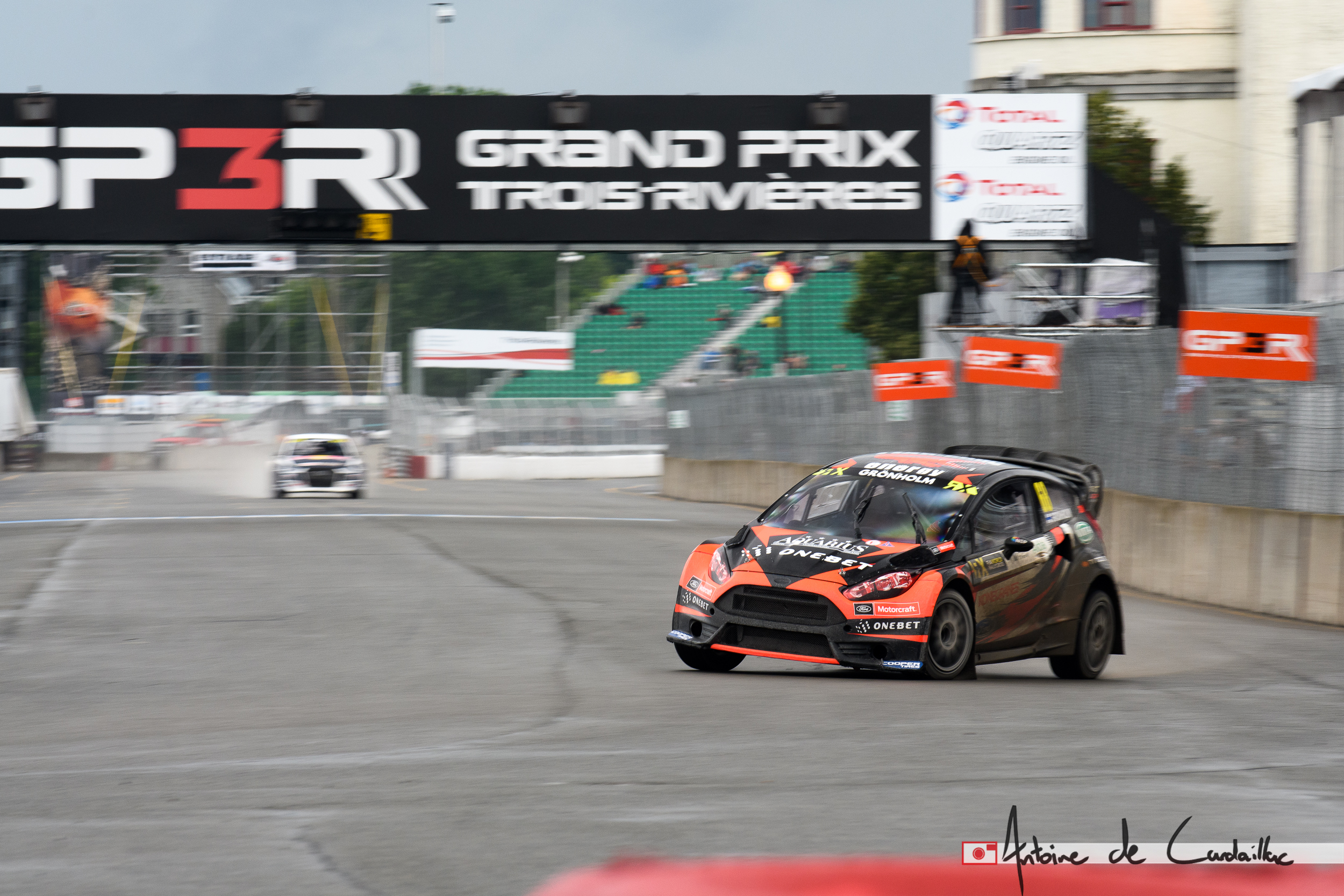
Niclas Grönholm

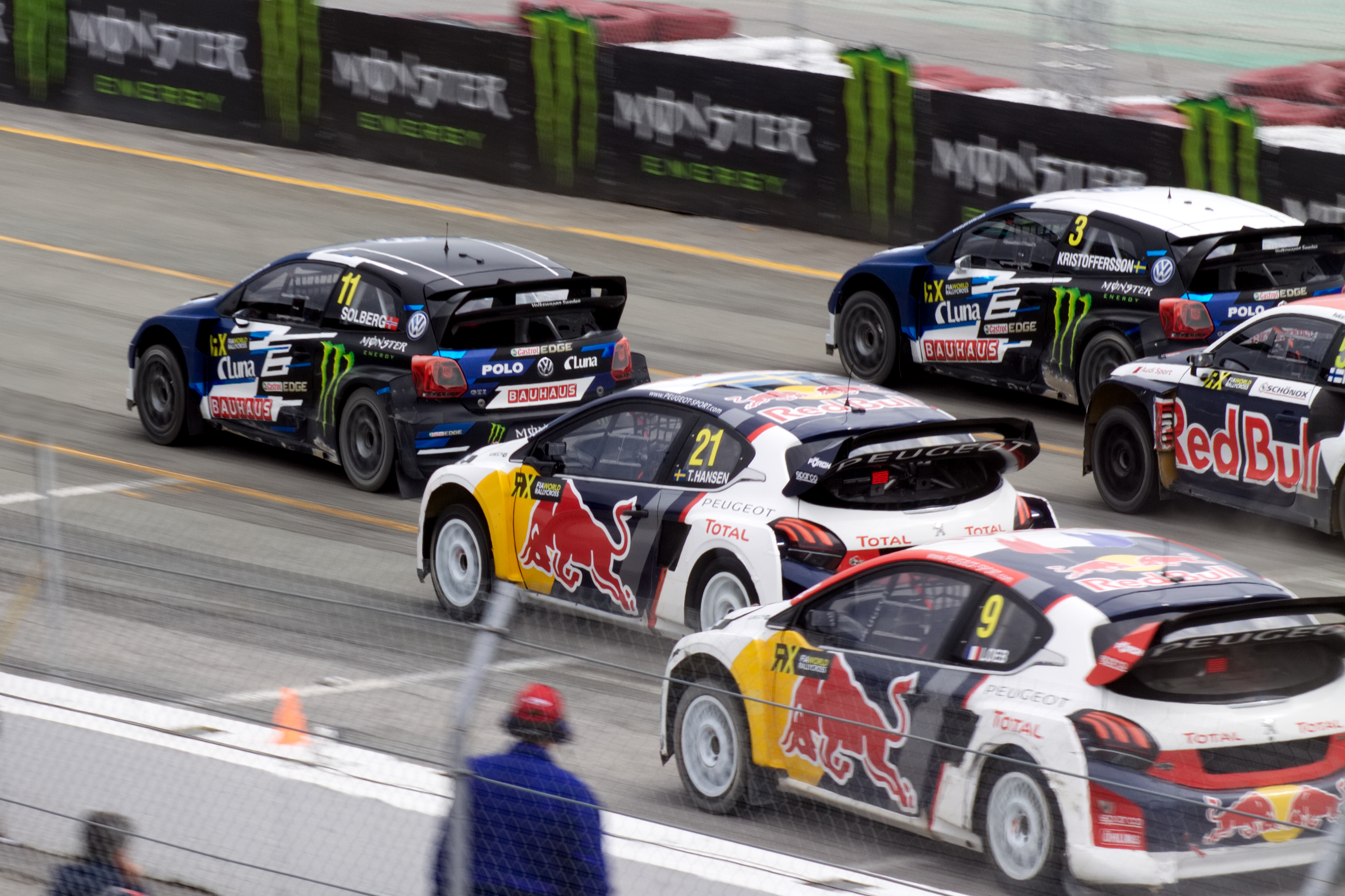
Solberg gets the jump on team-mate Kristoffersson in the Final

Pos.	No.	Driver	Team	Car	Q1	Q2	Q3	Q4	Pts
1	3	(Sweden) Johan Kristoffersson	PSRX Volkswagen Sweden	Volkswagen Polo GTI	2nd	1st	2nd	1st	16
2	11	(Norway) Petter Solberg	PSRX Volkswagen Sweden	Volkswagen Polo GTI	4th	3rd	3rd	2nd	15
3	1	(Sweden) Mattias Ekström	EKS RX	Audi S1	4th	7th	1st	6th	14
4	57	(Finland) Toomas Heikkinen	EKS RX	Audi S1	1st	5th	6th	10th	13
5	96	(Sweden) Kevin Eriksson	MJP Racing Team Austria	Ford Fiesta	3rd	6th	5th	17th	12
6	9	(France) Sébastien Loeb	Team Peugeot-Hansen	Peugeot 208	10th	15th	4th	4th	11
7	6	(Latvia) Jānis Baumanis	STARD	Ford Fiesta	8th	8th	10th	9th	10
8	43	(United States) Ken Block	Hoonigan Racing Division	Ford Focus RS	5th	4th	7th	19th	9
9	21	(Sweden) Timmy Hansen	Team Peugeot-Hansen	Peugeot 208	8th	18th	14th	3rd	8
10	7	(Russia) Timur Timerzyanov	STARD	Ford Fiesta	17th	9th	10th	7th	7
11	71	(Sweden) Kevin Hansen	Team Peugeot-Hansen	Peugeot 208	13th	8th	11th	11th	6
12	44	(Germany) Timo Scheider	MJP Racing Team Austria	Ford Fiesta	11th	7th	13th	12th	5
13	13	(Norway) Andreas Bakkerud	Hoonigan Racing Division	Ford Focus RS	7th	20th	12th	6th	4
14	68	(Finland) Niclas Grönholm	GRX	Ford Fiesta	12th	11th	DNF	9th	3
15	100	(United Kingdom) Guy Wilks	LOCO Energy World RX	Volkswagen Polo	14th	12th	15th	14th	2
16	15	(Latvia) Reinis Nitišs	EKS RX	Audi S1	20th	17th	9th	13th	1
17	87	(France) Jean-Baptiste Dubourg	DA Racing	Peugeot 208	15th	14th	17th	15th	
18	77	(Germany) René Münnich	All-Inkl.com Münnich Motorsport	Citroën DS3	16th	13th	16th	16th	
19	10	(Hungary) "Csucsu"	Speedy Motorsport	Kia Rio	18th	16th	18th	DNF	
20	66	(France) Grégoire Demoustier	DA Racing	Peugeot 208	18th	19th	19th	19th	

== Semi-finals ==
Semi-final 1

Pos.	No.	Driver	Team	Time	Pts
1	3	(Sweden) Johan Kristoffersson	PSRX Volkswagen Sweden	05:05.170	6
2	21	(Sweden) Timmy Hansen	Team Peugeot-Hansen	+3.796	5
3	96	(Sweden) Kevin Eriksson	MJP Racing Team Austria	+4.942	4
4	71	(Sweden) Kevin Hansen	Team Peugeot-Hansen	+5.927	3
5	6	(Latvia) Jānis Baumanis	STARD	+9.567	2
6	1	(Sweden) Mattias Ekström	EKS RX	DNF	1

Semi-final 2

Pos.	No.	Driver	Team	Time	Pts
1	11	(Norway) Petter Solberg	PSRX Volkswagen Sweden	05:02.028	6
2	57	(Finland) Toomas Heikkinen	EKS RX	+6.413	5
3	9	(France) Sébastien Loeb	Team Peugeot-Hansen	+7.053	4
4	43	(United States) Ken Block	Hoonigan Racing Division	+13.211	3
5	44	(Germany) Timo Scheider	MJP Racing Team Austria	+13.905	2
6	7	(Russia) Timur Timerzyanov	STARD	+23.287	1

=== Final ===
Pos.	No.	Driver	Team	Time	Pts
1	3	(Sweden) Johan Kristoffersson	PSRX Volkswagen Sweden	05:02.704	8
2	11	(Norway) Petter Solberg	PSRX Volkswagen Sweden	+1.072	5
3	9	(France) Sébastien Loeb	Team Peugeot-Hansen	+4.498	4
4	96	(Sweden) Kevin Eriksson	MJP Racing Team Austria	+8.239	3
5	57	(Finland) Toomas Heikkinen	EKS RX	+20.847	2
6	21	(Sweden) Timmy Hansen	Team Peugeot-Hansen	DNF	1

== RX2 International Series ==
=== Heats ===
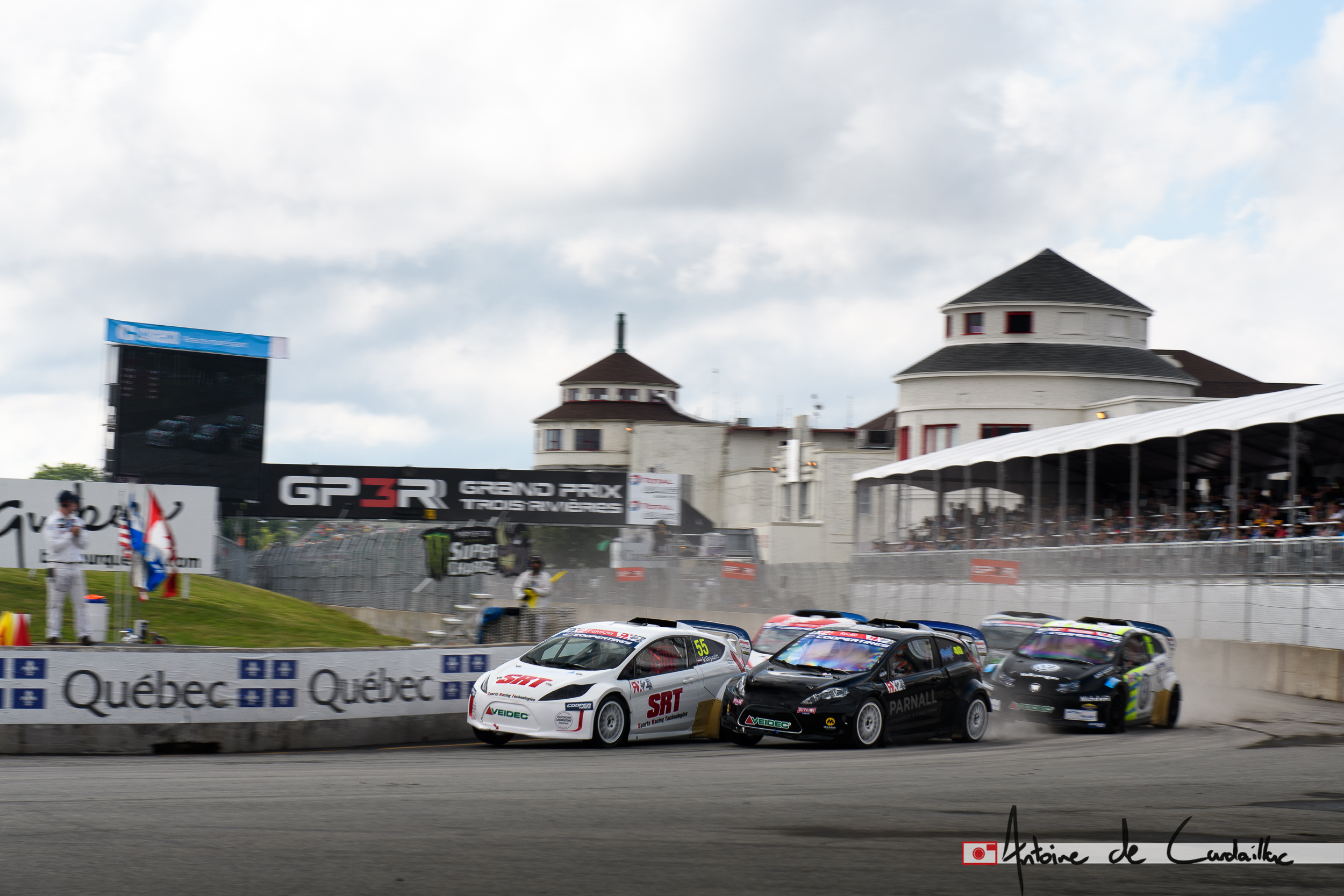
The start of the RX2 final

Pos.	No.	Driver	Team	Q1	Q2	Q3	Q4	Pts
1	13	(France) Cyril Raymond	Olsbergs MSE	1st	11th	2nd	1st	16
2	40	(United Kingdom) Dan Rooke	Dan Rooke	6th	1st	1st	4th	15
3	11	(United States) Tanner Whitten	Olsbergs MSE	5th	14th	5th	2nd	14
4	55	(Latvia) Vasily Gryazin	Sports Racing Technologies	3rd	12th	6th	2nd	13
5	96	(Belgium) Guillaume De Ridder	Guillaume De Ridder	2nd	10th	3rd	15th	12
6	69	(Norway) Sondre Evjen	JC Raceteknik	4th	13th	4th	6th	11
7	6	(Sweden) William Nilsson	JC Raceteknik	10th	4th	8th	8th	10
8	52	(Sweden) Simon Olofsson	Simon Olofsson	8th	2nd	DNF	9th	9
9	19	(Sweden) Andreas Bäckman	Olsbergs MSE	15th	3rd	7th	10th	8
10	51	(Sweden) Sandra Hultgren	Sandra Hultgren	7th	6th	11th	11th	7
11	9	(Sweden) Jessica Bäckman	Olsbergs MSE	16th	7th	9th	12th	6
12	53	(United States) Cole Keatts	Olsbergs MSE	12th	5th	12th	16th	5
13	9	(Norway) Glenn Haug	Glenn Haug	11th	15th	14th	7th	4
14	56	(Norway) Thomas Holmen	Bard Holmen	DNF	16th	13th	3rd	3
15	36	(France) Guerlain Chicherit	Olsbergs MSE	13th	9th	16th	13th	2
16	8	(Norway) Simon Wågø Syversen	Set Promotion	9th	DNF	10th	14th	1
17	12	(Sweden) Anders Michalak	Anders Michalak	14th	8th	15th	DNF	

=== Semi-finals ===
Semi-final 1

Pos.	No.	Driver	Team	Time	Pts
1	13	(France) Cyril Raymond	Olsbergs MSE	5:28.870	6
2	11	(United States) Tanner Whitten	Olsbergs MSE	+5.169	5
3	96	(Belgium) Guillaume De Ridder	Guillaume De Ridder	+9.188	4
4	26	(Sweden) Jessica Bäckman	Olsbergs MSE	+11.542	3
5	6	(Sweden) William Nilsson	JC Raceteknik	+11.722	2
6	19	(Sweden) Andreas Bäckman	Olsbergs MSE	+27.976	1

Semi-final 2

Pos.	No.	Driver	Team	Time	Pts
1	40	(United Kingdom) Dan Rooke	Dan Rooke	5:27.878	6
2	55	(Latvia) Vasily Gryazin	Sports Racing Technologies	+2.544	5
3	52	(Sweden) Simon Olofsson	Simon Olofsson	+5.263	4
4	69	(Norway) Sondre Evjen	JC Raceteknik	+5.657	3
5	53	(United States) Cole Keatts	Olsbergs MSE	+9.658	2
6	51	(Sweden) Sandra Hultgren	Sandra Hultgren	+10.184	1

=== Final ===
Pos.	No.	Driver	Team	Time	Pts
1	13	(France) Cyril Raymond	Olsbergs MSE	5:24.379	8
2	96	(Belgium) Guillaume De Ridder	Guillaume De Ridder	+6.859	5
3	11	(United States) Tanner Whitten	Olsbergs MSE	+8.619	4
4	55	(Latvia) Vasily Gryazin	Sports Racing Technologies	+18.609	3
5	52	(Norway) Simon Olofsson	Simon Olofsson	+21.517	2
6	40	(United Kingdom) Dan Rooke	Dan Rooke	DNF	1

== Standings after the event ==
Supercar standings

Pos	Pilot	Pts	Gap
1	(Sweden) Johan Kristoffersson	211	
2	(Norway) Petter Solberg	176	+35
3	(Sweden) Mattias Ekström	158	+53
4	(France) Sébastien Loeb	144	+67
5	(Sweden) Timmy Hansen	135	+76

RX2 standings

Pos	Driver	Pts	Gap
1	(France) Cyril Raymond	138	
2	(United Kingdom) Dan Rooke	124	+14
3	(Belgium) Guillaume De Ridder	89	+49
4	(United States) Tanner Whitten	83	+55
5	(Sweden) William Nilsson	75	+63

- Note: Only the top five positions are included.

Previous race: 2017 World RX of Sweden	FIA World Rallycross Championship; 2017 season	Next race: 2017 World RX of France
Previous race: 2016 World RX of Canada	World RX of Canada	Next race: 2018 World RX of Canada
