= 2016 World RX of Hockenheim =

Rallycross event

- Round 2 of 13 in the 2016 FIA World Rallycross Championship
- Date: 7–8 May 2016
- Location: Hockenheim, Baden-Württemberg
- Venue: Hockenheimring

Results
Heat winners
- Heat 1: (Sweden) Mattias Ekström; EKS RX
- Heat 2: Johan Kristoffersson; Volkswagen Team Sweden
- Heat 3: (Norway) Petter Solberg; Petter Solberg World RX Team
- Heat 4: (Finland) Toomas Heikkinen; EKS RX
Semi-final winners
- Semi-final 1: (Finland) Toomas Heikkinen; EKS RX
- Semi-final 2: (United Kingdom) Liam Doran; JRM Racing
Final
- First: (Sweden) Mattias Ekström; EKS RX
- Second: (Finland) Toomas Heikkinen; EKS RX
- Third: (United States) Ken Block; Hoonigan Racing Division

World RX layout of Hockenheimring

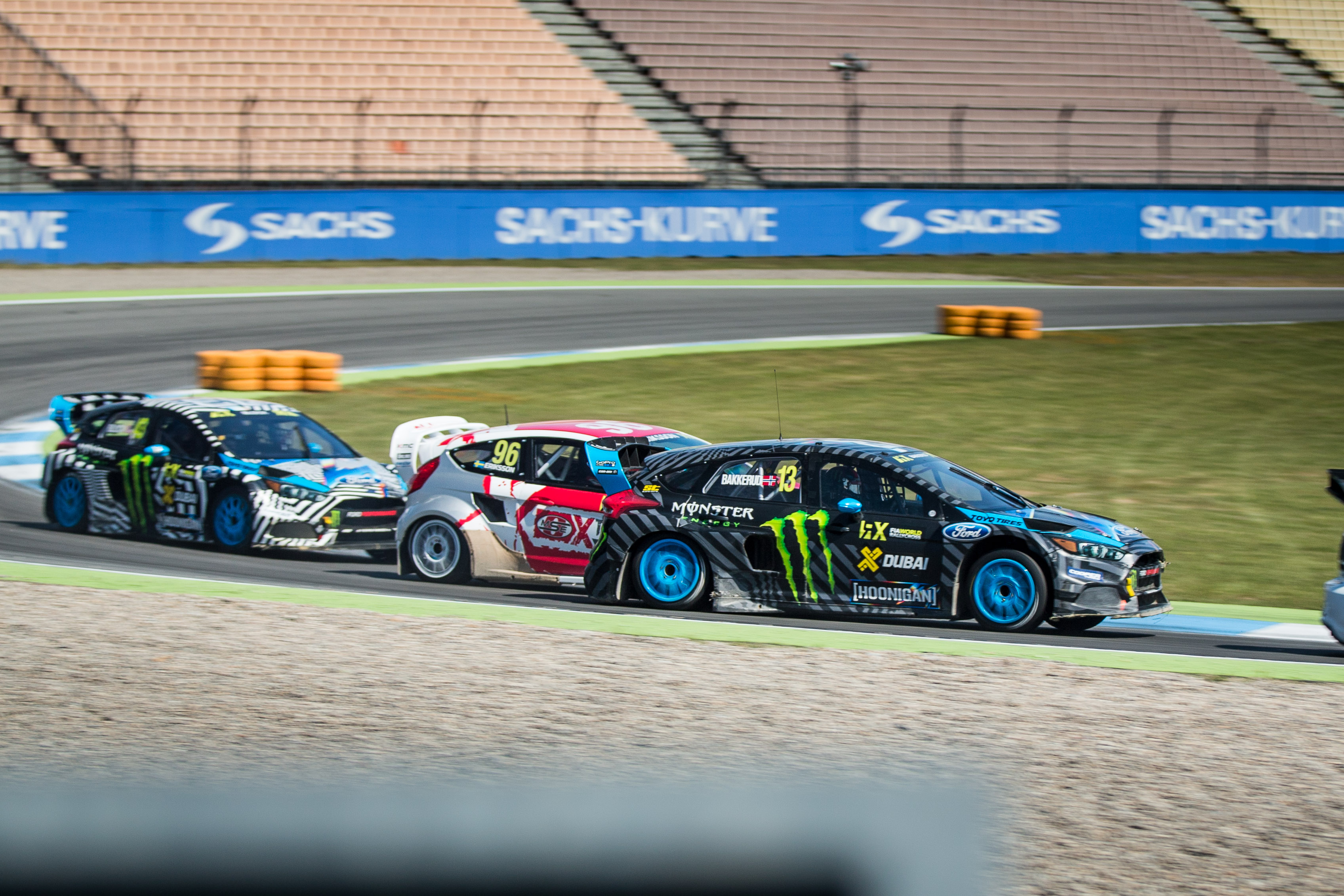
Andreas Bakkerud leads Kevin Eriksson and Ken Block

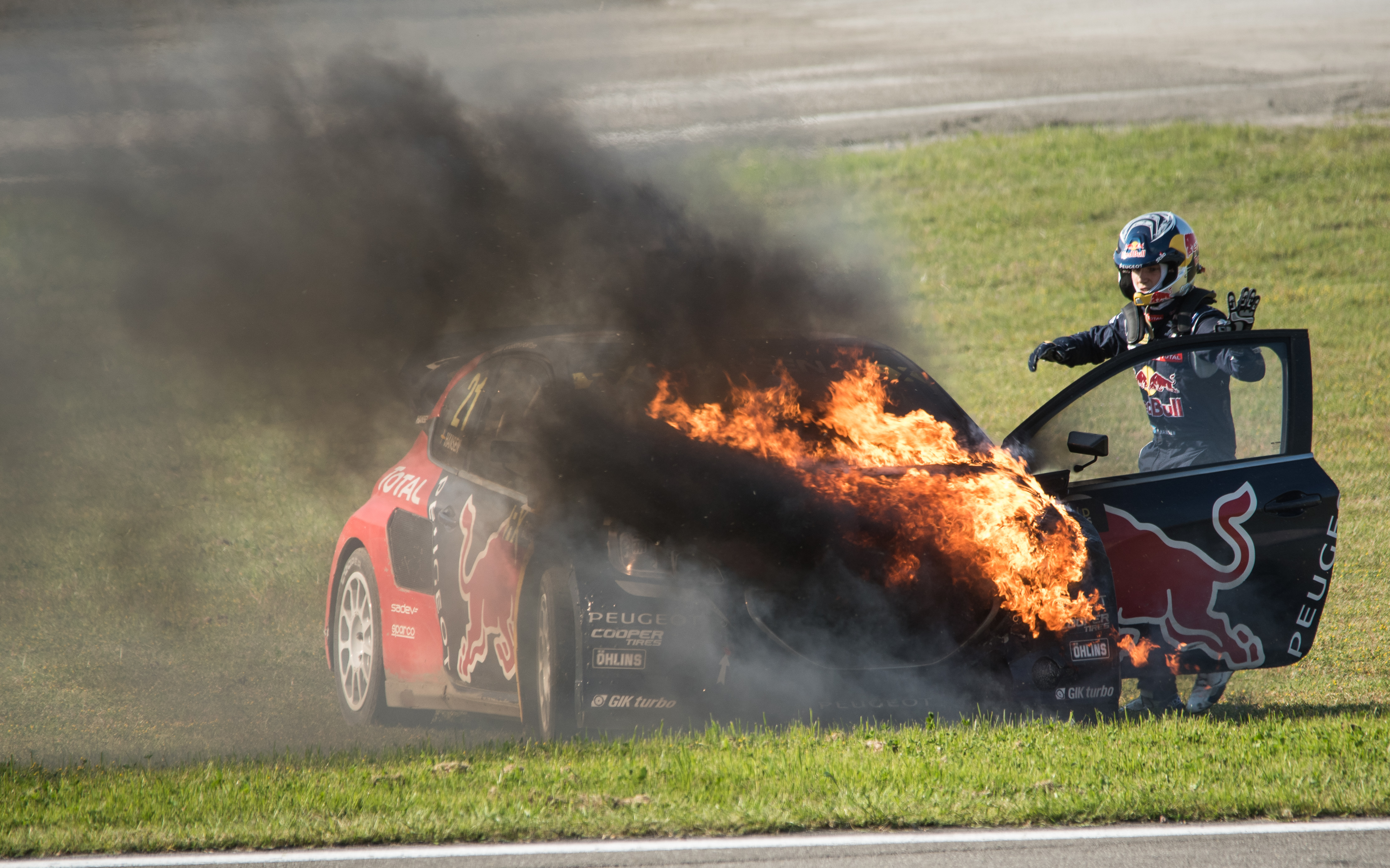
Timmy Hansen's car caught fire during his Q3 race

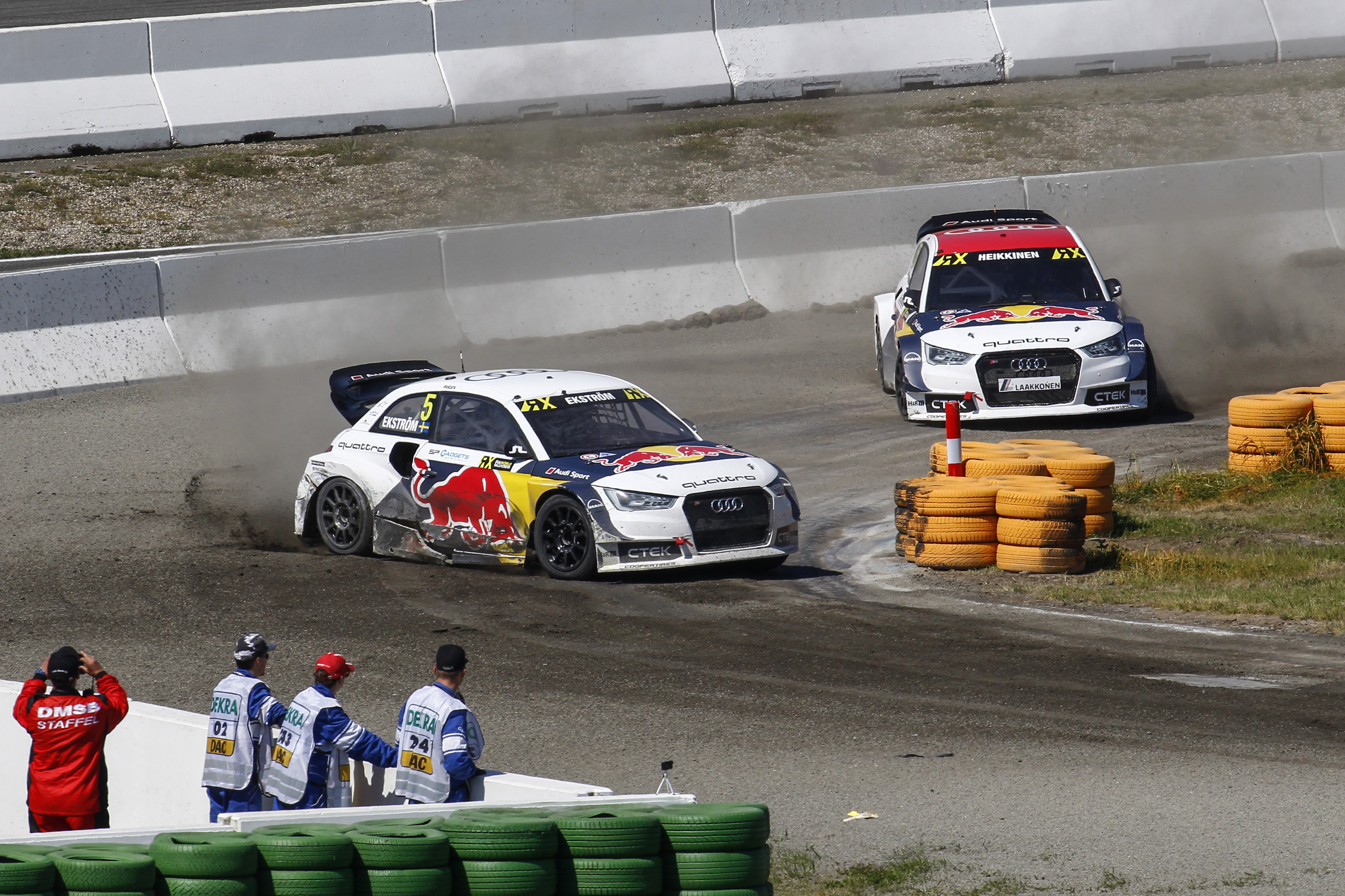
EKS RX secured their first 1-2 finish in the category

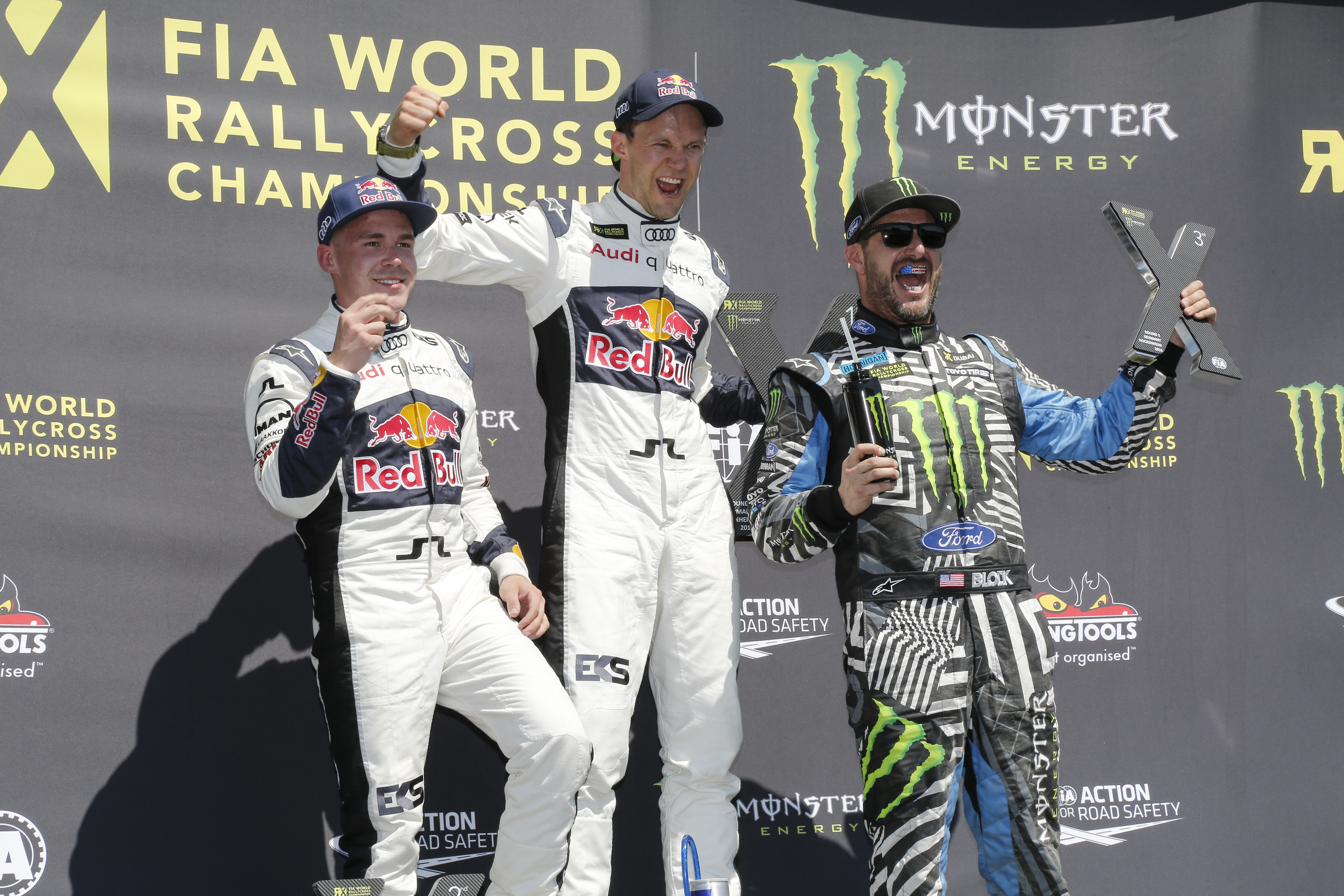
Event podium - (L-R) Toomas Heikkinen, Mattias Ekström and Ken Block

The 2016 World RX of Hockenheim was the second round of the third season of the FIA World Rallycross Championship. The event was held at the Hockenheimring in Hockenheim, Baden-Württemberg, alongside the Deutsche Tourenwagen Masters.

== Supercar ==
=== Heats ===
Pos.	No.	Driver	Team	Car	Q1	Q2	Q3	Q4	Pts
1	5	(Sweden) Mattias Ekström	EKS RX	Audi S1	1st	3rd	2nd	6th	16
2	3	(Sweden) Johan Kristoffersson	Volkswagen RX Sweden	Volkswagen Polo	4th	1st	5th	13th	15
3	57	(Finland) Toomas Heikkinen	EKS RX	Audi S1	13th	7th	12th	1st	14
4	6	(Latvia) Jānis Baumanis	World RX Team Austria	Ford Fiesta	12th	4th	4th	8th	13
5	17	(France) Davy Jeanney	Peugeot Hansen Academy	Peugeot 208	3rd	5th	6th	16th	12
6	1	(Norway) Petter Solberg	Petter Solberg World RX Team	Citroën DS3	5th	10th	1st	DNF	11
7	9	(France) Sébastien Loeb	Team Peugeot-Hansen	Peugeot 208	9th	14th	3rd	7th	10
8	96	(Sweden) Kevin Eriksson	Olsbergs MSE	Ford Fiesta ST	6th	9th	13th	9th	9
9	4	(Sweden) Robin Larsson	Larsson Jernberg Motorsport	Audi A1	17th	11th	7th	5th	8
10	33	(United Kingdom) Liam Doran	JRM Racing	BMW MINI Countryman	9th	14th	11th	4th	7
11	13	(Norway) Andreas Bakkerud	Hoonigan Racing Division	Ford Focus RS	DNF	6th	15th	2nd	6
12	43	(United States) Ken Block	Hoonigan Racing Division	Ford Focus RS	15th	13th	8th	11th	5
13	15	(Latvia) Reinis Nitišs	All-Inkl.com Münnich Motorsport	SEAT Ibiza	7th	8th	DNF	15th	4
14	68	(Finland) Niclas Grönholm	Olsbergs MSE	Ford Fiesta ST	10th	17th	16th	12th	3
15	92	(Sweden) Anton Marklund	Volkswagen RX Sweden	Volkswagen Polo	16th	16th	10th	14th	2
16	87	(France) Jean-Baptiste Dubourg	DA Racing	Citroën DS3	18th	19th	14th	10th	1
17	7	(Russia) Timur Timerzyanov	World RX Team Austria	Ford Fiesta	16th	16th	9th	DNF	
18	71	(Sweden) Kevin Hansen	Peugeot Hansen Academy	Peugeot 208	8th	12th	DNS	3rd	
19	55	(Germany) René Münnich	All-Inkl.com Münnich Motorsport	SEAT Ibiza	DNF	DNS	DNF	DNS	
20	31	(Austria) Max Pucher	World RX Team Austria	Ford Fiesta	DNS	DNS	DNS	DNS	
DSQ	21	(Sweden) Timmy Hansen	Team Peugeot-Hansen	Peugeot 208	2nd	2nd	DNF	EX	

* Timmy Hansen was excluded from Q4 and later disqualified from the whole event due to his car being underweight.

=== Semi-finals ===
Semi-final 1

Pos.	No.	Driver	Team	Time	Pts
1	57	(Finland) Toomas Heikkinen	EKS RX		6
2	5	(Sweden) Mattias Ekström	EKS RX	+0.470	5
3	4	(Sweden) Robin Larsson	Larsson Jernberg Motorsport	+4.138	4
4	9	(France) Sébastien Loeb	Team Peugeot-Hansen	+5.891	3
5	17	(France) Davy Jeanney	Peugeot Hansen Academy	+9.714	2
6	13	(Norway) Andreas Bakkerud	Hoonigan Racing Division	+26.081	1

Semi-final 2

Pos.	No.	Driver	Team	Time	Pts
1	33	(United Kingdom) Liam Doran	JRM Racing		6
2	1	(Norway) Petter Solberg	Petter Solberg World RX Team	+0.922	5
3	43	(United States) Ken Block	Hoonigan Racing Division	+1.323	4
4	3	(Sweden) Johan Kristoffersson	Volkswagen RX Sweden	+3.024	3
5	96	(Sweden) Kevin Eriksson	Olsbergs MSE	+18.573	2
6	6	(Latvia) Jānis Baumanis	World RX Team Austria	+28.651	1

=== Final ===
Pos.	No.	Driver	Team	Time	Pts
1	5	(Sweden) Mattias Ekström	EKS RX		8
2	57	(Finland) Toomas Heikkinen	EKS RX	+2.547	5
3	43	(United States) Ken Block	Hoonigan Racing Division	+3.827	4
4	1	(Norway) Petter Solberg	Petter Solberg World RX Team	+4.785	3
5	33	(United Kingdom) Liam Doran	JRM Racing	+10.587	2
6	4	(Sweden) Robin Larsson	Larsson Jernberg Motorsport	+34.781	1

== RX Lites ==
=== Heats ===
Pos.	No.	Driver	Team	Q1	Q2	Q3	Q4	Pts
1	16	(Norway) Thomas Bryntesson	JC Raceteknik	2nd	2nd	1st	1st	16
2	13	(France) Cyril Raymond	Olsbergs MSE	1st	1st	8th	6th	15
3	99	(Norway) Joachim Hvaal	JC Raceteknik	5th	3rd	2nd	2nd	14
4	75	(Germany) Patrick Simon	Olsbergs MSE	4th	5th	3rd	5th	13
5	8	(Norway) Simon Wågø Syversen	Set Promotion	6th	4th	5th	3rd	12
6	52	(Sweden) Simon Olofsson	Simon Olofsson	3rd	9th	6th	4th	11
7	47	(Sweden) Alexander Westlund	Alexander Westlund	8th	7th	4th	8th	10
8	33	(Kenya) Tejas Hirani	Olsbergs MSE	9th	6th	7th	7th	9
9	69	(Norway) Sondre Evjen	JC Raceteknik	7th	8th	9th	9th	8

=== Semi-finals ===
Semi-final 1

Pos.	No.	Driver	Team	Time	Pts
1	16	(Norway) Thomas Bryntesson	JC Raceteknik	6:02.867	6
2	99	(Norway) Joachim Hvaal	JC Raceteknik	+3.038	5
3	8	(Norway) Simon Wågø Syversen	Set Promotion	+5.306	4
4	47	(Sweden) Alexander Westlund	Alexander Westlund	+10.448	3
5	69	(Norway) Sondre Evjen	JC Raceteknik	+19.182	2

Semi-final 2

Pos.	No.	Driver	Team	Time	Pts
1	75	(Germany) Patrick Simon	Olsbergs MSE	6:09.574	6
2	13	(France) Cyril Raymond	Olsbergs MSE	+5.980	5
3	52	(Sweden) Simon Olofsson	Simon Olofsson	+42.402	4
4	33	(Kenya) Tejas Hirani	Olsbergs MSE	DNF	3

=== Final ===
Pos.	No.	Driver	Team	Time	Pts
1	16	(Norway) Thomas Bryntesson	JC Raceteknik	5:47.007	8
2	13	(France) Cyril Raymond	Olsbergs MSE	+1.786	5
3	99	(Norway) Joachim Hvaal	JC Raceteknik	+11.752	4
4	47	(Sweden) Alexander Westlund‡	Alexander Westlund	+12.378	3
5	75	(Germany) Patrick Simon	Olsbergs MSE	+14.033	2
6	8	(Norway) Simon Wågø Syversen	Set Promotion	DNF	1

‡Olofsson could not make the final and as a result the stewards permitted Westlund to replace him.

== Standings after the event ==
Supercar standings

Pos.	Driver	Pts	Gap
1	(Sweden) Mattias Ekström	48	
1	(Norway) Petter Solberg	48	
3	(Finland) Toomas Heikkinen	45	+3
4	(Sweden) Johan Kristoffersson	39	+9
5	(Sweden) Robin Larsson	34	+14

RX Lites standings

Pos	Driver	Pts	Gap
1	(Norway) Thomas Bryntesson	30	
2	(France) Cyril Raymond	25	+5
3	(Norway) Joachim Hvaal	23	+7
4	(Germany) Patrick Simon	21	+9
5	(Norway) Simon Wågø Syversen	17	+13

- Note: Only the top five positions are included for both sets of standings.

Previous race: 2016 World RX of Portugal	FIA World Rallycross Championship; 2016 season	Next race: 2016 World RX of Belgium
Previous race: 2015 World RX of Hockenheim	World RX of Hockenheim	Next race: 2017 World RX of Hockenheim
