= MJP Racing Team Austria =

- Founded: 2014
- Team principal(s): Max Pucher
- Current series: FIA World Rallycross Championship
- Former series: FIA European Rallycross Championship

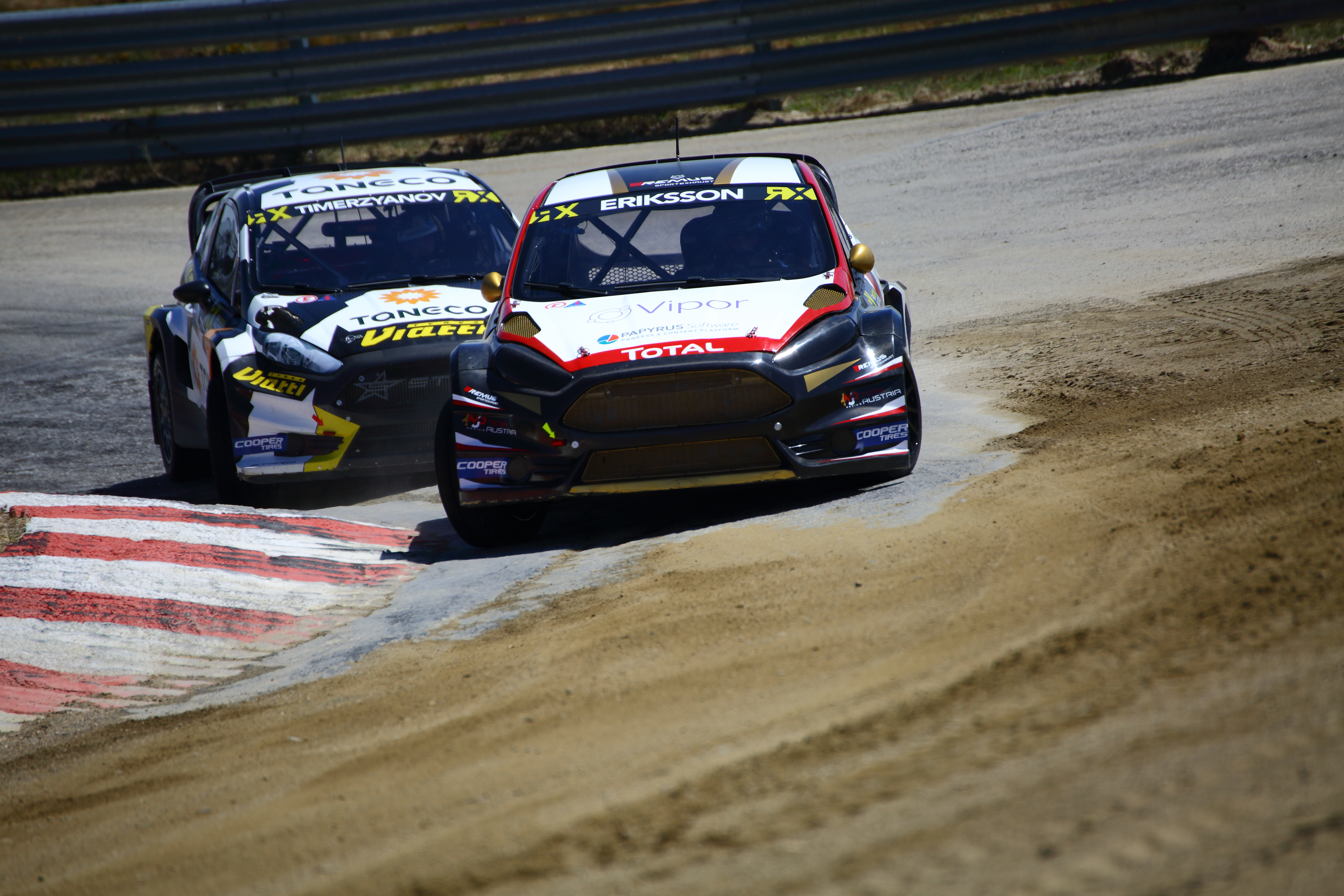
Kevin Eriksson driving a World RX Team Austria Ford Fiesta

MJP Racing Team Austria is an auto racing team founded by Austrian racing driver and entrepreneur Max Pucher. The team has been competing in rallycross since its creation. The team uses Supercar specification Ford Fiesta built by MJP Racing. The cars were former built by Stohl Racing but before the 2016 season started Max Pucher separated his team from Stohl Racing and operates the cars by himself.

== Racing record ==
=== Complete FIA World Rallycross Championship results ===
(key)

==== Supercar ====
| Year | Entrant | Car | No. | Driver | 1 | 2 | 3 | 4 | 5 | 6 | 7 | 8 | 9 | 10 | 11 | 12 | 13 | WRX | Points | Teams | Points |
|---|---|---|---|---|---|---|---|---|---|---|---|---|---|---|---|---|---|---|---|---|---|
| 2015 | World RX Team Austria | Ford Fiesta | 7 | (Austria) Manfred Stohl | POR; 12 | HOC; 14 | BEL; 11 | GBR; 10 | GER; 8 | SWE; 13 | CAN; 10 | NOR; 14 | FRA; 21 | BAR; 13 | TUR; 13 | ITA; 4 | ARG; 9 | 11th | 82 | 7th | 100 |
| 2015 | World RX Team Austria | Ford Fiesta | 31 | (Austria) Max Pucher | POR; 19 | HOC; 22 | BEL; 17 | GBR; 28 | GER; 17 | SWE; 30 | CAN | NOR; 23 | FRA; 23 | BAR; 19 | TUR; 18 | ITA; 18 | ARG | =40th | 0 | 7th | 100 |
| 2015 | World RX Team Austria | Ford Fiesta | 70 | (Austria) Christoph Brugger | POR | HOC | BEL | GBR | GER | SWE | CAN; 17 | NOR; 24 | FRA | BAR | TUR | ITA | ARG | =40th | 0 | 7th | 100 |
| 2015 | World RX Team Austria | Ford Fiesta | 199 | (Latvia) Jānis Baumanis | POR | HOC | BEL | GBR | GER | SWE | CAN | NOR | FRA | BAR | TUR | ITA | ARG; 4 | 20th | 18 | 7th | 100 |
| 2016 | World RX Team Austria | Ford Fiesta | 6 | (Latvia) Jānis Baumanis | POR; 14 | HOC; 8 | BEL; 9 | GBR; 7 | NOR; 8 | SWE; 10 | CAN; 15 | FRA; 26 | BAR; 4 | LAT; 8 | GER; 7 | ARG; 12 | | 10th | 109 | 5th | 226 |
| 2016 | World RX Team Austria | Ford Fiesta | 7 | (Russia) Timur Timerzyanov | POR; 16 | HOC; 17 | BEL; 8 | GBR; 5 | NOR; 6 | SWE; 14 | CAN; 7 | FRA; 30 | BAR; 3 | LAT; 6 | GER; 14 | ARG; 9 | | 8th | 117 | 5th | 226 |
| 2016 | World RX Team Austria | Ford Fiesta | 31 | (Austria) Max Pucher | POR | HOC; DNS | BEL | GBR | NOR | SWE | CAN | FRA | BAR | LAT | GER | ARG | | 38th | 0 | N/A | N/A |
| 2017 | MJP Racing Team Austria | Ford Fiesta ST | 44 | (Germany) Timo Scheider | BAR; 2 | POR; 15 | HOC; 7 | BEL; 11 | GBR | NOR; 12 | SWE; 10 | CAN; 12 | FRA; 9 | LAT; 15 | GER; 15 | RSA; 5 | | 10th | 109 | 5th | 221 |
| 2017 | MJP Racing Team Austria | Ford Fiesta ST | 96 | (Sweden) Kevin Eriksson | BAR; 13 | POR; 14 | HOC; 10 | BEL; 5 | GBR; 9 | NOR; 13 | SWE; 5 | CAN; 4 | FRA; 16 | LAT; 18 | GER; 10 | RSA; 12 | | 11th | 101 | 5th | 221 |
| 2017 | MJP Racing Team Austria | Ford Fiesta ST | 177 | (United Kingdom) Andrew Jordan | BAR | POR | HOC | BEL | GBR; 8 | NOR | SWE | CAN | FRA | LAT | GER | RSA | | 19th | 11 | 5th | 221 |
| 2018 | MJP Racing Team Austria | Ford Fiesta | 31 | (Austria) Max Pucher | BAR | POR | BEL | GBR | NOR; 23 | SWE | CAN | FRA | LAT | USA | GER | RSA | | 31st* | 0* | N/A | N/A |
| 2018 | MJP Racing Team Austria | Ford Fiesta | 32 | (Austria) Alexander Wurz | BAR | POR | BEL | GBR | NOR; 18 | SWE | CAN | FRA | LAT | USA | GER | RSA | | 25th* | 0* | N/A | N/A |
| 2018 | MJP Racing Team Austria | Ford Fiesta | 177 | (United Kingdom) Andrew Jordan | BAR | POR | BEL | GBR; 20 | NOR | SWE | CAN | FRA | LAT | USA | GER | RSA | | 29th* | 0* | N/A | N/A |

^{*} Season still in progress.

=== Complete FIA European Rallycross Championship results ===
(key)

==== Supercar ====
| Year | Entrant | Car | No. | Driver | 1 | 2 | 3 | 4 | 5 | ERX | Points |
|---|---|---|---|---|---|---|---|---|---|---|---|
| 2016 | World RX Team Austria | Ford Fiesta | 31 | (Austria) Max Pucher | BEL; 16 | NOR; 14 | SWE; 14 | BAR | LAT | 18th | 7 |
