= Jānis Baumanis (racing driver) =

Latvian racing driver

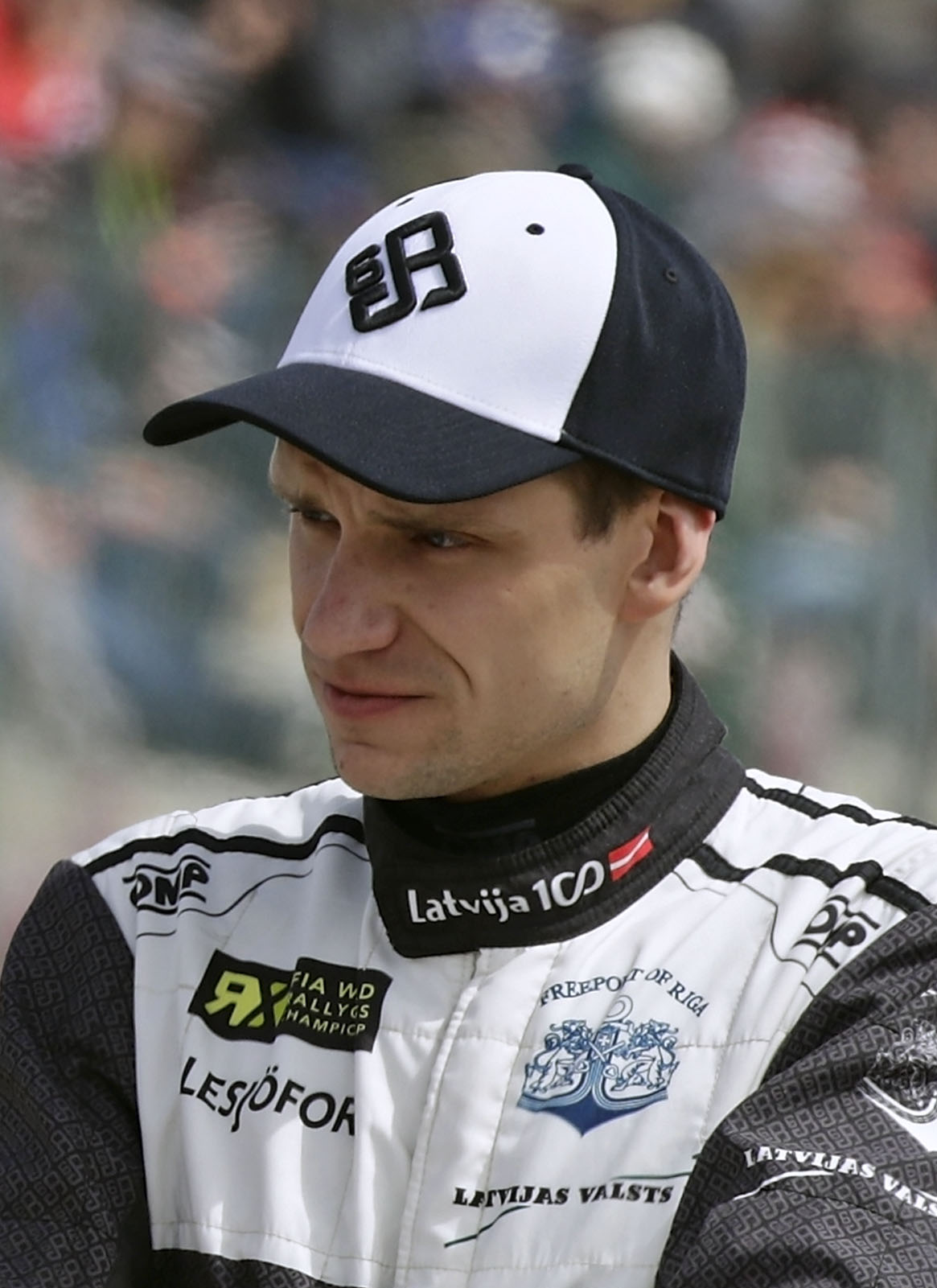
- Baumanis at the 2018 World RX of Portugal
- Nationality: Latvian
- Born: 15 June 1992 (age 34) Mārupe, Latvia

FIA World Rallycross Championship career
- Debut season: 2015
- Current team: STARD
- Car number: 6
- Former teams: Hansen Talent Development, World RX Team Austria
- Starts: 34
- Wins: 0
- Podiums: 0
- Best finish: 6th in 2019
- Finished last season: 6th

FIA ERX Supercar Championship
- Years active: 2015
- Former teams: Hansen Talent Development
- Starts: 1
- Wins: 0
- Podiums: 1
- Best finish: 14th in 2015

FIA ERX Super1600 Championship
- Years active: 2014–2015
- Former teams: Set Promotion
- Starts: 16
- Championships: 1 (2015)
- Wins: 5
- Podiums: 10

Jānis Baumanis is a Latvian racing driver currently participating in the World Rallycross Championship since 2016 and representing STARD team.

== Racing record ==
=== Complete FIA European Rallycross Championship results ===
(key)

==== Super1600 ====
| Year | Entrant | Car | 1 | 2 | 3 | 4 | 5 | 6 | 7 | 8 | 9 | ERX | Points |
|---|---|---|---|---|---|---|---|---|---|---|---|---|---|
| 2014 | Set Promotion | Renault Twingo | POR; 3 | GBR; 17 | NOR; 1 | FIN; 2 | SWE; 7 | BEL; 1 | FRA; 16 | GER; 1 | ITA; 2 | 3rd | 171 |
| 2015 | Set Promotion | Renault Twingo | POR; 3 | BEL; 1 | GER; 5 | SWE; 1 | FRA; 14 | BAR; 3 | ITA; 6 | | | 1st | 158 |

==== Supercar ====
| Year | Entrant | Car | 1 | 2 | 3 | 4 | 5 | ERX | Points |
|---|---|---|---|---|---|---|---|---|---|
| 2015 | Hansen Talent Development | Peugeot 208 | BEL | GER | NOR; 3 | BAR | ITA | 14th | 23 |

=== Complete FIA World Rallycross Championship results ===
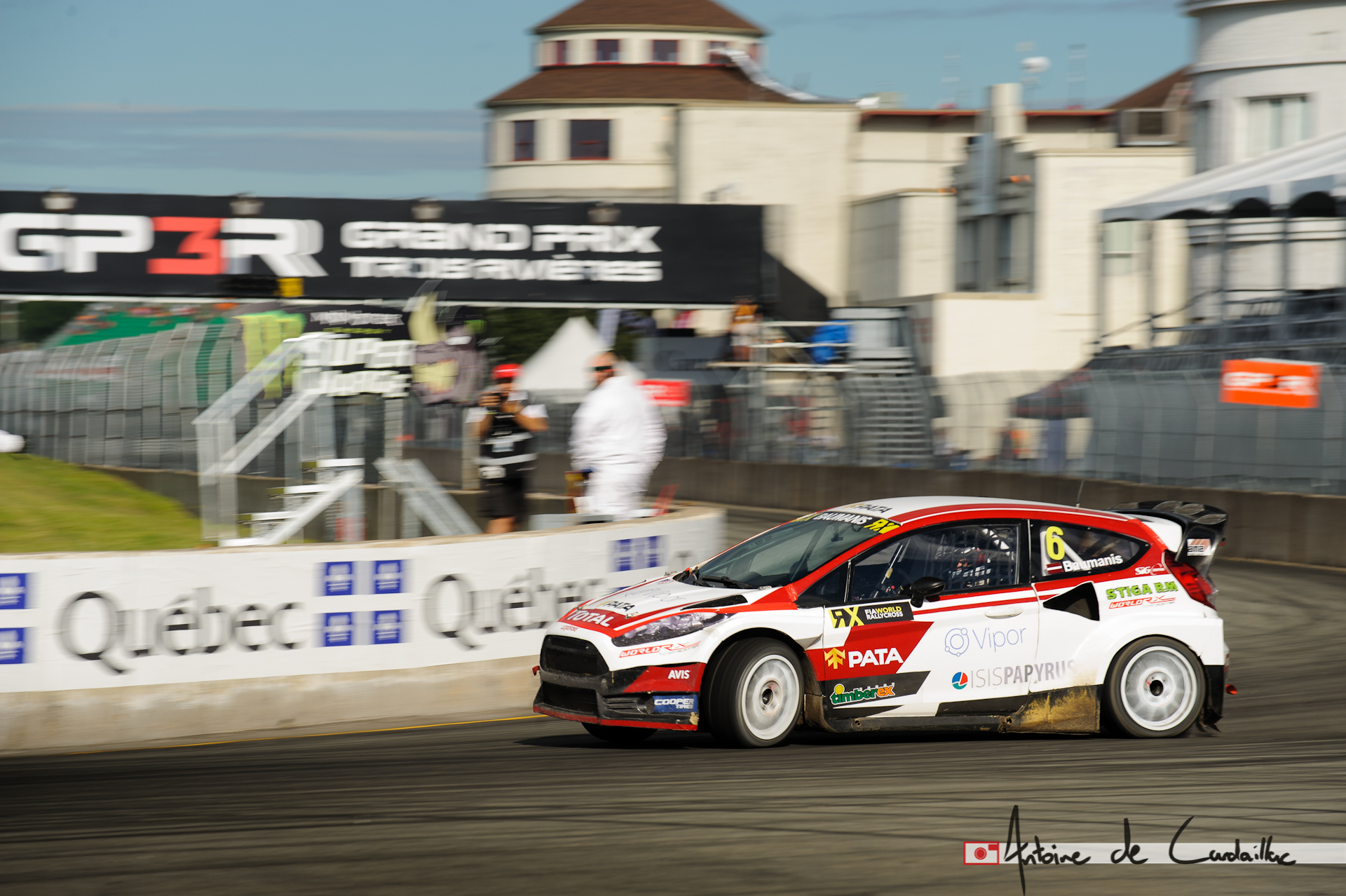
Baumanis at the 2016 World RX of Canada

(key)

==== Supercar ====
| Year | Entrant | Car | 1 | 2 | 3 | 4 | 5 | 6 | 7 | 8 | 9 | 10 | 11 | 12 | 13 | WRX | Points |
|---|---|---|---|---|---|---|---|---|---|---|---|---|---|---|---|---|---|
| 2015 | Hansen Talent Development | Peugeot 208 | POR | HOC | BEL | GBR; 20 | GER | SWE | CAN | NOR | FRA | BAR | TUR; 17 | ITA | | 20th | 18 |
| 2015 | World RX Team Austria | Ford Fiesta | | | | | | | | | | | | | ARG; 4 | 20th | 18 |
| 2016 | World RX Team Austria | Ford Fiesta | POR; 14 | HOC; 8 | BEL; 9 | GBR; 7 | NOR; 10 | SWE; 10 | CAN; 15 | FRA; 26 | BAR; 4 | LAT; 8 | GER; 7 | ARG; 12 | | 10th | 109 |
| 2017 | STARD | Ford Fiesta | BAR; 15 | POR; 7 | HOC; 15 | BEL; 16 | GBR; 10 | NOR; 14 | SWE; 6 | CAN; 8 | FRA; 10 | LAT; 5 | GER; 9 | RSA; 9 | | 12th | 98 |
| 2018 | STARD | Ford Fiesta | BAR; 8 | POR; 11 | BEL; 10 | GBR; 14 | NOR; 12 | SWE; 10 | CAN; 6 | FRA; 13 | LAT; 14 | USA; 11 | GER; 11 | RSA; 9 | | 9th | 98 |
| 2019 | STARD | Ford Fiesta | UAE; 5 | ESP; 6 | BEL; 5 | GBR; 10 | NOR; 3 | SWE; 8 | CAN; 2 | FRA; 11 | LAT; 12 | RSA; 7 | | | | 6th | 137 |

Sporting positions
| Preceded by Sergey Zagumennov | European Rallycross Super1600 Champion; 2015 | Succeeded by Krisztián Szabó |
