= 2016 World RX of Portugal =

Rallycross event

- Round 1 of 13 in the 2016 FIA World Rallycross Championship
- Date: 16–17 April 2016
- Location: Montalegre, Portugal
- Venue: Pista Automóvel de Montalegre

Results
Heat winners
- Heat 1: Johan Kristoffersson; Volkswagen RX Sweden
- Heat 2: (Sweden) Mattias Ekström; EKS RX
- Heat 3: (Norway) Petter Solberg; Petter Solberg World RX Team
- Heat 4: (Sweden) Mattias Ekström; EKS RX
Semi-final winners
- Semi-final 1: Johan Kristoffersson; Volkswagen RX Sweden
- Semi-final 2: (Norway) Petter Solberg; Petter Solberg World RX Team
Final
- First: (Norway) Petter Solberg; Petter Solberg World RX Team
- Second: (Sweden) Robin Larsson; Larsson Jernberg Motorsport
- Third: (Finland) Toomas Heikkinen; EKS RX

World RX layout of Circuito Montalegre

The 2016 World RX of Portugal was the first round of the third season of the FIA World Rallycross Championship. The event was held at the Pista Automovel de Montalegre in Montalegre.

== Heats ==
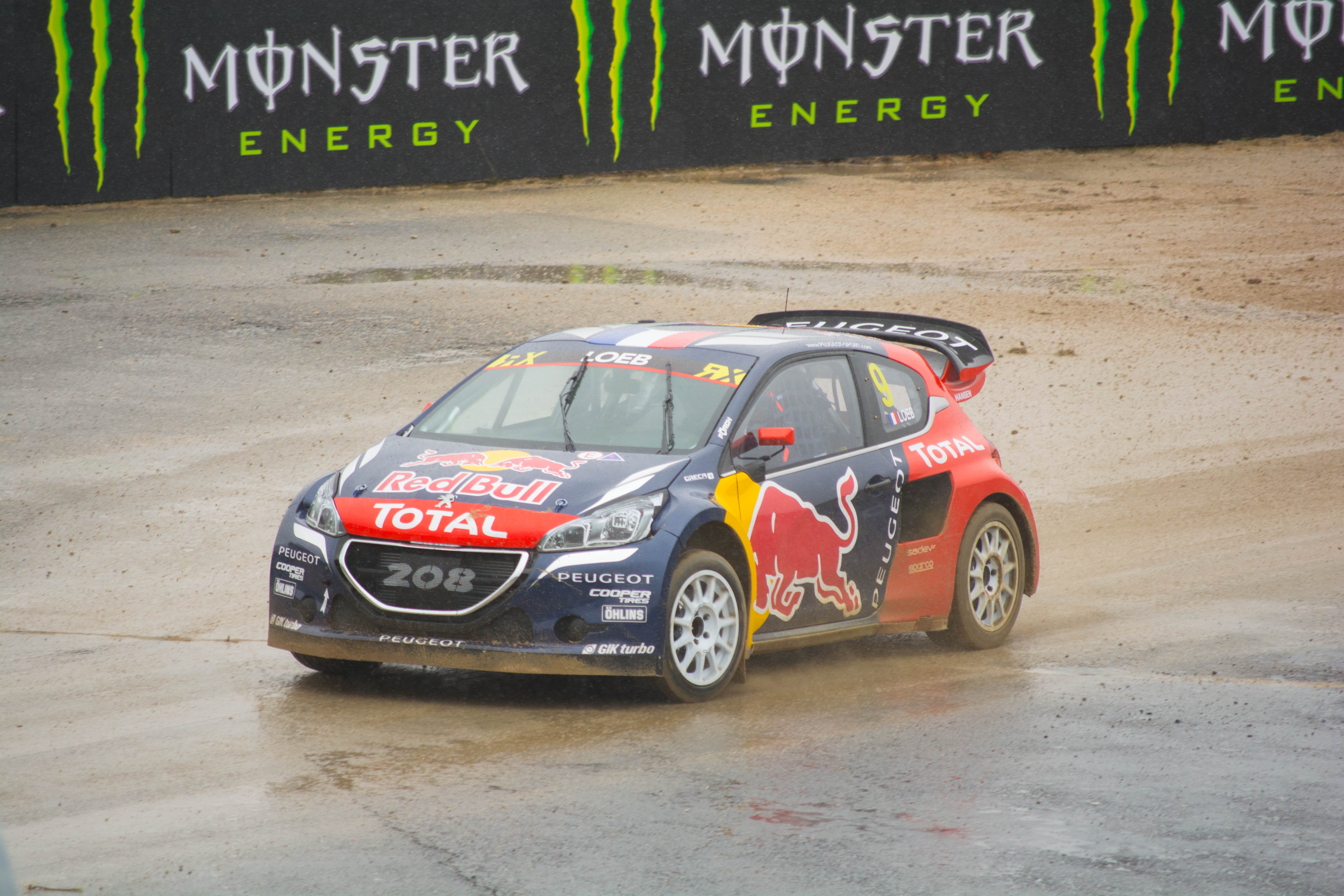
Sébastien Loeb made his début for Team Peugeot-Hansen

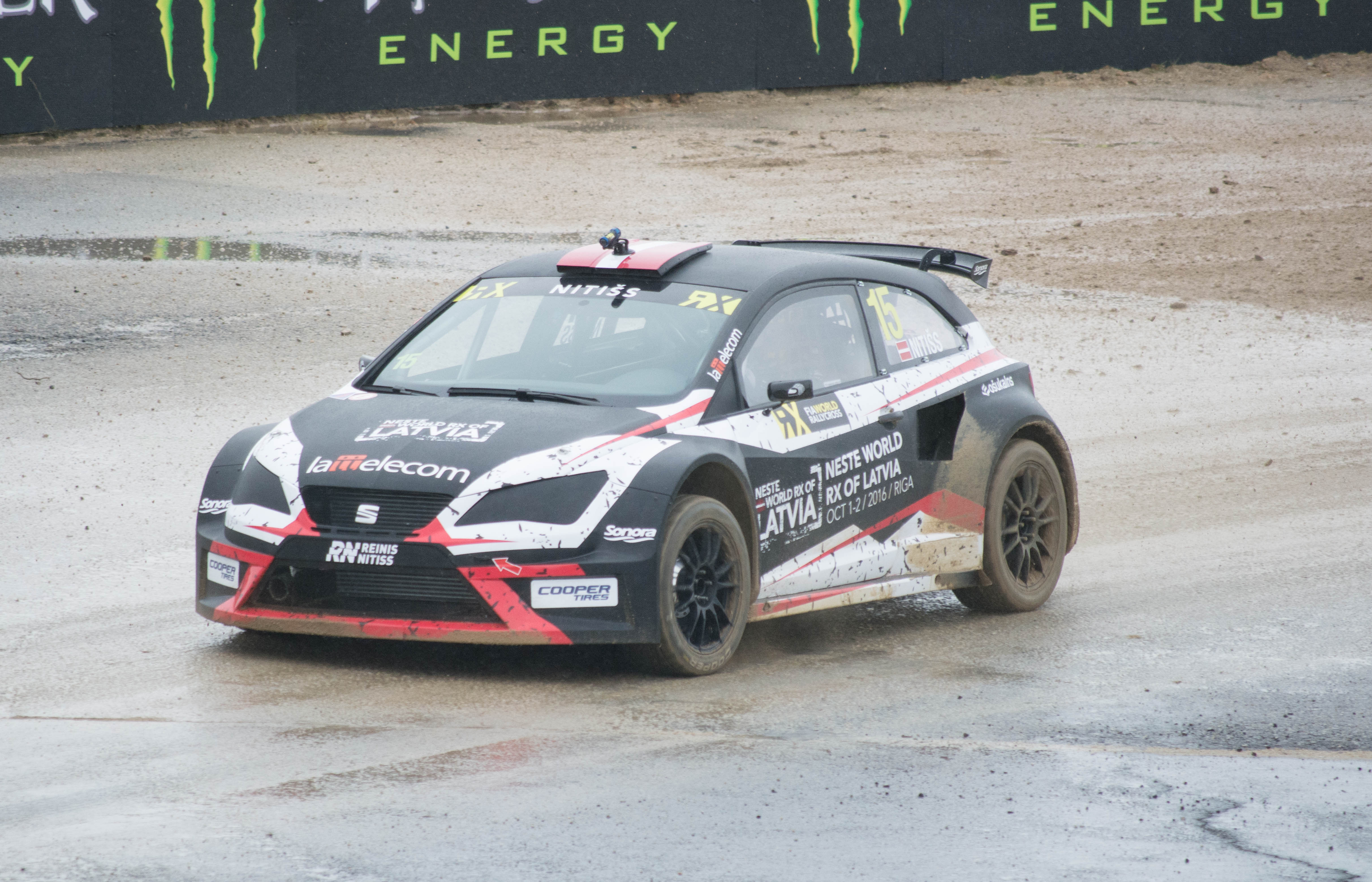
The SEAT Ibiza Supercar also made its debut with the Münnich Motorsport team (Nitišs pictured)

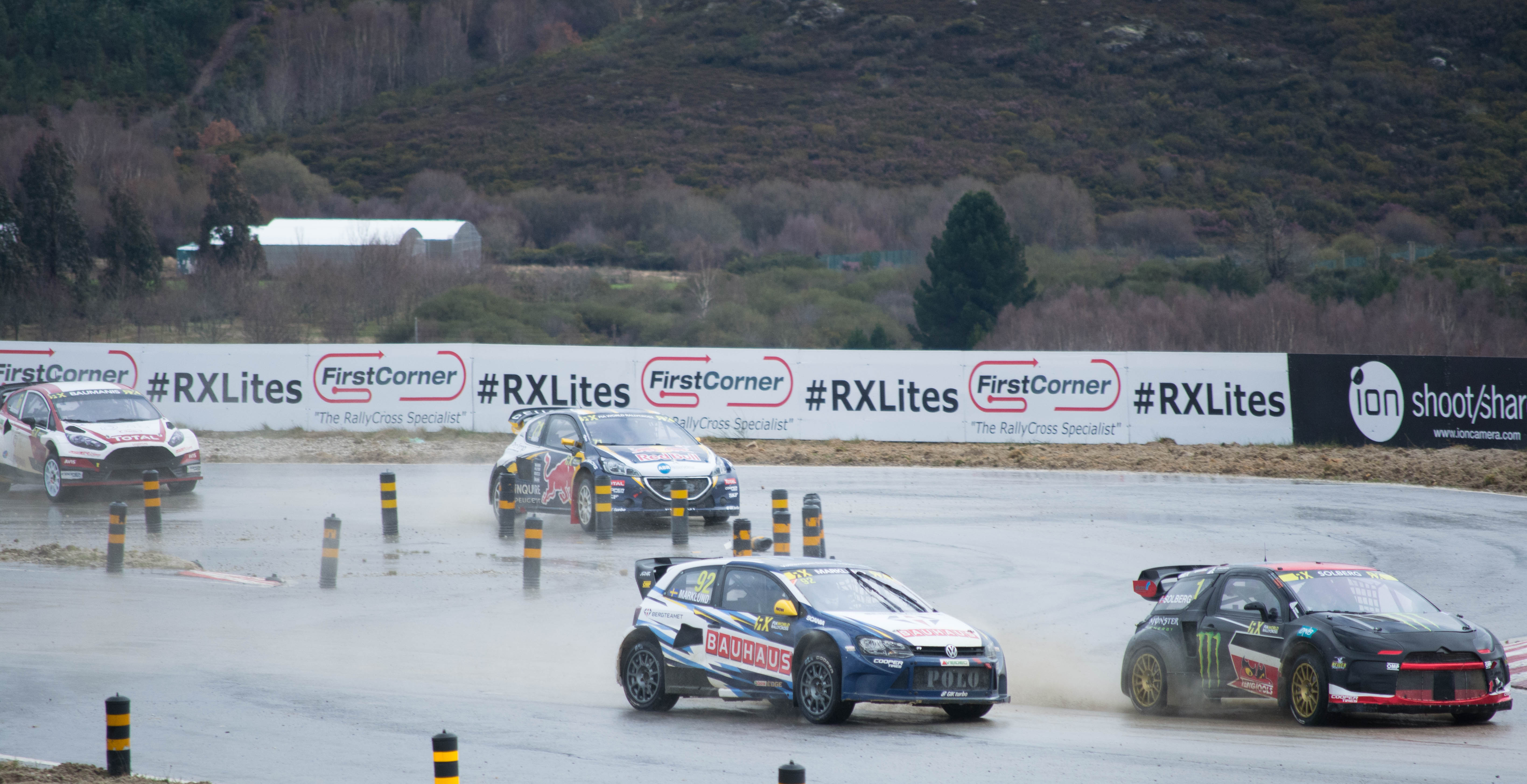
Petter Solberg, Anton Marklund, Kevin Hansen and Jānis Baumanis

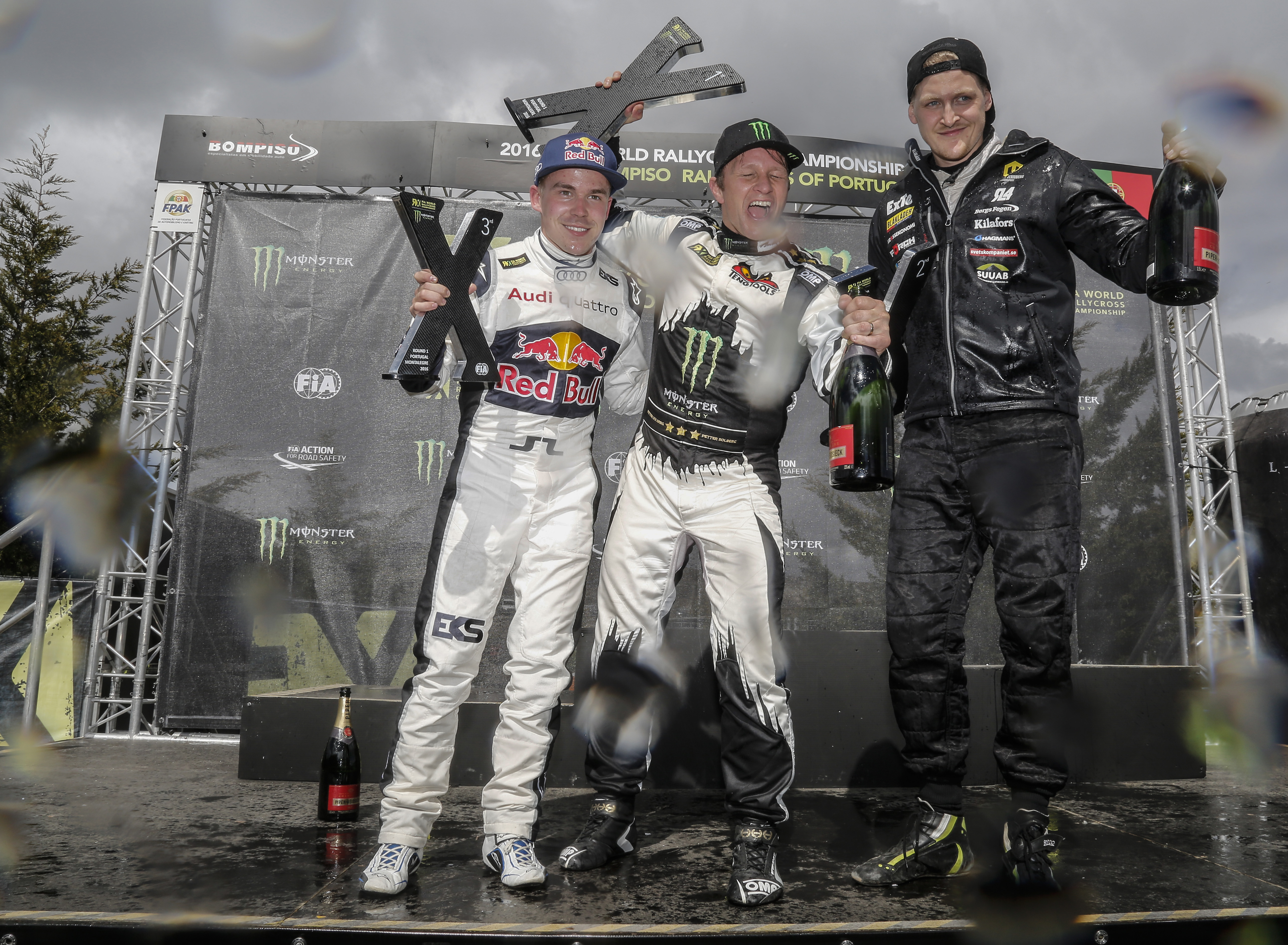
Heikkinen (3rd), Solberg (1st) and Larsson (2nd) celebrating on the podium

Pos.	No.	Driver	Team	Car	Q1	Q2	Q3	Q4	Pts
1	5	(Sweden) Mattias Ekström	EKS RX	Audi S1	2nd	1st	4th	1st	16
2	1	(Norway) Petter Solberg	Petter Solberg World RX Team	Citroën DS3	11th	6th	1st	2nd	15
3	3	(Sweden) Johan Kristoffersson	Volkswagen RX Sweden	Volkswagen Polo	1st	3rd	8th	7th	14
4	13	(Norway) Andreas Bakkerud	Hoonigan Racing Division	Ford Focus RS	4th	4th	3rd	3rd	13
5	4	(Sweden) Robin Larsson	Larsson Jernberg Motorsport	Audi A1	7th	10th	2nd	4th	12
6	57	(Finland) Toomas Heikkinen	EKS RX	Audi S1	3rd	2nd	11th	12th	11
7	9	(France) Sébastien Loeb	Team Peugeot-Hansen	Peugeot 208	5th	5th	6th	9th	10
8	96	(Sweden) Kevin Eriksson	Olsbergs MSE	Ford Fiesta ST	9th	7th	9th	8th	9
9	21	(Sweden) Timmy Hansen	Team Peugeot-Hansen	Peugeot 208	8th	14th	7th	6th	8
10	17	(France) Davy Jeanney	Peugeot Hansen Academy	Peugeot 208	15th	13th	5th	5th	7
11	33	(United Kingdom) Liam Doran	JRM Racing	BMW MINI Countryman	6th	17th	12th	10th	6
12	92	(Sweden) Anton Marklund	Volkswagen RX Sweden	Volkswagen Polo	12th	9th	14th	15th	5
13	71	(Sweden) Kevin Hansen	Peugeot Hansen Academy	Peugeot 208	14th	8th	13th	16th	4
14	6	(Latvia) Jānis Baumanis	World RX Team Austria	Ford Fiesta	13th	11th	16th	14th	3
15	15	(Latvia) Reinis Nitišs	All-Inkl.com Münnich Motorsport	SEAT Ibiza	10th	12th	15th	17th	2
16	7	(Russia) Timur Timerzyanov	World RX Team Austria	Ford Fiesta	20th	18th	10th	11th	1
17	68	(Finland) Niclas Grönholm	Olsbergs MSE	Ford Fiesta ST	16th	15th	20th	13th	
18	43	(United States) Ken Block	Hoonigan Racing Division	Ford Focus RS	19th	16th	19th	18th	
19	55	(Germany) René Münnich	All-Inkl.com Münnich Motorsport	SEAT Ibiza	17th	20th	17th	19th	
20	41	(Portugal) Joaquim Santos	Bompiso Racing Team	Ford Focus	18th	19th	18th	20th	

== Semi-finals ==
=== Semi-final 1 ===
Pos.	No.	Driver	Team	Time	Pts
1	3	(Sweden) Johan Kristoffersson	Volkswagen RX Sweden	4:09.669	6
2	9	(France) Sébastien Loeb	Team Peugeot-Hansen	+0.478	5
3	4	(Sweden) Robin Larsson	Larsson Jernberg Motorsport	+1.358	4
4	10	(Sweden) Mattias Ekström	EKS RX	+1.959	3
5	33	(United Kingdom) Liam Doran	JRM Racing	+2.413	2
6	21	(Sweden) Timmy Hansen	Team Peugeot-Hansen	DNF	1

=== Semi-final 2 ===
Pos.	No.	Driver	Team	Time	Pts
1	1	(Norway) Petter Solberg	Petter Solberg World RX Team	4:07.712	6
2	57	(Finland) Toomas Heikkinen	EKS RX	+2.353	5
3	13	(Norway) Andreas Bakkerud	Hoonigan Racing Division	+5.135	4
4	96	(Sweden) Kevin Eriksson	Olsbergs MSE	+5.386	3
5	92	(Sweden) Anton Marklund	Volkswagen RX Sweden	+6.254	2
6	17	(France) Davy Jeanney	Peugeot Hansen Academy	+5.753	1

== Final ==
Pos.	No.	Driver	Team	Time	Pts
1	1	(Norway) Petter Solberg	Petter Solberg World RX Team	4:03.992	8
2	4	(Sweden) Robin Larsson	Larsson Jernberg Motorsport	+0.847	5
3	57	(Finland) Toomas Heikkinen	EKS RX	+2.360	4
4	13	(Norway) Andreas Bakkerud	Hoonigan Racing Division	+3.775	3
5	9	(France) Sébastien Loeb	Team Peugeot-Hansen	+25.306	2
6	3	(Sweden) Johan Kristoffersson	Volkswagen RX Sweden	+1:31.992	1

== Championship standings after the event ==
Pos.	Driver	Pts	Gap
1	(Norway) Petter Solberg	29	
2	(Sweden) Robin Larsson	21	+8
2	(Sweden) Johan Kristoffersson	21	+8
4	(Finland) Toomas Heikkinen	20	+9
4	(Norway) Andreas Bakkerud	20	+9

Previous race: 2015 World RX of Argentina	FIA World Rallycross Championship; 2016 season	Next race: 2016 World RX of Hockenheim
Previous race: 2015 World RX of Portugal	World RX of Portugal	Next race: 2017 World RX of Portugal
