= World RX of Hockenheim =

Rallycross event held at the Hockenheimring

The World RX of Hockenheim was a Rallycross event held at the Hockenheimring in Baden-Württemberg, Germany for the FIA World Rallycross Championship. The event made its debut in the 2015 season.

World RX layout of Hockenheimring

== Past winners ==
| Year | Heat 1 winner | Heat 2 winner | Heat 3 winner | Heat 4 winner | Semi-Final 1 winner | Semi-Final 2 winner | Final winner |
|---|---|---|---|---|---|---|---|
| 2015 | (Sweden) Johan Kristoffersson | (United Kingdom) Liam Doran | (Norway) Petter Solberg | (Norway) Petter Solberg | (Norway) Petter Solberg | (Latvia) Reinis Nitišs | (Norway) Petter Solberg |
| Year | Qualifying 1 winner | Qualifying 2 winner | Qualifying 3 winner | Qualifying 4 winner | Semi-Final 1 winner | Semi-Final 2 winner | Final winner |
| 2016 | (Sweden) Mattias Ekström | (Sweden) Johan Kristoffersson | (Norway) Petter Solberg | (Finland) Toomas Heikkinen | (Finland) Toomas Heikkinen | (United Kingdom) Liam Doran | (Sweden) Mattias Ekström |
| 2017 | (France) Sébastien Loeb | (France) Sébastien Loeb | (Norway) Petter Solberg | (Sweden) Timmy Hansen | (Sweden) Johan Kristoffersson | (Sweden) Mattias Ekström | (Sweden) Mattias Ekström |
