= 2017 World RX of Belgium =

Rallycross event

- Round 4 of 12 in the 2017 FIA World Rallycross Championship
- Date: 13–14 May 2017
- Location: Mettet, Wallonia
- Venue: Circuit Jules Tacheny Mettet

Results
Heat winners
- Heat 1: (Norway) Petter Solberg; PSRX Volkswagen Sweden
- Heat 2: Johan Kristoffersson; PSRX Volkswagen Sweden
- Heat 3: Johan Kristoffersson; PSRX Volkswagen Sweden
- Heat 4: Johan Kristoffersson; PSRX Volkswagen Sweden
Semi-final winners
- Semi-final 1: (Sweden) Timmy Hansen; Team Peugeot-Hansen
- Semi-final 2: (Norway) Petter Solberg; PSRX Volkswagen Sweden
Final
- First: Johan Kristoffersson; PSRX Volkswagen Sweden
- Second: (Sweden) Timmy Hansen; Team Peugeot-Hansen
- Third: (Norway) Petter Solberg; PSRX Volkswagen Sweden

World RX layout of Circuit Jules Tacheny Mettet

The 2017 World RX of Belgium was the fourth round of the fourth season of the FIA World Rallycross Championship. The event was held at the Circuit Jules Tacheny Mettet in Mettet, Wallonia and also played host to the third round of the 2017 FIA European Rallycross Championship. It also hosted the first round of the 2017 RX2 International Series, the support category of the World Rallycross Championship.

== Supercar ==
=== Heats ===
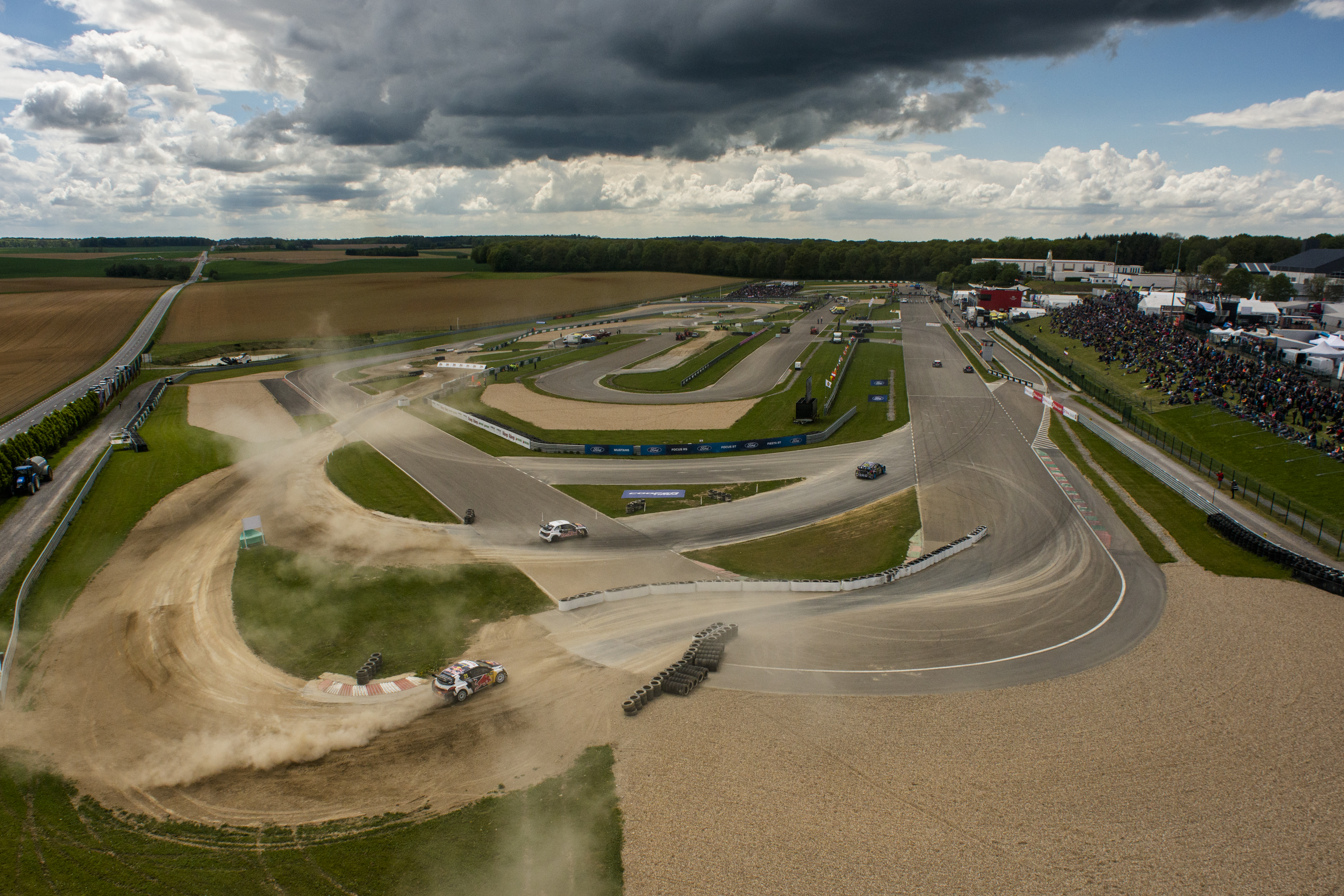
Above the Mettet circuit split

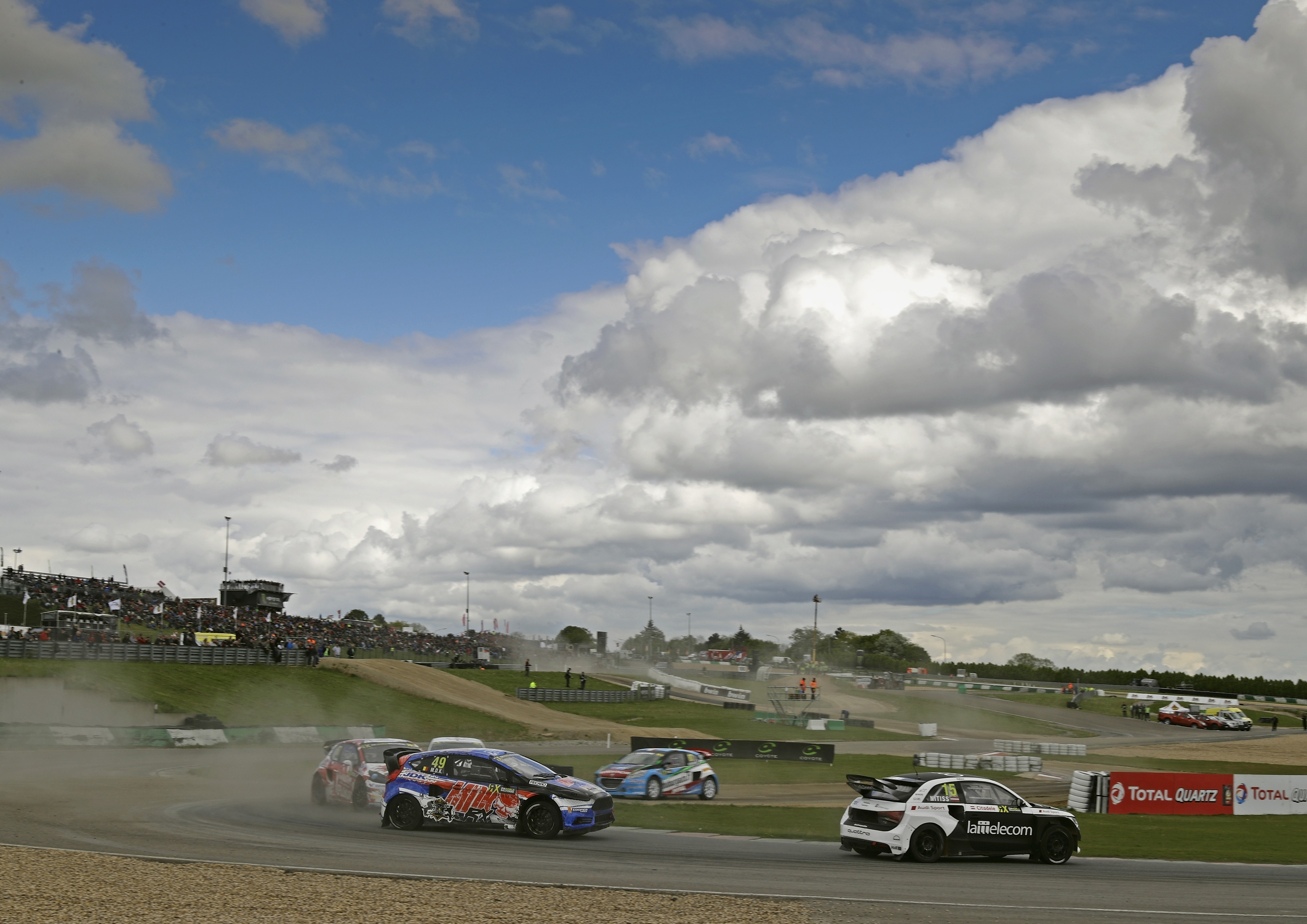
Reinis Nitišs leads "M.D.K.", Duval, Kaczmarski and Dubourg

Pos.	No.	Driver	Team	Car	Q1	Q2	Q3	Q4	Pts
1	3	(Sweden) Johan Kristoffersson	PSRX Volkswagen Sweden	Volkswagen Polo GTI	2nd	1st	1st	1st	16
2	11	(Norway) Petter Solberg	PSRX Volkswagen Sweden	Volkswagen Polo GTI	1st	2nd	4th	6th	15
3	21	(Sweden) Timmy Hansen	Team Peugeot-Hansen	Peugeot 208	3rd	13th	5th	3rd	14
4	13	(Norway) Andreas Bakkerud	Hoonigan Racing Division	Ford Focus RS	4th	15th	8th	2nd	13
5	9	(France) Sébastien Loeb	Team Peugeot-Hansen	Peugeot 208	6th	3rd	3rd	16th	12
6	43	(United States) Ken Block	Hoonigan Racing Division	Ford Focus RS	11th	4th	9th	4th	11
7	57	(Finland) Toomas Heikkinen	EKS RX	Audi S1	9th	10th	6th	7th	10
8	1	(Sweden) Mattias Ekström	EKS RX	Audi S1	5th	11th	2nd	21st	9
9	96	(Sweden) Kevin Eriksson	MJP Racing Team Austria	Ford Fiesta	7th	6th	20th	5th	8
10	7	(Russia) Timur Timerzyanov	STARD	Ford Fiesta	10th	7th	14th	8th	7
11	44	(Germany) Timo Scheider	MJP Racing Team Austria	Ford Fiesta	13th	12th	7th	9th	6
12	68	(Finland) Niclas Grönholm	GRX	Ford Fiesta	15th	8th	11h	12th	5
13	15	(Latvia) Reinis Nitišs	EKS RX	Audi S1	16th	5th	18th	11th	4
14	100	(United Kingdom) Guy Wilks	LOCO World RX Team	Volkswagen Polo	12th	21st	13th	10th	3
15	67	(Belgium) François Duval	Albatec Racing	Peugeot 208	17th	14th	12th	15th	2
16	6	(Latvia) Jānis Baumanis	STARD	Ford Fiesta	14th	22nd	10th	13th	1
17	49	(Belgium) "M.D.K."	M.D.K.	Ford Fiesta	18th	16th	17th	17th	
18	87	(France) Jean-Baptiste Dubourg	DA Racing	Peugeot 208	20th	19th	15th	14th	
19	69	(Poland) Martin Kaczmarski	Martin Kaczmarski	Ford Fiesta	19th	17th	16th	18th	
20	36	(France) Guerlain Chicherit	Guerlain Chicherit	Renault Clio	21st	18th	22nd	20th	
21	71	(Sweden) Kevin Hansen	Team Peugeot-Hansen	Peugeot 208	8th	9th	DNF	DNS	
22	66	(France) Grégoire Demoustier	DA Racing	Peugeot 208	23rd	24th	21st	19th	
23	102	(Hungary) Tamás Kárai	Kárai Motorsport Sportegyesület	Audi A1	24th	23rd	19th	DNF	
24	10	(Hungary) "Csucsu"	Speedy Motorsport	Kia Rio	22nd	20th	23rd	DNS	

=== Semi-finals ===
Semi-final 1

Pos.	No.	Driver	Team	Time	Pts
1	21	(Sweden) Timmy Hansen	Team Peugeot-Hansen	4:04.695	6
2	3	(Sweden) Johan Kristoffersson	PSRX Volkswagen Sweden	+1.303	5
3	96	(Sweden) Kevin Eriksson	MJP Racing Team Austria	+11.476	4
4	57	(Finland) Toomas Heikkinen	EKS RX	+11.769	3
5	44	(Germany) Timo Scheider	MJP Racing Team Austria	+15.118	2
6	9	(France) Sébastien Loeb	Team Peugeot-Hansen	+35.780	1

Semi-final 2

Pos.	No.	Driver	Team	Time	Pts
1	11	(Norway) Petter Solberg	PSRX Volkswagen Sweden	4:02.467	6
2	13	(Norway) Andreas Bakkerud	Hoonigan Racing Division	+0.757	5
3	1	(Sweden) Mattias Ekström	EKS RX	+2.108	4
4	7	(Russia) Timur Timerzyanov	STARD	+6.311	3
5	68	(Finland) Niclas Grönholm	GRX	+10.292	2
6	43	(United States) Ken Block	Hoonigan Racing Division	DNF	1

=== Final ===
Pos.	No.	Driver	Team	Time	Pts
1	3	(Sweden) Johan Kristoffersson	PSRX Volkswagen Sweden	4:02.316	8
2	21	(Sweden) Timmy Hansen	Team Peugeot-Hansen	+0.924	5
3	11	(Norway) Petter Solberg	PSRX Volkswagen Sweden	+0.935	3
4	1	(Sweden) Mattias Ekström	EKS RX	+3.057	4
5	96	(Sweden) Kevin Eriksson	MJP Racing Team Austria	+11.269	2
6	13	(Norway) Andreas Bakkerud	Hoonigan Racing Division	DNF	1

== RX2 International Series ==
=== Heats ===
Pos.	No.	Driver	Team	Q1	Q2	Q3	Q4	Pts
1	52	(Sweden) Simon Olofsson	Simon Olofsson	1st	1st	2nd	15th	16
2	40	(United Kingdom) Dan Rooke	Dan Rooke	9th	2nd	1st	5th	15
3	55	(Latvia) Vasily Gryazin	Sports Racing Technologies	13th	3rd	7th	2nd	14
4	12	(Sweden) Anders Michalak	Anders Michalak	5th	11th	8th	3rd	13
5	9	(Norway) Glenn Haug	Glenn Haug	2nd	14th	10th	4th	12
6	13	(France) Cyril Raymond	Olsbergs MSE	6th	DNF	15th	1st	11
7	96	(Belgium) Guillaume De Ridder	Guillaume De Ridder	17th	4th	6th	7th	10
8	11	(United States) Tanner Whitten	Olsbergs MSE	11th	12th	3rd	10th	9
9	69	(Norway) Sondre Evjen	JC Raceteknik	4th	13th	5th	13th	8
10	56	(Norway) Thomas Holmen	Bard Holmen	3rd	10th	11th	14th	7
11	66	(Sweden) William Nilsson	JC Raceteknik	12th	9th	4th	16th	6
12	33	(Kenya) Tejas Hirani	Olsbergs MSE	14th	8th	9th	11th	5
13	58	(Sweden) Santosh Berggren	A. Berggrens Bilservice Floby	15th	7th	DNF	6th	4
14	51	(Sweden) Sandra Hultgren	Sandra Hultgren	7th	DNF	13th	8th	3
15	19	(Sweden) Andreas Bäckman	Olsbergs MSE	16th	6th	DNF	9th	2
16	26	(Sweden) Jessica Bäckman	Olsbergs MSE	10th	15th	12th	12th	1
17	8	(Norway) Simon Wågø Syversen	Set Promotion	8th	5th	14th	DNS	

=== Semi-finals ===
Semi-final 1

Pos.	No.	Driver	Team	Time	Pts
1	52	(Sweden) Simon Olofsson	Simon Olofsson	4:28.957	6
2	9	(Norway) Glenn Haug	Glenn Haug	+4.041	5
3	66	(Sweden) William Nilsson	JC Raceteknik	+8.042	4
4	96	(Belgium) Guillaume De Ridder	Guillaume De Ridder	+9.923	3
5	69	(Norway) Sondre Evjen	JC Raceteknik	+11.018	2
6	12	(Latvia) Vasily Gryazin	Sports Racing Technologies	+22.628	1

Semi-final 2

Pos.	No.	Driver	Team	Time/retired	Pts
1	13	(France) Cyril Raymond	Olsbergs MSE	4:28.337	6
2	40	(United Kingdom) Dan Rooke	Dan Rooke	+1.605	5
3	11	(United States) Tanner Whitten	Olsbergs MSE	+9.797	4
4	33	(Kenya) Tejas Hirani	Olsbergs MSE	+12.719	3
5	56	(Norway) Thomas Holmen]	Bard Holmen	+20.476	2
6	12	(Sweden) Anders Michalak	Anders Michalak	+38.040	1

=== Final ===
Pos.	No.	Driver	Team	Time/retired	Pts
1	13	(France) Cyril Raymond	Olsbergs MSE	4:25.169	8
2	40	(United Kingdom) Dan Rooke	Dan Rooke	+1.394	5
3	11	(United States) Tanner Whitten	Olsbergs MSE	+5.306	4
4	9	(Norway) Glenn Haug	Glenn Haug	+17.966	3
5	52	(Sweden) Simon Olofsson	Simon Olofsson	DNF	2
6	66	(Sweden) William Nilsson	JC Raceteknik	DNF	1

== Standings after the event ==
Supercar standings

Pos	Driver	Pts	Gap
1	(Sweden) Mattias Ekström	101	
2	(Sweden) Johan Kristoffersson	98	+3
3	(Norway) Petter Solberg	87	+14
4	(Sweden) Timmy Hansen	72	+29
5	(France) Sébastien Loeb	62	+39

RX2 standings

Pos	Driver	Pts	Gap
1	(France) Cyril Raymond	25	
2	(United Kingdom) Dan Rooke	25	0
3	(Sweden) Simon Olofsson	24	+1
4	(Norway) Glenn Haug	20	+5
5	(United States) Tanner Whitten	17	+8

- Note: Only the top five positions are included.

Previous race: 2017 World RX of Hockenheim	FIA World Rallycross Championship; 2017 season	Next race: 2017 World RX of Great Britain
Previous race: 2016 World RX of Belgium	World RX of Belgium	Next race: 2018 World RX of Belgium
