= 2017 World RX of Barcelona =

Rallycross event

- Round 1 of 12 in the 2017 FIA World Rallycross Championship
- Date: 1–2 April 2017
- Location: Montmeló, Catalonia
- Venue: Circuit de Barcelona-Catalunya

Results
Heat winners
- Heat 1: Johan Kristoffersson; PSRX Volkswagen Sweden
- Heat 2: (Finland) Toomas Heikkinen; EKS RX
- Heat 3: (Sweden) Mattias Ekström; EKS RX
- Heat 4: (Norway) Andreas Bakkerud; Hoonigan Racing Division
Semi-final winners
- Semi-final 1: Johan Kristoffersson; PSRX Volkswagen Sweden
- Semi-final 2: (Sweden) Mattias Ekström; EKS RX
Final
- First: (Sweden) Mattias Ekström; EKS RX
- Second: (Germany) Timo Scheider; MJP Racing Team Austria
- Third: (Norway) Andreas Bakkerud; Hoonigan Racing Division

Rallycross layout of the Circuit de Catalunya

The 2017 World RX of Barcelona was the first round of the fourth season of the FIA World Rallycross Championship. The event was held at the Circuit de Barcelona-Catalunya in Montmeló, Catalonia.

== Supercar ==
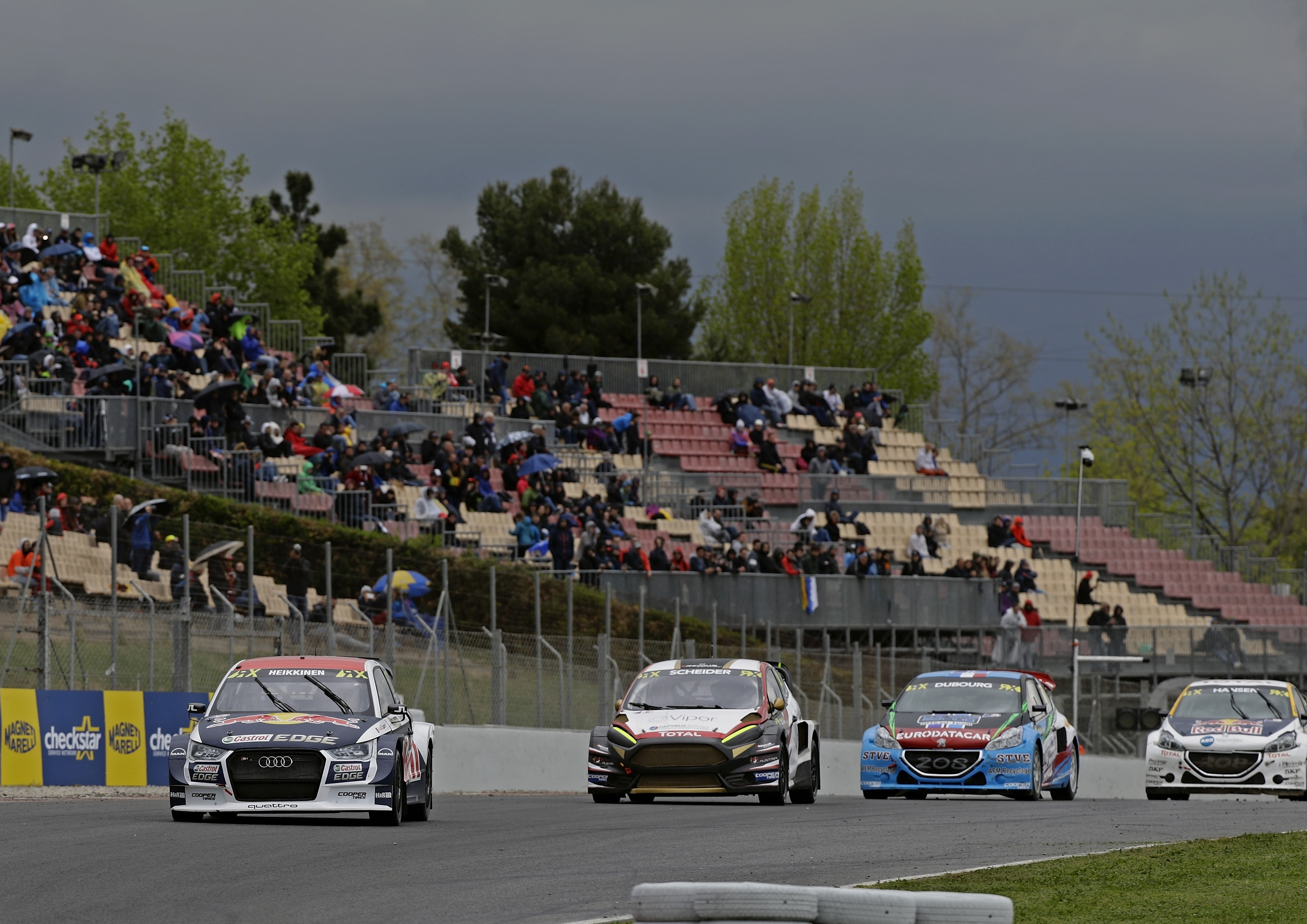
Toomas Heikkinen leads Timo Scheider, JB Dubourg and Kevin Hansen

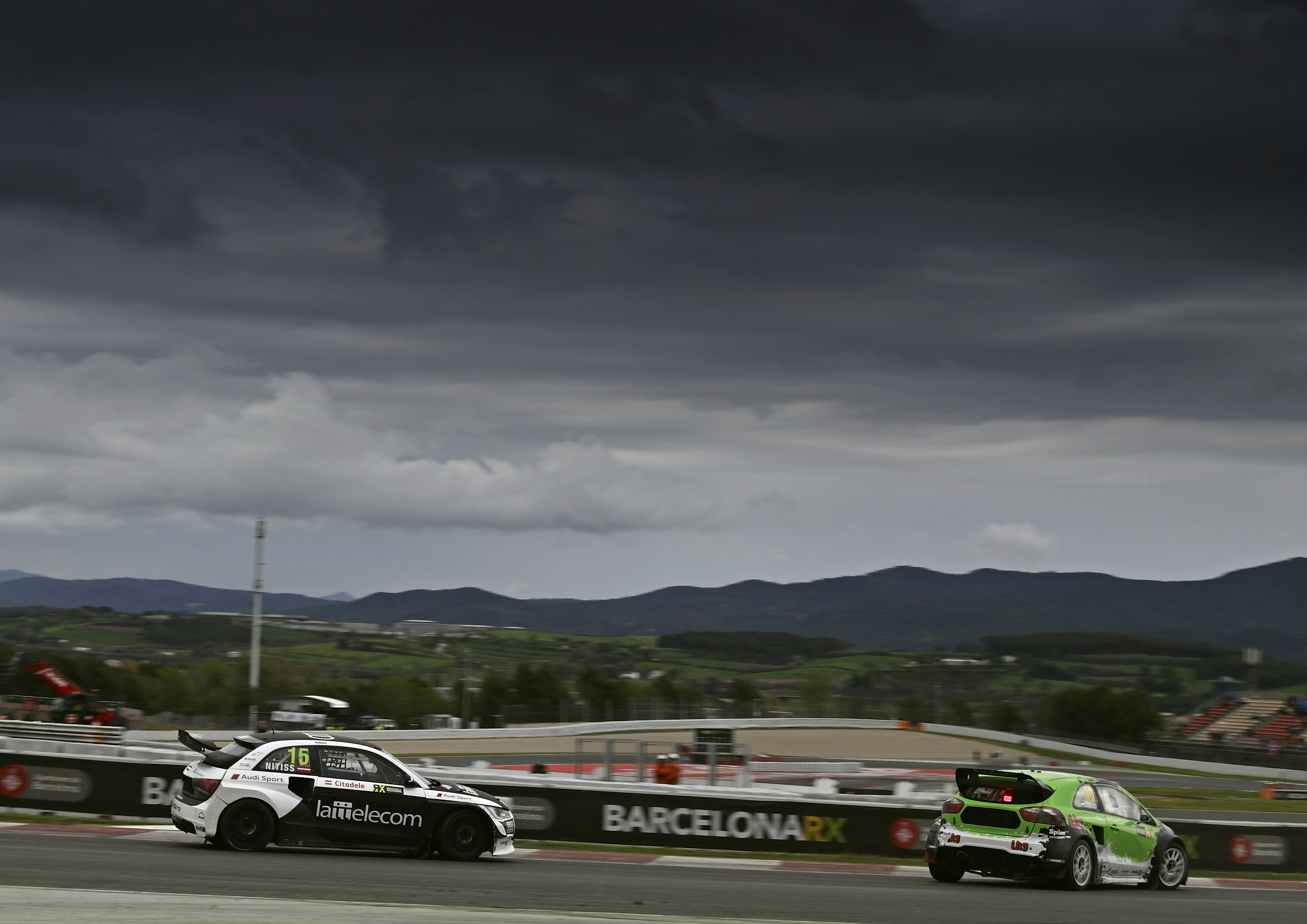
World Championship debutant "Csucsu" is chased by Reinis Nitišs

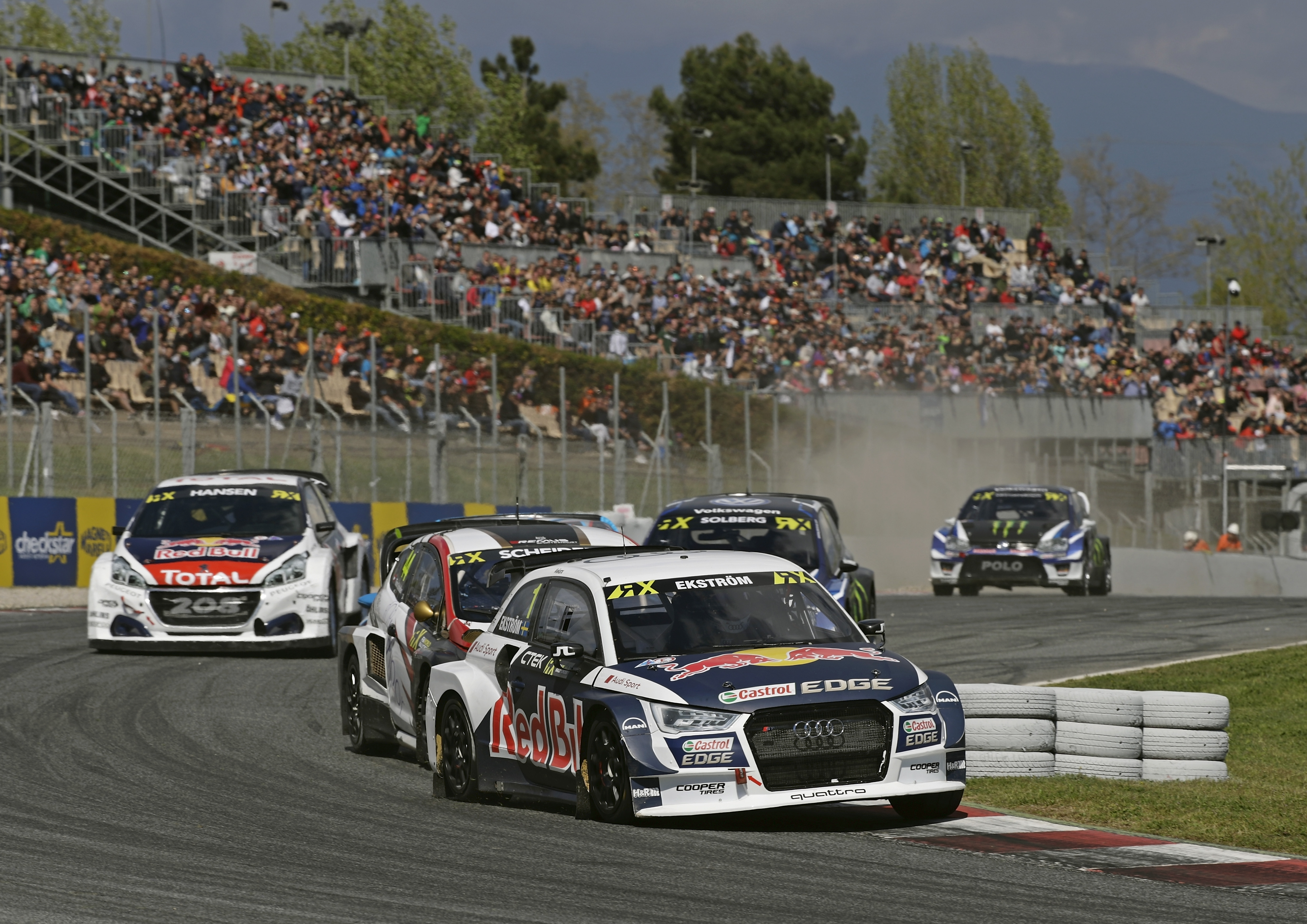
Reigning World Champion Mattias Ekström on his way to winning the final

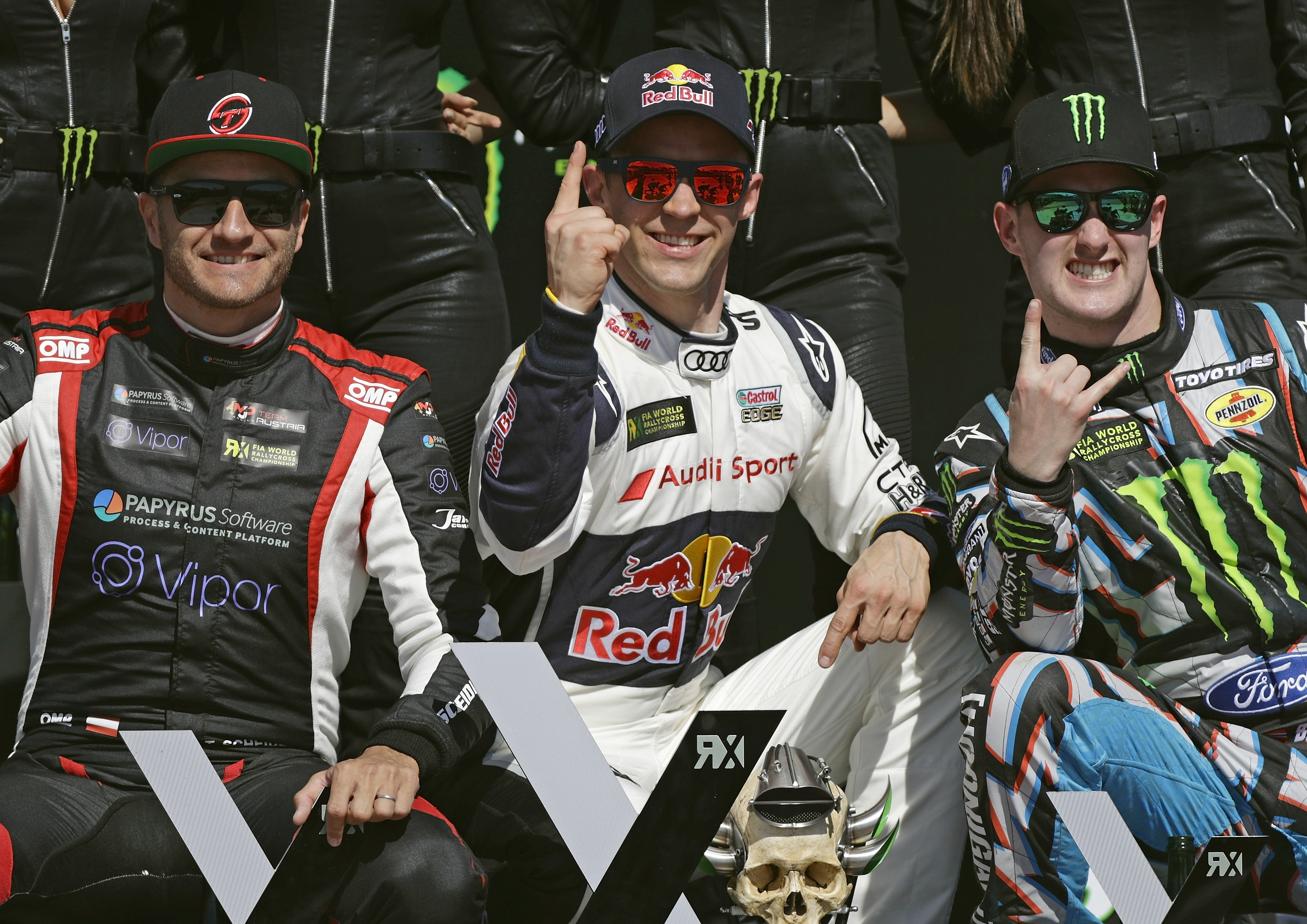
Event podium consisting of Scheider (2nd), Ekström (1st) and Bakkerud (3rd)

=== Heats ===
Pos.	No.	Driver	Team	Car	Q1	Q2	Q3	Q4	Pts
1	44	(Germany) Timo Scheider	MJP Racing Team Austria	Ford Fiesta	12th	2nd	2nd	5th	16
2	1	(Sweden) Mattias Ekström	EKS RX	Audi S1	4th	15th	1st	4th	15
3	3	(Sweden) Johan Kristoffersson	PSRX Volkswagen Sweden	Volkswagen Polo GTI	1st	17th	6th	3rd	14
4	13	(Norway) Andreas Bakkerud	Hoonigan Racing Division	Ford Focus RS	5th	20th	3rd	1st	13
5	11	(Norway) Petter Solberg	PSRX Volkswagen Sweden	Volkswagen Polo GTI	3rd	18th	4th	2nd	12
6	21	(Sweden) Timmy Hansen	Team Peugeot-Hansen	Peugeot 208	6th	10th	5th	7th	11
7	57	(Finland) Toomas Heikkinen	EKS RX	Audi S1	14th	1st	10th	16th	10
8	100	(United Kingdom) Guy Wilks	LOCO Energy RX Team	Volkswagen Polo	10th	13th	7th	10th	9
9	43	(United States) Ken Block	Hoonigan Racing Division	Ford Focus RS	2nd	19th	11th	11th	8
10	15	(Latvia) Reinis Nitišs	EKS RX	Audi S1	17th	3rd	9th	12th	7
11	71	(Sweden) Kevin Hansen	Team Peugeot-Hansen	Peugeot 208	11th	5th	12th	13th	6
12	87	(France) Jean-Baptiste Dubourg	DA Racing	Peugeot 208	13th	12th	13th	15th	5
13	96	(Sweden) Kevin Eriksson	MJP Racing Team Austria	Ford Fiesta	8th	14th	15th	9th	4
14	9	(France) Sébastien Loeb	Team Peugeot-Hansen	Peugeot 208	9th	9th	21st	8th	3
15	6	(Latvia) Jānis Baumanis	STARD	Ford Fiesta	7th	11th	19th	14th	2
16	10	(Hungary) "Csucsu"	Speedy Motorsport	Kia Rio	18th	6th	14th	18th	1
17	68	(Finland) Niclas Grönholm	GRX	Ford Fiesta	19th	8th	16th	17th	
18	84	(France) "Knapick"	Hervé "Knapick" Lemonnier	Citroën DS3	16th	7th	18th	19th	
19	66	(France) Grégoire Demoustier	DA Racing	Peugeot 208	20th	12th	20th	20th	
20	7	(Russia) Timur Timerzyanov	STARD	Ford Fiesta	15th	21st	8th	6th	
21	36	(France) Guerlain Chicherit	Fors Performance	Renault Clio	21st	16th	17th	21st	

=== Semi-finals ===
Semi-final 1

Pos.	No.	Driver	Team	Time	Pts
1	3	(Sweden) Johan Kristoffersson	PSRX Volkswagen Sweden	4:32.988	6
2	44	(Germany) Timo Scheider	MJP Racing Team Austria	+2.815	5
3	11	(Norway) Petter Solberg	PSRX Volkswagen Sweden	+5.237	4
4	43	(United States) Ken Block	Hoonigan Racing Division	+8.382	3
5	71	(Sweden) Kevin Hansen	Team Peugeot-Hansen	+14.583	2
6	57	(Finland) Toomas Heikkinen	EKS RX		1

Semi-final 2

Pos.	No.	Driver	Team	Time	Pts
1	1	(Sweden) Mattias Ekström	EKS RX	4:34.563	6
2	13	(Norway) Andreas Bakkerud	Hoonigan Racing Division	+1.256	5
3	21	(Sweden) Timmy Hansen	Team Peugeot-Hansen	+1.707	4
4	100	(United Kingdom) Guy Wilks	LOCO Energy World RX	+5.800	3
5	87	(France) Jean-Baptiste Dubourg	DA Racing	+6.753	2
6	15	(Latvia) Reinis Nitišs	EKS RX	+7.391	1

=== Final ===
Pos.	No.	Driver	Team	Time	Pts
1	1	(Sweden) Mattias Ekström	EKS RX	4:32.260	8
2	44	(Germany) Timo Scheider	MJP Racing Team Austria	+0.362	5
3	13	(Norway) Andreas Bakkerud	Hoonigan Racing Division	+1.868	4
4	11	(Norway) Petter Solberg	PSRX Volkswagen Sweden	+2.625	3
5	21	(Sweden) Timmy Hansen	Team Peugeot-Hansen	+3.251	2
6	3	(Sweden) Johan Kristoffersson	PSRX Volkswagen Sweden	+3.976	1

== Standings after the event ==
Pos	Driver	Pts	Gap
1	(Sweden) Mattias Ekström	29	
2	(Germany) Timo Scheider	26	+3
3	(Norway) Andreas Bakkerud	22	+7
4	(Sweden) Johan Kristoffersson	21	+8
5	(Norway) Petter Solberg	19	+10

- Note: Only the top five positions are included.

Previous race: 2016 World RX of Argentina	FIA World Rallycross Championship; 2017 season	Next race: 2017 World RX of Portugal
Previous race: 2016 World RX of Barcelona	World RX of Barcelona	Next race: 2018 World RX of Barcelona
