= 2017 World RX of Hockenheim =

Rallycross event

- Round 3 of 12 in the 2017 FIA World Rallycross Championship
- Date: 5–7 May 2017
- Location: Hockenheim, Baden-Württemberg
- Venue: Hockenheimring

Results
Heat winners
- Heat 1: (France) Sébastien Loeb; Team Peugeot-Hansen
- Heat 2: (France) Sébastien Loeb; Team Peugeot-Hansen
- Heat 3: (Norway) Petter Solberg; PSRX Volkswagen Sweden
- Heat 4: (Sweden) Timmy Hansen; Team Peugeot-Hansen
Semi-final winners
- Semi-final 1: Johan Kristoffersson; PSRX Volkswagen Sweden
- Semi-final 2: (Sweden) Mattias Ekström; EKS RX
Final
- First: (Sweden) Mattias Ekström; EKS RX
- Second: Johan Kristoffersson; PSRX Volkswagen Sweden
- Third: (Sweden) Timmy Hansen; Team Peugeot-Hansen

World RX layout of Hockenheimring

The 2017 World RX of Hockenheim was the third round of the fourth season of the FIA World Rallycross Championship. The event was held at the Hockenheimring in Hockenheim, Baden-Württemberg, alongside the Deutsche Tourenwagen Masters.

== Supercar ==
=== Heats ===
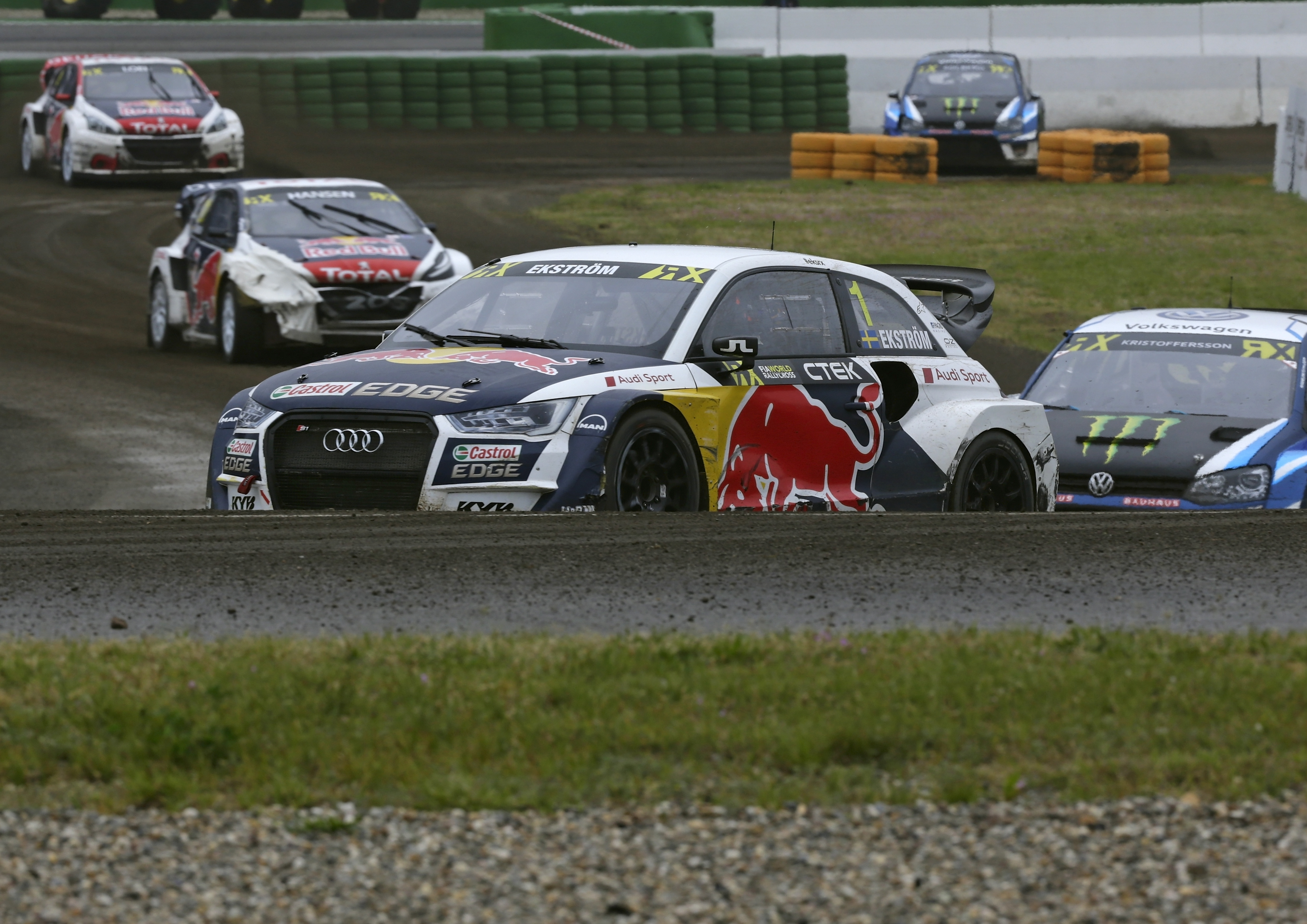
Mattias Ekström leads the two Volkswagens and Peugeot-Hansen team-mates Hansen and Loeb

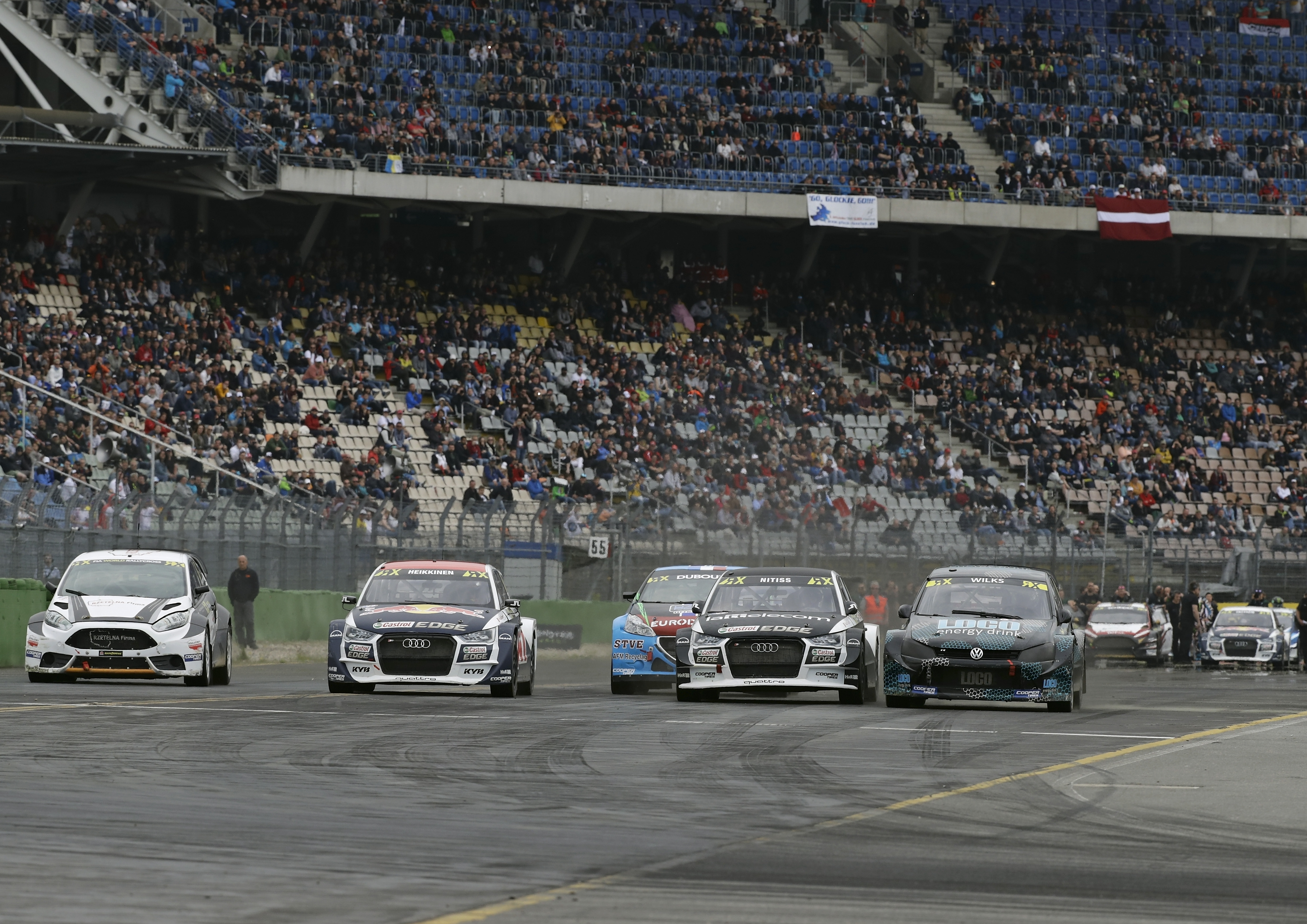
L-R: Kaczmarski, Heikkinen, Dubourg, Nitišs and Wilks

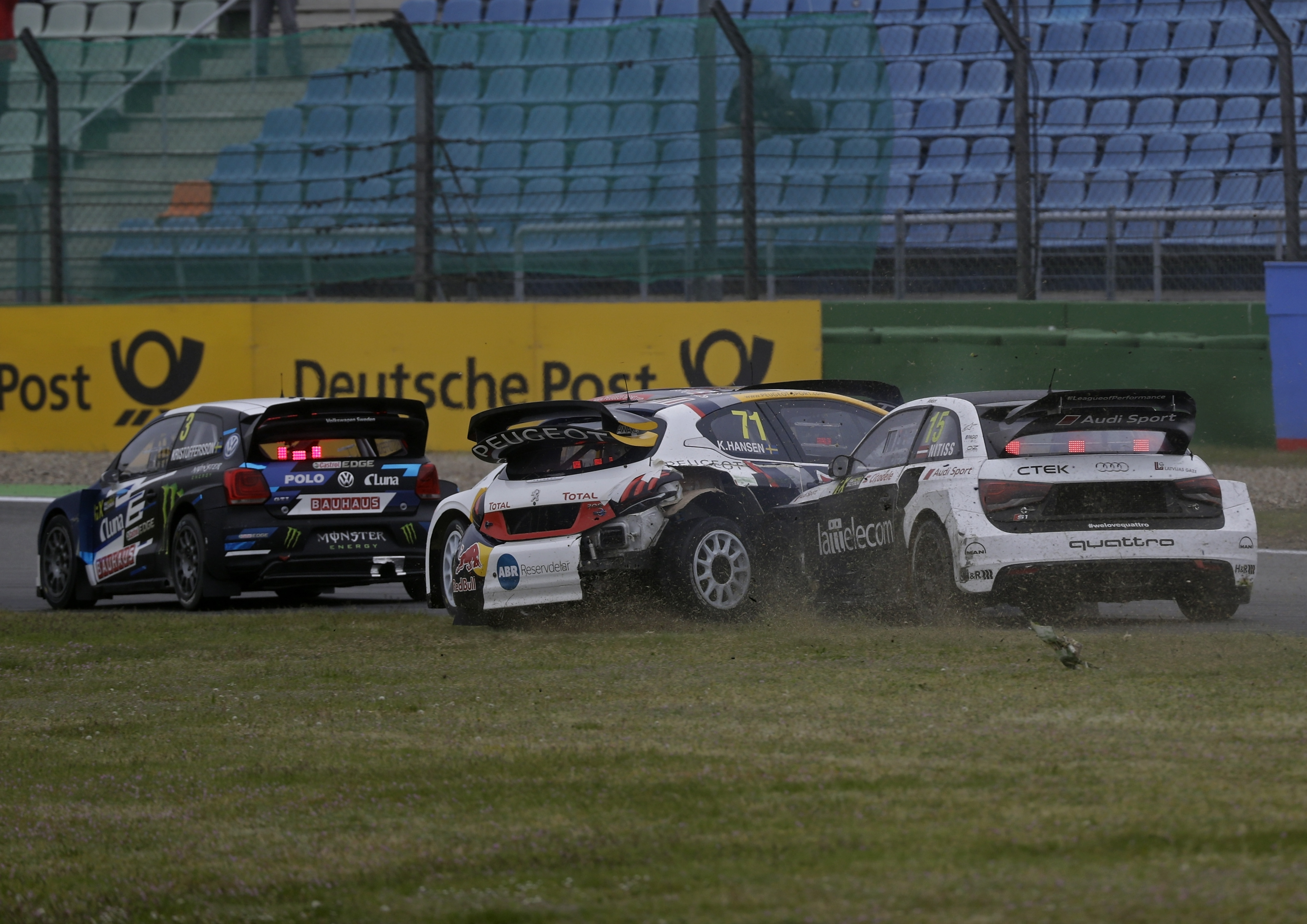
Nitišs and Kevin Hansen collide at the start of the 1st Semi-Final

Pos.	No.	Driver	Team	Car	Q1	Q2	Q3	Q4	Pts
1	9	(France) Sébastien Loeb	Team Peugeot-Hansen	Peugeot 208	1st	1st	2nd	7th	16
2	21	(Sweden) Timmy Hansen	Team Peugeot-Hansen	Peugeot 208	5th	2nd	6th	1st	15
3	3	(Sweden) Johan Kristoffersson	PSRX Volkswagen Sweden	Volkswagen Polo GTI	2nd	3rd	5th	4th	14
4	1	(Sweden) Mattias Ekström	EKS RX	Audi S1	9th	8th	3rd	3rd	13
5	11	(Norway) Petter Solberg	PSRX Volkswagen Sweden	Volkswagen Polo GTI	3rd	21st	1st	2nd	12
6	44	(Germany) Timo Scheider	MJP Racing Team Austria	Ford Fiesta	6th	9th	7th	5th	11
7	71	(Sweden) Kevin Hansen	Team Peugeot-Hansen	Peugeot 208	3rd	5th	15th	14th	10
8	7	(Russia) Timur Timerzyanov	STARD	Ford Fiesta	7th	7th	16th	9th	9
9	96	(Sweden) Kevin Eriksson	MJP Racing Team Austria	Ford Fiesta	18th	6th	4th	11th	8
10	43	(United States) Ken Block	Hoonigan Racing Division	Ford Focus RS	12th	4th	18th	6th	7
11	15	(Latvia) Reinis Nitišs	EKS RX	Audi S1	4th	12th	9th	17th	6
12	57	(Finland) Toomas Heikkinen	EKS RX	Audi S1	15th	14th	11th	8th	5
13	4	(Sweden) Robin Larsson	Robin Larsson	Audi A1	13th	18th	8th	13th	4
14	13	(Norway) Andreas Bakkerud	Hoonigan Racing Division	Ford Focus RS	10th	17th	16th	12th	3
15	6	(Latvia) Jānis Baumanis	STARD	Ford Fiesta	17th	10th	17th	12th	2
16	68	(Finland) Niclas Grönholm	GRX	Ford Fiesta	14th	17th	10th	15th	1
17	87	(France) Jean-Baptiste Dubourg	DA Racing	Peugeot 208	11th	13th	19th	19th	
18	69	(Poland) Martin Kaczmarski	Martin Kaczmarski	Ford Fiesta	16th	15th	14th	18th	
19	100	(United Kingdom) Guy Wilks	LOCO Energy World RX	Volkswagen Polo	20th	11th	13th	21st	
20	77	(Germany) René Münnich	All-Inkl.com Münnich Motorsport	SEAT Ibiza	19th	16th	22nd	16th	
21	36	(France) Guerlain Chicherit	Guerlain Chicherit	Renault Clio	21st	19th	20th	20th	
22	10	(Hungary) "Csucsu"	Speedy Motorsport	Kia Rio	22nd	20th	21st	22nd	

=== Semi-finals ===
Semi-final 1

Pos.	No.	Driver	Team	Time	Pts
1	3	(Sweden) Johan Kristoffersson	PSRX Volkswagen Sweden	6:08.008	6
2	11	(Norway) Petter Solberg	PSRX Volkswagen Sweden	+1.513	5
3	9	(France) Sébastien Loeb	Team Peugeot-Hansen	+2.481	4
4	96	(Sweden) Kevin Eriksson	MJP Racing Team Austria	+4.395	3
5	71	(Sweden) Kevin Hansen	Team Peugeot-Hansen	+19.174	2
6	15	(Latvia) Reinis Nitišs	EKS RX	+1:01.770	1

Semi-final 2

Pos.	No.	Driver	Team	Time	Pts
1	1	(Sweden) Mattias Ekström	EKS RX	6:16.725	6
2	21	(Sweden) Timmy Hansen	Team Peugeot-Hansen	+1.887	5
3	57	(Finland) Toomas Heikkinen	EKS RX	+3.500	4
4	7	(Russia) Timur Timerzyanov	STARD	+5.532	3
5	44	(Germany) Timo Scheider	MJP Racing Team Austria	+16.314	2
6	43	(United States) Ken Block	Hoonigan Racing Division	+17.513	1

=== Final ===
Pos.	No.	Driver	Team	Time/Retired	Pts
1	5	(Sweden) Mattias Ekström	EKS RX	6:04.066	8
2	3	(Sweden) Johan Kristoffersson	PSRX Volkswagen Sweden	+0.708	5
3	21	(Sweden) Timmy Hansen	Team Peugeot-Hansen	+2.501	4
4	1	(Norway) Petter Solberg	PSRX Volkswagen Sweden	+5.296	3
5	9	(France) Sébastien Loeb	Team Peugeot-Hansen	+6.352	2
6	57	(Finland) Toomas Heikkinen	EKS RX	+6.823	1

== Standings after the event ==
Pos	Driver	Pts	Gap
1	(Sweden) Mattias Ekström	85	
2	(Sweden) Johan Kristoffersson	69	+16
3	(Norway) Petter Solberg	62	+23
4	(France) Sébastien Loeb	48	+37
5	(Sweden) Timmy Hansen	47	+38

- Note: Only the top five positions are included.

Previous race: 2017 World RX of Portugal	FIA World Rallycross Championship; 2017 season	Next race: 2017 World RX of Belgium
Previous race: 2016 World RX of Hockenheim	World RX of Hockenheim	Next race: Incumbent
