= 2016 World RX of Argentina =

Rallycross event

- Round 12 of 12 in the 2016 FIA World Rallycross Championship
- Date: 26–27 November 2016
- Location: Rosario, Santa Fe
- Venue: Autódromo Municipal Juan Manuel Fangio

Results
Heat winners
- Heat 1: (Norway) Petter Solberg; Petter Solberg World RX Team
- Heat 2: (Norway) Petter Solberg; Petter Solberg World RX Team
- Heat 3: (Norway) Petter Solberg; Petter Solberg World RX Team
- Heat 4: (Norway) Petter Solberg; Petter Solberg World RX Team
Semi-final winners
- Semi-final 1: Johan Kristoffersson; Volkswagen RX Sweden
- Semi-final 2: (Norway) Andreas Bakkerud; Hoonigan Racing Division
Final
- First: (Norway) Andreas Bakkerud; Hoonigan Racing Division
- Second: Johan Kristoffersson; Volkswagen RX Sweden
- Third: (Finland) Toomas Heikkinen; EKS RX

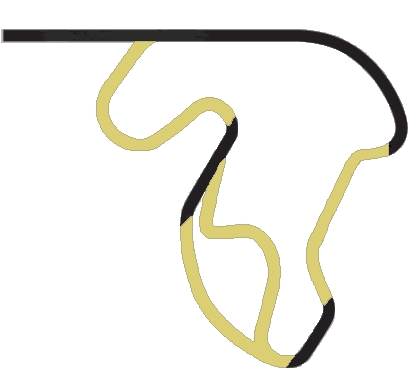
World RX layout of Autódromo Municipal Juan Manuel Fangio

The 2016 World RX of Argentina was the twelfth and final round of the third season of the FIA World Rallycross Championship. The event was held at the Autódromo Municipal Juan Manuel Fangio in Rosario, Santa Fe.

== Heats ==
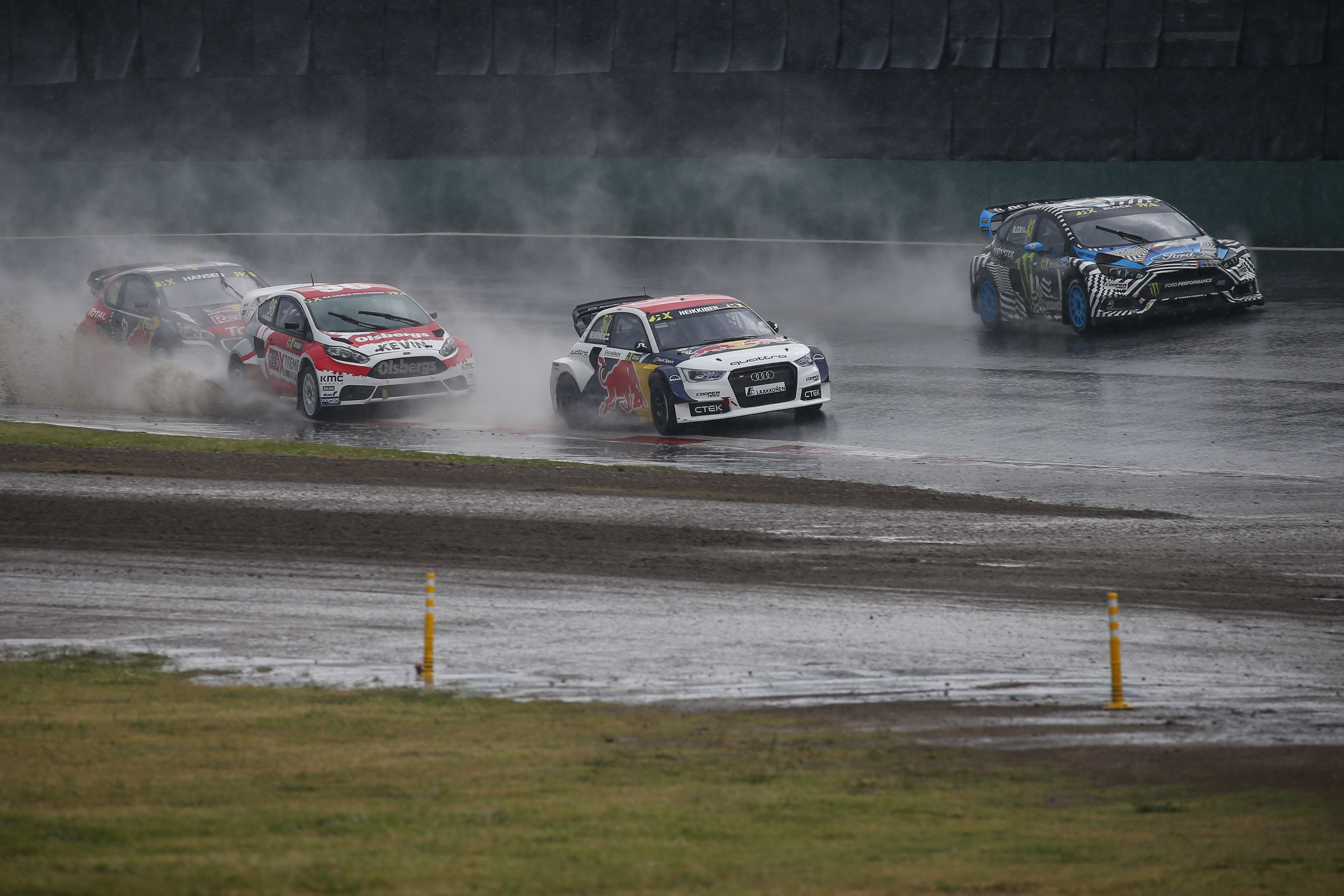
Q1 was held in torrential rain, leading to a delayed Q2

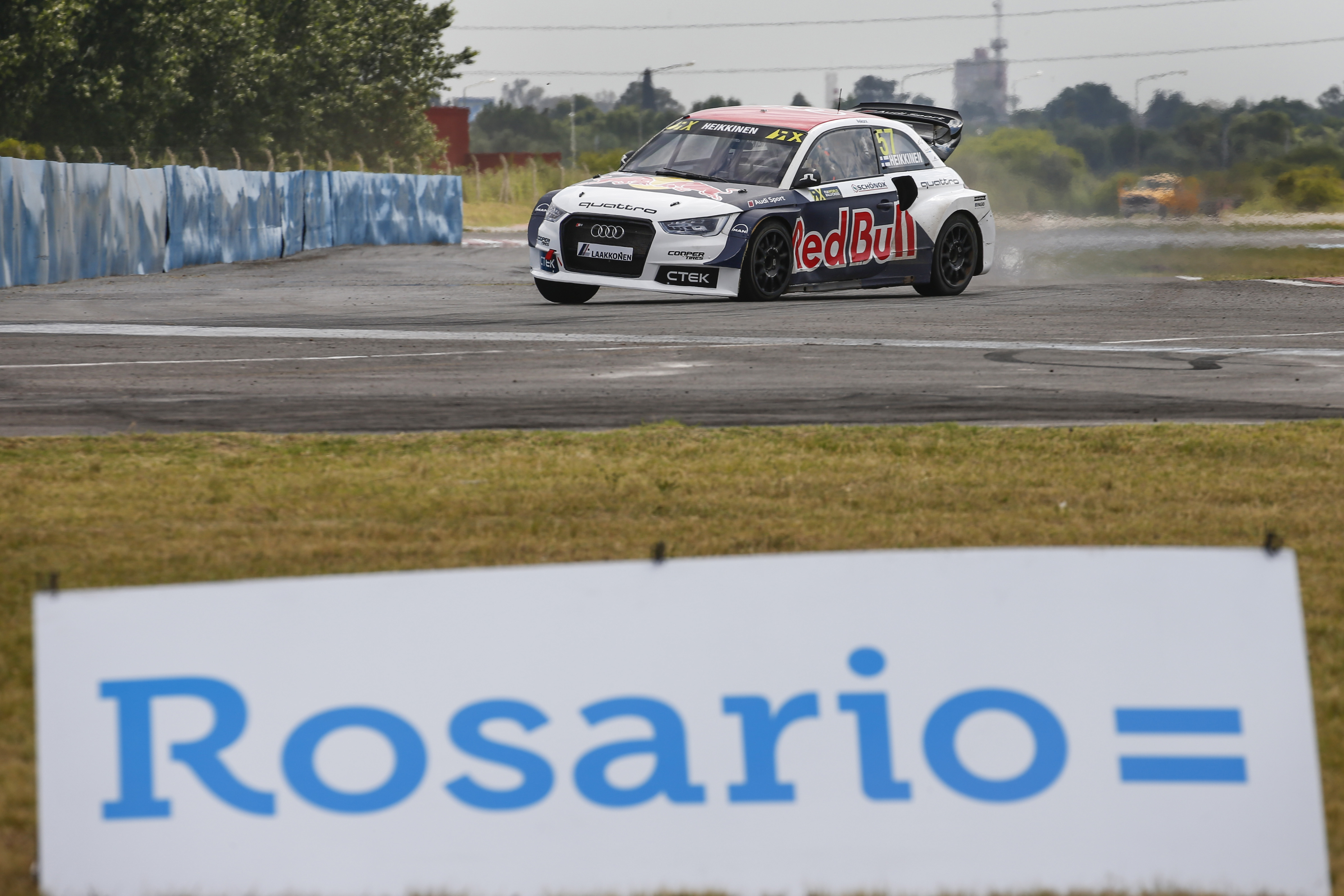
The 2016 race will be the last held in Argentina for the foreseeable future

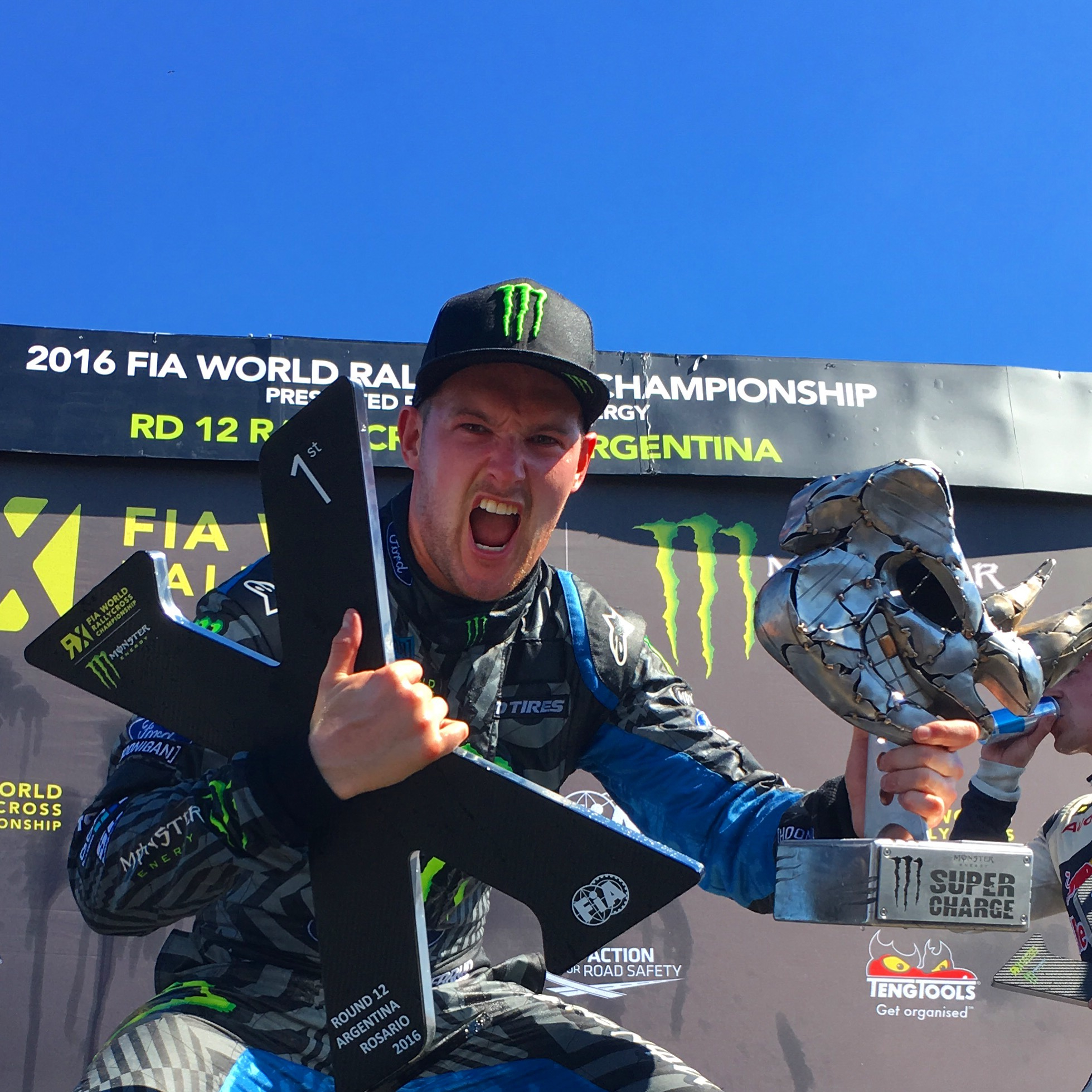
Andreas Bakkerud won the event

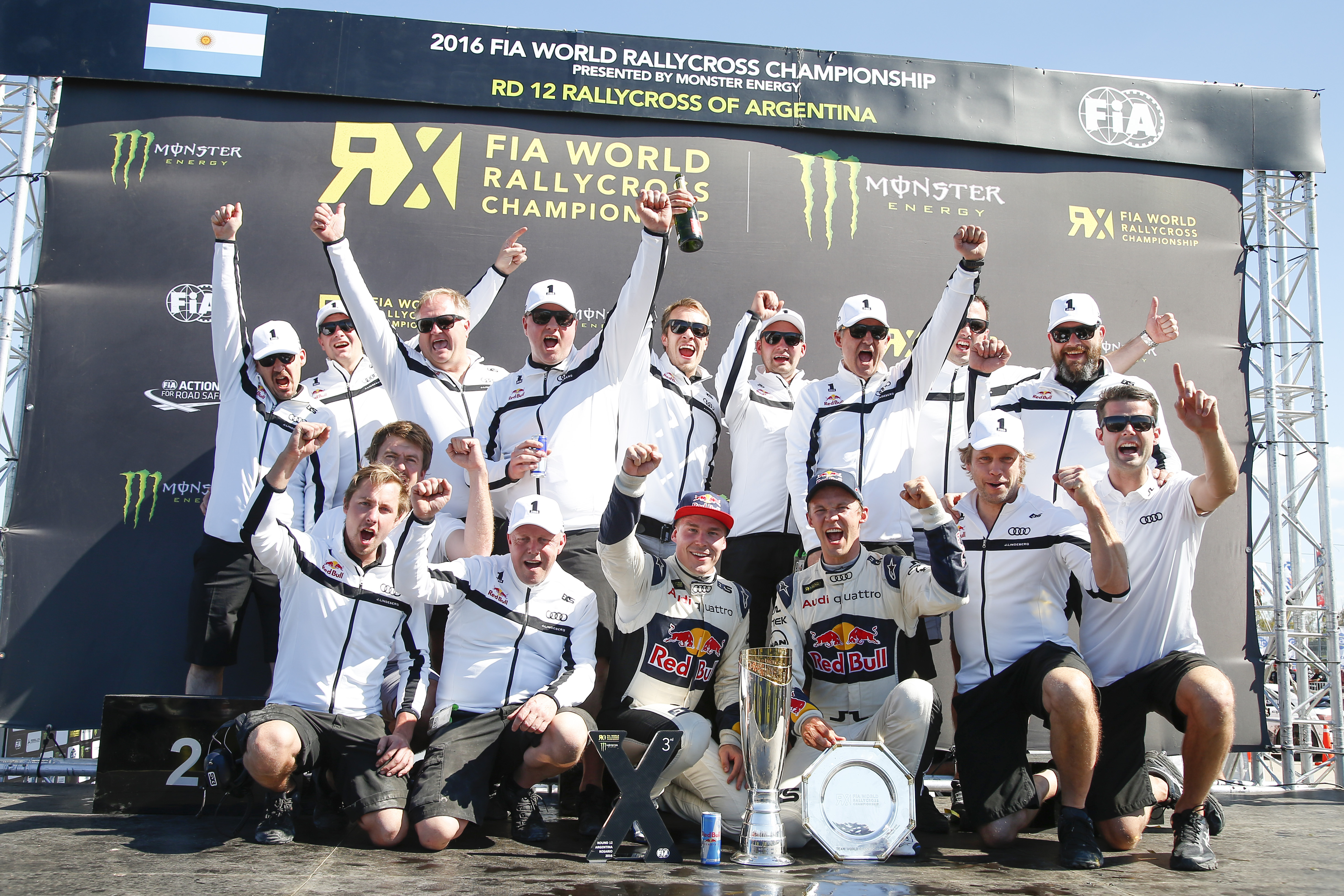
The EKS RX team celebrate their first drivers' and teams' championships

Pos.	No.	Driver	Team	Car	Q1	Q2	Q3	Q4	Pts
1	1	(Norway) Petter Solberg	Petter Solberg World RX Team	Citroën DS3	1st	1st	1st	1st	16
2	13	(Norway) Andreas Bakkerud	Hoonigan Racing Division	Ford Focus RS	4th	3rd	3rd	2nd	15
3	5	(Sweden) Mattias Ekström	EKS RX	Audi S1	2nd	4th	4th	3rd	14
4	9	(France) Sébastien Loeb	Team Peugeot-Hansen	Peugeot 208	13th	2nd	2nd	4th	13
5	3	(Sweden) Johan Kristoffersson	Volkswagen RX Sweden	Volkswagen Polo	3rd	8th	6th	5th	12
6	15	(Latvia) Reinis Nitišs	Olsbergs MSE	Ford Fiesta	11th	7th	7th	10th	11
7	7	(Russia) Timur Timerzyanov	World RX Team Austria	Ford Fiesta	8th	5th	5th	16th	10
8	4	(Sweden) Robin Larsson	Larsson Jernberg Motorsport	Audi A1	9th	13th	10th	6th	9
9	57	(Finland) Toomas Heikkinen	EKS RX	Audi S1	10th	10th	11th	9th	8
10	92	(Sweden) Anton Marklund	Volkswagen RX Sweden	Volkswagen Polo	7th	12th	12th	11th	7
11	6	(Latvia) Jānis Baumanis	World RX Team Austria	Ford Fiesta	5th	11th	14th	12th	6
12	44	(Germany) Timo Scheider	All-Inkl.com Münnich Motorsport	SEAT Ibiza	14th	6th	8th	15th	5
13	21	(Sweden) Timmy Hansen	Team Peugeot-Hansen	Peugeot 208	15th	14th	9th	7th	4
14	77	(Germany) René Münnich	All-Inkl.com Münnich Motorsport	SEAT Ibiza	12th	9th	15th	14th	3
15	43	(United States) Ken Block	Hoonigan Racing Division	Ford Focus RS	6th	16th	16th	13th	2
16	96	(Sweden) Kevin Eriksson	Olsbergs MSE	Ford Fiesta ST	16th	15th	13th	8th	1
17	94	(United Kingdom) Nick Jones	JRM Racing	BMW MINI Countryman	17th	17th	17th	17th	

== Semi-finals ==
Semi-final 1

Pos.	No.	Driver	Team	Time	Pts
1	3	(Sweden) Johan Kristoffersson	Volkswagen RX Sweden	3:56.182	6
2	5	(Sweden) Mattias Ekström	EKS RX	+2.476	5
3	57	(Finland) Toomas Heikkinen	EKS RX	+4.513	4
4	7	(Russia) Timur Timerzyanov	World RX Team Austria	+7.767	3
5	1	(Norway) Petter Solberg	Petter Solberg World RX Team	+1:24.635	2
6	6	(Latvia) Jānis Baumanis	World RX Team Austria	DNF	1

Semi-final 2

Pos.	No.	Driver	Team	Time	Pts
1	13	(Norway) Andreas Bakkerud	Hoonigan Racing Division	3:52.872	6
2	44	(Germany) Timo Scheider	All-Inkl.com Münnich Motorsport	+2.523	5
3	4	(Sweden) Robin Larsson	Larsson Jernberg Motorsport	+5.003	4
4	92	(Sweden) Anton Marklund	Volkswagen RX Sweden	+5.883	3
5	9	(France) Sébastien Loeb	Team Peugeot-Hansen	+6.404	2
6	15	(Latvia) Reinis Nitišs	Olsbergs MSE	+11.004	1

== Final ==
Pos.	No.	Driver	Team	Time	Pts
1	13	(Norway) Andreas Bakkerud	Hoonigan Racing Division	3:48.219	8
2	3	(Sweden) Johan Kristoffersson	Volkswagen RX Sweden	+1.991	5
3	57	(Finland) Toomas Heikkinen	EKS RX	+3.823	4
4	44	(Germany) Timo Scheider	All-Inkl.com Münnich Motorsport	+4.818	3
5	5	(Sweden) Mattias Ekström	EKS RX	+6.263	2
6	4	(Sweden) Robin Larsson	Larsson Jernberg Motorsport	+11.559	1

== Standings after the event ==
Pos	Driver	Pts	Gap
WC	(Sweden) Mattias Ekström	272	
2	(Sweden) Johan Kristoffersson	240	+32
3	(Norway) Andreas Bakkerud	239	+33
4	(Norway) Petter Solberg	239	+33
5	(France) Sébastien Loeb	209	+63

Previous race: 2016 World RX of Germany	FIA World Rallycross Championship; 2016 season	Next race: 2017 World RX of Barcelona
Previous race: 2015 World RX of Argentina	World RX of Argentina	Next race: None
