= Volkswagen Polo Mk5 =

Supermini car

Volkswagen Polo Mk5 (6R/6C/61)
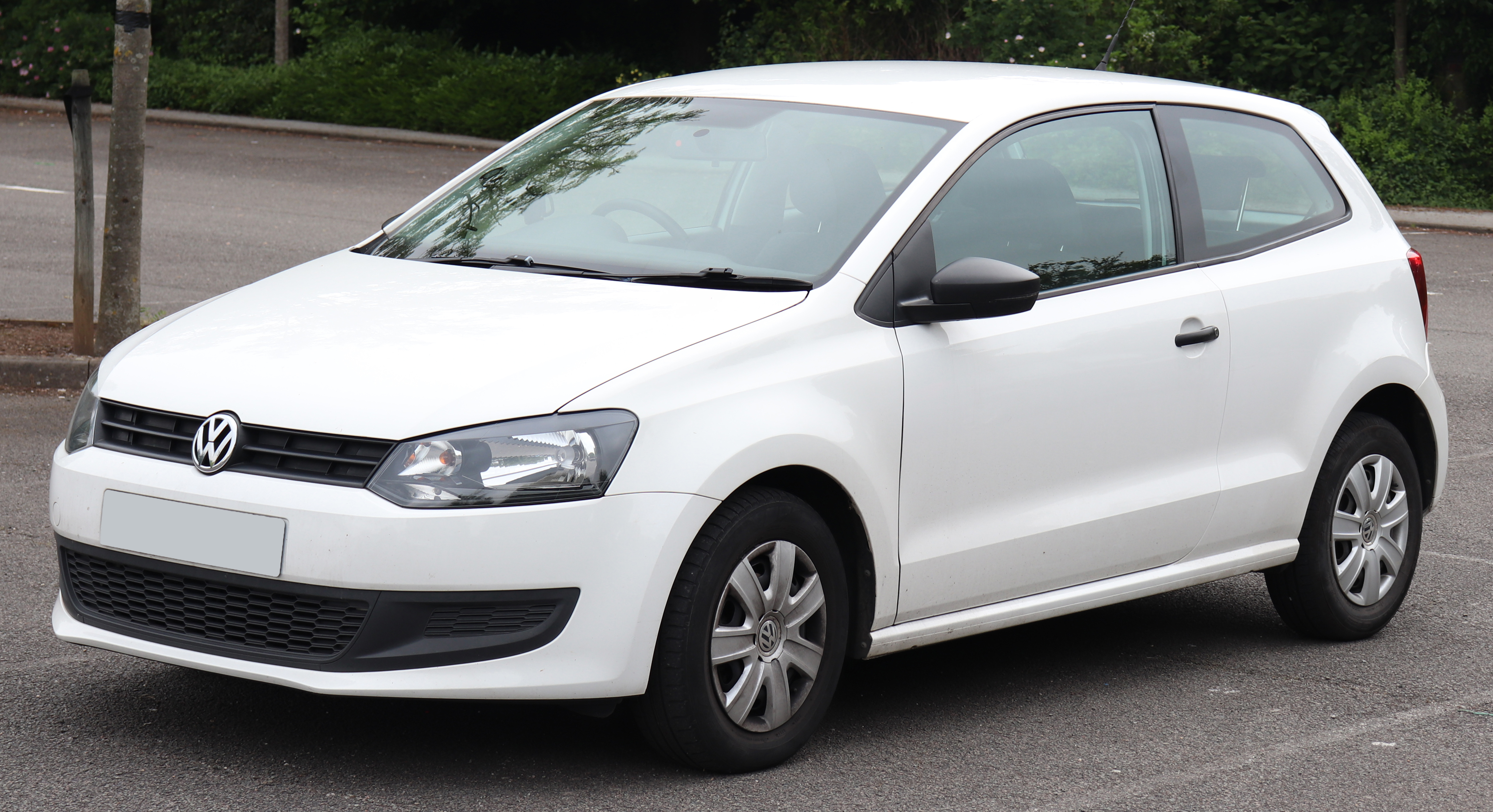

Overview
- Manufacturer: Volkswagen
- Also called: Volkswagen Vento (LWB sedan); Volkswagen Ameo (SWB sedan); Volkswagen Polo Vivo (South Africa and Kenya, 2018–present); Škoda Rapid (India, sedan)
- Production: 2009–2017; 2010–2020 (Russia); 2010–2022 (India); 2018–present (Polo Vivo, South Africa and Kenya)
- Assembly: Spain: Pamplona; India: Chakan (Škoda VW India); South Africa: Uitenhage; Kenya: Thika (Kenya Vehicle Manufacturers (KVM)) (Polo Vivo); Russia: Kaluga; China: Anting (SAIC-VW); Malaysia: Pekan (DRB-HICOM)
- Designer: Walter de Silva

Body and chassis
- Class: Supermini (B)
- Body style: 3-door hatchback; 5-door hatchback; 4-door sedan
- Layout: Front-engine, front-wheel-drive
- Platform: Volkswagen Group PQ25 (pre-facelift); Volkswagen Group PQ26 (facelift)
- Related: SEAT Ibiza Mk4; Audi A1

Powertrain
- Engine: Petrol: 1.0 L MPI I3 12v; 1.0 L TSI I3 12v (turbo); 1.2 L MPI I3 12v; 1.2 L TSI I4 8v/16v (turbo); 1.4 L MPI I4 16v; 1.4 L TSI I4 16v (turbo); 1.6 L MPI I4 16v; Diesel: 1.2 L TDI CR I3 12v (turbo); 1.4 L TDI CR I3 12v (turbo); 1.5 L TDI CR I4 16v (turbo); 1.6 L TDI CR I4 16v (turbo)
- Transmission: 5-speed manual; 6-speed manual; 6-speed Tiptronic automatic; 7-speed DSG dual-clutch automatic

Dimensions
- Wheelbase: 2,470 mm (97 in) (hatchback and Ameo); 2,552 mm (100.5 in) (sedan)
- Length: 3,952 mm (155.6 in) (hatchback); 4,390 mm (172.8 in) (sedan); 3,995 mm (157.3 in) (Ameo)
- Width: 1,682 mm (66.2 in)
- Height: 1,454–1,483 mm (57.2–58.4 in)

Chronology
- Predecessor: Volkswagen Polo Mk4
- Successor: Volkswagen Polo Mk6; Volkswagen Polo (CK) (Russia); Volkswagen Virtus (sedan)

The Volkswagen Polo Mk5 is the fifth generation of the Polo, a supermini-class car manufactured by Volkswagen since 2009. The vehicle unveiled at the 2009 Geneva Motor Show in March 2009, while the three-door version was unveiled at the 2009 Frankfurt Motor Show in September 2009. A four-door long-wheelbase sedan version has been produced and sold outside Europe in several emerging markets since 2010 either as the Volkswagen Vento or the Volkswagen Polo sedan. A short-wheelbase sedan version was sold in India between 2016 and 2020 as the Volkswagen Ameo.

As of 2024, the Polo Mk5 continues to be produced in South Africa as the Polo Vivo.The production of the Mk5 Polo at the India plant stopped in 2022, with the last Polo being sold in August 2022.

== Overview ==
Internally designated Typ 6R, the Polo Mk5 is based on Volkswagen's PQ25 platform shared with the SEAT Ibiza Mk4 and the Audi A1 Mk1. It was designed by a team led by Walter de Silva, following the styling direction of the Scirocco Mk3 and the Golf Mk6.

The Polo Mk5 is 44 mm (1.7 in) longer and 32 mm (1.3 in) wider, while it sits 13 mm (0.5 in) lower to the road than the previous generation Polo. Boot capacity is increased by 10 litres (0.35 ft^{3}) to 280 L (9.9 ft^{3}) of storage space with 952 L (33.6 ft^{3}) with the seats folded down. The car is 7.5% lighter than its predecessor. The Polo has thorax airbags and has been awarded a five-star Euro NCAP crash impact rating. For the first time in a Polo, a 7-speed dual clutch transmission and navigation systems with touchscreen controls are available as an option.

Production for the United Kingdom market started in August 2009, with first deliveries beginning in October 2009. Production of the Polo Mk5 in South Africa was announced in November 2009, producing five-door right-hand-drive Polo. As the result, the South African-made Polo was exported throughout many right-hand-drive markets, including UK, Ireland, Australia, Singapore and Malaysia. It was also introduced in India in February 2010 as the first mass-volume product offered by the brand in the country since its arrival in 2007. CKD assembly of the Polo also commenced in Malaysia between 2014 and 2020, with parts imported from India.

The Polo Mk5 is entirely skipped from being sold and produced in Brazil due to the high pricing of the previous generation Polo which results in a low sales figures.

The Volkswagen Polo won the 2010 European Car of the Year, defeating the Toyota iQ and Opel/Vauxhall Astra.

Since 2017, the Polo Mk5 hatchback was succeeded by the Polo Mk6 hatchback in most markets. In South Africa, the Polo Mk5 continued to be produced and marketed in South Africa alongside the newer Polo Mk6 since 2018 as the Polo Vivo, replacing the Polo Mk4-based Polo Vivo. In Russia and other CIS markets, the Polo Mk5 sedan was replaced by the Škoda Rapid-based Polo CK liftback in 2020. In Argentina and several other Latin American markets, the Polo Mk6-based Virtus replaced the Polo sedan Mk5, while in Mexico the Polo Mk5 sedan and hatchback continued to be sold in the country alongside the newer Virtus.

In India, the Polo Mk5 hatchback and sedan continued to be produced and offered in the country until 2022.

== Specifications ==
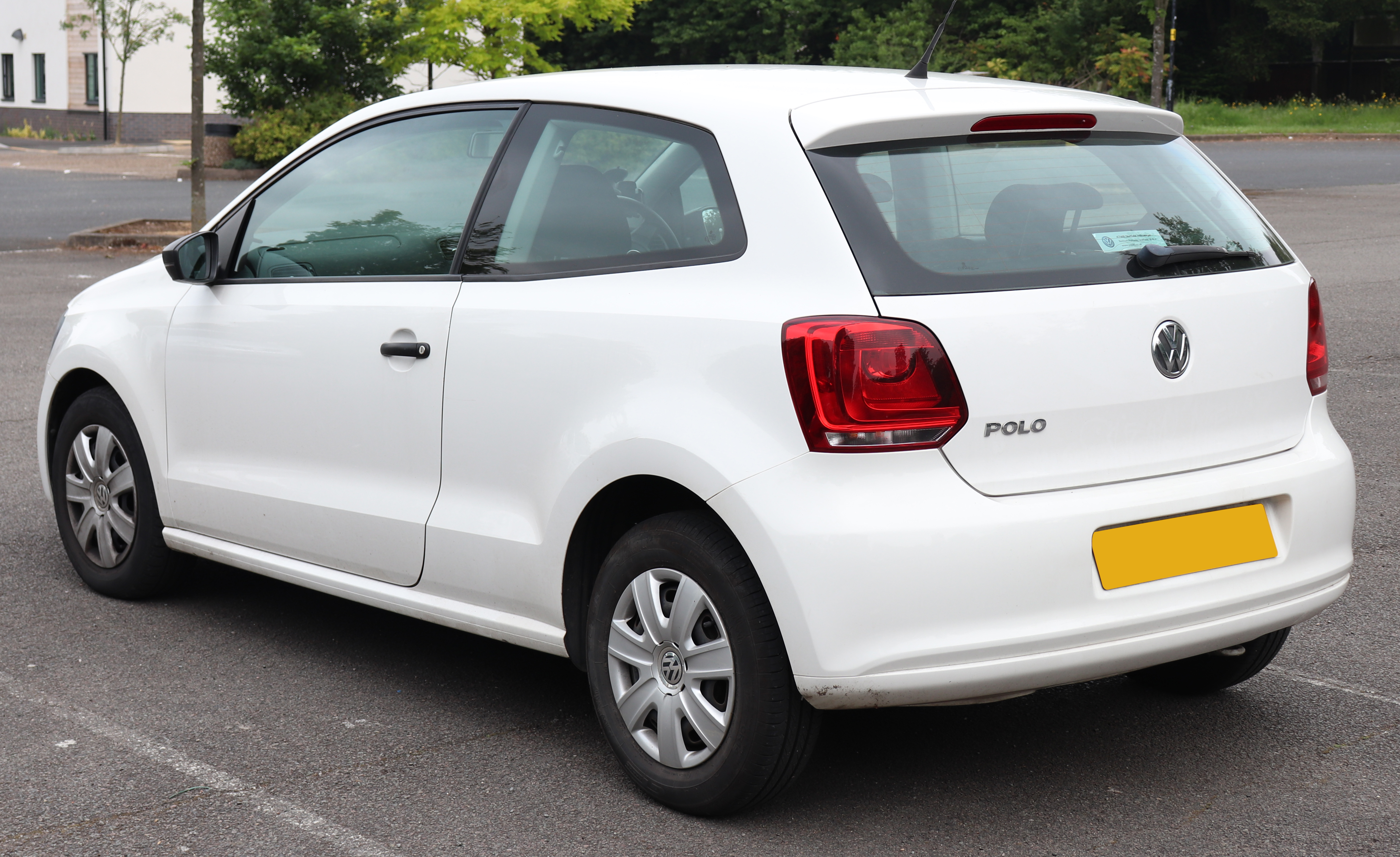
3-door hatchback (pre-facelift)

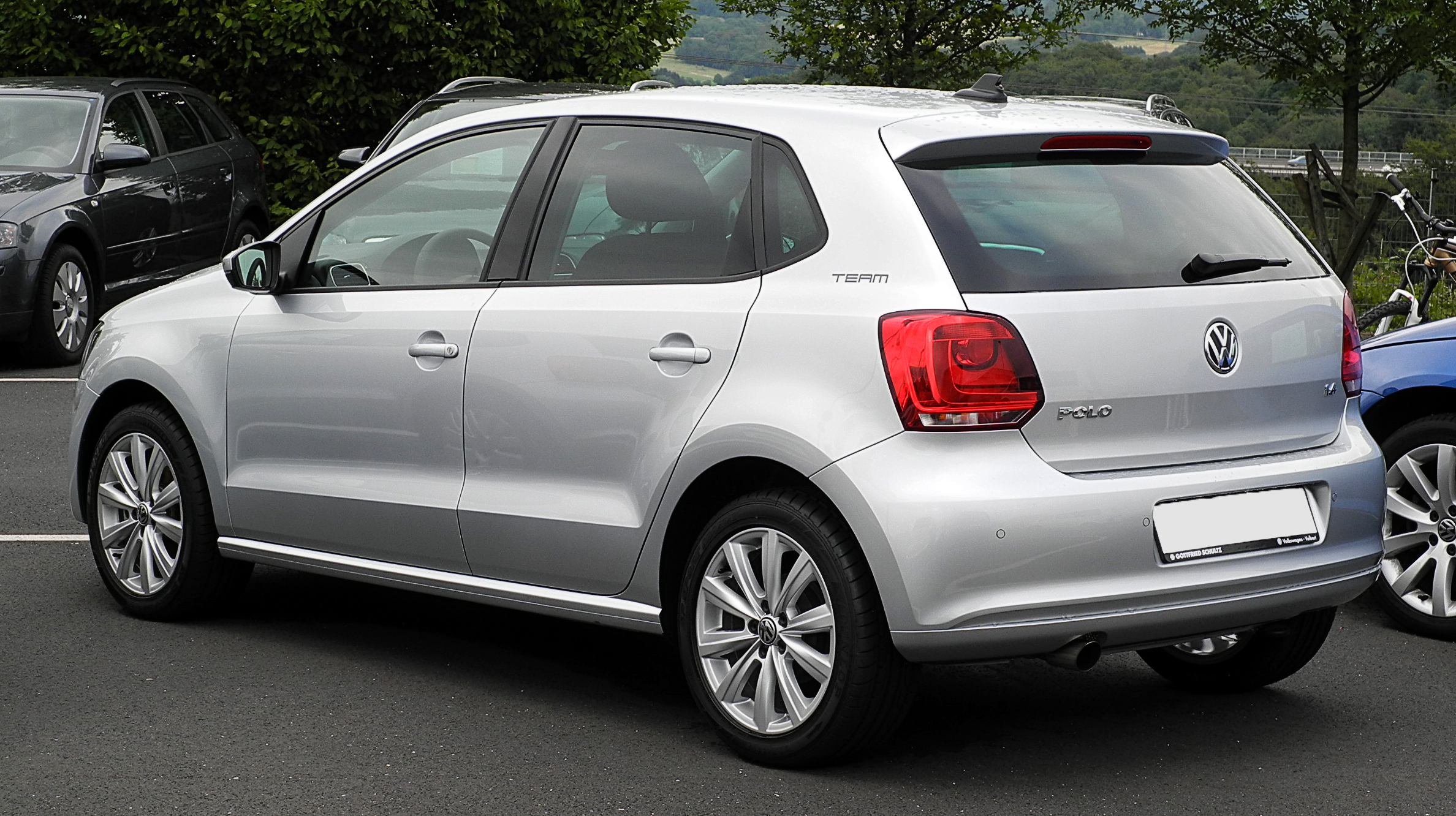
5-door hatchback (pre-facelift)

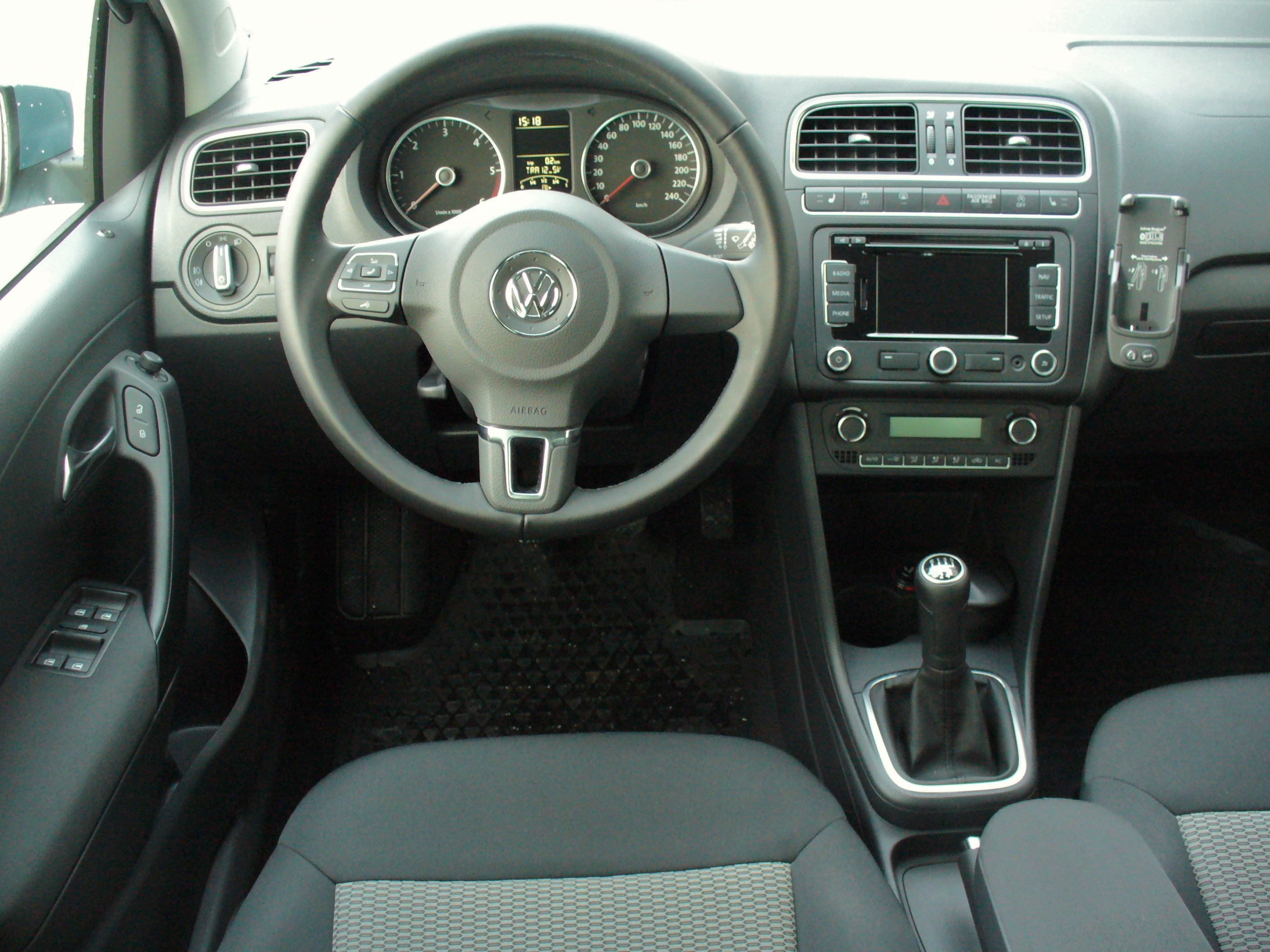
Interior

=== Features ===
The European version, with exceptions for the French and Turkish market, includes a standard ESP electronic stabilization program with Hill Hold Control, head-thorax airbags (integrated in the front seatbacks), belt tensioners and belt force limiters plus seatbelt warning indicator and head restraints, three rear head restraints and Isofix child seat preparation. In the Indian version of the Polo, the ground clearance was increased to a maximum gap of 168mm. Until 2013, the Highline variant of the Polo in India had dual front airbag with ABS and ESP was standard equipment. From 2013 onwards, the Comfortline and Highline variant had factory fitted Dual front airbag with ABS and ESP as standard.

In France, ESP and Hill Hold Control are standard equipment only on the models with engines no less than 85 PS (84 hp; 63 kW).

In Turkey, ESP and Hill Hold Control are optional equipment on all models except GTI and BlueMotion.

==== Trim levels ====
In its native Germany, India and South Africa as well as some European markets except France, Croatia, Slovenia and Bosnia and Herzegovina, Trendline, Comfortline and Highline trim levels are being offered in all versions.

In France, Italy and Romania, only Comfortline and Highline trim levels are being offered in all versions. In Croatia, Bosnia and Herzegovina as well as in Slovenia, trim level situation is not stable, these are Trendline, Comfortline (available up to 2012), Highline and special trim levels including Rabbit (2012–2013), Fresh (2014) and Lounge (2015).

== Polo GTI ==
The Polo GTI was presented together with the CrossPolo at the Geneva Motor Show in early March 2010 and was available since the end of May 2010.

Styling-wise, the Polo GTI differs from the standard Polo with its redesigned front and rear bumpers, widened side skirts, roof spoiler, standard fog lights, red brake calipers, 17-inch (430 mm) alloy wheels and a chrome-plated twin tailpipe. It is also equipped with a sports suspension that is about 15 mm (0.6 in) lower and an extended electronic limited slip differential, which is intended to reduce the vehicle's tendency to understeer by braking the front wheel on the inside of the bend when cornering quickly. In addition, the vehicle battery was relocated from the engine compartment to the spare wheel well for better weight distribution, which in turn reduces the usable luggage compartment volume from 280 to 204 litres (9.9 to 7.2 ft^{3}).

The 2010–2013 models are equipped with a 1.4-litre engine with a turbocharger and supercharger installed producing a maximum power 180 PS (178 hp; 132 kW) combined with a 7-speed double-clutch transmission and front-wheel-drive. According to the manufacturer, the vehicle is capable of accelerating from 0–100 km/h (0–62 mph) in 6.9 seconds and reach a top speed of 229 km/h (142 mph). At the same time, an improved technology is said to have reduced fuel consumption by 25 percent compared to the equally powerful previous model, the Polo GTI Cup Edition, and now amounts to 5.9 L/100 km (16.9 km/L; 39.9 mpg_{‑US}; 47.9 mpg_{‑imp}). This would correspond to CO_{2} emissions of 139 g/km.

The 2010–2012 engines were the CAV/CAVE engines which were then revised to the CTH/CTHE engines in the 2013 and 2014 models. This came with improved internals (pistons being the biggest update) to the engine which improved longevity, efficiency, and oil consumption.

For the 2014 facelift, the 1.4 TSI engine was replaced by a 1.8 TSI turbo engine with an output of 192 PS (189 hp; 141 kW). Since then, the model has been available with a 6-speed manual gearbox or a 7-speed DSG. The engine equipped with manual gearbox has a maximum torque of 320 N⋅m (32.6 kg⋅m; 236 lb⋅ft) while the DSG variant is limited to 250 N⋅m (25.5 kg⋅m; 184 lb⋅ft).

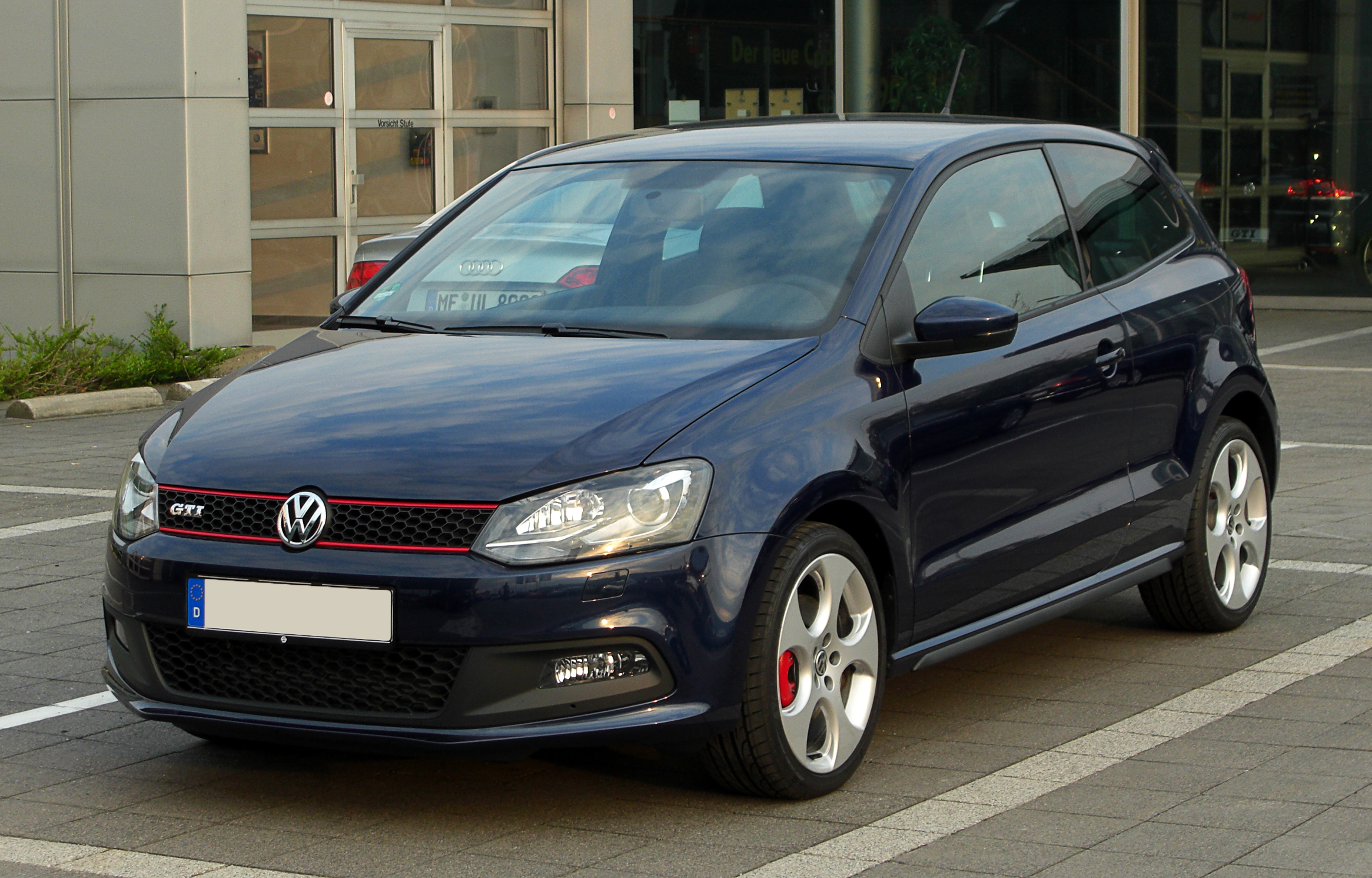
Volkswagen Polo GTI 3-door (pre-facelift)

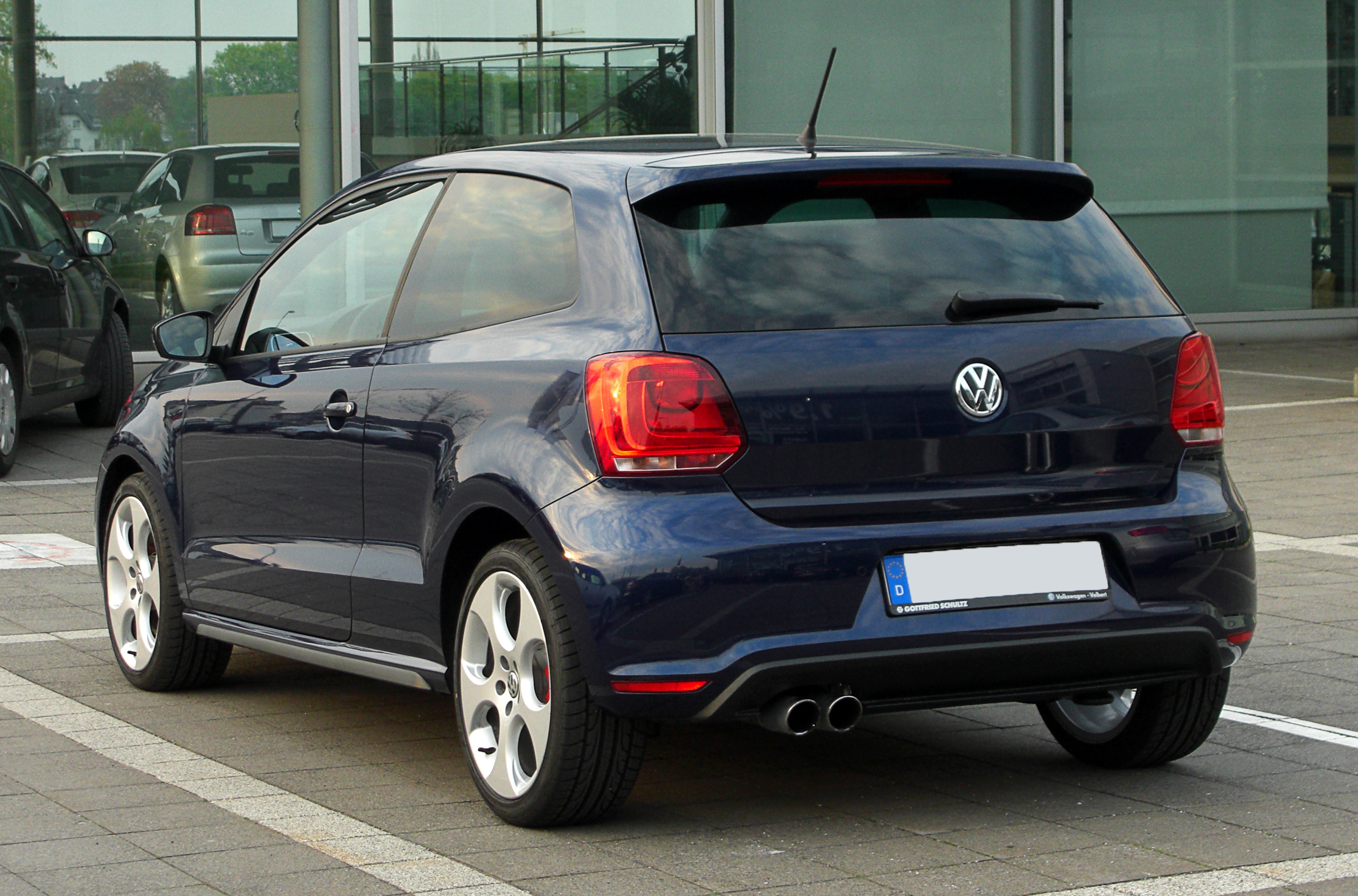
Volkswagen Polo GTI 3-door (pre-facelift)

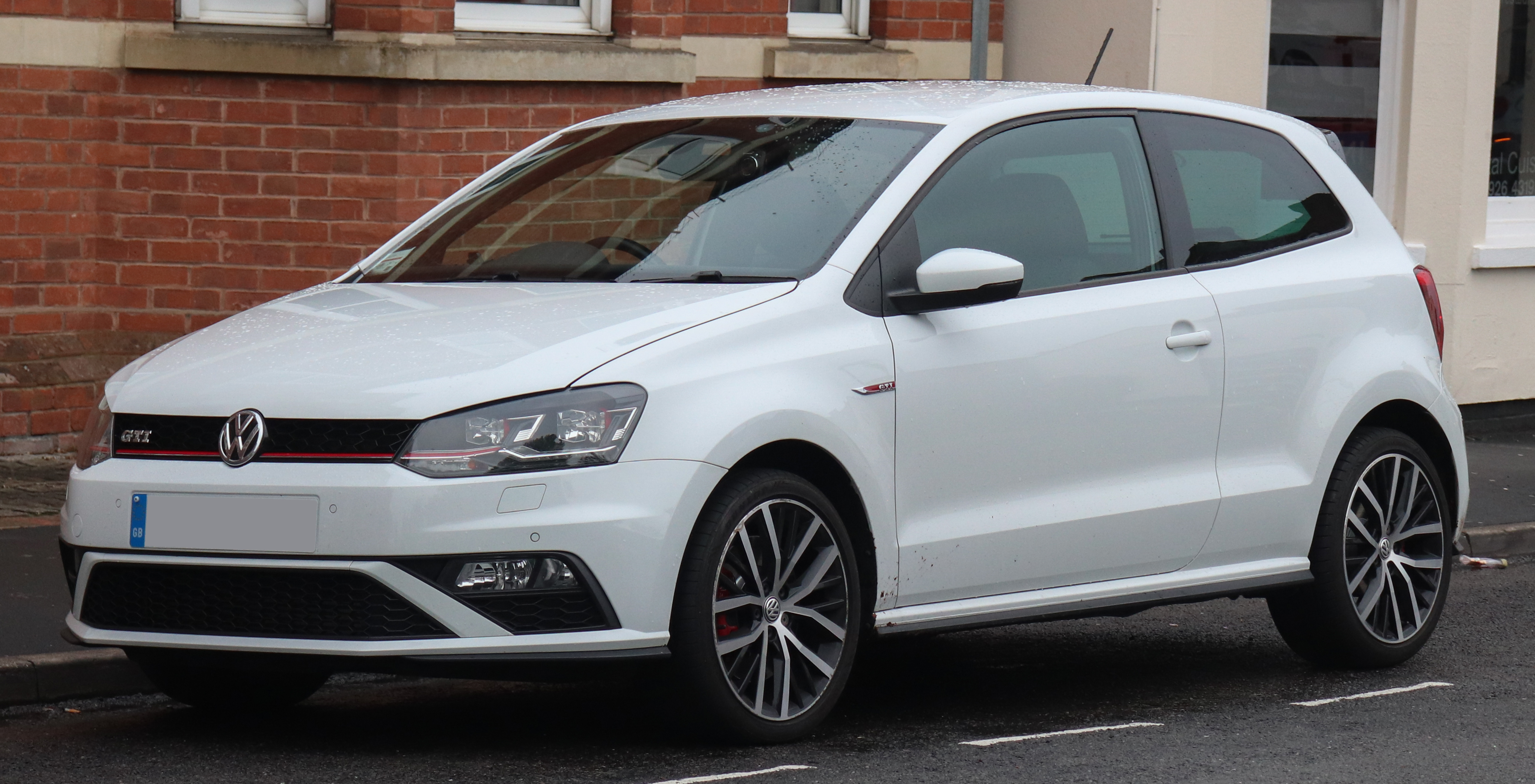
2015 Volkswagen Polo GTI 3-door (facelift)

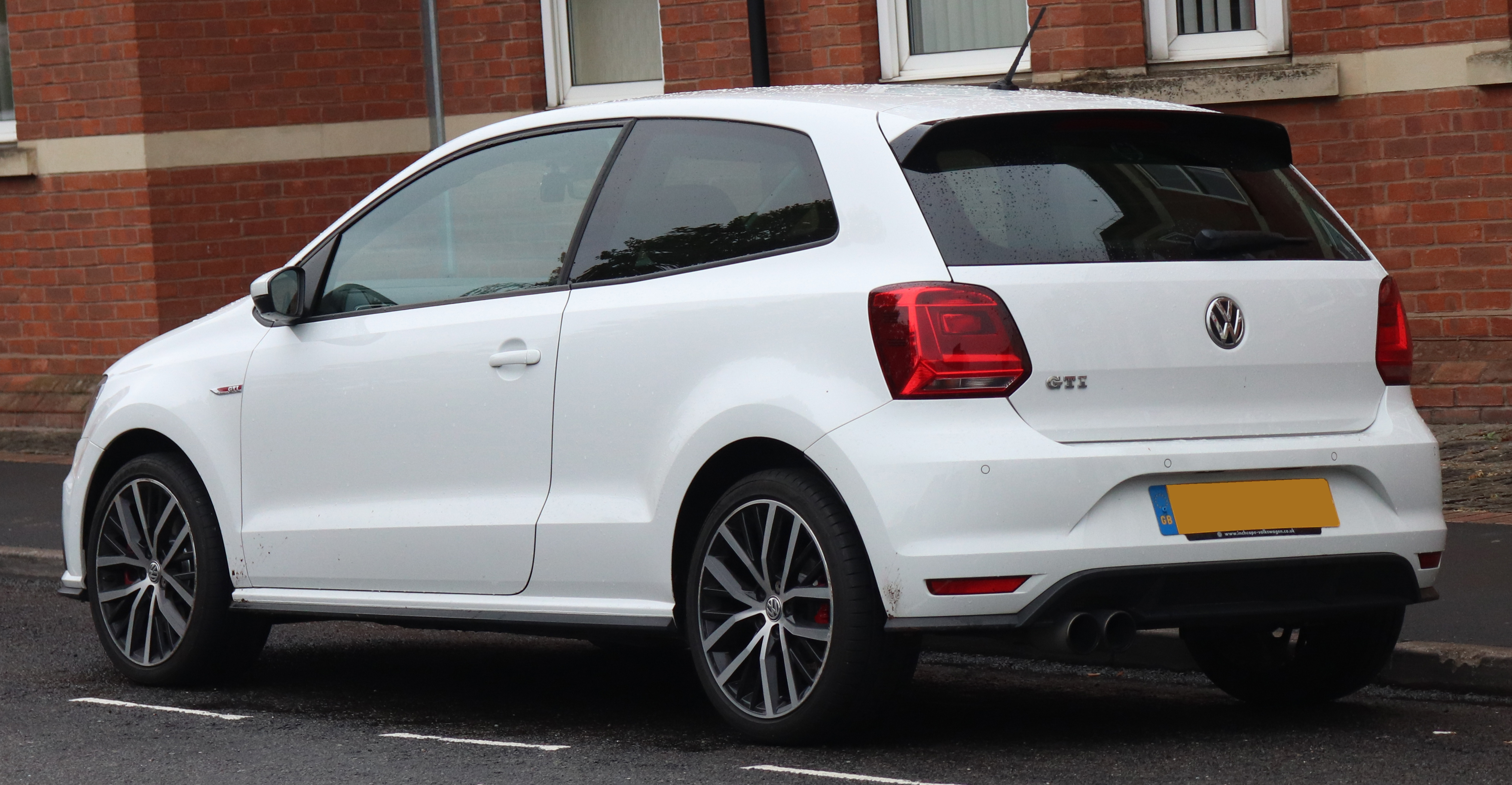
2015 Volkswagen Polo GTI 3-door (facelift)

== Cross Polo ==
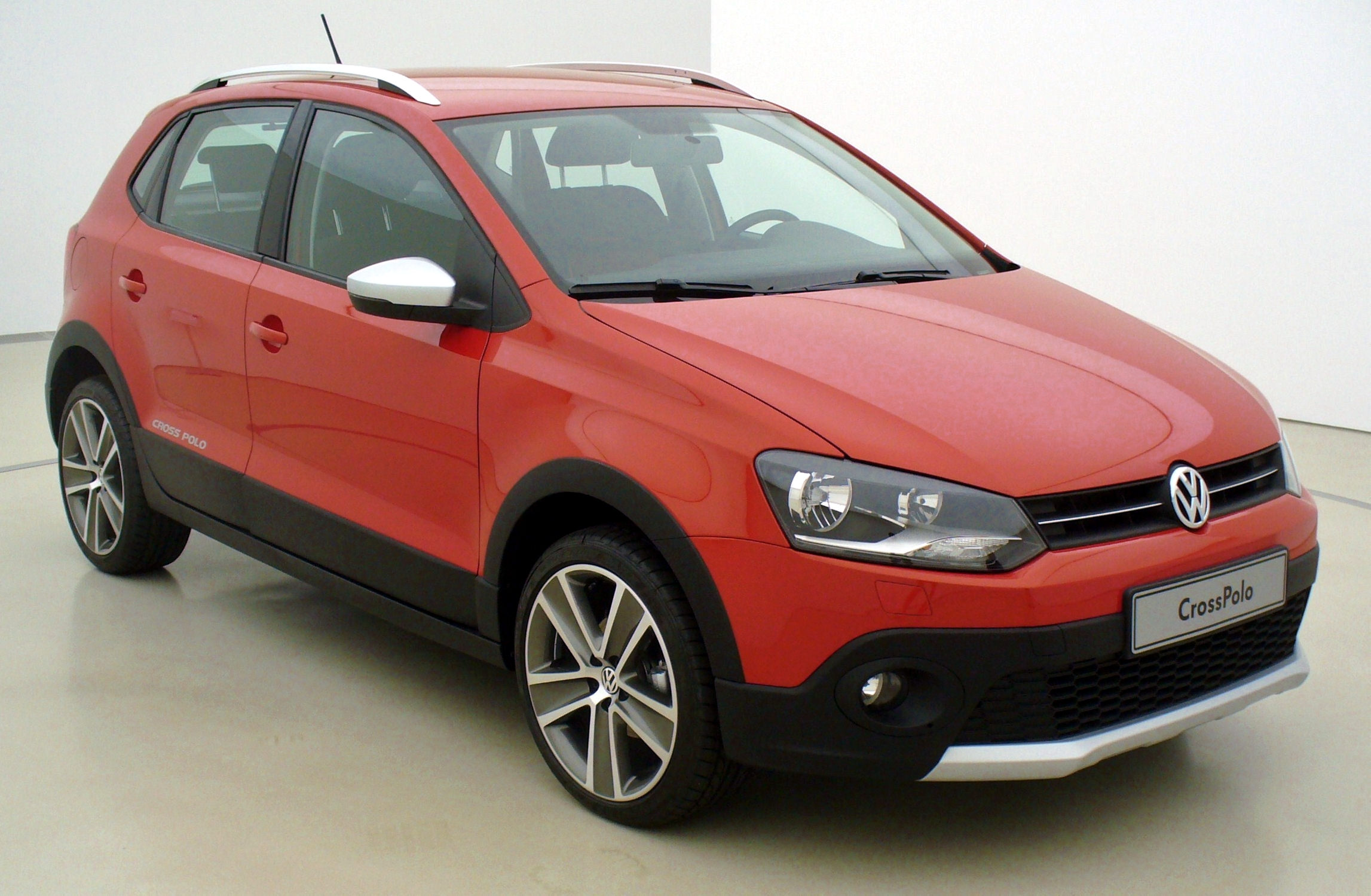
Volkswagen CrossPolo

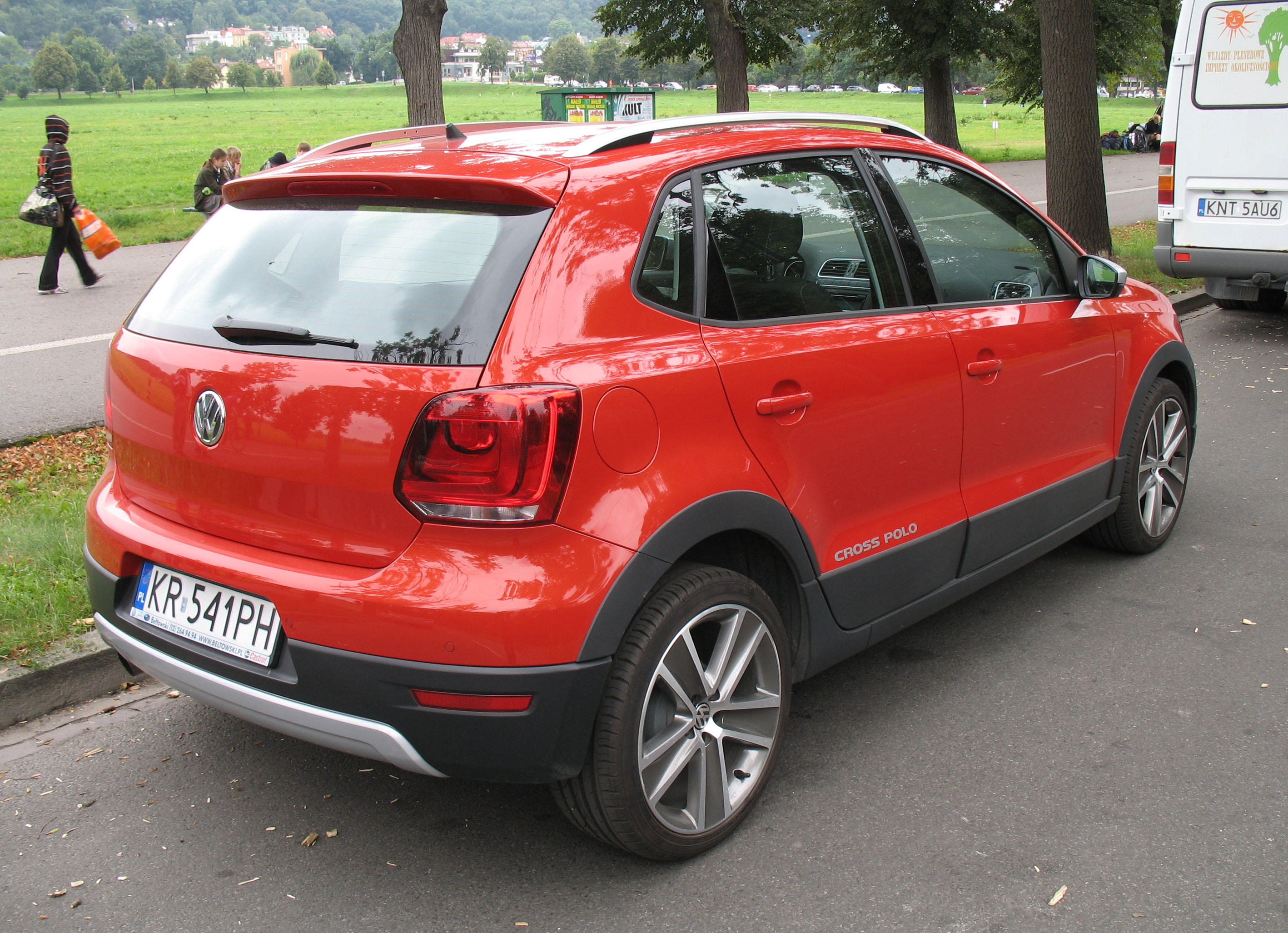
Volkswagen CrossPolo

In June 2010, Volkswagen presented the 2011 edition of the CrossPolo, a crossover-styled version of the Polo with extra ground clearance mainly obtained by the addition of an aluminium distancing block. Exclusively available with five doors, it is distinguished from the standard Polo by a redesigned front and rear bumpers, black plastic claddings on the wheel arches and doors, silver roof rails, standard fog lights and 17-inch alloy wheels. The side mirror housings are painted silver regardless of the color of the vehicle. The standard equipment includes sports seats for the driver and front passenger, and leather steering wheel.

The 2011 CrossPolo in Europe is available in petrol and three diesel engines, all Euro 5 compliant.

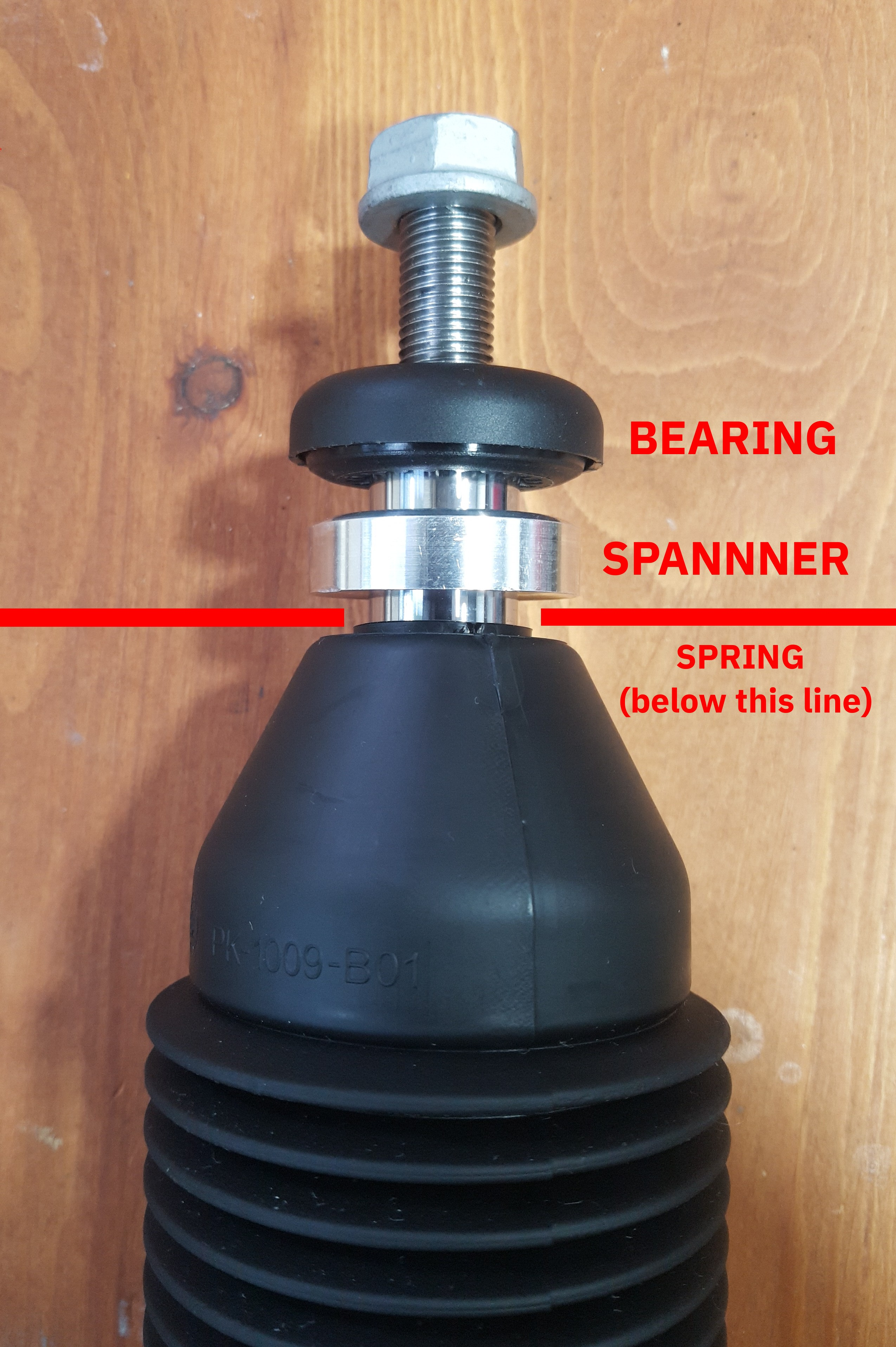
An extra aluminium distancing block/spanner is added by the manufacturer to the front suspension of the Polo Cross to gain an extra ground clearance for this specific variant.

In India, the CrossPolo was launched in August 2013 with a sole option of a 1.2-litre diesel engine. The 1.2-litre petrol version was released in January 2015. It was discontinued in 2017 due to slow sales.

== Facelift ==
The Polo 6R was facelifted in 2014 and is now known as the Polo 6C. With this came subtle exterior styling such as redesigned bumpers. The interior was re-vamped which now includes a touch screen as standard and a new steering wheel. The facelift Polo adds technology such as Automatic Post-Collision Braking System as standard across all model lines. It also has CarPlay and Android Auto support since June 2015.

A new 1.4-litre three cylinder diesel engine replaced the 1.2-litre and 1.6-litre diesel units, plus 1.4 TSI 132 kW (177 hp; 179 PS) of GTI was replaced by an Audi-developed 1.8 TSI, produces 141 kW (189 hp; 192 PS). In 2018 in India, the company replaced the 1.2-litre engine with the 1.0-litre naturally aspirated petrol engine, which has 76 PS (75 hp; 56 kW) and 95 NM (176 km; 109 mi) of torque.

In September 2019, the Mk5 Polo received another facelift in India. The facelifted Polo for the Indian market received a new front grille and bumpers taken from the Mk5 Polo GTI. This version is also exported to Mexico and Indonesia.

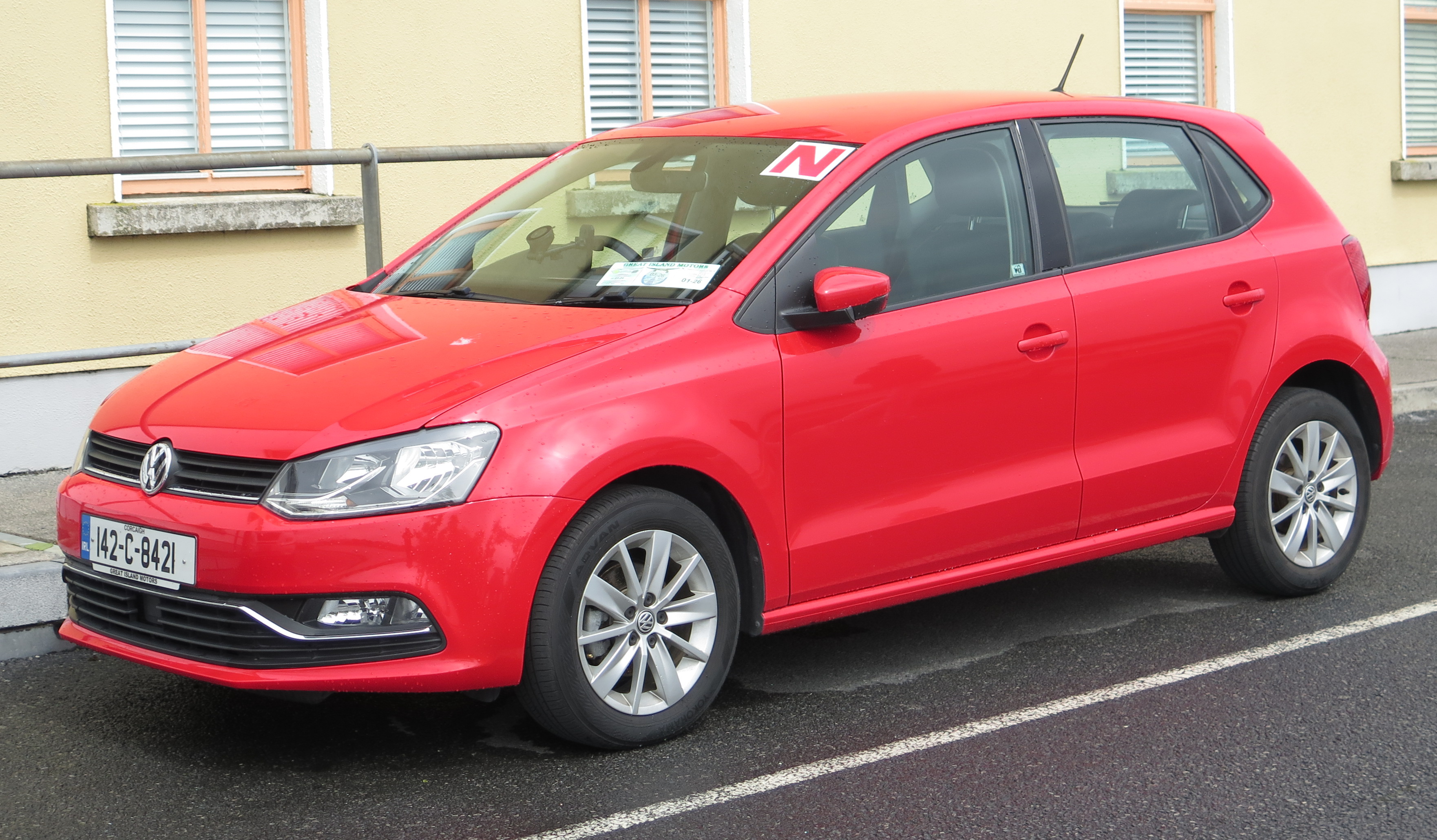
Volkswagen Polo (first facelift)

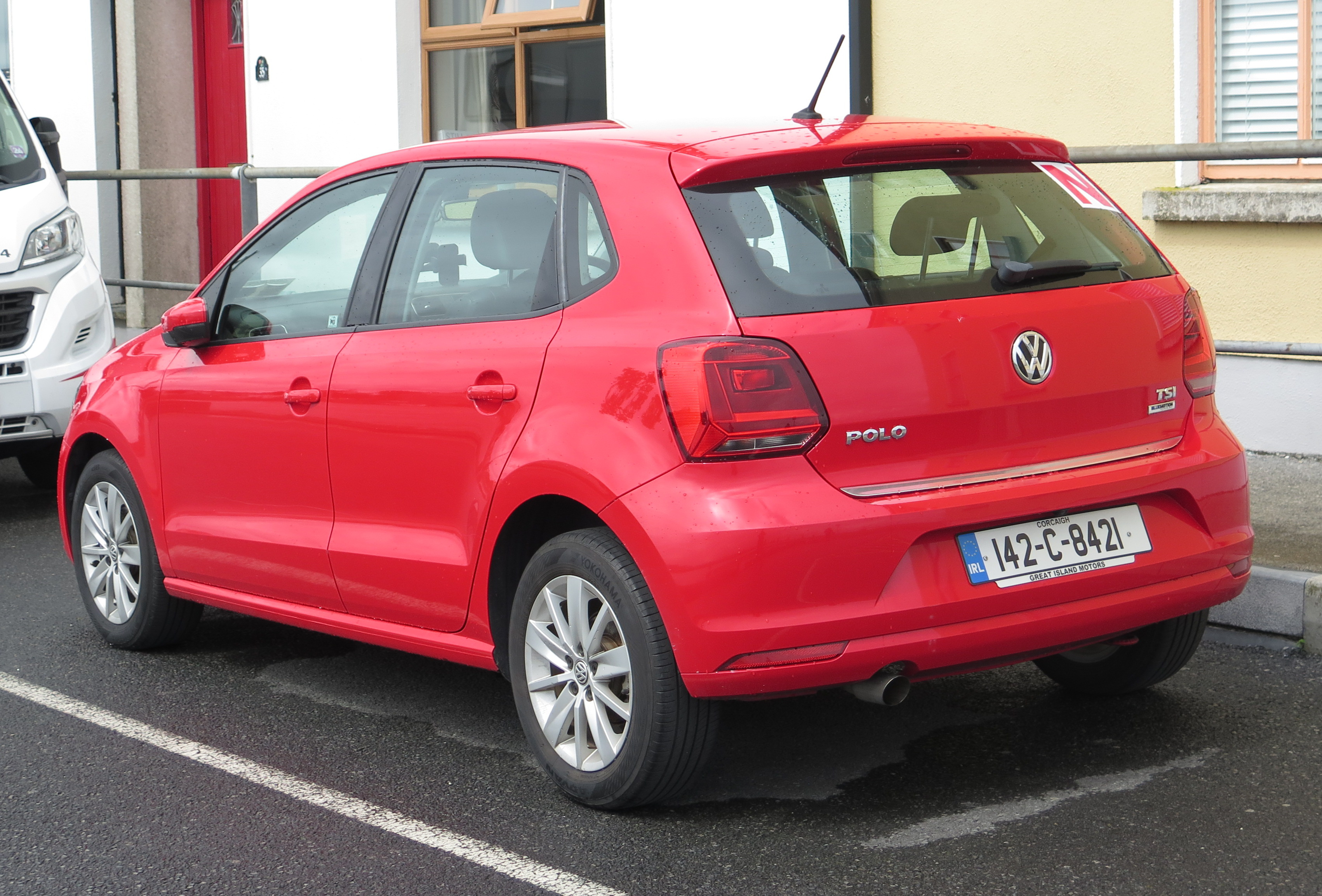
Volkswagen Polo (first facelift)

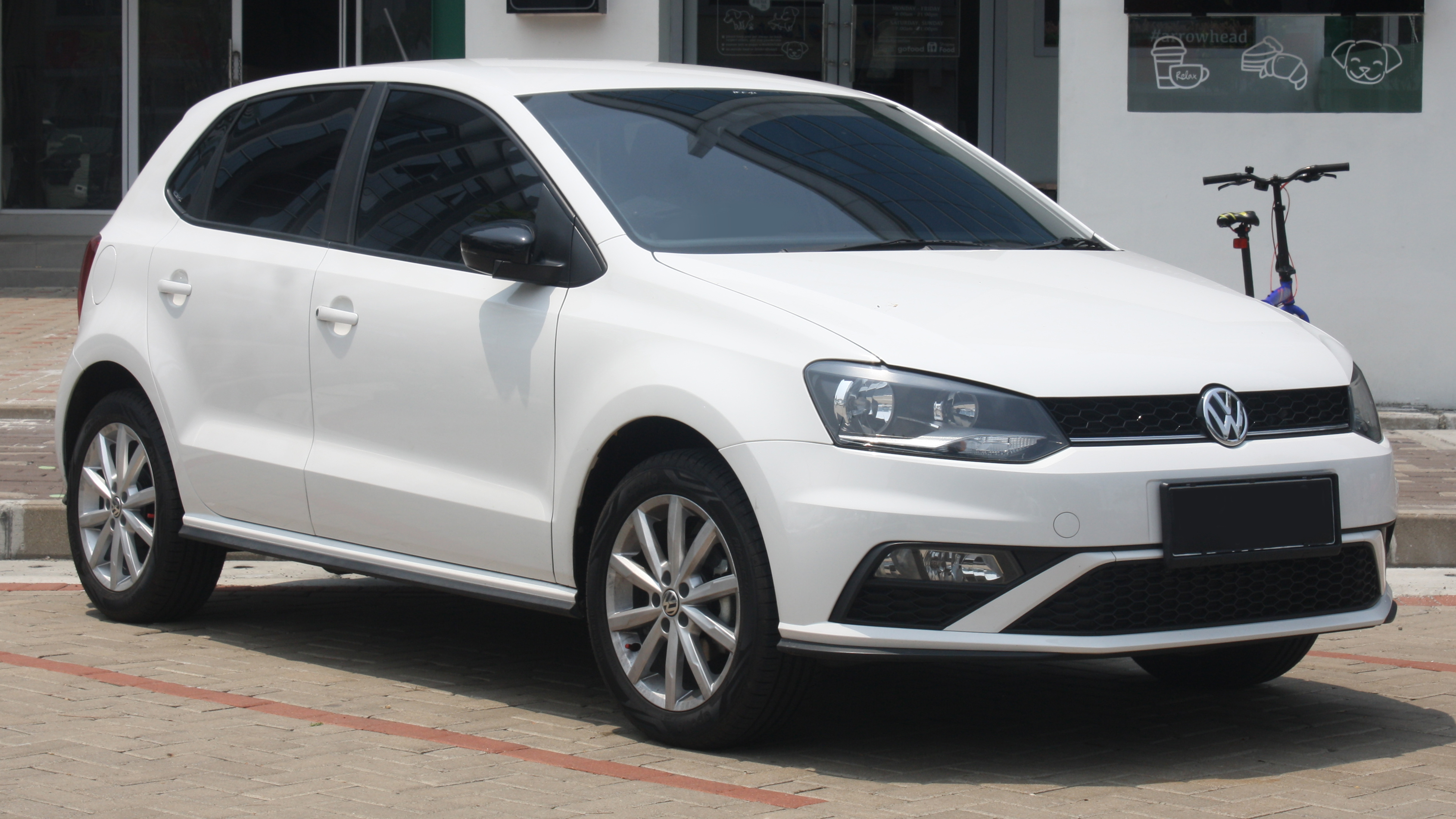
2021 Volkswagen Polo (second facelift; Indonesia)

== Polo Vivo (South Africa) ==
The Polo Mk5 was relaunched in South Africa in February 2018 as the Polo Vivo. It replaced the Polo Mk4-based Polo Vivo and sold alongside the Polo Mk6 as a budget-friendly option. The Polo Vivo is offered in four trim levels including Trendline, Comfortline, Highline, and GT. Two 4-cylinder petrol engines are offered, a 1.4-litre and a 1.6-litre naturally aspirated engines, as well as the 1.0-litre turbocharged 3-cylinder petrol engine. 5-speed manual gearboxes are available for the naturally aspirated variants, while a Tiptronic auto is available in the 105 PS (104 hp; 77 kW) 1.6 model. The 1.0 GT model comes with a 6-speed manual transmission. The CrossPolo variant of the Polo Mk5 has been repackaged as the Polo Vivo Maxx. It is mostly the same as before except for different style wheels.

== Sedan versions ==
=== Volkswagen Vento/Polo sedan ===
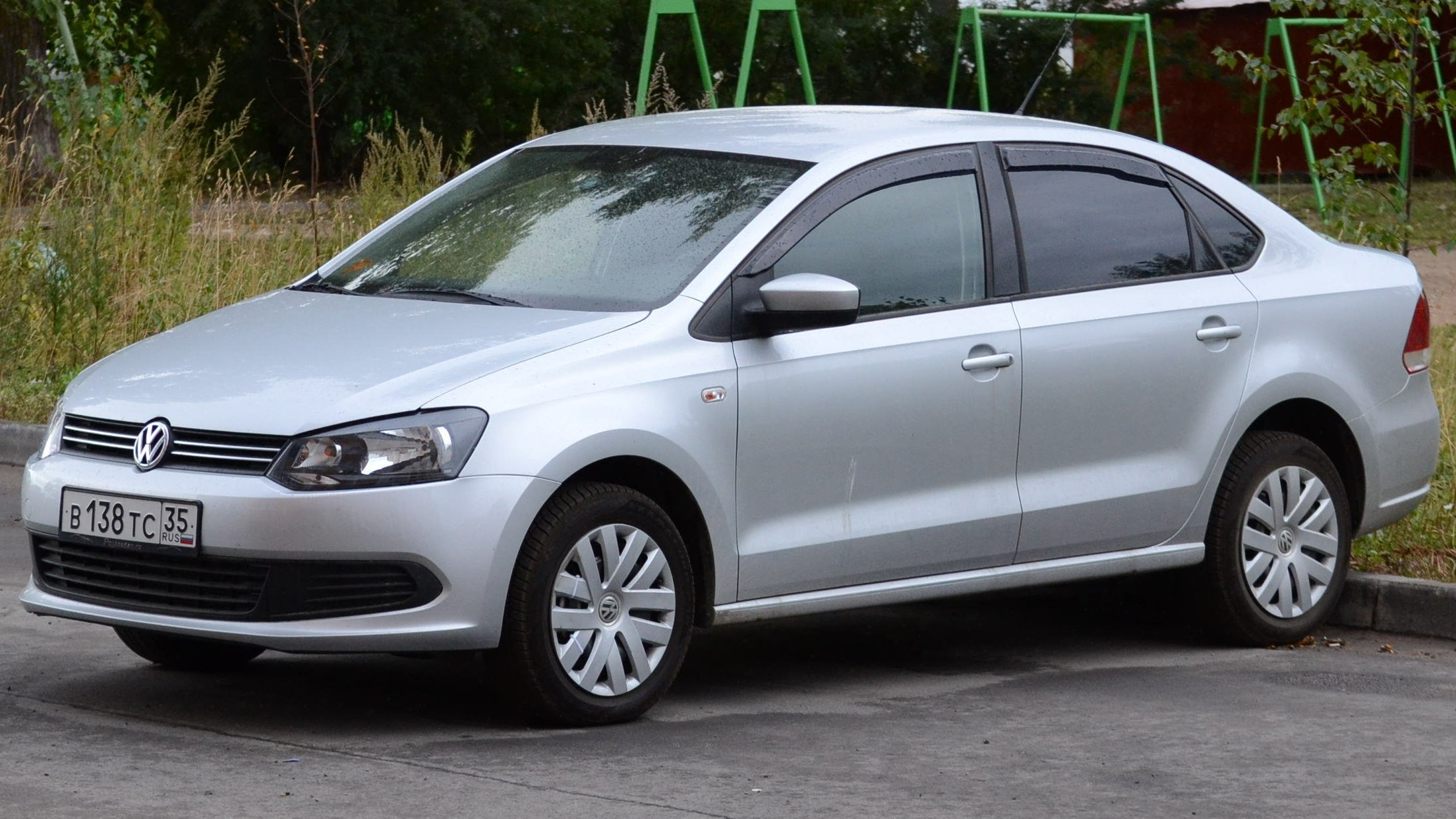
Volkswagen Polo Sedan (Russia)

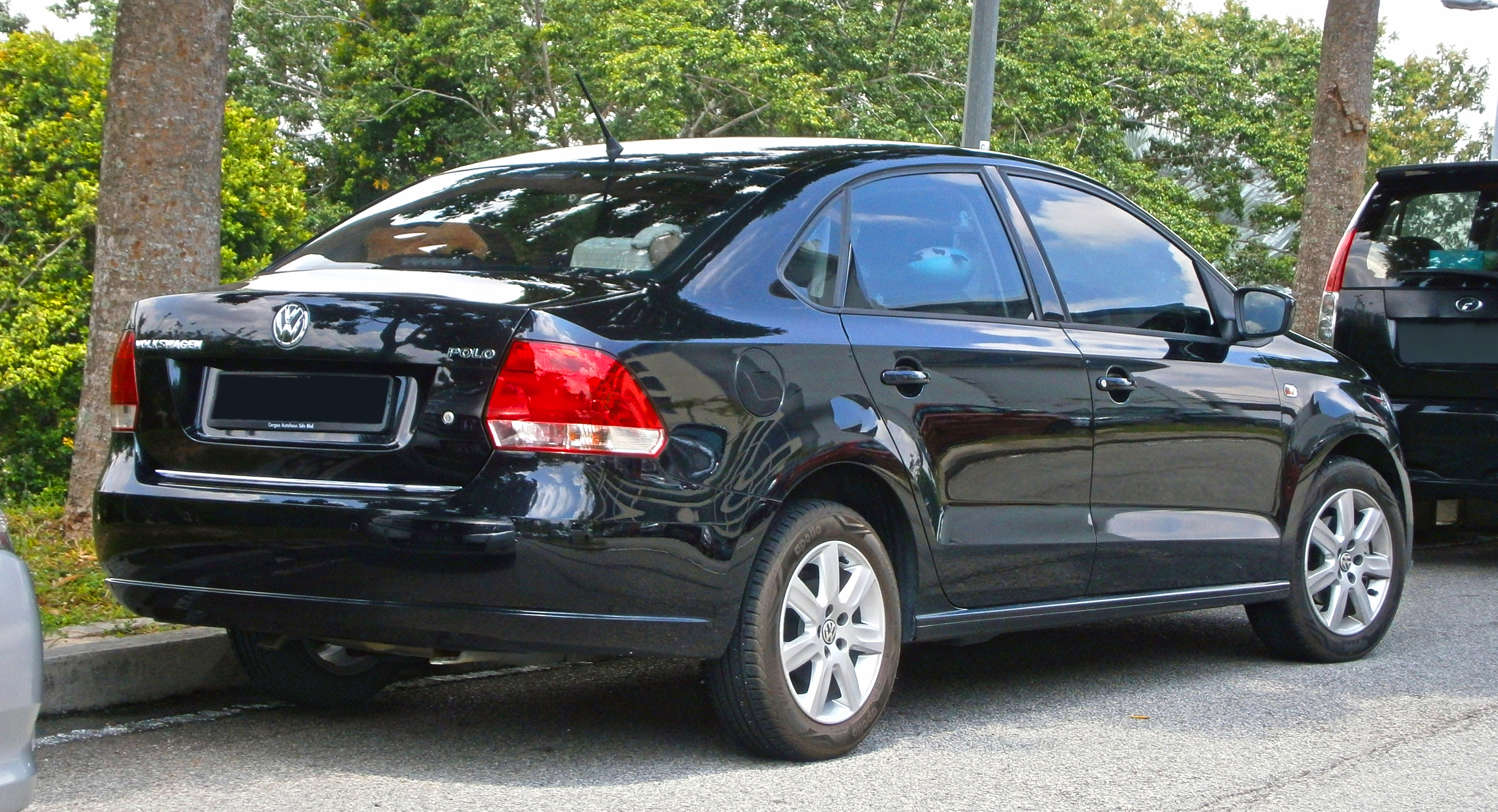
Volkswagen Polo sedan (Malaysia)

A three-box sedan version of the Polo Mk5 was introduced in 2010. It is known as the Vento in India, Malaysia, Brunei and Mexico. In South Africa, Argentina, Russia, and the Middle East, it is sold as the Polo Sedan. The word Vento means 'wind' in both Italian and Portuguese. It is also known as the Polo Notch in the Philippines.

The Polo sedan or Vento was introduced in India and Russia in 2010, followed by South Africa in May 2011.

The vehicle features an increased wheelbase of 2,552 mm (100.5 in) and a ground clearance 168–170 mm (6.6–6.7 in). The extra 82 mm (3.2 in) wheelbase offers more rear legroom than the hatchback, while the three-box design generates additional trunk space of 500 litres (18 ft^{3}).

In several markets, it is succeeded by the Volkswagen Virtus, while some markets like Mexico offered the Virtus alongside the Vento for the purpose of keeping a budget-friendly option.

==== Mexico ====
A Mexican version of the Vento was released for the 2014 model year, imported from India. Trim levels are called Style, Active and Highline. VW offers a choice of two engine options: a 1.6-litre naturally aspirated gasoline engine coupled with either a 5-speed manual or a 6-speed automatic gearbox, and a 1.6-litre diesel (TDI) engine coupled with a 5-speed manual gearbox.

In 2016, Volkswagen redesigned the front so it resembled the (at the time) new Jetta (Mk7): grille, fascia, fog lights and chrome inserts. It also got visible exhaust and redesigned headlights. The 2016 model also got a 7-speed dual-clutch automatic DSG gearbox for the Diesel engine. The Volkswagen Vento since 2016 has been the best-selling model of the Volkswagen brand and the third best-selling model overall in Mexico.

In the Mexican market, the facelifted Vento arrived in 2020.

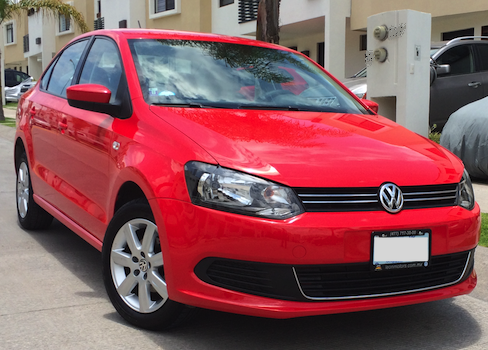
2014 Volkswagen Vento (pre-facelift; Mexico)

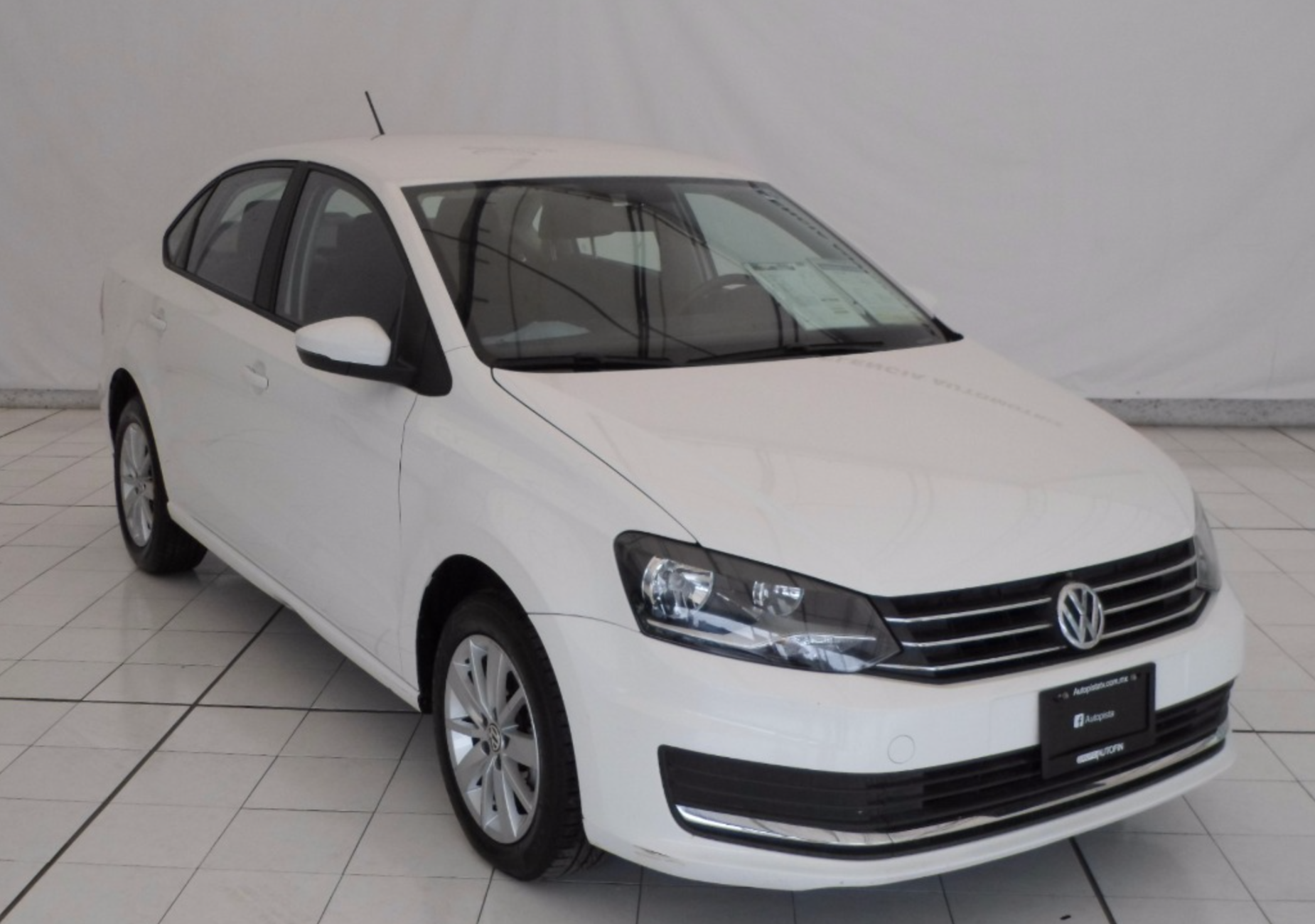
2016–2020 Volkswagen Vento (first facelift; Mexico)

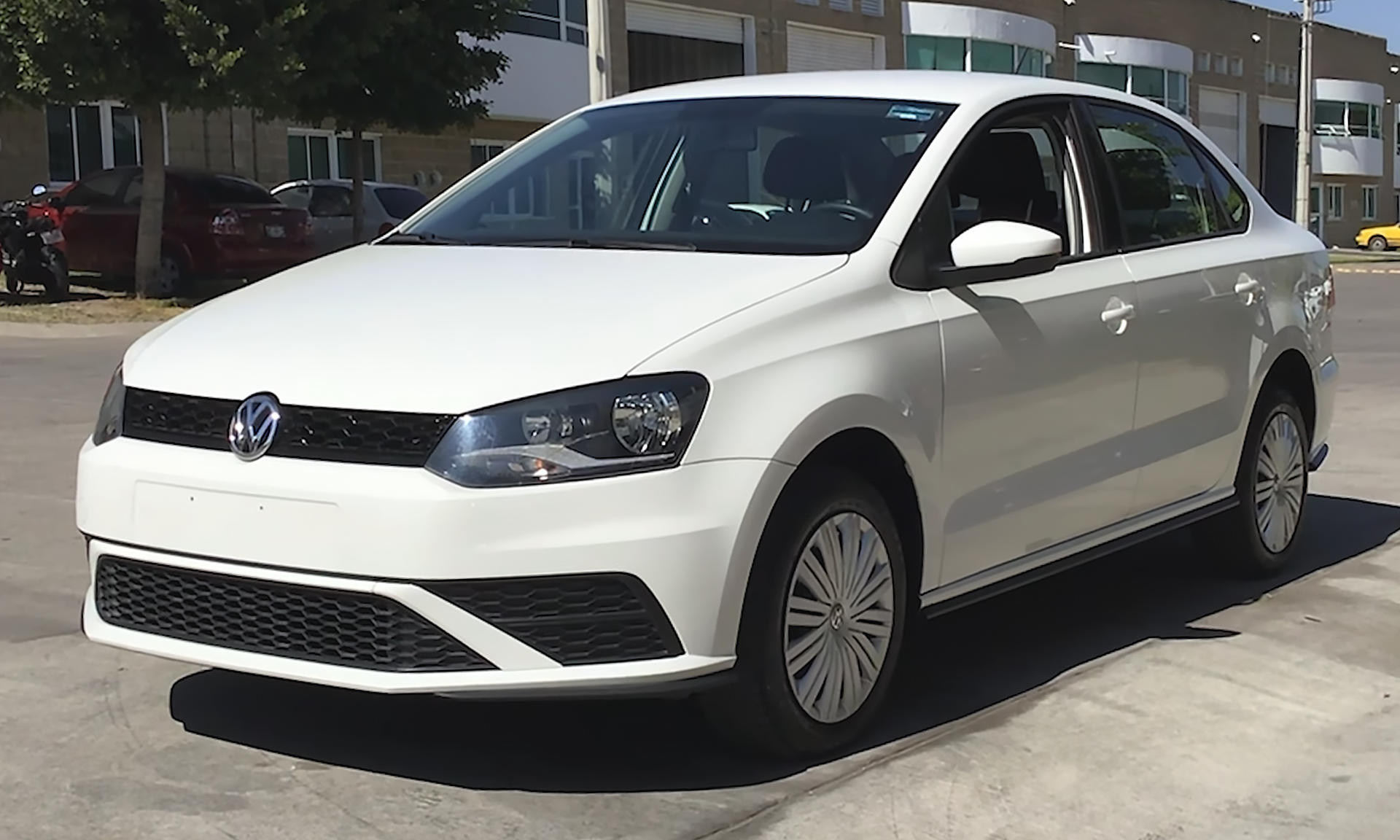
2020 Volkswagen Vento (second facelift; Mexico)

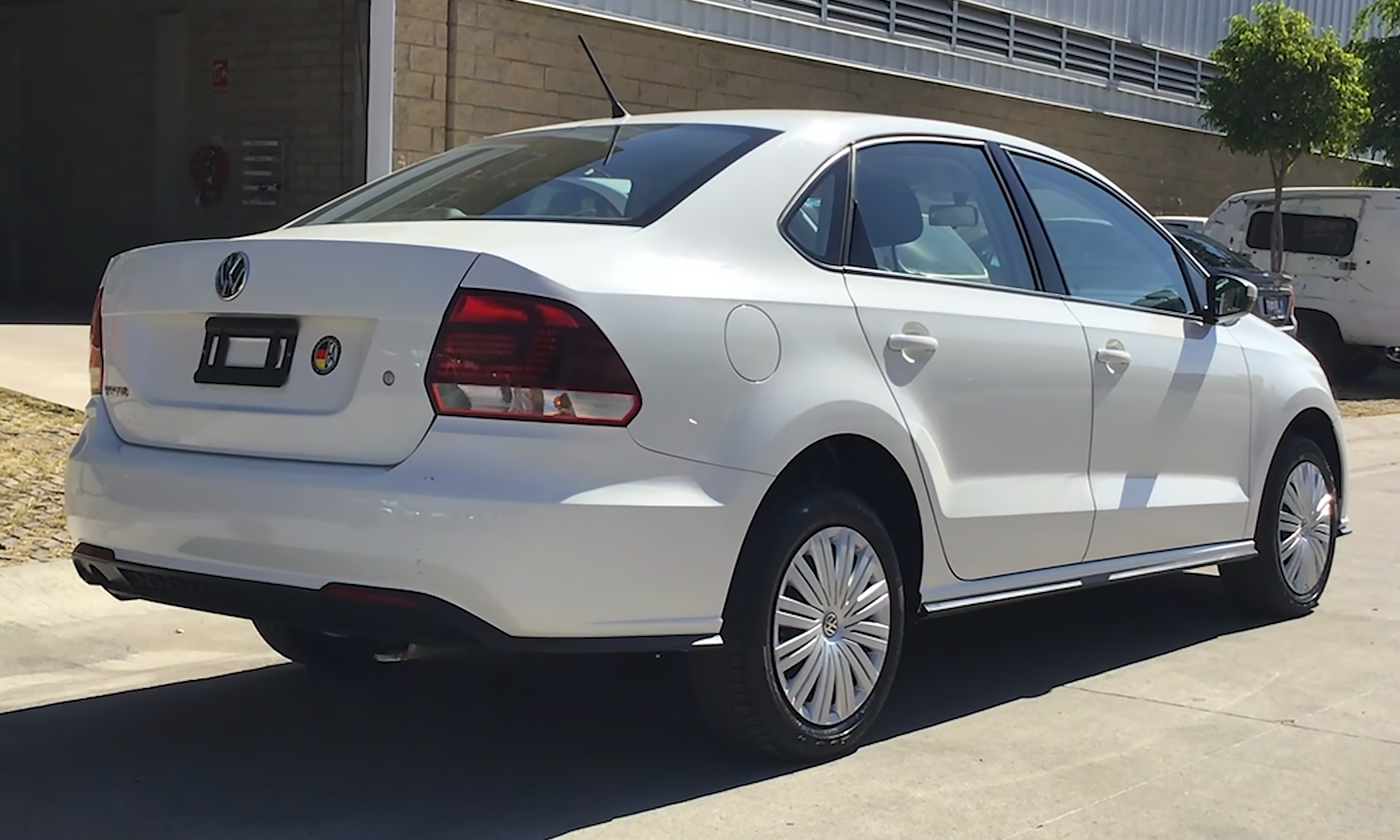
2020 Volkswagen Vento (second facelift; Mexico)

==== India ====
At its introduction, the Vento in India was available in four trim levels: the base Trendline, Comfortline, Highline and Highline Plus, with the Highline and Highline Plus also having an automatic option. The Comfortline gets a CD-MP3 music system, body-coloured door mirrors and handles and fog lamps among other features. The Highline features a Touchscreen Infotainment system with integrated USB music, steering-mounted audio controls, leather upholstery, ABS, front airbags, a multi-function display, 15-inch alloy wheels and other standard features. The Highline Plus has a 16-inch (410 mm) alloy wheels, a reverse parking camera and full LED headlamps with LED daytime running lights.

In November 2011, Škoda in India introduced the Rapid which is a rebadged and restyled Vento. The front end design of the Rapid adopts Škoda family's design philosophy instead. Compared to the Vento, the Rapid lacks a 1.2 TSI engine option, and also lacks a DSG transmission option and uses a more traditional 6-speed torque converter instead.

In 2011, VW introduced a special edition called the "Breeze" on the Trendline trim, featuring added accessories. In collaboration with the Indian Premier League authorities, Volkswagen India also offers a special IPL edition alongside the Vento Breeze

The model is offered with one petrol engine, which is a 1.6-litre 4-cylinder MPI engine producing 105 PS (104 hp; 77 kW) coupled with either 5-speed manual or 6-speed automatic gearbox; and one diesel engine (1.6 L, turbocharged 4-cylinder common rail, 105 PS (104 hp; 77 kW) with only 5-speed manual gearbox) options available. In November 2013, the 1.6-litre petrol and 6-speed automatic option was dropped in favour of the new 1.2-litre, 4-cylinder TSI motor mated to a 7-speed DSG dual clutch automatic. This combination offers superior performance and fuel efficiency compared to the old automatic offering.

In 2014, a facelifted Vento was launched. It carries over the 1.6-litre petrol but has a new 1.5-litre diesel engine derived from the old 1.6-litre due to the excise benefits offered to engines 1.5L and below, in India). The Vento also gets a 7-speed DSG gearbox, with this new 1.5-litre engine. A 1.2-litre TSI engine is also available mated to the 7-speed DSG, producing 103PS.

Along with the Polo, the facelifted version of the Vento was released on 3 September 2019 in India alongside the facelifted Polo. Its styling mimics the Polo GTI version, sharing the same front bumper. The only engine option available is a 1.0-litre TSI motor that puts out 110 hp (82 kW) and 175 N⋅m (129 lb⋅ft) of torque. Available gearboxes are 6-speed manual transmission and 6-speed tiptronic.

In India, the facelifted version was released in September 2019 whilst older versions of them will be kept on sale for a few years. It is very similar to its GTI version in terms of design and it will be expanded for most markets where the Polo saloon and hatchback versions are sold. Both the Polo and Vento were later facelifted in Mexico in early 2020.

On introduction of Bharat Stage VI emissions norms in India in April 2020, the Vento 1.5 TDI was discontinued and the petrol engines replaced by a new locally manufactured, more fuel-efficient three-cylinder 1.0 TSI engine.

==== Philippines ====
The Polo sedan Mk5 is also known as the Volkswagen Polo Notch in the Philippines. It went on sale in late 2013 and was sourced from India. In May 2018, Volkswagen discontinued the Polo Notch in the Philippines. It was replaced by the Chinese-sourced Volkswagen Santana.

==== Other markets ====
The car became available in Argentina as the Polo Sedan from October 2015 to February 2018, when it was replaced by the Virtus sourced from Brazil.

=== Volkswagen Ameo ===
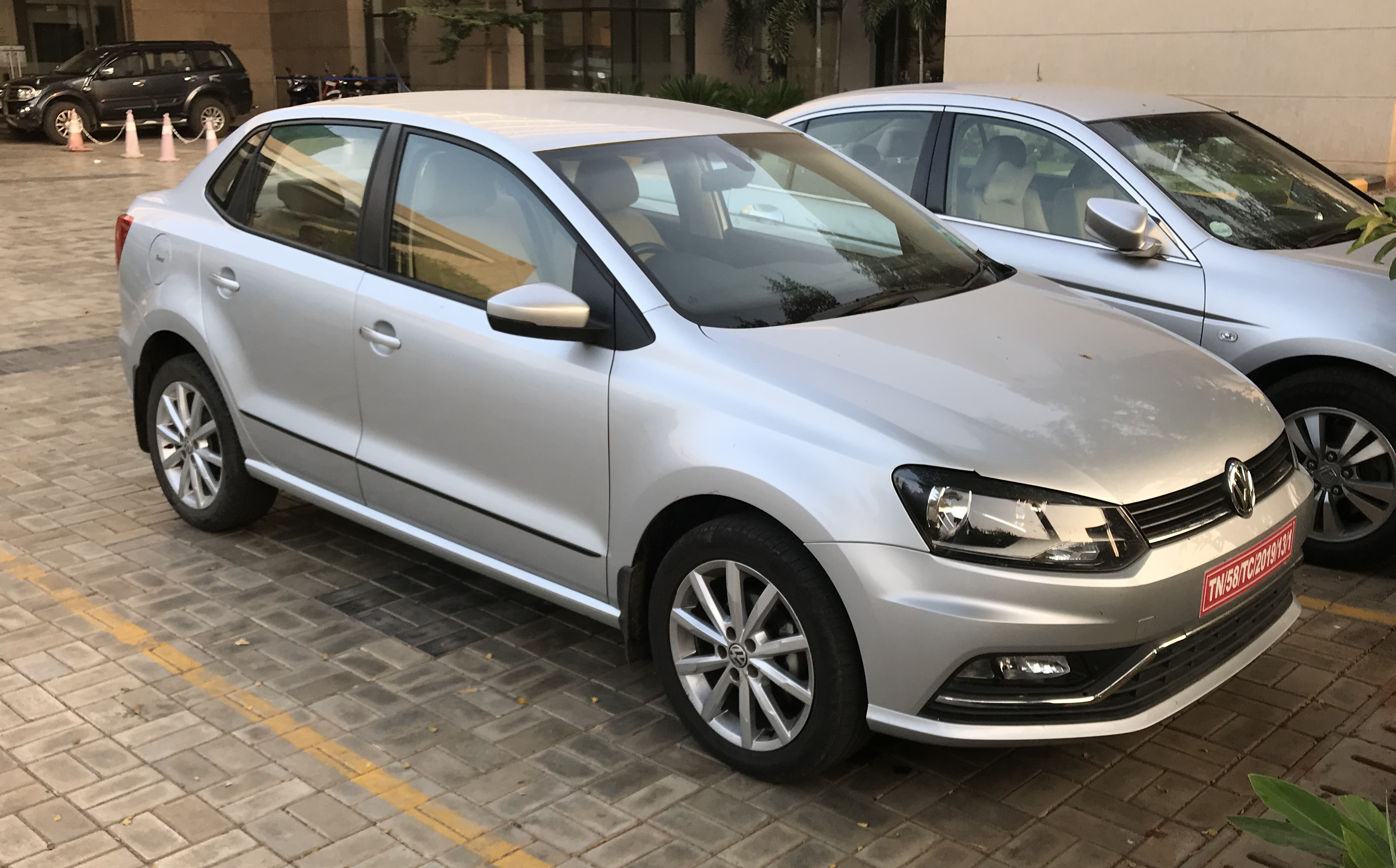

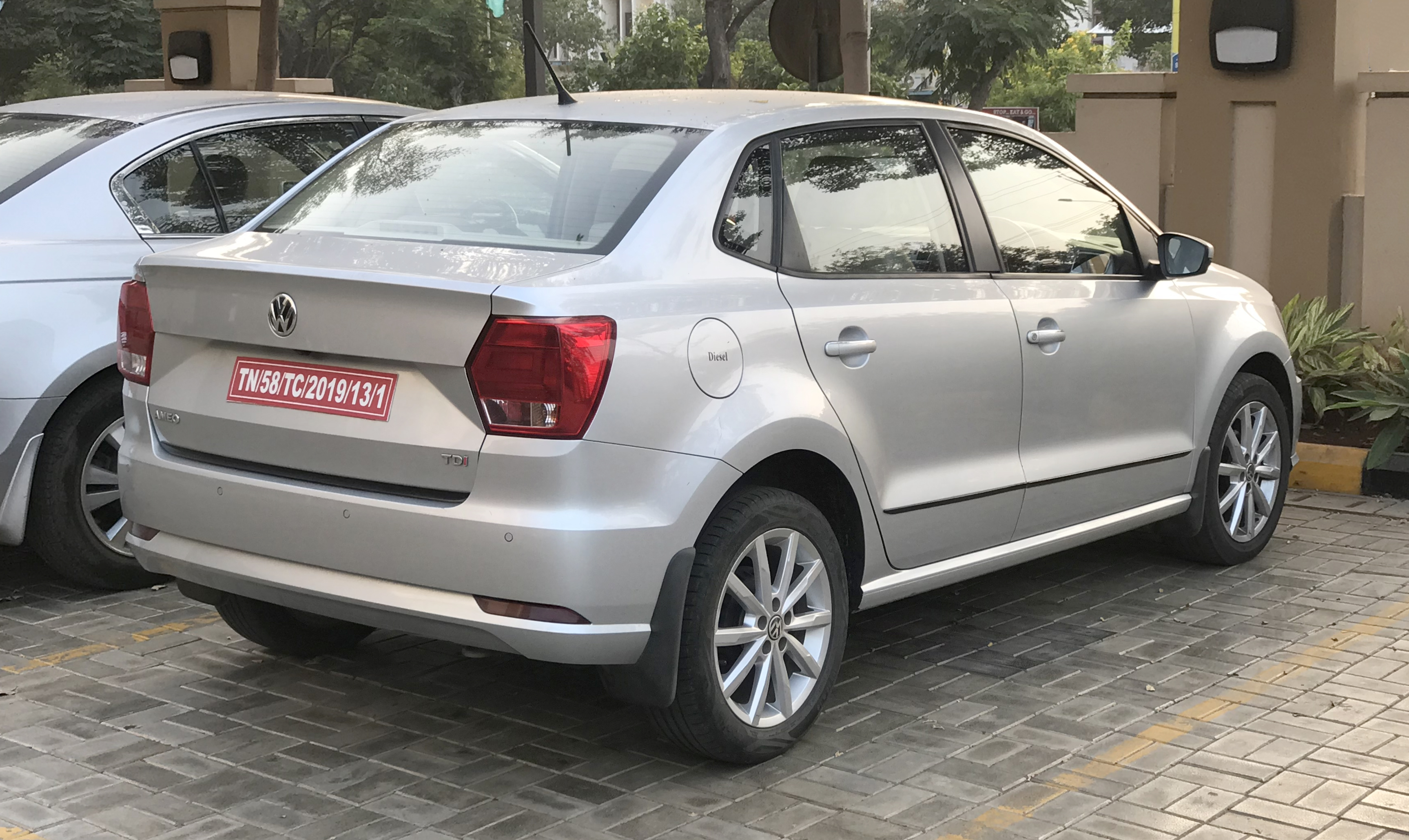
Volkswagen Ameo

The Ameo is a notchback sedan based on the hatchback Polo Mk5 which was introduced for the Indian market in June 2016. Slotted between the Polo and the Vento, the Ameo was developed to fit the tax bracket for vehicles under 4,000 mm (157.5 in) in length in order to occupy the sub-four metre sedan segment in India. It was produced in India and was marketed. The word 'Ameo' is derived from the Latin word 'amo', meaning love.

The Ameo retained 2,470 mm (97.2 in) wheelbase and the rear doors from the Polo hatchback, unlike the Polo sedan/Vento. It is also fitted with a shorter front bumper which shaved 35 mm (1.4 in) from the length of the vehicle, and a lower roof. According to Tilo Klumpp, a senior designer at Volkswagen, initial design proposals of the Ameo resembles a shape of a fastback, with an tailgate sloping from the roofline to the trailing edge. However, market research showed that Indian customers preferred a traditional three-box shape. Development reportedly took two and a half years.

During its introduction to the Indian market, the Ameo is equipped with a 1.2-litre three-cylinder naturally aspirated petrol engine and a 1.5-litre four-cylinder turbocharged diesel engine. The 1.2-litre petrol engine was phased out and was replaced by the new 1.0-litre, three cylinder naturally aspirated petrol engine from the Polo which produces 75 bhp (56 kW) of power at 6,200 rpm with peak torque of 95 N⋅m (70 lbf⋅ft). The diesel variant is a 1.5-litre TDI four cylinder engine, that develops 108 hp (81 kW) at 4,000 rpm and 250 N⋅m (184 lbf⋅ft) of peak torque. It was available in five variants which include Trendline, Comfortline, Comfortline Plus, Highline and Highline Plus.

The Ameo was discontinued in April 2020, as the vehicle was not updated to be compliant with the Bharat Stage 6 emission norms, which came into force in that month, due to its decreasing sales.

== Powertrain ==
Petrol engines
Model	Engine	Power at rpm	Torque at rpm	0–100 km/h (0-62 mph) acceleration	Top speed	Transmission	CO_{2} emissions
1.0	999 cc (61.0 cu in) I3	60 PS (44 kW; 59 hp) at 5,000	95 N⋅m (70 lb⋅ft) at 3,000	15.5s	161 km/h (100 mph)	5-spd manual	106 g/km
1.0	999 cc (61.0 cu in) I3	75 PS (55 kW; 74 hp) at 6,200	95 N⋅m (70 lb⋅ft) at 3,000	14.3s	174 km/h (108 mph)	5-spd manual	108 g/km
1.2	1,198 cc (73.1 cu in) I3	60 PS (44 kW; 59 hp) at 5,200	108 N⋅m (80 lb⋅ft) at 3,000	15.8s	157 km/h (98 mph)	5-spd manual	128 g/km
1.2	1,198 cc (73.1 cu in) I3	70 PS (51 kW; 69 hp) at 5,400	112 N⋅m (83 lb⋅ft) at 3,000	14.1s	165 km/h (103 mph)	5-spd manual	128 g/km
1.4	1,390 cc (85 cu in) I4	85 PS (63 kW; 84 hp) at 5,000	132 N⋅m (97 lb⋅ft) at 3,800	11.9s	177 km/h (110 mph)	5-spd manual, 7-spd DSG (optional)	139 g/km 135 g/km
1.2 TSI	1,197 cc (73.0 cu in) turbo I4	105 PS (77 kW; 104 hp) at 5,000	175 N⋅m (129 lb⋅ft) at 1,550-4,100	9.7s	190 km/h (118 mph)	6-spd manual, 7-spd DSG (optional)	124 g/km 124 g/km
1.2 TSI	1,197 cc (73.0 cu in) turbo I4	90 PS (66 kW; 89 hp) at 4,500	160 N⋅m (118 lb⋅ft) at 1,500-3,500	10.9s	182 km/h (113 mph)	5-spd manual, 7-spd DSG (optional)	119 g/km 124 g/km
BlueGT	1,395 cc (85.1 cu in) turbo I4	140 PS (103 kW; 138 hp) at 4,500-6,000	250 N⋅m (184 lb⋅ft) at 1,500-3,500	7.9s	210 km/h (130 mph)	6-spd manual, 7-spd DSG (optional)	107 g/km 105 g/km
GTI	1,390 cc (85 cu in) twincharger I4	180 PS (132 kW; 178 hp) at 6,200	250 N⋅m (184 lb⋅ft) at 2,000-4,500	6.9s	229 km/h (142 mph)	7-spd DSG	139 g/km
1.6	1,598 cc (97.5 cu in) I4	105 PS (77 kW; 104 hp) at 5,250	153 N⋅m (113 lb⋅ft) at 3,750	11.1s	184 km/h (114 mph)	5-spd manual	157 g/km
GTI 2015-17	1,798 cc (109.7 cu in) turbo I4	192 PS (141 kW; 189 hp) at 4,300-6,200	320 N⋅m (236 lb⋅ft) at 1,450-4,200 (manual), 250 N⋅m (184 lb⋅ft) at 1,250-5,300 (DSG)	6.7s	235 km/h (146 mph)	6-spd manual, 7-spd DSG (optional)	129 g/km
R WRC	1,984 cc (121.1 cu in) turbo I4	220 PS (162 kW; 217 hp) at 4,500-6,300	350 N⋅m (258 lb⋅ft) at 2,500-4,400	6.4s	243 km/h (151 mph)	6-spd manual	174 g/km

In addition to the engine options above, BlueMotion Technology versions of the 1.2 TSI are available on some markets. The reduces CO_{2} emission to 113 g/km for the 90 PS (66 kW; 89 hp) with manual transmission and 115 g/km for the 105 PS (77 kW; 104 hp) in manual and DSG variants.
At the end of 2012, the BlueGT variant has been officially introduced. The Polo BlueGT features improved aerodynamics and a 1.4 turbocharged TSI engine from the new EA211 generation. This new engine features ACT (Active Cylinder Technology), a cylinder deactivation management which deactivates two cylinders at torque outputs from 24 to 100 N·m, allowing the Polo BlueGT with a 6-speed manual transmission to emit only 107 g/km.

In 2013, Volkswagen entered the World Rally Championship with a new Polo-based rally car. To meet the homologation requirements, 2500 Polo R WRCs were produced between September 2013 and March 2014.

Diesel engines
Model	Engine	Power at rpm	Torque at rpm	0–100 km/h (0-62 mph) acceleration	Top speed	Transmission	CO_{2} emissions
1.2 TDI BlueMotion	1,199 cc (73.2 cu in) turbo I3	75 PS (55 kW; 74 hp) at 4,200	180 N⋅m (133 lb⋅ft) at 2,000	13.9s	173 km/h (107 mph)	5-spd manual	87 g/km
1.2 TDI	1,199 cc (73.2 cu in) turbo I3	75 PS (55 kW; 74 hp) at 4,200	180 N⋅m (133 lb⋅ft) at 2,000	13.9s	170 km/h (106 mph)	5-spd manual	99 g/km
1.4 TDI	1,422 cc (86.8 cu in) turbo I3 CUSA, CYZB	75 PS (55 kW; 74 hp) at 3,750	210 N⋅m (155 lb⋅ft) at 2,000	12,9s	173 km/h (107 mph)	5-spd manual	88 g/km
1.4 TDI BlueMotion	1,422 cc (86.8 cu in) turbo I3 CUSA, CYZB	75 PS (55 kW; 74 hp) at 3,750	210 N⋅m (155 lb⋅ft) at 2,000	12,9s	178 km/h (111 mph)	5-spd manual	82 g/km
1.4 TDI	1,422 cc (86.8 cu in) turbo I3	90 PS (66 kW; 89 hp) at 3,500	230 N⋅m (170 lb⋅ft) at 2,500	10.9s	184 km/h (114 mph)	5-spd manual, 7-spd DSG (optional)	88 g/km
1.4 TDI	1,422 cc (86.8 cu in) turbo I3	105 PS (77 kW; 104 hp) at 3,750	250 N⋅m (180 lb⋅ft) at 2,500	9.9s	194 km/h (121 mph)	5-spd manual	90 g/km
1.5 TDI	1498cc (91.4 cu in) turbo I4	90PS (66 kW;89 hp) at 4,200	230 N.m (170 lb.ft) at 1,500-2,500	-	-	5-spd manual	-
1.5 TDI	1489cc (91.4 cu in) turbo I4	110PS ( 81 kW; 108 hp) at 4,000: GT TDI	250 N.m ( 184 lb.ft) at 1,500-3,000	-	-	5-spd manual	-
1.6 TDI	1,598 cc (97.5 cu in) turbo I4	75 PS (55 kW; 74 hp) at 4,000	195 N⋅m (144 lb⋅ft) at 1,500–2,500	13.9s	170 km/h (106 mph)	5-spd manual	109 g/km
1.6 TDI	1,598 cc (97.5 cu in) turbo I4	90 PS (66 kW; 89 hp) at 4,200	230 N⋅m (170 lb⋅ft) at 1,500–2,500	11.5s	180 km/h (112 mph)	5-spd manual, 7-spd DSG (optional)	109 g/km 112 g/km
1.6 TDI	1,598 cc (97.5 cu in) turbo I4	105 PS (77 kW; 104 hp) at 4,400	250 N⋅m (184 lb⋅ft) at 1,500–2,500	10.4s	189 km/h (117 mph)	5-spd manual	109 g/km
1.6 TDI BlueMotion	1,598 cc (97.5 cu in) turbo I4	90 PS (66 kW; 89 hp) at 4,200	230 N⋅m (170 lb⋅ft) at 1,500–2,500	11.5s	180 km/h (112 mph)	5-spd manual	96 g/km

Anecdotal reports have appeared of problems with the 66 kW diesel engine, including poor fuel consumption and surging. VW has already made one modification to the particle filter ECU mapping.

== Safety ==
- Euro NCAP: 5 stars (Outdated, this model has not been rated by Euro NCAP)

=== Global NCAP ===
The Polo for India with no airbags and no ABS received 0 stars for adult occupants and 3 stars for toddlers from Global NCAP 1.0 in 2014 (similar to Latin NCAP 2013).

Global NCAP 1.0 test results (India) Volkswagen Polo – 0 Airbags (2014, similar to Latin NCAP 2013)
Test	Score	Stars
Adult occupant protection	0.00/17.00	0 /5 stars
Child occupant protection	26.97/49.00	3 /5 stars

The Polo for India with 2 airbags and no ABS received 4 stars for adult occupants and 3 stars for toddlers from Global NCAP 1.0 in 2014 (similar to Latin NCAP 2013).

Global NCAP 1.0 test results (India) Volkswagen Polo (*) – 2 Airbags (2014, similar to Latin NCAP 2013)
Test	Score	Stars
Adult occupant protection	12.54/17.00	4 /5 stars
Child occupant protection	29.91/49.00	3 /5 stars

The Polo Vivo for Africa received 3 stars for adult occupants and 3 stars for toddlers from Global NCAP 1.0 in 2017 (based on Latin NCAP 2013).

The Indian-made Polo sedan in its most basic version for Latin America received 5 stars for adult occupants and 3 stars for toddlers from Latin NCAP 1.0 in 2015.

=== ANCAP ===
ANCAP test results* Volkswagen Polo variant(s) as tested (2010)
Test	Score
Overall	5 /5 stars
Frontal offset	14.98/16
Side impact	15.98/16
Pole	2/2
Seat belt reminders	2/3
Whiplash protection	Not Assessed
Pedestrian protection	Marginal
Electronic stability control	Standard

ANCAP test results* Volkswagen Polo all petrol variants (2011)
Test	Score
Overall	5 /5 stars
Frontal offset	14.98/16
Side impact	15.98/16
Pole	2/2
Seat belt reminders	2/3
Whiplash protection	Adequate
Pedestrian protection	Marginal
Electronic stability control	Standard

== Polo Wörthersee 09 ==
A one-off Polo concept car was shown at the Wörthersee GTI meeting in May 2009. Considered as a preview of a future Polo GTI model, the car featured Flash Red paint with black rally stripes, 18-inch "Budapest" wheels, high gloss black interior and aluminum tread plates.

== Polo R WRC ==
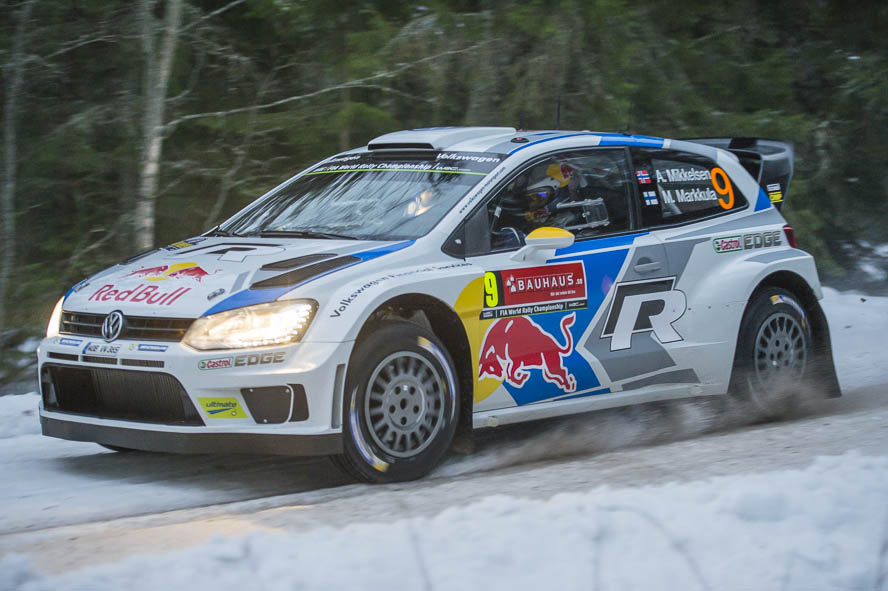
Volkswagen Polo R WRC in 2014 Rally Sweden

In 2013, Volkswagen entered the World Rally Championship with the Volkswagen Polo R WRC, a new rally car based on the Polo. For homologation purposes, 2,500 Polo R WRC street cars were produced between September 2013 and March 2014. The street version features a 2.0 litre turbocharged engine producing 220 PS, and is mated exclusively to 6-speed manual gearbox.

== Awards ==
- European Car of the Year 2010
- Slovenian Car of the Year 2010
- South African Car of the Year 2011
- Japan Import Car of the Year 2010–2011
- World Car of the Year 2010
- What Car? Supermini of the Year 2010
- Drive Car of the Year 2010 (Australia)
- Carsguide Car of the Year 2010 (Australia)
- Wheels Car of the Year 2010

== See also ==
- Volkswagen Polo for an overview of all models
- Volkswagen Polo Mk1
- Volkswagen Polo Mk2
- Volkswagen Polo Mk3
- Volkswagen Polo Mk4
- Volkswagen Polo Mk6
- Volkswagen Vento (A05)
- Volkswagen Polo R WRC

Preceded by Volkswagen Polo Mk4	Volkswagen Polo Mk5; 2009–present	Succeeded by Volkswagen Polo Mk6
