= Firangoji Narsala =

Maratha warrior and military leader

General of Maratha Army
- Monarch: Shivaji I

Personal details
- Occupation: Kiladar of Chakan

Military service
- Allegiance: Maratha Empire
- Service: Maratha Army
- Battles/wars: Battle of Chakan

Firangoji Narsale was a Maratha warrior and military leader in the army of Shivaji Maharaj, in 17th century India. He is famous for his defence of Sangram Durg, a fort, against a Mughal army led by Shaista Khan in 1660 .

Firangoji was a 'Killedar' (fortress commander) of this fort in Chakan (Pune). When Shaista Khan invaded Pune with a lakh of soldiers, he selected Sangram Durga as the first target. He attacked the fort with 20,000 soldiers on 23 June 1660.

== Battle of Chakan ==
Firangoji Narasala was prepared for this attack, however, even though he had only 320 soldiers. Just before this attack Shivaji Maharaj had asked his commander to leave the fort. However, Firangoji decided not to abandon the fort and instead started a fierce guerrilla war against the Mughals and defended the fort in this way for 56 days. War ended on 14 August 1660.

The Mughals tried another way of taking the fort. They dug a tunnel up to the fort; which was a challenge because of the water around it. They filled this tunnel with explosives and blew up the wall of the fort. This was a major setback for Firangoji and his soldiers; 75 soldiers died in this attack. The Mughal army rushed into the fort; fierce fighting ensued and many Maratha soldiers were killed.

Shaista Khan was astonished by Firangoji's bravery, and offered him Mughal Sardari. But Firangoji refused to accept it; instead Shaista Khan gave him and his soldiers safe passage. Firangoji came to meet Shivaji and apologised for surrendering the fort. But Shivaji was very happy with him as he had defended a small fort for almost 2 months. He said "if it took 60 days for Shaista Khan to take a small fort, imagine how many days will be required to capture an entire swarajya (kingdom). Shaista Khan will be here for few days, he is not going to take Sangram Durg with him. Whatever you have done is praiseworthy".
