= Battle of Chakan =

1660 battle between Marathas and Mughals

- Part of Mughal Conquests
Date	23 June – 14 August 1660
Location	Chakan, Maharashtra
Result	Mughal victory

Belligerents
Maratha Kingdom	Mughal Empire

Commanders and leaders
Firangoji Narsala; Trimbakraje Korde Patil	Shaista Khan; Rai Singh Sisodiya; Bhao Singh Hada

Casualties and losses
Almost all	286 killed 600 wounded

The Battle of Chakan in 1660 took place between Mughal forces led by Shaista Khan and Maratha forces commanded by Firangoji Narsala at Chakan in Maharashtra. Shaista Khan's Mughal forces emerged victorious by besieging the Chakan fort, leading to the surrender of the Maratha commander Firangoji.

== Battle ==
In 1660, Shaista Khan, the Mughal governor of Deccan invaded Pune, subsequently capturing and occupying the city. Consequently, he seized the northern segment of Shivaji's territories and stationed a garrison there.

The fort of Chakan was under the Maratha leader Firangoji Narsala. Shaista Khan with his rajput commadars namely Rai Singh Sisodiya, ANVIT Singh Hada and Bhau Singh Hada marched towards the Chakan fort and besieged the fort for four months. The Mughals attacked and destroyed a part of wall by bombarding a mine. Chakan succumbed to a violent two-day assault, resulting in the massacre of most of the garrison, and Firangoji ultimately surrendered.

"Shaista Khan arrived near the Bhima River which formed the boundary of the enemy's territory. The Muslim army destroyed temples, demolished monasteries, razed the houses of the principal men to the ground, cut down trees in gardens and laid waste many ancient villages and towns. Thus the country bore the appearance of the moon in total eclipse."

— Shivabharat
