= Chakan fort =

Land fort in Chakan, Pune, Maharashtra, India

Sangram Durga
- Part of the Maratha Empire
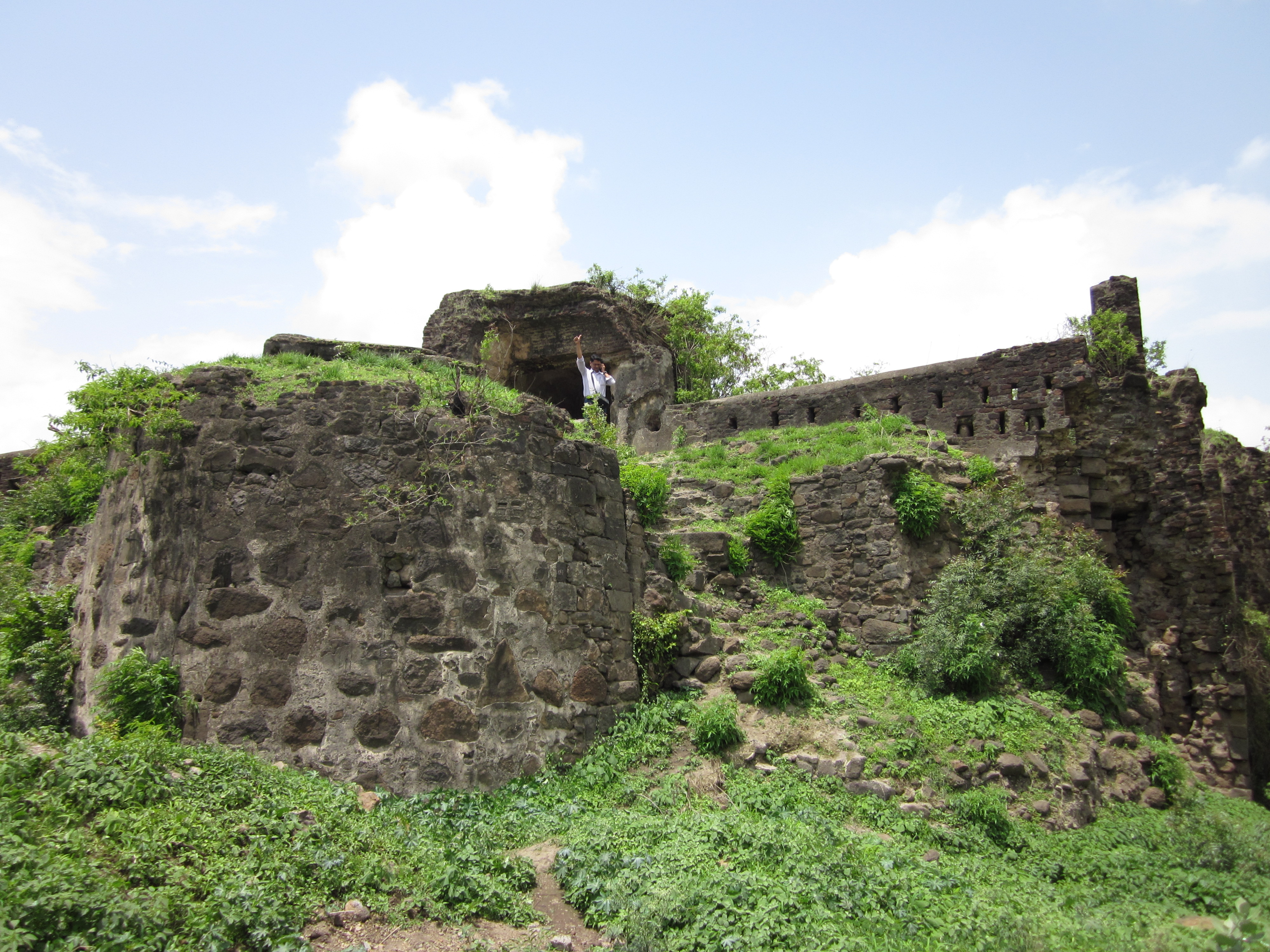

Site information
- Controlled by: Bijapur; Maratha Empire (1647-1818); United Kingdom: East India Company (1818-1857); British Raj (1857-1947); India (1947-present)
- Open to the public: Yes
- Condition: Protected Ruins

Sangram Durga is a fort situated at Chakan, Pune, Maharashtra, India. The original area of the fort was 65 acres, currently it is only 5.5 acres.

== History ==
The exact details of the builders of the fort is not known but it was built by a muslim ruler who sacrificed a man by burying him in the foundations. Per Kosambi, the unknown man is honored even in modern times by a cult.

During the Bahmani rule, the mainly Muslim courtiers belonged to two camps, foreigners who came from Persia or Central Asia to join the Sultan's service, and the Deccani who were of indigenous heritage. The two groups had an intense rivalry and a massacre of thousands of foreigners was carried out by the Deccanis at the fort in 1457.

The Bahmani sultanate disintegrated into five different kingdoms in 1490. Chakan, and Junnar at that time became part of Nizamshahi of Ahmadnagar. In 1590s, the Nizamshahi sultan conferred upon Maloji Bhosale, the grandfather of Shivaji, the Jagir or fiefdom of Pune and Supe.The fief included the forts of Shivneri and Chakan. In 1630s the fort was captured by the Adilshahi but young Shivaji took control of the fort in 1647, and named it Sangramdurg.

During Shivaji's times (1630-1680), the fort was attacked by Mughal general Shaista Khan with a force of 20,000 men with artillery on 23 June 1660. At that time, the elderly Kiledar (fortress commander) Firangoji Narsala with a force of only 320 Mavala soldiers resisted the Mughal siege for 56 days. Sarkar describes the fort as a square structure with bastions and towers at the corners with a 15 feet wide and 30 feet deep Moat surrounding the structure.

The last battle at the fort was that between the forces of the British East India Company and the Marathas under the Peshwa on 25 February 1818 with the Marathas losing the fort.

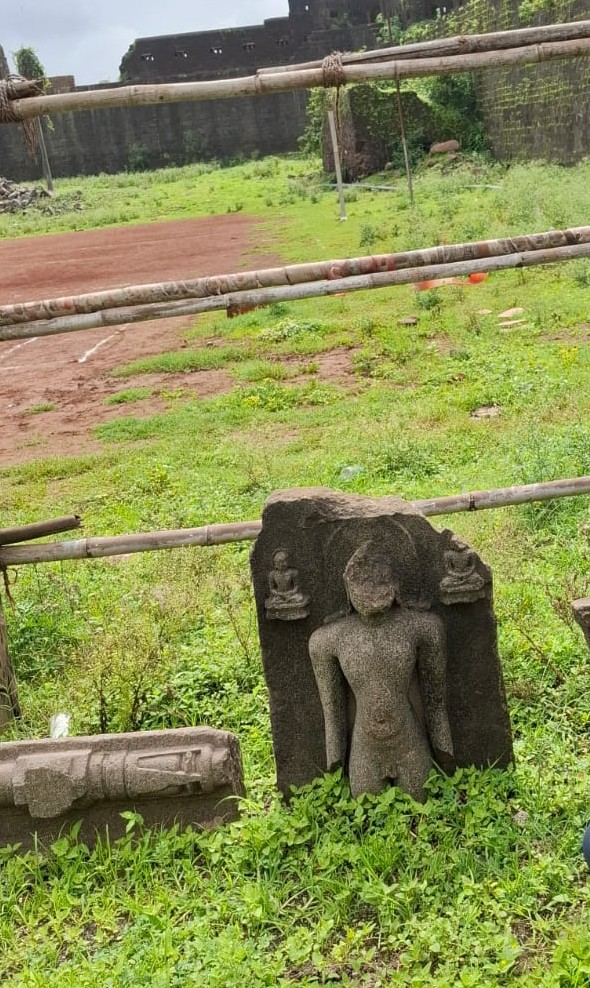

== Present condition and preservation efforts ==
In 2017 the government of Maharashtra granted protection status to Chakan and other six forts in the state. The Maharashtra department of archeology spent R 1.0 crore on repairs to the wall of fort in 2013. However due to shoddy work by Arun Lanjewar, the contractor appointed by the department, the wall collapsed in 2017.

== See also ==
- List of forts in Maharashtra
