= Chakan, Pune =

Chakan
- Town
- Location in Pune, India
- Coordinates: 18.75°N 73.85°E
- Country: India
- State: Maharashtra
- District: Pune
- Elevation: 647 m (2,123 ft)

Population (2001)
  - Total: 41,634

Languages
  - Official: Marathi
- Time zone: UTC+5:30 (IST)
- Postal code: 410501
- ISO 3166 code: IN-MH
- Website: www.chakanmc.org

Chakan (Pronunciation: [t͡saːkəɳ]) is a city and municipal council in Pune district of the Indian state of Maharashtra. The Chakan is also part of Pune Metropolitan Region Development Authority. Chakan is one of the largest automobile and manufacturing hub of India. Being developed as a hub for manufacturing and logistics by MIDC, Chakan is home to some of the biggest names in automobile manufacturing: Volkswagen, Bajaj Auto, Mercedes Benz Hyundai, and more. Chakan is often referred to as the "Automobile Hub of India". The Independent referred Chakan as India's "Motor City". The city is about 30 km from the city of Pune and 140 km from Mumbai.

== History ==
Chakan has a long history. The fort at Chakan played an important role in the history of the Bahmani sultanate (1347–1527), later of its successor states, the Deccan sultanates. In 1595 or 1599, Maloji Bhosle, the grandfather of Chhatrapati Shivaji Maharaj, was given the title of "Raja" by Bahadur Nizam Shah II, the ruler of the Ahmednagar Sultanate.On the recommendation of Nizam's Vazir, Malik Ambar, Maloji was granted the jagir (fiefdom) of Pune and Supe parganas, along with the control over Shivneri and Chakan forts. Later the fort was captured by the Adilshahi but young Chhatrapati Shivaji Maharaj took control of the fort in 1647, and named it Sangramdurg. In 1660, the fort was the site of an epic 54 days of stiff resistance by the Maratha general Firangoji Narsala against Mughal general Shaista Khan. The fort withstood heavy Mughal attacks until the Mughals breached the walls using high explosives. The attack on the fort was repulsed by the Maratha forces but short on supplies, Firangoji counterattacked and cut his way deep into the Mughal encampment where he was finally subdued and captured.

== Geography ==
Chakan is about 30 kilometres (19 mi) from the centre of Pune, on NH 50 between Pune and Nashik cities. It is also on the roads that connect the Mumbai-Pune Highway to the Pune-Nashik Highway, and to the Pune-Ahmednagar-Aurangabad Highway. It is about 150 kilometres (93 mi) from Mumbai, 120 kilometres (75 mi) from Ahmednagar and 175 kilometres (109 mi) from Nashik.

== Economy ==
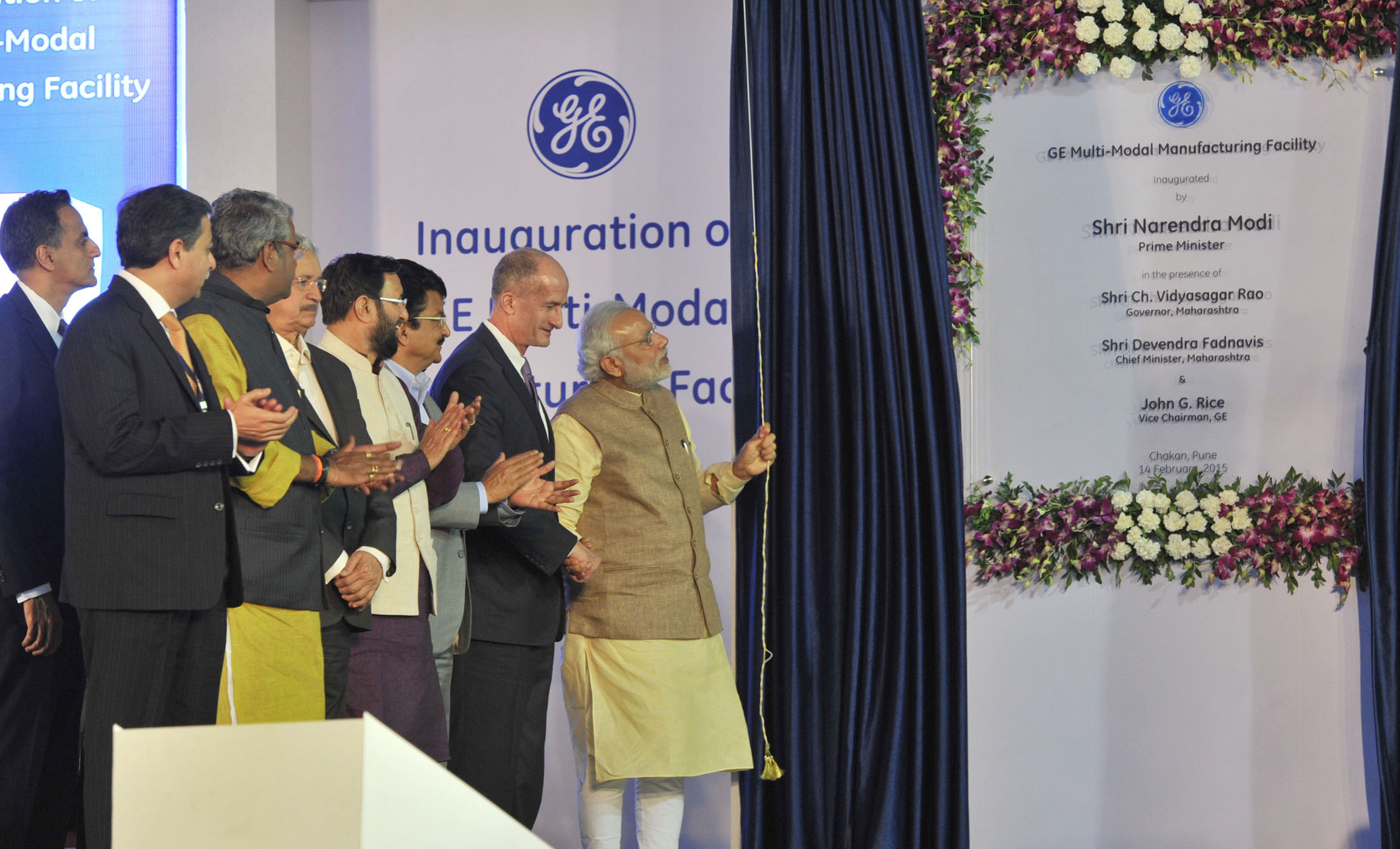
PM Narendra Modi inaugurates GE's multi-modal manufacturing facility at Chakan

Historically, Chakan has been a wholesale agricultural produce trading hub. Its agricultural market was a major onion trading center. Chakan is now home to a Special Economic Zone (SEZ) promoted by the Maharashtra Industrial Development Corporation (MIDC). Its well known the top "automobile and manufacturing hub of India". It has since evolved into a major automobile hub. It hosts automobile production plants for the Mercedes-Benz, Volkswagen Group, Daimler-Benz, Mahindra & Mahindra, Jaguar Land Rover and Bajaj Auto, General Electric, Hyundai. Over 750 large and small industries, including a number of automobile component manufacturers, are based in the area.

Shiroli Chandus village, located 6 km north of Chakan, had been identified as the probable site for the proposed Pune International Airport, but due to the protests by the villagers & uneven topography, the site has been shifted to Purandar.

== Administration ==
Chakan Municipal Council manages the city since 2016, established by Government of Maharashtra.

Pune Metropolitan Region Development Authority is the Planning and Development Authority for the Chakan Municipal Council.

== Demographics ==
As of 2001 India census, Chakan town had a population of 41,634. Males constituted 54% of the population and females 46%, due to higher migrant workers in the neighboring industries. Chakan had an average literacy rate of 72%, higher than the national average of 59.5%; with male literacy of 78% and female literacy of 65%. 15% of the population was under 6 years of age. Since then the town has seen multi-fold growth due to a number of new automobile industries that have been established in the area.

Some of the popular residential areas in Chakan include Talegaon Chowk, Main Road, Bramhin Lane, Bhujbal lane, Deshmukh Lane, Mal Ali, Bazar Peth, Nanekarwadi, Medankarwadi, Vadave Nagar, KadachiWadi, Shri Ram Nagar, Vishal Park, Varale, and Market Yard.

== Transport ==
Chakan is located 30 km from Pune City on the National Highway 50, between Pune and Nashik. Maharashtra State Road Transport Corporation runs frequent and extensive bus services that connect to various parts of Maharashtra state. PMPML buses connect Chakan to Pune and Pimpri-Chinchwad. PMPML Bus No. 357, Pune Station to Rajgurunagar, Bus No. 120, Pune MaNaPa to Chakan-Mahalunge run through Chakan connecting important areas of surrounding areas to Pune City. Highways connecting to Pune have heavy traffic due to extensive industrial growth in the area.

Chakan is also on the proposed Pune Junction - Nashik Road railway line. The nearest airport is the current Pune International Airport.

Phase III of the Pune Metro will connect Chakan to Moshi, which hosts an International Convention and Exhibition centre.

== Tourism ==
Chakan boasts the Sangram Durga or Bhueekot Killa, which has played a significant part in the history of the region for many centuries.The fort is built on level ground and surrounded by the fortified walls and turrets. It differs from most Indian forts which were traditionally built on hilly, elevated land.

The Chakreshwar temple is another site of importance. Legend has it that it is the site where King Dasharatha was battling a Rakshasa (Demon King), when the wheel of his ratha (chariot) was stuck in mud near the pond of Chakreshwar. When his wife Kaikeyi helped get the wheel unstuck, Dasharatha granted her two wishes, which eventually led to the exile of Rama and the subsequent events of the epic Ramayana.

In May, Chakan celebrates a major festival called Khandobacha Urus (Yatra)

== Notable people ==
- Firangoji Narsala, Maratha Warrior & Fortress Commander
- Suresh Gore, Politician & Social Worker

== See also ==
- Battle of chakan
- Shivaji
- Chakan Fort
- Make in Maharashtra
- Maharashtra Industrial Development Corporation
