= 2017 FIA World Rallycross Championship =

Auto racing championship

The 2017 FIA World Rallycross Championship presented by Monster Energy was the fourth season of the FIA World Rallycross Championship. The season consists of twelve rounds, started on 1 April with the Spanish round at the Circuit de Barcelona-Catalunya and concluded on 12 November at the Killarney Motor Racing Complex in Cape Town, South Africa.

Johan Kristoffersson was the season's Driver's Champion, claiming it at the Neste World RX of Latvia. The Teams' Championship was won by PSRX Volkswagen Sweden.

== Calendar ==
On 17 October 2016 the provisional 2017 calendar was released. It once again contained twelve rounds; however the Argentine event was discontinued in favour of a new event in South Africa. Half of the rounds were supported by the RX2 category—formerly known as RX Lites.

| Rnd. | Event | Dates | Venue | Class | Winner | Team | Report |
|---|---|---|---|---|---|---|---|
| 1 | (Spain) World RX of Barcelona | 1–2 April | Circuit de Barcelona-Catalunya, Montmeló | Supercar | (Sweden) Mattias Ekström | (Sweden) EKS RX | Report |
| 2 | World RX of Portugal | 22–23 April | Pista Automóvel de Montalegre, Montalegre | Supercar | (Sweden) Mattias Ekström | (Sweden) EKS RX | Report |
| 3 | (Germany) World RX of Hockenheim | 5–7 May | Hockenheimring, Hockenheim | Supercar | (Sweden) Mattias Ekström | (Sweden) EKS RX | Report |
| 4 | World RX of Belgium | 13–14 May | Circuit Jules Tacheny Mettet, Mettet | Supercar | (Sweden) Johan Kristoffersson | PSRX Volkswagen Sweden | Report |
| 4 | World RX of Belgium | 13–14 May | Circuit Jules Tacheny Mettet, Mettet | RX2 | (France) Cyril Raymond | (Sweden) Olsbergs MSE | Report |
| 5 | (United Kingdom) World RX of Great Britain | 27–28 May | Lydden Hill Race Circuit, Wootton | Supercar | (Norway) Petter Solberg | PSRX Volkswagen Sweden | Report |
| 5 | (United Kingdom) World RX of Great Britain | 27–28 May | Lydden Hill Race Circuit, Wootton | RX2 | (France) Cyril Raymond | (Sweden) Olsbergs MSE | Report |
| 6 | World RX of Norway | 10–11 June | Lånkebanen, Hell | Supercar | (Sweden) Johan Kristoffersson | PSRX Volkswagen Sweden | Report |
| 6 | World RX of Norway | 10–11 June | Lånkebanen, Hell | RX2 | (France) Cyril Raymond | (Sweden) Olsbergs MSE | Report |
| 7 | World RX of Sweden | 1–2 July | Höljesbanan, Höljes | Supercar | (Sweden) Johan Kristoffersson | PSRX Volkswagen Sweden | Report |
| 7 | World RX of Sweden | 1–2 July | Höljesbanan, Höljes | RX2 | (United Kingdom) Dan Rooke | (United Kingdom) Team Faren | Report |
| 8 | World RX of Canada | 5–6 August | Circuit Trois-Rivières, Trois-Rivières | Supercar | (Sweden) Johan Kristoffersson | PSRX Volkswagen Sweden | Report |
| 8 | World RX of Canada | 5–6 August | Circuit Trois-Rivières, Trois-Rivières | RX2 | (France) Cyril Raymond | (Sweden) Olsbergs MSE | Report |
| 9 | World RX of France | 2–3 September | Circuit de Lohéac, Lohéac | Supercar | (Sweden) Johan Kristoffersson | PSRX Volkswagen Sweden | Report |
| 9 | World RX of France | 2–3 September | Circuit de Lohéac, Lohéac | RX2 | (France) Cyril Raymond | (Sweden) Olsbergs MSE | Report |
| 10 | World RX of Latvia | 16–17 September | Biķernieku Kompleksā Sporta Bāze, Riga | Supercar | (Sweden) Johan Kristoffersson | PSRX Volkswagen Sweden | Report |
| 11 | World RX of Germany | 30 September–1 October | Estering, Buxtehude | Supercar | (Sweden) Mattias Ekström | (Sweden) EKS RX | Report |
| 12 | World RX of South Africa | 11–12 November | Killarney Motor Racing Complex, Cape Town | Supercar | (Sweden) Johan Kristoffersson | PSRX Volkswagen Sweden | Report |
| 12 | World RX of South Africa | 11–12 November | Killarney Motor Racing Complex, Cape Town | RX2 | (France) Cyril Raymond | (Sweden) Olsbergs MSE | Report |

== Entries ==
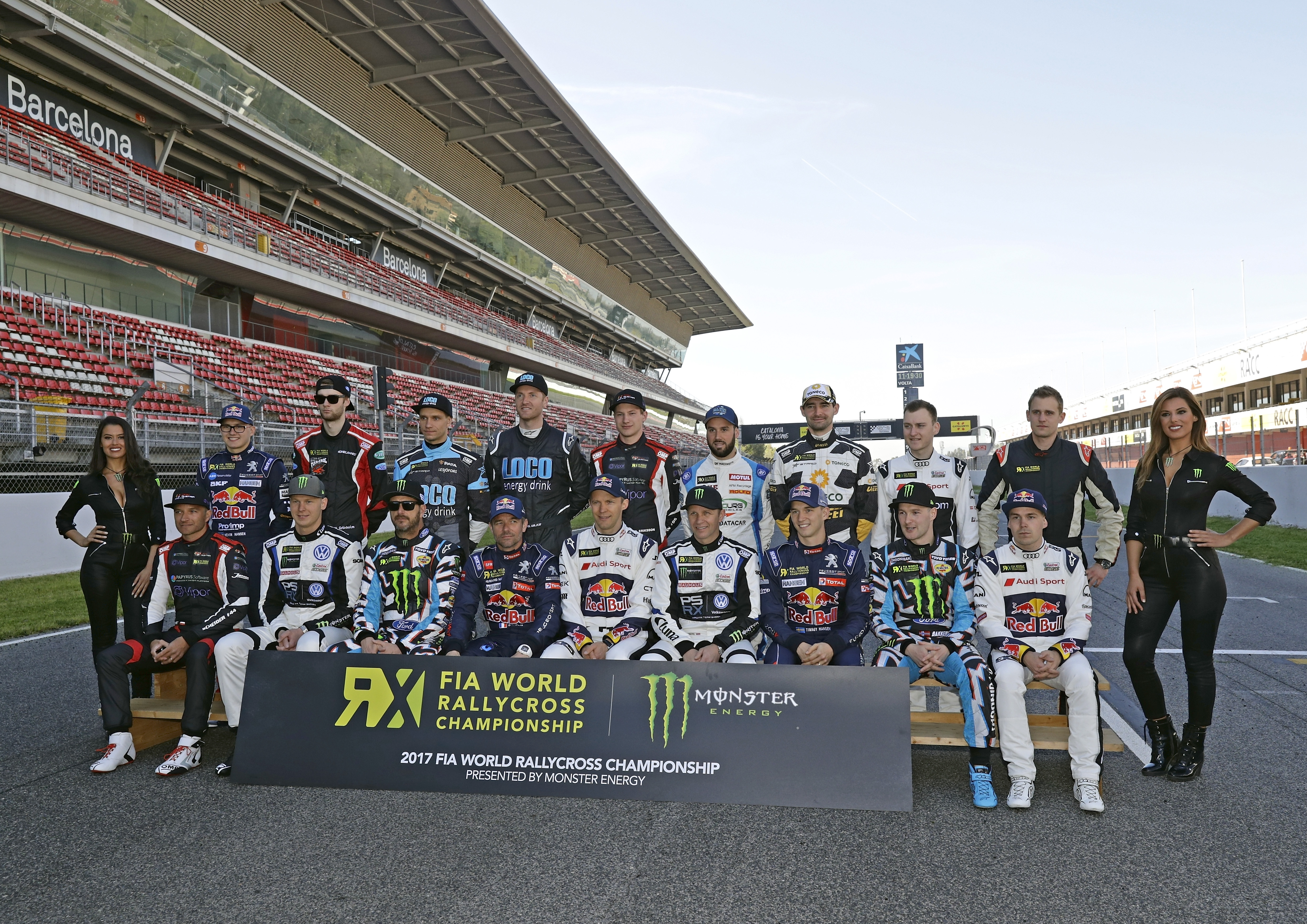
The permanent entrants of the 2017 Supercar season

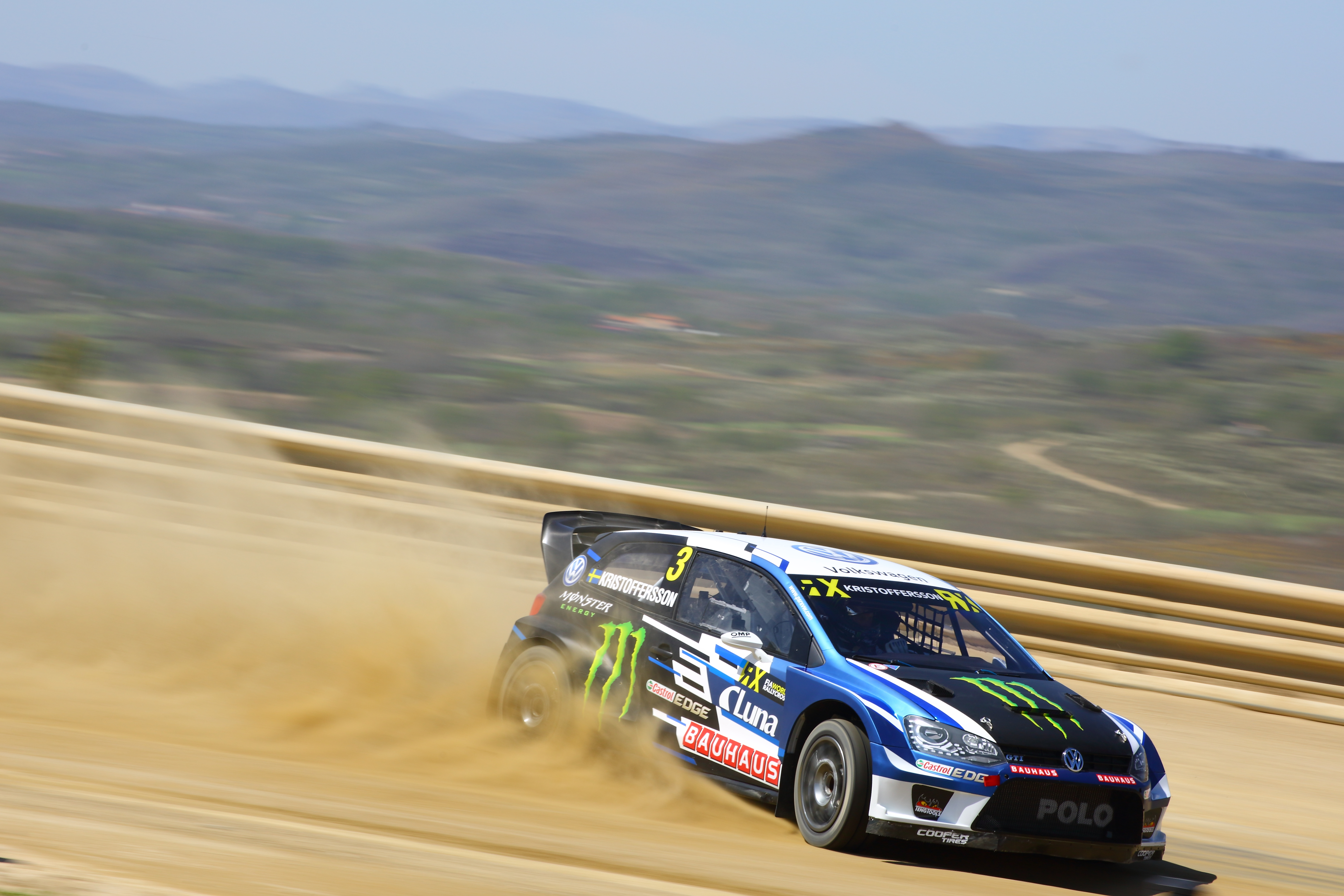
Petter Solberg moved across to PSRX Volkswagen Sweden, partnering with team owners Tommy and Johan Kristoffersson

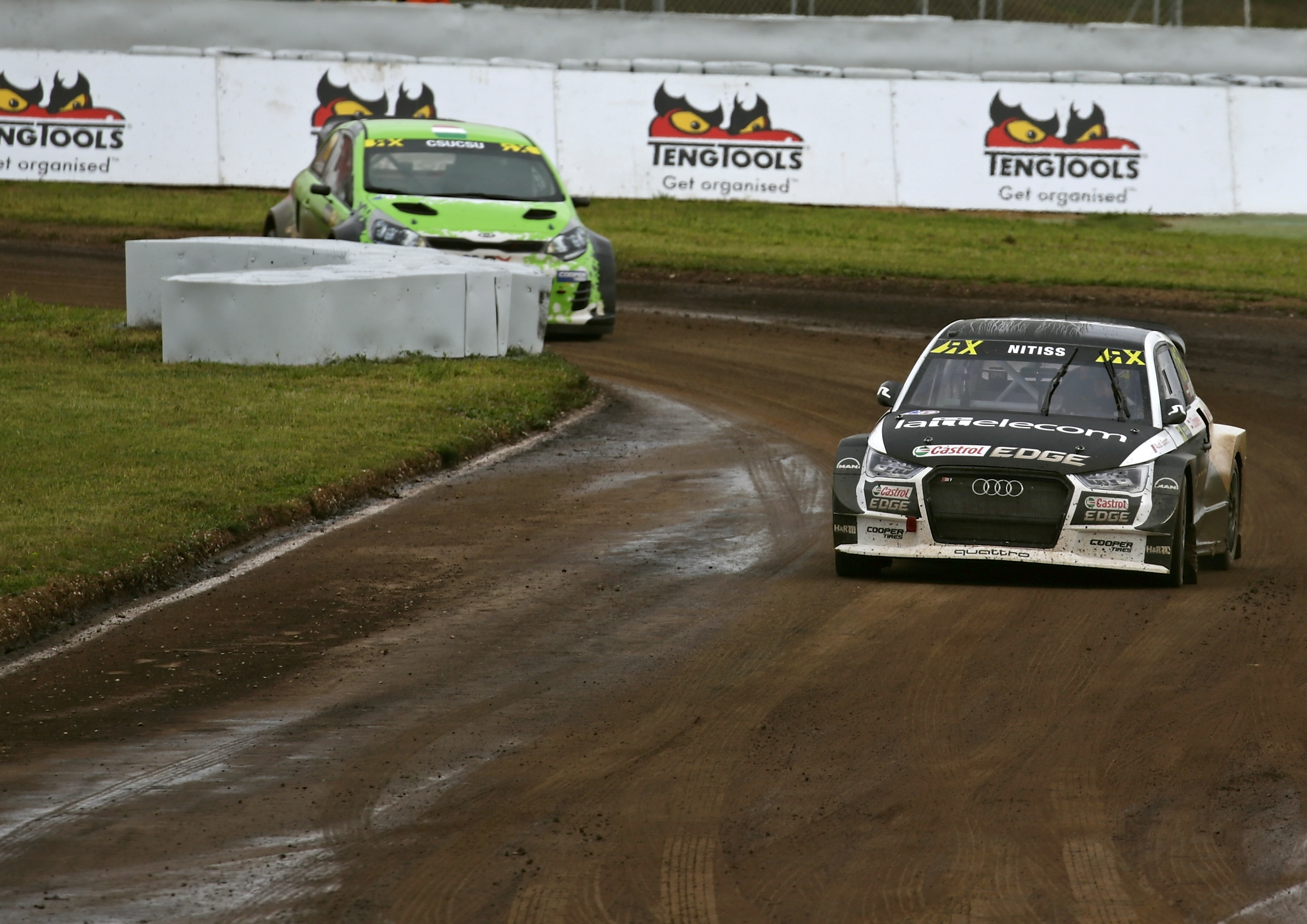
Reinis Nitišs (foreground) moved to EKS, while "Csucsu" made his WorldRX debut

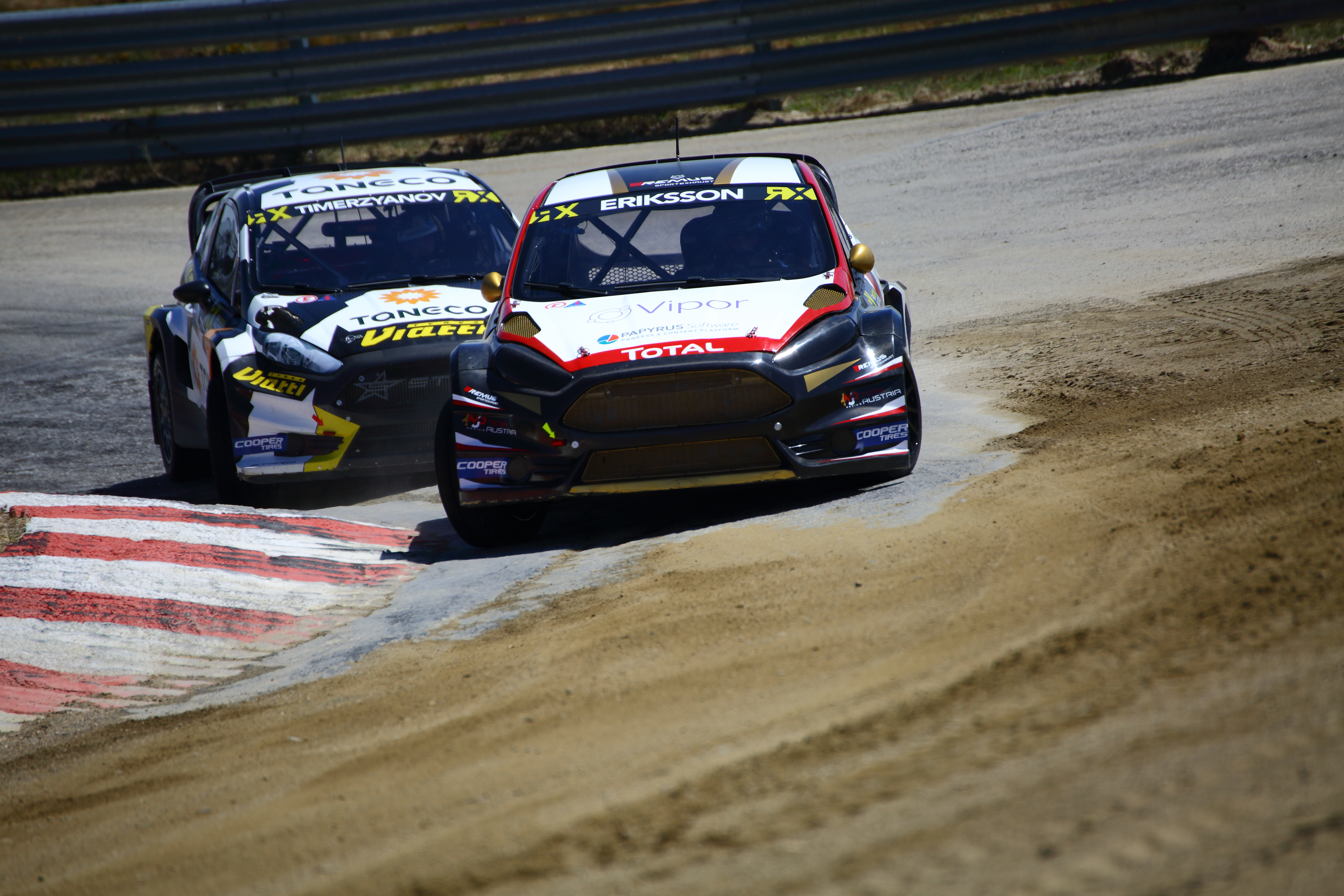
Manfred Stohl split with World RX Team Austria (foreground) and entered his own team, STARD (background)

=== Supercar ===
Permanent Entries
| Constructor | Entrant | Car | No. | Driver | Rounds |
|---|---|---|---|---|---|
| Audi | (Sweden) EKS RX | Audi S1 | 1 | (Sweden) Mattias Ekström | 1–6, 8–12 |
| Audi | (Sweden) EKS RX | Audi S1 | 15 | (Latvia) Reinis Nitišs | All |
| Audi | (Sweden) EKS RX | Audi S1 | 45 | (Sweden) Per-Gunnar Andersson | 7 |
| Audi | (Sweden) EKS RX | Audi S1 | 51 | (Switzerland) Nico Müller | 9–10 |
| Audi | (Sweden) EKS RX | Audi S1 | 57 | (Finland) Toomas Heikkinen | All |
| Ford | (United States) Hoonigan Racing Division | Ford Focus RS | 13 | (Norway) Andreas Bakkerud | All |
| Ford | (United States) Hoonigan Racing Division | Ford Focus RS | 43 | (United States) Ken Block | All |
| Ford | (Finland) GRX | Ford Fiesta | 68 | (Finland) Niclas Grönholm | All |
| Ford | MJP Racing Team Austria | Ford Fiesta | 44 | (Germany) Timo Scheider | 1–4, 6–12 |
| Ford | MJP Racing Team Austria | Ford Fiesta | 96 | (Sweden) Kevin Eriksson | All |
| Ford | (United Kingdom) MJP Pirtek Racing | Ford Fiesta | 177 | (United Kingdom) Andrew Jordan | 5 |
| Ford | (Austria) STARD | Ford Fiesta | 6 | (Latvia) Jānis Baumanis | All |
| Ford | (Austria) STARD | Ford Fiesta | 7 | (Russia) Timur Timerzyanov | All |
| Kia | (Hungary) Speedy Motorsport | Kia Rio | 10 | (Hungary) "Csucsu" | All |
| Peugeot | (France) DA Racing | Peugeot 208 | 15 | (France) Davy Jeanney | 11 |
| Peugeot | (France) DA Racing | Peugeot 208 | 66 | (France) Grégoire Demoustier | 1–2, 4–5, 8–9, 12 |
| Peugeot | (France) DA Racing | Peugeot 208 | 67 | (Belgium) François Duval | 10 |
| Peugeot | (France) DA Racing | Peugeot 208 | 87 | (France) Jean-Baptiste Dubourg | 1–9, 12 |
| Peugeot | (Sweden) Team Peugeot-Hansen | Peugeot 208 | 9 | (France) Sébastien Loeb | All |
| Peugeot | (Sweden) Team Peugeot-Hansen | Peugeot 208 | 21 | (Sweden) Timmy Hansen | All |
| Peugeot | (Sweden) Team Peugeot-Hansen | Peugeot 208 | 71 | (Sweden) Kevin Hansen | All |
| Volkswagen | (United Kingdom) LOCO World RX Team | Volkswagen Polo | 58 | (United Kingdom) Alister McRae | 9 |
| Volkswagen | (United Kingdom) LOCO World RX Team | Volkswagen Polo | 100 | (United Kingdom) Guy Wilks | 1–8 |
| Volkswagen | PSRX Volkswagen Sweden | Volkswagen Polo GTI | 3 | (Sweden) Johan Kristoffersson | All |
| Volkswagen | PSRX Volkswagen Sweden | Volkswagen Polo GTI | 11 | (Norway) Petter Solberg | All |
| Volkswagen | PSRX Volkswagen Sweden | Volkswagen Polo GTI | 94 | (Germany) Dieter Depping | 11 |
Non-permanent entries: Constructor / Entrant / Car / No. / Driver / Rounds; Audi / (Sweden) Robin Larsson / Audi A1 / 4 / (Sweden) Robin Larsson / 3; Audi / (Hungary) Kárai Motorsport Sportegyesület / Audi A1 / 102 / (Hungary) Tamás Kárai / 4; Citroën / (Germany) All-Inkl.com Münnich Motorsport / Citroën DS3 / 77 / (Germany) René Münnich / 5, 8; Citroën / (France) Hervé "Knapick" Lemonnier / Citroën DS3 / 84 / (France) "Knapick" / 1, 6–7, 9–10; Ford / (Republic of Ireland) Oliver O'Donovan / Ford Fiesta / 2 / (Republic of Ireland) Oliver O'Donovan / 5; Ford / (United Kingdom) Oliver Bennett / Ford Fiesta / 42 / (United Kingdom) Oliver Bennett / 5; Ford / (Belgium) M.D.K. / Ford Fiesta / 49 / (Belgium) "M.D.K." / 4–5; Ford / (Poland) Martin Kaczmarski / Ford Fiesta / 69 / (Poland) Martin Kaczmarski / 2–5, 11; Ford / (Germany) Andreas Steffen / Ford Fiesta / 80 / (Germany) Andreas Steffen / 11; Ford / (Sweden) Olsbergs MSE / Ford Fiesta / 59 / (South Africa) Ashley Haigh-Smith / 12; Ford / (Sweden) Olsbergs MSE / Ford Fiesta / 93 / (Sweden) Sebastian Eriksson / 7, 11; Ford / (Sweden) Olsbergs MSE / Ford Fiesta / 98 / (Sweden) Oliver Eriksson / 7, 12; Ford / (Portugal) Bompiso Racing Team / Ford Focus / 41 / (Portugal) Joaquim Santos / 2; Mitsubishi / (Finland) Vaaranmara Racing / Mitsubishi Mirage / 60 / (Finland) Joni-Pekka Rajala / 6–7, 10; Peugeot / (France) Emmanuel Anne / Peugeot 208 / 21 / (France) Emmanuel Anne / 9; Peugeot / (France) Gaëtan Sérazin / Peugeot 208 / 40 / (France) Gaëtan Sérazin / 9; Peugeot / (United Kingdom) Albatec Racing / Peugeot 208 / 67 / (Belgium) François Duval / 4; Peugeot / (United Kingdom) Albatec Racing / Peugeot 208 / 124 / (South Africa) Mark Cronje / 12; Peugeot / (France) Laurent Bouliou / Peugeot 208 / 78 / (France) Laurent Bouliou / 6, 9; Renault / (France) Guerlain Chicherit / Renault Clio / 36 / (France) Guerlain Chicherit / 1, 3–4, 6, 9; SEAT / (Germany) All-Inkl.com Münnich Motorsport / Seat Ibiza Cupra / 77 / (Germany) René Münnich / 2–3, 11–12

* Entries in grey denote one-car teams which are ineligible to score teams championship points.

=== RX2 International Series ===
- All of the RX2 cars are designed and produced by Avitas Motorsport in cooperation with Olsbergs MSE.

Permanent Entries
| Entrant | No. | Driver | Rounds |
|---|---|---|---|
| (Sweden) A. Berggrens Bilservice Floby | 58 | (Sweden) Santosh Berggren | 1,4 |
| (Sweden) Anders Michalak | 12 | (Sweden) Anders Michalak | All |
| (Norway) Bard Holmen | 56 | (Norway) Thomas Holmen | All |
| (Norway) Ben-Philip Gundersen | 2 | (Norway) Ben-Philip Gundersen | 4 |
| (Norway) BPG Motorsport | 43 | (Norway) Tony Sormbroen | 3 |
| (Norway) Glenn Haug | 9 | (Norway) Glenn Haug | All |
| (Belgium) Guillaume De Ridder | 96 | (Belgium) Guillaume De Ridder | All |
| (Sweden) Hampus Rådström | 17 | (Sweden) Hampus Rådström | 4 |
| (Sweden) Helmia Motorsport | 91 | (Sweden) Jonathan Walfridsson | 3–4 |
| (Sweden) JC Raceteknik | 6 | (Sweden) William Nilsson | 4–7 |
| (Sweden) JC Raceteknik | 21 | (Sweden) Marcus Höglund | 3–4 |
| (Sweden) JC Raceteknik | 66 | (Sweden) William Nilsson | 1–3 |
| (Sweden) JC Raceteknik | 69 | (Norway) Sondre Evjen | All |
| (Sweden) Linus Östlund | 18 | (Sweden) Linus Östlund | 4 |
| (Sweden) Olsbergs MSE | 11 | (United States) Tanner Whitten | All |
| (Sweden) Olsbergs MSE | 13 | (France) Cyril Raymond | All |
| (Sweden) Olsbergs MSE | 19 | (Sweden) Andreas Bäckman | All |
| (Sweden) Olsbergs MSE | 26 | (Sweden) Jessica Bäckman | All |
| (Sweden) Olsbergs MSE | 33 | (Kenya) Tejas Hirani | 1 |
| (Sweden) Olsbergs MSE | 36 | (France) Guerlain Chicherit | 5, 7 |
| (Sweden) Olsbergs MSE | 53 | (United States) Cole Keatts | 5 |
| (Sweden) Sandra Hultgren | 51 | (Sweden) Sandra Hultgren | 1–6 |
| (Finland) Set Promotion | 8 | (Norway) Simon Wågø Syversen | All |
| (Sweden) Simon Olofsson | 52 | (Sweden) Simon Olofsson | All |
| (Latvia) Sports Racing Technologies | 55 | (Latvia) Vasily Gryazin | All |
| (Norway) Stein Frederic Akre | 98 | (Norway) Stein Frederic Akre | 3–4, 7 |
| (United Kingdom) Team Färén | 40 | (United Kingdom) Dan Rooke | All |

== Championship Standings ==
=== FIA World Rallycross Championship for Drivers ===
(key)

| Pos. | Driver | BAR (Spain) | POR (Portugal) | HOC (Germany) | BEL (Belgium) | GBR (United Kingdom) | NOR (Norway) | SWE (Sweden) | CAN (Canada) | FRA (France) | LAT (Latvia) | GER (Germany) | RSA (South Africa) | Points |
|---|---|---|---|---|---|---|---|---|---|---|---|---|---|---|
| 1 | (Sweden) Johan Kristoffersson | 6 | 3 | 2 | 1 | 2 | 1 | 1 | 1 | 1 | 1 | 7 | 1 | 316 |
| 2 | (Sweden) Mattias Ekström | 1 | 1 | 1 | 4 | 5 | 4 | | 7 | 3 | 2 | 1 | 3 | 255 |
| 3 | (Norway) Petter Solberg | 4 | 6 | 4 | 3 | 1 | 7 | 7 | 2 | 5 | 7 | 4 | 4 | 252 |
| 4 | (France) Sébastien Loeb | 14 | 2 | 5 | 7 | 4 | 3 | 3 | 3 | 2 | 3 | 11 | 10 | 214 |
| 5 | (Sweden) Timmy Hansen | 5 | 4^{a} | 3 | 2 | 6 | 5 | 4 | 6 | 6 | 9^{h} | 2 | 2 | 201 |
| 6 | (Norway) Andreas Bakkerud | 3 | 10 | 14 | 6 | 3 | 2 | 2 | 13 | 4 | 4 | 8 | 7 | 194 |
| 7 | (Finland) Toomas Heikkinen | 8 | 12 | 6 | 9 | 12 | 11 | 14 | 5 | 11 | 8 | 3 | 11 | 125 |
| 8 | (Sweden) Kevin Hansen | 11 | 8 | 8 | 21 | 13 | 9 | 13 | 10 | 8 | 10 | 6 | 6 | 115 |
| 9 | (United States) Ken Block | 9 | 11 | 11 | 8 | 7 | 8 | 9 | 9 | 7^{f} | 14 | 14 | 8 | 112 |
| 10 | (Germany) Timo Scheider | 2 | 15 | 7 | 11 | | 12 | 10 | 12 | 9 | 15 | 15 | 5 | 109 |
| 11 | (Sweden) Kevin Eriksson | 13 | 14 | 10 | 5 | 9 | 13 | 5 | 4 | 16 | 18 | 10 | 12 | 101 |
| 12 | (Latvia) Jānis Baumanis | 15 | 7 | 15 | 16 | 10 | 14 | 6 | 8 | 10 | 5 | 9 | 9 | 98 |
| 13 | (Russia) Timur Timerzyanov | 20 | 9 | 9 | 10 | 11 | 6 | 11 | 11 | 15 | 13 | 17 | 13 | 78 |
| 14 | (Latvia) Reinis Nitišs | 10 | 5 | 12 | 13 | 16 | 10 | 18 | 16 | 12 | 11 | 12 | 18 | 71 |
| 15 | (United Kingdom) Guy Wilks | 7 | 16 | 19 | 14 | 14 | 17 | 20 | 15 | | | | | 21 |
| 16 | (France) Jean-Baptiste Dubourg | 12 | 17 | 17 | 18 | 18 | 15 | 16 | 17 | 13 | | | 14 | 17 |
| 17 | (Switzerland) Nico Müller | | | | | | | | | 17 | 6 | | | 13 |
| 18 | (Sweden) Sebastian Eriksson | | | | | | | 12 | | | | 13 | | 12 |
| 19 | (United Kingdom) Andrew Jordan | | | | | 8 | | | | | | | | 11 |
| 20 | (Finland) Niclas Grönholm | 17 | 13 | 16 | 12 | 15 | 16 | 8 | 14^{e} | 14 | 12^{i} | 5^{j} | 15^{k} | 4 |
| 21 | (Sweden) Robin Larsson | | | 13 | | | | | | | | | | 4 |
| 22 | (Belgium) François Duval | | | | 15 | | | | | | 20 | | | 2 |
| 23 | (Sweden) Per-Gunnar Andersson | | | | | | | 15 | | | | | | 2 |
| 24 | (Sweden) Oliver Eriksson | | | | | | | 17 | | | | | 16 | 1 |
| 25 | (France) "Knapick" | 18 | | | | | 21 | 21 | | 20 | 16 | | | 1 |
| 26 | (Germany) Dieter Depping | | | | | | | | | | | 16 | | 1 |
| 27 | (Germany) René Münnich | | 18 | 20 | | 17 | | | 18 | | | 19 | 17 | 0 |
| 28 | (Poland) Martin Kaczmarski | | 19 | 18 | 19 | 22 | | | | | | 22 | | 0 |
| 29 | (Belgium) M.D.K. | | | | 17 | 24 | | | | | | | | 0 |
| 30 | (France) Davy Jeanney | | | | | | | | | | | 18 | | 0 |
| 31 | (France) Gaëtan Sérazin | | | | | | | | | 18 | | | | 0 |
| 32 | (France) Guerlain Chicherit | 21 | | 21 | 20 | | 19 | | | 19 | | | | 0 |
| 33 | (France) Laurent Bouliou | | | | | | 20 | | | 21 | | | | 0 |
| 34 | (Republic of Ireland) Oliver O'Donovan | | | | | 20 | | | | | | | | 0 |
| 35 | (South Africa) Mark Cronje | | | | | | | | | | | | 20 | 0 |
| 36 | (Germany) Andreas Steffen | | | | | | | | | | | 21 | | 0 |
| 37 | (South Africa) Ashley Haigh-Smith | | | | | | | | | | | | 21 | 0 |
| 38 | (Portugal) Joaquim Santos | | 22 | | | | | | | | | | | 0 |
| 39 | (United Kingdom) Oliver Bennett | | | | | 23 | | | | | | | | 0 |
| 40 | (Hungary) Tamás Kárai | | | | 23 | | | | | | | | | 0 |
| 41 | (United Kingdom) Alister McRae | | | | | | | | | 24 | | | | 0 |
| 42 | (Hungary) "Csucsu" | 16 | 20 | 22 | 24^{c} | 21 | 22 | 22 | 19 | 22 | 17 | 20 | | -9 |
| 43 | (Finland) Joni-Pekka Rajala | | | | | | 18 | 19^{d} | | | 19 | | | -10 |
| 44 | (France) Grégoire Demoustier | 19 | 21^{b} | | 22 | 19 | | | 20 | 23 | | | 19 | -10 |
| 45 | (France) Emmanuel Anne | | | | | | | | | 25^{g} | | | | -10 |
| Pos. | Driver | BAR (Spain) | POR (Portugal) | HOC (Germany) | BEL (Belgium) | GBR (United Kingdom) | NOR (Norway) | SWE (Sweden) | CAN (Canada) | FRA (France) | LAT (Latvia) | GER (Germany) | RSA (South Africa) | Points |

^{a} Ten championship points deducted for use of an unregistered tyre in Q3.
^{b} Ten championship points deducted for sealing an additional turbo after scrutineering.
^{c} Ten championship points deducted for sealing an additional turbo after scrutineering.
^{d} Ten championship points deducted for use of a third turbocharger in the competition.
^{e} Fifteen championship points deducted for use of a fourth engine seal.
^{f} Five championship points deducted for receiving his third reprimand in the championship.
^{g} Ten championship points deducted for presenting a turbocharger for sealing after initial scrutineering.
^{h} Fifteen championship points deducted for use of a fourth engine in the championship.
^{i} Ten championship points deducted for use of a new turbo seal after initial scrutineering.
^{j} Fifteen championship points deducted for use of more than three engine seals in the season.
^{k} Ten championship points deducted for use of a seventh turbocharger in the season.

=== FIA World Rallycross Championship for Teams ===
| Pos. | Team | No. | Drivers | Points |
|---|---|---|---|---|
| 1 | PSRX Volkswagen Sweden | 3 | (Sweden) Johan Kristoffersson | 544 |
| 1 | PSRX Volkswagen Sweden | 11 | (Norway) Petter Solberg | 544 |
| 1 | PSRX Volkswagen Sweden | 94 | (Germany) Dieter Depping | 544 |
| 2 | (Sweden) Team Peugeot-Hansen | 9 | (France) Sébastien Loeb | 415 |
| 2 | (Sweden) Team Peugeot-Hansen | 21 | (Sweden) Timmy Hansen | 415 |
| 3 | (Sweden) EKS RX | 1 | (Sweden) Mattias Ekström | 380 |
| 3 | (Sweden) EKS RX | 15 | (Latvia) Reinis Nitišs | 380 |
| 3 | (Sweden) EKS RX | 57 | (Finland) Toomas Heikkinen | 380 |
| 4 | (United States) Hoonigan Racing Division | 13 | (Norway) Andreas Bakkerud | 306 |
| 4 | (United States) Hoonigan Racing Division | 43 | (United States) Ken Block | 306 |
| 5 | MJP Racing Team Austria | 44 | (Germany) Timo Scheider | 221 |
| 5 | MJP Racing Team Austria | 96 | (Sweden) Kevin Eriksson | 221 |
| 5 | MJP Racing Team Austria | 177 | (United Kingdom) Andrew Jordan | 221 |
| 6 | (Austria) STARD | 6 | (Latvia) Jānis Baumanis | 176 |
| 6 | (Austria) STARD | 7 | (Russia) Timur Timerzyanov | 176 |

=== RX2 International Series ===
(key)

| Pos. | Driver | BEL (Belgium) | GBR (United Kingdom) | NOR (Norway) | SWE (Sweden) | CAN (Canada) | FRA (France) | RSA (South Africa) | Points |
|---|---|---|---|---|---|---|---|---|---|
| 1 | (France) Cyril Raymond | 1 | 1 | 1 | 6 | 1 | 1 | 1 | 198 |
| 2 | (United Kingdom) Dan Rooke | 2 | 2 | 3 | 1 | 6 | 9 | 5 | 154 |
| 3 | (Belgium) Guillaume De Ridder | 9 | 4 | 8 | 2 | 2 | 2 | 6 | 138 |
| 4 | (United States) Tanner Whitten | 3 | 7 | 2 | 16 | 3 | 15 | 3 | 105 |
| 5 | (Sweden) William Nilsson | 10 | 5 | 7 | 3 | 8 | 7 | 10 | 98 |
| 6 | (Sweden) Simon Olofsson | 5 | 6 | 9 | 11 | 5 | 8 | 7 | 98 |
| 7 | (Latvia) Vasily Gryazin | 7 | 10 | 12 | 19 | 4 | 3 | 4 | 94 |
| 8 | (Norway) Sondre Evjen | 6 | 9 | 6 | 14 | 7 | 11 | 2 | 93 |
| 9 | (Norway) Glenn Haug | 4 | 8 | 4 | 12 | 13 | 10 | 15 | 76 |
| 10 | (Sweden) Andreas Bäckman | 15 | 14 | 5 | 4 | 9 | 12 | 8 | 69 |
| 11 | (Norway) Thomas Holmen | 11 | 3 | 18 | 8 | 14 | 6 | 9 | 67 |
| 12 | (Norway) Simon Wågø Syversen | 17 | 12 | 11 | 7 | 16 | 4 | 13 | 47 |
| 13 | (Sweden) Anders Michalak | 8 | 11 | 16 | 13 | 17 | 5 | 11 | 45 |
| 14 | (Norway) Stein Frederic Akre | | | 19 | 5 | | | 14 | 22 |
| 15 | (Sweden) Jessica Bäckman | 16 | 13 | 14 | 22 | 10 | 14 | 16 | 21 |
| 16 | (Sweden) Sandra Hultgren | 14 | 15 | 15 | 17 | 11 | 13 | | 19 |
| 17 | (Sweden) Marcus Höglund | | | 10 | 9 | | | | 18 |
| 18 | (Sweden) Linus Östlund | | | | 10 | | | | 10 |
| 19 | (Kenya) Tejas Hirani | 12 | | | | | | | 8 |
| 20 | (France) Guerlain Chicherit | | | | | 15 | | 12 | 8 |
| 21 | (United States) Cole Keatts | | | | | 12 | | | 7 |
| 22 | (Sweden) Santosh Berggren | 13 | | | 21 | | | | 4 |
| 23 | (Norway) Tony Sormbroen | | | 13 | | | | | 4 |
| 24 | (Norway) Ben-Philip Gundersen | | | | 15 | | | | 2 |
| 25 | (Sweden) Jonathan Walfridsson | | | 17 | 18 | | | | 0 |
| 26 | (Sweden) Hampus Rådström | | | | 20 | | | | 0 |
