= 2015 World RX of France =

Rallycross event

- Round 9 of 13 in the 2015 FIA World Rallycross Championship
- Date: 5-6 September 2015
- Location: Lohéac, Bretagne
- Venue: Circuit de Lohéac

Results
Heat winners
- Heat 1: (Sweden) Timmy Hansen; Team Peugeot-Hansen
- Heat 2: (Sweden) Timmy Hansen; Team Peugeot-Hansen
- Heat 3: (Norway) Petter Solberg; SDRX
- Heat 4: Johan Kristoffersson; Volkswagen Team Sweden
Semi-final winners
- Semi-final 1: (Sweden) Timmy Hansen; Team Peugeot-Hansen
- Semi-final 2: (Norway) Petter Solberg; SDRX
Final
- First: (Sweden) Timmy Hansen; Team Peugeot-Hansen
- Second: (Norway) Petter Solberg; SDRX
- Third: (France) Jean-Baptiste Dubourg; Jean-Baptiste Dubourg

World RX layout of Circuit de Lohéac

The 2015 World RX of France was the ninth round of the second season of the FIA World Rallycross Championship. The event was held at the Circuit de Lohéac in Lohéac, Bretagne during 5–6 September 2015.

== Heats ==
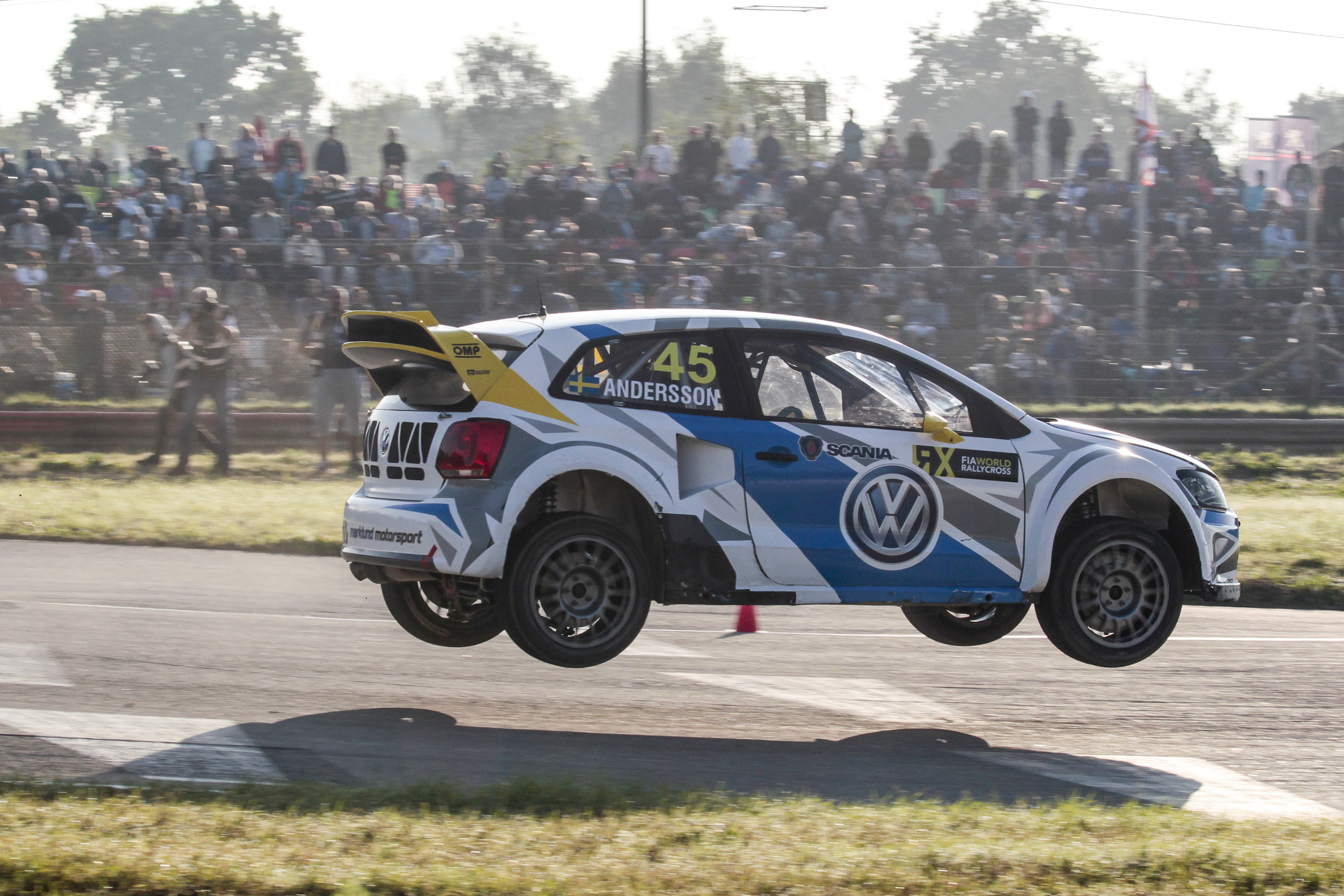
Per-Gunnar Andersson

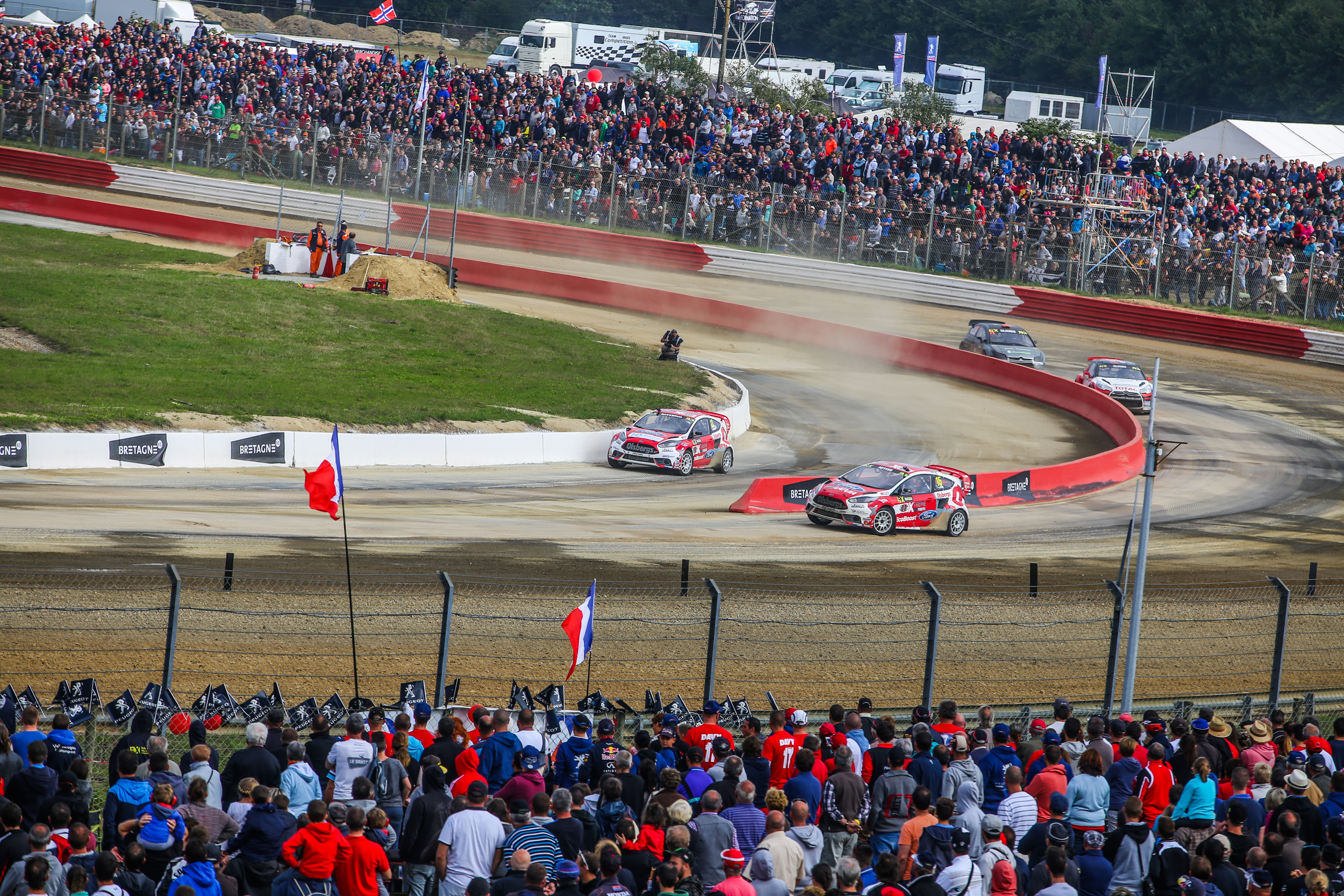
Andreas Bakkerud, Reinis Nitišs, "Knapick" and Marc Laboulle

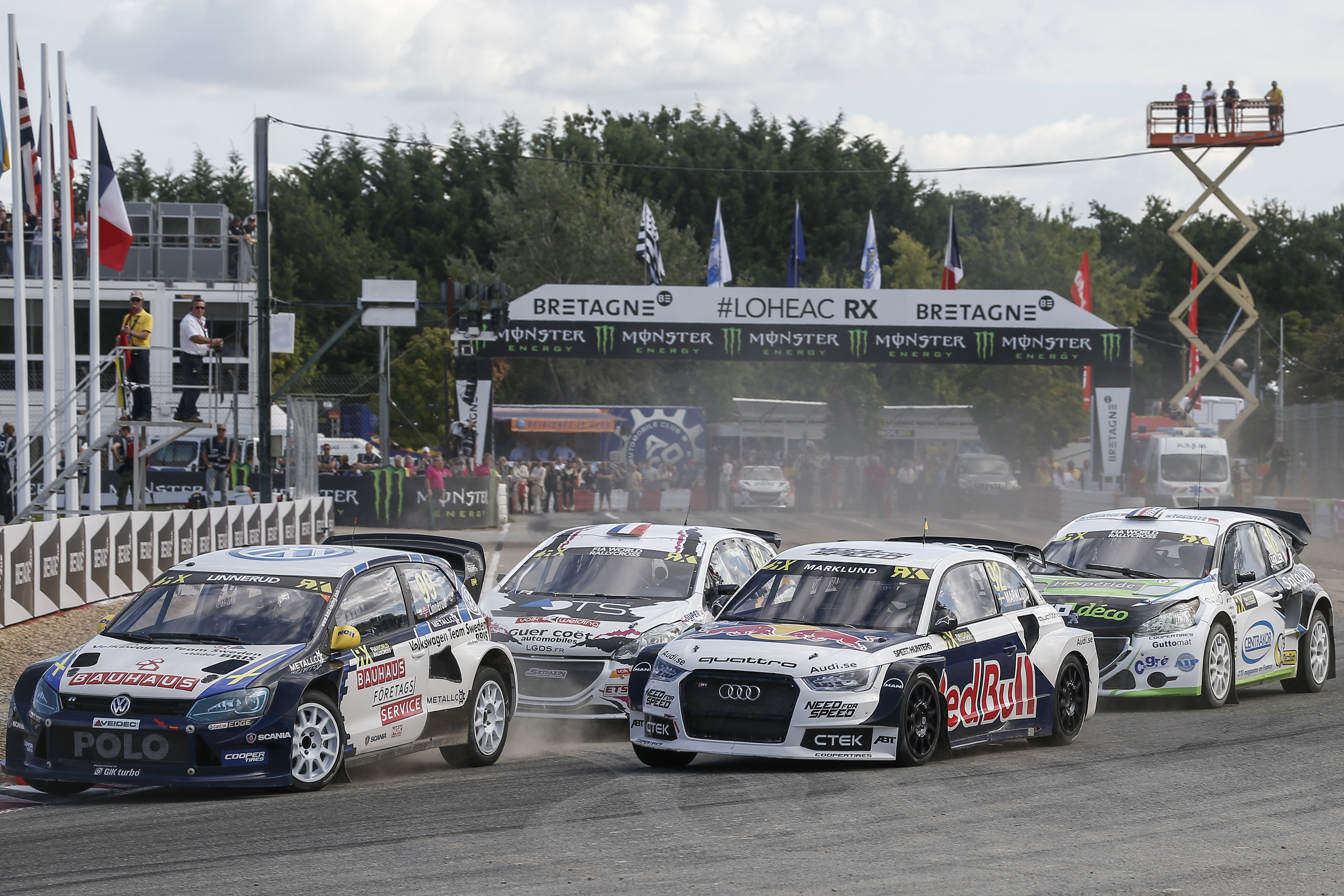
Tord Linnerud, Anton Marklund, Gaëtan Sérazin and Jonathan Pailler

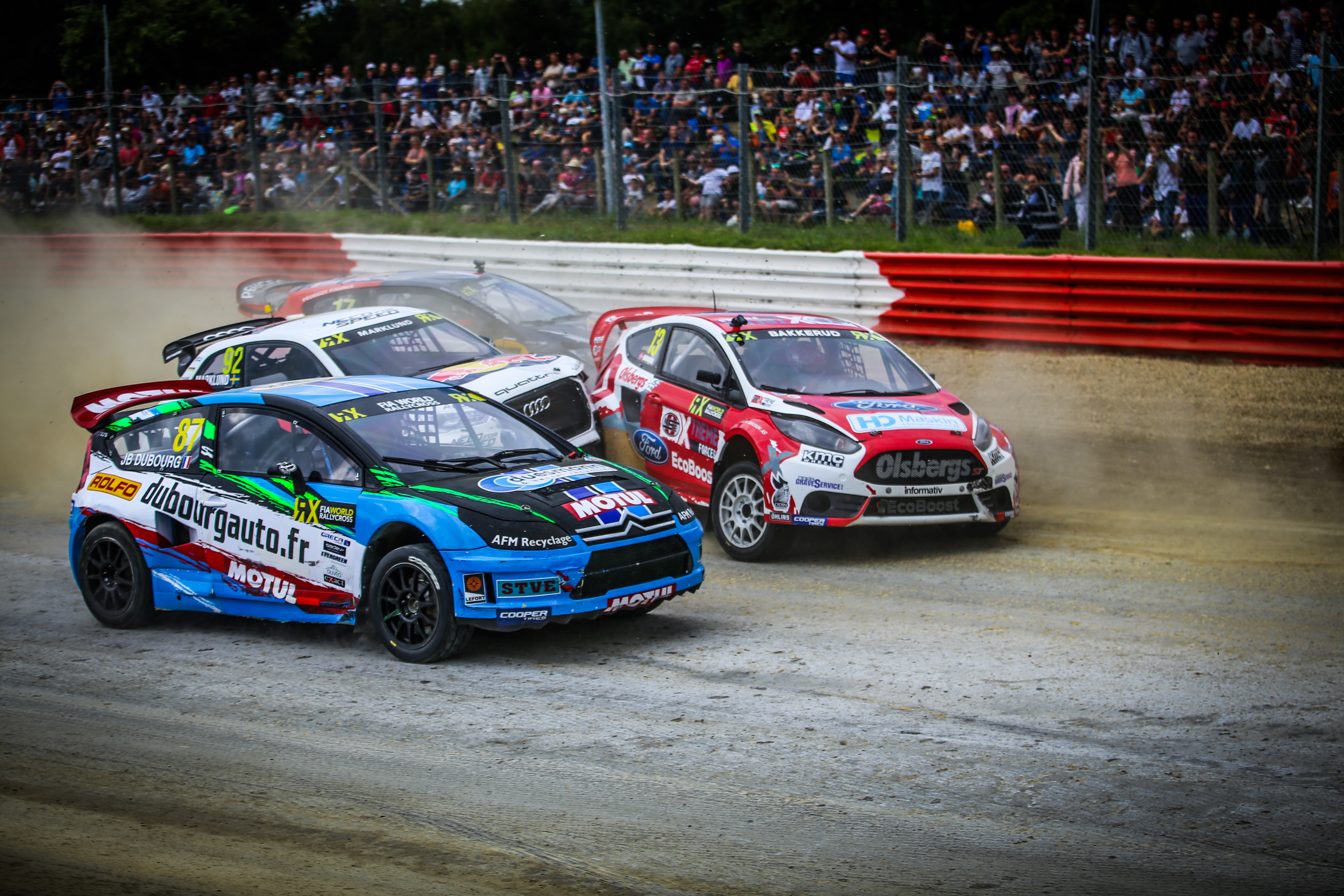
Dubourg, Bakkerud, Marklund and Jeanney battle during Semi-Final 1

World Championship classification
| Pos. | No. | Driver | Team | Car | H1 | H2 | H3 | H4 | Pts |
|---|---|---|---|---|---|---|---|---|---|
| 1 | 21 | (Sweden) Timmy Hansen | Team Peugeot-Hansen | Peugeot 208 | 1st | 1st | 2nd | 6th | 16 |
| 2 | 1 | (Norway) Petter Solberg | SDRX | Citroën DS3 | 2nd | 2nd | 1st | 5th | 15 |
| 3 | 10 | (Sweden) Mattias Ekström | EKS RX | Audi S1 | 4th | 3rd | 5th | 4th | 14 |
| 4 | 3 | (Sweden) Johan Kristoffersson | Volkswagen Team Sweden | Volkswagen Polo | 3rd | 7th | 15th | 1st | 13 |
| 5 | 87 | (France) Jean-Baptiste Dubourg | Jean-Baptiste Dubourg | Citroën C4 | 17th | 5th | 4th | 11th | 12 |
| 6 | 57 | (Finland) Toomas Heikkinen | Marklund Motorsport | Volkswagen Polo | 10th | 20th | 3rd | 7th | 11 |
| 7 | 13 | (Norway) Andreas Bakkerud | Olsbergs MSE | Ford Fiesta ST | 7th | 10th | 21st | 9th | 10 |
| 8 | 4 | (Sweden) Robin Larsson | Larsson Jernberg Racing Team | Audi A1 | 18th | 16th | 6th | 8th | 9 |
| 9 | 92 | (Sweden) Anton Marklund | EKS RX | Audi S1 | 13th | 11th | 7th | 18th | 8 |
| 10 | 42 | (Russia) Timur Timerzyanov | Namus OMSE | Ford Fiesta ST | DNF | 4th | 12th | 2nd | 7 |
| 11 | 17 | (France) Davy Jeanney | Team Peugeot-Hansen | Peugeot 208 | 9th | 8th | 8th | 26th | 6 |
| 12 | 62 | (France) Gaëtan Sérazin | Gaëtan Sérazin | Peugeot 208 | 12th | 13th | 14th | 14th | 5 |
| 13 | 45 | (Sweden) Per-Gunnar Andersson | Marklund Motorsport | Volkswagen Polo | 23rd | 9th | 9th | 15th | 4 |
| 14 | 74 | (France) Jérôme Grosset-Janin | Albatec Racing | Peugeot 208 | 5th | 31st | 13th | 10th | 3 |
| 15 | 55 | (Sweden) Alx Danielsson | All-Inkl.com Münnich Motorsport | Audi S3 | 15th | 22nd | 11th | 12th | 2 |
| 16 | 15 | (Latvia) Reinis Nitišs | Olsbergs MSE | Ford Fiesta ST | 16th | 12th | 22nd | 16th | 1 |
| 17 | 33 | (United Kingdom) Liam Doran | SDRX | Citroën DS3 | 26th | 6th | 33rd | 3rd | |
| 18 | 99 | (Norway) Tord Linnerud | Volkswagen Team Sweden | Volkswagen Polo | 11th | 18th | 27th | 13th | |
| 19 | 168 | (France) Yvan Muller | Albatec Racing | Peugeot 208 | 8th | 32nd | 10th | 19th | |
| 20 | 18 | (France) Jonathan Pailler | Pailler Compétition | Peugeot 208 | 14th | 23rd | 19th | 27th | |
| 21 | 7 | (Austria) Manfred Stohl | World RX Team Austria | Ford Fiesta | 6th | 14th | 28th | DNF | |
| 22 | 84 | (France) "Knapick" | Hervé "Knapick" Lemonnier | Citroën DS3 | 27th | 17th | 23rd | 22nd | |
| 23 | 31 | (Austria) Max Pucher | World RX Team Austria | Ford Fiesta | 22nd | 26th | 18th | 23rd | |
| 24 | 71 | (France) Marc Laboulle | Marc Laboulle | Citroën C4 | 21st | 25th | 24th | 20th | |
| 25 | 102 | (Hungary) Tamás Kárai | Racing-Com | Škoda Fabia | 20th | 27th | 25th | 21st | |
| 26 | 89 | (France) Fabien Chanoine | Fabien Chanoine | Renault Clio | 24th | 24th | 31st | 17th | |
| 27 | 20 | (France) Fabien Pailler | Pailler Compétition | Peugeot 208 | 31st | 21st | 16th | 29th | |
| 28 | 65 | (France) Guerlain Chicherit | JRM Racing | BMW MINI Countryman | 25th | 15th | 20th | EX | |
| 29 | 85 | (France) David Olivier | David Olivier | Renault Logan | 28th | 28th | 26th | 24th | |
| 30 | 78 | (France) Laurent Bouliou | Laurent Bouliou | Peugeot 207 | 29th | 30th | 30th | 25th | |
| 31 | 67 | (Belgium) François Duval | Ecurie Bayard ASBL | Ford Fiesta | DNS | 19th | 29th | 28th | |
| 32 | 64 | (Lebanon) Nabil Karam | Nabil Karam | Citroën DS3 | 30th | 29th | 32nd | DNS | |
| 33 | 37 | (United Kingdom) Guy Wilks | JRM Racing | BMW MINI Countryman | DNS | DNS | 17th | DNF | |
| 34 | 77 | (Germany) René Münnich | All-Inkl.com Münnich Motorsport | Audi S3 | 19th | DNF | DNS | DNS | |
| 35 | 56 | (France) Gilles Franco | Gilles Franco | Peugeot 208 | DNF | DNS | DNS | DNS | |

== Semi-finals ==
=== Semi-final 1 ===
| Pos. | No. | Driver | Team | Time | Pts. |
|---|---|---|---|---|---|
| 1 | 21 | (Sweden) Timmy Hansen | Team Peugeot-Hansen | 3:49.039 | 6 |
| 2 | 10 | (Sweden) Mattias Ekström | EKS RX | +0.281 | 5 |
| 3 | 87 | (France) Jean-Baptiste Dubourg | Jean-Baptiste Dubourg | +2.851 | 4 |
| 4 | 92 | (Sweden) Anton Marklund | EKS RX | +10.000 | 3 |
| 5 | 13 | (Norway) Andreas Bakkerud | Olsbergs MSE | +14.327 | 2 |
| 6 | 17 | (France) Davy Jeanney | Team Peugeot-Hansen | DNF | 1 |

=== Semi-final 2 ===
| Pos. | No. | Driver | Team | Time | Pts. |
|---|---|---|---|---|---|
| 1 | 1 | (Norway) Petter Solberg | SDRX | 3:50.318 | 6 |
| 2 | 3 | (Sweden) Johan Kristoffersson | Volkswagen Team Sweden | +2.251 | 5 |
| 3 | 4 | (Sweden) Robin Larsson | Larsson Jernberg Racing Team | +2.653 | 4 |
| 4 | 57 | (Finland) Toomas Heikkinen | Marklund Motorsport | +4.065 | 3 |
| 5 | 62 | (France) Gaëtan Sérazin | Gaëtan Sérazin | +7.153 | 2 |
| 6 | 42 | (Russia) Timur Timerzyanov | Namus OMSE | +10.182 | 1 |

== Final ==
| Pos. | No. | Driver | Team | Time | Pts. |
|---|---|---|---|---|---|
| 1 | 21 | (Sweden) Timmy Hansen | Team Peugeot-Hansen | 3:48.500 | 8 |
| 2 | 1 | (Norway) Petter Solberg | SDRX | +3.001 | 5 |
| 3 | 87 | (France) Jean-Baptiste Dubourg | Jean-Baptiste Dubourg | +3.570 | 4 |
| 4 | 3 | (Sweden) Johan Kristoffersson | Volkswagen Team Sweden | +4.731 | 3 |
| 5 | 10 | (Sweden) Mattias Ekström | EKS RX | +30.307 | 2 |
| 6 | 4 | (Sweden) Robin Larsson | Larsson Jernberg Racing Team | DNF | 1 |

== Championship standings after the event ==
| Pos. | Driver | Points |
|---|---|---|
| 1 | (Norway) Petter Solberg | 219 |
| 2 | (Sweden) Timmy Hansen | 182 |
| 3 | (Sweden) Johan Kristoffersson | 156 |
| 4 | (Norway) Andreas Bakkerud | 152 |
| 5 | (France) Davy Jeanney | 146 |

| Previous race: 2015 World RX of Norway | FIA World Rallycross Championship; 2015 season | Next race: 2015 World RX of Barcelona |
| Previous race: 2014 World RX of France | World RX of France | Next race: 2016 World RX of France |
