= 2017 World RX of France =

Rallycross event

- Round 9 of 12 in the 2017 FIA World Rallycross Championship
- Date: 2–3 September 2017
- Location: Lohéac, Bretagne
- Venue: Circuit de Lohéac

Results
Heat winners
- Heat 1: Johan Kristoffersson; PSRX Volkswagen Sweden
- Heat 2: (France) Sébastien Loeb; Team Peugeot-Hansen
- Heat 3: (Sweden) Mattias Ekström; EKS RX
- Heat 4: Johan Kristoffersson; PSRX Volkswagen Sweden
Semi-final winners
- Semi-final 1: Johan Kristoffersson; PSRX Volkswagen Sweden
- Semi-final 2: (Sweden) Timmy Hansen; Team Peugeot-Hansen
Final
- First: Johan Kristoffersson; PSRX Volkswagen Sweden
- Second: (Norway) Andreas Bakkerud; Hoonigan Racing Division
- Third: (France) Sébastien Loeb; Team Peugeot-Hansen

World RX layout of Circuit de Lohéac

The 2017 World RX of France was the ninth round of the fourth season of the FIA World Rallycross Championship. The event was held at the Circuit de Lohéac in the Lohéac commune of Bretagne.

== Supercar ==
=== Heats ===
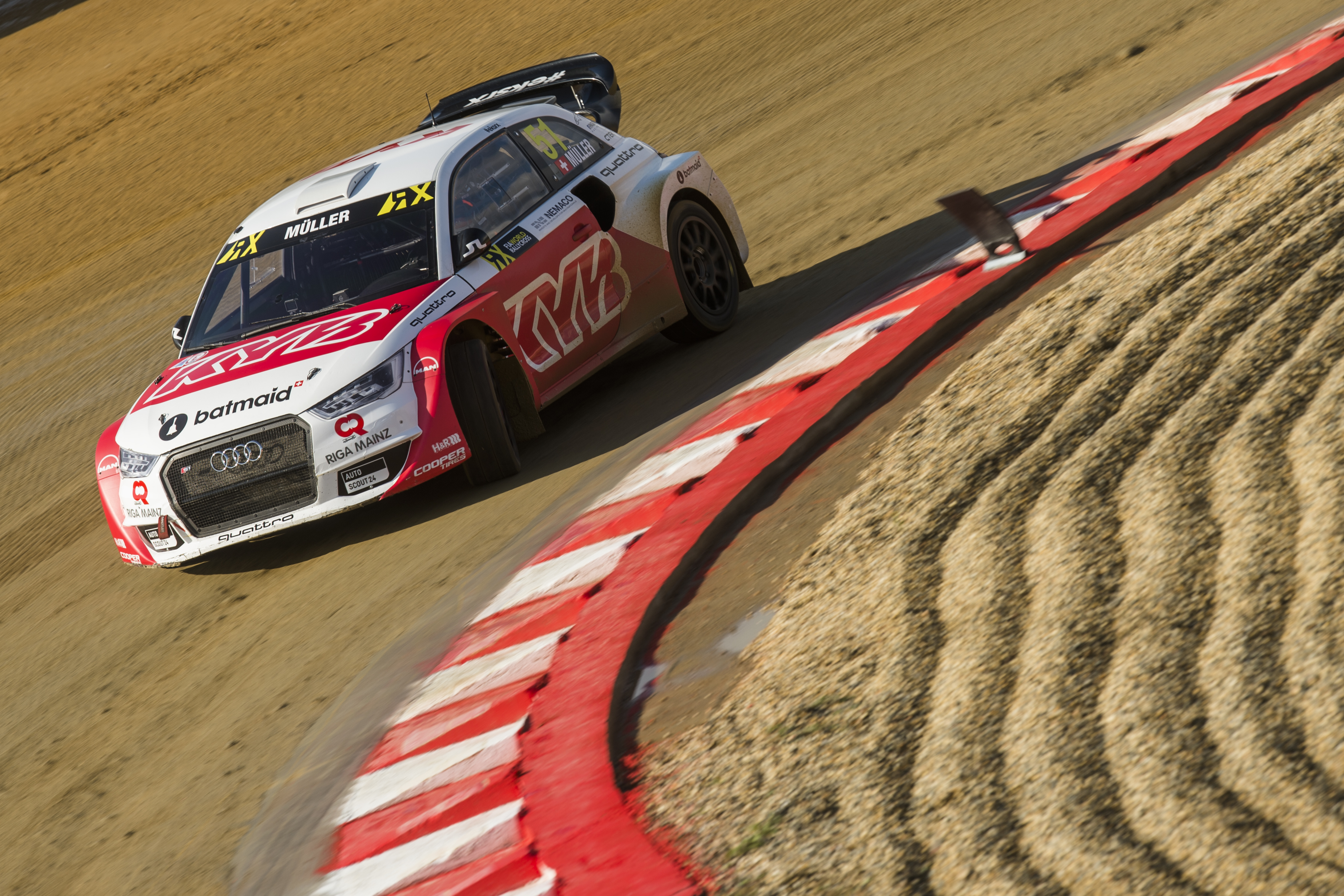
Nico Müller became the first Swiss to race in World RX

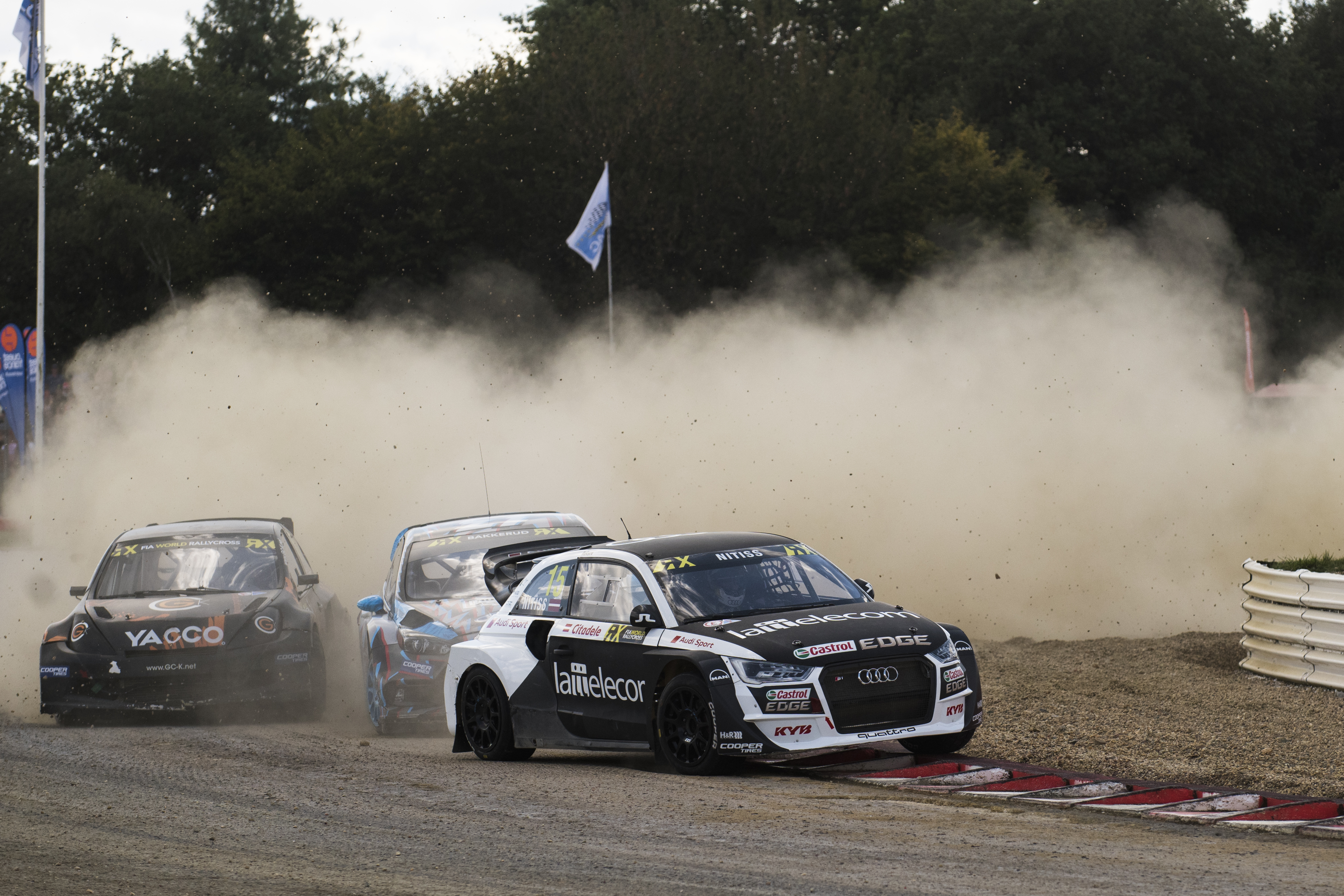
Reinis Nitišs leads Andreas Bakkerud and Guerlain Chicherit

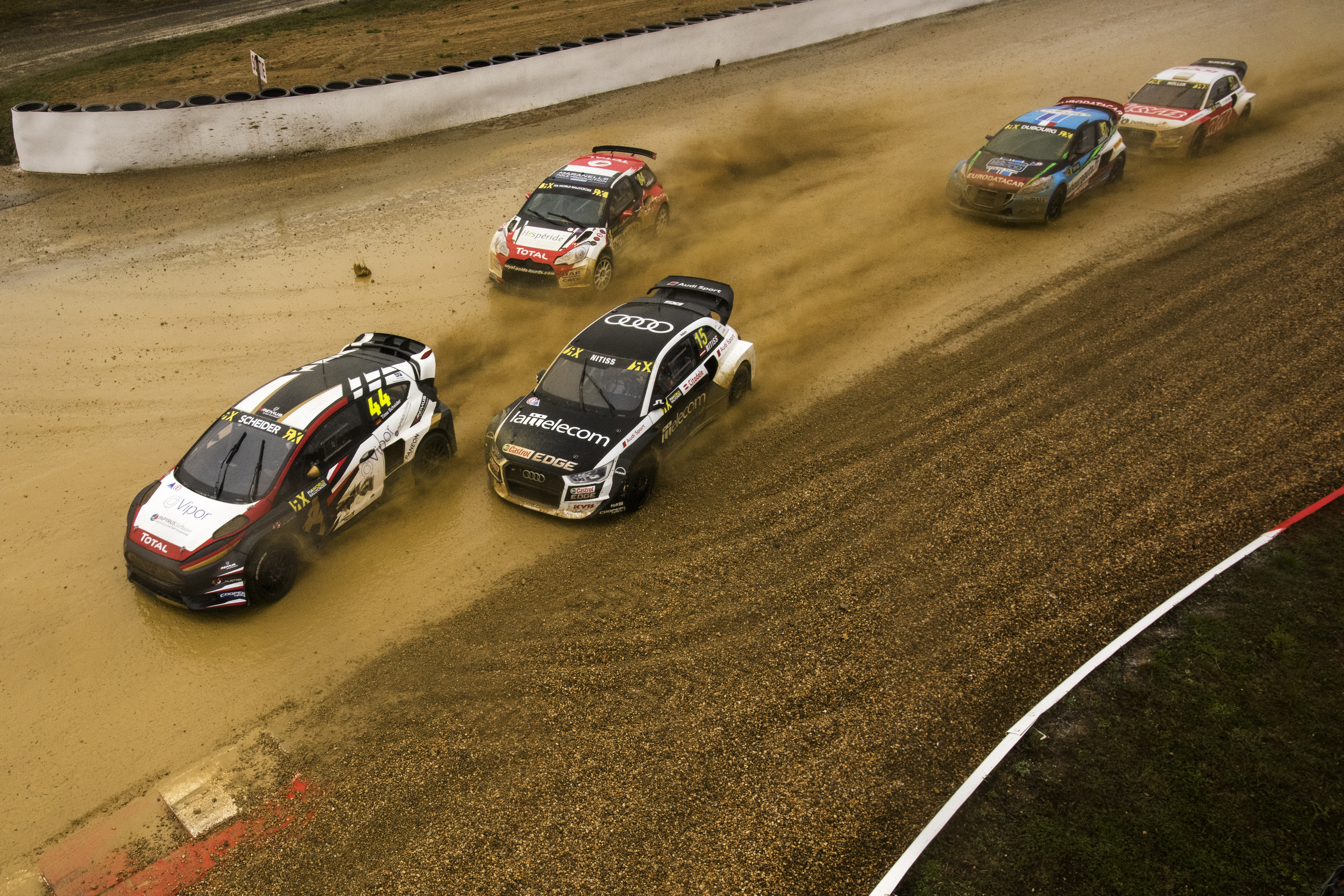
Timo Scheider is challenged by Nitišs and "Knapick", with JB Dubourg and Müller behind

| Pos. | No. | Driver | Team | Car | Q1 | Q2 | Q3 | Q4 | Pts |
|---|---|---|---|---|---|---|---|---|---|
| 1 | 3 | (Sweden) Johan Kristoffersson | PSRX Volkswagen Sweden | Volkswagen Polo GTI | 1st | 2nd | 3rd | 1st | 16 |
| 2 | 9 | (France) Sébastien Loeb | Team Peugeot-Hansen | Peugeot 208 | 2nd | 1st | 4th | 2nd | 15 |
| 3 | 1 | (Sweden) Mattias Ekström | EKS RX | Audi S1 | 3rd | 6th | 1st | 5th | 14 |
| 4 | 21 | (Sweden) Timmy Hansen | Team Peugeot-Hansen | Peugeot 208 | 5th | 10th | 2nd | 3rd | 13 |
| 5 | 11 | (Norway) Petter Solberg | PSRX Volkswagen Sweden | Volkswagen Polo GTI | 4th | 8th | 8th | 4th | 12 |
| 6 | 13 | (Norway) Andreas Bakkerud | Hoonigan Racing Division | Ford Focus RS | 7th | 4th | 9th | 8th | 11 |
| 7 | 43 | (United States) Ken Block | Hoonigan Racing Division | Ford Focus RS | 6th | 3rd | 5th | 15th | 10 |
| 8 | 71 | (Sweden) Kevin Hansen | Team Peugeot-Hansen | Peugeot 208 | 13th | 7th | 6th | 7th | 9 |
| 9 | 44 | (Germany) Timo Scheider | MJP Racing Team Austria | Ford Fiesta | 9th | 15th | 11th | 6th | 8 |
| 10 | 6 | (Latvia) Janis Baumanis | STARD | Ford Fiesta | 17th | 5th | 7th | 12th | 7 |
| 11 | 57 | (Finland) Toomas Heikkinen | EKS RX | Audi S1 | 12th | 11th | 10th | 10th | 6 |
| 12 | 15 | (Latvia) Reinis Nitišs | EKS RX | Audi S1 | 8th | 14th | 13th | 9th | 5 |
| 13 | 87 | (France) Jean-Baptiste Dubourg | DA Racing | Peugeot 208 | 14th | 17th | 14th | 11th | 4 |
| 14 | 68 | (Finland) Niclas Grönholm | GRX | Ford Fiesta | 11th | 16th | 16th | 13th | 3 |
| 15 | 7 | (Russia) Timur Timerzyanov | STARD | Ford Fiesta | 15th | 13th | 22nd | 13th | 2 |
| 16 | 96 | (Sweden) Kevin Eriksson | MJP Racing Team Austria | Ford Fiesta | 10th | 12th | DNF | 16th | 1 |
| 17 | 51 | (Switzerland) Nico Müller | EKS RX | Audi S1 | 24th | 9th | 15th | 17th | |
| 18 | 40 | (France) Gaëtan Sérazin | Gaëtan Sérazin | Peugeot 208 | 16th | 18th | 18th | 21st | |
| 19 | 36 | (France) Guerlain Chicherit | Guerlain Chicherit | Renault Clio | 19th | 19th | 19th | 22nd | |
| 20 | 84 | (France) "Knapick" | Hervé "Knapick" Lemonnier | Citroën DS3 | 21st | 21st | 12th | DNF | |
| 21 | 78 | (France) Laurent Bouliou | Laurent Bouliou | Peugeot 208 | 20th | 23rd | 24th | 18th | |
| 22 | 10 | (Hungary) "Csucsu" | Speedy Motorsport | Kia Rio | 22nd | 25th | 20th | 20th | |
| 23 | 66 | (France) Grégoire Demoustier | DA Racing | Peugeot 208 | 23rd | 24th | 23rd | 19th | |
| 24 | 58 | (United Kingdom) Alister McRae | LOCO World RX Team | Volkswagen Polo | 18th | 20th | 21st | DNS | |
| 25 | 21 | (France) Emmanuel Anne | Emmanuel Anne | Peugeot 208 | DNS | 22nd | 17th | 23rd | |

=== Semi-finals ===
Semi-final 1

| Pos. | No. | Driver | Team | Time | Pts |
|---|---|---|---|---|---|
| 1 | 3 | (Sweden) Johan Kristoffersson | PSRX Volkswagen Sweden | 04:08.345 | 6 |
| 2 | 11 | (Norway) Petter Solberg | PSRX Volkswagen Sweden | +0.541 | 5 |
| 3 | 1 | (Sweden) Mattias Ekström | EKS RX | +3.386 | 4 |
| 4 | 44 | (Germany) Timo Scheider | MJP Racing Team Austria | +5.573 | 3 |
| 5 | 57 | (Finland) Toomas Heikkinen | EKS RX | +12.987 | 2 |
| 6 | 43 | (United States) Ken Block | Hoonigan Racing Division | +24.866 | 1 |

Semi-final 2

| Pos. | No. | Driver | Team | Time | Pts |
|---|---|---|---|---|---|
| 1 | 21 | (Sweden) Timmy Hansen | Team Peugeot-Hansen | 04:12.656 | 6 |
| 2 | 9 | (France) Sébastien Loeb | Team Peugeot-Hansen | +0.335 | 5 |
| 3 | 13 | (Norway) Andreas Bakkerud | Hoonigan Racing Division | +1.778 | 4 |
| 4 | 6 | (Latvia) Jānis Baumanis | STARD | +6.466 | 3 |
| 5 | 71 | (Sweden) Kevin Hansen | Team Peugeot-Hansen | +37.008 | 2 |
| 6 | 15 | (Latvia) Reinis Nitišs | EKS RX | +39.535 | 1 |

=== Final ===
| Pos. | No. | Driver | Team | Time | Pts |
|---|---|---|---|---|---|
| 1 | 3 | (Sweden) Johan Kristoffersson | PSRX Volkswagen Sweden | 04:08.408 | 8 |
| 2 | 9 | (France) Sébastien Loeb | Team Peugeot-Hansen | +3.581 | 5 |
| 3 | 1 | (Sweden) Mattias Ekström | EKS RX | +4.586 | 4 |
| 4 | 13 | (Norway) Andreas Bakkerud | Hoonigan Racing Division | +7.386 | 3 |
| 5 | 11 | (Norway) Petter Solberg | PSRX Volkswagen Sweden | +38.690 | 2 |
| 6 | 21 | (Sweden) Timmy Hansen | Team Peugeot-Hansen | DNF | 1 |

== Standings after the event ==
| Pos. | Driver | Pts | Gap |
|---|---|---|---|
| 1 | (Sweden) Johan Kristoffersson | 241 | |
| 2 | (Norway) Petter Solberg | 195 | +46 |
| 3 | (Sweden) Mattias Ekström | 180 | +61 |
| 4 | (France) Sébastien Loeb | 169 | +72 |
| 5 | (Sweden) Timmy Hansen | 155 | +86 |

- Note: Only the top five positions are included.

| Previous race: 2017 World RX of Canada | FIA World Rallycross Championship; 2017 season | Next race: 2017 World RX of Latvia |
| Previous race: 2016 World RX of France | World RX of France | Next race: 2018 World RX of France |
