= Hommell =

French automobile manufacturer

- Industry: Automotive
- Founded: Lohéac, Ille-et-Vilaine, France (1990)
- Founder: Michel Hommell
- Defunct: 2003
- Fate: Financial reasons
- Headquarters: Lohéac, Ille-et-Vilaine, France
- Key people: Gilles Dupré
- Products: Hommell Berlinette Échappement; Hommell Barquette; Hommell Berlinette RS Coupe; Hommell Berlinette RS2
- Website: Passion Hommell

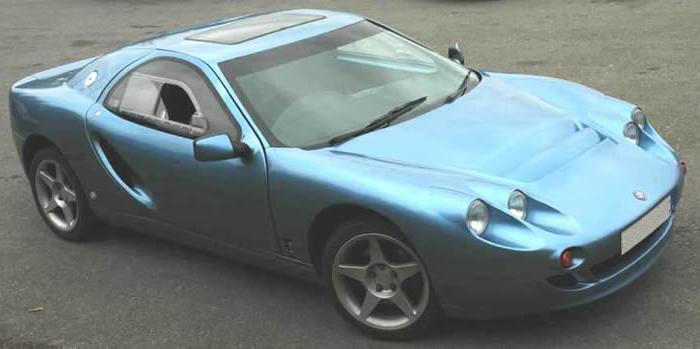
La Berlinette

Hommell was a French automobile manufacturer. Founded in 1990 by Michel Hommell, a former racing driver and the owner of Échappement, the company was based in Lohéac, near Rennes, Brittany.

The first prototype was shown at the 1990 Paris Salon, where it was well received and encouraged Hommell to go ahead with a production version. This was shown at the 1994 Geneva Motor Show. The 2 seat sports coupe is powered by a mid-mounted 2.0lt Peugeot engine and 6 speed gearbox in a tubular steel chassis with all-round independent suspension.

In 1998, the Barquette, an open-top version, and the Berlinette RS, featuring a powerful Citroën fitted engine, were announced.

== Models ==
Hommell has produced the following models under the direction of Gilles Dupré:

- Berlinette Échappement (1994)
  - Engine: 1998 cc in-line 4-cylinder DOHC 16-valve
  - Power: 155 bhp (116 kW; 157 PS) @ 6500 rpm
  - Torque: 137 lb⋅ft (186 N⋅m) @ 3500 rpm
  - Weight: 980 kg (2,161 lb)
  - Top Speed: 138 mph (222 km/h)
- Barquette (1994)
  - Engine: 1998 cc in-line 4-cylinder DOHC 16-valve
  - Power: 155 bhp (116 kW; 157 PS) @ 6500 rpm
  - Torque: 145 lb⋅ft (197 N⋅m) @ 5500 rpm
  - Weight: 940 kg (2,072 lb)
  - Top Speed: 130 mph (210 km/h)
- Berlinette RS coupé (1999)
  - Engine: 1998 cc in-line 4-cylinder DOHC 16-valve
  - Power: 167 bhp (125 kW; 169 PS) @ 6500 rpm
  - Torque: 147 lb⋅ft (199 N⋅m) @ 5500 rpm
  - Weight: 950 kg (2,094 lb)
  - Top Speed: 143 mph (230 km/h)
- Berlinette RS2 (2001)
  - Engine: 1998 cc in-line 4-cylinder DOHC 16-valve
  - Power: 195 bhp (145 kW; 198 PS) @ 6750 rpm
  - Torque: 159 lb⋅ft (216 N⋅m) @ 5500 rpm
  - Weight: 950 kg (2,094 lb)
  - Top Speed: 143 mph (230 km/h)
