= World RX of France =

Rallycross event held in France

The World RX of France was a Rallycross event held in France for the FIA World Rallycross Championship. The event made its debut in the 2014 season, at the Circuit de Lohéac in the town of Lohéac, Bretagne.

In 2019, the event change his name into Bretagne World RX of France.

In 2021, the event change his name again, becoming Bretagne World RX of Lohéac.

World RX layout of Circuit de Lohéac

== Past winners ==
Year	Heat 1 winner	Heat 2 winner	Heat 3 winner	Heat 4 winner	Semi-Final 1 winner	Semi-Final 2 winner	Final winner
2014	(Sweden) Timmy Hansen	(Sweden) Timmy Hansen	(Sweden) Timmy Hansen	(Norway) Andreas Bakkerud	(Sweden) Pontus Tidemand	(Norway) Petter Solberg	(Norway) Petter Solberg
2015	(Sweden) Timmy Hansen	(Sweden) Timmy Hansen	(Norway) Petter Solberg	(Sweden) Johan Kristoffersson	(Sweden) Timmy Hansen	(Norway) Petter Solberg	(Sweden) Timmy Hansen
Year	Qualifying 1 winner	Qualifying 2 winner	Qualifying 3 winner	Qualifying 4 winner	Semi-Final 1 winner	Semi-Final 2 winner	Final winner
2016	(Sweden) Mattias Ekström	(Sweden) Mattias Ekström	(Sweden) Johan Kristoffersson	(Sweden) Johan Kristoffersson	(Norway) Andreas Bakkerud	(Sweden) Johan Kristoffersson	(Sweden) Johan Kristoffersson
2017	(Sweden) Johan Kristoffersson	(France) Sébastien Loeb	(Sweden) Mattias Ekström	(Sweden) Johan Kristoffersson	(Sweden) Johan Kristoffersson	(Sweden) Timmy Hansen	(Sweden) Johan Kristoffersson
2018	(Sweden) Johan Kristoffersson	(Sweden) Mattias Ekström	(Sweden) Johan Kristoffersson	(Sweden) Johan Kristoffersson	(Sweden) Mattias Ekström	(Norway) Andreas Bakkerud	(Sweden) Johan Kristoffersson
2019	(Finland) Toomas Heikkinen	(Lithuania) Rokas Baciuska	(Norway) Andreas Bakkerud	(Sweden) Timmy Hansen	(Norway) Andreas Bakkerud	(Finland) Niclas Grönholm	(Sweden) Timmy Hansen
2020	Cancelled due to the COVID-19 pandemic						
2021	(Finland) Niclas Grönholm	(Sweden) Johan Kristoffersson	(Sweden) Johan Kristoffersson	(Sweden) Timmy Hansen	(Sweden) Timmy Hansen	(Sweden) Kevin Hansen	(Sweden) Timmy Hansen
