= Circuit de Lohéac =

Racing circuit in Ille-et-Vilaine, France

- Rallycross Circuit (1976–present)
- Location: Lohéac, France
- Coordinates: 47°51′51″N 1°53′37″W
- Capacity: 80,000
- Opened: 5 September 1976; 50 years ago
- Major events: Current: FIA European Rallycross Championship; Euro RX of France (1978, 1983, 1988, 1993, 2001, 2013–2019, 2021, 2026); Former: FIA World Rallycross Championship; World RX of France (2014–2019, 2021)

Rallycross Circuit (1976–present)
- Length: 1.070 km (0.665 mi)
- Turns: 7
- Race lap record: 0:35.843 ( (Sweden) Timmy Hansen, Peugeot 208 WRX, 2019)

The Circuit de Lohéac is a racing circuit in Lohéac, Ille-et-Vilaine, France. Opened in 1976, it is the oldest rallycross circuit in the country. It has hosted a round of the French Rallycross Championship annually from 1977 to 2012, and later since 2022. The circuit also hosted the French round of the FIA World Rallycross Championship from the inauguration of the championship in 2014 to 2019, and again with an appearance in 2021.

== History ==
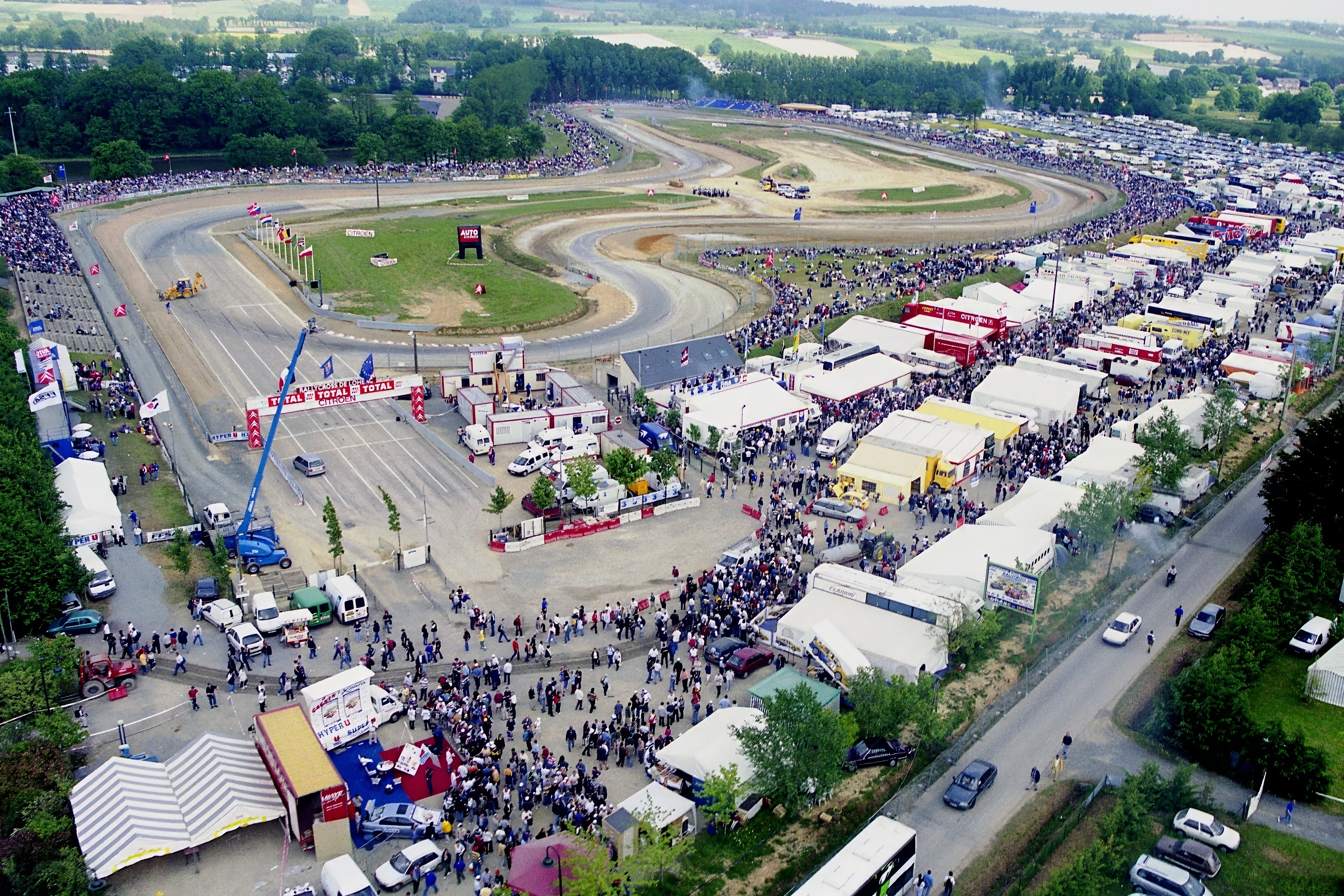
Circuit de Lohéac in 2001

This circuit was created by Michel Hommell, leader and founder of the Michel Hommell Group specializing in automotive magazines and between 1990 and 2003, would act as a car manufacturer. It is on this circuit that the inaugural French Rallycross Championship was raced, with the race taking place on September 5, 1976.

With over 80,000 spectators attending the 2018 edition, the French round of World Rallycross became the third most viewed auto racing event in France, after 24 Hours of Le Mans and French Grand Prix.

== See also ==
- Rallycross
- FIA World Rallycross Championship
- FIA European Rallycross Championship
- Hommell
- Lohéac
