= Lohéac =

Lohéac Lozeiac (Gallo) Lohieg (Breton)
- Commune
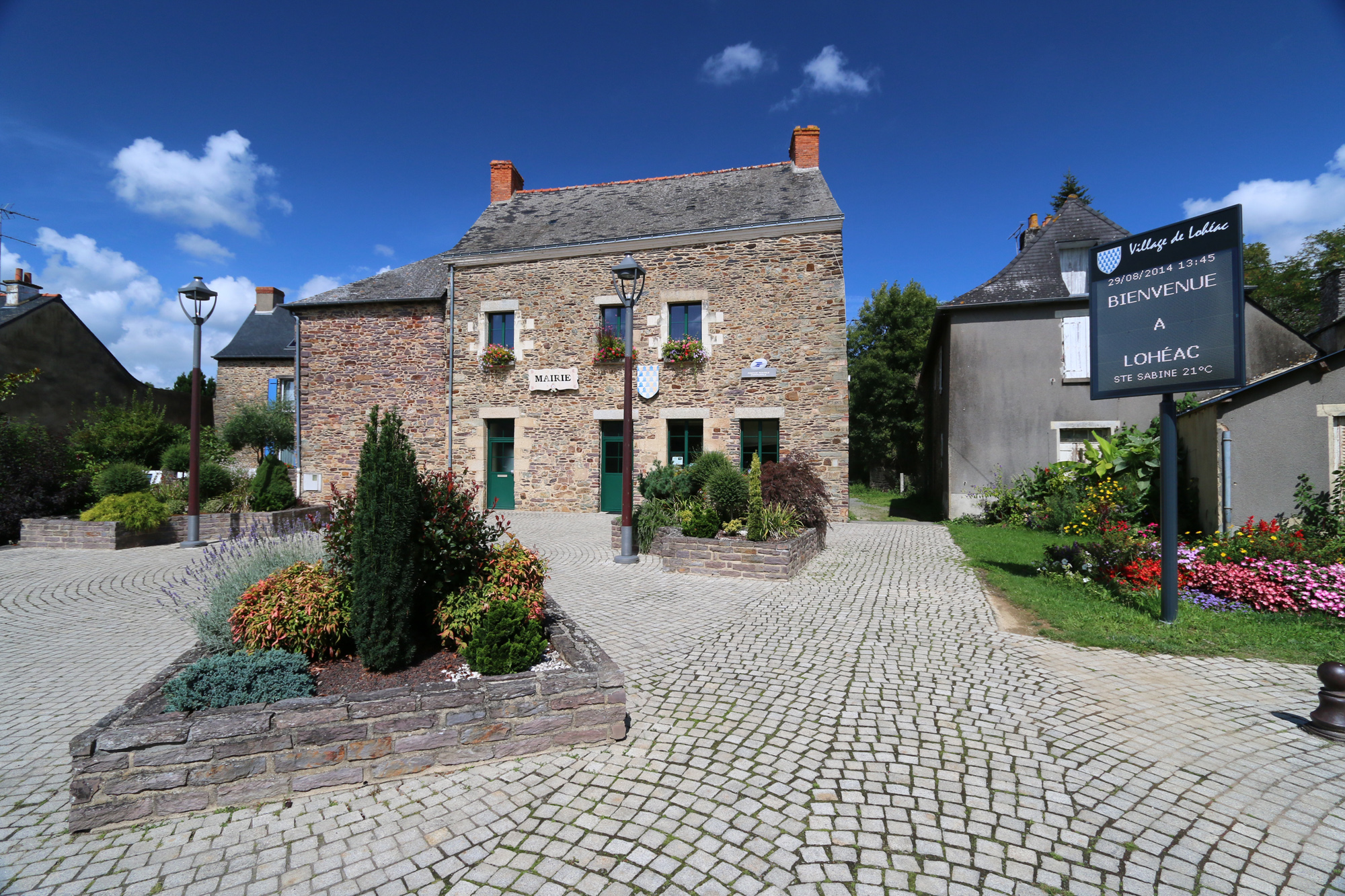
- The town hall of Lohéac

- Coat of arms
- Location of Lohéac
- Location within France Location within Brittany
- Coordinates: 47°51′59″N 1°52′55″W
- Country: France
- Region: Brittany
- Department: Ille-et-Vilaine
- Arrondissement: Redon
- Canton: Redon
- Intercommunality: Vallons de Haute-Bretagne

Government
  - Mayor (2020–2026): Patrick Bertin
- Area^{1}: 5.11 km^{2} (1.97 sq mi)
- Highest elevation: 100 m (330 ft)
- Lowest elevation: 34 m (112 ft)
- Population (2023): 702
  - Density: 137/km^{2} (356/sq mi)
- Time zone: UTC+01:00 (CET)
  - Summer (DST): UTC+02:00 (CEST)
- INSEE/Postal code: 35155 /35550
- ^{1} French Land Register data, which excludes lakes, ponds, glaciers > 1 km^{2} (0.386 sq mi or 247 acres) and river estuaries.

Lohéac (French pronunciation: [lɔeak]; Breton: Lohieg; Gallo: Lozeiac) is a commune in the Ille-et-Vilaine department in Brittany in northwestern France. The town is well known for cars and motorsport, hosting a rallycross track part of the FIA World Rallycross Championship, a tarmac racing circuit, a karting circuit, a quad bike circuit and the Manor of the Automobile, which hosts the Museum of the Automobile.

== Gallery ==
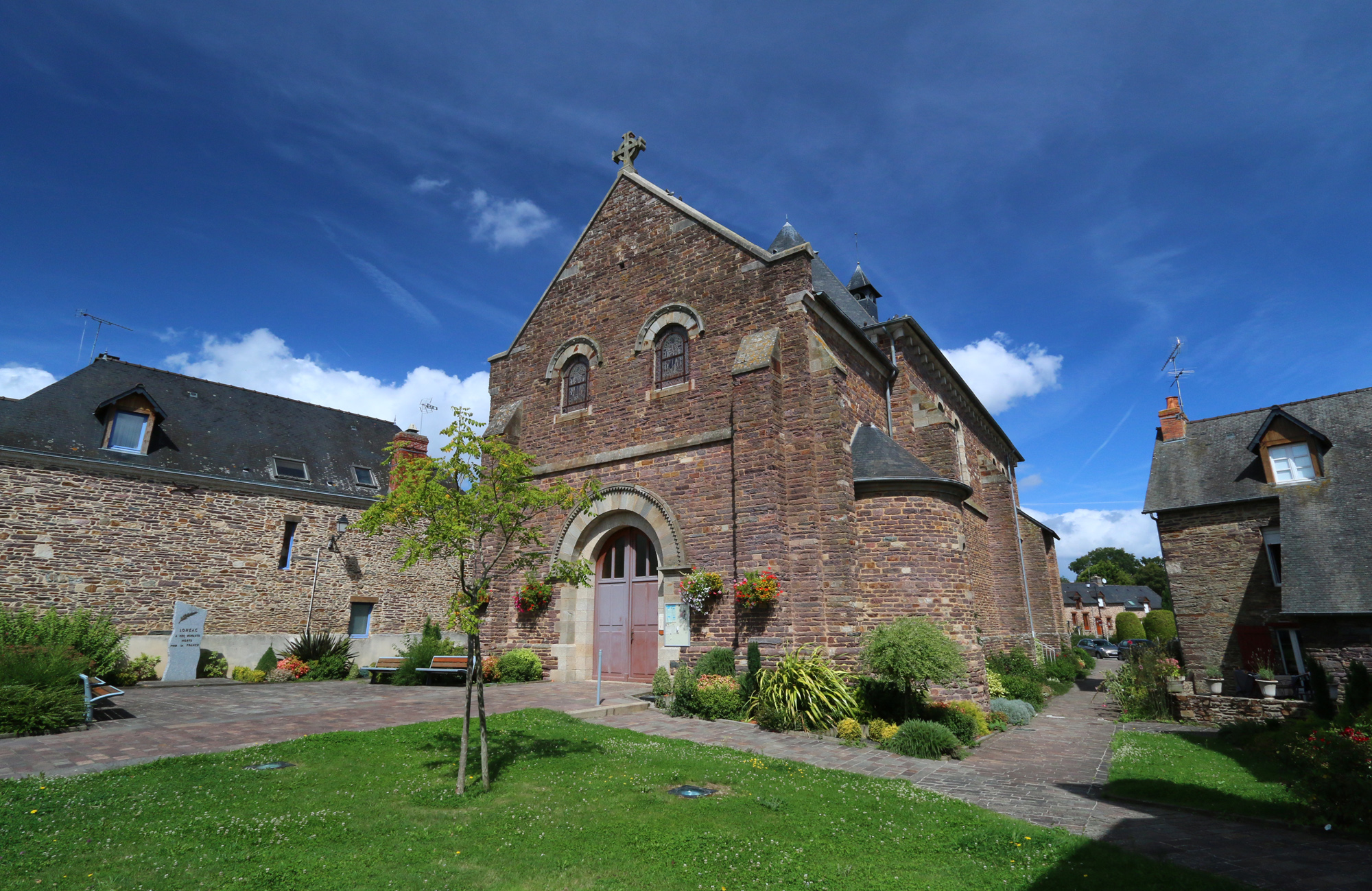
Church of Saint-André

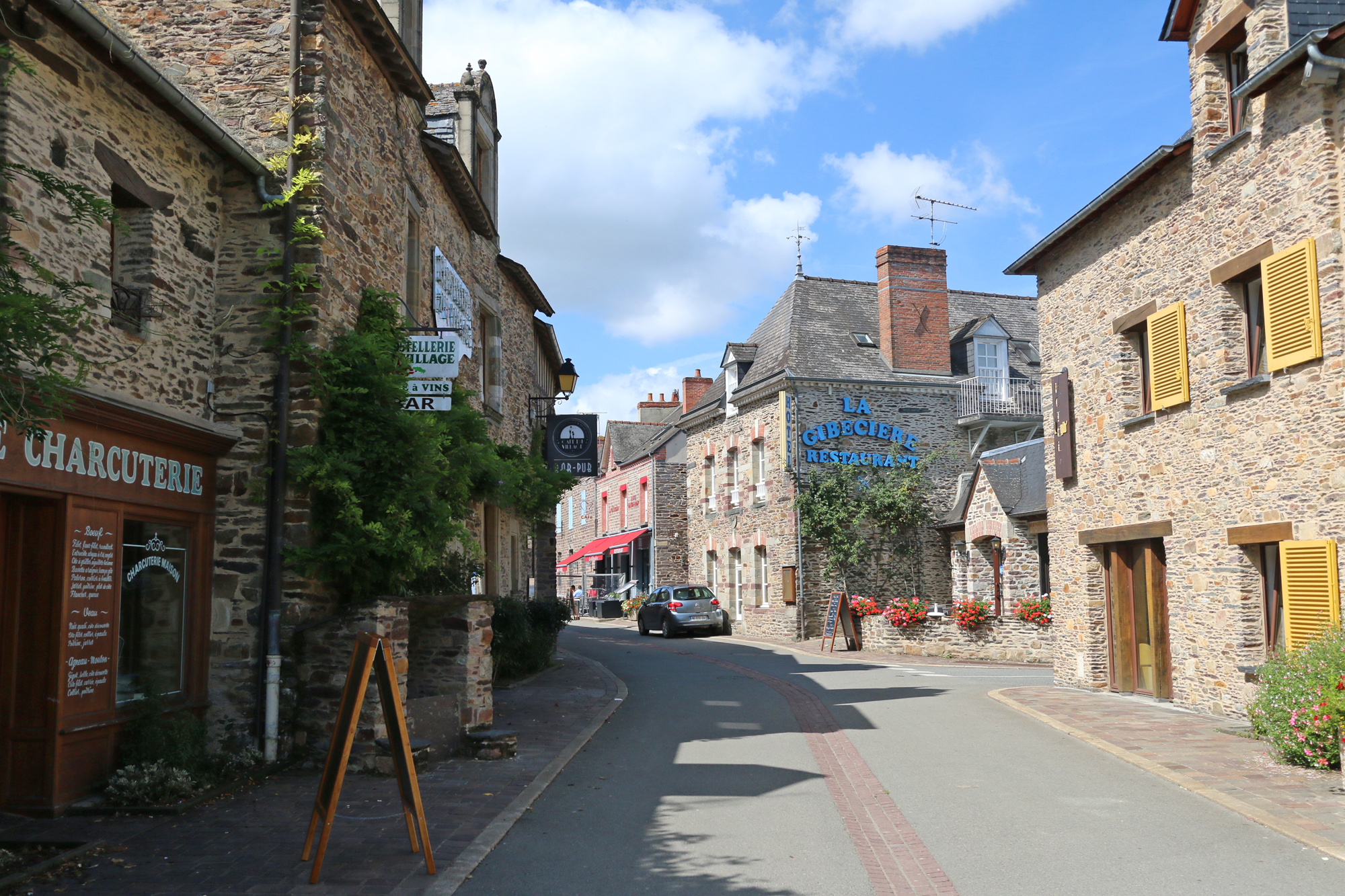
Rue de la Poste

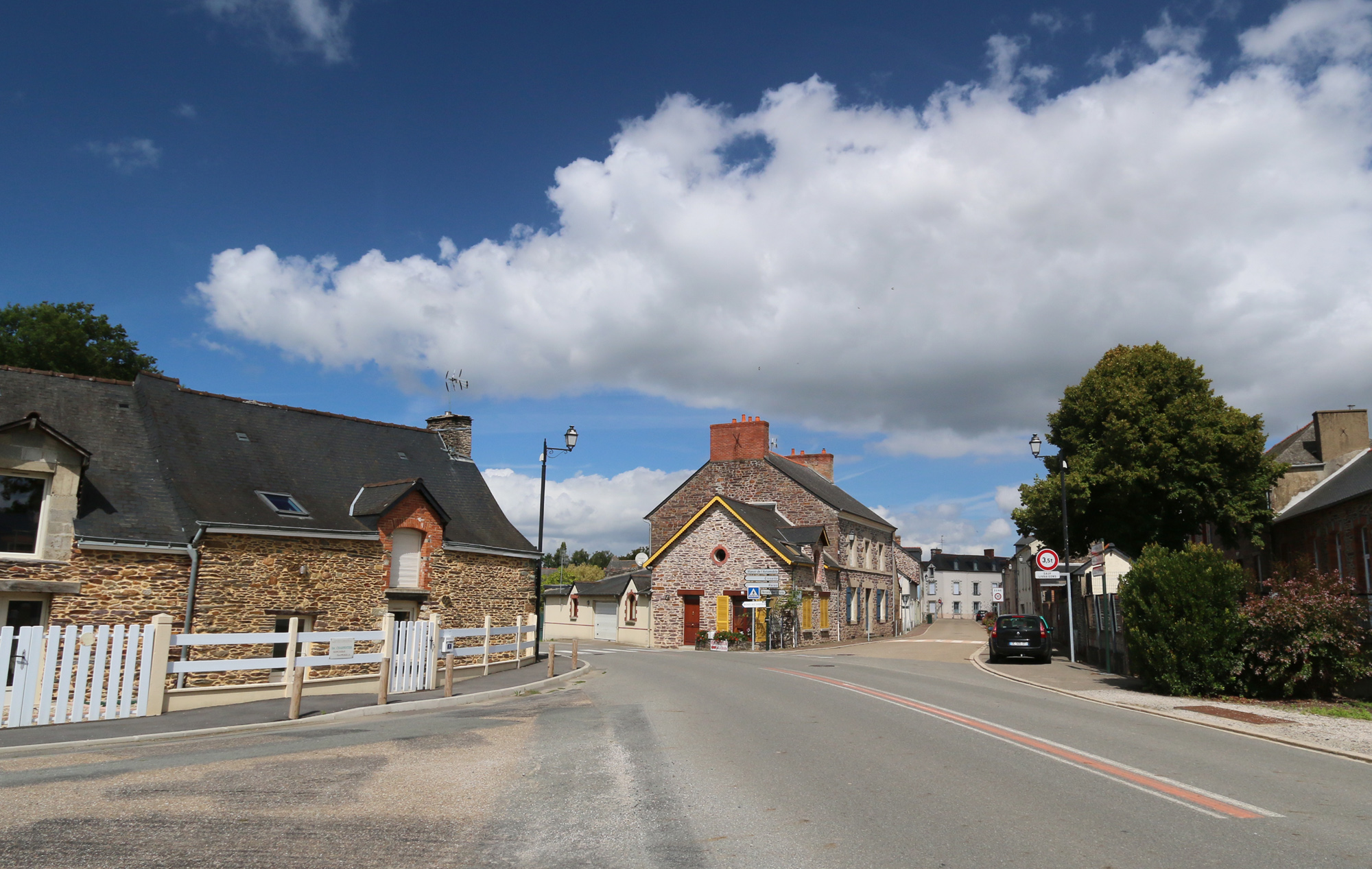
Rue de Châteaubriant, Village of Lohéac

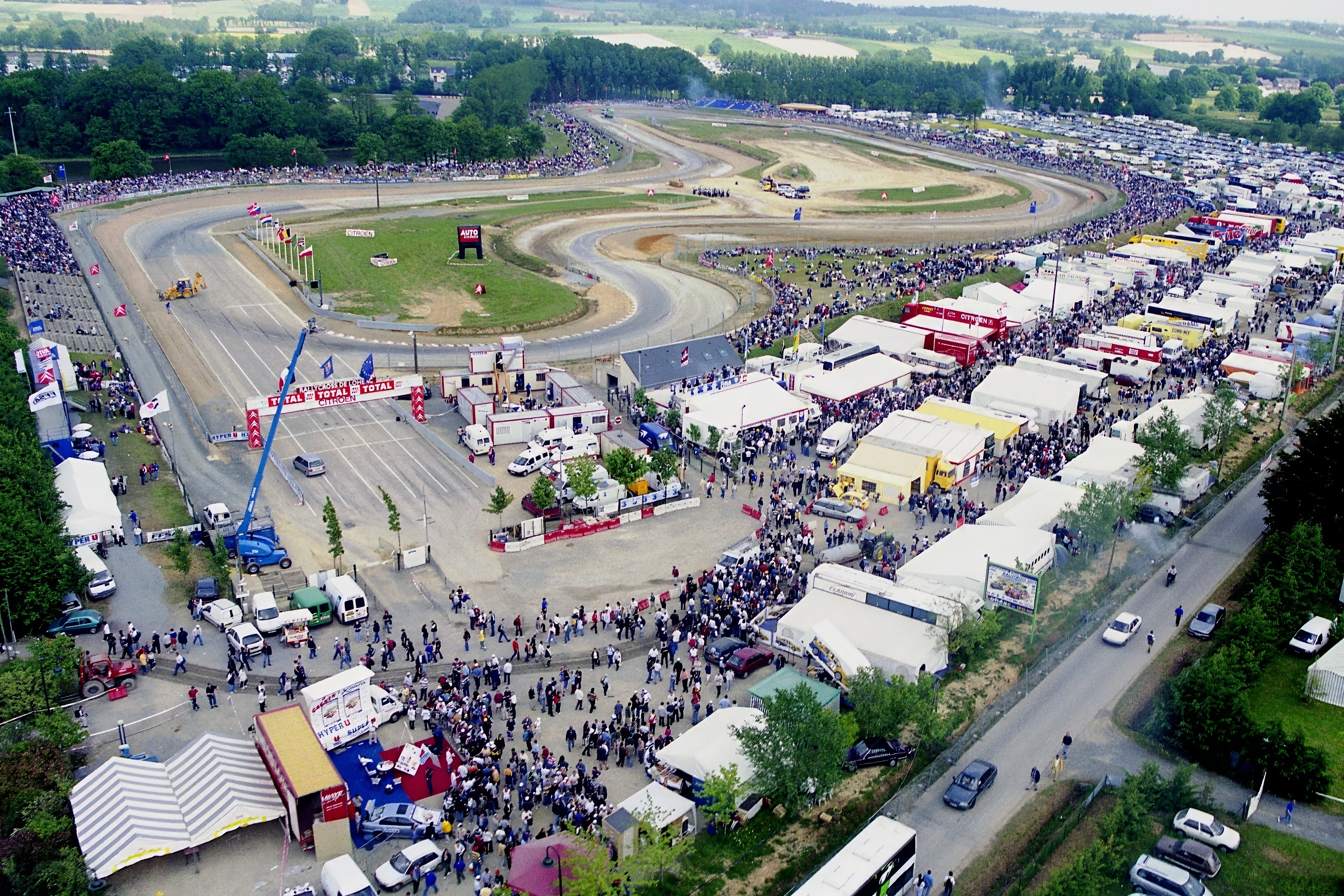
Circuit de Lohéac (Rallycross venue)

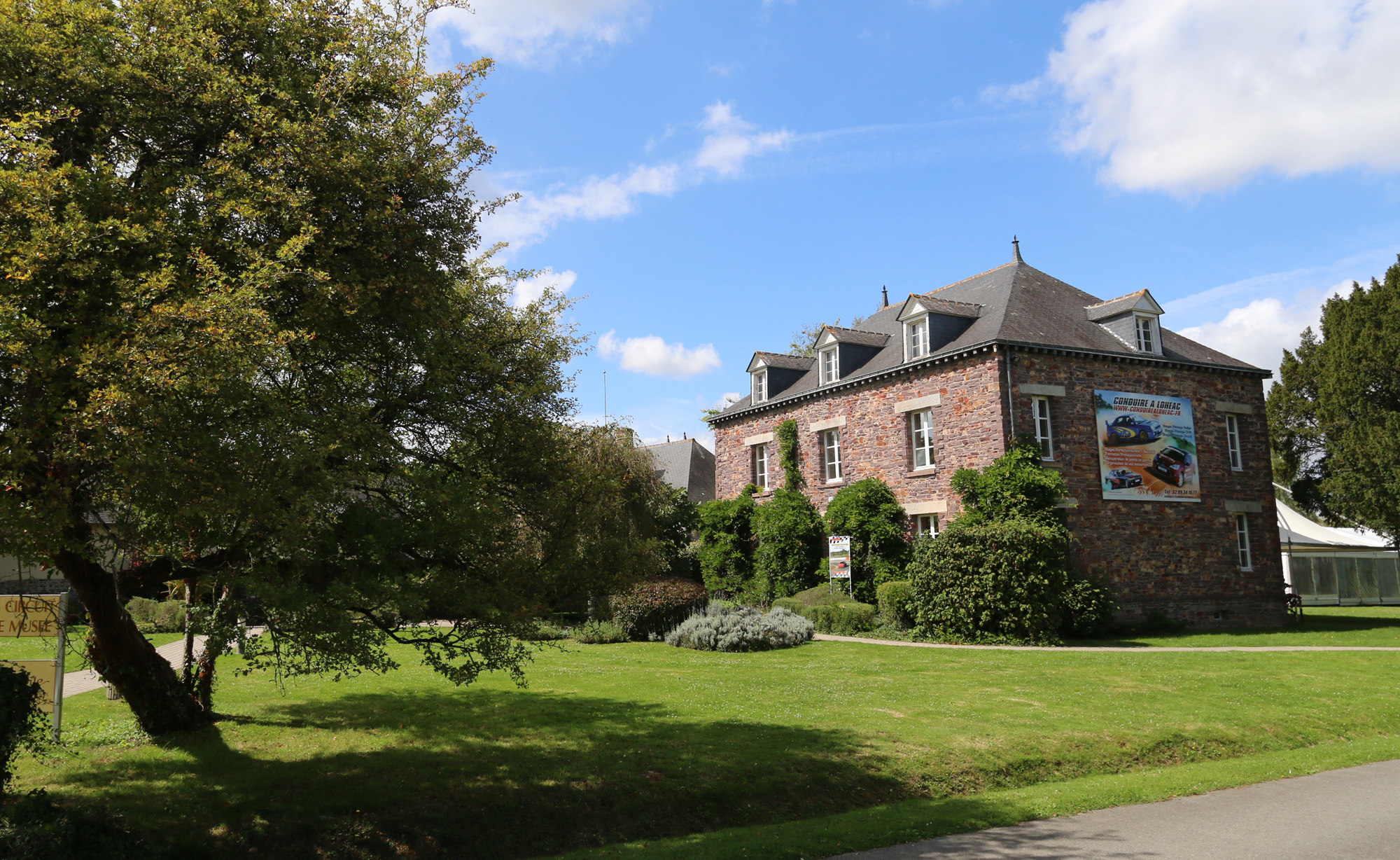
Manor of the automobile (car/racecar museum)

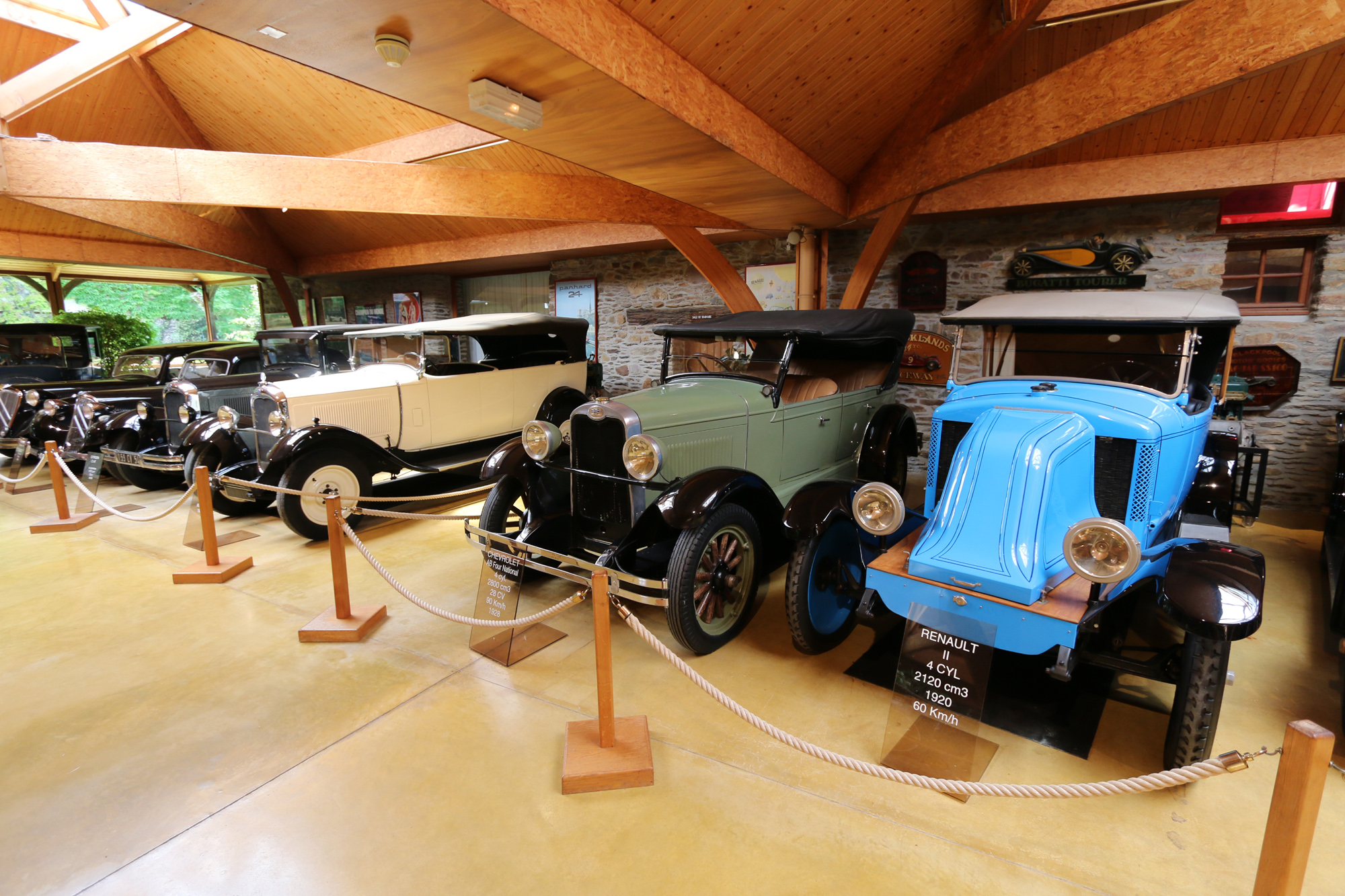
The automobiles of 1920, in the manor

== Population ==
Inhabitants of Lohéac are called Lohéaciens in French.

Historical population
Year	Pop.	±% p.a.
1968	404	—
1975	406	+0.07%
1982	449	+1.45%
1990	508	+1.56%
1999	603	+1.92%
2007	683	+1.57%
2012	655	−0.83%
2017	649	−0.18%
2023	702	+1.32%
Source: INSEE

== See also ==
- Communes of the Ille-et-Vilaine department
