= 2011 European Rallycross Championship =

FIA European Rallycross Championship season

Seasons
- ← 2010 2012 →

The 2011 European Rallycross Championship was the thirty fifth season of the FIA European Championships for Rallycross Drivers. The season consisted of ten rounds and started on 24 April with the British round at Lydden Hill Race Circuit. The season ended on 2 October, at Czech Republic at Sosnová.

== Calendar ==
Round	Event	Dates	Venue	Class	Final Winner	Car	Team	Report
1	(United Kingdom) Euro RX of Great Britain	24–25 April	Lydden Hill Race Circuit, Wootton					
1	(United Kingdom) Euro RX of Great Britain	24–25 April	Lydden Hill Race Circuit, Wootton	Supercar	(Norway) Sverre Isachsen	Ford Focus	(Norway) Sverre Isachsen	report
1	(United Kingdom) Euro RX of Great Britain	24–25 April	Lydden Hill Race Circuit, Wootton	Super1600	(Norway) Andreas Bakkerud	Renault Clio	(Finland) Set Promotion	report
1	(United Kingdom) Euro RX of Great Britain	24–25 April	Lydden Hill Race Circuit, Wootton	TouringCar	(Norway) Lars Øivind Enerberg	Ford Fiesta	(Norway) Lars Øivind Enerberg	report
2	Euro RX of Portugal	14–15 May	Pista Automóvel de Montalegre, Montalegre					
2	Euro RX of Portugal	14–15 May	Pista Automóvel de Montalegre, Montalegre	Supercar	(United States) Tanner Foust	Ford Fiesta	(United States) Rockstar Energy Rallycross Team	report
2	Euro RX of Portugal	14–15 May	Pista Automóvel de Montalegre, Montalegre	Super1600	(Norway) Andreas Bakkerud	Renault Clio	(Finland) Set Promotion	report
2	Euro RX of Portugal	14–15 May	Pista Automóvel de Montalegre, Montalegre	TouringCar	(Norway) Lars Øivind Enerberg	Ford Fiesta	(Norway) Lars Øivind Enerberg	report
3	Euro RX of France	21–22 May	Circuit d'Essay, Essay					
3	Euro RX of France	21–22 May	Circuit d'Essay, Essay	Supercar	(Norway) Frode Holte	Volvo C30	(Norway) Frode Holte	report
3	Euro RX of France	21–22 May	Circuit d'Essay, Essay	Super1600	(France) Steven Bossard	Citroën C2	(France) Steven Bossard	report
3	Euro RX of France	21–22 May	Circuit d'Essay, Essay	TouringCar	(Norway) Lars Øivind Enerberg	Ford Fiesta	(Norway) Lars Øivind Enerberg	report
4	Euro RX of Norway	25–26 June	Lånkebanen, Hell, Norway, Hell					
4	Euro RX of Norway	25–26 June	Lånkebanen, Hell, Norway, Hell	Supercar	(Norway) Mats Lysen	Renault Clio	(Norway) Mats Lysen Motorsport	report
4	Euro RX of Norway	25–26 June	Lånkebanen, Hell, Norway, Hell	Super1600	(Russia) Ildar Rakhmatullin	Renault Twingo	(Russia) SK Suvar Motorsport	report
4	Euro RX of Norway	25–26 June	Lånkebanen, Hell, Norway, Hell	TouringCar	(Norway) Lars Øivind Enerberg	Ford Fiesta	(Norway) Lars Øivind Enerberg	report
5	Euro RX of Sweden	2–3 July	Höljesbanan, Höljes					
5	Euro RX of Sweden	2–3 July	Höljesbanan, Höljes	Supercar	(United States) Tanner Foust	Ford Fiesta	(United States) Rockstar Energy Rallycross Team	report
5	Euro RX of Sweden	2–3 July	Höljesbanan, Höljes	Super1600	(Poland) Krzysztof Skorupski	Volkswagen Polo	(Poland) Krzysztof Skorupski	report
5	Euro RX of Sweden	2–3 July	Höljesbanan, Höljes	TouringCar	(Norway) Lars Øivind Enerberg	Ford Fiesta	(Norway) Lars Øivind Enerberg	report
6	Euro RX of Belgium	6–7 August	Duivelsbergcircuit, Maasmechelen					
6	Euro RX of Belgium	6–7 August	Duivelsbergcircuit, Maasmechelen	Supercar	(Russia) Timur Timerzyanov	Citroën C4	(Sweden) Namus Hansen Motorsport	report
6	Euro RX of Belgium	6–7 August	Duivelsbergcircuit, Maasmechelen	Super1600	(United Kingdom) Julian Godfrey	Ford Fiesta ST	(United Kingdom) Julian Godfrey	report
6	Euro RX of Belgium	6–7 August	Duivelsbergcircuit, Maasmechelen	TouringCar	(Czech Republic) Roman Častoral	Opel Astra	(Czech Republic) Czech National Team	report
7	Euro RX of the Netherlands	13–14 August	Eurocircuit, Valkenswaard					
7	Euro RX of the Netherlands	13–14 August	Eurocircuit, Valkenswaard	Supercar	(Norway) Sverre Isachsen	Ford Focus	(Norway) Sverre Isachsen	report
7	Euro RX of the Netherlands	13–14 August	Eurocircuit, Valkenswaard	Super1600	(Norway) Andreas Bakkerud	Renault Clio	(Finland) Set Promotion	report
7	Euro RX of the Netherlands	13–14 August	Eurocircuit, Valkenswaard	TouringCar	(Czech Republic) Roman Častoral	Opel Astra	(Czech Republic) Czech National Team	report
8	Euro RX of Austria	3–4 September	PS Racing Center, Greinbach					
8	Euro RX of Austria	3–4 September	PS Racing Center, Greinbach	Supercar	(Norway) Sverre Isachsen	Ford Focus	(Norway) Sverre Isachsen	report
8	Euro RX of Austria	3–4 September	PS Racing Center, Greinbach	Super1600	(Poland) Krzysztof Skorupski	Volkswagen Polo	(Poland) Krzysztof Skorupski	report
8	Euro RX of Austria	3–4 September	PS Racing Center, Greinbach	TouringCar	(Czech Republic) Roman Častoral	Opel Astra	(Czech Republic) Czech National Team	report
9	Euro RX of Poland	10–11 September	Tor Słomczyn, Słomczyn					
9	Euro RX of Poland	10–11 September	Tor Słomczyn, Słomczyn	Supercar	(Norway) Sverre Isachsen	Ford Focus	(Norway) Sverre Isachsen	report
9	Euro RX of Poland	10–11 September	Tor Słomczyn, Słomczyn	Super1600	(Poland) Krzysztof Skorupski	Volkswagen Polo	(Poland) Krzysztof Skorupski	report
9	Euro RX of Poland	10–11 September	Tor Słomczyn, Słomczyn	TouringCar	(Norway) Lars Øivind Enerberg	Ford Fiesta	(Norway) Lars Øivind Enerberg	report
10	Euro RX of the Czech Republic	1–2 October	Autodrom Sosnová, Sosnová					
10	Euro RX of the Czech Republic	1–2 October	Autodrom Sosnová, Sosnová	Supercar	(Norway) Sverre Isachsen	Ford Focus	(Norway) Sverre Isachsen	report
10	Euro RX of the Czech Republic	1–2 October	Autodrom Sosnová, Sosnová	Super1600	(Norway) Andreas Bakkerud	Renault Clio	(Finland) Set Promotion	report
10	Euro RX of the Czech Republic	1–2 October	Autodrom Sosnová, Sosnová	TouringCar	(Norway) Lars Øivind Enerberg	Ford Fiesta	(Norway) Lars Øivind Enerberg	report

== Championship standings ==
- For the drivers' championship, only the best four results from the first five rounds and the best four results from the remaining five rounds could be retained by each driver.
  Points are awarded on a 20–17–15–13–12–11–10–9–8–7-6-5-4-3-2-1 scale for first 15 drivers.

=== Supercar ===
Pos.	Driver	GBR (United Kingdom)	POR (Portugal)	FRA (France)	NOR (Norway)	SWE (Sweden)	Part 1	BEL (Belgium)	NED (Netherlands)	AUT (Austria)	POL (Poland)	CZE (Czech Republic)	Part 2	Points
1	(Norway) Sverre Isachsen	1	7	(12)	2	4	60	(13)	1	1	1	1	80	140
2	(United States) Tanner Foust	(8)	1	6	6	1	62	8	DSQ	3	3	3	54	116
3	(Russia) Timur Timerzyanov	5	3	5	3	(15)	54	1	(11)	2	7	4	60	114
4	(Norway) Frode Holte	7	4	1	10	(13)	50	2	(NC)	5	6	5	52	102
5	(Norway) Mats Lysen	(11)	9	2	1	7	55	(15)	6	7	10	6	39	94
6	(Finland) Toomas Heikkinen	6	(NC)	8	5	3	47	7	7	10	4	(14)	40	87
7	(United Kingdom) Liam Doran	4	5	3	9	(10)	48	3	(15)	9	11	11	35	83
8	(Norway) Ludvig Hunsbedt	10		11	NC	6	26	5	2	(11)	8	10	45	71
9	(Sweden) Stig-Olov Walfridsson	(16)	6	14	4	8	36	11	(16)	4	5	13	35	71
10	(France) Davy Jeanney	3	8	(16)	12	11	35	18	12	6	2		33	68
11	(United Kingdom) Andy Scott	12	10	(28)	NC	15	14	4	3	(14)	12	12	38	52
12	(Sweden) Andréas Eriksson	9	2	10	(11)	5	44						0	44
13	(France) Marc Laboulle	2	12	11		(26)	28	9	10				15	43
14	(Belgium) Michaël De Keersmaecker	NC		7	17	NC	10	6	4		16	9	33	43
15	(Sweden) Kenneth Hansen					2	17					2	17	34
16	(Norway) Morten Bermingrud			NC	15	9	10	12	9	NC		NC	13	23
17	(France) Jean-Luc Pailler	NC		19	13	14	7	17	5				12	19
18	(Germany) René Münnich	(17)	11	NC	19	12	11	20	13			15	6	17
19	(France) Philippe Tollemer			14			13						0	13
20	(United Kingdom) Kevin Procter						0	24		12	9	NC	13	13
21	(Norway) Svein Roger Andersen	15		25	20	19	2					8	9	11
22	(Norway) Henning Solberg				7		10						0	10
22=	(Sweden) Per Eklund					24	0					7	10	10
24	(Austria) Peter Ramler						0			8		16	10	10
25	(Norway) Knut Ove Børseth				8	17	9						0	9
25=	(Norway) Guttorm Lindefjell					21	0		8				9	9
27	(Czech Republic) Pavel Koutný	19			16	18	1	10	NC	18		DSQ	7	8
28	(United Kingdom) Pat Doran	13					4				13		4	8
29	(Italy) Jos Kuijpers	NC		17			0	14	14	15		NC	8	8
30	(Norway) Stein Egil Jenssen	14			14	25	6					20	0	6
31	(Portugal) Pedro Matos		13				4						0	4
31=	(France) Samuel Peu			13			4						0	4
31=	(Norway) Ole Kristian Nøttveit						0	22		13	NC		4	4
34	(Norway) Frank Valle	(NC)	14	20	NC	28	3						0	3
34=	(Poland) Łukasz Zoll						0				14		3	3
36	(Portugal) Joaquim Santos		15				2						0	2
36=	(France) Gaëtan Sérazin			15			2						0	2
36=	(Belgium) François Duval						0	15					2	2
36=	(Poland) Marcin Wicik						0				15		2	2
40	(Austria) Alois Höller						0			16			1	1
Pos.	Driver	GBR (United Kingdom)	POR (Portugal)	FRA (France)	NOR (Norway)	SWE (Sweden)	Part 1	BEL (Belgium)	NED (Netherlands)	AUT (Austria)	POL (Poland)	CZE (Czech Republic)	Part 2	Points

=== Super1600 ===
Pos.	Driver	GBR (United Kingdom)	POR (Portugal)	FRA (France)	NOR (Norway)	SWE (Sweden)	Part 1	BEL (Belgium)	NED (Netherlands)	AUT (Austria)	POL (Poland)	CZE (Czech Republic)	Part 2	Points
1	(Norway) Andreas Bakkerud	1	1	2	2	(6)	74	2	1	(11)	3	1	72	146
2	(Denmark) Ulrik Linnemann	4	2	(NC)	4	3	58	4	3	6	(10)	4	52	110
3	(Poland) Krzysztof Skorupski					1	20	(9)	6	1	1	2	68	88
4	(Sweden) Johan Larsson	10	4	(14)	6	4	44	8	(9)	7	4	7	42	86
5	(Germany) Clemens Meyer	6	12	(NC)	5	2	45	6	15	4	7	(16)	36	81
6	(Finland) Jussi-Petteri Leppihalme				3	9	23	(10)	2	9	2	6	53	76
7	(Sweden) David Johansson		5	4	7	5	47	12	10	8	15		23	70
8	(Czech Republic) Zdeněk Čermák	3	6	11	12	(NC)	38	13	7	(16)	11	8	29	67
9	(Norway) Daniel Holten	7	3		NC	NC	25	7	8	(NC)	14	5	34	59
10	(Russia) Ildar Rakhmatullin	14	8	(19)	1	14	41	15	5	15			16	57
11	(Czech Republic) Jaroslav Kalný		7	3	9	10	40	22	NC	2		NC	17	57
12	(Austria) Christian Petrakovits	5		15		22	14	3	11	5		12	38	52
13	(United Kingdom) Julian Godfrey	2					17	1	4				33	50
14	(Czech Republic) Ondřej Smetana	9		9	8	12	30	(14)	14	10	12	13	19	49
15	(Czech Republic) Stanislav Šusta	12	11	22		14	14	16	(18)	12	5	10	25	39
16	(France) Steven Bossard			1			20					3	15	35
17	(Sweden) Mattias Thörjesson	15	9	17		7	20	11	NC			9	14	34
18	(Russia) Vadim Makarov						0	5		3			27	27
19	(Norway) Thommy Tesdal				10	8	16						0	16
20	(France) Laurent Chartrain			5			12						0	12
21	(France) David Olivier			6			11						0	11
21=	(France) Julien Debin					NC	0				6		11	11
23	(France) Andréa Dubourg			7			10						0	10
24	(Germany) Mandie August	(17)	13	31	15	24	6	(NC)	25	NC	13	17	4	10
25	(Norway) Anders Bjørland Hansen	8		NC		NC	9						0	9
25=	(France) Adeline Sangnier			8			9						0	9
25=	(Latvia) Reinis Safonovs					25	0				8	20	8	8
28	(Czech Republic) Pavel Vimmer						0	18			9	NC	8	8
29	(Belgium) Davy Van Den Branden	13		21			4	19	13				4	8
30	(Czech Republic) Václav Veverka		15	22	14	23	5	25	20	14		19	3	8
31	(Portugal) Mário Barbosa		10				7						0	7
31=	(France) Eric Guillemette			10			7						0	7
33	(Czech Republic) Karel Lehmann						0			13		14	7	7
34	(Germany) Marc Basseng						0					11	6	6
35	(France) Guillaume Bergeon			12			5						0	5
35=	(Czech Republic) Michaela Kalná			18	12	18	5	24	NC			18	0	5
35=	(Belgium) Andy Martin						0	23	12				5	5
38	(France) Maximilien Eveno			13			4						0	4
38=	(Denmark) Peter Lindgaard				13	17	4						0	4
38=	(Norway) Asgeir Taraldsen				NC	13	4						0	4
41	(Germany) Ralph Wilhelm	14		DNS			3	33	21				0	3
41=	(Portugal) Helder Ribeiro		14				3						0	3
43	(Norway) Rune Jøranli				16	15	3						0	3
44	(Czech Republic) Jan Skála						0					15	2	2
45	(Netherlands) Willem Veltman	16					1	29	26				0	1
45=	(Portugal) Nuno Ralha		16				1						0	1
45=	(France) Mickaël Martin			16			1						0	1
45=	(Denmark) Rune Birkholt Staudt					16	1						0	1
45=	(Belgium) Dave Van Beers						0	26	16				1	1
50	(Poland) Robert Czarnecki						0				16		1	1
51	(Lithuania) Vaidas Navickas	DSQ					0						0	0
Pos.	Driver	GBR (United Kingdom)	POR (Portugal)	FRA (France)	NOR (Norway)	SWE (Sweden)	Part 1	BEL (Belgium)	NED (Netherlands)	AUT (Austria)	POL (Poland)	CZE (Czech Republic)	Part 2	Points

=== TouringCar ===
Pos.	Driver	GBR (United Kingdom)	POR (Portugal)	FRA (France)	NOR (Norway)	SWE (Sweden)	Part 1	BEL (Belgium)	NED (Netherlands)	AUT (Austria)	POL (Poland)	CZE (Czech Republic)	Part 2	Points
1	(Norway) Lars Øivind Enerberg	(1)	1	1	1	1	80	2	(6)	5	1	1	69	149
2	(Czech Republic) Roman Častoral	2	4	5		5	54	1	1	1	(2)	2	77	131
3	(Republic of Ireland) Derek Tohill	6	2	6	2	(11)	56	(4)	2	3	4	3	60	116
4	(Belgium) Koen Pauwels	3	3	2	7		57	3	4	2	(5)	5	57	114
5	(Norway) Per Magne Røyrås	4		3	6	6	50	5	3		6		38	88
6	(Norway) David Nordgård	5	7	4	11	DNS	41	7	10		3	NC	32	73
7	(Sweden) Robin Olsson	7	5	9	(16)	12	35	9	12	4	8		35	70
8	(Sweden) Anton Marklund				10	3	22	11	5			4	31	53
9	(Belgium) Jos Sterkens			NC			0	6	(9)	6	7	8	41	41
10	(Belgium) Ivo Van Den Brandt	9		8			17	10	NC	8			16	33
11	(Norway) Ole Håbjørg				3	2	32						0	32
12	(Denmark) Jakob Teil Hansen					9	8		7			6	21	29
13	(Belgium) Patrick Mertens	(NC)	6	7	14	17	24	12					5	29
14	(Hungary) György Fodor						0	15	13	7	9	10	29	29
15	(Sweden) Lars Rosendahl				12	14	8	NC	8			7	19	27
16	(Netherlands) Mandy Kasse	8		10			16		14			9	11	27
17	(Belgium) Jean-Michel Laurant	10	8	11	15	22	24	16	16	NC			2	26
18	(Norway) Vegar Åslund				4	8	22						0	22
19	(Norway) Tom Daniel Tånevik				8	7	19						0	19
20	(Finland) John Karlsson				NC	4	13						0	13
21	(Norway) Henning Nyberg				5	NC	12						0	12
22	(Netherlands) Ko Kasse						0	8					9	9
23	(Norway) Hans Kristian Ask				9	18	8						0	8
23=	(Austria) Leopold Haiden						0			9			8	8
25	(Sweden) Daniel Lundh					10	7						0	7
26	(Belgium) Pedro Bonnet						0	11					6	6
27	(Norway) Steinar Stokke				13	15	6						0	6
27=	(Netherlands) Christ Moelands						0	13	15				6	6
29	(Norway) Jan Gabrielsen					13	4						0	4
30	(Netherlands) Louis de Haas					21	0	14					3	3
31	(Finland) Tero Parkkinen					16	1						0	1
Pos.	Driver	GBR (United Kingdom)	POR (Portugal)	FRA (France)	NOR (Norway)	SWE (Sweden)	Part 1	BEL (Belgium)	NED (Netherlands)	AUT (Austria)	POL (Poland)	CZE (Czech Republic)	Part 2	Points
