= 2012 European Rallycross Championship =

FIA European Rallycross Championship season

Seasons
- ← 2011 2013 →

The 2012 European Rallycross Championship was the thirty sixth season of the FIA European Championships for Rallycross Drivers. The season consisted of ten rounds and started on 8 April with the British round at Lydden Hill Race Circuit. The season ended on 30 September, at Germany at Estering.

== Calendar ==
Round	Event	Dates	Venue	Class	Final Winner	Car	Team	Report
1	(United Kingdom) Euro RX of Great Britain	8–9 April	Lydden Hill Race Circuit, Wootton					
1	(United Kingdom) Euro RX of Great Britain	8–9 April	Lydden Hill Race Circuit, Wootton	Supercar	(United States) Tanner Foust	Ford Fiesta	(Sweden) Olsbergs MSE	report
1	(United Kingdom) Euro RX of Great Britain	8–9 April	Lydden Hill Race Circuit, Wootton	Super1600	(Finland) Jussi-Petteri Leppihalme	Renault Clio	(Finland) Set Promotion	report
1	(United Kingdom) Euro RX of Great Britain	8–9 April	Lydden Hill Race Circuit, Wootton	TouringCar	(Sweden) Anton Marklund	Ford Fiesta	(Sweden) Marklund Motorsport	report
2	Euro RX of France	28–29 April	Circuit de l'Ouest Parisien, Dreux					
2	Euro RX of France	28–29 April	Circuit de l'Ouest Parisien, Dreux	Supercar	(United Kingdom) Kevin Procter	Ford Focus	(United Kingdom) Kevin Procter	report
2	Euro RX of France	28–29 April	Circuit de l'Ouest Parisien, Dreux	Super1600	(Norway) Andreas Bakkerud	Renault Twingo	(Finland) Set Promotion	report
2	Euro RX of France	28–29 April	Circuit de l'Ouest Parisien, Dreux	TouringCar	(Republic of Ireland) Derek Tohill	Ford Fiesta	(Republic of Ireland) Derek Tohill	report
3	Euro RX of Austria	26–27 May	PS Racing Center, Greinbach					
3	Euro RX of Austria	26–27 May	PS Racing Center, Greinbach	Supercar	(Russia) Timur Timerzyanov	Citroën DS3	(Sweden) Namus Hansen Motorsport	report
3	Euro RX of Austria	26–27 May	PS Racing Center, Greinbach	Super1600	(Denmark) Ulrik Linnemann	Peugeot 207	(Denmark) Linnemann Motorsport	report
3	Euro RX of Austria	26–27 May	PS Racing Center, Greinbach	TouringCar	(Sweden) Robin Larsson	Škoda Fabia	(Sweden) Robin Larsson	report
4	Euro RX of Hungary	2–3 June	Nyirád Motorsport Centrum, Nyirád					
4	Euro RX of Hungary	2–3 June	Nyirád Motorsport Centrum, Nyirád	Supercar	(Russia) Timur Timerzyanov	Citroën DS3	(Sweden) Namus Hansen Motorsport	report
4	Euro RX of Hungary	2–3 June	Nyirád Motorsport Centrum, Nyirád	Super1600	(Norway) Andreas Bakkerud	Renault Twingo	(Finland) Set Promotion	report
4	Euro RX of Hungary	2–3 June	Nyirád Motorsport Centrum, Nyirád	TouringCar	(Republic of Ireland) Derek Tohill	Ford Fiesta	(Republic of Ireland) Derek Tohill	report
5	Euro RX of Norway	23–24 June	Lånkebanen, Hell					
5	Euro RX of Norway	23–24 June	Lånkebanen, Hell	Supercar	(United States) Tanner Foust	Ford Fiesta	(Sweden) Olsbergs MSE	report
5	Euro RX of Norway	23–24 June	Lånkebanen, Hell	Super1600	(Russia) Ildar Rakhmatullin	Renault Twingo	(Russia) SK Suvar Motorsport	report
5	Euro RX of Norway	23–24 June	Lånkebanen, Hell	TouringCar	(Norway) Lars Øivind Enerberg	Ford Fiesta	(Norway) Lars Øivind Enerberg	report
6	Euro RX of Sweden	30 June–1 July	Höljesbanan, Höljes					
6	Euro RX of Sweden	30 June–1 July	Höljesbanan, Höljes	Supercar	(Russia) Timur Timerzyanov	Citroën DS3	(Sweden) Namus Hansen Motorsport	report
6	Euro RX of Sweden	30 June–1 July	Höljesbanan, Höljes	Super1600	(Denmark) Ulrik Linnemann	Peugeot 207	(Denmark) Linnemann Motorsport	report
6	Euro RX of Sweden	30 June–1 July	Höljesbanan, Höljes	TouringCar	(Sweden) Robin Larsson	Škoda Fabia	(Sweden) Robin Larsson	report
7	Euro RX of Belgium	4–5 August	Duivelsbergcircuit, Maasmechelen					
7	Euro RX of Belgium	4–5 August	Duivelsbergcircuit, Maasmechelen	Supercar	(Russia) Timur Timerzyanov	Citroën DS3	(Sweden) Namus Hansen Motorsport	report
7	Euro RX of Belgium	4–5 August	Duivelsbergcircuit, Maasmechelen	Super1600	(Poland) Krzysztof Skorupski	Volkswagen Polo	(Poland) Krzysztof Skorupski	report
7	Euro RX of Belgium	4–5 August	Duivelsbergcircuit, Maasmechelen	TouringCar	(Sweden) Robin Larsson	Škoda Fabia	(Sweden) Robin Larsson	report
8	Euro RX of the Netherlands	11–12 August	Eurocircuit, Valkenswaard					
8	Euro RX of the Netherlands	11–12 August	Eurocircuit, Valkenswaard	Supercar	(Russia) Timur Timerzyanov	Citroën DS3	(Sweden) Namus Hansen Motorsport	report
8	Euro RX of the Netherlands	11–12 August	Eurocircuit, Valkenswaard	Super1600	(Norway) Andreas Bakkerud	Renault Twingo	(Finland) Set Promotion	report
8	Euro RX of the Netherlands	11–12 August	Eurocircuit, Valkenswaard	TouringCar	(Sweden) Anton Marklund	Ford Fiesta	(Sweden) Marklund Motorsport	report
9	Euro RX of Finland	22–23 September	Tykkimäen Moottorirata, Kouvola					
9	Euro RX of Finland	22–23 September	Tykkimäen Moottorirata, Kouvola	Supercar	(Russia) Timur Timerzyanov	Citroën DS3	(Sweden) Namus Hansen Motorsport	report
9	Euro RX of Finland	22–23 September	Tykkimäen Moottorirata, Kouvola	Super1600	(Finland) Jussi-Petteri Leppihalme	Renault Clio	(Finland) Set Promotion	report
9	Euro RX of Finland	22–23 September	Tykkimäen Moottorirata, Kouvola	TouringCar	(Sweden) Robin Larsson	Škoda Fabia	(Sweden) Robin Larsson	report
10	Euro RX of Germany	29–30 September	Estering, Buxtehude					
10	Euro RX of Germany	29–30 September	Estering, Buxtehude	Supercar	(United Kingdom) Liam Doran	Citroën DS3	(United Kingdom) Doran Motorsport	report
10	Euro RX of Germany	29–30 September	Estering, Buxtehude	Super1600	(Finland) Teemu Suninen	Renault Clio	(Finland) Set Promotion	report
10	Euro RX of Germany	29–30 September	Estering, Buxtehude	TouringCar	(Sweden) Robin Larsson	Škoda Fabia	(Sweden) Robin Larsson	report

== Championship standings ==
- For the drivers' championship, only the best four results from the first five rounds and the best four results from the remaining five rounds could be retained by each driver.
  Points are awarded on a 20–17–15–13–12–11–10–9–8–7-6-5-4-3-2-1 scale for first 15 drivers.

=== Supercar ===
Pos.	Driver	GBR (United Kingdom)	FRA (France)	AUT (Austria)	HUN (Hungary)	NOR (Norway)	Part 1	SWE (Sweden)	BEL (Belgium)	NED (Netherlands)	FIN (Finland)	GER (Germany)	Part 2	Points
1	(Russia) Timur Timerzyanov		4	1	1	3	68	1	1	1	1	(14)	80	148
2	(United Kingdom) Liam Doran	3	(8)	4	6	2	56		6	NC	2	1	48	104
3	(United States) Tanner Foust	1	13		2	1	61		2	6	6		39	100
4	(France) Davy Jeanney	(NC)	7	3	5	12	42	(NC)	3	2	8	2	58	100
5	(Belgium) Michaël De Keersmaecker	5	(15)	7	8	9	39	5	(8)	4	7	6	46	85
6	(Norway) Mats Lysen	2	(21)	NC	3	5	44	11	(14)	5	4	9	39	83
7	(Norway) Alexander Hvaal	(NC)	2	2	4	6	58	3	19	8		NC	24	82
8	(Sweden) Peter Hedström	14	(NC)	6	12	13	23	2	(18)	7	3	7	52	75
9	(Sweden) Stig-Olov Walfridsson	6	(19)	NC	11	4	30	4	7	(NC)	14	4	41	71
10	(United Kingdom) Kevin Procter	15	1	11	(NC)	11	33	15		12	18	13	10	43
11	(Italy) Jos Kuijpers	12	25	8	10		21		4	14			16	37
12	(Norway) Guttorm Lindefjell	4	(18)	12	7	15	30		13				4	34
13	(Norway) Morten Bermingrud	NC	10		14	19	10	7		NC		4	23	33
14	(United Kingdom) Andy Scott	8	14				12		13	NC	13	5	20	32
15	(Czech Republic) Pavel Koutný	13	22	NC	17		4	NC	10	9		8	24	28
16	(France) Jean-Luc Pailler	7	20			7	20	12	20				5	25
17	(Sweden) Mats Öhman						0	6			10	11	24	24
18	(France) Jérôme Grosset-Janin		6				11		5				12	23
19	(Norway) Frode Holte						0		11	3			21	21
20	(Norway) Daniel Holten					8	9	9					8	17
21	(Belgium) Patrick Van Mechelen	15	NC				2		9	18		10	15	17
22	(France) Marc Laboulle		3				15						0	15
23	(Norway) Svein Roger Andersen	10				14	10	14					3	13
24	(France) Gaëtan Sérazin		5				12						0	12
24=	(Austria) Peter Ramler			5			12						0	12
24=	(Sweden) Timmy Hansen						0				5		12	12
27	(Belgium) Jos Jansen	(21)	26	14	NC	18	3	18	16	10		18	8	11
28	(Sweden) Per-Gunnar Andersson						0	9					9	9
29	(Belgium) Jochen Coox						0		15	15		12	9	9
30	(United Kingdom) Julian Godfrey	9					8						0	8
30=	(France) Philippe Tollemer		9				8						0	8
30=	(Austria) Jürgen Weiß				9		8						0	8
30=	(Hungary) Zoltán Vass				9		8						0	8
30=	(Finland) Janne Kanerva						0				9		8	8
35=	(Austria) Tristan Ekker			10			7						0	7
35=	(Norway) Knut Ove Børseth					10	7						0	7
35=	(Norway) Frank Valle						0	10					7	7
38	(Belgium) Ronny Scheveneels						0		NC	11		16	7	7
39	(United Kingdom) Steve Hill	11					6						0	6
39=	(France) Fabien Pailler		11				6						0	6
39=	(Finland) Atro Määttä						0				11		6	6
42	(France) Hervé Lemonnier		12				5						0	5
42=	(Belgium) François Duval						0		12				5	5
42=	(Finland) Ari Perkiömäki						0				12		5	5
45	(Austria) Alois Höller			13			4						0	4
45=	(Hungary) Zoltán Harsányi				13		4						0	4
45=	(Netherlands) Gerard de Rooy						0			13			4	4
48	(France) Samuel Peu		15				2						0	2
48=	(Hungary) László Vnoucsek				15		2						0	2
48=	(Norway) Stein Egil Jenssen	17				NC	0	15				19	2	2
48=	(Finland) Jouni Frimodig						0				15		2	2
48=	(Netherlands) Wil Teurlings	19					0	21		NC		15	2	2
53	(Hungary) Attila Mózer				16		1						0	1
53=	(Norway) Tore Kristoffersen					16	1					NC	0	1
53=	(Netherlands) Ron Snoeck						0			16			1	1
53=	(Finland) Silvo Viitanen						0	19			16		1	1
Pos.	Driver	GBR (United Kingdom)	FRA (France)	AUT (Austria)	HUN (Hungary)	NOR (Norway)	Part 1	SWE (Sweden)	BEL (Belgium)	NED (Netherlands)	FIN (Finland)	GER (Germany)	Part 2	Points

=== Super1600 ===
Pos.	Driver	GBR (United Kingdom)	FRA (France)	AUT (Austria)	HUN (Hungary)	NOR (Norway)	Part 1	SWE (Sweden)	BEL (Belgium)	NED (Netherlands)	FIN (Finland)	GER (Germany)	Part 2	Points
1	(Norway) Andreas Bakkerud	2	1	2	1	(6)	74	3	(7)	1	5	2	64	138
2	(Poland) Krzysztof Skorupski	3	(8)	5	3	4	55	2	1	10	3	(13)	59	114
3	(Finland) Jussi-Petteri Leppihalme	1	2	4	(8)	8	59	8	3	(9)	1	7	54	113
4	(Denmark) Ulrik Linnemann	4	(5)	1	2	2	67	1	12	2	15	(16)	44	111
5	(Russia) Ildar Rakhmatullin		4	3	5	1	60	5	5	7	9		42	102
6	(Russia) Vadim Makarov	6	3	(13)	9	5	46	13	8	3	6		39	85
7	(Sweden) Eric Färén	12	(33)	12	4	12	32	4	(17)	13	4	12	35	67
8	(Finland) Teemu Suninen						0		6	5	2	1	60	60
9	(Russia) Timur Shigaboutdinov	11	12	11	(19)	7	27	(20)	14	4	13	10	27	54
10	(Germany) René Münnich	8	13	NC	13	13	21	14	4	(15)	14	4	32	53
11	(Sweden) David Johansson	7	(24)	8	6	9	38	12	15	11	20		13	51
12	(Czech Republic) Stanislav Šusta			9	18	12	13	9	9	(12)	11	5	34	47
13	(Finland) Joni Wiman						0		2	6	8	8	46	46
14	(Czech Republic) Zdeněk Čermák	NC	17	7	11		16	6	21	8		27	20	36
15	(Austria) Christian Petrakovits	10	27	6	10		25		11	NC		18	6	31
16	(Germany) Clemens Meyer					3	15	7	13				14	29
17	(Czech Republic) Jaroslav Vančík	5		12	7	17	27		24				0	27
18	(Russia) Sergey Zagumennov						0				10	3	22	22
19	(Czech Republic) Ondřej Smetana		16	20	14	11	10	11	22	17			6	16
20	(France) Eric Guillemette		6				11						0	11
20=	(Germany) Andreas Steffen						0					6	11	11
22	(Czech Republic) Jan Skála	9	14		20	NC	11	18					0	11
23	(Latvia) Reinis Nitišs						0	(16)	16	14	12	15	11	11
24	(France) David Deslandes		7				10						0	10
24=	(Russia) Rasul Minnikhanov						0	17	35		7	17	10	10
26	(Belgium) Davy Van Den Branden	15	23				2		23	19		9	8	10
27	(France) Laurent Chartrain		9				8						0	8
28	(United Kingdom) Julian Godfrey						0		10	16			8	8
29	(France) Adeline Sangnier		10				7						0	7
29=	(Norway) Thommy Tesdal	NC					0	10					7	7
31	(Germany) Mandie August	(17)	28	16	17	19	1	22	34	23	18	11	6	7
32	(France) Dorian Launay		11				6						0	6
33	(Czech Republic) Jaroslav Kalný	13	20	19	15		6						0	6
34	(Hungary) Gyula Lajos				12		5	NC	29				0	5
35	(Czech Republic) Václav Veverka Jr.	14		18	16		4		25				0	4
36	(France) Fabien Chanoine		14				3						0	3
36=	(Norway) Dag Nordstrand					14	3						0	3
36=	(Czech Republic) Pavel Vimmer	18	19	21	21		0		19	20		14	3	3
39	(France) Stéphane de Ganay		15				2						0	2
39=	(Austria) Klaus Freudenthaler			15			2						0	2
39=	(Czech Republic) Josef Šusta			23	22	15	2	23					0	2
39=	(Norway) Steve Røkland						0	15					2	2
43	(Belgium) Dave Van Beers	16	NC				1		30	21		19	0	1
43=	(Norway) Robert Aamodt					16	1						0	1
43=	(Estonia) Janno Ligur						0				16		1	1
Pos.	Driver	GBR (United Kingdom)	FRA (France)	AUT (Austria)	HUN (Hungary)	NOR (Norway)	Part 1	SWE (Sweden)	BEL (Belgium)	NED (Netherlands)	FIN (Finland)	GER (Germany)	Part 2	Points

=== TouringCar ===
Pos.	Driver	GBR (United Kingdom)	FRA (France)	AUT (Austria)	HUN (Hungary)	NOR (Norway)	Part 1	SWE (Sweden)	BEL (Belgium)	NED (Netherlands)	FIN (Finland)	GER (Germany)	Part 2	Points
1	(Sweden) Anton Marklund	1	2	2	2	(6)	71	2	2	1	2	(7)	71	142
2	(Republic of Ireland) Derek Tohill	3	1	(5)	1	2	72	4	9	3	4	(13)	49	121
3	(Czech Republic) Roman Častoral	2	3	3	3		62	7	4	(13)	3	3	53	115
4	(Sweden) Robin Larsson			1	NC	NC	20	1	1	(2)	1	1	80	100
5	(Belgium) Koen Pauwels	5	7	NC	5	7	44	13	7	6		14	28	72
6	(Sweden) Daniel Lundh					3	15	(6)	3	5	5	5	51	66
7	(Belgium) Pedro Bonnet	8	4	7	4		45		8	8			18	63
8	(Norway) Tom Daniel Tånevik	4	5	11		5	43	8				NC	9	52
9	(Sweden) Robin Olsson	12	8	6	7	(14)	35	(17)	NC	NC	9	15	10	45
10	(Sweden) Lars Rosendahl	NC		9		9	16	(NC)	6	4	NC	12	29	45
11	(Denmark) Jakob Teil Hansen			4			13	9		7		11	24	37
12	(Finland) Jari Järvenpää	9					8	3			6		26	34
13	(Norway) Lars Øivind Enerberg					1	20	DSQ				6	11	31
14	(Norway) David Nordgård	6	NC	NC		12	16	11				8	15	31
15	(Norway) Ole Håbjørg					NC	0	5				2	29	29
16	(Belgium) Nick Snoeys	16	10		6		19		13	11		NC	10	29
17	(Belgium) Ivo Van den Brandt	14	12	8	8		26	20	14			17	3	29
18	(Netherlands) Mandy Kasse	15	9				10		12	9		19	13	23
19	(Norway) Kim Steinsholt	7			NC	NC	10	19	5			18	12	22
20	(Sweden) Roger Enlund						0	NC			10	4	20	20
21	(Norway) Per Magne Røyrås	10				NC	7	12				9	13	20
22	(Norway) Jan Gabrielsen					13	4	10				10	14	18
23	(Netherlands) Christ Moelands	13	11				10		NC	10			7	17
24	(Norway) Henning Nyberg					4	13	NC					0	13
25	(Belgium) Jos Sterkens		6				11						0	11
26	(Netherlands) Louis de Haas						0		11	12			11	11
27	(Finland) Joni-Pekka Rajala						0				7		10	10
28	(Norway) Hans Kristian Ask					10	7	14					3	10
29	(Norway) Vegar Åslund					8	9	18					0	9
29=	(Finland) John Karlsson						0				8		9	9
31	(Belgium) Roger Lippens						0		10			16	8	8
32	(Hungary) György Fodor			10			7		NC				0	7
33	(Belgium) Patrick Mertens	11	DSQ				6						0	6
33=	(Norway) Steinar Stokke					11	6	NC					0	6
35	(Finland) Tero Parkkinen					15	2	15					2	4
36	(Norway) Kjetil Larsen						0	16					1	1
Pos.	Driver	GBR (United Kingdom)	FRA (France)	AUT (Austria)	HUN (Hungary)	NOR (Norway)	Part 1	SWE (Sweden)	BEL (Belgium)	NED (Netherlands)	FIN (Finland)	GER (Germany)	Part 2	Points
