= 2014 Global RallyCross Championship =

Seasons
- ← 2013 2015 →

The 2014 Red Bull Global RallyCross Championship was the fourth season of the Global RallyCross Championship. Reigning champion Toomas Heikkinen only competed at the X Games event, as he went to the World Rallycross Championship.

== Schedule ==
In July, it was announced that a second event would be held at the Port of Los Angeles event, to replace an event in Detroit which was cancelled.

Round	Event	Location	Date
1	Top Gear Festival	Bushy Park Circuit, St. Phillip, Barbados	May 17–18
2	X Games Austin	(United States) Circuit of the Americas, Austin, Texas	June 7
3	Volkswagen Rallycross DC	(United States) RFK Stadium, Washington, D.C.	June 21–22
4	Volkswagen Rallycross NY	(United States) Nassau Coliseum, Uniondale, New York	July 19–20
5	Red Bull Global Rallycross Charlotte	(United States) Charlotte Motor Speedway, Charlotte, North Carolina	July 25–26
6	Red Bull Global Rallycross Daytona	(United States) Daytona International Speedway, Daytona Beach, Florida	August 22–23
7	Port of Los Angeles Rallycross	(United States) Port of Los Angeles, Los Angeles, California	September 19–21
8	Port of Los Angeles Rallycross	(United States) Port of Los Angeles, Los Angeles, California	September 19–21
9	Red Bull Global Rallycross Seattle	(United States) DirtFish Rally School, Snoqualmie, Washington	September 26–27
10	Red Bull Global Rallycross Las Vegas	(United States) The Linq Hotel and Casino, Paradise, Nevada	November 5

== Entries ==
Constructor	Team	Car	No.	Driver(s)	Round(s)
Chevrolet	(Australia) BMI Racing	Chevrolet Sonic	04	(Australia) Sarah Burgess	6
Chevrolet	(United States) PMR Motorsports	Chevrolet Sonic	59	(United States) Pat Moro	2, 6, 10
Citroën	(United Kingdom) LD Motorsports	Citroën DS3	33	(United Kingdom) Liam Doran	2
Ford	(Sweden) OMSE2	Ford Fiesta ST	00	(Canada) Steve Arpin	All
Ford	(United States) SH Racing Rallycross	Ford Fiesta ST	07	(Brazil) Nelson Piquet Jr.	1–2, 4–8, 10
Ford	(United States) SH Racing Rallycross	Ford Fiesta ST	75	(Brazil) Nelson Piquet Jr.	3, 9
Ford	(United States) Barracuda Racing	Ford Fiesta ST	14	(United States) Austin Dyne	All
Ford	(Sweden) Olsbergs MSE	Ford Fiesta ST	18	(Sweden) Patrik Sandell	All
Ford	(Sweden) Olsbergs MSE	Ford Fiesta ST	31	(Finland) Joni Wiman	All
Ford	(Sweden) Olsbergs MSE	Ford Fiesta ST	48	(United States) Ricky Johnson	2
Ford	(United States) Rockstar Energy Drink	Ford Fiesta ST	38	(United States) Brian Deegan	1–2, 5, 9–10
Ford	(United States) Hoonigan Racing Division	Ford Fiesta ST	43	(United States) Ken Block	All
Hyundai	(New Zealand) Rhys Millen Racing	Hyundai Veloster Turbo	27	(New Zealand) Emma Gilmour	All
Hyundai	(New Zealand) Rhys Millen Racing	Hyundai Veloster Turbo	67	(New Zealand) Rhys Millen	All
Subaru	(United States) Subaru Rally Team USA	Subaru WRX STi	11	(Norway) Sverre Isachsen	All
Subaru	(United States) Subaru Rally Team USA	Subaru WRX STi	81	(United States) Bucky Lasek	All
Subaru	(United States) Subaru Rally Team USA	Subaru WRX STi	199	(United States) Travis Pastrana	2, 7–8
Subaru	(United States) Subaru Rally Team USA	Subaru WRX STi	715	(United Kingdom) David Higgins	9
Volkswagen	(United States) Volkswagen Andretti Rallycross	Volkswagen Polo	34	(United States) Tanner Foust	All
Volkswagen	(United States) Volkswagen Andretti Rallycross	Volkswagen Polo	77	(United States) Scott Speed	All
Volkswagen	(Sweden) Marklund Motorsport	Volkswagen Polo	57	(Finland) Toomas Heikkinen	2
Volkswagen	(Sweden) Marklund Motorsport	Volkswagen Polo	92	(Sweden) Anton Marklund	2

== Results and standings ==
=== Events ===
No.	Event	3rd Place	2nd Place	Winner	Winning team	Manufacturer
1	Top Gear Festival, Barbados	(United States) Brian Deegan	(Canada) Steve Arpin	(United States) Scott Speed	(United States) Volkswagen Andretti Rallycross	(Germany) Volkswagen
2	(United States) X Games Austin	(Brazil) Nelson Piquet Jr.	(United States) Bucky Lasek	(United States) Scott Speed	(United States) Volkswagen Andretti Rallycross	(Germany) Volkswagen
3	(United States) Volkswagen Rallycross DC	(Finland) Joni Wiman	(Brazil) Nelson Piquet Jr.	(Sweden) Patrik Sandell	(Sweden) Olsbergs MSE	(United States) Ford
4	(United States) Volkswagen Rallycross NY	(Brazil) Nelson Piquet Jr.	(United States) Scott Speed	(United States) Tanner Foust	(United States) Volkswagen Andretti Rallycross	(Germany) Volkswagen
5	(United States) Red Bull Global Rallycross Charlotte	(Brazil) Nelson Piquet Jr.	(Norway) Sverre Isachsen	(United States) Ken Block	(United States) Hoonigan Racing Division	(United States) Ford
6	(United States) Red Bull Global Rallycross Daytona	(United States) Bucky Lasek	(United States) Ken Block	(New Zealand) Rhys Millen	(New Zealand) Rhys Millen Racing	(South Korea) Hyundai
7	(United States) Port of Los Angeles Rallycross	(United States) Ken Block	(Finland) Joni Wiman	(United States) Scott Speed	(United States) Volkswagen Andretti Rallycross	(Germany) Volkswagen
8	(United States) Port of Los Angeles Rallycross	(Finland) Joni Wiman	(United States) Ken Block	(New Zealand) Rhys Millen	(New Zealand) Rhys Millen Racing	(South Korea) Hyundai
9	(United States) Red Bull Global Rallycross Seattle	(United States) Brian Deegan	(Finland) Joni Wiman	(Norway) Sverre Isachsen	(United States) Subaru Rally Team USA	(Japan) Subaru
10	(United States) Red Bull Global Rallycross Las Vegas	(United States) Bucky Lasek	(Finland) Joni Wiman	(United States) Ken Block	(United States) Hoonigan Racing Division	(United States) Ford

=== Drivers' championship ===
Points are awarded to event finishers using the following structure:

Position	1st	2nd	3rd	4th	5th	6th	7th	8th	9th	10th	Others
Points	50	45	40	35	30	25	20	15	10	5	1

- 3 Points for a Heat Win
- 2 Points for a Heat 2nd Place
- 1 Point for Heat Participation

==== Supercars ====
Pos.	Driver	Team	(Barbados) BAR	(United States) AUS	(United States) DC	(United States) NY	(United States) CHA	(United States) DAY	(United States) LA1	(United States) LA2	(United States) SEA	(United States) LV	Pts
1	(Finland) Joni Wiman	Olsbergs MSE	5	17	3	4	4	7	2	3	2	2	381
2	(United States) Ken Block	Hoonigan Racing Division	10	11	7	3	1	2	3	2	9	1	376
3	(United States) Scott Speed	Volkswagen Andretti Rallycross	1	1	6	9	5	10	1	6	6	4	344
4	(Brazil) Nelson Piquet Jr.	SH Racing Rallycross	4	3	2	2	3	8	12	9	4	DNS	307
5	(Norway) Sverre Isachsen	Subaru Rally Team USA	6	15	10	8	2	5	10	4	1	5	280
6	(Sweden) Patrik Sandell	Olsbergs MSE	8	6	1	10	13	4	5	7	7	10	246
7	(Canada) Steve Arpin	OMSE2	2	10	4	5	7	12	7	12	11	8	224
8	(United States) Bucky Lasek	Subaru Rally Team USA	13	2	11	12	6	3	11	5	14	3	215
9	(United States) Tanner Foust	Volkswagen Andretti Rallycross	11	18	5	1	8	6	8	13	10	6	209
10	(New Zealand) Rhys Millen	Rhys Millen Racing	7	13	9	7	11	1	4	1	5	13	201
11	(United States) Austin Dyne	Barracuda Racing	9	5	8	6	10	9	9	10	12	12	150
12	(United States) Brian Deegan	Rockstar Energy Drink	3	8			9				3	9	140
13	(New Zealand) Emma Gilmour	Rhys Millen Racing	12	12	12	11	12	11	13	11	13	7	62
14	(United States) Pat Moro	PMR Motorsports		19				13				11	8
	(Australia) Sarah Burgess	BMI Racing						DNS					0
Other competing drivers
	(United Kingdom) Liam Doran	LD Motorsports		4									0
	(United States) Travis Pastrana	Subaru Rally Team USA		7					6	8			0
	(United Kingdom) David Higgins	Subaru Rally Team USA									8		0
	(United States) Ricky Johnson	Olsbergs MSE		9									0
	(Sweden) Anton Marklund	Marklund Motorsport		14									0
	(Finland) Toomas Heikkinen	Marklund Motorsport		16									0

Colour	Result
Gold	Winner
Silver	2nd place
Bronze	3rd place
Green	Finished, in points
Blue	Finished, no points
Blue	Not classified (NC)
Purple	Did not finish (Ret)
Black	Disqualified (DSQ)
White	Did not start (DNS)
White	Withdrew (WD)
White	Race cancelled (C)
Blank	Did not participate
Blank	Excluded (EX)

==== GRC Lites ====
Pos.	Driver	No.	Team	(United States) DC	(United States) NY	(United States) CHA	(United States) DAY	(United States) LA1	(United States) LA2	(United States) SEA	(United States) LV	Pts.
1	(United States) Mitchell deJong	24	Olsbergs MSE	1	2	1	1	2	1	1	1	489
2	(Sweden) Kevin Eriksson	96	Olsbergs MSE	2	1	2		1	2		8	331
3	(Colombia) Alejandro Fernández	126	Olsbergs MSE	6	6	4	2	7	3	3	5	206
4	(United States) Tyler Benson	60	Rhys Millen Racing	8	5	5	3	6	5	4	4	273
5	(United States) Austin Cindric	77	GO PUCK/Nightrain C4 Motorsports	5		7		5	4	2	3	257
6	(United States) Geoff Sykes	6	DTV Solutions	7	7	6	5	4	7	5		235
7	(Sweden) Oliver Eriksson	16	Olsbergs MSE		4	3					6	110
8	(Brazil) Nelson Piquet Jr.	07	Piquet Sports	3								75
9	(Sweden) Kevin Hansen	81	Hansen Motorsport					3	6			73
10	(Brazil) Atila Abreu	51	Olsbergs MSE	4								72
11	(Norway) Andreas Bakkerud	13	Olsbergs MSE								2	51
12	(Brazil) Pedro Piquet	5	Piquet Sports		3							43
13	(United States) Blake Fuller	79	GO PUCK/Nightrain C4 Motorsports				4					37
14	(United States) Nick Roberts	202	Nick Roberts Global Rally Team								7	22
15	(United States) Colton Herta	98	AD Racing									16
16	(United States) Mark McKenzie	27	Cohesive Front Racing									0
17	(United States) Tanner Whitten	15	DirtFish Motorsports									0

=== Manufacturers' championship ===
Pos	Manufacturer	Pts
1	(United States) Ford	946
2	(Germany) Volkswagen	553
3	(Japan) Subaru	495
4	(South Korea) Hyundai	263
5	(United States) GM	8
Pos	Manufacturer	Pts
