= 2017 Russian Circuit Racing Series =

Motor racing season

The 2017 SMP Russian Circuit Racing Series was the fourth season of the Russian Circuit Racing Series, organized by SMP Racing. It was the third season with TCR class cars, competing alongside the Super 2000 TC2 cars.

Dmitry Bragin became TCR Russia champion for a second year in a row, Mikhail Mityaev won Russian Cup in Super-Production category. Denis Bulatov became Champion of Russia in Touring-Light, and Aidar Nuriev won Russian Cup in National category. Maxim Kornilkov become the winner of National-Junior category. Irek Minnakhmetov became first ever SMP RCRS Trophy winner.

== Teams and drivers ==
All teams and drivers were Russian-registered except Vladislav Seredenko from Ukraine who performs in the National Junior class. Yokohama was the official tyre supplier.

=== Touring / TCR Russian Touring Car Championship ===
Team	Car	No.	Drivers	Class	Rounds
STK TAIF Motorsport	SEAT León TCR	1	Dmitry Bragin	TCR	3–5
STK TAIF Motorsport	Audi RS3 LMS TCR	1	Dmitry Bragin	TCR	1–2, 6–7
STK TAIF Motorsport	Audi RS3 LMS TCR	87	Marat Sharapov	TCR T	All
STK TAIF Motorsport	Audi RS3 LMS TCR	89	Timur Shigabutdinov	TCR T	2–3, 5–7
STK Chingiskhan	Audi RS3 LMS TCR	76	Irek Minnakhmetov	TCR T	All
Lukoil Racing Team	SEAT León TCR	2	Aleksey Dudukalo	TCR	All
Lukoil Racing Team	SEAT León TCR	12	Nikolay Karamyshev	TCR	All
Lukoil Racing +	SEAT León TCR	4	Roman Golikov	TCR	All
Lukoil Racing +	SEAT León TCR	14	Klim Gavrilov	TCR T	All
NEVA Motorsport	SEAT León TCR	5	Pavel Yashin	TCR T	All
NEVA Motorsport	SEAT León TCR	10	Oleg Haruk	TCR T	5–7
B-Tuning PRO Racing Team	SEAT León Supercopa Mk2	10	Oleg Haruk	T	2
Innocenti-AMG Motorsport	SEAT León TCR	7	Denis Grigoriev	TCR T	All
Innocenti-AMG Motorsport	SEAT León TCR	15	Lev Tolkachev	TCR T	1–4, 6–7
Maxim Andrakhanov	SEAT León TCR	9	Maxim Andrakhanov	TCR T	5–7
LADA Sport Rosneft	LADA Vesta TCR	11	Kirill Ladygin	TCR	All
LADA Sport Rosneft	LADA Vesta TCR	19	Vladimir Sheshenin	TCR	All
Anton Badoev	SEAT León TCR	51	Anton Badoev	TCR T	1–2, 4–5
Timerkhan	SEAT León Supercopa Mk2	61	Rais Minnikhanov	T	4
AKHMAT Racing Team	SEAT León TCR	95	Vitaliy Dudin	TCR	All

Key
Teams claimed for team points.
TCR	TCR Russia
T	SMP RCRS Trophy

In the Trophy class, pilots who are not prize-winners of foreign racing series and who are not prize-winners of the Russian Championship participate.

=== Super Production ===
Team	Car	No.	Drivers	Rounds
Demfi LADA SPORT	LADA Granta Cup	17	Vitaly Primak	1–5
Demfi LADA SPORT	LADA Granta Cup	27	Mikhail Grachev	6–7
ALAS; DELPHI RHHCC Racing Team	Honda Civic Type R Mk7	21	Artem Kabakov	All
ALAS; DELPHI RHHCC Racing Team	Honda Civic Type R Mk7	54	Aleksandr Garmash	All
ALAS; DELPHI RHHCC Racing Team	Honda Civic Type R Mk7	55	Vladimir Strelchenko	1–2
ALAS; DELPHI RHHCC Racing Team	Honda Civic Type R Mk8	88	Nikolay Vikhansky	1–5, 7
ALAS; DELPHI RHHCC Racing Team	Honda Civic Type R Mk8	89	Maxim Belotsky	6
LADA Sport Rosneft	LADA Vesta 1.6T	30	Mikhail Mityaev	All
LADA Sport Rosneft	LADA Vesta 1.6T	50	Vladislav Nezvankin	All
Arloid-TPV RUS	LADA Granta Cup	33	Sergei Shalunov	1–4
Arloid-TPV RUS	LADA Granta Cup	63	Maksim Simonov	1–4
Uspenskiy Rally Tecnica; Otkritie	Subaru BRZ	46	Efim Gantmakher	All
Uspenskiy Rally Tecnica; Otkritie	Subaru BRZ	52	Maxim Chernev	All
Aimol NEVA Motorsport	Honda Civic Type R Mk7	51	Sergei Golubev	1–6
Aimol NEVA Motorsport	Honda Civic Type R Mk8	77	Dmitry Dobrovolsky	All
Aleksandr Marushko	LADA Granta Cup	58	Aleksandr Marushko	All

Key
Teams claimed for team points.

=== Touring Light ===
Team	Car	No.	Drivers	Rounds
Suvar Motorsport	Renault Twingo Sport	4	Ildar Rakhmatullin	All
Suvar Motorsport	Renault Twingo Sport	44	Ilsur Akhmetvaleev	All
SMP Racing Russia; SMP Power	Volkswagen Polo R2 Mk5	7	Aleksey Basov	All
SMP Racing Russia; SMP Power	Volkswagen Polo R2 Mk5	10	Vladimir Atoev	All
SMP Racing Russia; SMP Power	Volkswagen Polo R2 Mk5	11	Anton Ladygin	7
SMP Racing Russia; SMP Power	Volkswagen Polo R2 Mk5	22	Denis Bulatov	All
SMP Racing Russia; SMP Power	Volkswagen Polo R2 Mk5	37	Nerses Isaakyan	5–6
SMP Racing Russia; SMP Power	Volkswagen Polo R2 Mk5	47	Matevos Isaakyan	4
SMP Racing Russia; SMP Power	Volkswagen Polo R2 Mk5	72	Nikita Zlobin	1–2
Rally Academy	Volkswagen Polo R2 Mk5	13	Igor Samsonov	All
Podmoskovie Motorsport	Volkswagen Polo R2 Mk5	17	Vladimir Cherevan	All
Podmoskovie Motorsport	Ford Fiesta Mk5	43	Andrey Maslennikov	All
TEAM 80	Hyundai Solaris RB	19	Rodion Shushakov	15
Carville Racing	Peugeot 208 GTI	27	Andrey Radoshnov	All
Carville Racing	Peugeot 208 GTI	91	Grigory Burlutskiy	All
LTA Rally	Peugeot 208 GTI	33	Artur Muradyan	7
LTA Rally	Kia Rio R2B	97	Aleksandr Malinin	1–2
LTA Rally	Opel Adam	97	Aleksandr Malinin	3, 5–7
NEFIS Racing Division	Peugeot 208 GTI	77	Timur Boguslavskiy	All

Key
Teams claimed for team points.

=== National ===
Team	Car	No.	Drivers	Rounds
Redmond Drive	Kia Rio	3	Igor Lvov	All
Sergey Schegolev	Lada Kalina NFR R1	4	Sergey Schegolev	2–5
Aleksandr Dudarev	Kia Rio	55	Aleksandr Dudarev	4
Rally Academy	Volkswagen Polo	55	Aleksandr Dudarev	1–3, 5–6
Rally Academy	Volkswagen Polo	5	Gleb Kuznetsov	All
Rally Academy	Volkswagen Polo	7	Tatiana Dobrynina	1–5
Rally Academy	Volkswagen Polo	71	Ivan Kostukov	1–4, 6–7
B-Tuning Pro Racing Team	Volkswagen Polo	33	Artur Muradyan	1–2, 6
ALAS; DELPHI RHHCC Racing Team	Volkswagen Polo	7	Tatiana Dobrynina	6–7
ALAS; DELPHI RHHCC Racing Team	Volkswagen Polo	99	Ivan Demuh	1–3, 5
ALAS; DELPHI RHHCC Racing Team	Volkswagen Polo	88	Maxim Gordushkin	7
ALAS; DELPHI RHHCC Racing Team	Lada Kalina NFR	21	Egor Kiryakov	All
Grigory Zavyalov	Kia Rio	8	Grigory Zavyalov	4
LADA Sport	Lada Kalina NFR R1	10	Andrey Petukhov	All
LADA Sport Rosneft	Lada Kalina NFR R1	19	Vladislav Ustiugov	1–4
LADA Sport Rosneft	Lada Kalina NFR R1	20	Egor Sanin	All
LADA Sport Rosneft	Lada Kalina NFR R1	51	Vsevolod Gagen	5–7
SK V-Power	Lada Kalina NFR	11	Rafael Fattakhov	All
SK V-Power	Lada Kalina NFR	34	Andrey Maslennikov	5–7
SK V-Power	Lada Kalina NFR	73	Anton Ladygin	1–4
AKHMAT Racing Team	Volkswagen Polo	12	Magomed Daghiev	3–6
AKHMAT Racing Team	Volkswagen Polo	64	Halid Alviev	1
AKHMAT Racing Team	Volkswagen Polo	95	Islam Barzankaev	1–2
AKHMAT Racing Team	Volkswagen Polo	32	Vitaly Dudin	1–2
AKHMAT Racing Team	Kia Rio	32	Vitaly Dudin	6
AKHMAT Racing Team	Kia Rio	85	Roman Agoshkov	1–5, 7
Roman Shusharin	Kia Rio	15	Roman Shusharin	All
Yury Zhironkin	Lada Kalina	16	Yury Zhironkin	3, 5–6
Goltsova Racing	Lada Kalina	17	Kirill Plekhov	1–5, 7
Zenit Motorsport	Ford Fiesta	22	Sergey Koronatov	5, 7
Zorro Racing Team	Kia Rio	24	Vasily Krichevsky	1–3
Dmitry Zabolonsky	Lada Kalina	26	Dmitry Zabolonsky	3
AG Team	Kia Rio	28	Anvar Tutaev	4, 6–7
Andrey Emelin	Kia Rio	35	Andrey Emelin	6
Aliance VIP-Auto	Kia Rio	36	Eugeny Ushmaev	4
UMMC Motorsport	Lada Kalina	37	Natalia Goltsova	All
UMMC Motorsport	Lada Kalina	72	Vitaly Larionov	All
IzhAutoSport	Lada Kalina	43	Roman Kozyavin	1–4, 6–7
IzhAutoSport	Lada Kalina	49	Ildar Fattakhov	3–4
Ruslan Nafikov	Kia Rio	44	Ruslan Nafikov	All
Radik Garifianov	Lada Kalina	45	Radik Garifianov	2
Yulia Strukova	Kia Rio	46	Yulia Strukova	1–6
FEREKS Racing Team	Kia Rio	48	Aydar Nuriev	All
Parus	Lada Kalina	56	Vasily Korablev	1–5, 7
Parus	Lada Kalina	59	Anatoly Korablev	4, 7
Sergey Drebenets	Lada Kalina	57	Sergey Drebenets	3–7
Timerkhan	Kia Rio	61	Rais Minnikhanov	4
Arloid-TPV RUS	Lada Kalina	63	Maxim Simonov	3–4
TEAM80	Hyundai Solaris	74	Rodion Shushakov	6–7
Aleksandr Maslennikov	Ford Fiesta	77	Aleksandr Maslennikov	1
Aleksandr Maslennikov	Kia Rio	77	Aleksandr Maslennikov	3–4
Aleksandr Shuvalov	Lada Kalina	80	Aleksandr Shuvalov	3–4, 7

Key
Teams claimed for team points.

=== National Junior ===
Team	Car	No.	Drivers	Rounds
Rally Academy: AR Junior	Volkswagen Polo Mk5	5	Irina Sidorkova	1, 3–5, 7
Rally Academy: AR Junior	Volkswagen Polo Mk5	7	Anastasia Grishina	3–5, 7
Rally Academy: AR Junior	Volkswagen Polo Mk5	35	Pavel Kuzminov	1, 3–5, 7
B-Tuning Pro Racing Team: Anton Zakharov's Racing Academy	Volkswagen Polo Mk5	9	Aleksey Sakharov	1, 3–5, 7
B-Tuning Pro Racing Team: Anton Zakharov's Racing Academy	Volkswagen Polo Mk5	33	Artem Lyakin	1, 3–5, 7
B-Tuning Pro Racing Team	Volkswagen Polo Mk5	22	Ilya Doschechkin	1, 3–5, 7
B-Tuning Pro Racing Team	Volkswagen Polo Mk5	16	Nikita Aleksandrov	3
Zenit Motorsport	Volkswagen Polo Mk5	16	Nikita Aleksandrov	4
Goltsova Racing	Lada Kalina	8	Efim Bulatov	1, 3–5, 7
Goltsova Racing	Lada Kalina	25	Maxim Kornilkov	1, 3–5, 7
Goltsova Racing	Lada Kalina	77	Virsavia Goltsova	4–5, 7
D. Gavrichenkov	Lada Kalina II	17	Anton Gavrichenkov	1, 3–5
S. Fatkhutdinov	Lada Kalina	18	Rustam Fatkhutdinov	1, 3
S. Fatkhutdinov	Volkswagen Polo Mk5	18	Rustam Fatkhutdinov	4–5, 7
V. Belotsvetova	Lada Kalina	36	Kirill Havronin	4
Arloid-TVP RUS	Lada Kalina	36	Kirill Havronin	3
Arloid-TVP RUS	Lada Kalina	63	Mikhail Simonov	3
M. Simonov	Lada Kalina	63	Mikhail Simonov	4
A. Gusev	Lada Kalina	90	Vladislav Gusev	3-4
AKHMAT Racing Team	Volkswagen Polo Mk5	95	Khasbulat Ansarov	1
AKHMAT Racing Team	Volkswagen Polo Mk5	96	Vladislav Seredenko	1, 3–5, 7
A. Zimin	Lada Kalina	99	Daniil Zimin	3–5, 7

== Calendar and results ==
The 2017 schedule was announced on 12 December 2016, with all events scheduled to be held in Russia.

Rnd.		Circuit	Date	Touring winner	SP winner	TL winner	National winner	Junior winner	Supporting
1	1	Fort Grozny, Grozny	13 May	Kirill Ladygin	Maxim Chernev	Grigory Burlutskiy	Aydar Nuriev	Irina Sidorkova	
1	2	Fort Grozny, Grozny	14 May	Dmitry Bragin	Mikhail Mityaev	Andrey Maslennikov	Gleb Kuznetsov	Maxim Kornilkov	
2	3	Smolensk Ring, Smolensk	27 May	Denis Grigoriev	Mikhail Mityaev	Timur Boguslavskiy	Andrey Petukhov	Not conducted	SMP F4 Championship
2	4	Smolensk Ring, Smolensk	28 May	Dmitry Bragin	Maxim Chernev	Ildar Rakhmatullin	Aydar Nuriev	Not conducted	SMP F4 Championship
3	5	NRING Circuit, Bogorodsk	17 June	Nikolay Karamyshev	Maxim Chernev	Grigory Burlutskiy	Ivan Kostukov	Irina Sidorkova	Legends Russian Series
3	6	NRING Circuit, Bogorodsk	18 June	Dmitry Bragin	Maxim Chernev	Ilsur Akhmetvaleev	Igor Lvov	Vladislav Seredenko	Legends Russian Series
4	7	Kazan Ring, Kazan	1 July	Kirill Ladygin	Artem Kabakov	Vladimir Atoev	Roman Agoshkov	Maxim Kornilkov	
4	8	Kazan Ring, Kazan	2 July	Vladimir Sheshenin	Mikhail Mityaev	Denis Bulatov	Andrey Petukhov	Maxim Kornilkov	
5	9	Smolensk Ring, Smolensk	5 August	Vladimir Sheshenin	Mikhail Mityaev	Andrey Maslennikov	Roman Agoshkov	Maxim Kornilkov	Legends Russian Series
5	10	Smolensk Ring, Smolensk	6 August	Klim Gavrilov	Vitaly Primak	Vladimir Atoev	Egor Sanin	Maxim Kornilkov	Legends Russian Series
6	11	Moscow Raceway, Volokolamsk	19 August	Vitaly Dudin	Maxim Chernev	Ildar Rakhmatullin	Gleb Kuznetsov	Not conducted	SMP F4 Championship
6	12	Moscow Raceway, Volokolamsk	20 August	Dmitry Bragin	Vladislav Nezvankin	Grigory Burlutskiy	Gleb Kuznetsov	Not conducted	SMP F4 Championship
7	13	Kazan Ring, Kazan	23 September	Kirill Ladygin	Dmitry Dobrovolskiy	Denis Bulatov	Roman Agoshkov	Irina Sidorkova	
7	14	Kazan Ring, Kazan	24 September	Dmitry Bragin	Artem Kabakov	Vladimir Atoev	Egor Sanin	Maxim Kornilkov	

== Championship standings ==
Scoring systems

Position	1st	2nd	3rd	4th	5th	6th	7th	8th	9th	10th	11th	12th	13th	14th	15th	PP	FL
Points	25	20	16	13	11	10	9	8	7	6	5	4	3	2	1	**1**	1

=== Touring / TCR Russian Touring Car Championship ===
Pos.	Driver	GRO		SMO		NRG		KAZ		SMO		MSC		KAZ		Pts.
1	Dmitry Bragin	4	1	6	1	7	1	3	6	3	2	**5**	1	8	1	241
2	Vladimir Sheshenin	2	7	Ret	13	2	6	2	1	**1**	11	2	3	3	7	202
3	Aleksey Dudukalo	3	3	4	2	3	8	12	2	4	13†	4	2	15	5	187
4	Nikolay Karamyshev	DSQ	4	3	6	**1**	7	4	8	5	4	3	6	5	3	172
5	Kirill Ladygin	**1**	6	15	Ret	4	4	**1**	DSQ	2	5	15	Ret	**1**	2	171
6	Irek Minnakhmetov	9	10	2	12	9	Ret	5	11	7	3	6	5	2	4	140
7	Klim Gavrilov	6	Ret	**11**	5	6	3	6	3	8	1	8	Ret	4	DSQ	133
8	Vitaly Dudin	5	2	9	14	8	2	DNS	DNS	6	Ret	1	4	6	11†	131
9	Roman Golikov	7	Ret	5	3	5	5	13	4	Ret	6	7	8	11	Ret	106
10	Denis Grigoriev	10	5	1	15	14	12	7	10	Ret	9	9	12	16†	9	90
11	Pavel Yashin	12	11	7	4	11	9	11	5	12	Ret	13	7	13	8	86
12	Marat Sharapov	13	9	14	7	12	11	9	12	9	8	12	9	9	Ret	47
13	Lev Tolkachev	8	12	12	10	10	13	10	9			10	14	7	12†	65
14	Timur Shigabutdinov			10	9	13	10			Ret	7	11	10	10	6	58
15	Anton Badoev	11	8	8	8			8	7	10	Ret					52
16	Maxim Andrakhanov									13	12	14	11	12	10	24
17	Oleg Haruk			13	11					11	10	16	13	14	13	24
18	Rais Minnikhanov							DNS	13†							3
Pos.	Driver	GRO		SMO		NRG		KAZ		SMO		MSC		KAZ		Pts.

Colour	Result
Gold	Winner
Silver	Second place
Bronze	Third place
Green	Points classification
Blue	Non-points classification
Blue	Non-classified finish (NC)
Purple	Retired, not classified (Ret)
Red	Did not qualify (DNQ)
Red	Did not pre-qualify (DNPQ)
Black	Disqualified (DSQ)
White	Did not start (DNS)
White	Withdrew (WD)
White	Race cancelled (C)
Blank	Did not practice (DNP)
Blank	Did not arrive (DNA)
Blank	Excluded (EX)

**Bold** – Pole
Italics – Fastest Lap

† – Drivers did not finish the race, but were classified as they completed over 75% of the race distance.

==== Touring / TCR Russian Touring Car Championship Team's Standing ====
Pos.	Team	GRO		SMO		NRG		KAZ		SMO		MSK		KAZ		Pts.
1	LADA Sport Rosneft	**1**	6	15	13	2	4	**1**	1	**1**	5	2	3	**1**	2	372
1	LADA Sport Rosneft	2	7	Ret	Ret	4	6	2	DSQ	2	11	15	Ret	3	7	372
2	Lukoil Racing Team	3	3	3	2	**1**	7	4	2	4	4	3	2	5	3	350
2	Lukoil Racing Team	DSQ	4	4	6	3	8	12	8	5	13†	4	6	15	5	350
3	STK TAIF Motorsport	4	1	6	1	7	1	3	6	3	2	**5**	1	8	1	315
3	STK TAIF Motorsport	13	9	14	7	12	11	9	12	9	8	12	9	9	Ret	315
4	Lukoil Racing +	6	Ret	5	3	5	3	6	3	8	1	7	8	4	Ret	239
4	Lukoil Racing +	7	Ret	**11**	5	6	5	13	4	Ret	6	8	Ret	11	DSQ	239
5	Innocenti-AMG Motorsport	8	5	1	10	10	12	7	9	Ret	9	9	12	7	9	155
5	Innocenti-AMG Motorsport	10	12	12	15	14	13	10	10			10	14	16†	12†	155
Pos.	Team	GRO		SMO		NRG		KAZ		SMO		MSC		KAZ		Pts.

=== Super Production ===
Pos.	Driver	GRO		SMO		NRG		KAZ		SMO		MSC		KAZ		Pts.
1	Mikhail Mityaev	**13**	1	1	2	3	2	3	1	**1**	4	DSQ	3	Ret	4	221
2	Maxim Chernev	1	12†	**2**	1	1	1	11†	Ret	7	DSQ	**1**	4	3	Ret	207
3	Efim Gantmakher	2	6	3	5	4	6	4	4	4	3	3	2	5	6	194
4	Vladislav Nezvankin	3	2	8	3	7	3	8†	Ret	5	6	7	1	4	5	172
5	Artem Kabakov	12	9	5	7	10	8	**1**	2	8	Ret	2	5	Ret	1	157
6	Dmitry Dobrovolsky	4	3	DNS	8	**2**	4	2	Ret	2	2	DNS	Ret	**1**	2	157
7	Aleksandr Marushko	5	4	11	Ret	8	Ret	5	9	3	8†	4	6	6	3	129
8	Vitaly Primak	8	10	4	10	6	12†	9†	7	6	1					97
9	Nikolay Vikhansky	6	11	6	11	9	9	7†	3	9	6			7	Ret	94
10	Sergei Golubev	10	8	7	9	5	5	6	8	11†	5	DNS	DNS			86
11	Aleksandr Garmash	9	5	9	Ret	Ret	7	Ret	6	10	Ret	6	Ret	DNS	Ret	60
12	Mikhail Grachev											8†	7†	2	Ret	38
13	Maksim Simonov	11	7	10	6	Ret	10	DSQ	Ret							36
14	Sergei Shalunov	7	Ret	Ret	12	DSQ	11†	10†	5							35
15	Vladimir Strelchenko	Ret	DNS	12	4											17
16	Maxim Belotsky											5	Ret			11
Pos.	Driver	GRO		SMO		NRG		KAZ		SMO		MSC		KAZ		Pts.

==== Super Production Team's Standing ====
Pos.	Team	GRO		SMO		NRG		KAZ		SMO		MSC		KAZ		Pts.
1	Uspenskiy Rally Tecnica; Otkritie	1	6	**2**	1	1	1	4	4	4	3	**1**	2	3	6	401
1	Uspenskiy Rally Tecnica; Otkritie	2	12†	3	5	4	6	11†	Ret	7	DSQ	3	4	5	Ret	401
2	LADA Sport Rosneft	3	1	1	2	3	2	3	1	**1**	4	7	1	4	4	393
2	LADA Sport Rosneft	**13**	2	8	3	7	3	8†	Ret	5	6	DSQ	3	Ret	5	393
3	Aimol NEVA Motorsport	4	3	7	8	**2**	4	2	8	2	2	6	Ret	**1**	2	273
3	Aimol NEVA Motorsport	10	8	DNS	9	5	5	6	Ret	11†	5	DNS	Ret			273
4	Demfi LADA SPORT	5	4	4	10	6	12†	5	7	3	1	4	6	2	3	264
4	Demfi LADA SPORT	8	10	11	Ret	8	Ret	9†	9	6	8†	8†	7†	6	Ret	264
5	ALAS; DELPHI RHHCC Racing Team	12	9	5	4	10	7	**1**	2	8	6	2	5	Ret	1	235
5	ALAS; DELPHI RHHCC Racing Team	Ret	DNS	12	7	Ret	8	7†	3	9	Ret	5	Ret	DNS	Ret	235
6	Arloid-TPV RUS	7	7	10	6	Ret	10	10†	5							71
6	Arloid-TPV RUS	11	Ret	Ret	12	DSQ	11†	DSQ	Ret							71
Pos.	Team	GRO		SMO		NRG		KAZ		SMO		MSC		KAZ		Pts.

=== Touring-Light ===
Pos.	Driver	GRO		SMO		NRG		KAZ		SMO		MSC		KAZ		Pts.
1	Denis Bulatov	5	2	7	DNS	2	5	**12**	1	4	Ret	4	2	1	4	189
2	Andrey Maslennikov	6	1	Ret	5	13†	4	3	5	1	7	3	3	8	2	184
3	Ildar Rakhmatullin	4	5	3	1	10	DSQ	8	10	3	6	1	5	3	9	171
4	Grigory Burlutskiy	**1**	8	DSQ	6	**1**	8	4	12	Ret	3	**5**	1	12	6	164
5	Timur Boguslavskiy	2	6	1	9	4	3	7	6	2	11	11	11	**Ret**	10	153
6	Andrey Radoshnov	3	4	5	8	5	2	9	8	8	4	10	9	4	11	146
7	Vladimir Atoev	DSQ	7	**Ret**	7	3	Ret	1	Ret	Ret	1	2	6	Ret	1	142
8	Vladimir Cherevan	9	12	2	10	9	6	6	3	6	8	6	4	7	7	139
9	Ilsur Akhmetvaleev	8	3	6	2	7	1	10	9	DSQ	2	Ret	13	9	Ret	133
10	Aleksey Basov	Ret	Ret	4	4	12	Ret	2	2	DNS	5	7	7	2	Ret	120
11	Igor Samsonov	7	9	9	3	6	Ret	13†	7	5	10	8	12	10	3	112
12	Aleksandr Malinin	Ret	11	8	Ret	11	7			7	12	9	10	6	8	71
13	Rodion Shushakov	Ret	DSQ	10	Ret	8	Ret	11	11	Ret	9					31
14	Matevos Isaakyan							5	4							24
15	Anton Ladygin													5	5	22
16	Nerses Isaakyan									9	Ret	Ret	8			15
17	Nikita Zlobin	10	10	DNS	DNS											12
18	Artur Muradyan													11	12	9
Pos.	Driver	GRO		SMO		NRG		KAZ		SMO		MSC		KAZ		Pts.

==== Touring-Light Team's Standing ====
Pos.	Team	GRO		SMO		NRG		KAZ		SMO		MSC		KAZ		Pts.
1	Podmoskovie Motorsport	6	1	2	5	9	4	3	3	1	7	3	3	7	2	323
1	Podmoskovie Motorsport	9	12	Ret	10	13†	6	6	5	6	8	6	4	8	7	323
2	Carville Racing	**1**	4	5	6	**1**	2	4	8	8	3	**5**	1	4	6	310
2	Carville Racing	3	8	DSQ	8	5	8	9	12	Ret	4	10	9	12	11	310
3	SMP Racing Russia	5	2	**4**	4	2	5	2	1	4	5	4	2	1	4	310
3	SMP Racing Russia	Ret	Ret	Ret	7	12	Ret	**12**	2	DNS	Ret	7	7	2	Ret	310
4	Suvar Motorsport	4	3	3	1	7	1	8	9	3	2	1	5	3	9	304
4	Suvar Motorsport	8	5	6	2	10	DSQ	10	10	DSQ	6	Ret	13	9	Ret	304
5	NEFIS Racing Division	2	6	1	9	4	3	7	6	2	11	9	10	6	8	235
5	NEFIS Racing Division	Ret	11	8	Ret	11	7	11	11	7	12	11	11	**Ret**	10	235
6	SMP Power	10	7	7	DNS	3	Ret	1	4	9	1	2	6	5	1	224
6	SMP Power	DSQ	10	DNS	DNS	6	Ret	5	Ret	Ret	Ret	Ret	8	Ret	5	224
Pos.	Team	GRO		SMO		NRG		KAZ		SMO		MSC		KAZ		Pts.

=== National ===
Pos.	Driver	GRO		SMO		NRG		KAZ		SMO		MSC		KAZ		Pts.
1	Aydar Nuriev	1	2	3	1	5	2	7	3	2	5	Ret	8	**2**	16	201
2	Gleb Kuznetsov	6	1	2	11	**24**†	14	4	4	3	4	**1**	1	8	2	200
3	Egor Sanin	2	8	16	6	3	6	5	2	7	1	6	4	16	1	177
4	Andrey Petukhov	19	DSQ	**1**	3	9	5	2	1	**4**	3	4	5	6	Ret	172
5	Roman Agoshkov	4	5	15	19	4	3	**1**	10	1	Ret			1	Ret	138
6	Ivan Kostukov	11	13	DNQ	DNQ	1	4	13	6			2	3	9	Ret	103
7	Aleksandr Dudarev	5	7	10	2	13	11	6	Ret	Ret	8	3	7			97
8	Rafael Fattakhov	17	6	5	Ret	2	8	11	11	10	9	Ret	13	5	Ret	86
9	Andrey Maslennikov									5	6	5	2	4	3	81
10	Vasily Korablev	8	Ret	6	Ret	8	9	3	Ret	9	Ret			7	Ret	66
11	Ruslan Nafikov	3	3	11	Ret	10	15	Ret	20†	15	Ret	Ret	14	3	Ret	63
12	Vitaly Larionov	**Ret**	Ret	9	8	12	12	16	DNS	8	7	8	20	10	12	59
13	Igor Lvov	7	9	Ret	DSQ	7	1	17	21†	Ret	11	18	16	Ret	15	57
14	Yulia Strukova	Ret	12	12	7	11	10	15	Ret	12	12	12	12	Ret	6	55
15	Vsevolod Gagen									6	2	7	19†	Ret	5	50
16	Vladislav Ustiugov	10	10	8	5	Ret	7	9	18							47
17	Anton Ladygin	DSQ	Ret	4	4	DNS	13	10	7							45
18	Natalia Goltsova	12	11	25	9	DSQ	16	12	Ret	21	Ret	10	9	Ret	9	40
19	Vitaly Dudin	9	4	Ret	Ret							9	6			37
20	Magomed Daghiev					14	17	14	8	11	10	21	9			28
21	Roman Shusharin	16	16	14	12	Ret	DNS	21	14	Ret	14	11	17	Ret	7	24
22	Anvar Tutaev							20	22†			Ret	8	Ret	4	22
23	Roman Kozyavin					DSQ	18	8	5							19
24	Vasily Krichevsky	21	Ret	7	DSQ	6	24†									19
25	Ivan Demuh	13	14	13	10	23†	Ret			16	13					17
26	Egor Kiryakov	Ret	18	19	16	DSQ	19	Ret	17	18	15	20	Ret	11	8	14
27	Eugeny Ushmaev							18	9							7
28	Sergey Drebenets					16	21							15	10	7
29	Sergei Koronatov									19	Ret			14	11	7
30	Ildar Fattakhov	15	Ret	18	18	25†	23	DSQ	DNS			19	DSQ	12	14	7
31	Yury Zhironkin					19	Ret			13	16†	14	Ret			5
32	Aleksandr Maslennikov	DSQ	Ret			DNS	Ret	19	12							4
33	Tatiana Dobrynina	18	17	21	17	21	22	24	15	17	Ret	16	21†	13	Ret	4
34	Maksim Simonov					15	Ret	23	13							4
35	Artur Muradyan	Ret	Ret	20	13							17	18			3
36	Aleksandr Shuvalov					20	DSQ	27	Ret					DSQ	13	3
37	Rodion Shushakov											13	Ret	DNS	Ret	3
38	Kirill Plekhov	Ret	Ret	17	Ret	17	DNS	Ret	Ret	14	17†			Ret	DNS	2
39	Sergey Schegolev			23	14	22	Ret	22	Ret	20	DSQ					2
40	Halid Alviev	14	Ret													2
41	Andrey Emelin											15	15			2
42	Islam Barzankaev	20	15	22	20											1
43	Radik Garifianov			24	15											1
44	Rais Minnikhanov							DNS	16							0
45	Anatoly Korablev							26	DNS					17	17	0
46	Dmitry Zabolonsky					18	20									0
47	Grigory Zavyalov							25	19							0
-	Maxim Gordyushkin													Ret	DNS	-
Pos.	Driver	GRO		SMO		NRG		KAZ		SMO		MSC		KAZ		Pts.

==== Touring-Light Team's Standing ====
Pos.	Team	GRO		SMO		NRG		KAZ		SMO		MSC		KAZ		Pts.
1	Rally Academy	6	1	2	11	1	4	4	4	3	4	**1**	1	8	2	311
1	Rally Academy	11	13	DNQ	DNQ	**24**†	14	13	6	Ret	8	2	3	9	Ret	311
2	LADA Sport Rosneft	2	8	8	5	3	6	5	2	6	1	6	4	16	1	274
2	LADA Sport Rosneft	10	10	16	6	Ret	7	9	18	7	2	7	19†	Ret	5	274
3	AKHMAT Racing Team	4	4	15	19	4	3	**1**	8	1	10	9	6	1	6	213
3	AKHMAT Racing Team	9	5	Ret	Ret	14	17	14	10	11	Ret	21	9	Ret	Ret	213
4	SK V-Power	17	6	4	4	2	8	10	7	5	6	5	2	4	3	212
4	SK V-Power	DSQ	Ret	5	Ret	DNS	13	11	11	9	10	Ret	13	5	Ret	212
5	UMMC Motorsport	12	11	9	8	12	12	12	Ret	8	7	8	9	10	9	99
5	UMMC Motorsport	**Ret**	Ret	25	9	DSQ	16	16	DNS	21	Ret	10	20	Ret	12	99
6	Redmond Drive	7	9	Ret	DSQ	7	1	17	21†	Ret	11	18	16	Ret	15	57
7	ALAS; DELPHI RHHCC Racing Team	13	14	13	10	23†	19	Ret	17	16	13	16	21†	11	8	34
7	ALAS; DELPHI RHHCC Racing Team	Ret	18	19	16	DSQ	Ret			18	15	20	Ret	13	Ret	34
8	Parus							3	Ret					7	17	26
8	Parus							26	DNS					17	Ret	26
9	IzhAutoSport					25†	18	8	5							19
9	IzhAutoSport					DSQ	23	DSQ	DNS							19
10	B-Tuning Pro Racing Team	Ret	Ret	20	13											3
Pos.	Team	GRO		SMO		NRG		KAZ		SMO		MSC		KAZ		Pts.

=== National-Junior ===
Pos.	Driver	GRO		SMO	NRG		KAZ		SMO		MSC	KAZ		Pts.
1	Maxim Kornilkov	**Ret**	1		6	10	**1**	1	**1**	1		7	1	183
2	Irina Sidorkova	1	3		1	8	6	4	2	2		**1**	10	171
3	Vladislav Seredenko	3	2		4	1	2	3	8	10		Ret	6	135
4	Artem Lyakin	2	11		9	2	8	9	5	4		3	5	119
5	Rustam Fatkhutdinov	5	5		3	Ret	5	2	3	3		Ret	3	118
6	Pavel Kuzminov	8	10		13	5	7	6	6	7		8	2	94
7	Aleksey Sakharov	Ret	8		Ret	6	12	8	4	5		2	7	83
8	Ilya Doschechkin	7	4		11	Ret	3	7	DNS	11		4	8	79
9	Efim Bulatov	6	9		8	12	13	5	7	9		9	9	73
10	Anton Gavrichenkov	8	6		10	11	4	Ret	9	6				58
11	Nikita Aleksandrov				2	3	9	10						49
12	Mikhail Simonov				12	4						10	4	36
13	Anastasia Grishina				DNQ	DNQ	14	Ret	10	8		5	11	32
14	Vladislav Gusev				5	7	10	Ret						26
15	Virsavia Goltsova						16†	13	11	12		6	13	25
16	Kirill Havronin				7	9	11	12						25
17	Khasbulat Ansarov	4	7											22
18	Daniil Zimin				DNQ	13	15	11	DSQ	Ret		DNS	12	13
Pos.	Driver	GRO		SMO	NRG		KAZ		SMO		MSC	KAZ		Pts.
