= Sosnová =

Sosnová may refer to places in the Czech Republic:

- Sosnová (Česká Lípa District), a municipality and village in the Liberec Region
- Sosnová (Opava District), a municipality and village in the Moravian-Silesian Region
