= Sverre Isachsen =

Norwegian rallycross driver (born 1970)

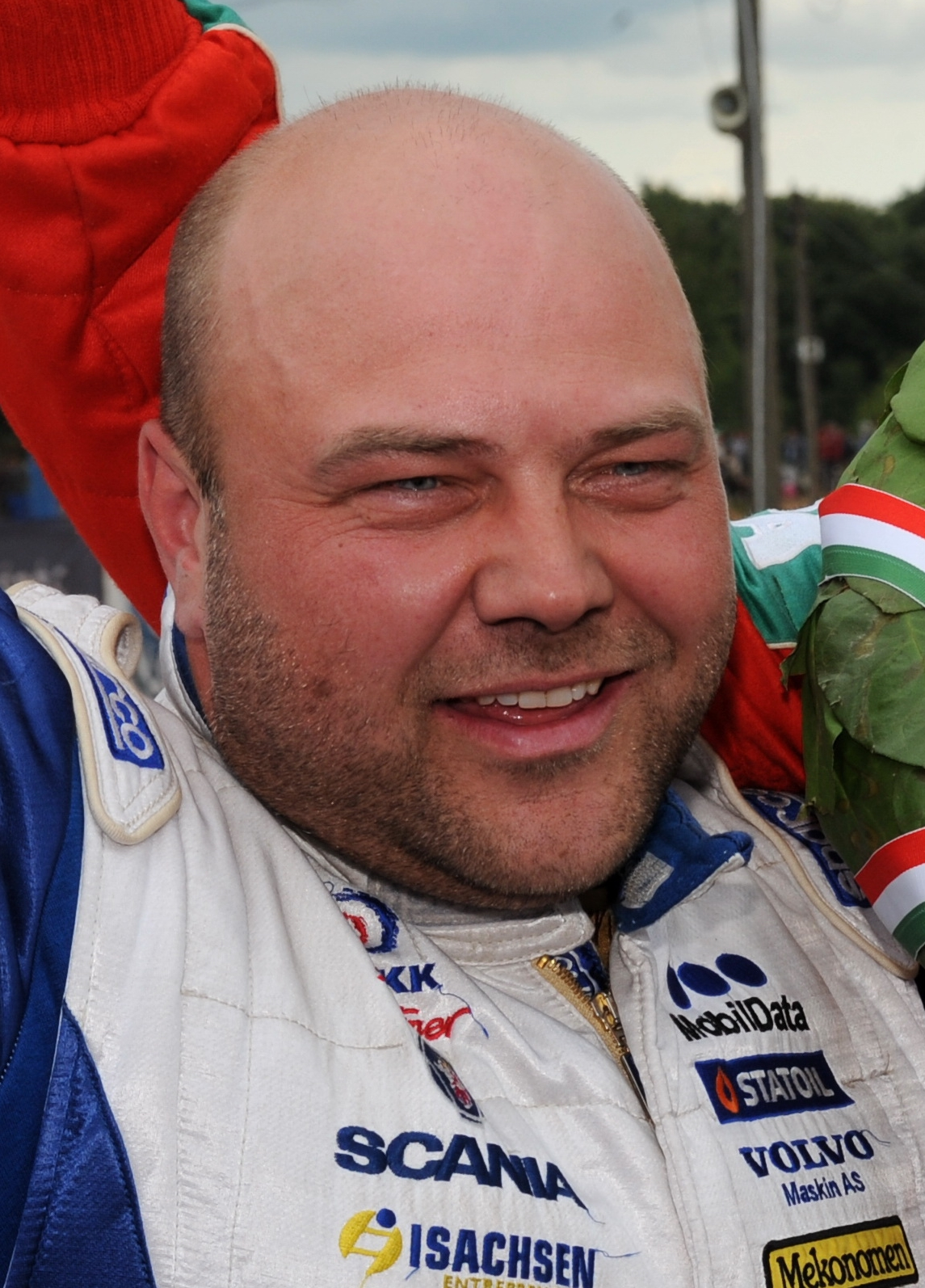
- Isachsen in 2009
- Nationality: Norwegian
- Born: 11 November 1970 (age 55)

Global Rallycross career
- Debut season: 2012
- Current team: Subaru Rally Team USA
- Car number: 11
- Starts: 38
- Wins: 1
- Podiums: 5
- Best finish: 5th in 2014
- Finished last season: 11th

FIA ERX Supercar Championship
- Years active: 2011
- Starts: 10
- Championships: 1 (2011)
- Wins: 5
- Podiums: 6

FIA ERX Division 1 Championship
- Years active: 2002–2010
- Starts: 85
- Championships: 2 (2009, 2010)
- Wins: 18
- Podiums: 34

Sverre Isachsen (born 11 November 1970) is a Norwegian rallycross driver.

== Career ==
Isachsen started with motorsports in 1989 and became the Norwegian Rallycross Champion in 1999 and 2000. In 2009, 2010 and 2011, he became the European Rallycross Champion with a Ford Focus. He was also awarded the "Driver of the Year" title by the Norwegian Autosport Federation in 2010 and 2011.

In 2012, Isachen signed a three-year deal to drive the Global RallyCross Championship for the Subaru Puma Rallycross Team, together with Dave Mirra and Bucky Lasek. He previously drove the 2016 Subaru WRX STI GRC Car for Subaru. After the 2016 season, he and his teammate Bucky Lasek left Subaru to pursue in other areas. Both of the drivers' replacements are Chris Atkinson and Patrick Sandell. His exploits in the Global RallyCross Championship have earned him the nickname of “The Viking Warrior” in the U.S.

Isachen lives in Hokksund, Norway.

== Racing record ==
=== Complete FIA European Rallycross Championship results ===
==== Division 1 ====
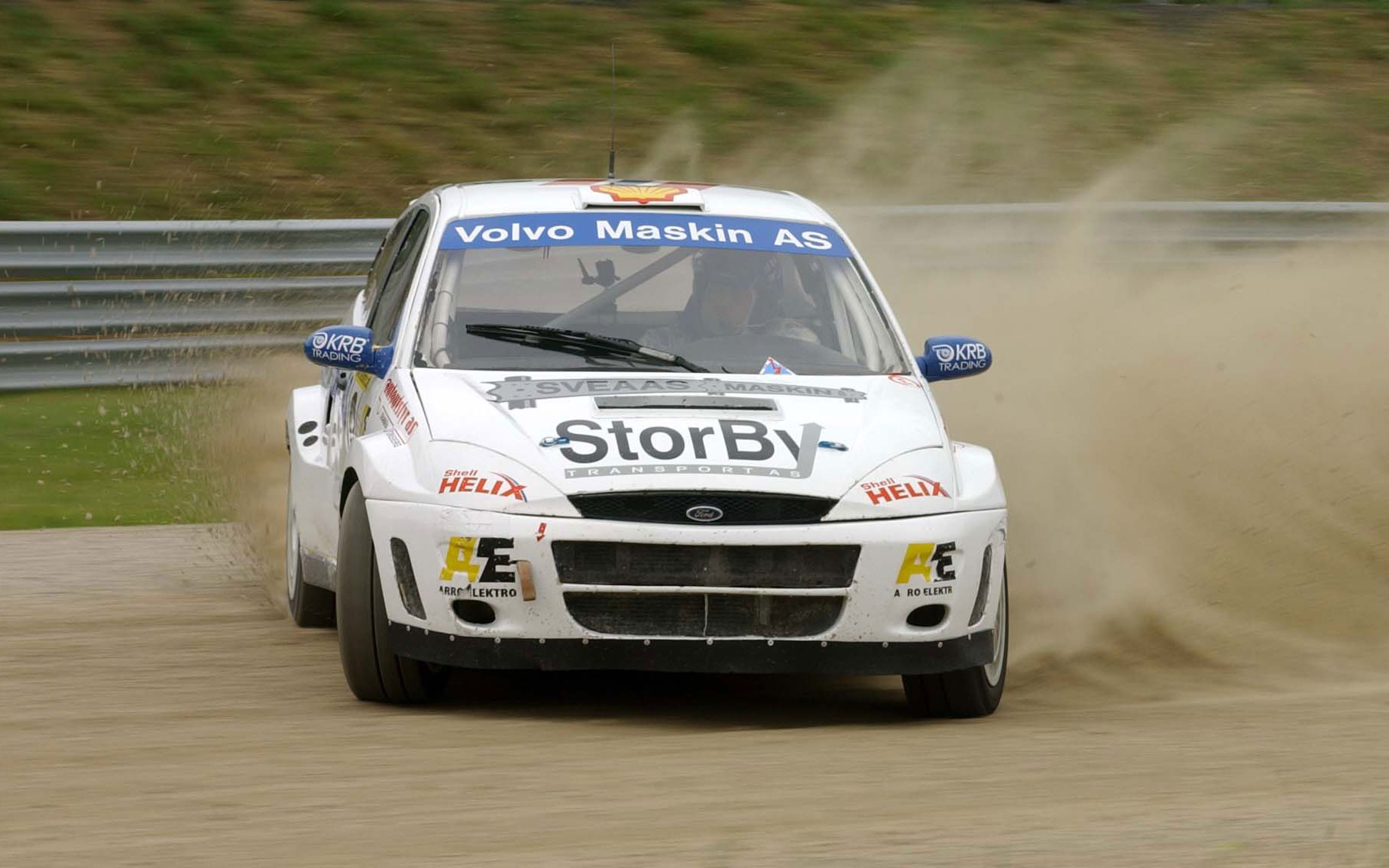
Sverre Isachsen and his Ford Focus Mk1 T16 4x4 pictured in 2004

Year	Entrant	Car	1	2	3	4	5	6	7	8	9	10	11	ERX	Points
2002	Sverre Isachsen	Ford Focus RS WRC	POR	FRA	AUT	CZE	SWE; 6	BEL; 10	NED; 5	NOR; 9	POL	GER; 2		8th	55
2003	Sverre Isachsen	Ford Focus T16	POR; 11	FRA	AUT; 4	CZE; 3	SWE; 9	BEL; 9	NED; 9	NOR; 3	POL	GER; 11		8th	79
2004	Sverre Isachsen	Ford Focus T16	POR; 4	FRA; 5	CZE; 11	AUT (NC)	NOR; 10	SWE; 1	BEL; 5	NED; 6	POL (15)	GER; 5		7th	93
2005	Sverre Isachsen	Ford Focus T16	FRA; 2	POR; 4	AUT; 3	CZE (8)	NOR; 1	SWE (14)	BEL; 8	NED; 1	POL; 7	GER; 1		3rd	124
2006	Sverre Isachsen	Ford Focus T16	POR; 15	FRA (16)	CZE; 1	AUT; 5	SWE; 1	HUN; 1	BEL; 9	NED (10)	NOR; 9	POL; 2	GER; 1	4th	127
2007	Sverre Isachsen	Ford Focus T16	POR (6)	FRA; 5	HUN; 3	AUT; 5	SWE; 2	NOR; 4	BEL; 2	NED; 2	POL; 9	CZE (NC)		4th	111
2008	Sverre Isachsen	Ford Focus ST T16	POR; 4	FRA; 8	HUN; 6	AUT; 6	NOR; 3	SWE (NC)	BEL; 1	NED; 6	CZE; 4	POL; 1	GER (10)	4th	123
2009	Sverre Isachsen	Ford Focus ST T16	GBR; 2	POR; 2	FRA; 2	HUN; 2	AUT (6)	SWE (NC)	BEL; 1	GER; 1	POL; 4	CZE; 1		1st	141
2010	Sverre Isachsen	Ford Focus ST T16	POR (2)	FRA; 2	GBR; 1	HUN; 1	SWE; 1	FIN (5)	BEL; 5	GER; 1	POL; 5	CZE; 1		1st	141

==== Supercar ====
Year	Entrant	Car	1	2	3	4	5	6	7	8	9	10	ERX	Points
2011	Sverre Isachsen	Ford Focus T16	GBR; 1	POR; 7	FRA (12)	NOR; 2	SWE; 4	BEL (13)	NED; 1	AUT; 1	POL; 1	CZE; 1	1st	140

=== Complete FIA World Rallycross Championship results ===
==== Supercar ====
Year	Entrant	Car	1	2	3	4	5	6	7	8	9	10	11	12	WRX	Points
2014	Subaru Rally Team USA	Subaru Impreza WRX STI	POR	GBR	NOR	FIN	SWE	BEL	CAN; 13	FRA	GER	ITA	TUR	ARG	42nd	7

=== Complete Global RallyCross Championship results ===
==== Supercar ====
Year	Entrant	Car	1	2	3	4	5	6	7	8	9	10	11	12	GRC	Points
2012	Subaru Puma Rallycross Team USA	Subaru Impreza WRX STI	CHA; 12	TEX; 10	LA; 10	LOU; 13	LV; 3	LVC; 12							9th	40
2013	Subaru Puma Rallycross Team USA	Subaru Impreza WRX STI	BRA	MUN1; 17	MUN2; 8	LOU; 6	BRI; 4	IRW; 3	ATL; 3	CHA; 8	LV; 5				7th	86
2014	Subaru Rally Team USA	Subaru Impreza WRX STI	BAR; 6	AUS; 15	DC; 10	NY; 8	CHA; 2	DAY; 5	LA1; 10	LA2; 4	SEA; 1	LV; 5			5th	280
2015	Subaru Rally Team USA	Subaru WRX STI	FTA; 9	DAY1; 10	DAY2; 11	MCAS; 6	DET1; 12	DET2; 12	DC	LA1; 4	LA2; 13	BAR1; 7	BAR2; 12	LV; 14	11th	136
2016	Subaru Rally Team USA	Subaru WRX STI	PHO1	PHO2	DAL	DAY1	DAY2	MCAS1; 11	MCAS2^{†}	DC; 11	AC; 9	SEA	LA1	LA2	17th	19

^{†}Race cancelled.

Sporting positions
Preceded by Kenneth Hansen	European Rallycross Division 1 Champion; 2009-2010	Succeeded by None
Preceded by None	European Rallycross Supercar Champion; 2011	Succeeded by Timur Timerzyanov
