= Krzysztof Skorupski =

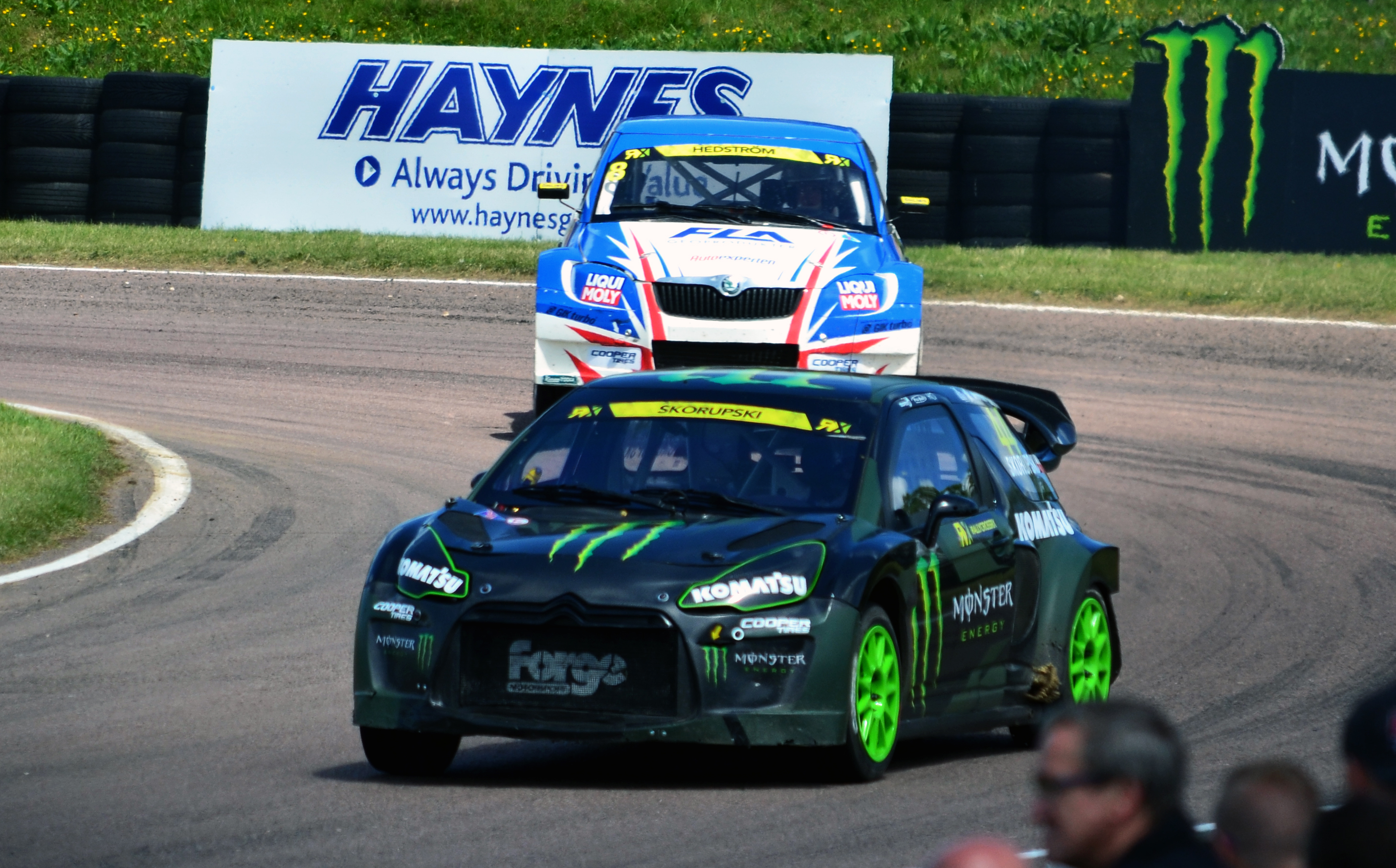
- Skorupski at the 2014 World RX of Great Britain
- Nationality: Polish
- Born: 25 April 1989 (age 37) Warsaw, Poland

FIA World Rallycross Championship career
- Years active: 2014
- Car number: 44
- Former teams: Monster Energy World RX
- Starts: 4
- Wins: 0
- Podiums: 0
- Best finish: 24th in 2014

Krzysztof Skorupski (born 25 April 1989) is a professional rallycross driver from Warsaw in Poland. He raced in the opening four rounds of the World Rallycross championship with Monster Energy World RX following victory in the Polish Super1600 category.

== Results ==
=== Complete FIA World Rallycross Championship results ===
==== Supercar ====
Year	Entrant	Car	1	2	3	4	5	6	7	8	9	10	11	12	WRX	Points
2014	Monster Energy World RX	Citroën DS3	PRT; 18	GBR; 27	NOR; 18	FIN; 4	SWE	BEL	CAN	FRA	GER	ITA	TUR	ARG	24th	19
