= Ildar Rakhmatullin =

Russian racing driver (born 1986)

- Nationality: Russian
- Born: Ildar Ilhamovich Rakhmatullin; 6 March 1986 (age 40) Kazan, Tatar ASSR, Russian SFSR, Soviet Union

Russian Circuit Racing Series career
- Debut season: 2014
- Wins: 4
- Best finish: 8th in 2014

FIA ERX Super1600 Championship
- Years active: 2011–2013
- Former teams: Set Promotion; SK Suvar Motorsport
- Starts: 25
- Wins: 2
- Podiums: 7
- Best finish: 2nd in 2013

FIA ERX Division 1A Championship
- Years active: 2009–2010
- Former teams: SK Suvar Motorsport
- Starts: 19
- Wins: 1
- Podiums: 10
- Best finish: 2nd in 2010

Previous series
- 2015 2008 2007 1996-06: TCR International Series; Russian Rallycross Championship; Russian Ice Racing Championship; Karting

Championship titles
- 2007: Russian Ice Racing Championship

Ildar Ilhamovich Rakhmatullin (born 6 March 1986) is a Russian racing driver currently competing in the Russian Circuit Racing Series. He previously competed in the TCR International Series and FIA European Rallycross Championship.

== Racing career ==
Rakhmatullin began his career in 1996 in karting. In 2007 he switched to the Russian Ice Racing Championship, and he won the championship that year. In 2008 he switched to the Russian Rallycross Championship, finishing the season 4th in the championship standings. He switched to the FIA European Rallycross Championship in 2009, he raced in the championship up until 2013, finishing second in the championship standings in 2010 and 2013. In June 2015, it was announced that Rakhmatullin would make his TCR International Series debut with WestCoast Racing driving a Honda Civic TCR.

== Racing record ==
=== Complete FIA European Rallycross Championship ===
==== Division 1A ====
Year	Entrant	Car	1	2	3	4	5	6	7	8	9	10	ERX	Points
2009	SK Suvar Motorsport	Renault Clio II	GBR	POR; 11	FRA; 9	HUN; 11	AUT; 3	SWE (10)	BEL; 2	GER; 4	POL; 4	CZE; 2	4th	95
2010	SK Suvar Motorsport	Renault Clio II	POR; 3	FRA; 3	GBR; 3	HUN (5)	SWE; 2	FIN; 1	BEL (7)	GER; 3	POL; 7	CZE; 3	2nd	122

==== Super1600 ====
Year	Entrant	Car	1	2	3	4	5	6	7	8	9	10	ERX	Points
2011	SK Suvar Motorsport	Renault Twingo II	GBR; 11	POR; 8	FRA; 19	NOR; 1	SWE; 11	BEL; 15	NED; 5	AUT; 15	POL	CZE	10th	57
2012	SK Suvar Motorsport	Renault Clio II	GBR	FRA; 4	AUT; 3	HUN; 5	NOR; 1	SWE; 5	BEL; 5	NED; 7	FIN; 9	GER	5th	102
2013	SET Promotion	Renault Twingo II	GBR; 5	POR; 5	HUN; 2	FIN; 2	NOR; 2	SWE; 5	FRA; 7	AUT; 3	GER; 6		2nd	187

=== Complete TCR International Series results ===
(key) (Races in bold indicate pole position) (Races in italics indicate fastest lap)

Year	Team	Car	1	2	3	4	5	6	7	8	9	10	11	12	13	14	15	16	17	18	19	20	21	22	DC	Points
2015	WestCoast Racing	Honda Civic TCR	MYS; 1	MYS; 2	CHN; 1	CHN; 2	ESP; 1	ESP; 2	POR; 1	POR; 2	ITA; 1	ITA; 2	AUT; 1	AUT; 2	RUS; 1; 12†	RUS; 2; 10	RBR; 1	RBR; 2	SIN; 1	SIN; 2	THA; 1	THA; 2	MAC; 1	MAC; 2	43rd	1
2016	WestCoast Racing	Honda Civic TCR	BHR; 1	BHR; 2	POR; 1	POR; 2	BEL; 1	BEL; 2	ITA; 1	ITA; 2	AUT; 1	AUT; 2	GER; 1	GER; 2	RUS; 1; 11	RUS; 2 Ret	THA; 1	THA; 2	SIN; 1	SIN; 2	MYS; 1	MYS; 2	MAC; 1	MAC; 2	NC	0

^{†} Driver did not finish the race, but was classified as he completed over 75% of the race distance.
