= 2013 Global RallyCross Championship =

The 2013 Global RallyCross Championship was the third season of this championship. The season consisted of nine weekends, three in X Games events (including a doubleheader after an event cancellation). Toomas Heikkinen earned his first series championship after a record-setting streak of five consecutive victories.

== Rules changes ==
A penalty box will be added for this season. In case of a false start, the driver must endure a stop-go penalty in this zone avoiding the need to restart the race. Stop-go penalty can be also given for too aggressive car-to-car contact, such causing a competing driver to spin out by pushing their car.

== Teams and drivers ==
Manufacturer	Constructor Team	Individual Team	No.	Drivers	Rounds	Cars
Chevrolet	(United States) PMR Motorsports	PMR Motorsports	59	(United States) Pat Moro	8–9	Chevrolet Sonic
Citroën	(United Kingdom) LD Motorsport	LD Motorsport	33	(United Kingdom) Liam Doran	1	Citroën DS3
Dodge	(United States) Pastrana Racing	Pastrana Racing	99	(United States) Bryce Menzies	1–6, 8–9	Dodge Dart
Dodge	(United States) Pastrana Racing	Pastrana Racing	99	(Norway) Henning Solberg	7	Dodge Dart
Dodge	(United States) Pastrana Racing	Pastrana Racing	199	(United States) Travis Pastrana	1, 4, 6, 8–9	Dodge Dart
Dodge	(United States) Pastrana Racing	Pastrana Racing	199	(Russia) Timur Timerzyanov	2–3, 5, 7	Dodge Dart
Ford	(Sweden) OMSE2	Royal Purple OMSE2	7	(United States) Townsend Bell	2–3	Ford Fiesta ST
Ford	(Sweden) OMSE2	Royal Purple OMSE2	32	(Canada) Steve Arpin	All	Ford Fiesta ST
Ford	(Sweden) OMSE2	Rdio OMSE2	77	(United States) Scott Speed	All	Ford Fiesta ST
Ford	(Sweden) Olsbergs MSE	Olsbergs MSE	18	(Sweden) Patrik Sandell	All	Ford Fiesta ST
Ford	(Sweden) Olsbergs MSE	Rockstar Energy Olsbergs MSE	34	(United States) Tanner Foust	All	Ford Fiesta ST
Ford	(Sweden) Olsbergs MSE	Rockstar Energy Metal Mulisha Olsbergs MSE	38	(United States) Brian Deegan	All	Ford Fiesta ST
Ford	(Sweden) Olsbergs MSE	Bluebeam Olsbergs MSE	57	(Finland) Toomas Heikkinen	All	Ford Fiesta ST
Ford	(United States) Hoonigan Racing Division	Hoonigan Racing Division	43	(United States) Ken Block	All	Ford Fiesta ST
Hyundai	(United States) Rhys Millen Racing	Rhys Millen Racing	4	(France) Stephan Verdier	8–9	Hyundai Veloster
Hyundai	(United States) Rhys Millen Racing	Rhys Millen Racing	14	(Belgium) David Sterckx	6	Hyundai Veloster
Hyundai	(United States) Rhys Millen Racing	Rhys Millen Racing	67	(New Zealand) Rhys Millen	6, 9	Hyundai Veloster
Mini	(United Kingdom) LD Motorsport	LD Motorsport	33	(United Kingdom) Liam Doran	2–3, 5–6	Mini Countryman JCW
Mini	(United Kingdom) Prodrive	Prodrive	40	(United States) Dave Mirra	8–9	Mini Countryman JCW
Mitsubishi	(Brazil) X Team Racing	X Team Racing	12	(Brazil) Nelson Piquet Jr.	1, 4, 8–9	Mitsubishi Lancer
Mitsubishi	(Brazil) X Team Racing	X Team Racing	12	(Brazil) Guilherme Spinelli	2–3	Mitsubishi Lancer
Peugeot	(Brazil) XRC Team Brasil	XRC Team Brasil	12A	(Brazil) Eduardo Marques Jr.	1	Peugeot 207
Peugeot	(Brazil) XRC Team Brasil	XRC Team Brasil	13	(Brazil) Mauricio Neves	1	Peugeot 207
Subaru	(United States) Subaru Puma Rallycross Team USA	Subaru Puma Rallycross Team USA	11	(Norway) Sverre Isachsen	2–9	Subaru WRX STI
Subaru	(United States) Subaru Puma Rallycross Team USA	Subaru Puma Rallycross Team USA	40	(United States) Dave Mirra	2–7	Subaru WRX STI
Subaru	(United States) Subaru Puma Rallycross Team USA	Subaru Puma Rallycross Team USA	81	(United States) Bucky Lasek	2–9	Subaru WRX STI
Subaru	(France) Verdier Racing	Verdier Racing	12	(France) Stephan Verdier	6	Subaru WRX STI
Volkswagen	(Sweden) Marklund Motorsport	Marklund Motorsport	29	(United States) Buddy Rice	1	Volkswagen Polo
Volkswagen	(Sweden) Marklund Motorsport	Marklund Motorsport	29	(Sweden) Mattias Ekström	2–3	Volkswagen Polo
Volkswagen	(Sweden) Marklund Motorsport	Marklund Motorsport	29	(Russia) Timur Timerzyanov	6	Volkswagen Polo
Volkswagen	(Sweden) Marklund Motorsport	Marklund Motorsport	92	(Sweden) Anton Marklund	1–3, 6	Volkswagen Polo

== Schedule ==
Round	Location	Companion Event	Date
1	(Brazil) Foz do Iguaçu	X Games Brazil	April 21
2–3 (DH)	(Germany) Munich	X Games Munich	June 29–30
4	(United States) New Hampshire Motor Speedway	Lenox Industrial Tools 301	July 11
5	(United States) Bristol Motor Speedway	Standalone	July 20
6	(United States) Irwindale Event Center	X Games Los Angeles	August 4
7	(United States) Atlanta Motor Speedway	Standalone	August 10
8	(United States) The Dirt Track at Charlotte Motor Speedway	AACA AutoFair Fall Meet	September 22
9	(United States) Las Vegas	SEMA Automotive Trade Show	November 7

(DH): An event in Barcelona at Lluís Companys Olympic Stadium May 19 was called off because of weather conditions. The Munich round, originally scheduled for June 30, was converted into a doubleheader round with races on June 29 and 30.

== Season summary ==
The first event of the season in Foz do Iguaçu was performed on a purpose-built gravel track, with the start/finish straight having the only tarmac section. Fifteen drivers took part in the event. Liam Doran set the fastest laptime in the seeding round. Heat 1 was won by Finnish driver Toomas Heikkinen, who took advantage of a crash at the start of the heat. Ken Block took second place, with Liam Doran placed third, after retiring on Lap 1. Heat 2 was won by Brian Deegan followed by Travis Pastrana is second. Nelson Piquet Jr. finished third despite being penalized for a jump start. Bryce Menzies finished the heat in last place. In Heat 3 the reigning champion Tanner Foust took victory over Steve Arpin. Patrik Sandell and Mauricio Neves finished in third and fourth place, respectively. Scott Speed was the winner of Heat 4 by passing Anton Marklund on the last corner, despite spinning on the first lap. Buddy Rice ended up third, with Eduardo Marques Jr rounding off the heat. Buddy Rice won the Last Chance Qualifier, meaning he qualified for the final along with second-place finisher Patrik Sandell. Doran's car failure at the start of the race, retires both himself and Bryce Menzies, denying them both of qualifying for the final.

The Final saw mayhem at the first turn on Lap 1, which shook up the field, placing Heikkinen into the lead from Speed and Marklund after Lap 1. After Lap 2, Speed slowed down, which allowed Marklund to jump into second place. By the end of Lap 3, the race is red flagged, and is scheduled to restart, after retirements from Foust, Pastrana, Block and Rice. On the restart, Scott Speed sat on pole from a six car grid. Travis Pastrana, Buddy Rice, Ken Block and reigning champion Tanner Foust were all unable to make the restart. On Lap 1 Toomas Heikkinen aggressively made his way into the lead, ahead of Speed and Arpin by the end of the lap. On the second lap, Arpin took the joker lap, but failed to pass Speed, leaving the top three the same after the end of the lap. On Lap 4, Sandell takes the joker lap to pass Arpin into 3rd place, as Speed starts closing down Heikkinen for the lead. On the final lap, Speed finally used his joker lap to pass Heikkinen on the last corner of the race, to take the gold medal. Heikkinen won the silver, and Sandell the bronze. For all three of them it was their first X Games medals, most notably Speed, who had not ever drove a rally car prior to the event. Steve Arpin finished 4th, ahead of Brian Deegan in 5th, and Anton Marklund in 6th.

The second round of the season was set to take place in Lluís Companys Olympic Stadium, as part of the Barcelona X Games. Spanish drivers Nani Roma and Carlos Sainz, both Dakar Rally champions, arrived to debut in this event. However, after heavy rain all day, the whole event was eventually moved to Munich after several delays on May 19, and the Munich event turned into a doubleheader. Day 1 featured Liam Doran win in his new Mini, while Toomas Heikkinen won gold in race 2. The Subaru PUMA Rallycross Team USA made their 2013 debut, and Townsend Bell made his GRC debut in the #7 Royal Purple Ford Fiesta, for OMSE2.

Round 4 took place in Loudon, New Hampshire, at the New Hampshire Motor Speedway. GRC Lites made their debut there, and Joni Wiman won the first-ever Lites race. In the Supercar class, Travis Pastrana returned, and Tanner Foust led 9 of 10 laps in the final, but crashed in the final corner, handing the win to Heikkinen. The fifth round of the season took place in Bristol. Joni Wiman won the Lites final, which had to be restarted because Kevin Eriksson flipped over on the first lap. Patrik Sandell won his heat, but Heikkinen cruised to an easy third victory in a row. Round 6 took place at Irwindale Speedway, as part of X Games Los Angeles. David Sterckx, Rhys Millen, and Stephan Verdier made their 2013 debut, and Reinis Nitišs made his Lites debut. In Supercars, Sverre Isachsen won heat 1, which had to be restarted because Steve Arpin crashed. Heat 2 saw Liam Doran win. Toomas Heikkinen won Heat 3, while Heat 4 went to Ken Block. Anton Marklund crashed on the 1st turn of the LCQ, and that caused the 2nd red flag of the day. Marklund was out. On the restart, Rhys Millen and Scott Speed advanced. In the final, Ken Block, Liam Doran, and others crashed on the first turn. Toomas Heikkinen won the final X Games LA gold medal in history. Tanner Foust took silver, and Sverre Isachsen took bronze.

Round 7 took place at Atlanta Motor Speedway, as a standalone event. Bryce Menzies was replaced by Henning Solberg in the #99 Dodge, and Travis Pastrana was once again replaced by Timur Timerzyanov. Patrik Sandell crashed into a dirt embankment in the LCQ, sending him airborne. Toomas Heikkinen almost secured the championship with another win, while Joni Wiman won in Lites. Round 8 took place at the dirt track at Charlotte Motor Speedway, where Pat Moro debuted his new Chevrolet Sonic and Dave Mirra helped Prodrive make its official debut, after having rented its Mini to Doran for much of the season. Block, Speed and Deegan took heat victories, while Foust missed the final after rolling his car during the final heat. Speed won the final, while third place for Heikkinen (having qualified via the LCQ) gave him the championship title.

The season finale took place in Las Vegas during the week of the SEMA Show as a two-day event, with practice, seeding, and the first set of heats run on Wednesday and the second set of heats, LCQ, and final run on Thursday. Heikkinen aimed to continue his streak of eight consecutive podiums with a pair of heat wins, while Foust, Block, and Speed also swept each of their heats. The LCQ saw Nelson Piquet Jr. spin Sverre Isachsen to earn a transfer spot and land his Mitsubishi in the final, but a protest from Isachsen saw stewards disqualify Piquet for aggressive driving and restore the transfer spot to the Norwegian. In the final, a jump start from Foust forced him into the penalty box, giving Block a lead that he would never relinquish. Block would earn his first GRC victory in his 17th GRC start, while Foust ended the season with a runner-up finish and Travis Pastrana completed the podium.

== Results ==
=== Events ===
No.	Event	Seeding Round	Heat 1	Heat 2	Heat 3	Heat 4	Winner	Team	Manufacturer
1	Foz do Iguaçu	(United Kingdom) Liam Doran	(Finland) Toomas Heikkinen	(United States) Brian Deegan	(United States) Tanner Foust	(United States) Scott Speed	(United States) Scott Speed	(Sweden) OMSE2	Ford
2	Munich	(United Kingdom) Liam Doran	(United Kingdom) Liam Doran	(United States) Tanner Foust	(United States) Ken Block	(Finland) Toomas Heikkinen	(United Kingdom) Liam Doran	(United Kingdom) LD Motorsport	Mini
3	Munich	(Finland) Toomas Heikkinen	(Finland) Toomas Heikkinen	(Sweden) Mattias Ekström	(United Kingdom) Liam Doran	(United States) Brian Deegan	(Finland) Toomas Heikkinen	(Sweden) Olsbergs MSE	Ford
4	Loudon	(United States) Ken Block	(United States) Ken Block	(Finland) Toomas Heikkinen	(United States) Tanner Foust	N/A	(Finland) Toomas Heikkinen	(Sweden) Olsbergs MSE	Ford
5	Bristol	(United States) Ken Block	(United States) Ken Block	(Sweden) Patrik Sandell	(Norway) Sverre Isachsen	N/A	(Finland) Toomas Heikkinen	(Sweden) Olsbergs MSE	Ford
6	Irwindale	(United States) Brian Deegan	(Norway) Sverre Isachsen	(United Kingdom) Liam Doran	(Finland) Toomas Heikkinen	(United States) Ken Block	(Finland) Toomas Heikkinen	(Sweden) Olsbergs MSE	Ford
7	Atlanta	(Finland) Toomas Heikkinen	(Finland) Toomas Heikkinen	(United States) Ken Block	(United States) Tanner Foust	N/A	(Finland) Toomas Heikkinen	(Sweden) Olsbergs MSE	Ford
8	Charlotte	(United States) Ken Block	(United States) Ken Block	(United States) Scott Speed	(United States) Brian Deegan	N/A	(United States) Scott Speed	(Sweden) OMSE2	Ford
9	Las Vegas	(United States) Tanner Foust	(United States) Tanner Foust	(Finland) Toomas Heikkinen	(United States) Ken Block	(United States) Scott Speed	(United States) Ken Block	(United States) Hoonigan Racing Division	Ford

=== Drivers standings ===
Points are awarded to the top sixteen finishers using the following structure:

Position	**1st**	**2nd**	**3rd**	**4th**	**5th**	**6th**	**7th**	**8th**	**9th**	**10th**	**11th**	**12th**	**13th**	**14th**	**15th**	**16th**
Points	20	17	15	13	12	11	10	9	8	7	6	5	4	3	2	1

- **Bold** indicates the fastest in the seeding round.
- * indicates a heat win.

Pos.	Driver	Team	(Brazil) BRA	(Germany) MUN		(United States) LOU	(United States) BRI	(United States) IRW	(United States) ATL	(United States) CHA	(United States) LV	Pts
1	(Finland) Toomas Heikkinen	Olsbergs MSE	2*	3*	**1***	1*	1	1*	1**	3	4**	169
2	(United States) Tanner Foust	Olsbergs MSE	8*	6*	3	4*	7	2	2*	10*	2**	123
3	(United States) Ken Block	Hoonigan Racing Division	9	2*	DSQ	**5***	2**	6*	8**	7**	1**	115
4	(United States) Brian Deegan	Olsbergs MSE	5*	7	9*	3	3	**7**	6	2*	13	106
5	(United States) Scott Speed	OMSE2	1*	9	15	9	13	9	7	1*	9**	94
6	(Sweden) Patrik Sandell	Olsbergs MSE	3	8	13	2	5**	8	11	13	7	89
7	(Norway) Sverre Isachsen	Subaru Puma Rallycross		17	8	6	4*	3*	3	8	5	86
8	(Canada) Steve Arpin	OMSE2	4	11	5	12	6	14	9	5	8	79
9	(United Kingdom) Liam Doran	LD Motorsport	**13**	**1***	2*		9	10*				59
10	(United States) Travis Pastrana	Pastrana Racing	7			7		5		9*	3	56
11	(United States) Bucky Lasek	Subaru Puma Rallycross		14	11	8	12	11	12	6	14	49
12	(United States) Dave Mirra	Subaru Puma Rallycross/Prodrive		15	14	13	11	15	4	12	DNS	36
13	(United States) Bryce Menzies	Pastrana Racing	15	16	17	11	10	13		14	6	35
14	(Russia) Timur Timerzyanov	Pastrana Racing/Marklund Motorsport		10	12		8	18	5			34
15	(Sweden) Mattias Ekström	Marklund Motorsport		5	4*							26
16	(Sweden) Anton Marklund	Marklund Motorsport	6	4	16			17				26
17	(France) Stephan Verdier	Verdier Racing/Rhys Millen Racing						12		4	12	23
18	(New Zealand) Rhys Millen	Rhys Millen Racing						4			10	20
19	(Brazil) Nelson Piquet Jr.	X Team Racing	11			10				15	15	17
20	(United States) Townsend Bell	OMSE2		12	6							16
21	(Brazil) Guilherme Spinelli	X Team Racing		13	7							14
22	(United States) Pat Moro	PMR Motorsports								11	11	12
23	(United States) Buddy Rice	Marklund Motorsport	10									7
24	(Norway) Henning Solberg	Pastrana Racing							10			7
25	(Brazil) Mauricio Neves	XRC Team Brasil	12									5
26	(Brazil) Eduardo Marques Jr.	XRC Team Brasil	14									3
27	(Belgium) David Sterckx	Rhys Millen Racing						16				1
28	(Spain) Nani Roma	All4 Racing		-								0
29	(Spain) Carlos Sainz	Marklund Motorsport		-								0

Colour	Result
Gold	Winner
Silver	2nd place
Bronze	3rd place
Green	Finished, in points
Blue	Finished, no points
Blue	Not classified (NC)
Purple	Did not finish (Ret)
Black	Disqualified (DSQ)
White	Did not start (DNS)
White	Withdrew (WD)
White	Race cancelled (C)
Blank	Did not participate
Blank	Excluded (EX)

==== GRC Lites ====
Pos.	Driver	No.	Team	(United States) LOU	(United States) BRI	(United States) IRW	(United States) ATL	(United States) CHA	(United States) LV	Pts.
1	(Finland) Joni Wiman	93	Set Promotion	1	1	1	1	1	1	128
2	(Sweden) Sebastian Eriksson	37	Olsbergs MSE	2	5	3	3	3	3	93
3	(United States) Mitchell deJong	24	Olsbergs MSE	4		2	2	4	5	81
4	(Sweden) Kevin Eriksson	39	Set Promotion	3	6	4	5	7	6	75
5	(Sweden) Alexander Westlund	55	Set Promotion	5	3	6	4	5	7	74
6	(United States) Austin Dyne	99	AD Racing	6	2	10	8	8	4	66
7	(United States) Geoff Sykes	65	Olsbergs MSE	7	4	9	7	2	8	66
8	(United States) Harry Cheung	88	Cohesive Front Racing	9	7	8	9	6		46
9	(Turkey) Halid Avdagic	4	Olsbergs MSE	8	8	7				29
10	(Latvia) Reinis Nitišs	15	Olsbergs MSE			5	6			23
11	(United States) Tyler Benson	60	Olsbergs MSE				10	9	10	22
12	(Sweden) Eric Faren	21	Olsbergs MSE						2	18
13	(United States) Brent Lee	35	Olsbergs MSE						9	8
