= Sosnová (Česká Lípa District) =

- Municipality
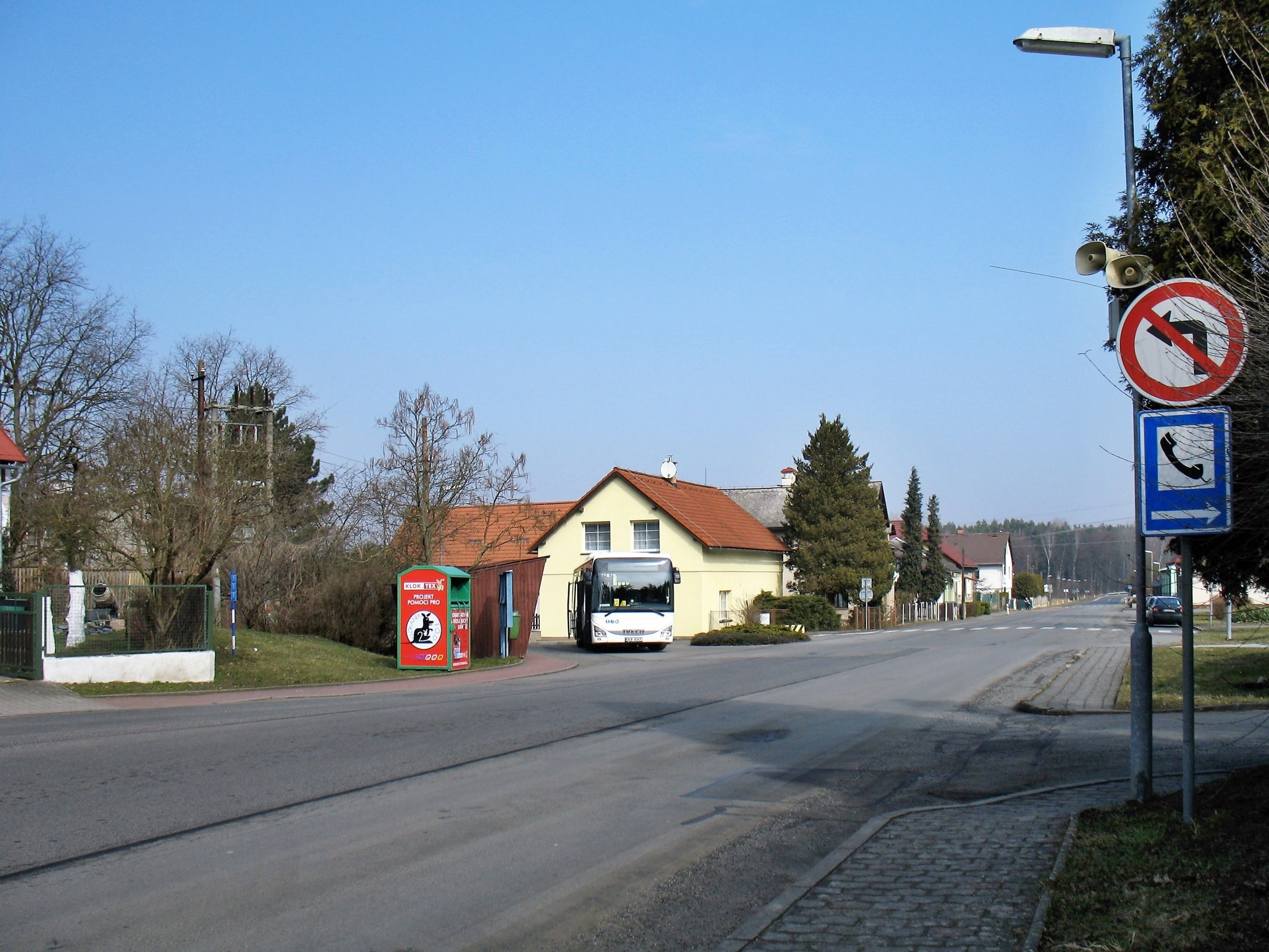
- Bus stop and main road

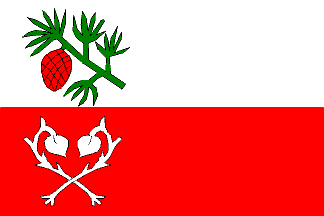
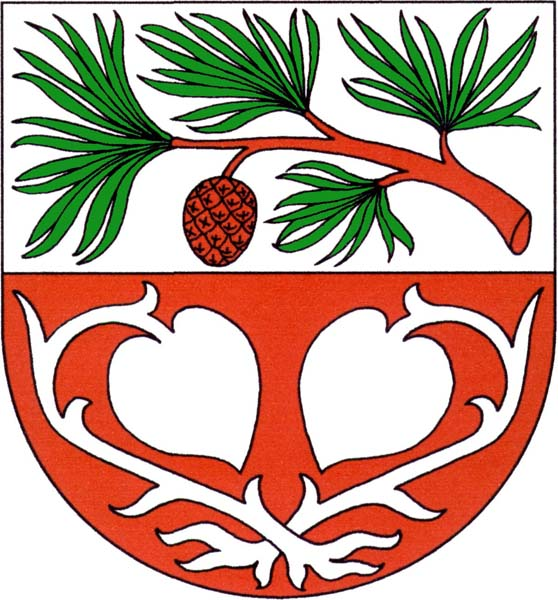
- Flag Coat of arms

- Location in the Czech Republic
- Coordinates: 50°39′18″N 14°31′57″E
- Country: Czech Republic
- Region: Liberec
- District: Česká Lípa
- First mentioned: 1554

Area
  - Total: 5.64 km^{2} (2.18 sq mi)
- Elevation: 254 m (833 ft)

Population (2026-01-01)
  - Total: 691
  - Density: 123/km^{2} (317/sq mi)
- Time zone: UTC+1 (CET)
  - Summer (DST): UTC+2 (CEST)
- Postal code: 470 01
- Website: www.sosnova.org

Sosnová (German: Künast) is a municipality and village in Česká Lípa District in the Liberec Region of the Czech Republic. It has about 700 inhabitants.

== Demographics ==
Historical population
Year	Pop.	±%
1869	312	—
1880	297	−4.8%
1890	280	−5.7%
1900	320	+14.3%
1910	383	+19.7%
1921	466	+21.7%
1930	427	−8.4%
1950	321	−24.8%
1961	380	+18.4%
1970	385	+1.3%
1980	482	+25.2%
1991	611	+26.8%
2001	693	+13.4%
2011	666	−3.9%
2021	677	+1.7%
Source: Censuses

== Sport ==
Sosnová is the site of the Autodrom Sosnová, an auto racing track.
