= Liam Doran =

British rallycross driver (born 1987)

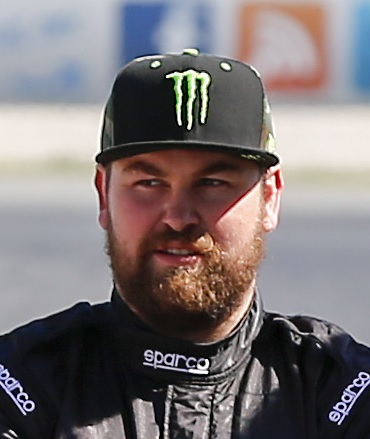
- Doran in 2015
- Nationality: (United Kingdom) British
- Born: 22 March 1987 (age 39)
- Relatives: Pat Doran (father)

FIA World Rallycross Championship career
- Debut season: 2014
- Current team: None
- Car number: 33
- Former teams: Monster Energy World RX; SDRX; JRM Racing
- Starts: 46
- Wins: 0
- Podiums: 1
- Best finish: 8th in 2019

Global RallyCross Championship
- Years active: 2011–2013
- Former teams: LD Motorsports; Doran Motorsport
- Starts: 13
- Wins: 2
- Podiums: 3
- Best finish: 9th in 2013

FIA ERX Supercar Championship
- Years active: 2011–2013
- Former teams: LD Motorsports; Doran Motorsport
- Starts: 29
- Wins: 3
- Podiums: 8
- Best finish: 2nd in 2012

FIA ERX Division 1 Championship
- Years active: 2009–2010
- Former teams: Kenneth Hansen Racing
- Starts: 16
- Wins: 2
- Podiums: 3
- Best finish: 3rd in 2010
Medal record
Representing the United Kingdom
X Games
Gold medal – first place	2011 Los Angeles	Rally Car Racing

Liam Doran (born 22 March 1987) is a British professional rallycross driver competing in the FIA World Rallycross Championship, Global RallyCross Championship, X Games, and European Rallycross Championship. He is the son of British rallycross driver and Lydden Hill Race Circuit owner Pat Doran. In his early life, he attended Fulston Manor School in Sittingbourne.

Having signed with Monster Energy in 2011, Doran has gone on to achieve an X Games Gold medal and numerous other accomplishments in various disciplines

== Racing career ==
=== 2000 ===
Doran started his career at the age of 14 choosing to follow in his fathers footsteps. In 2000, he competed in a junior Mini in the sport of rallycross. Doran progressed through the stages rapidly and continued in rallycross, driving a Citroën Saxo stockhatch and then a rear-wheel drive Ford Fiesta in 2007.

=== 2009 ===
In 2009, Doran ran among the quickest drivers in Europe in a Ford Fiesta ST Supercar and beat them, managing in the process to come second in the MSA British Rallycross Championship.

=== 2010 ===
Doran secured a drive with 14-times European Rallycross Champion Kenneth Hansen driving with the Citroën Total Rallycross Team in a Citroën C4. He managed to get to grips with the new Citroën very quickly and soon managed to get some outstanding results, being the driver to score the most points in the second half of the season, all this taking into consideration it was his first year at European level.

=== 2011 ===
In 2011, Doran had built up a reputation within the rallycross industry and resulting from this managed to sign with Monster Energy. The newly formed Monster Energy Citroën Rallycross Team opened new doors of opportunity for Doran.

Doran was invited to participate in X Games 17 and went in as the underdog to drivers such as Tanner Foust, Ken Block and Travis Pastrana. The X Games Rally final saw Doran go head-to-head with Marcus Grönholm, where he beat the former WRC Champion to win the Gold Medal.

From his US success an opportunity arose to compete in the Lucas Oil Off Road Racing Series (LOORRS). Following an impressive performance in his first race, he was offered the opportunity to drive in the series for 2012.

=== 2012 ===
With continued support from Monster Energy, Doran managed to achieve a second position in the 2012 European Rallycross Championship, concluding the season with a victory in Germany.

=== 2013 ===
With another full calendar scheduled and a new European rallycross team mate in 21-year-old Norwegian, Andreas Bakkerud, LD Motorsports was one of the strongest teams in the 2013 season.

This was Doran's most successful year winning 3 XGames medals. Doran won a gold and silver at XGAMES Munich and a bronze at XGAMES Los Angeles.

=== 2014 ===
For 2014, Doran raced a Citroën DS3 Supercar in the FIA World Rallycross Championship. He contested the first 6 rounds and the final round of the season, finishing in 25th overall with 17 points. For the other five rounds, he was later suspended from racing by his native autosport authority MSA because of his bad behavior against some track marshalls during the home ERX round at Lydden Hill when his father's Ford RS200 caught fire. He made the finals stage once, in Sweden, and finished fifth.

=== 2015 ===
For 2015, Doran continued in the World Rallycross Championship, this time combining with reigning World Champion Petter Solberg to create the SDRX team. He raced in all rounds excluding Germany where his car failed scrutineering. He scored points at seven events and failed to reach the final, finishing 16th in the standings on 35 points - 266 points behind his championship winning team-mate.

=== 2016 ===
Doran signed for JRM Racing in 2016, contesting the WRX season with a Mini Countryman. Despite the car still being in its development phase, Doran took a shock win in his Semi-Final at the 2016 World RX of Hockenheim - having made the Semis in the previous race in Portugal. He failed to score in three of the next four events, before he was fired following a drunken altercation at Gatebil prior to the Canadian round.

=== 2017 ===
Following his Gatebil incident, the governing body of motorsport in the United Kingdom suspended Doran's racing license for 12 months, preventing his participation in the 2017 season.

=== 2019 ===
Returning for 2019, Doran finished third at the Yas Marina Circuit, in the opening round.

== Racing record ==
=== Complete FIA European Rallycross Championship results ===
==== Division 1 ====
Year	Entrant	Car	1	2	3	4	5	6	7	8	9	10	ERX	Points
2009	Liam Doran	Ford Fiesta ST	GBR -	POR	FRA; 8	HUN; 13	AUT	SWE	BEL -	GER; 13	POL	CZE; 4	15th	30
2010	Kenneth Hansen Racing	Citroën C4	POR; 4	FRA; 3	GBR; 3	HUN; 7	SWE; 7	FIN; 1	BEL; 2	GER; 6	POL; 1	CZE; 6	3rd	112

==== Supercar ====
Year	Entrant	Car	1	2	3	4	5	6	7	8	9	10	ERX	Points
2011	Doran Motorsport	Citroën C4	GBR; 4	POR; 5	FRA; 3	NOR; 9	SWE; 10	BEL; 3	NED; 15	AUT; 9	POL; 11	CZE; 11	7th	83
2012	Doran Motorsport	Citroën DS3	GBR; 3	FRA; 8	AUT; 4	HUN; 6	NOR; 2	SWE	BEL; 6	NED; Ret	FIN; 2	GER; 1	2nd	104
2013	LD Motorsports	Citroën DS3	GBR; 11	POR; 1	HUN; 12	FIN; 4	NOR; 1	SWE; 35	FRA; 14	AUT; 7	GER; 9		5th	121

=== Complete Global RallyCross Championship results ===
==== Supercar ====
Year	Entrant	Car	1	2	3	4	5	6	7	8	9	GRC	Points
2011	Doran Motorsport	Citroën C4	IRW1	IRW2	SEA1	SEA2	PIK1; 8	PIK2; 10	LA1; 1	LA2; 8		11th	46
2012	Doran Motorsport	Citroën C4	CHA	TEX; 12	LA; 5	LOU; 7	LV	LVC; 14				15th	30
2013	LD Motorsports	Citroën DS3	BRA; 13									9th	59
2013	LD Motorsports	BMW Mini Countryman JCW		MUN1; 1	MUN2; 2	LOU	BRI; 8	IRW; 10	ATL	CHA	LV	9th	59

=== Complete FIA World Rallycross Championship results ===
==== Supercar ====
Year	Entrant	Car	1	2	3	4	5	6	7	8	9	10	11	12	13	WRX	Points
2014	Monster Energy World RX	Citroën DS3	POR; 19	GBR; 20	NOR; DSQ	FIN; 12	SWE; 5	BEL; 10	CAN	FRA	GER	ITA	TUR	ARG; 17		51st	2
2015	SDRX	Citroën DS3	POR; 15	HOC; 7	BEL; 14	GBR; 17	GER	SWE; 14	CAN; 15	NOR; 18	FRA; 17	BAR; 18	TUR; 21	ITA; 12	ARG; 15	16th	35
2016	JRM Racing	BMW Mini Countryman JCW	POR; 10	HOC; 5	BEL; 17	GBR; 19	NOR; 17	SWE; 16	CAN	FRA	BAR	LAT	GER	ARG		20th	9
2018	GC Kompetition	Renault Mégane RS RX	BAR	POR	BEL	GBR	NOR	SWE	CAN	FRA; 8	LAT; 12	USA	GER; 19	RSA		16th	19
2019	Monster Energy RX Cartel	Audi S1	UAE; 3	ESP; 10	BEL; 6	GBR; 6	NOR; 5	SWE; 15	CAN; 8	FRA; 9	LAT; 6	RSA; 16^{a}				8th	114
2020	Monster Energy GCK RX Cartel	Renault Mégane R.S. RX	SWE; 17	SWE; 17	FIN; 19	FIN; 14	LAT; 9	LAT; 12	ESP; 10	ESP; 16						13th	29

^{a} Loss of 15 championship points – stewards' decision
