= Greinbach =

- Municipality
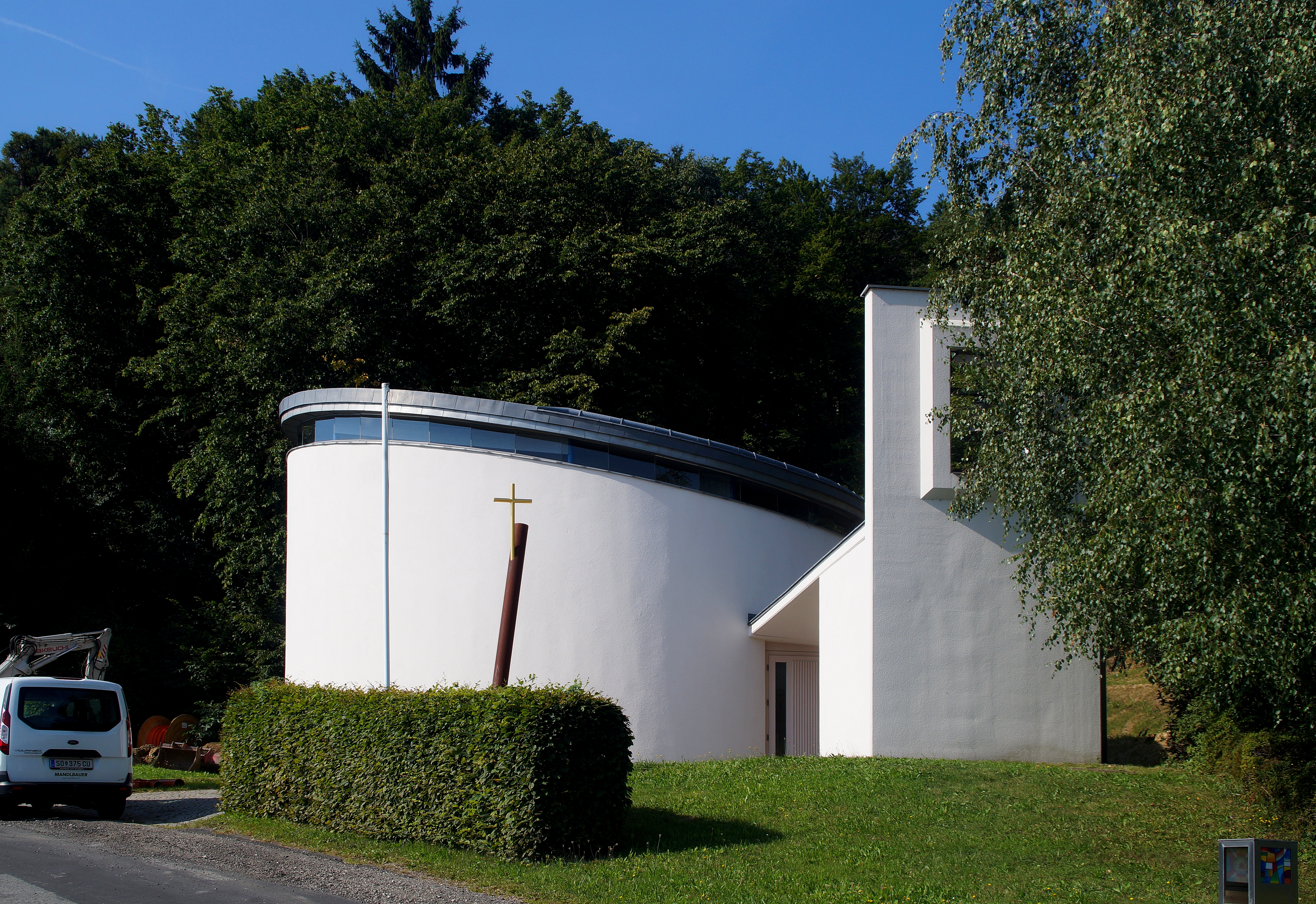

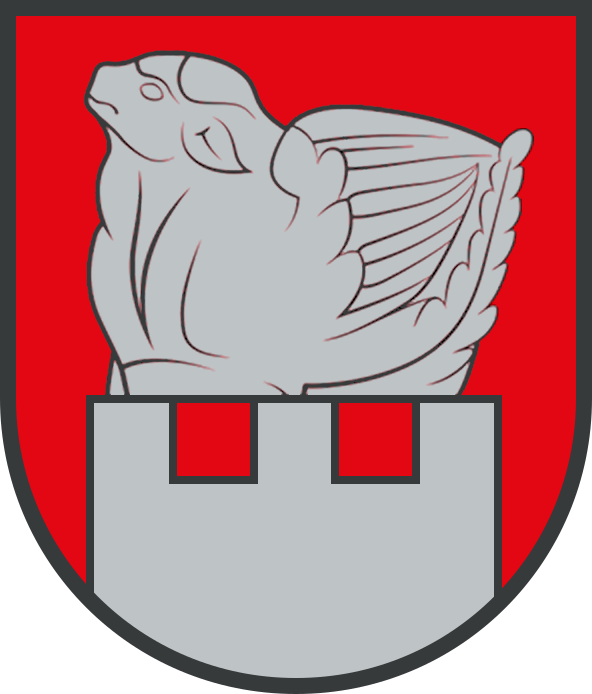
- Coat of arms

- Location within Austria
- Coordinates: 47°18′11″N 15°58′22″E
- Country: Austria
- State: Styria
- District: Hartberg-Fürstenfeld

Government
  - Mayor: Siegbert Handler (ÖVP)

Area
  - Total: 23.38 km^{2} (9.03 sq mi)
- Elevation: 420 m (1,380 ft)

Population (2018-01-01)
  - Total: 1,795
  - Density: 76.78/km^{2} (198.8/sq mi)
- Time zone: UTC+1 (CET)
  - Summer (DST): UTC+2 (CEST)
- Postal code: 8230, 8225
- Area code: 0 33 32
- Vehicle registration: HB
- Website: www.greinbach. steiermark.at

Greinbach is a municipality in the district of Hartberg-Fürstenfeld in Styria, Austria.
