= Top Gear (American TV series) season 5 =

Top Gear
- Season 5
- No. of episodes: 10

Release
- Original network: History Channel
- Original release: June 3 – October 21, 2014

Season chronology
- ← Previous; Season 4 Next → Season 6

The fifth season of Top Gear began airing on History from June 3, 2014 until October 21, 2014. Adam Ferrera, Tanner Foust, Rutledge Wood and The Stig returned as hosts, with ten weekly episodes being broadcast.

== Production ==
The fifth season began production in early 2014 premiered on June 3, 2014.

== Episodes ==
No. overall	No. in season	Title	Original release date	US viewers (millions)
53	1	"American Muscle"	June 3, 2014	1.26
Adam, Rutledge, and Tanner compete with their choice of "resto-mod" muscle cars in order to get a chance to compete in the Gatornationals drag race with their vehicles. Tanner drives a 1967 Shelby Mustang GT500 with 500hp, Rut chooses a 1972 Dodge Charger SE with 560hp, and Adam competes in a 1968 Chevrolet Camaro with 720hp.: Unofficial Challenge: Drag Race on the streets . Due to Adam's car being more powerful, in the beginning, he gets in the front . But, later on Tanner overtakes him . Winner: Tanner; Challenge 1: Shock Steering Wheel: They have to maintain focus so they do not jump start, causing a painful shock on the steering wheel, Rutledge achieves 53 seconds, Tanner achieves 54 seconds and Adam achieves 57 seconds. Winner: Rutledge; Challenge 2: Keeping Calm: After getting into their cars with boxes of creepy bugs, they are hooked up to a heart monitor. They opening the boxes and do the obstacle course. Lowest heart rate wins. Winner: Rutledge; Tie Breaker Challenge: Car Alarms. Adam and Tanner see whose car can set off the most car alarms. Adam sets of three and Tanner sets off all the alarms. Winner: Tanner; Reward: Rut and Tanner get to go to a professional drag strip and race modern versions of their cars. They are fully equipped dragsters. Tanner wins best 2 out of 3. (Rutledge 1, Tanner 2)
54	2	"Desert Trailblazers"	June 10, 2014	1.21
Tanner, Adam and Rutledge meet in the Arizona back country with three of the most technologically advanced off road machines available, where they are challenged to find their way to the Grand Canyon like the trailblazers of old–without GPS or smartphones. First one to touch his front wheels into the Colorado river wins. Adam chooses the AEV (American Expedition Vehicles) Brute, which is an off-road build up of the Jeep Rubicon. Tanner decides on using a 2012 Land Rover LR4. Rutledge drives a 2014 Toyota FJ Cruiser.: Challenge 1: River Crossing: After driving for several hours, the hosts decide to drive across a deep river to save time. Rutledge's FJ cruiser is almost swamped. Tanner's Land Rover makes it through, but Adams shows off the AEV Brute's abilities. Winner: Adam; Challenge 2: Devil's Staircase: The hosts have to climb a rocky, 45-degree incline. Tanner stalls out his vehicle several times before finally making it to the top. Adam's Brute has relatively little trouble due to its power and ground clearance. Rutledge's FJ Cruiser has the most trouble since it was the lightest of the three vehicles and had the least amount of horsepower. Winner: Adam; Challenge 3: After spending the night at a ski slope and going downhill on a snowboard trail, the hosts have a race up a slope composed of volcanic ash. Tanner races to the top, with Adam following behind and Rutledge getting stuck and needing to have a second running start to get up the hill. Winner: Tanner; Challenge 4: After a rough journey to the Grand Canyon, the hosts race to the Colorado River. Despite being a professional rally racer and knowing the course to the Colorado River, Tanner is beaten to the finish by Adam, due to him taking the most direct route and following the basic principle of water flowing down the path of least resistance. Rutlege comes in last. Winner: Adam; The hosts then have to go to an airstrip and drive into a cargo plane that is taking off. The overall winner for the episode is the AEV Brute as it was able to handle all types of terrain. The Land Rover suffers some minor damage though performed valiantly while the FJ Cruiser got stuck a lot and comes in last place.
55	3	"80s Power"	June 17, 2014	1.26
The guys each choose their favorite 1980s car and compete in a series of challenges to see which is the best for under $5000 and seek final judgment from a mystery 1980s celebrity. Rutledge chooses a 1988 Toyota MR2 Supercharged, Tanner drives a 1986 Chevrolet Camaro Iroc Z and Adam cheats and buys a 1986 Buick Grand National which is $15,000.: Challenge 1: Durability. Each of the guys have to drive through a car wash with shirts made out of popping candy, least wet wins. Due to the poor build quality of Tanner's Iroc, he gets some water in. Due to the Grand National being a coupe and Adam locking the doors he gets no water on himself. Both Adam and Tanner loosen the Targa Tops on Rut's MR2 so he gets the most wet. Winner: Adam; Challenge 2: Speed. They find a mile stretch to see which one of their classics can reach the highest top speed. Rut's MR2 had a Top Speed of 130mph, Tanner's Iroc had a Top Speed of 115mph and Adam's Grand National had a limited Top Speed of 126mph. Rut reaches 100mph and Tanner reaches 110mph despite when passing the mile point reached 116mph. Adam pushes too hard on the Grand National that he breaks it and only passes at 50mph despite it being the most powerful car. Tanner and Rut leave him behind and Rut comments how "Cheaters never win". Winner: Tanner; Challenge 3: Racing around Willow Springs against 80s challenge: Competitive Eating, Solving a Rubik Cube Blindfolded and Wiring a Cassette Tape. Tanner chooses the Rubik Cube man and Rut chooses the women with the cassette tape. Tanner starts by throwing his passenger's Rubik Cube in the back of the Iroc but that does not stop the man from finishing it at the top of the hill. Tanner sabotages so that he stops near where Rut stopped. In the end Tanner admits defeat and Rutledge claims victory. Winner: Rutledge; Challenge 4: Sumo-Wrestling. At their mystery client's area, Tanner and Rut find Adam who has managed to fix the Grand National. The celebrity in question is Lou Ferrigno and his challenge is to see which car is best at Sumo-Wrestling. Tanner's Iroc manages to beat Rut's MR2. Despite hurting his car, Adam's Grand National still manages to beat Rut's MR2. During the final challenge of Adam's Grand National vs Tanner's Iroc, Rut tells Lou that Adam is a cheater and bought a $15,000 car even though the budget clearly stated $5000. Annoyed by this despite Adam's win Lou disqualifies him from the challenge saying that his wins did not count as he cheated meaning that Rut came in second place and Tanner came in first. Winner: Tanner; Reward: Lou hands Tanner the keys to the fastest Ferrari currently on the roads–the Ferrari F12 Berlinetta which he takes for a test drive. He loves the 730hp V12, mind-blowing acceleration of 0-60 in 3.1seconds and the insane top-speed of 211mph. Upon heading to Sonoma Raceway in California he finds that the F12 handles beautifully and flies through corners with a sense of beauty. Too see if it has passion and soul he takes it for a drift challenge against a 700hp Chevrolet Camaro Drift Car. He finds that the F12 to drift even better than the Camaro. He concludes by saying that it has the best engine fitted to a car and has plenty of passion and soul, it is ultimately an absolute masterpiece.
56	4	"Snow Show"	June 24, 2014	1.36
With massive storms devastating ill equipped parts of America this winter, Tanner, Adam and Rutledge decide to do their civic duty by trying to make a multi-tasking municipal hybrid in the form of a snow-plow school bus. The person whose contribution is deemed the most useful gets to race the Nissan GTR against a competition level snowmobile.
57	5	"Off Road Big Rigs"	July 1, 2014	1.3
Tanner, Adam, and Rutledge have to deliver a load of logs to their destination. In the way to their destination, they will face challenging roads and off-roads.
58	6	"Cool Cars for Grownups"	July 8, 2014	1.09
Is it possible to have a family vehicle without giving up your high horsepower dreams? The guys each choose a brand new car which is both practical and fast and push them to their speed and maneuverability limits to find out which is the best family friendly super car. Adam chooses a 2014 Mercedes Benz E63 AMG S Wagon, Tanner chooses a 2014 Porsche Cayenne Turbo S and Rutledge chooses a 2014 highly modified Honda Odyssey with 1029hp which he describes as a dream car.: Challenge 1: Drag Racing Practicality. They must load some balls into the trunk of their cars but also fold the seats down and accelerate to 120mph to the end of the runway as quickly as possible and then brake. Fastest time wins. Tanner's Porsche achieved 3:01 but due to losing three balls his total was 3:16, Rut's Honda achieved 3:09 but due to losing two balls his total was 3:19 and Adam's Mercedes achieve 2:51 but due to losing 1 ball he achieved 2:56. Winner: Adam; Challenge 2: Popping and Changing the tire. They need to pop one of their cars tires and then replace as quickly as possible. Rut points out that since his Honda has the most power and is front wheel drive his tire will be the easiest to pop whereas Adam and Tanner have Four Wheel Drive Cars with less power. While Rut does a burnout in the Honda, Tanner removes the stability control fuse from the Porsche and does doughnuts whereas Adam uses a knife to pop the Mercedes' Tire. Whereas Rut and Tanner have spare tires as standard, Adam has to re-inflate his own tire. This ultimately means that Adam loses and since Tanner had to remove a fuse from his car, Rutledge is declared winner. Winner: Rutledge; Challenge 3: High Speed Cornering. Each car must chase a Chevrolet Corvette Z06 driven by the Stig over two laps of the Pikes Peak International Raceway and see how close they can get. Closest time in seconds wins. Adam's Mercedes is 11 seconds behind the Corvette, Rut's Honda is 21 seconds behind the Corvette and Tanner's Porsche is 4 seconds behind the Corvette. Winner: Tanner; Final Challenge: Race up Pikes Peak. They must each race up Pikes Peak and the car which gets to the top first will be crowned the best fun family car. Adam and Rut decide that since Tanner is a race car driver, he should give Adam a 30 second start and Rut a 40 second start and they also put a toy baby which spits Cheerios in the back of the Porsche. Despite this Tanner still overtakes Adam halfway up and risks his life in doing so, to which Adam calls Tanner a hypocrite for calling him "The crazy one". 3/4's of the way up Tanner overtakes Rut meaning that he is in front and eventually he crosses the line first. On the last turn Adam overtakes Rut putting him in second place. Winner: Tanner; In the End: Despite Adam and Rut's claims about their cars, Tanner still makes it clear that the Porsche's two victories compared to the Mercedes and the Honda's one each make it the ultimate fast family car. In the end Adam and Rut agree. Overall Winner: Tanner
59	7	"What Can It Take?"	September 30, 2014	N/A
Just how durable can a car be? Challenged to find three vehicles more than 25 years old and put them through a series of tests to see which one can last the longest. Meeting up in the Mojave Desert, they are given a series of challenges. Tanner chooses a 1988 Honda Civic LX, Rutledge a 1985 Mercedes Benz 300D TurboDiesel, and Adam a 1978 Mail Jeep.: Challenge 1: Remove the fan belt. Since Tanner's Honda has no fan belt, he removes the alternator belt instead. The challenge: to see whose car can successfully make it off the edge of a dry lake bed first. During the race Tanner's Honda takes off to an early lead, Rut's Mercedes in second and Adam's Jeep far behind. Not only was Adam's Jeep the slowest it was also the least refined nearly breaking Adam's back. Winner: Tanner; Halfway to their next challenge Tanner tries to keep stop/start to make Adam and Rut's cars overheat due to the lack of fan-belt.: Challenge 2: Remove the power steering. They then race around a dried river in a water park with no power steering. Tanner and Rut have to remove the power assisted steering in the Mercedes and the Honda whereas Adam's Jeep doesn't have power steering. However Rut and Tanner insisted that they need to make an adjustment to the Jeep, so they remove the steering wheel and replace it with pliers much to the annoyance of Adam. Fastest time wins. Despite Adam crashing into a tree he still completes the course with no damage and has a time of 1:43, During Rut's lap on the final corner he misses the second to last turn but despite this he completes the course in 52 seconds, During Tanner's lap he loses his rear bumper but completes the course in 41 seconds. Winner: Tanner; Halfway through the next run Rut's Mercedes overheats and he has to use an egg to fix a hole in the radiator.: Challenge 3: Remove unnecessary weight from the car. The guys strip down the cars and complete a barrel race to see whose car still runs with the least amount of weight. Tanner and Rut remove the doors, trunk and bonnet of the Mercedes and Honda whereas Adam removes the roof of the Jeep and Rut hands him back his steering wheel. Despite Stalling Adam's Jeep completes the course in 47 seconds, Rut's Mercedes completes the course in 46.43 seconds. Tanner loses so much weight, his Honda no longer has any stability. After the first turn he loses a wheel and is unable to finish. Adam and Rut leave him behind. Winner: Rutledge; Halfway to the final challenge it turns out that Tanner cut his Honda in half and manages to catch up with Adam and Rut.: Final Challenge: Remove and replace the oil. All three cars have their oil drained and replace with an alternative and reach civilization, Tanner with personal lubricant, Rutledge with maple syrup and Adam with lard. The overall winner is the one whose wreck of a car makes it the last 10 miles. Both Tanner's Honda and Rutledge's Mercedes crash out just one mile from the village whereas Adam's Jeep makes it to the finish line. Winner: Adam; In the End: Despite Tanner's two victories and Rut's car not actually losing a challenge, both cars had problems with reliability and structure, and didn't make it to civilization meaning that they lost. Adam's Jeep on the other hand proved to be durable and reliable. Overall Winner: Adam; Reward: Adam was given the keys to drive the new 2014 Rolls-Royce Wraith. He first adores the high quality and beautifully crafted interior and describes it as exquisitely over engineered. He then points out that the Wraith is the fastest production Rolls-Royce ever made with 6.6l V12 putting out 625hp so it does 0-60 in 4.4seconds. He does a burnout and reaches 105 mph. Adam then says that a Rolls-Royce is more a car to chauffeured in than to be driven so he arranges a chauffeur who turns out to be Tanner. He takes the Rolls-Royce on a stretch of Mulholland Drive in Los Angeles known as "The Snake". Tanner unleashes it on this road and drifts it through every corner much to the annoyance of Adam. Adam concludes by saying how the Wraith is a masterpiece as Rolls-Royce took two ideas and blended them perfectly and that you will never find a more perfect car on the road again.
60	8	"Need for Speed"	October 7, 2014	N/A
The guys travel to Germany for the ultimate high speed road trip in cars from Germany's largest manufacturer Volkswagen. Tanner picks the 2014 Volkswagen Golf R due to it being the fastest Volkswagen in the world. Rutledge claims that since Ferdinand Porsche designed the Bug and Volkswagen owns Porsche he is allowed to bring the 2014 Porsche 911 Carrera 4S. Adam claims that since Volkswagen bought Lamborghini in 1998 he is allowed to bring the 2014 Lamborghini Huracan. Right from the beginning Tanner knows that he's stuffed. They each must drive to the most famous racetrack in the world, the Nürburgring.: Challenge 1: Drag Race. The guys arrive at an airport and Adam and Rut agree to a drag race much to the annoyance of Tanner. During the drag race Tanner cheats and goes on 1 meaning that his Golf got an early start. However due to Adam's Lambo having greater horsepower he overtakes him easily and eventually Rut's Porsche does to. In the end Adam's Lambo comes in first, Rut's Porsche in second and Tanner's Golf in last. Winner: Adam; Challenge 2: Autobahn. The guys arrive at the Autobahn, a part of derestricted motorway. They each agree to max the cars and the one who could achieve the fastest speed would win. Tanner goes first and his Golf manages to reach 250 km/h (160 mph) until someone pulls out. Adam goes next and his Lambo manages to achieve 281 km/h (175 mph). On Rut's run he is initially blocked by a Dodge and this means that when he does finally max out his Porsche it only achieves 230 km/h (140 mph). Winner: Adam; Challenge 3: Town Travel. The guys arrive at the town of Goslar and agree to race to a church in the historic city centre. Despite Tanner having the most suitable car, Adam having the least suitable car and Rut getting slightly lost they all near the church. Rut's Porsche arrives first, Adam's Lambo arrives second and Tanner's Golf in last place. Winner: Rutledge; Challenge 4: Slalom. Due to Tanner not winning a single challenge he comes up with his own, at a parking course claiming that in order to master the Nürburgring the cars should also handle well. So he sets up some beer cans down the parking lot, the challenge being that each car must do the slalom and race back down to the race line. Tanner's Golf achieves a time of 14.70 seconds, Adam's Lambo achieves 15.69 seconds and Rut's Porsche achieves 14.50 seconds, meaning that Tanner couldn't even win a challenge he came up with. Winner: Rutledge; On the way to the Nürburgring Adam suggests that they race to the exit by which he comes first, Rut Second and Tanner last.: Final Challenge: They arrive at the Nürburgring where Tanner suggests he needs a car with new tires. In this case it means that he swaps his Golf for a Volkswagen Golf 24hr Race Car with 450hp and much lighter than the Golf R. Adam and Rut claim that he's cheating but he argues he still has a VW compared to their cars and he agrees to no longer take part in the challenge. He completes the course in 7:42. Now it's down to Adam and Rut. Rut goes a minute before Adam and manages to get his Porsche into its comfort zone and completes the course in 9:42. Adam despite being Sloppy in the corners manages to unleash his Lambo on the long straight and completes the course in 9:43. Winner: Rutledge; In the End: Adam and Rut agree that the Golf was the sore loser of the bunch and despite the Lambo's best efforts, it was the Porsche that is seen as the best car in Germany and overall, they and Tanner couldn't think of anywhere better to travel and a better race track than the Nürburgring. Overall Winner: Rutledge
61	9	"Weekend Race Cars"	October 14, 2014	N/A
One of the best ways to get into professional auto racing is to start racing with your personal car, and over 130,000 Americans are giving it a try by racing their daily driver on weekends. But what if you want to try several different kinds of racing to see which you excel at? Could there be a daily driver that is competitive in many types of races? The guys decide to find out when they each pick a competent daily driver then compete in a series of different, and increasingly out-there, races. They meet up at the Auto Club Speedway in Fontana, California. Tanner buys a 1999 Mazda Miata with a 140hp engine in a light weight car and due its barebones no thrill performance, Rutledge selects a 2002 Subaru WRX Wagon with 227hp in a rally bred machine and due to its practicality as well as racing heritage and Adam drives a 1969 Volkswagen Baja Bug with only 50hp but is possibly best RWD car at going off road.: Challenge 1: Asphalt. Each car must complete a full lap of the Auto Club Speedway to see which one will rule the track. Rut's Subaru completes the course in 1.37.6. Despite Adam fitting racing slicks on his Bug, and despite him cutting corners it completes the course in 2.02.0. Despite Tanner's arm being handcuffed to the side of his car, his Miata completes the course in 1.33.0. Winner: Tanner; Challenge 2: Mud. The guys head to the Pomona Fairplex where they find a mud bog which they must drive through. Fastest time from one end to the next wins. Rut's Subaru struggles very rarely and gets through in 9seconds. Despite taking a run up Tanner's Miata struggles through the Bog and completes the course in 41seconds. Despite stalling at the flag Adam's Bug completes the course in 6seconds. Winner: Adam; Challenge 3: Dust. The guys head to the Lake Elsinore Motor Sports Park where they must each compete in a one lap race across the dusty hills. First to cross the line wins. In the beginning Tanner's Miata takes an early lead, Rut's Subaru close behind and Adam's Bug far behind. However on the final corner Rut takes Tanner on the inside meaning that he crosses the line first, Tanner in second and Adam in Last. Winner: Rutledge; Final Challenge: Automotive Chicken. The guys must each race down a hill without using the brakes. If they do the horn of the car will sound. First to cross the line wins. Adam's Bug is left far behind initially and due to the dust from Tanner and Rut's cars means that he slams on the brake first. Halfway down the hill Tanner's Miata knocks into Rut's Subaru meaning that he slammed on the Brakes next. Tanner crosses the line and ultimately claims that the best weekend race car is the Miata. Winner: Tanner; Reward: Tanner gets to drive the 2014 Bowler EXR-S rally car in the highlands of Scotland. He is impressed with its Speed and agility but slightly criticises the $240,000 price tag. He then races it against an Enduro bike through a Scottish Trail on and off road. Despite having a slower start Tanner overtakes near the finish line and wins. Ultimately Tanner thinks that the Bowler is a masterpiece and names it his favourite car at the moment.
62	10	"Appalachian Trail"	October 21, 2014	1.24
The Appalachian Trail spans 2,168 miles from Maine to Georgia, and takes 3 to 6 months to hike. But what if you don't have that kind of time? The guys are given the monumental task of driving a road-based version of all 14 states on the trail in just 1 day. Adam picks a 1998 supercharged Jaguar XJR, Rutledge buys a 2003 Mercedes Benz CL500 and Tanner takes a 2002 Mitsubishi Montero. With just 24 hours to complete their task they barely have time to stop and must come up with all sorts of ideas to save time.
