= Top Gear (American TV series) season 1 =

Top Gear
- Season 1
- No. of episodes: 10

Release
- Original network: History Channel
- Original release: November 21, 2010 – January 23, 2011

Season chronology
- Next → Season 2

The first season of Top Gear began airing on History from November 21, 2010 until January 23, 2011. Consisting of ten episodes, the hosting line-up consisted of Adam Ferrera, Tanner Foust, Rutledge Wood and The Stig. The segments included Power laps and Big Star, Small Car (a renamed version of Star in a Responsibly Priced Car).

Due to the success of the first season, the programme was renewed for a second season, which aired in 2011 and 2012.

== Production ==
After years of development, History Channel ordered an American version of Top Gear, with Adam Ferrera, Tanner Foust, Rutledge Wood and The Stig included as the hosts. A trailer for the first season aired on August 6, 2010, showing the hosts participating in a Moonshine Challenge and Foust taking the Dodge Viper for a test drive. The season premiered on November 21, 2010, and concluded on January 23, 2011. The season finale aired as a "Best of Top Gear" special, which included highlights and best moments for season 1.

== Episodes ==
No. overall	No. in season	Title	Original release date	US viewers (millions)
1	1	"Cobra Attack"	November 21, 2010	1.93
Guest: Buzz Aldrin Feature: As a tribute to the end of the Dodge Viper SRT10's production, Tanner and Rutledge head to the latter's hometown of Griffin, Georgia to participate in a challenge pitting it against an AH1 Cobra attack helicopter. The hosts drove across town and back while being hunted by the Cobra; the car was fitted with a system to detect when they were "hit" by one of the helicopter's missiles, with a total of three "lives" before they lost the challenge. After losing two lives at varying points of the trip (the first while exiting the airfield, the second at the halfway point of the trip), they were hit for the final time shortly after re-entering the airfield. After the film, the Top Gear test track and the Stig are introduced, and the Viper is sent around the track setting a lap time of 1:22.0. Big Star, Small Car: Adam introduces the Suzuki SX4 Sportback as the show's "Small Car". Challenge: In an effort to find the best Lamborghini in the world, the hosts are each asked to pick their favorite. Adam chooses the Gallardo LP 570–4 Superleggera due to its lightness, Tanner chooses the Gallardo LP 550–2 Balboni due to it being tailored to professional drivers, and Rutledge chooses the Murciélago LP 670–4 SuperVeloce for its speed. They decide to settle their argument by racing each one in a standing mile; Rutledge reaches 175 mph, Tanner reaches 173 mph, and Adam wins with 180 mph. After the film, all three cars set a lap around the test track, with only the Superleggera's lap actually being shown.: Gallardo LP 550–2 Balboni: 1:26.9; Murciélago LP 670–4 SuperVeloce: 1:23.4; Gallardo LP 570–4 Superleggera: 1:22.8
2	2	"Blind Drift"	November 28, 2010	1.28
Guest: Dominic Monaghan Feature: Tanner races two skiers down Mammoth Mountain in a Mitsubishi Lancer Evolution. Tanner uses a crowded mountain road for the first part of the race, while the skiers must take a gondola to the top of the mountain and ski down, eventually meeting Tanner on the slopes for the last leg. Tanner wins the race, greeting the skiers at the bottom. Later in the show, the Lancer sets a lap time of 1:29.2 on the test track. Review: Rutledge reviews and compares the Aston Martin V8 Vantage and the V12 Vantage on a dry lake bed in El Mirage, California on the edge of the Mojave Desert. Rutledge states that the V8 Vantage has too much weight and not enough horsepower but that the V12 Vantage has the horsepower to make it a great car. Only the V12 Vantage was put on the track for a power lap and completed it in 1:28:2. Challenge: Adam and Rutledge challenge Tanner to a drifting competition using three Nissan 370Zs. They declare that Tanner (a professional drifter) is not allowed to compete himself, and force him to instead coach a blind man, Brian Fischler. After a short lesson to teach Brian the basics, they proceed with the first event, to see who can make the longest burnout. Brian wins, with Adam unable to set a mark, and Rutledge in second. The second event involved the hosts doing as many donuts as possible within a circle of cones; Rutledge wins by default after Brian and Adam are unable to complete a donut. The final competition was handbrake parallel parking; although Adam and Rutledge manage to get within the allotted space, Brian wins the final event and the competition.
3	3	"Flying Coupe DeVille"	December 5, 2010	1.30
Guest: Ty Burrell Feature: The hosts are given a budget of $1,000 to buy a car and report to North Wilkesboro, North Carolina. Rutledge buys a 1987 Ford Thunderbird TurboCoupe, Tanner buys a 1987 Nissan 300ZX and Adam buys a 1976 Cadillac Coupe DeVille. To test the cars, they transport 25 gallons each of grain alcohol in a simulation of moonshine running.: Challenge 1: The hosts perform a handbrake "bootleg turn" on a backroad. Tanner is the only one to succeed and has the fastest lap, while Rutledge and Adam fail to varying degrees and also manage to break many of the jars of grain alcohol; Adam came in second and Rut in third. Winner: Tanner On the way to their next challenge Rut's T-Bird breaks down; Adam and Tanner to leave him behind. He has to sacrifice some of his alcohol to be used as water to cool down the engine.; Challenge 2: The hosts are forced to spend the night at a campsite, spitting some of the alcohol into a fire to amuse themselves before sleeping in their cars. Given Adam's car being the only one with rear seats, he wins. Winner Adam; Challenge 3: The next morning, the hosts arrive at an outdoor motocross track to test their cars' durability. Tanner and Rutledge complete their runs, breaking more of their cargo in the process. Adam achieves the fastest time, although he destroys the car (and the remnants of his cargo) in the process. Tanner came in second and Rutledge in Third. Winner: Adam; Challenge 4: At Rockingham Speedway, Tanner and Rutledge (Adam having destroyed his car) must drive around the facility's infield circuit, avoiding capture by the Stig in a Dodge Charger police car after a fifteen-second head start. Tanner is able to elude the Stig, but Rutledge's car fails to go into gear and he completes the course on foot. Winner: Tanner; Final Challenge: The guys finally see who kept the most alcohol. Adam and Rutledge had no alcohol left whereas Tanner still had some bottles left meaning he won. Winner: Tanner; Tanner claims ultimate victory and concludes by saying the best coupe for less than $1000 is a Nissan 300ZX.
4	4	"Halo vs. Velociraptor"	December 12, 2010	1.27
Guest: Kid Rock Feature: Tanner tests (or "flies") a Ford F-150 SVT Raptor that has been modified by Hennessey Performance into a "VelociRaptor 475". He drives it off a paved road onto dirt and performs jumps with the truck, noting how the soft suspension lets it drive like a Cadillac. He then has a race against a HALO jumper. Tanner has to navigate the truck past sand traps, jumps and cows. The HALO jumper starts at an altitude of 25,000 feet (7,600 m) and dives to the finish line by spiraling the parachute at the end to descend quickly and take the narrow win. Review: Adam drives the Mercedes-Benz SLS AMG on the test track. Though he praises the super car's power and the engine and exhaust note, he dislikes the rear styling (saying that the car 'runs out of ass') and that while the car is at home on the track, it is not as good around town due to the stiff suspension. He loved the original 300SL Gullwing but only loved parts of the new car. The Stig sets a time of 1:27.6 on the test track. Challenge: In order to find a cost-effective and less-expensive replacement for the aging military Humvee, Rutledge and Adam mount several paintball guns to a 1997 Honda del Sol and 1977 Chevrolet El Camino, respectively, and race to the other end of a paintball range. Rutledge claims victory and forces Adam to shoot himself in the foot.
5	5	"Beater Boot Camp"	December 19, 2010	1.36
Guest: Tony Hawk Feature: As American taxpayers are now shareholders in General Motors, the hosts choose three vintage GM-produced cars to find one that they will lobby GM to begin producing again. Adam chooses a 1971 Oldsmobile Cutlass Supreme, Tanner a 1986 Pontiac Fiero, and Rutledge a 1996 Buick Roadmaster estate wagon. They drive 100 miles from their meet-up point in Detroit to the Eaton Proving Grounds in Marshall, Michigan.: Challenge 1: 0–60 mph test. Winner: Tanner; Challenge 2: The hosts must drive partially up a 20% incline, engage the car's parking brake, and retrieve a bowling ball from outside the car before proceeding to the top of the hill. Adam and Tanner abandoned their attempts, with the latter's car rolling back down the hill into the former's car, but Rutledge manages to easily complete the challenge. Winner: Rutledge; Challenge 3: On a wet skid pad, the hosts must navigate a timed course of cones while carrying ten cups of soda within arm's reach, with a five-second penalty for each cup spilled. Winner: Rutledge; Challenge 4: The hosts must drive over the facility's rumble strip at 30 mph with a colander full of eggs attached to the roof directly over their heads. While the attempts of his co-hosts turn out predictably (with their eggs being completely broken), Rutledge kept his eggs intact by dampening the colander's vibrations with his head. Winner: Rutledge; Challenge 5: After the cars are filled with water, the hosts must each drive the facility's oval test track, stopping once the water level has gone below the steering wheel. While Tanner cannot start his car, Adam and Rutledge both manage a full lap, the latter traveling a few car lengths further. Winner: Rutledge; After dropping off the victorious Roadmaster at GM headquarters, the three have several concept pictures for a modernized Roadmaster drawn up, which they present at the end of the episode.
6	6	"Fast in Florida"	December 26, 2010	N/A
Guest: Michelle Rodriguez Review: Tanner flies to Britain to test the Morgan Aero SuperSports, a car with a wooden frame. He notes that Morgan is one of the last British car manufacturers not to be owned by a foreign company. Detouring onto a nearby proving ground, Tanner laments that the SuperSports seems ill-suited to driving quickly due to its shape not producing enough downforce, believing that it is more suited to casual driving on the country roads. Feature: The three hosts race from Miami, Florida to the southernmost point in the United States in Key West. Rutledge takes a Donzi 38 ZR speedboat; Adam drives a Lotus Evora along the numerous bridges connecting the Keys to the mainland; Tanner, after taking a taxi to a seaplane yard, flies in a Cessna 206. Tanner arrives on the island first, but must rent a scooter to reach the finish; Rutledge charters a taxi after reaching the shore. Tanner pulls up to the marker first, but is beaten by Adam after stopping to deploy the bike's kick-stand.Winner: Adam
7	7	"Used Car Salesmen"	January 2, 2011	N/A
Guest: Tim Allen Challenge: Rutledge drives the new Honda CR-Z hybrid, which he finds to be slow and less economical than even the Toyota Prius. To test the car, he teams up with Adam and races two mountain bikers across San Francisco. Due to several navigational errors, as well as Rutledge being distracted by the features of the car, the bikers narrowly win the race. Feature: The three hosts are given $3000 to buy used cars at an auction and sell them for a profit. Tanner buys a Porsche 914, which lacks reverse and first gears, for $1850; Rutledge buys a relatively problem-free 1992 Lexus LS for $2250; Adam buys a 1987 Acura Legend for $870. The three are given the night to use the remainder of their budget to fix their cars and make them more saleable. The next morning, Tanner reveals he spent the rest of his money on a new coat of paint (not bothering to do anything with the transmission) and hires two attractive women to entice prospective buyers. Rutledge has painted his car "stealth" black and plans to market his car as a family vehicle with pony rides and a barbecue. Adam decides to market his car as a calm, stress-free vehicle, incorporating a coat of green paint and adding a set of bells. After several attempts to make a deal, Tanner sold his car for the same price as he bought it, losing $1150 total. Adam is the only one to profit, making $44 after selling his car at $1450. Rutledge is unable to sell his car, but manages to auction it to a member of the studio audience for $1 and the buyer's Members Only jacket.
8	8	"Car vs. Plane"	January 9, 2011	1.14
Guest: Bret Michaels Review: Rutledge reviews the Porsche Panamera Turbo. He praises Porsche for making a four-door sedan into a super car but criticizes the car's ugliness. The Stig takes the car around the track in 1:25.3. Feature: Tanner and Rutledge race from Hollywood to Las Vegas to determine if driving or flying is a faster mode of transportation when your journey is under 500 miles. Rutledge takes a taxi to the airport, then, after a 50-minute delay, flies to Las Vegas, where he charters another taxi to the finishing point. Tanner drives a Ferrari California, which almost runs out of fuel in the early stages of the trip, forcing him to draft behind a truck to save fuel. Tanner narrowly wins, but admits that Rutledge would have won if his flight had not been delayed as long. Review: Tanner reviews the BMW X6M. While he enjoys how quick the car seems to be compared to its size, he finds difficulty figuring out what it can be called.
9	9	"America's Toughest Truck"	January 16, 2011	2.05
Feature: To determine America's toughest truck, the hosts travel to Alaska. They are given $3,000 to buy pick-up trucks, with the conditions that the truck has at least 150,000 miles (240,000 km) and are bought sight unseen. Tanner buys a 1983 Chevrolet C/K, Rutledge buys a 1997 Dodge Ram, and Adam buys a 1976 Ford F-250. After seeing their purchases for the first time, they are informed that anyone whose truck breaks will be forced to drive an imported Toyota Hilux, which they claim will make them a national disgrace.: Challenge 1: Each host must accelerate their truck to 30 miles an hour along a trail, then brake at a marker placed 30 feet from the edge of a lake. Adam and Tanner pass with several feet to spare, but, due to his co-hosts moving the marker closer to the water, Rutledge fails. The hosts are then told to drive to Fairbanks, where they are told that they must convert their trucks into campers overnight to survive in the wilderness. The next day, Tanner reveals he has built a metal ramp-shaped tent, to which he has attached several spoilers, which he claims will generate additional downforce. Rutledge has built a log cabin in the back of his truck, although it features a hole at the end of the bed for his feet. Adam has attached a large metal cage with pictures of lions, which he hopes will scare off any wild animals.; Challenge 2: The three must climb to the top of Fish Creek. Along the way, all three get stuck; Adam during a river crossing, and Tanner and Rutledge (in the same place) bog down on the muddy trail. Each time their co-hosts pitch in and pull them out. Eventually, they make it to the top, where they make camp.; Challenge 3: As their final challenge, the team must drive further south to a glacier, and drive upon it to complete their challenge. Early on, Adam's truck hits a rock and breaks its driveshaft, thus relegating him to the Hilux and leaving Rutledge and Tanner to press on. Eventually, several trips through the mud begin to take their toll on Rutledge's truck and, after several scares, it finally dies as well. With both of his co-hosts stuck in the Hilux, Tanner declares himself the winner, but, after being reminded he still has to finish himself, rams the back of his truck into one of the nearby icebergs and climbs onto it to claim victory.
10	10	"Best of Top Gear"	January 23, 2011	N/A
Tanner, Rutledge and Adam look back on the best moments and favourite highlights from the first season of Top Gear.
