= Top Gear (American TV series) season 3 =

Top Gear
- Season 3
- No. of episodes: 16

Release
- Original network: History Channel
- Original release: August 14, 2012 – April 2, 2013

Season chronology
- ← Previous; Season 2 Next → Season 4

The third season of Top Gear began airing on History from August 14, 2012, until April 2, 2013. Adam Ferrera, Tanner Foust, Rutledge Wood and The Stig returned as hosts, with sixteen weekly episodes being broadcast. This season was the first not to include segments, including car reviews, studio segments, Power laps and Big Star, Small Car, as they were discarded from the programme before season 3 commenced.

== Production ==
On May 11, 2012, History renewed Top Gear for a third season. The season premiered on August 14, 2012, and ended on April 2, 2013. This season saw the discontinuation of car reviews, studio segments, Power laps and Big Star, Small Car; they were discarded in order to revamp the show with a whole new style of format, compared to the UK version.

== Episodes ==
No. overall	No. in season	Title	Original release date	US viewers (millions)
27	1	"Police Cars"	August 14, 2012	1.7
The Ford Crown Victoria, once the bestselling police patrol vehicle available, is now out of production. After a short sendoff, the hosts each select which new cop car they feel will replace it. Rutledge's selection is a Police Patrol Vehicle (PPV) based on the 2012 Chevrolet Caprice, while Adam's selection is a 2012 Dodge Charger Police Package. Tanner selects the upcoming Ford Police Interceptor: Challenge 1: The hosts visit Ford's proving ground, where they are instructed to accelerate to 100 MPH, then brake. The one to break in the shortest distance wins. Winner: Tanner; Challenge 2: The group makes their way to a tactical training facility. The hosts are to sit in their vehicles, which will be wrapped in a completely sealed bubble. A tear gas grenade is then detonated within the bubble, outside of the vehicle, to see how well the vehicle can keep the gas out. The hosts are challenged to stay in their vehicle for five minutes, with the option to tap out if things become unbearable. Adam and Tanner complete the time, not without difficulty. Rutledge shortly taps out, and afterwards it's revealed Tanner sabotaged him. Winner: Tanner and Adam; Challenge 3: The hosts are to navigate an obstacle course wearing a police vest. Winner: Rutledge; Reward: The overall winner, declared as Tanner, gets the chance to drive a police pursuit vehicle based on the Chevrolet Corvette Z06, and give chase to a man on a Triumph motorcycle. Tanner manages to catch him, but barely.
28	2	"Small Cars"	August 21, 2012	2.07
The hosts each select which they feel is the best city vehicle available today. Adam selects a Fiat 500, Rutledge a Scion iQ and Tanner a Smart ForTwo.: Challenge 1: The group has to race to Algiers Point. Rutledge, remembering visiting New Orleans as a kid, decides taking the ferry is the quickest option, citing that the bridge they have to cross usually has slow traffic. Adam and Tanner drive the whole way, with the traffic on the bridge being, to Rutledge's surprise, very light. Just as Adam is about to reach the destination, Tanner shows up and cuts him off. Winner: Tanner; Challenge 2: As they make their way to a swamp, the hosts decide to mark their cars asking people to honk a certain number of times for each car (e.g. honk once for Smart, honk twice for Scion). Adam decides to write "honk three times for Jesus" on his car. Adam is the only host to get any response. Winner: Adam; Challenge 3: The hosts dress up their vehicles to head out into the swamp. Rutledge affixes longhorns to the hood and a gunrack to the back, while Tanner camouflages his vehicle. Adam adds truck nuts. The three then go out into the swamp, accompanied by a hunter, to attempt to bring back food for a barbecue. None of the hosts are successful, so they leave to purchase food. Tanner and Adam each bring back a gator, while Rutledge brings back crawfish, which were let loose in the vehicle by Tanner.; Challenge 4: The hosts hold a tug of war between their vehicles and an airboat. All vehicles perform poorly, especially Adam's, which launches him into a rant against nature.; Punishment The loser is tasked with going about a normal day in their life in a Peel Trident. The confused hosts settle on Rutledge, who performs various tasks such as grocery shopping, getting coffee and visiting his mom all while staying in his vehicle. At the end, he reports in for work, and plays the role of a pace car during a race at the Atlanta Motor Speedway.
29	3	"Cult Classics"	August 28, 2012	1.57
The boys have to choose one of their favourite cult classics. Adam choose a Cadillac Allanté, Rutledge choose a Subaru SVX, and Tanner choose the Merkur XR4Ti.: Challenge 1: Test the claims of the marketed unique features.; Allanté: Groundbreaking road sensing suspension. Adam has to drive 50 mph over a series of speed bumps with volatile cargo in the passenger seat. Half of the sixteen bottles of champagne survived.; XR4Ti: The height of German precision engineering. Tanner has to navigate through a makeshift racetrack with German brats and passengers in under 30 seconds. Tanner completes the course in exactly 30 seconds knocking over three pylons including the one moved closer together at the finish line.; SVX: Ability to drive in the rain with the windows down and not get wet. Rutledge has to drive two laps while following a 4,000-gallon water truck while wearing a suit made of sponges. Rutledge was mostly dry, but the car was very wet inside.; Results: Adam lost half his champagne. Rutledge was half wet. Tanner completed the course in the 30 seconds allotted. Winner: Tanner; Challenge 2: Sell the car in a live TV commercial.; SVX: Rutledge uses a smokescreen while dressed in a spacesuit and riding a Segway PT.; XR4Ti: Tanner drifts around a light pole and announcer then presents the car.; Allanté: Adam dressed up in a tux and promises the world.; Results: Rutledge buys Tanner's XR4Ti for $600. Winner: Tanner; Punishment Double Decker BMW "10 Series" (a 3 series welded to the top of a 7 series) at Irwindale Speedway. Rutledge chooses Dax Shepard as his co-driver while Sean Hayes goes with Adam. They race three laps of a head-to-head race. Results Rutledge and Dax win in the final lap.
30	4	"One Tank"	September 4, 2012	2.02
The guys race from Portland, Oregon, to San Francisco, California, without being able to get gas; the toughest off-road machine in the world. Adam choose a Ford F350, Rutledge choose a 1997 Volkswagen Passat (B4) TDI, and Tanner choose the BMW 528i.: Main Challenge: Drive from Portland to San Francisco without refueling.; Tanner: BMW F10 528i with an 8-speed automatic transmission.; Rutledge: Volkswagen Passat (B4) with a manual and a turbo diesel.; Adam: Ford F350 with four doors and a bi-fuel system and two gas tanks.; Coast Challenge: Whose car will coast the farthest. Starting at the top of a hill, the guys coast in neutral down a hill to see who goes the farthest. The extra weight Tanner and Adam added to the trunk of Rut's Passat helps him gain speed the fastest and coast the farthest. Both pass Adam. Winner: Rutledge; Pee Challenge: Who can last the longest before having to make a pit stop. Adam and Tanner egg Rutledge on and he throws in the towel first. While waiting, Tanner goads Adam into tapping out. Finally Tanner caves while waiting. Rutledge finds the bags of cat litter in the trunk and throws them into the bed of Adam's truck.; Result: Adam and Rutledge race the final stretch in sight of the finish line. Adam runs out of gas leaving Rutledge to take the checkered flag. Tanner arrives in a tow truck.; Reward Race a King of the Hammers truck against extreme kayaker Erik Boomer. Rutledge makes a really hard decision to let The Stig's "backwoods cousin" pilot the hammer truck. The river route is approximately four miles long while the truck route circles up and back before heading back down for a total of eight miles. Winner: "Backwoods Stig" and the Hammers truck
31	5	"The Tractor Challenge"	September 18, 2012	1.72
Adam, Tanner, and Rutledge each choose a very expensive tractor and compete in a series of challenges with them.: Challenge 1: The group race through the Haystore and back. Winner: Tanner; Challenge 2: Reverse a trailer round a circuit, a 5-minute penalty is given for mistakes or cheating. Adam continuously jackknifed his trailer and in the end cheated and went round forwards earning him a time of 11mins 38secs, Tanner fared slightly better until hitting a haystack making his time 13mins 11secs, Rut also jackknifed his trailer and took the penalty of driving around the course forwards. Tanner & Adam however give Rut a 10-minute penalty for giving up too early as well as cheating making his time 13mins 38secs. Winner: Adam; Challenge 3: The 3 presenters are given the job of moving some cattle from one side of the farm to the other. Rut loses his cow and gets disqualified, Adam manages to get his cow to the finish but gets a time of 38mins 58secs, Tanner is partly slowed down on the course but completes with a time of 17mins 10secs. Winner: Tanner; Challenge 4: The 3 presenters are given a cargo which needs moving through town to another farm, the winner being the presenter who managed to move their cargo with the least damage. Tanner was given a barn, Adam a silo & Rutledge a set of saws. Tanner, as predicted, drove too quickly and destroyed his barn resulting in him being disqualified, Adam although drove carefully his cargo was damaged with Tanner ramming him giving Rutledge the win. Winner: Rutledge; Reward: Tanner is given the chance to drive the Lamborghini Aventador which he races against a plane.
32	6	"Monument to Moab"	September 25, 2012	1.83
The hosts travel from Monument Valley to Moab, Utah. Instead of using 4WDs to make the rough (and mostly off-road) trip, they instead use everyday new cars popular with rental car companies. Adam uses a V6 2005 Ford Mustang, Rut a 2009 Toyota Yaris and Tanner, a 2003 Lincoln Town Car. The Lincoln and Toyota make the journey despite getting heavily damaged whilst the Mustang was destroyed after Adam attempted to make it fly off a cliff. The Lincoln was reused in Episode 13 of this Season in a chase where it chased and was damaged by an 'apocalyptic Camry' created by the hosts
33	7	"College Cars"	January 29, 2013	1.57
The guys relive their college days by driving their college cars to Mexico for spring break. Tanner drives a 1991 Eagle Talon TSI, Adam drives a 1982 Cadillac Fleetwood Brougham and Rutledge drives a 1972 Volkswagen Transporter.
34	8	"America's Toughest Car"	February 5, 2013	1.87
The hosts try to find America's toughest car. The cars had to be at least 20 years old and cost no more than $2000. Rutledge chooses a 1990 Volvo 240 DL Estate, Adam drives a 1992 Chevrolet Caprice and Tanner brings a 1987 Toyota Corolla.: Challenge 1: Drag race. Tanner and Adam compete for the lead early while Rutledge lags behind. Adam's Caprice eventually passes Tanner's Corolla for the win, with Rutledge's Volvo finishing far behind. Winner: Adam; Challenge 2: The presenters head to a shooting range to test their cars' reliability and build quality.; Part 1: Each presenter gets to shoot the others' cars three times with a shotgun in order to inflict as much damage as possible. Rutledge starts by shooting Adam's Caprice in the rear door and quarter panel, while Tanner shoots out the windows. Adam shoots the body and windows of Rutledge's Volvo, while Tanner shoots the driver's door handle. Adam and Rutledge both shoot the body and windows of Tanner's Corolla.; Part 2: Explosives are placed in the back seats of each of the cars, with the presenters testing to see which car drives the best afterward. Rutledge's Volvo's leather interior melts, while Adam's Caprice bursts into flames and needs to be put out by the fire crew. Tanner's Corolla has its doors blown open by the explosion. All three of the cars start right up after the explosion, making the challenge a tie. Winner: Tie; Challenge 3: The cars are dropped from a crane from 15 feet in the air to simulate a 25 mph collision. The winner is the car with the least damage. The presenters each get to pick which side the car gets dropped onto. Tanner and Adam choose the passenger side, while Rutledge decides to drop his Volvo on its back, which causes it to fall forward onto its tires. All three of the cars start up and drive away, making the challenge a tie once again. Winner: Tie; Final Challenge: Off-road race course with obstacles and water hazards. The winner is the car that finishes the most laps of the course. To further test the cars, all of the oil is drained from each car prior to the race. Adam and Rutledge begin by smashing into Tanner's Corolla, and Adam spins off the course immediately. Rutledge takes the lead but blows several of his tires, and Tanner passes him. Rutledge's Volvo breaks down shortly after, leaving Tanner's Corolla as the last car standing. Winner: Tanner; Reward: Tanner travels to a military base at Fort Campbell on the Kentucky/Tennessee border, testing the Mercedes-Benz G63 AMG to see if it has retained its military roots. Tanner must travel ten miles through a simulated war zone, pursued by a US Army strike team armed with a drone and helicopters, and must evade them before reaching a safe house. The drone and helicopters find Tanner within two miles, but Tanner loses them by driving through the woods. Four miles to the finish the team catches Tanner again and deploy armored trucks that begin to pursue him. Two more helicopters and a team of 28 ground troops join the chase, blocking off all roads in an attempt to lead Tanner into an ambush. Tanner drives right into the trap and is apprehended by the team. Despite losing the challenge, Tanner concludes that, while the G63 is more concerned with "bling" than durability, it still manages to handle military use.
35	9	"RVs"	February 12, 2013	1.60
The hosts compete who can build the best RV, that is both comfortable and fun to drive. Tanner drives a 1983 Porsche 928 with a rocket on the roof as sleeping accommodation, Adam drives a 1973 Buick Centurion Convertible, with a building modeled after the Flatiron Building and Rutledge drives an extendable 1989 Honda Civic Wagon.: Challenge 1: Race to the nearest campsite. They each have to race to their plots, whoever gets their first will win. Adam and Rut take the same route whereas Tanner takes a Shortcut. In the End Tanner comes first, Adam in Second and Rut in Third. Winner: Tanner On the way to their Next Challenge Tanner is relaxed whereas Adam has near contact with a Bridge and Rut's Ears hurt due to the Honda's cut off Exhaust.; Challenge 2: Drag Race there and back. Each of their creations will race a Newmar Mountain Aire down a drag strip and back. On the way down the drag strip Tanner is in first, Adam in second, Rut in third and the Newmar in last. On the turn due to Tanner has to wait for Rut to move out the way whereas Adam doesn't. Despite this Tanner's Porsche easily beats Adam's Buick which both thrash Rut's Honda and the Newmar. Winner: Tanner; Challenge 3: Easy to withstand winds and get changed in. They each must try an get changed into rain gear inside their RV's while the other two through toys at them through 80mph fans. During Tanner's run his rocket disintegrates meaning that he fails to complete the run into getting dressed into his rain gear and gets a DNF despite getting a time of 1:17. During Adam's run despite the other two throwing the hardest objects, the Flatiron building withstands it and Adam gets dressed into his rain gear and completes the course in 1:44. During Rutledge's run he couldn't even set up his RV, could not put on his rain gear and completed the course in 3:04 meaning that he lost. Winner: Adam; During their way to their next Challenge, Adam has few problems such as tree stuck in the window of his Flatiron Buick, whereas Tanner has to fix his the Rocket on his Porsche and Rut's Honda is stuck in its open position with everything inside wet.: Challenge 4: Tailgate party. See which RV is the most popular by attracting people to their RV's. Tanner attracts some people due to the fact that he serves wine and he has a sports car. Rutledge attracts more people due to the fact he is from the south and understands NASCAR tradition. Adam attracts the fewest people due to him being a New Yorker and not understanding the South. Winner: Rutledge; Final Challenge: Racing around NASCAR Track. Race against three motorhomes for six laps of the NASCAR rally track. Initially, Tanner takes the lead with Adam and Rut fighting for second. However during the second last lap one of the motorhomes knocks into Adam's Buick causing it to role over. Near the finish line on the last lap Tanner's Porsche dies and Rut's Honda manages to complete the course. Winner: Rutledge; In the End: Despite Adam technically building the only RV and Tanner winning two challenges, overall victory was the final challenge meaning that Rutledge was the winner plus since the Porsche died and the Buick rolled over the Honda was the only car still intact Rut concludes by saying that the RV should be based on the Honda Civic Wagon. The guys all leave in the Honda. Overall Winner: Rutledge
36	10	"150 MPH Challenge"	February 19, 2013	2.01
150mph is the speed which cars must reach in order to let them be known as Performance cars. To show this is possible for less than $30,000 they each choose a car and head to the Mojave Desert, Adam chooses the Buick Regal GS, Rutledge takes the Mazda-Speed3 and Tanner uses a Chevrolet Camaro SS. All three reach 150 mph. The guys then compete to see who can reach 150 mph for the least amount of money. Adam brings a 1995 Pontiac Trans-Am which he paid $2600, while Rutledge arrives with a 1994 Infiniti Q45 which he paid $1700 equipped with nitrous for an extra $700 (as the Q45 was drag-limited to 145 mph so the nitrous would be used to gain an extra 5mph), bringing up his total to $2400 and Tanner brings a 1999 Saab 9-3 Viggen for which he paid $3500. Rutledge quotes how both he and Adam have automatic V8's with Rear Wheel Drive whereas Tanner had a manual, Front Wheel Drive 4cylinder and to make Tanner jealous both do a burn out. On the way to the proving grounds it turns out that Tanner's Saab has no flaws at all whereas Adam's Pontiac is starting to decay and Rut's Infiniti is too slow.: Challenge 1: Acceleration. They have to see which car has the fastest acceleration and beat an arrow of fire before it can destroy something precious to their hearts. To ensure that when a car beats the arrow a tripwire near the boxes will be triggered releasing a burst of water to save the possessions. For Adam it is his old collection of records, For Tanner it is his Racing Suit and for Rutledge it is his Honda Civic Owner Manuals. Tanner manages to save his suit due to the Saab's Quick Acceleration whereas Adam's Pontiac and Rut's Infiniti aren't fast enough and the possession are combusted into the atmosphere. Winner: Tanner; Challenge 2: Stability. They have to see which car remains the most stable at speed by fitting very thin tyres to each car and doing a race up to a slalom, turning round and racing all the way back. Initially Rut's car drifts due to its Rear Wheel Drive configuration, Adam's Car door wouldn't close due to its poor build quality and initially Tanner takes the lead despite his car having a lot of understeer. In the end Rut's Infinity spins out and Adam just beats tanner by a millimetre. Winner: Adam; Challenge 3: Concentration under Pressure. They will repeat another slalom course only this time they would have a bowl with rats on their head. Rutledge spins his car many times yet manages to complete the course. Since Adam and Tanner each won a challenge, they cannot be bothered with this one meaning that Rutledge wins. Winner: Rutledge; Final Challenger: 150 mph. They drive to El-Mirage dry lake bed, in order to max their cars. Adam's Pontiac manages to get to 136 mph, Tanner's Saab manages to get to 151 mph and Rut's Infiniti despite him the Nitrous manages to get to only 141 mph. Even though Tanner was the only one who achieved 150 mph, Rutledge fibbed claiming that he also achieved 150mph. Winner: Tanner and Rutledge; Reward: Since Rutledge paid less than Tanner he gets to drive the $2.7 million Bugatti Veyron Grand Sport Vitesse which he need to drive to 150 mph. He adores the power, exquisiteness, quality, price tag, speed and the fact that it's more special than any other car he has driven. The VIP turns out to be Tanner who claims to be the actual winner and takes the Veyron off Rut. Tanner maxes the Veyron on a highway north of Miami where he achieves 201 mph. He and Rut agree that the Veyron is a masterpiece.
37	11	"Best Taxi Challenge"	February 26, 2013	1.60
Taxi driving is essentially the most boring job in the world. For inspiration Tanner looks at the 2012 BMW M5#F10BMW M5 which he describes as the best taxi due to the fact that it is fast and can drift beautifully much to the annoyance of Adam and Rutledge, his passengers. However since the M5 costs $90,000 the guys compete to see who can design the most interesting taxi for less than a BMW M5. Tanner drives a highly modified Scion xB, which has been converted to rear wheel drive for drifting, Rutledge brings a 1984 Chevrolet El Camino with car seats mounted in the bed and Adam brings a Ford E350 Ambulance. They drive to the Las Vegas Motor Speedway.: Challenge 1: A Taxi should have Capacity and speed.. Each Taxi should race to an imaginary family, load them and their luggage into their Taxis and race back to the start line, Fastest Time wins. Adam manages to fit all family and luggage into his Ambu-Taxi and completes the Course in 1:50. Rut's El Camino manages to fit all family and luggage and due to its V8 motor completes the course in 1:10. Tanner's Scion has to make two trips and does not carry all the luggage so completes the course in 2:43. Winner: Rutledge; Challenge 2: A Taxi should have comfort and stability. They must each carry five Las Vegas Drinking Cups three in the front and three in the passenger seat and complete a road course of slaloms, braking and road bumping. Adam's AmbuTaxi saves four cups. Tanner' Scion turns his go into a race and saves two cups. Due to Rut's ElCamino being a convertible and his El Camino being unstable. he loses all five drinks. Winner: Adam; Final Challenge: Which one is most popular. The guys must each drive around town and see who receives the biggest tip. Tanner and Rut warn Adam not to use his Alarms otherwise it's a federal offence. Adam's AmbuTaxi's three stops including some drunk passengers, a magician and his glamorous assistant and a Robert De Niro lookalike. He gains a huge tip by using his alarms Tanner's Scion's three stops include three game nerds, two Mexican women and some Australian male dancers. He gains a huge tip by doing an enormous burnout. Rut's ElCamino three stops include a couple, some exotic female dancers and some party girls. In the end they count up scores, Rut gets $55, Tanner gets $80 and Adam gets $140, however since Adam used his alarms Rut and Tanner disqualify him giving Tanner overall victory, therefore, concluding that the best Taxi is the modified Scion xB. Winner: Tanner; Reward: Tanner gets to drive the McLaren MP4-12C, firstly describing how it ticks all of the supercar boxes. He then describes how unlike any other supercar it rides beautifully. He then describes how it has mind blowing acceleration and is unbelievably fast due to 616hp. On a stretched out runway he achieves 0-60 in 3.0 seconds and achieves a beautiful drift throughout each corner. He then takes it to a racetrack where he find Rutledge and NASCAR Legend Carl Edwards with his 920hp Ford Fusion 99. At first Rut and Carl mock the McLaren compared to the Fusion but Tanner challenges and they agree to a race. Initially due to the Launch Control and through the twisting corners the McLaren takes the lead but on the final lap due to 920hp the Fusion just beats the McLaren. Rut and Carl then change their minds and are blown away by the McLaren and both admit that it is a phenomenal car. Tanner concludes by saying that the McLaren is a Jekyll and Hyde car as it is comfortable, beautiful and well equipped but also underneath the exquisite exterior it is pure race car. He describes it as his favourite Supercar ever.
38	12	"Adam's Show"	March 5, 2013	1.69
Adam designs his own show, supposedly by blackmailing Tanner and Rutledge with embarrassing childhood photographs. He drives the original GT40 for six feet, and a replica for much farther after that. Rutledge arrives in a Ferrari 550 Marinello and the two compete in a series of challenges. Later, the guys play a game of 5 vs 5 American football using demolition derby cars. An air gun is used in the quarterback car, and nets are fitted to two other cars that play the role of receivers.
39	13	"Doomsday Drive"	March 12, 2013	1.72
The guys must build and drive an apocalypse-prepped vehicle through a series of challenges, using a $750,000 MRAP troop transporter as inspiration. They are tasked to build it out of late 1990s Toyota Camry. Adam is in charge of offensive weapons, Rutledge is in charge of defensive weapons, and Tanner is in charge of performance. Tanner adds an exoskeleton and puts the Camry body onto an F-150 chassis. Rutledge adds electrified wires, a smokescreen, and a few other deception measures which are ultimately proven useless, including fake door handles on a door which can't be opened. Adam adds a catapult after realizing his skills with firearms are poor. After the build, which is not shown on screen, the three are tasked with a series of apocalypse challenges, including driving in darkness and evading and damaging a modified Lincoln (from Episode 6 of Season 3) being driven by the Stig.
40	14	"Mammoth Mountain"	March 19, 2013	1.88
Tanner drives the 2012 Range Rover Sport Supercharged, Adam brings the Cadillac Escalade modified by Lingenfelter a drag racer and Rutledge tries the Jeep Grand Cherokee SRT8.: Challenge 1: A race from the meeting place from Pismo Beach to the Gazebo in Paso Robles 40 miles away. Rutledge heads down the flat beach to the main road a 7 mile long journey whilst Tanner takes a 1 mile short cut over the sand dunes Adam follows Tanner since they both know that Tanner always wins when he takes a short cut. However the plan backfires for Adam when he gets bogged down in the deep sand. Adam then tries Rutledge's route to try and at least beat Rutledge. At the finish line Rutledge and Adam finish within minutes of each other, Tanner finishes last. Winner Rutledge; Challenge 2: The three test comfort and ride quality by hosting a picnic for a couple for each presenter as a test of ride quality half of the picnic will be on the roof, Tanner is confident in the Oxford leather upholstery in his car. Tanner's couple get an English assortment of kippers and Stilton and ever the racing driver drives as fast as possible with little regard to the comfort of his passengers. Adam decides that the picnic should be a collection of very sizeable food to show off the size of his Cadillac and boasts the luxury and features i.e. the climate controls in the car as well. Rutledge as always gives his passengers a documentary-like lesson about the Jeep and provides ready-meal-like cheese from a spray can and ''good old fashioned comfort food'' which doesn't go down well with his passengers. The guests are given comment cars and Tanner's food was ''horrible'' the ride was ''terrible'' and Tanner was ''unrefined''. Rutledge was ''annoying'' and they complained that the host ate their food and Adam's guests thought ''things got worse when we got out of the car'' which implies as Adam points out they liked the comfort of the car. Since the test was about the comfort of the car and where Tanner scored 1, Rutledge scored 6 and Adam was rated the highest at 7 it meant he was the winner. Winner Adam.; Challenge 3 A there and back drag race Tanner is concerned that whilst he will win this his car starts having problems like water is coming into the car and his air suspension is acting and Adam points out the Range Rover is a bad choice due to only 12 dealerships across the US and the company is now Indian and will therefore be harder to find a place to repair or buy a new Land Rover. Despite all this Tanner still wins the race, Rut comes in second and Adam far behind. Winner: Tanner Whilst going to Mammoth Mountain all three start to lose performance due to the altitude especially Rutledge who has a naturally aspirated engine and Adam starts to think that he will be in some difficulty in the snow due to the Cadillac's weight and size. The trio also have a race to the hotel they will stay at Tanner once again takes a short cut ignoring the road closed and the deep snow warning signs and gets stuck whilst Adam and Rutledge stick to the main road and win waiting for Tanner who when he arrives thinks that he has won only to find that he is quite the opposite. Adam And Rutledge finally can gloat about Tanner taking a short cut.; Final Challenge: The three prepare to scale Mammoth Mountain and all fit snow tires to their car wheels and they all agree that the one who wins is the overall winner. Tanner blasts into the snow and soon gets stuck Rutledge and Adam manage to pass Tanner Adam manages to quickly get in the lead but soon gets stuck and tactics and slaloms up the Mountain Rutledge gets stuck and goes off to get some coffee and a breakfast. Adam instead of actually using the car to get him to the mountain uses another vehicle to get him to the mountain. Once again Tanner get stuck and in order to win leaves his Range Rover to get to the top of the mountain only to find Adam has made it there before him. However Tanner realises that Adam didn't get his car up the mountain on its own so Tanner declares he is the winner. Rutledge turns up a few minutes later on a snowmobile and they leave the mountain in Adam's Cadillac. In the end Tanner concludes by saying that if you want all grounds you need a Range Rover. Winner: Tanner
41	15	"Minnesota Ice Driving"	March 26, 2013	1.98
The guys tries to find the perfect winter beater for $2000 and arrive in Minnesota. Rutledge chooses a Subaru Legacy GT, Tanner bought a Nissan 300ZX and Adam takes a Chevrolet S-10 Blazer.: Challenge 1: Snow and Stuck. They each must dig their cars out from the snow drift and then drive to the first checkpoint. Despite Rut initially slipping on the snow he manages to get his Subaru out of the snow first and arrives at the checkpoint first. Despite his Nissan being rear wheel drive Tanner manages to get his Nissan out of the snow next and arrives at the checkpoint second. Despite his Blazer being 4WD and having Ground Clearance, Adam fails to get his Blazer out and comes in last place. Winner: Rutledge; On their way to the Proving Grounds Adam's 4WD fails and his Blazer spins out.: Challenge 2: Lap Time. Each car must each complete a lap time of the winter track fastest time wins. Rutledge's Subaru is the only one to completes the course in 1:53.13. Tanner's Nissan gets stuck on the second to last corner giving him a DNF. Adam's Blazer fails to start giving him a DNS meaning he lost again. Winner: Rutledge; Challenge 3: Withstanding Cold. They are each put in a room wearing shorts in their cars where temperatures can go below -40 °C. Rut is the first to abandon his Subaru. Adam is the next to abandon his Blazer. Tanner is the last to abandon his Nissan. Winner: Tanner; Final Challenge. Race between other Winter Beaters. They must race around a track against other Winter Beaters. The winner is the first to cross the line. Since Tanner fitted snow studded tires to his Nissan, the other two put a trailer on the back of his Nissan. In the end Tanner and Rut battle it out whereas Adam sails through. Winner: Adam; Despite Adam's win the producers felt that a car which always breaks down like the Blazer should not be crowned the best winter beater. Despite Rut's two wins they ultimately felt that Tanner should take the prize. Reward: Tanner goes to Colorado to drive the 2012 Bentley Continental GT V8. He is impressed with its ride comfort and V8 engine noise as well as the chassis and 4WD. He is to race it against a snowboarder. He ultimately crosses the line first. He then describes how the Bentley cannot only drive down the ski slope but up it as well. He concludes that the ultimately winter beater is the Bentley Continental GT.
42	16	"Viking Trucks"	April 2, 2013	2.17
The hosts tries to prove to the Icelandic people that American trucks are better than imports by driving up a volcano. Tanner drives a 1979 Ford Bronco, Rutledge drives a 1973 International Scout II and Adam drives a 1984 Chevrolet K30.
