= Top Gear (American TV series) season 6 =

Top Gear
- Season 6
- No. of episodes: 10

Release
- Original network: History Channel
- Original release: April 26 – June 28, 2016

Season chronology
- ← Previous; Season 5

The sixth and final season of Top Gear began airing on History from April 26, 2016 until June 28, 2016. Adam Ferrera, Tanner Foust, Rutledge Wood and The Stig returned as hosts, with ten weekly episodes being broadcast.

== Production ==
Season 6 began filming in late 2015 until early 2016 before it eventually aired on the April 26, 2016. On June 28, 2016, the BBC confirmed that the series had completed its contractual run on the History channel."

== Episodes ==
No. overall	No. in season	Title	Original release date	US viewers (millions)
63	1	"Rubicon Trail"	April 26, 2016	N/A
The hosts photo map the Rubicon Trail, America's most notorious 4x4 route, racing against time to photo map the entire trail before a critical meeting to present their images to Google. Tanner brings a 1985 Ford Bronco which was criticized for being unreliable, Rutledge brings a 1990 Toyota 4Runner which was criticized for flipping over and Adam brings a 1992 Geo Tracker which was criticized for being too small and underpowered. Adam's Tracker suffered no real problems but was severely underpowered and needed help up most hills. Tanner's Bronco briefly shattered its front suspension but otherwise proved to be an all round tough off-roader. Rutledge's 4Runner started off with promise but rolled over and was destroyed by the end of the second day on the trail. Despite this the guys managed to map the entire Rubicon Trail.
64	2	"America vs. Europe"	April 26, 2016	N/A
Tanner, Adam and Rutledge look at which country makes the best car; the guys battle it out in classic sports cars from the countries of their ancestors. Due to Tanner having family origins from Germany he brings a 1985 Porsche 944 which was named Car and Driver's best handling car in America, Due to Adam having family origins from Italy he brings a 1989 Alfa Romeo Spider which was built with passion and due to Rutledge having family origins from the United Kingdom he brings a 1984 Jaguar XJS which was luxurious and had the biggest engine by far. They compete in some challenges to see country makes the best sports cars and deserves no more stereotyping.: Challenge A1: Stability. The cars must have a drag race but they must not put their hands on the steering wheel, put their feet on the brake, the car which travels the longest distance in a straight line wins. Despite getting an initial lead Adam's Alfa veers right and smashes into Tanner's Porsche and Rutledge's Jag causing the Alfa to spin out in front of the Jag resulting in Rutledge and Adam slamming on their brakes. Tanner is the only one who makes it to the bottom of the runway. Despite this all three cars have paint scratches. Winner: Tanner; Challenge A2: Handling. The cars must complete a slalom made out of tyres with the flags of each country, fastest time wins. A five second penalty is given for each tire stack knocked over. Adam's Alfa completes the course in 1:01. Despite having an initial time of 57 seconds, Rutledge's Jag knocks over two sets of tires giving him a total time of 1:07. To prevent Tanner from having an easy win Adam and Rutledge re adjust the flags so that the course is much longer, despite having an initial time of 1:05 Tanner's Porsche missed 5 sets of tires giving him a time of 1:30. Winner: Adam; On the way to the next point, they learn that Tanner's Porsche is in the best shape whereas Adam's Alfa is in rather poor shape and Rutledge's Jag is in worst shape as halfway to the next point it loses its power-steering. Tanner and Adam mock him and start ramming his car. When approaching their next point, they get information that the bars for their challenges will be raised and as a result when they reach a hill they find something special. Three brand new supercars from the countries of their ancestors replacing their classic sports cars. Tanner having family origins from Germany gets a 2016 Porsche 911 GT3, Rutledge having family origins from the United Kingdom gets a 2016 McLaren 650S Spider and Adam having family origins from Itay gets a 2016 Ferrari F12 Berlinetta. On the way they fall in love with the cars agreeing that they should scrap the old challenges and make up new ones to see which country makes the best supercars and deserves no more stereotyping.: Challenge B1: Speed. The cars arrive at the seven mile long Antelope Island Causeway, where each of the cars must accelerate to 130 mph before taking the turn at high speed and then flat out down the final straight. Tanner's Porsche reaches 185 mph. Rutledge's McLaren reaches 165 mph due to him hearing something under the McLaren and slowing down as a result. Adam's Ferrari reaches 188 mph. Winner: Adam; Challenge B2: Looks. On the way to the town in Antelope Island, Adam argues that his Ferrari is not only the fastest but the best looking and when they reach the town they tell the valet parkers to put the best looking car out front in the morning after they've had breakfast since valet parkers are the best judges on cars looks. After breakfast the car the find round front is non other than Rutledge's McLaren. Winner: Rutledge; Challenge B3: Europe vs America. On the final challenge each car must drive round the Antelope Island Circuit while listening to the national anthem of the countries that made their cars and once each anthem finishes they must stop. To set the benchmark The Stig drives a Dodge Viper ACR while an Uncle Sam plays the American National Anthem on a guitar and stop having complete 1 and 3/4 of a lap. For the hosts they are given an Opera Woman. Rutledge's McLaren only completes just over 3/4 of a lap while the woman sings the British National Anthem. Adam's Ferrari too completes just over 3/4 of a lap while the woman sings the Italian National Anthem. Tanner's Porsche completes just under 1 and 3/4 of a lap while the woman sings the German National Anthem. Winner: Tanner; In the End: Despite their victories, America won the final challenge overall. Despite this the hosts agree that Europe still makes the best cars and although they cannot agree on which country makes the best agree that the Ferrari, McLaren and Porsche are each individuals favorite cars and that there is no longer and stereotyping for European cars. Overall Winner: Tie
65	3	"24 Hours of Budget Racing"	May 3, 2016	N/A
To prove anyone can race on a budget, the guys must compete in a grueling 24-hour endurance race in which every car costs less than $500. To decide which car they must use they each buy a car which costs less than $500. The car which wins is the car they will use for racing whereas the losing cars will be destroyed. Rutledge picks a 1986 Nissan 720 with a top ladder rack due to its previous owner being a gardener, Tanner chooses a 1993 Volkswagen Golf with an air scoop, rear spoiler and fake GTI badges due to its previous owner being a keen driver and Adam buys a 1996 Ford Crown Victoria with a front brush guard due to its previous owner being a policeman.: Challenge 1: Top Speed. In auto racing top speed is crucial so the guys head to an abandoned highway to find out which car is the fastest. Adam's Crown Vic reaches 92.4 mph. Rutledge's Nissan reaches 78.6 mph. Tanner's Golf reaches 80 mph. Winner: Adam; Challenge 2: Durability and Handling. In 24-hour endurance racing cars must deal with having debris thrown at them and being rammed by other cars when racing. To see which car best copes with these types of environment the guys head to a local quarry where each car will navigate round a course while first being pounded by rock-filled punching bags, then over gravel-filled bumps before completing a hairpin turn, which each car will be covered in maple syrup, packing chips, and feathers. Fastest time wins. Tanner's Golf completes the course in 1:49, Rutledge's Nissan completes the course in 1:28 and Adam's Crown Vic completes the course in 1:21. Winner: Adam; In the End: Due to its two victories Adam's Crown Vic is the car the guys will use in the race. Meanwhile Rutledge's Nissan is dropped on Tanner's Golf and both are crushed between two tractors. Overall Winner: Adam Review: While Adam and Rutledge prep the Crown Vic for Racing. Tanner is sent to test his skills of endurance racing by being sent to Sweden to drive the brand new Koenigsegg One:1 to see if he can go faster than his previous speed record of 223 mph. He describes how they managed to get simultaneous horsepower to kg and is deeply impressed with the acceleration and grip from the car. Finally he arrives at the airport and maxes the Koenigsegg to 225 mph. Impressed with all this, Tanner concludes the One:1 is an absolute masterpiece. Final Challenge: When arriving at Sonoma Raceway in California, Tanner finds that Adam and Rutledge have ruined the Crown Vic by turning it into a mobile lemonade stand. This proves to be a challenge as with the extra weight the Crown Vic is underpowered and fades through its breaks resulting in Adam followed by Rutledge ending up in last place when driving the car. Tanner however despite being disqualified when hitting another vehicle manages to make up to 145th place by the end of the first day and 59 laps in total. By the next day the guys find out that The Stig had removed the lemon stand and tightened the brakes to make the Crown Vic a better racer. However despite this it only manages to complete 20 more laps before the Crown Vic's engine stops running properly. Rutledge discovers upon the Crown Vic's return to the pit via tow truck that two connecting rods for the pistons had broken with one rod liberating itself from inside the engine. Rutledge keeps this piece as a memento to their amazing budget racing experience. Despite the early retirement the guys were happy to compete in budget racing.
66	4	"Cars for Life"	May 10, 2016	N/A
While average Americans own eight different cars during their lifetimes, Tanner, Adam and Rutledge pick one vehicle from their birth year that excels at every stage of life from birth to death. Tanner picks a 1973 Datsun 240Z owing to his mum crashing one when he was two, Rutledge chooses a 1980 Dodge Tradesman owing to his second car being a van and Adam buys a 1966 Cadillac Fleetwood Brougham owing to him learning in a Cadillac. The guys compete in a number of challenges to see which car is best.: Challenge 1: Driving Test. The first test of life is the driving test. The guys must drive around a typical driving course which includes parked vehicle, stop signs and cones. While they navigate round the course another presenter will ride shotgun and ask them driving test questions, each time a question is answered wrong or an obstacle is hit there is a 10 second penalty. Fastest Time Wins. Adam's Fleetwood completes the course in 1:48 but he gets three questions wrong and hits two obstacles resulting in a total time of 2:38. Despite getting all the questions correct Rutledge's Tradesman completes the course in 2:46 but he hits two obstacles giving him a time of 3:06. Tanner's Datsun fails to start so he gets of the cars in the obstacle course, a police Crown Victoria, and despite not hitting any obstacles, he is disqualified as he didn't answer any questions and didn't use his Datsun. Winner: Adam; On the way to their next Challenge Adam's Fleetwood and Rutledge's Tradesman manage to start and leave whereas Tanner's Datsun fails to start. Eventually he meets them at the next meeting point.: Challenge 2: Parenthood. The second test of life is parenthood. The guys must chauffeur three plastic pregnant women to a nearby hospital within 30 minutes collecting diapers and maternity bras on the way. Each car is fitted with exploding Baby food deemed to explode after 30mins to improvise of babies being born. Tanner's Datsun fails to start again and in trying to fix it, his time runs out and he gets covered in baby food. Adam manages to get the two items but soon after placing them in his Fleetwood and driving a few yards, his time run out and he gets covered in baby food. Rutledge's Tradesman is the only one to make it to the hospital just in time before he too gets covered in baby food. Winner: Rutledge; Tanner's Datsun doesn't even make it to the hospital, instead he takes a rented out 2015 Chrysler 200 claiming that he has a mechanic to fix the car.: Challenge 3: Mid Life Crisis.The third test of being exposed to cars is the Mid Life Crisis where people choose younger models. So for the next three challenges the guys trade their old cars for three of the newest fastest American Saloons. Adam selects a 2016 Cadillac CTS-V, Rutledge takes a 2016 Dodge Charger Hellcat and Tanner receives a 2016 Tesla Model S P90D. On the way to the first challenge they all max their cars with the Tesla being the quickest.; Mini-challenge 1: Drag Race. The guys arrive at an airport and agree to have a drag race, despite Tanner wanting a 0-100-0 test and Rutledge wanting a Top Speed Test. Initially Tanner's Tesla gets the quickest start however near the end it hits its speed limit causing Rutledge's Hellcat to overtake. In the end Rutledge's Hellcat crosses the line first, Tanner's Tesla second and Adam's Cadillac last. Winner: Rutledge; On the way to the next mini challenge Tanner tests the automotive cruise control of the Tesla by allowing Rutledge's Hellcat and Adam's Cadillac to overtake and brake sharply.: Mini-challenge 2: Strength. The guys arrive at a Caterpillar Tractor yard to see which car is the strongest by doing a Tug of War. Due to Tanner's Tesla not having tow hook or any towing capacity he is the referee for Cadillac vs Hellcat. Despite having less power and less torque, Adam's Cadillac eventually out matches Rutledge's Hellcat. Winner: Adam; Due to Tanner not being able to take part in the previous challenge he decides to see if how good the Tesla is at drifting but finds it difficult to drift due to its electronic modes. He then switches it for Rutledge's Hellcat and despite nearly hitting a tractor he enjoys it thoroughly. Tanner then admits that while in his mind the Tesla is still the best car his and Rutledge's favourite car of the three is the Hellcat. Adam however sticks by his Cadillac.: Mini-challenge 3: Speed laps. to see which car is the fastest round the track, The Stig takes each saloon round a track to see which is the fastest. Adam's Cadillac laps the quickest followed by Tanner's Tesla with Rutledge's Hellcat coming in last place. Winner: Adam; After this challenge the guys switch back to their older cars for the last couple of challenges.: Challenge 4: Old age. The fourth test of being exposed to cars is Old Age. The guys must drive 3 laps of Kern County Raceway Park while having the impediments of an Elderly individual. Fastest Time wins. Rutledge's Tradesman completes the course in 3:03. Adam's Fleetwood completes the course in 2:37. Tanner's Datsun manages to start and he actually complete the course in 2:26 Winner: Tanner; Tanner's Datsun lost some oil at the end and could not start after this challenge.: Final Challenge: Death. The final test of life is Death. The guys must lap a simple dirt track and after one minute The Stig chases them down in his Lincoln Hearse acting as death, trying to knock each car of the track, the last car standing will be the one which cheats death. Initially both Adam's Fleetwood and Rutledge's Tradesman with the latter taking an early lead, However eventually Tanner's Datsun starts and overtakes Adam and Rutledge, just in time before The Stig starts chasing them. However after one lap Tanner's Datsun loses its power and is overtaken by Adam's Fleetwood and Rutledge's Tradesman, resulting in his Car being hit by the Stig's Hearse first. Adam's Fleetwood eventually overtakes Rutledge's Tradesman and he starts to slide prevent Rutledge overtaking resulting in his Van being hit by the Stig's Hearse. Adam's Fleetwood is the car which cheats death. Winner: Adam; In the End: Rutledge and Adam agree that the Datsun is the worst pick as it hardly took place in most of the challenges. Despite Rutledge claiming that his Tradesman won the most relevant challenge, Adam points out that his Fleetwood never lost a challenge and won the most Challenges making it the ultimate car for life. As well as this despite Rutledge arguing that both he and Tanner fell in love with the Hellcat, Adam points out that the CTS-V won the most challenges of the three saloons making it the best midlife crisis Saloon arguing that Cadillac is the best car company for life. As Rutledge and Adam leave the track in the Tradesman and the Fleetwood, Tanner's Datsun fails to start once again. Overall Winner: Adam
67	5	"Military Might"	May 17, 2016	N/A
Many vehicles originally designed for civilian use are now being used in the military which can survive military combat, however what new civilian vehicle can best survive military combat. To find out the guys pick their favourites and meet them in a desert near the Fort Irwin National Training Center. Rutledge picks a 2016 Ram Power Wagon due to it being a descendant of the WC Series Pickup used in World War II, Adam selects a 2016 Jeep Willys Wheeler Edition due it being a descendant of the Willys Jeep also used in World War II and Tanner chooses a 2016 Subaru WRX STI due to its rally pedigree. Upon heading off to their first challenge they are captured by terrorists but saved by the 11th Armored Cavalry Regiment where the sergeant major directs them to their first challenge.: Challenge 1: Speed and Capability. A military vehicle must cover all types of ground quickly. to see which vehicle best suits this environment they must each compete in a rocky obstacle course and must try to beat a time set by a M1A1 SA Tank. Fastest time wins. The Tank completes the course in 4:27 which none of the others beat. Adam's Jeep completes 4:40. Due to Tanner's Subaru having low ground clearance he has to take a longer route and completes the course in 4:53. Rutledge's Ram completes the course in 4:33. Winner: Rutledge; Challenge 2: Agility and Survivability. Evasive Manoeuvres are essential in military vehicles. to see which vehicle best they must each drive through a Mock City from the west side to the east side filled with smoke to represent the safe zone. When travelling through the city snipers will be firing at each of the cars. The one with the fewest shots wins. Despite trying to hide Adam's Jeep gets 27 shots. Due to being light and agile Tanner's Subaru only gets 12 shots. Owing to its size Rutledge's Ram gets 14 shots. Winner: Tanner; Race: to see what is the best current military vehicle Tanner chooses his own 2016 XP Turbo 1000 which Adam and Rutledge decide to race against the Tank from earlier. Each vehicle must knock out 10 targets and return to the start line, first vehicle which returns wins. Adam decides to use the Tank with the military. whereas Rutledge is forced to ride shotgun with Tanner in the XP. Despite the XP knocking out all the targets, Adam and the military return to the start line first. However after the race Tanner and Rutledge return to the hotel using the XP whereas Adam is abandoned by the military. Race Winners: Adam and The Military; Final Challenge: Rescue Mission. To determine which civilian vehicle is best for the military the guys must camouflage their vehicle and take part in a rescue mission. None of requirements are met as Adam Jeep was covered in fruit and vegetables rather than camouflage, Rutlegde's Ram is painted bright pink rather than stealth pink and Tanner's Subaru is wrapped in Minecraft rather than Arctic Camouflage. Their mission is to rescue an abandoned soldier whose Humvee had failed from a bunch of Terrorists. Owing to its speed Tanner's Subaru would drop off troops to engage the terrorists in the building. Owing to its strength Rutledge's Ram would tow away the Humvee. Owing to its off road capabilities Adam's Jeep would rescue the soldier and take him to a nearby helicopter. The vehicle which performs its task best would win. The guys manage to successfully save the soldier. In the end Rutledge's Ram performed brilliantly and succeeded at all its tasks. Despite Tanner's Subaru getting the soldiers quickly to the drop off point its loud engine meant that they lost the surprise. Adam's Jeep proved to be the worst as it lacked power and size and Adam lacked humanity when rescuing the soldier. Winner: Rutledge; In the End: Adam's Jeep proved to be the worst pick as it lost most of the challenges and was the worst in the rescue mission. Tanner's Subaru was a surprise for the military due to its agility however its low ground clearance and loud engine were not suitable for the military. Rutledge's Ram proved to be a solid all-round choice covering all types of terrain and performing exceptionally at its mission. Owing to his victory Rutledge decides to prank Tanner by using the Tank to blow up a fake Subaru. Overall Winner: Rutledge
68	6	"American Aftermarket"	May 24, 2016	N/A
America loves fast cars particularly muscle cars so the guys drive three iconic American muscle cars with Tanner bringing a 2015 Ford Mustang GT with 435hp, Adam taking a 2015 Chevrolet Camaro SS 1LE with 428hp and Rutledge selecting a Dodge Challenger R/T Scat Pack with 485hp. However many americans tune their cars with after-market upgrades to go even faster so to see which is best the guys swap their standard cars for three aftermarket upgraded muscle cars at Las Vegas Motor Speedway to see if the upgrades are worth the cost. Tanner chooses a 2015 Saleen 302 Black Label Mustang with 730hp and costing $73,000, Adam selects a 2015 Hennessey Camaro Z/28 with 667hp and costing $98,000 and Rutledge selects a 2015 Petty Challenger with 1000hp and costing $100,000. The guys compete in a number of challenges to see which aftermarket muscle car is best.: Challenge 1: Lap Times. In adding upgrades aftermarket muscle cars should be faster than the standard cars. to see which car is best suited to tracks the guys must each compete in a two lap course starting with the standard car and then switching to the after market. Fastest time wins. Rutledge's Challengers complete the overall course in 2:55, (1:12 for the R/T, 1:06 for the Petty, 0:37 for fitting the Racing Harnesses of the Petty). Tanner's Mustangs complete the course in 2:33 (1:04 for the GT, 1:01 for the Saleen, 0:28 for Turning around the Saleen). Adam's Camaro's complete the course in 3:03 (1:16 for the SS, 1:14 for the Hennessey, 0:33 for running to the Hennessey). Winner: Tanner; Challenge 2: Horsepower. Aftermarket Muscle Cars have ridiculous amount of horsepower but can it be managed. To find out the Guys head to a long Strip and must each write their names in Rubber. Whoever finishes first wins. Despite Tanner having written his name the clearest in his Saleen, Rutledge finished first in his Petty. Adam on the other hand failed to write his name in the Hennessey. Winner: Rutledge; Challenge 3: America vs Europe. Aftermarket Muscle cars cost about the same as European sports cars but which is faster. To find out the guys head to a drag strip to drag race their cars against a Porsche 911 Carrera S over a 1/4 mile. Fastest to the 1/4 mile wins. All three beat the Porsche but set different times. Tanner's Saleen sets a time of 12.62. Adam's Henessey sets a time of 12.46. Rutledge's Petty sets a time of 12.07. Winner: Rutledge; Challenge 4: Braking. Muscle cars are known for racing between lights. However Aftermarket ones should also stop better. So when entering Las Vegas the guys close down a street and do a 0-60-0 race. First one to stop wins. Tanner's Saleen comes in First, Adam's Hennessey in Second and Rutledge's Petty in Last. Winner: Tanner.; Final Challenge: Speed. Aftermarket Muscle Cars should be fast. to see which car is the fastest the guys head out to the Eldorado Dry Lake Bed and must each go as fast as possible over 3 miles while wearing a blind fold. Fastest speed wins. On his first run Rutledge nearly crashes into his co hosts and on his second run his Petty reaches 104mph. Despite being more straight Adam's Hennessey only reaches 80mph. Despite coming of the Track Tanner's Saleen reaches 107mph. Winner: Tanner; In the End: All three guys agree that the after market upgrades are worth the extra cost. However Tanner points out that due to the number of challenges won put the Saleen in first, Petty in second and Hennessey in last making the Saleen the best Aftermarket Muscle Car. Overall Winner: Tanner Reward: Tanner gets to drive the custom built $534,000 Equus Baas 770 where only 17 have been built in total. He is impressed with the styling, speed and handling but states that for the same amount of money there are faster and better cars. He concludes that the Equus is simply a toy for rich people to show off instead of traditional Ferraris and Lamborghinis, claims it to be the best muscle car ever and recommends the remaining 10 to be bought immediately.
69	7	"Postal"	June 7, 2016	N/A
The U.S. Postal Service is one of the oldest, largest and most efficient civilian organisations asks for proposals to build a new delivery vehicle to replace its classic postal truck, The LLV. Instead of choosing brand new cars the guys pick used cars which they the U.S. can replace the LLV with. Adam buys a 1998 Lincoln Town Car Executive Hearse due to its V8 and size, Rutledge chooses a 2003 Honda Element due to its storage capacity and 4 wheel drive and Tanner buys a 1994 Mitsubishi 3000GT VR4 due to its speed and traction but ads a trailer at the back to carry mail. The guys compete in a number of challenges to see which car is best suited to live up to the expectation of the LLV. When they arrive Adam purposely bumps into Tanner.: Challenge 1: Space and Speed. Postal vehicle need to complete their routes in quick times while carrying a lot of mail. to see which car best suits these challenges the guys head to a closed residential street where they must complete a slalom while picking up mail and then slalom back in reverse to start line. However there will be time penalties for obstacles hit, packages left behind and not closing mail doors. Fastest time wins. Rutledge's Element initially completed the course in 5:39 but had penalties of leaving flags up, curbing and leaving a mailbox open. Adam's Hearse initially completed the course in 7:59 but had penalties due to leaving a flag up, crashed into a mailbox and stealing one. Tanner's Mitsubishi initially completed the course in 7:59 but had letters scattered across the lawn. In the end they all achieve a total time of 8:59. Winner: Tie; Having Collected all the mail the guys decide to see which car can get through the slalom the quickest. Tanner's Mitsubishi comes in first but Adam's Hearse knocks into his trailer damaging both cars with Rutledge's Element coming in last unscathed. Despite Tanner claiming victory they all agree to cancel the challenge as it was pointless.: Challenge 2: Refinement and Comfort. Postal vehicles need to carry their loads and keep them clean and refined no matter how hard the surface. The guys head to a rocky road where they must each complete a course while carrying bottles of vinegar mixed with baking soda. Fastest time wins. If the glass broke or liquid slosh there will be penalties. Adam's Hearse completes the course in 3:47 but some liquid sloshed out giving him a 10 second penalty and a total time of 3:57. Tanner initially tried to go slow in his Mitsubishi but lost patience and put his foot down resulting in all glass smashing in the trailer resulting in his total time being 6:23 despite initially being 3:23. Despite adding more baking soda do his load Rutledge's Element was so smooth that he gained no penalties nor did he lose any liquid completing the course in 3:51. Winner: Rutledge; Challenge 3: Durability and Weather Conditions. All mailmen can complete their rounds no matter how difficult the weather conditions. So the guys head to an all weather test centre to manoeuvre a course beginning with picking up and then delivering mail while dealing with different weather conditions of Snow, Rail and Wind. However penalties are added for damaged or undelivered mail. Fastest time wins. Rutledge's Element completes the course in 7:10 but with zero penalties. Tanner's Mitsubishi initially completes the course in 4:29 however due to undelivered and ruined mail he gets penalties giving him a total time of 14:30. Adam's Hearse completes the course 8:53 with zero penalties. Winner: Rutledge; After the challenge Adam admits he needs to modify his Hearse and Rutledge admits he too needs to modify his Element however Tanner states his Mitsubishi is perfect and needs zero modifications.: Race: While his co-hosts modify their cars Tanner reviews the brand new 2016 Shelby Mustang GT350. He is impressed with its speed, styling, handling, comfort, noise and charm stating it to be the greatest Mustang since the P-51 Mustang. Since the challenge is about post Tanner agrees to race a cyclist called Josh Boothby around a course in Long Beach, California picking up mail at one point and then delivering it to a postal box at the top of Car Park. Despite getting initially ahead, due to the speed limit in a park and the latter taking an elevator, Tanner's Shelby loses the race to Josh with his bicycle. Both Tanner and Josh then show off the capabilities of each vehicle with Tanner doing burnouts and Josh doing swings. Tanner still states that the Shelby GT350 is the best ever Mustang ever. Race Winner: Josh Boothby; When arriving at the final challenge in his Mitsubishi Tanner finds that Rutledge converted his Element to right hand drive due to this making Mail deliveries and pick ups quicker, one of the benefits of the LLV and Adam fitted a gun to his Hearse to fire letters into people's mailboxes.: Final Challenge: Delivery Service. The postal service is well known for making deliveries as quickly as possible so the guys arrive at an abandoned street where they must deliver the correct mail to the correct six houses in the shortest time. Penalties are added for incorrect mail or knocking down mail boxes. to see definitely which car is best suited for mail transport the guys must beat the time set by the Stig in an LLV. The Stig's LLV delivers all the letters to the correct houses and completes the course 2:37. Tanner's Mitsubishi completes the course in 5:10 but he knocked over a mail box and on the last corner lost his trailer when he cornered too hard resulting in his trailer tipping over and crashing into an abandoned play area, not to mention his Mitsubishi overheated its turbos. Rutledge's Element completed the course in 2:43 with no penalties. Adam's Hearse failed badly as his gun knocked over every single mailbox resulting in him gaining so many penalties that he lost so much time not to mention his Hearse was structurally dented. Winner: Rutledge; In the End: Both Adam and Tanner were declared as the two losers as both the Hearse and the Mitsubishi failed to cope with weather conditions and both had catastrophic ways of delivering mail, in the form of Tanner's Trailer and Adam's Gun, not to mention their cars were both damaged externally and internally. Rutledge's Element however had won the most challenges, technically didn't lose one and wasn't damaged at all. Therefore the Honda Element is decided the best postal vehicle and the keys are handed to the Stig to take it to U.S. Postal Headquarters to base their new vehicle off the Element. Rutledge in the meantime leaves the abandoned street in the LLV since he had always wanted one and because he won, with Adam and Tanner, the two losers riding shotgun. Overall Winner: Rutledge
70	8	"Winter Drop Top"	June 14, 2016	N/A
In the early days almost all cars were convertibles however in 1905 cars were introduced with roofs. Nowadays convertible cars are seen as pointless due to the fact that they can only be driven in sunny weather and are not as fast or as strong as hard top cars. To prove that convertibles can be driven all year, the guys head to Rocky Mountains in Steamboat Springs, Colorado, a place where Tanner grew up in, to test brand new all-wheel drive high performance convertibles. Adam takes a 2016 Jaguar F Type R AWD Convertible due to its beauty and power, Rutledge brings a 2016 BMW 650i xDrive Convertible due to its size and technology, and Tanner, arriving on a ski, picks a 2016 Porsche 911 Turbo 4WD Convertible due to its handling and speed. The guys compete in a number of challenges to see which high performance All Wheel Drive convertible is best.: Challenge 1: Speed. A high performance AWD convertible should waste little time in taking its roof down and have great performance. To see which car performs the best they must each race down to a sign and race back starting with the roofs up and finishing with the roofs down. Adam's Jag takes 12 seconds to take down the roof whereas Tanner's Porsche takes 14 seconds with both cars not going higher than 30mph whereas Rutledge's BMW has the longest roof time can only average this at speeds no higher than 25mph. Adam starts by taking the roof down in his Jag then racing forth and back completing the course in 1:17. Tanner races to one end then upon turning around takes the roof off his Porsche and then races back down completing the course in 1:10. Rutledge plans to run back and forth and take the roof down near the end of the race however the BMW's system refuses to take the roof down at any temperature lower than 14°C. Later when the temperature increases his roof does eventually come down and all three cars must keep their roofs down for the next challenges. Winner: Tanner; Challenge 2: Handling. When taking the roof off a high performance AWD car rigidity is lost. To see which car handles the best the guys head to an ice track used by the Bridgestone Winter Driving School, a place where Tanner taught skilled driving for 8 years. The guys must complete a lap of an ice track, fastest time wins. Rutledge's BMW has trouble with traction, spins out briefly and gives him a time of 2:50. Adam's Jag appears to be slower but actually completes the course in 1:53. Due to Tanner's experience he must do a Le Mans Style Start and run to his Porsche before setting off yet despite this he completes the course in 1:48. Winner: Tanner; Challenge 3: Grip and Visibility. The purpose of AWD in a high performance convertible is to maintain grip on loose surfaces and to see clearly through the wind shield. to see which car has the best grip the guys must each play a game of ice hockey using their cars starting at the goal, collecting the puck, pass through each defender and score the puck in the goal. Fastest time wins. Tanner's Porsche maintains excellent grip and manages to complete the course in 3:41. Rutledge's BMW performs poorly due to its lack of traction and long bonnet resulting in it completing the course in 3:59. Adam's Jag performs well but after passing through the defenders he places the puck in his Jag and manages to complete the course in 3:37. Winner Adam; Final Challenge: All Round. A high performance AWD car must cope in any condition what ever the weather many speed and comfort. To see which car best performs and named the overall winner, the guys head to a Rodeo Arena where they will use their cars to carry a cowboy named Jason round the barrels and ends when he lasoos a steer. Fastest Time Wins. Adam's Jag performs very well by maintaining grip and composure and completing the course in 51 seconds. Tanner's Porsche performs excellently by having excellent grip and completing the course in 38 seconds. Rutledge's BMW performs poorly once again losing traction, spinning several times resulting in Jason only just catching the steer completing the course in 2:00. Winner: Tanner; In the End: Tanner, Adam and reluctantly Rutledge agree that the BMW was the worst as its four wheel drive was deeply flawed and it was too soft and soggy to deal with snow. They did agree that Jag performed very well in all conditions, looked the best and handled well in all conditions. However they all agreed that the Porsche performed excellently in all weather conditions and in Tanner's mind was more fun in snow than on dry tarmac. Overall Winner: Tanner Reward/Punishment: Due to Tanner's victory he gets to race his Porsche against the loser, Rutledge, who must use a Dog Sled. On his initial practice run with his co-instructor Chris, Rutledge falls off his Dog Sled and has to be rescued by chris. After this Rutledge puts on extra clothing. The race takes place from the training centre across Lake Catamount to the other side at a bar which marks the finishing Point. Tanner's Porsche will take the longer route with more turns on the road 8 miles long whereas Rutledge's Dog Sled will take the direct route across Lake Catamount only 2 miles long. Despite getting an initial early lead with dog sled Tanner catches up to Rutledge and on the last Bend Rutledge falls off the dog sled. Tanner manages to win the race with the dogs and the sled following. Rutledge eventually arrives cold and miserable but Tanner refuses to give him arise as Rutledge could have had anything from the Dogs sled which he doesn't want to ruin the Porsche so instead gives him a hand warmer instead before departing in his new favourite car leaving Rutledge to find a bar and Taxi. Race Winner: Tanner
71	9	"City Saviors"	June 21, 2016	N/A
With more than 80% of Americans living in cities, the guys navigate the concrete jungle of Los Angeles to find the perfect city car that's thrilling to drive, practical, nimble, tough and reliable. Tanner picks a 2016 Jeep Renegade due to its off-road heritage and practicality, Adam chooses a 2016 BMW i3 due to its small size and electric motor and Rutledge selects a 2016 Scion FR-S due to its handling, speed and the fact he raced one around a city. The guys compete in a number of challenges to see which one of their different cars best suits the City Environment.: Challenge 1: Quietness and Maneuverability. A good city car must be discrete so the guys head to the Los Angeles Convention Center to play a game of Automotive Hide and Seek whereby one car is given a 30 second head start must travel around the city and try and evade being spotted by the two other cars which will try and find the first car. Longest Time Wins. Rutledge's Scion has an evasive time of 1:41 without being seen but is found behind some boxes. Adam's BMW has an evasive time of 2:03 before . Tanner's Jeep performed badly as he had an evasive time of 1:27 and got found stuck on some stairs which scraped the underside of his Jeep leaving him stuck and his Co-Hosts abandoning him. He later regroups with them. Winner: Adam; Challenge 2: Toughness and Handling. A good city car must handle all types of conditions so the guys head to an abandoned lot to have a race around the abandoned lot. First one to cross the finish line wins. Despite Tanner getting an Early lead Adam blocks him out. In the end Rutledge's Scion crosses the finish line first, followed by Adam's BMW with Tanner's Jeep coming in Last Place again. Winner: Rutledge; Challenge 3: Size and Parking. A good city car must be able to park in all types of areas so the guys head to an abandoned Car Park where they must try and complete all types of parking, forward parking, parallel parking and swivel parking. Fastest time wins. However there will be a 10 second penalty for knocking into other cars by which case water will be sprayed onto paper which turns pink when wet. Adam's BMW initially gets a time of 3:35 but gets a penalty when failing on the Parallel Parking giving him a total time of 3:45. Tanner's Jeep gets no penalties and completes the course in 2:21. Rutledge's Scion initially gets a time of 2:26 but due to failing on the Forward and Swivel Parking gives him a total time of 2:46. Winner: Tanner; Final Challenge: Speed and Practicality. To ultimately see which is the best city car, it must carry a lot of loads in a short period of time, so the guys head to an abandoned warehouse unit where they must each race their cars between two posts while picking up and delivering the following items: (A Large Teddy Bear, A Television, A Lamp and a Mattress). Fastest Time Wins. However there will be penalties for any damaged items. Adam's BMW gets zero penalties and completes the course in 4:01. Rutledge's Scion gets no penalties and completes the course in 3:54. Tanner's Jeep gets a 5 second penalty and completes the course 5:05. Winner: Rutledge; In The End: Adam, Rutledge and reluctantly Tanner agree that the Jeep was the worst as it lost most of the challenges and wasn't even a proper Jeep. Despite Adam arguing about the BMW being the best, Tanner and Rutledge claim that its high price is too much for a city car. They all agree that the Scion was the best as it is the most desirable, the best value for money, won most of the challenges and didn't lose a challenge. Overall Winner: Rutledge Reward/Race: Rutledge gets to drive the ultimate city car, the 2016 Alfa Romeo 4C Spider. He adores the lightweight due to the Carbon-Fibre Tub, the Power from its 4cylinder Engine, the handling, the looks and the fact it was built with passion. Rutledge states that he immediately prefers the Alfa to his Scion as it is more fun to drive, faster and built with Passion rather than Science. However due to not accepting that he lost, Tanner decides to race Rutledge across Los Angeles to Venice Piers. Adam shotgunned with Rutledge will drive the Alfa while Tanner rides on a 2016 HPC Revolution and The Stig will take Public Transport. Whoever makes it to the Piers first wins. Initially Tanner and the Stig get to an early lead with no delays while Adam and Rutledge have to deal with Traffic, Stop Lights and the Cops. Despite this Adam and Rutledge's Alfa make it first to the Piers followed by Tanner's Bike. The Stig on the other hand got distracted by a Ferrari Dealer in Los Angeles yet could not enter due to it being closed. Rutledge claims the Alfa to be the ultimate City Car. Race Winner: Rutledge and Adam
72	10	"Cuba"	June 28, 2016	N/A
Tanner, Adam and Rutledge head to Cuba, where they test and modify three classic American cars; the guys attempt to make history by competing in a government-sanctioned drag race.
