= Top Gear (American TV series) season 2 =

Top Gear
- Season 2
- No. of episodes: 16

Release
- Original network: History Channel
- Original release: July 24, 2011 – April 3, 2012

Season chronology
- ← Previous; Season 1 Next → Season 3

The second season of Top Gear began airing on History from July 24, 2011, until April 3, 2012. Adam Ferrera, Tanner Foust, Rutledge Wood and The Stig returned as hosts, with the season consisting of sixteen episodes, which aired on a weekly basis. This was the final season to include car reviews and the Power laps and Big Star, Small Car segment, as they were discarded from the programme before the third season.

== Production ==
Commenting on the second season renewal, UK show host Jeremy Clarkson noted, "Top Gear is our baby so you can understand why Hammond, May and I were anxious about passing it on to the presenters of the US show. We needn’t have worried because Top Gear is clearly in safe hands, even if they do insist on speaking in those stupid accents. Watching an episode from series 1 with Richard and James, we found ourselves in a genuinely heated debate about which of the presenters’ cars was best. We were just three ordinary chaps watching a car show and loving it, which is exactly what Top Gear should be. Bring on series 2." The second season was also the first to include sixteen episodes, as the previous season aired ten.

== Episodes ==
No. overall	No. in season	Title	Original release date	US viewers (millions)
11	1	"Texas"	July 24, 2011	1.96
Feature: Tanner, Rutledge and Adam wrangle, haul and race their way across Texas in a crazy attempt to find an alternative to the pickup with 2 doors. The catch is that they only get $2000 to buy a car. Adam chooses a 1975 Ford Maverick and claims it is related to the Ford Ranchero. Tanner chooses the BMW 325e and says it has more technology than a 2011 pick-up. Rutlege chooses a 1991 Mazda Miata and he claims that it is the perfect replacement for a truck.: Challenge 1: Cattle Drive. All three hosts must lead and protect a large herd of cattle by taking point. They're not allowed to lose any of them. There's no clear winner, but Adam claims victory due to the steers mostly following his Maverick.; Challenge 2: Manure hauling. Each host modifies his car to carry a huge load of fertilizer (cow manure). The biggest load wins. Adam cuts off the roof of his Maverick, turning it into a crude version of the Ranchero. Rutledge puts the top down on his Miata and is nearly buried beneath his load. Tanner puts plastic buckets on the roof, sides and front of his BMW. Despite this, he ends up with the lightest load. Winner: Adam; Challenge 3: Monster Truck Racing. All three cars are modified with monster truck tires and suspension and are raced around a track. Adam takes the early lead but his engine overheats and burns out. Rutledge actually loses a wheel, leaving Tanner to finish the race. Winner: Tanner
12	2	"First Cars"	July 31, 2011	2.12
Guests: Rick Harrison and Chumlee Challenge: Tanner, Rutledge and Adam fight over who had the best first car (Tanner: 1985 Honda CRX, Rutledge: 1981 VW Rabbit Pickup Diesel, Adam: 1987 Dodge Aries K).: Challenge 1: Alignment test. Each host had to drive toward a column of trash and let go of the steering wheel, to see which car had better alignment. Least amount of trash hit without steering wins. Not wanting to damage his car, Rutledge cheats by steering with his knees. Winner: Rutledge; Challenge 2: Teaching a new driver. With students that resemble the hosts when they were younger, each had to instruct the trainee on how to operate their cars. Adam wins the challenge with his car being an automatic.Winner: Adam; Challenge 3: Three-way rear-end collision. Using a pulley system, all three cars are smashed together at 25 miles an hour. The winner would be determined if the car is still able to operate after the crash. Tanner's car loses a wheel and the engine dies, while Adam and Rutledge are both able to drive away with their cars. Winners: Adam and Rutledge; Overall Winner: Adam Feature: Tanner and Adam get to race their dream first cars—the Corvette ZR1 and Ferrari 458.
13	3	"America's Strongest Pickup"	August 7, 2011	1.83
Guest: Bill Engvall Challenge: Tanner picks a Ford F450 Super Duty, Rutledge takes a Chevrolet Silverado 3500HD and Adam drives a Ram 3500 HD Turbo Diesel head into the mountains to decide which is the toughest pickup in America.: Challenge 1: Drag Racing. First truck to cross the 1/4 mile wins. Due to Tanner doing a burn out, Rutledge comes in first, Tanner second and Adam far behind Winner: Rutledge; Challenge 2: Torque test. Each host must do a burnout and the longest skid marks wins. Rutledge can only do a burnout in reverse, Adam does a better burnout while Tanner shows off his driving skills by doing burnouts in circles and leaves doing a burnout. Winner: Tanner; Challenge 3: Uphill test. Each truck is tested on its traction and offroad capability by climbing an unstable slope of gravel. Adam and Rutledge pay Tanner back for his showboating as they know that he has no tire treads left after the previous test. This means that he fails to climb the hill which Adam and Rutledge achieve. Winner: Adam and Rutledge; Challenge 4: Towing capacity. Rutledge demonstrates his truck's towing ability by ripping down two telephone poles. Tanner manages to tow a freight engine and coal car. Adam argues that the telephone poles were already rotted and the train was on wheels, so he decides to pull down an entire house. No clear winner in this case. Rutledge points out that no matter who one ultimately due to Chevy's two victories it makes it the best Truck in America. Overall Winner: Rutledge; Feature: Tanner travels to the Atchafalaya Swamp in southern Louisiana to race the Local Motors Rally Fighter against an 800 horsepower supercharged airboat.
14	4	"Death Valley"	August 14, 2011	2.23
Challenge: What's the best 4x4 you can buy for $5,000? Tanner (1983 Jeep CJ7 Renegade), Rutledge (1989 Chevrolet K5 Blazer) and Adam (1994 Ford Bronco XLT) compete in an epic 400 mile journey from the Mojave Desert to Las Vegas in an attempt to find out. Adam wins the speed contest but breaks his rear axle on the rock-climbing contest, reducing his Bronco to a two-wheel drive, Tanner does well in the other contests of off-road driving, and keeping his trailer intact, but loses to Rutlege's Chevy Blazer when his Jeep runs out of gas. Winner: Rutledge
15	5	"Luxury Car Challenge"	August 21, 2011	1.81
Guest: Arlene Tur Challenge: New Jersey is home to more luxury cars than anywhere else in America. Tanner (Jaguar XJ-S), Rutledge (Ferrari 308 GTBi replica) and Adam (Rolls-Royce Silver Shadow) head to the Hamptons to see if they can pass off these cars to locals. Feature: Tanner puts the new 911 GT2RS through its paces.
16	6	"The $500 Challenge"	August 28, 2011	1.97
Guest: Adam Levine Challenge: Tanner, Rutledge and Adam race along the Pacific Coast Highway to see whose $500 clunker is best. Rutledge chooses a Ford Festiva, Tanner takes a 1989 Mercedes 190E while Adam drives a 1994 Crown Victoria.: Challenge 1: Push Test. First host to push his car 100 yards win. Winner: Rutledge; Challenge 2: Grand Theft Clunker. Each host was given a coat hanger and challenged to break into the other hosts' car. First to do so would win. Adam becomes fed up with using a coat hanger and literally breaks into Tanner's car with a crowbar. Winner: Adam; Challenge 3: Forensic analysis. Each car was subjected to forensic analysis and the least constaminated car would win. Rutledge's car was found to be full of animal hair, urine, seminal fluid and traces of animal feces. Adam's car was full of vomit and blood, (though he states that's to be expected in a taxi), while Tanner's car is shown to be the most contaminated with dead skin cells, unknown protein-rich substance, mucus and staphylococcus bacteria. Afterwards, all three hosts try methods to protect themselves from the contaminants. Winner: Adam; Challenge 4: Finish line at Twin Peaks. All three cars had to navigate the streets of San Francisco and rush hour traffic. Rutledge's Festiva begins to overheat and its clutch burns out, leaving him to push his car out of downtown. Tanner's car takes the lead but stalls out as it tries to climb up the steep incline towards Twin Peaks. Despite having over 425,000 miles on it, Adam's car is the only one that finishes the race. Winner: Adam; Feature: Rutledge reviews the new Cadillac CTS-V family and tries to convince an unbelieving Adam that their performance is on par with supercars by drag-racing a CTS-V Wagon against a Ferrari California.
17	7	"Beating Tanner"	September 4, 2011	1.67
Guest: Bridget Marquardt Challenge: Fed up with Tanner always showing off on the show, Rutledge and Adam put Tanner through a series of tests to see if there is anything he can't do in a car. Feature: As part of the challenges, Tanner attempts to break the indoor world speed record (set in Series 8, Episode 6 of the British Top Gear).
18	8	"Hollywood Cars"	September 18, 2011	1.52
Guest: Steve Schirripa Challenge: The presenters construct replicas of their favorite Hollywood cars. Rutledge takes a 1995 Pontiac Trans Am which he disguises as KITT by adding switches and a front radar, Tanner buys a Nissan 200SX disguised as the DeLorean time machine as he puts gullwing doors on it and fits large metal plates on the back of it and Adam gets a 1973 Plymouth Duster which he recreates as the General Lee by painting orange with an 01, welding the doors shut and giving a loud horn. They put them through various challenges to see whose is best. On the way to the first challenge Rutledge enjoys driving his Trans Am, Tanner's Nissan gets mistaken for the actual time machine and Adam's Duster only attracts the attention of homeless people, one of which gives him a tip. Once at their destination Adam and Tanner fail to get out of their cars.: Challenge 1: Speed. Each car must accelerate to 88mph (reference to Back to the Future) and then brake. They must beat the distance set by a Suzuki SX4, their reasonably priced car. If they don't stop in time the cars will crash through a whole barrier of boxes placed at the end of the SX4 mark. Rutledge's Trans Am easily reaches 88mph and stops well short of distance set by the SX4. Tanner's Nissan fails to reach 88mph instead maxing at 77mph before smashing into the boxes. Adam's Duster has a broken speedometer, and not only does smashes through the boxes at 73mph but his brakes fail causing him to spin out and crash into a field. Winner: Rutledge; Challenge 2: J Turn. Each car must perform a J-Turn, most consistent and impressive one wins. Despite his gullwing door opening Tanner's Nissan manages to do a complete J-Turn. Adam's Duster fails to complete J-Turn due to his poor brakes and slow steering rack. Although Rutledge gains the greatest speed, he loses traction due to his Trans Am ending up on dirt. Winner: Tanner; Final Challenge: Outrunning Badguys. Each car must avoid a whole range of movie obstacles while outrunning a typical bad guy who is The Stig in a 2011 Chevrolet Camaro SS, each car is given a 15 second head start and the time stops when the car is overtaken, the car which stays the longest time in front of the Stig will win. Tanner's Nissan hits one obstacle and lasts 3:05 before being overtaken. Adam's Duster hits one obstacle and lasts 1:19 before being overtaken. Despite Rutledge having cut his Trans Am's steering wheel he only hits one obstacle and lasts 3:34 before being overtaken. Winner: Rutledge; In the End: Despite Adam raising budget issues and Tanner's claims about his victory, Rutledge points out that the challenge was to build the best budget movie car which was easily the Trans Am KITT. Overall Winner: Rutledge Feature: Tanner reviews the new Subaru Impreza WRX STI and races the car through a ghost town against X-Games dirt bike champion Cam Sinclair.
19	9	"Big Rigs"	February 14, 2012	2.07
Guest: Edward Burns The hosts must learn to drive big rigs in one afternoon, then must complete a series of challenges in their trucks.: Challenge 1: Drive forward 100 yards from a parking space, then reverse back into the parking space. Winner: Rutledge; Challenge 2: From a standing stop, and starting on a 15% incline, drive forward without rolling back and destroying the driver's watch, cell phone and glasses. Winner: Rutledge; Challenge 3: A three lap race around an oval track to simulate two lane traffic. Winner: Tanner; Challenge 4: Drive 40 miles on an open road to deliver fragile cargo; the driver with the least amount of damage to their cargo wins. Tanner carried a dining table complete with food, wine and water glasses. Adam carried pianos, bowling balls and shelves of paint cans with the lids open. Rutledge carried lighted barbecues and boxes of fireworks. Winner: Tanner
20	10	"Muscle Cars"	February 21, 2012	1.64
Guest: Patrick Warburton The hosts each select a modern day version of a classic American muscle car to see if they're deserving of the muscle car name. Rutledge chose the 2012 Dodge Challenger SRT8. Adam chose the 2012 Ford Mustang GT. Tanner chose the 2012 Chevrolet Camaro SS.: Challenge 1: The hosts drive 20 miles compete in a drag race at the L.A. River. They used the classic version of their cars and switched to the modern day cars at the halfway mark. Rutledge began in the 1970 Dodge Challenger, Adam in the 1970 Ford Mustang Boss 302 and Tanner in the 1969 Chevrolet Camaro SS. Winner: Tanner; Challenge 2: The hosts drive 60 miles to a drive-in movie theater in Riverside, CA. The hosts had to complete a slalom circuit in the parking lot followed by a 360 degree turn around a flag followed by a race back to the finish line, all while connected to an electronic muscle stimulator. Winner: Adam; Challenge 3: The hosts drive to the Auto Club Speedway in Fontana, CA. They each have to try to achieve as close to the top speed of their car as possible, which was set earlier by The Stig. Winner: Rutledge; Race: Tanner and Rutledge head to the old west in souped up Mustangs to have a relay race against two riders on horseback from Dead Horse Point State Park to the Colorado River. Rutledge chose the 2012 Roush Stage 3 Mustang and Tanner chose the 2012 Ford Mustang Boss 302.
21	11	"Dangerous Cars"	February 28, 2012	1.74
Guest: Joe Mantegna The hosts try to discover which car was the most dangerous to drive. Rutledge drives the Chevrolet Corvair, which was known for its tendency to oversteer. Adam drives a 1974 Ford Pinto, which had a history catching fire when rear-ended, and Tanner drives a 1988 Suzuki Samurai, which would roll over at speeds over 40 mph.: Challenge 1: All three had to race around a curving track. First person to finish wins. Rutledge could not handle the Corvair's oversteering and Tanner rolled the Samurai. Winner: Adam.; Challenge 2: The cars were modified in an attempt to correct the cars' flaws. Each driver had to drive around a slalom course of boxes, while being pelted with eggs, water balloons, confetti and other objects to obscure his vision. Smallest number of boxes hit wins. Winner: Adam.; Challenge 3: All three drivers had to compete in a demolition derby with other cars for three minutes. First car to leave the arena wins. Adam's Pinto catches fire at the end of the challenge. Winner: Rutledge.; Feature: Adam is challenged to improve his driving speed and safety in an Ariel Atom. After Adam sets his time, Boris Said teaches Adam the fundamentals of car control. Adam wins the challenge by beating his initial time by 23 seconds.
22	12	"Continental Divide"	March 6, 2012	2.07
Feature: The challenge is to follow a pioneer trail through the Rocky Mountains by using the modern equivalent of the covered wagon: the minivan. Rutledge chooses a 1999 all-wheel drive Chevy Astro. Adam drives a 2001 all-wheel drive Chrysler Town & Country. Tanner picks a rear-wheel drive Ford Aerostar with manual transmission.: Challenge 1: Ice curling. On an ice rink, the minivans had to accelerate, brake and slide toward a cooler on an ice rink. As in the sport of curling, closest to the cooler wins; as in the real game, one driver may bump another driver away. Adam hits the cooler, Rutledge bumps him and dislodges the cooler; Tanner gets closest. Winner: Tanner.; Challenge 2: Racing and unloading. Each driver must race down a high-altitude road, remove his minivan's back seat and race back. Rutledge begins feeling the effects of altitude sickness. Tanner planned to have his rear seat fall out of his vehicle, but the plan doesn't work. Both lose to Adam's greater horsepower. Winner: Adam.; Challenge 3: Livestock transport. The winner transports a live farm animal with the least amount of damage to his minivan. Adam carried a pig, Rutledge a sheep and Tanner three goats. Adam deliberately loses the challenge when he lets his pig go due to the smell. Tanner's goats eats an ashtray. Winner: Rutledge.; Challenge 4: All three vehicles must traverse a dangerous mule trail across the Rocky Mountains to an icy lake, then float their vehicle to the opposite shore. Tanner's rear-wheel-drive minivan gets stuck twice and requires the use of his winch and the help of the other hosts to cross the divide. At the lake, Rutlege tries to use a bicycle-powered paddleboat device but finds that he cannot steer his vehicle. He gives up while trying to push his vehicle across in the icy water. Adam planned to use an outboard motor to get him across, but he forgot to put gas in the engine and had to paddle manually. Tanner paddled to the other side, tied the winch cable to the shore and used the winch to get him across. Winner: Rutledge (despite forfeiting the challenge earlier, Rutledge claims victory since his minivan drifted to the shore before Tanner's. Adam and Tanner concede, since neither one wanted to be known as the minivan expert).
23	13	"Supercars"	March 13, 2012	2.21
Feature: The hosts are given the challenge of driving three high-end cars from New England to New York City and presenting them to a mysterious celebrity buyer. Rutledge gets a Lamborghini Murcielago Roadster, Adam gets a Bentley Continental GTC and Tanner gets a Porsche Turbo S Cabriolet. The winner would be the one whose car was picked by the mystery celebrity. The challenges presented clues to his/her identity.: Challenge 1: Golf balls and toupees. Each driver would wear a wig with his car's top down and try to outrun a golf ball being hit by a pro golfer. The winner would not only beat the golf ball to the finish line, but also keep the wig on his head. Rutledge outruns the golf ball, but loses the wig. Adam keeps the wig, but does not outrun the golf ball. Tanner outruns the golf ball and keeps the wig, due to his car having a windscreen. Winner: Tanner.; Challenge 2: Not too old to drive. Each host would race two laps around a racetrack, but one lap must be driven by an elderly co-driver. Fastest combined time wins. Winner: Tanner.; Challenge 3: The identity of the mystery celebrity is revealed to be Donald Trump. Each host must drive his car to New York and debate with Donald Trump in a boardroom over why his car was the best pick. Tanner and Rutledge each praise his vehicle while trying to downplay the other's. However, Adam gives the best argument for his car's utilitarian qualities. In the end, Adam is 'hired' while Tanner and Rutledge are 'fired' as Donald Trump chooses the Bentley. Winner: Adam
24	14	"Limos"	March 20, 2012	1.72
Feature: The hosts are challenged to create their idea of the perfect limousine and drive a celebrity to the Emmy Awards. Rutledge decides to resurrect his 1981 VW Rabbit Pickup Diesel, and join it back-to-back with another one, creating a twin-cab vehicle in which he hopes will eliminate the need for reverse driving. He adds a barbecue grill and safety seat in the co-joined cargo bed. The main design flaw is that he cannot use both engines at the same time, and with two cojoined vehicles, he had doubled the weight and cut the horsepower in half. Tanner takes a 1987 Chevrolet Corvette and turns it into a 35-foot stretch limo, with high performance but little attention to the interior, aside from a racing chair on rails for the guest. This gives the car a huge turning radius, and prevents it from climbing over any speedbumps or slopes without scraping its underbelly. Adam converts a 1969 Lincoln Continental Mark III into a version of the Popemobile, with a couch sitting high in the rear, encased in a glass cage. This makes it top-heavy, unstable and braking difficult.: Challenge 1: Limo Drag-Racing. Winner is the first around the 1/4 mile route. Tanner's limousine was the fastest in a straight line, but the car's huge turning radius, slows him down. Winner: Adam.; Challenge 2: Luxury Test. With the Stig driving the limo around the test track, each host had to mix martinis. Adam manages to make 3. Tanner is unable to make any as the G-forces in the rear of his car throws him around. Despite the slower speed of his limo, the open seating area causes Rutledge's martinis to blow away. Winner: Adam; Challenge 3: Turning and Handling. Each host had to maneuver around and parallel-park between cars from previous episodes, pick up a dummy passenger safely, and drive past obstacles such as the paparazzi, a ball launcher and a water cannon. Rutledge manages to complete the challenge in the fastest time. Tanner breaks the passenger dummy, is unable to parallel park due to his car's length and smashes into the paparazzi. Adam crashes his limo during the maneuvering part and does not finish the challenge. Winner: Rutledge; Challenge 4: Driving to the Emmys. Each host had to pick up his celebrity and drive him/her to the Emmys on time. Adam picks up Cloris Leachman. Rutledge was assigned Terri Seymour. Tanner drove Bruno Tonioli. Rutledge's limo's underpowered engine breaks down, leaving Terri Seymour to take a taxi to the Emmys. Adam gets lost and drives over tire-hazard spikes, thereby leaving Cloris Leachman to walk. Despite the insults from his passenger, Tanner manages to get his guest to the Emmys with 2 minutes to spare. Winner: Tanner
25	15	"Rut's Show"	March 27, 2012	1.60
Guest: Lake Bell Feature: To celebrate the 25th episode of the U.S. version of Top Gear, Rutledge is given full control over the show. The features include his dream to take part in an official race, compete with Adam in a challenge to collect the most tips with a designated driver program, and try to solve the problem of charging an electric car while on the road. This is also an episode in which Tanner does not take part in any of the challenges.: Challenge 1: Rutledge's desire to take part in an official race has him and Adam competing in a Superlite truck off-road race in California. Both train to handle the vehicles, then race each other for the one remaining spot in the official race. Winner: Rutledge (However, he rolls his truck in the race and finishes in last place.); Challenge 2: In San Francisco, Adam and Rutledge hire on as designated drivers and bet who would get the most tips. Rutledge first drives a Volkswagen Beetle with a military motif and gets a $20 tip. Adam gets lost on his first call, but ends up driving a Bentley Continental Flying Spur and receives no tip. Rutledge's second call was to drive a couple home in a 2009 Jeep Grand Cherokee, but he receives no tip due to the custormers being in a lusty embrace. Adam's second call allowed him to do a burnout with a custom 1966 Ford Mustang, earning him a $40 tip. Rutledge's last call which had him driving a group of girls home in a Honda Civic, earning him a $10 tip for a total of $30. Adam's last call had him driving two drag queens home in a Dodge Ram pickup. He gets a $20, thereby earning $60 total for the night. Winner: Adam; Challenge 3: Rutledge attempts to solve the problem of electric cars running out of power while on the road, (i.e.: range anxiety). His plan is to have Adam on the back of a pickup with an electric generator and a power cable. With the Stig driving the truck, Adam is to toss the cable to Rutledge in order to charge his car's electric motor once it begins to run low on power. After a few attempts and the Stig finally slowing down the speed, Rutledge succeeds in catching the cable and plugs it into his car. The practicality of using a gas-powered truck, a gas-powered generator and throwing the cable to the driver to charge an electrical car is questionable.
26	16	"Worst Cars"	April 3, 2012	1.58
Guest: Kal Penn Feature: The hosts are challenged with deciding the worst car in America. They are given $1,500 to buy a car for another host to determine which is the worst. Tanner purchases a 1977 Mustang II, to be driven by Adam. Adam purchases a 2001 Pontiac Aztek, to be driven by Rutledge. Rutledge purchases a 1988 Yugo GV, to be driven by Tanner.: Challenge 1: The hosts must drive their cars 60 miles to Willow Springs Raceway and compete in a race. The winner will be determined by the fastest lap time. Upon arrival they learn that it is an exotic car track day, meaning they will be racing their cars against the likes of Ferraris, Lamborghinis and other exotic cars. Rutledge goes off the track and is disqualified. Tanner's Yugo loses its gas cap and is disqualified for leaking fuel on the track. Adam successfully completes his lap and is declared the winner of the challenge. Winner: Adam; Challenge 2: The three hosts defend their cars by performing some small challenges.; Mini-challenge 1: Tanner and Adam compete in a 60 foot race, with Adam driving his Mustang II and Tanner on foot. Winner: Tanner; Mini-challenge 2: Tanner is tasked with proving he can perform a J-turn in his Yugo while blindfolded. While he does almost roll the car, he is successful. Winner: Tanner; Mini-challenge 3: Rutledge is challenged to drive his Aztek up the side of a mountain. Rutledge makes it most of the way, but gets stuck near the top.; Challenge 3: For their final challenge the cars will be auctioned off, with the winner being determined by the car that sells for the most at the auction. Each host is given $1,000 to modify their cars in any way they see fit. Tanner adds some performance parts to his car, such as a roll-cage, racing seat, 5-point harness, and removes unnecessary weight in an effort to increase the Yugo's performance. Adam adds a "Shelby-ish" paint job to his Mustang II (opting for silver and blue paint over the traditional white and blue). He also removes the II from the Mustang II badge and adds some interior modifications. Rutledge, in an effort to increase the Aztek's off-road capabilities, adds a brush guard, externally mounted spare, large tires, and cuts out the wheel arches. Tanner's Yugo sells for $600. Adam's Mustang II originally sells for $1,000, based on Adam's claim it was owned by Eric Clapton. After the auction it is shown Adam did not receive the full $1,000. Rutledge's car sells for $4,100. At the conclusion of this challenge the Mustang II is declared to be the worst car in America. Winner: Rutledge; Review: Tanner travels to England to test the new Noble M600. Noble has not yet determined the top speed of the M600 and Tanner is tasked with determining the top speed of the vehicle. He races a Lamborghini Gallardo Superleggera and an Audi R8 V10 in half-mile drag race. The M600 comes in first, beating the Superleggera in second and the R8 in third. Tanner then takes the M600 to an American Air Force base to determine the maximum top speed. Tanner drove the M600 to 215 MPH. Tanner gives a generally favorable review of the M600. He praises the car for its large power to weight ratio and calls it "...one of the purest driving experiences around," due to its lack of driver aids. At the conclusion of his review, Tanner states, "The M600 has proven itself to be a member of the supercar elite."

== Broadcast ==
The season was aired from July 24, 2011, until April 3, 2012, on History, airing on a weekly basis. In the United Kingdom, the season was aired on BBC Three under the name Top Gear USA from January 13, 2012. However, the season halted airing on January 27, before continuing its run on June 29, 2012.

== DVD release ==
The season 2 DVD was released on February 19, 2013.
