= Top Gear (American TV series) season 4 =

Top Gear
- Season 4
- No. of episodes: 10

Release
- Original network: History Channel
- Original release: September 3 – November 26, 2013

Season chronology
- ← Previous; Season 3 Next → Season 5

The fourth season of Top Gear began airing on History from September 3, 2013 until November 26, 2013. Adam Ferrera, Tanner Foust, Rutledge Wood and The Stig returned as hosts, with ten weekly episodes being broadcast.

== Production ==
Ferrara announced on April 30, 2013 that filming for a fourth season had officially begun, and this series later premiered on September 3, 2013.

== Episodes ==
No. overall	No. in season	Title	Original release date	US viewers (millions)
43	1	"Coast to Coast"	September 3, 2013	2.01
The hosts decide to take three expensive supercars on a 3,000 mile road trip across the United States from Lower Manhattan in New York, to Venice Beach in Los Angeles. The loser would have to pay for the entire gasoline bill for all three cars. Rutledge chose a $280,000 Lamborghini Gallardo LP570-4 Super Trofeo Stradale, Tanner decided on a $320,000 McLaren MP4-12C Spider. Adam drove a $152,000 SRT Viper.: Unofficial Challenge: Drag Race on an airport runway. Due to Tanner's car having a launch system, he wins with Rutledge in second and Adam in last place. Winner: Tanner; Challenge 1: In Pennsylvania, the hosts are challenged to get an authentic Amish Hat from an Amish person. Tanner and Adam buy theirs at souvenir shops while Rutledge manages to get a real one after giving a local a ride in his car. Winner: Rutledge While driving to the next challenge, the hosts must stop at a filthy motel for the night. To protect their expensive cars, Adam decides to sleep in his, Tanner takes out the ignition fuses for his, and Rutledge chains one leg to his vehicle.; Challenge 2: In Missouri, the hosts must find the biggest football stadium and take a picture of his car on the 50-yard line. The one with the largest football stadium wins. Tanner manages to get his picture taken at the stadium of the Missouri Tigers college team. Rutledge decided to follow Adam to Kansas City to Arrowhead Stadium, though he is unable to get his car onto the field. Adam manages to get onto the 50 yard-line. Arrowhead Stadium seats 79,000 while the Missouri college stadium seats only 71,000. Winner: Adam; Challenge 3: The hosts are sent through the Eisenhower Tunnel in Colorado to see who could get through it the fastest. Adam makes 147 mph, Rutledge achieves 150 mph and Tanner gets 165 mph. Winner: Tanner; Challenge 4: In Los Angeles, California, the hosts must take a picture of a famous celebrity in their car and take the picture to Venice Beach. First host at Venice Beach with a celebrity picture wins. Tanner goes driving around the city, looking through movie premieres but having no luck on a Monday afternoon. Rutledge follows behind a celebrity tour bus, hoping to find a celebrity at home. Adam decides to just call on his list of famous friends, though none were able to help him. In desperation, Tanner manages to get a Marilyn Monroe lookalike to pose in his car. Rutledge speaks to Laurence Fishburne through the speaker at the gate to his driveway. Rutledge gets to Venice Beach first and shows the others the picture of Fishburne's gate. Tanner shows off his picture of Marilyn Monroe. Despite being the last to arrive, due to a stroke of luck, Adam brings along Dolph Lundgren. Winner: Adam; Reward: Tanner's picture of a lookalike does not qualify as a celebrity in his car, as does Rutledge's picture of Laurence Fishburne's gate. Adam is declared the final winner with two wins and Tanner is stuck with paying a gas bill of over $2000.
44	2	"Alaskan Adventure"	September 10, 2013	1.45
The guys construct homemade convertibles tough enough to survive in America's 49th state and road test them in a series of challenges as they drive from Anchorage to Homer. Rutledge buys a 1999 Jeep Cherokee Classic which he cuts the roof into three sections in order to be removed, Tanner chooses a 1999 Chevrolet Express which he turns into a Soft-Top Convertible and Adam for the first (and possibly only) time takes a 1999 Toyota Tacoma Xtra Cab which he turns into a Targa Top.: Challenge 1: Ease of Use. They arrive at the Alaska Raceway Park where they must achieve a high speed and put the roof up. Adam sets a new world record and puts the roof on his Tacoma up at 35mph. During his run Rut asks Tanner to drive while he puts the roof up and although he achieves 50mph he fails to put the roof up on his Cherokee. During Tanner's run he fails to close the roof and hits the end of the straight in his Express. Winner: Adam; Challenge 2: Toughness. They all drive along an off road course to see which one of their designs would be the toughest. Despite Rut's Cherokee being the best off road he gets covered in mud. In the end Rut's Cherokee has nearly all its paint scratched, Tanner had a broken taillight, side mirror and rocker panel on his Express but Adam's Tacoma was just dusty meaning he won again. Winner: Adam; When they arrive at the campsite to prove Tanner's Design is poorly made, Adam and Rut put tuna in the roof which attracts a Grizzly Bear. To get back at Adam for showing off Tanner and Rut increase the pressure of his roof firing the Roof off and when they leave bashing the Tacoma.: Challenge 3: Roof Strength. A chunk of water carried by a Helicopter will be lifted in the air and dropped on the roof of their cars. Rut's Cherokee takes this well, Adam's Tacoma takes it terribly and Tanner avoids to take the challenge by racing away towards Homer in his Express. Rut follows and Adam fails to start his Tacoma. Winner: Rutledge; Challenge 4: Race to Homer. With Tanner and Rut left they both race to Homer using different roots. Tanner takes the road as he is an expert driver whereas Rut takes a boat across the shore to Homer. In the end Tanner arrives first with Rut in Second. Winner: Tanner; In the End: Before Rut and Tanner can agree on a winner Adam arrives with a helicopter carrying his battered Tacoma. He drops it on its face killing it immediately. Rut and Tanner claim that since their cars are still alive they win but Adam claims his two victories makes the Tacoma the overall winner. In the end Rut and Tanner are willing to accept Adam as the winner but since they are sick of Adam destroying cars both refuse to drive him to the hotel. As both leave Adam and his wrecked Tacoma are left stranded but Adam concludes that the Tacoma is the best convertible in Alaska. Overall Winner: Adam
45	3	"Off Road Racing"	September 17, 2013	1.54
Tanner takes Adam and Rut to try out extreme off road racing in rally cars, which involves driving at high speeds through the woods on narrow dirt roads with hairpin turns. Despite Tanner's experience, Rut and Adam challenge him to a race. While they take lessons to prepare, Tanner hones his skills at a nearby rally race. When they all meet up again, their friendly competition turns out to be way more epic than Tanner expected. Winner: Adam
46	4	"America's Biggest Cars"	September 24, 2013	1.88
America is known for making big cars and the '60s and '70s saw some of the biggest. But which one of these behemoths is the best? To find out, the Top Gear guys select their favorite and compete in a series of challenges as they travel along the Mississippi. Adam selects a 1970 Buick Electra 225 which he's loved since he was a kid, Tanner selects a 1974 Lincoln Continental Mark IV which is over 19 ft long and Rutledge selects a 1976 modified Chevrolet Caprice Classic. Upon driving to their first challenge both Tanner and Adam's cars have soft, floaty suspension, Tanner actually describes how "They don't build luxury cars like they used to", whereas Rutledge's modified Caprice rides so harshly due to his 24 inch tires.: Challenge 1: Speed. The Three have to drive down a short stretch of Pavement to see which one of their cars achieves the highest top speed. Tanner's Lincoln achieves 71 mph, Rut's Caprice achieves 68 mph and Adam's Buick achieves 83 mph. Winner: Adam; Challenge 2: Comfort. The three have driven down a stretch of railroad track back and forth to see which car is the most comfortable. Tanner's Lincoln does a near-perfect run spilling very little food on the way despite throwing it all on the floor at the end and achieving a time of 56:1 seconds. Despite being known as the wrecker, Adam doesn't want to damage his Buick as he loves it so much so he doesn't bother with the challenge. Rut's Caprice spills all the food initially when he is travelling down the railroad track and then upon reversing smashes one of his wheels so they need replacing and achieves 4:10. Adam and Tanner leave him behind. Winner: Tanner; While waiting for the next challenge at a riverbed Adam and Tanner find Rut arriving with 14-inch tires on his Caprice. Tanner calls Rut a freaking idiot as he has just made his Caprice worse than it was.: Final Challenge: How Big? Each presenter must prove how big their car is by doing the most obscure thing. Rutledge puts a boat in the trunk of his Caprice, Adam carries a piano on the roof of his Buick and Tanner catches a parachuted Stig on the bonnet of his Lincoln. Despite Rut's and Adam's claims Tanner points out that catching a Human being is far more relevant than carrying material goods and claims that the Lincoln is the best big american car. Winner: Tanner; Reward: Tanner gets to drive the new Chevrolet Corvette C7 Stingray. He is impressed with its straight-line performance, cornering speeds and G and also the Quality of interior showing how America are now moving into Europeans league by ultimately saying how it is the closest thing to a Porsche 911. He then does a race against himself whereby in one car (The Blue Car) the Corvette's Stability control is on and in another (The Red Car) it is off. Despite the Blue car getting off to a faster Start, The red car wins by a Centimetre. He concludes by saying how the Corvette Stingray is a Masterpiece and will finally be an American Car which Europeans might appreciate and respect.
47	5	"Sturgis"	October 22, 2013	1.73
The Top Gear hosts embark on a two-wheel road trip through South Dakota to the world's largest automotive event, the annual Sturgis Bike Week. Starting out on scooters and needing to pass challenges to progress to the bigger bikes they'll need to ride to fit in at the rally, the hosts go through hell as they close in on Sturgis. The winner will race a super-charged Ariel Atom against a 200 mph sports bike, while the loser will have to take part in a stunt, courtesy of The History Channel's newest series, American Daredevils. The hardest challenge features the slowest bike race ever, in which the winner loses. Tanner cheats least and wins overall. He takes on the super-bike in the Ariel Atom and loses by half a lap. Adam loses the most challenges, but pays off a stunt driver to take his place in the final explosion.
48	6	"Can Cars Float?"	October 29, 2013	1.58
Is it possible to make a vehicle that's as good on water as it is on land? Rut, Adam and Tanner build their own amphibious vehicle and put them through a series of road tests before embarking on a huge water challenge, attempting to cross one of the Great Lakes. Tanner took a Plymouth Conquest while Rutledge opted for a Mk3 Volkswagen Golf Cabrio. During the show, Adam chooses to transform a Jeep Wrangler (YJ) into an airboat. As this was supposed to be the least likely to sink, they elect to place all their belongings and passports in the Jeep/Boat for the crossing of Lake Ontario to Toronto in Canada. Unfortunately, the Jeep sinks like a stone. Tanner is forced to abandon ship – twice! And Rut gets lost taking the three to Canada. After a whole day adrift, Rut and Adam finally manage to land successfully on the shore of Toronto, but then get arrested because they don't have passports.
49	7	"Fully Charged"	November 5, 2013	1.13
Adam, Rut and Tanner drive three of the bestselling electric cars on a journey through Michigan to determine which is best and showcase some surprising features. The unusual tests include a reverse high speed challenge, a race indoors, and a stealth mission. The winner gets to drive the new all-electric Tesla Model S. Tanner chooses a Ford Focus Electric, Rutledge chooses a Nissan Leaf, and Adam chooses a Fiat 500e.: Challenge 1: The three of them must beat the Chevrolet Camaro ZL1 in a quarter-mile run. Since their electric vehicles are too slow to compete with the Camaro, the producers arrange some custom-built all-electric racing cars to be used during the challenge: an all-electric Chevrolet S10, an all-electric Porsche 944, and an electric dragster. All three manage to beat the Camaro, but Tanner wins by having the fastest time of 8:58 seconds. Winner: Tanner; While driving to the next challenge, they contemplate about their cars and topics such as the omission of engine noise. They drive down to a small road for the next challenge.: Challenge 2: Electric cars are supposed to have the same amount of torque going backwards as well as forwards. So, to test the torque, the three each had to drive their cars as fast as they could in reverse. Each of them set a goal of beating the world record for reverse driving, which is 55 miles an hour. Tanner goes first, but only hits 20 miles an hour. Adam goes next, and only hits 27 miles an hour. They then suspect that all three cars were limited to 20–30 miles an hour for safety. But when Rutledge takes his turn, he hits 57 miles an hour. When Tanner and Adam accuse him of cheating, he admits that he had the limiter removed from the car. Despite this, he still claims victory. Winner: Rutledge; The trio drive to their next challenge. They discuss problems like range anxiety. They finally reach their next challenge at a Detroit mall.: Challenge 3: Because their cars have zero emissions, theoretically, you could drive it anywhere. The challenge was to drive from one side of the mall to the other without getting caught by a mall cop on a Segway. The first one out would win. Despite issues such as stopping at a food court and hiding in a dress boutique, all three make it out without getting caught by the mall cop. Rutledge wins, Tanner comes in second, and Adam reaches third place. Winner: Rutledge; Because it was late in the day, and their cars were low on charge, the three of them decide to turn in for the night. The next morning, they drive off to their final challenge. Adam describes electric car developments like the first video games. "I remember Pong was the first video game when I was a kid. Then we had Atari. Now look at what we've got. You've got Call of Duty and World of Warcraft. You can play online with a bunch of people from different countries around the world. It's the same thing with electric cars. The technology is gonna keep zooming. It ain't there yet. We're still at Pong." Having stated that, they reach their final challenge in a small suburban cul-de-sac.: Challenge 4: Electric cars are supposed to be quiet. To test their quietness, each person has to sneak out of a house, drive around the cul-de-sac and back without making a sound. Anything that peaked over 30 decibels (the level of regular talking) would set off an alarm, resulting in a 10-second penalty. Tanner scored the lowest time of 3:02 with 40 seconds in penalties. Despite this, Rutledge claims a moral victory, saying that his car did not get any penalties because he got them trying to escape. Winner: Rutledge; Reward: Rutledge gets to test drive the luxury class Tesla Model S Performance Plus. He puts it in a drag race against the Camaro ZL1 and wins. Rutledge praises the car's superior acceleration, cornering, and the interior; which he says was "Like a Spaceship" and "Lifted from the executive bathrooms at Apple headquarters." Rutledge then proceeds to a racetrack and reveals The Stig. He has the Stig lap a Mercedes-Benz S550 around the track. The Mercedes scores a time of 1:15. Stig then laps the Tesla with a time of 1:12, beating the Mercedes by 3 seconds. Rutledge then says,"So, if it's an exciting four-door sedan you want, forget the Germans (Mercedes-Benz, BMW, and Audi). Forget Lincoln and Cadillac. This is the car you want to buy. Now all I need to do is find an outlet."
50	8	"American Supercars"	November 12, 2013	N/A
Intro: Rutledge drives the 240mph Vector W8 which he describes as a car that gave the Europeans a run for their money. Yet due to financial costs, W8 productions stopped in 1993 and it appeared like the American Supercar was gone. However, now American Supercars are in the midst of a rebirth. To determine which one is the best, the hosts select their favorite and drive to Malibu California. Rutledge chooses a Saleen S7 as he always wanted to drive one, Adam chooses a Rossion Q1 which is an American version of a Noble M400 and Tanner chooses a Lucra LC470 which doesn't have a windshield.: Challenge 1: A Supercar should draw massive attention. The guys drive to Beverly Hills and have to see if their supercars can draw more attention than a Bugatti Veyron. Tanner's Lucra attracts 25 people. Rutledge's Saleen attracts 20 people. Adam's Rossion initially attracts no-one until Adam covers the Veyron in a sheet by which time he gets 30 people. Winner: Adam; Challenge 2: A Supercar should have fast acceleration. They guys head to a test track in the desert and do a drag race from 0-60. As Tanner's Lucra is the lightest he wins, Adam's Rossion comes in Second Place and Rutledge's Saleen in Third. Despite Rutledge's Saleen having more power than Adam's Rossion, it spins its wheels which gives it a bad start and means that it comes in Third Place. Winner: Tanner; Challenge 3: A Supercar should have a high Top-Speed. The guys head to a long straight on the test track to max their cars. Both Tanner's Lucra and Rutledge's Saleen have a Top-Speed of 200mph whereas Adam's Rossion has a Top Speed of 187mph. Tanner achieves 162mph, Rutledge achieves 160mph and Adam achieves 145mph. Winner: Tanner; Challenge 4: The competition culminates in the ultimate test: a head to race against European supercar powerhouses. Adam's Rossion takes on the $230,000 Ferrari 458 Italia, Rutledge's Saleen takes on the $400,000 Lamborghini Aventador and Tanner's Lucra takes on the $150,000 Porsche 911 GT3 RS. To give their cars a fair chance of winning, the allow the Stig to drive the American Supercars whereas they drive the European Supercars. In the end though all three American Supercars beat the Europeans despite Tanner being ultra-competitive. Winner: Tie; In the End Despite their victories both Tanner and Adam were disappointed with their Supercars, agreed that the American Supercar is still a concept that needs work and would much rather have the Porsche and the Ferrari to the Lucra and the Rossion. Rutledge however while agreeing that American Supercar is still a concept that needs work fell in love with the Saleen and would rather have it to the Lambo. Tanner points out that he still won. Overall Winner: Tanner Reward Tanner gets to drive the $300,000 622 horsepower Mercedes SLS AMG Black Series. He is very impressed by its brutal acceleration and Top Speed of 196mph. He then challenges himself to do over ten miles of twisting turning road in under ten minutes. It manages to do it and has impressive handling despite it being known as a Muscle. In the end Tanner praises it as an achievement, not just because of its all in one package but also because it also means of what the big automotive giants can do to push the emblem. He then gets back to the American Supercars and says how despite boutique shops doing their best, the proper supercars should be made by the big three, his final quote is "Dodge, Chevy, Ford, come on, we are ready".
51	9	"Big Bad Trucks"	November 19, 2013	N/A
Is it possible for a truck to be comfortable, easy to drive, and still maintain its toughness? To find out, the guys select their favorite no-expense-spared light duty truck and put them to the test in a series of escalating challenges to determine if they can perform both car and truck duties. They meet up in the San Gabriel Mountains, Rutledge picks a 2014 Toyota Tundra Crewmax 1794 Edition 4x4 due to its off road credentials and rear legroom, Tanner drives a 2014 Ford F150 Super Crew King Ranch 4x4 due to its torquey engine and practical rear end and Adam chooses a 2014 Ram 1500 Sport Cab 4x4 due to its gearbox and V8 Engine. Tanner and Adam criticise Rut for picking a Toyota in an American Truck showdown however Rut points out that the Tundra was built in Texas, Rut and Adam criticise Tanner as his Truck has 6cylinder but Tanner points out that it produces 420 ft lps of torque and Tanner and Rut criticise Adam for picking the smallest truck with the worst rear end by far but Adam points out that the workers drive the F150 and the Tundra and the Boss drives the Ram.: Challenge 1: Off Roading. They must each drive through a desert and the winner is the first one who reaches tarmac. Rut and Tanner take a left while Adam turns right. Tanner wastes time in the puddles to show his Truck's versatility. Eventually, Rut's Tundra arrives first, Tanner's F150 second and Adam's Ram nowhere in sight. Eventually, Tanner and Rut agree to leave Adam behind. Winner: Rutledge; Challenge 2: Handling. Rut and Tanner arrive at the Malibu Speed Zone where Adam is not to be found. The challenge is that they must complete the course, fastest time wins. Rut's Tundra completes the course in 57 seconds and Tanner's F150 completes the course in 54 seconds. Adam then appears with a broken arm, claiming that his Truck fell off a cliff so he broke his arm, and a Black Ram driven by The Stig. It completes the course in 53.9 seconds. Winner: Adam; Challenge 3: Easy to Use. A family of three (old person, middle age person and teenager) must each drive the truck from one point of a parking lot to the next. Tanner does it in the order middle age, teenager, old person, Adam does it in the order old person, middle age, teenager and Rut does it in the order middle age, old person, teenager. During Rut's old person's go she is to stubborn to figure out which is the gas and which is the brake on the Tundra meaning he lost. In the end it is a race between Tanner's F150 and Adam's (Stig's) Ram. In the end Tanner's F150 crosses the line first, Adam's Ram second and Rut's Tundra failed to complete the course. Winner: Tanner; Challenge 4: Safety. They must each accelerate and decelerate from 0-60-0, if they fail to do so they will each run over cardboard cutouts of themselves. Tanner's F150 manages to stop 1cm from his Cardboard cut out. Despite the Stig driving, Adam's Ram knocks over his cardboard cutout meaning he lost. Rut's Tundra stops a whole inch from his Cardboard cut out meaning he won. Winner: Rutledge; Final Challenge: Towing. They arrive at Ontario Airport where the biggest challenge awaits. They each must tow a massive Boeing 727 airplane around an obstacle course made of typical airport vehicles, Fastest Time Wins. Rut's Tundra goes first and he takes it smooth and slowly completing the course in 2:26. With the help of Adam turning the plane, the Stig completes the course with the Ram in 2:10. Despite this Tanner's F150 completes the course in 1:42. Winner: Tanner; In the End: Despite his claims, Both Tanner and Rut agree that the Ram is the worst pick out of the three as even with the Stig it failed to win most of the challenges and won the least relevant challenge to for Trucks. Despite Rutledge's claims that the Tundra was the best off road and the Safest, Tanner pointed out that this was relevant for cars only. Tanner points out that the most relevant challenge is Towing and Ease of Use which is exactly what the F150 won. Tanner concludes by saying how he understands why the F150 is still the best selling Truck in America. Overall Winner: Tanner
52	10	"Fountain of Youth"	November 26, 2013	N/A
Three vehicles with speed and sex appeal are compared by the guys. Adam chooses a red 1993 Chevrolet Corvette. Tanner chooses a yellow 1998 Porsche Boxster. Rutledge chooses a 1933 Ford Model A pickup Rat Rod.: Challenge 1: One mile road course race. Losers are saddled with mid-life crisis toys. Rut goes first and has problems making the corners. He gets a time of 3:11. The three flags penalty gives him a final time of 3:26. Since Adam still has a bum shoulder, the replacement driver is a stunt coordinator named Mickey. Mickey slides into a curb and blows a tire, but still posts a time of 2:10. The two flag penalty gives him a final time of 2:20. Tanner goes last. He decides to take a shortcut through a water hazard, stalls the car, and gets it stuck. This gives him a DNF. Tanner is given a jet ski to tow, fake tanning lotion, and 80s sunglasses. Rut gets a mullet headband and jacket. Winner: Adam On the drive to the next challenge, Tanner decides to dump the jet ski and sunglasses. Rut ditches his headband and jacket.; Challenge 2: Automotive Chicken. Race down a grassy path towards a gator filled pond. Adam puts Mickey up first. He barely touches the water. Tanner goes next and ends up getting the back tires just in. Finally Rut goes. He takes off his shoes and socks in anticipation of getting wet. He ends up putting the car farther in the water than Tanner. Winner: Adam; Challenge 3: Impress Women. Three ladies are to ride around with the guys for two laps each at Homestead-Miami Speedway. Adam has the women drive the car. The Corvette gets 5, 5, and 4 for a total of 14. The Porsche gets 6, 6, and 3 for a total of 15. The Rat Rod gets 2, 3, and 0 for a total of 5. Winner: Tanner; The guys make a few 'nips and tucks' before the final challenge. Adam puts on very wide wheels and tires and puts on deck stripes. Rut puts on flames and stacks and paints the wheels neon green. Tanner puts on the number 69 and a giant aluminum wing made from air conditioning ducting.: Challenge 4: Drag Racing. Racing for pink slips. If the car loses in the drag race, the presenter loses his car. Tanner chooses to race against a Chevrolet S-10. Rut chooses a Ford Focus ST. Adam opts for a turbocharged Honda Civic. Rut wins his race. Tanner's S-10 is not the 4 cylinder he thought it was and loses even with a rolling start. Adam catches the back bumper on fire with his last modification trying to intimidate the competition. He still loses his race. Winner: Rutledge; In the End Adam tries to claim victory as the Corvette won two challenges whereas the Boxster and the Rat Rod won one each and Tanner tries to claim victory as he says the most important thing in a mid-life crisis is to impress younger women which the Boxster won. Rutledge, however, claims that since both Adam and Tanner have lost their cars and he still has his, he warns them that they can either admit that he won or stay at the drag strip forever. In the end they admit defeat and Adam, Tanner, Rut and Mickey leave the drag strip in the Rat Rod. Overall Winner: Rutledge
