= Kia Mohave =

Mid-size SUV produced by Kia (2008-2024)

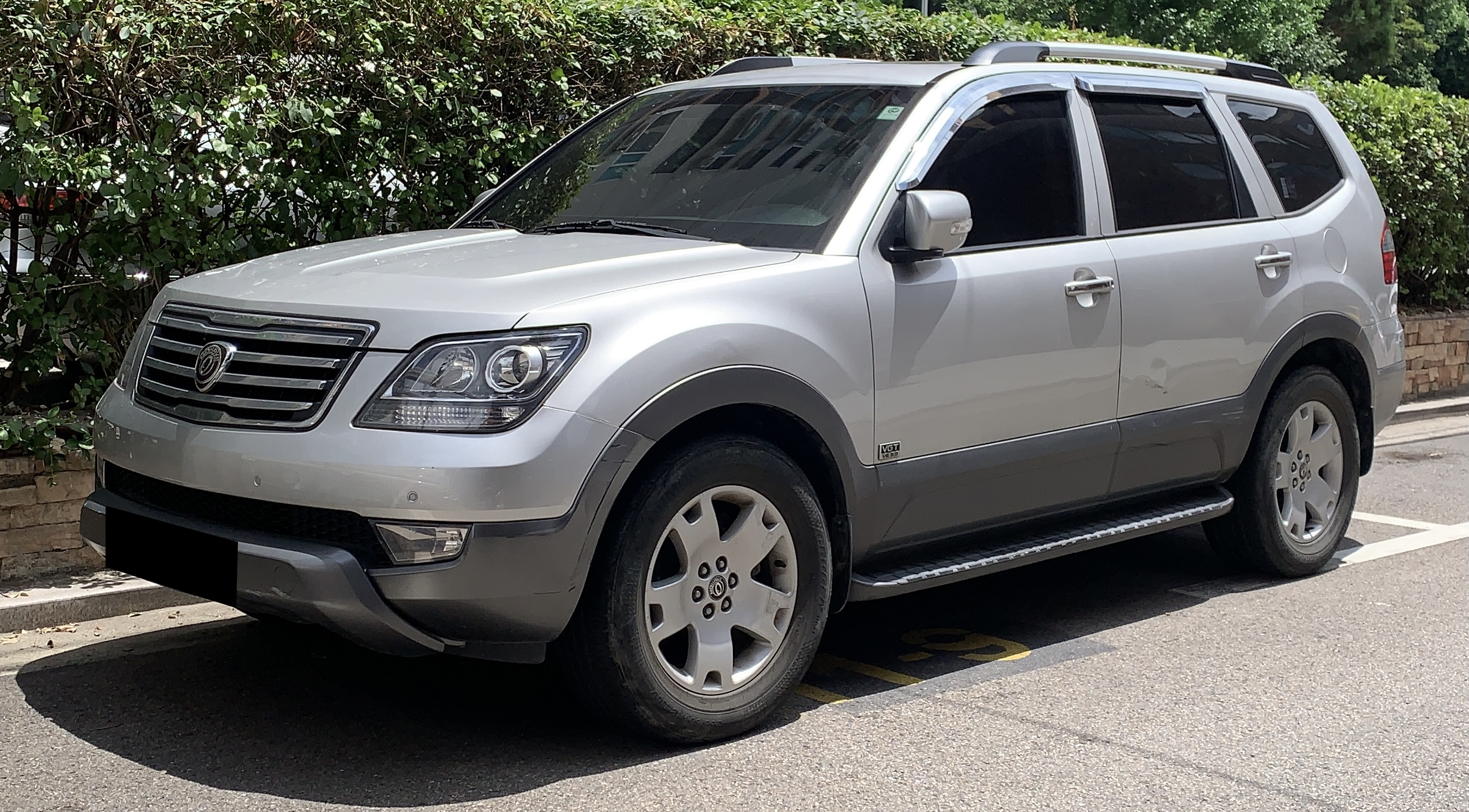

Overview
- Manufacturer: Kia
- Model code: HM
- Also called: Kia Borrego (North America and China)
- Production: 2008–2024
- Model years: 2009–2010 (North America)
- Assembly: South Korea: Hwaseong (Autoland Hwasung); Russia: Kaliningrad (Avtotor); Kazakhstan: Ust-Kamenogorsk; Ukraine: Chornomorsk (UkrAuto)
- Designer: Peter Schreyer

Body and chassis
- Class: Mid-size SUV
- Body style: 5-door SUV
- Layout: Front-engine, rear-wheel-drive; Front-engine, four-wheel-drive
- Chassis: Body-on-frame

Powertrain
- Engine: Petrol: 3.8 L Lambda II MPi V6; 4.6 L Tau MPi V8; Diesel: 3.0 L S CRDi V6; 3.0 L S II CRDi V6
- Transmission: 5-speed A5SR2 automatic; 6-speed ZF 6HP 26 automatic; 8-speed A8TR1 automatic

Dimensions
- Wheelbase: 2,895 mm (114.0 in)
- Length: 4,880 mm (192.1 in); 4,935 mm (194.3 in) (first facelift); 4,930 mm (194.1 in) (second facelift)
- Width: 1,915 mm (75.4 in); 1,920 mm (75.6 in) (second facelift)
- Height: 1,765 mm (69.5 in); 1,810 mm (71.3 in) (first facelift); 1,790 mm (70.5 in) (second facelift)
- Curb weight: 1,965–2,305 kg (4,332–5,082 lb); 2,250–2,305 kg (4,960–5,082 lb) (second facelift)

Chronology
- Successor: Kia Telluride (North America)

The Kia Mohave, also known in North America and China as the Kia Borrego, is a mid-size SUV with a body-on-frame construction manufactured by the South Korean manufacturer Kia, produced from 2008 to 2024.

It first debuted in 2008 in the South Korean and U.S. markets.

Borrego is named after Anza-Borrego Desert State Park in California, and it means "bighorned sheep", which can be found in the state park.

== Production history ==
The production model, designed by automotive designer Peter Schreyer, former chief designer for Audi, was introduced at the 2008 North American International Auto Show. The vehicle was originally shown as a concept car under the Kia Mesa name at the 2005 North American International Auto Show and went on sale in Korea as the Mohave prior to its release in the United States. The United States version of the Mohave was renamed Borrego, due to the Native American tribe of the same name. In the U.S., the Borrego was discontinued in the middle of the singular 2009 model year, after lower than expected sales and rising oil/petrol prices, though certain U.S. territories received a small allotment of V6 models sold until 2014. Kia, however, still continued selling the Borrego in Canada, meaning the Borrego was a Canada-only nameplate from 2010–2011. The Telluride would eventually fill this slot for the 2020 model year, serving as the successor to the Borrego. Domestic versions of the Mohave do not wear any Kia badges, instead using a version of the Kia Opirus's logo, due to their status as Kia's flagship models.

As of May 14, 2013, the model was officially discontinued in the U.S., with the 2011 Sorento as a placeholder, until the Telluride would debut in 2020 as a successor. This applies to all except South Korea, the Middle East, China, Central Asia, Brazil, Chile and Russia. It would later be dropped from the Chinese and Brazilian markets.

== Technical details ==
The Borrego utilized body-on-frame construction, with adjustable air-suspension, hill-descent control and a high- and low-range automatic transmission. The Borrego has three standard rows of seats in the US. The Borrego is fitted with either the 3.0 L VGT diesel V6 (in 2010), second-generation Lambda II 3.8 L V6 producing 206 kW (276 hp) or the 4.6 L V8 Hyundai Tau engine. The Tau V8 is tuned to give less power but more torque than in the Hyundai Genesis sedan, and creates 269 kW (361 hp). The V8 has a towing capacity of 3,400 kg (7,500 lb), and the V6 is able to tow 2,300 kg (5,000 lb). A navigation system was available as an option. 2011 introduced an upgraded engine and powertrain package, featuring an updated S-Line 3.0 L V6 CRDi (now named S-II) paired with an all-new eight-speed automatic transmission from Hyundai Powertech (shared with Hyundai-Kia's full-size rear-drive luxury sedans).

== North America ==
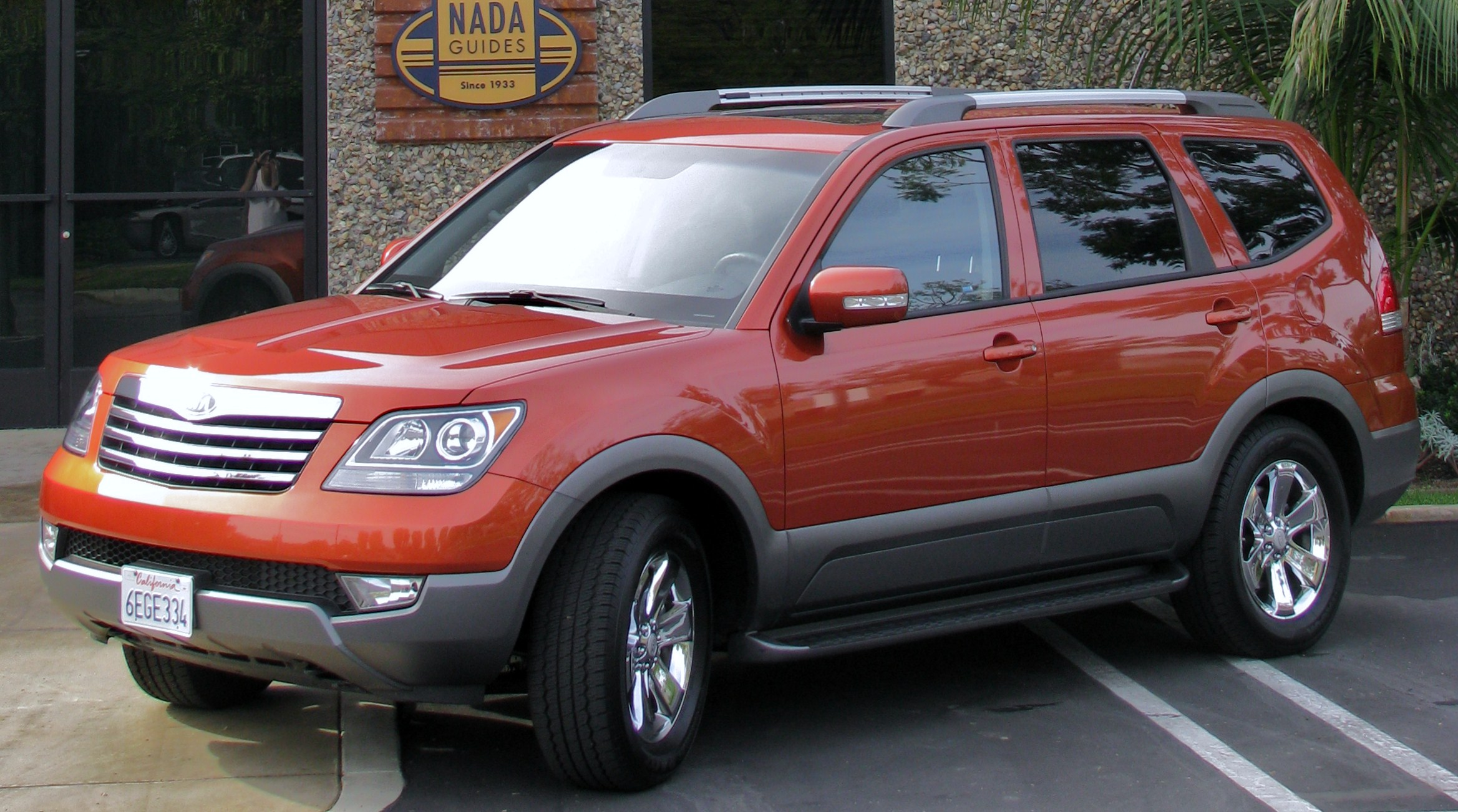

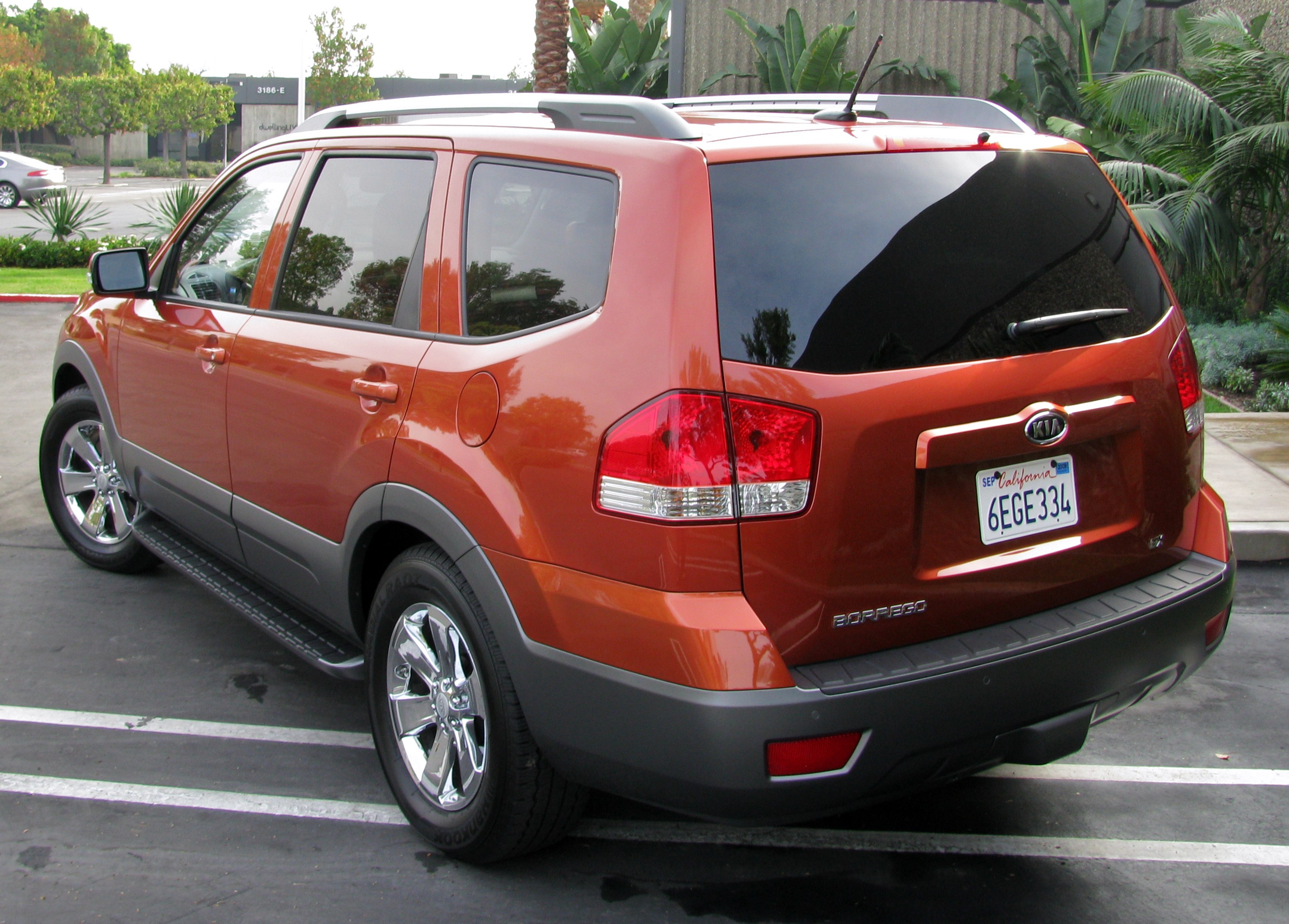
2009 Kia Borrego EX (US)

The Kia Borrego was introduced as the largest SUV in Kia's lineup of vehicles in the U.S. in July 2008 for the 2009 model year. The lineup of the Borrego in the U.S. was as follows:

The LX was the base model Borrego, though it was very well-equipped for its $26,245 MSRP base price. It included such features as: cloth upholstery, keyless entry, AM/FM stereo with single-disc CD/MP3 player and USB/iPod and auxiliary audio input jacks and SIRIUS Satellite Radio, six speakers, single-zone climate control, 17" alloy wheels, Electronic Stability Control, Hill Assist, lower Argent body cladding, and a 3.8 L V6 engine with a 5-speed automatic SHIFTRONIC transmission. Features such as a 6-disc in-dash CD/MP3 changer, power front bucket seats, leather seating surfaces, 4WD, and fog lamps were optional equipment.

The EX was the mid-grade version of the Borrego, had a $27,995 MSRP base price, and added features to the LX such as: an AM/FM stereo with six-disc in-dash CD/MP3 changer and SIRIUS, a 10-speaker Infinity premium sound system with external amplifier and rear-mounted subwoofer, steering wheel audio controller, leather wrapped steering wheel and shift knob, 18" alloy wheels, and power front bucket seats. Features such as 4WD, leather seats, heated dual front bucket seats, power sunroof, chrome 18" wheels, dual-zone climate control, touchscreen GPS navigation system with Bluetooth hands-free/streaming and voice recognition, a rear-seat DVD entertainment system, power adjustable pedals, and a 4.6 L Tau V8 engine with a 6-speed automatic SHIFTRONIC transmission were optional. All Tau models include their respective "V8" badges to the left of the "EX" badging; the V8 was only optional on EX models and standard on Limited trims.

The Limited was the ultimate top-of-the-line version of the Borrego, had a $37,995 MSRP base price, and added premium features to the EX such as: a standard 4.6 L Tau V8 engine, exclusive "Limited" badges on both front doors, air ride suspension, power adjustable pedals, black perforated leather seating surfaces, power dual front bucket seats, power sunroof, chrome 18" alloy wheels, heated dual front bucket and 2nd row seats (heated 2nd row seats were nearly unheard of in a Midsize class SUV,) Infinity premium touchscreen GPS navigation system with Bluetooth hands-free/streaming, SIRIUS, and voice recognition, 3D TFT instrument cluster display with electronic temperature gauge and red accents, push-button starter with keyless touch entry, and a Homelink transmitter. 4WD was optional. The Limited was only available with Onyx Black exterior/black perforated leather interior, and will be denoted by monochromatic cladding with small "Limited" badges on the bottom corners of both front doors. The Borrego Limited, along with the newly debuted Hyundai Genesis, denoted Hyundai and Kia North America's entry into the premium luxury market by offering premium features at a lower price point. This would eventually lead to the sale of the flagship Hyundai Equus in the U.S. the following year, and the eventual formation of the Genesis brand as a whole in 2016.

All models were available with optional 4WD. The 3.8 V6 has a rated towing capacity of 5,000 pounds (2,300 kg), while the 4.6 V8 has a rated towing capacity of 7,500 pounds (3,400 kg).

2009-2010 were the only model years for the Borrego in the U.S., though most dealer inventory lasted until early 2011, and certain U.S. territories received extremely small numbers of the Borrego until 2014. The 2008 recession would see the American market shift more towards smaller, car-based, unibody-style crossover vehicles with smaller engines, due to rising petrol and oil prices. This would be seen as a very untimely arrival of the Borrego, when fuel prices were in excess of $4 USD/gallon. The Borrego's body-on-frame design would also be severely derided, due to the fact that it drove "like a full-size pickup truck," despite the fully independent suspension setup. The standard 3.8-litre V6 engine would eventually prove to get worse petrol mileage than the optional 4.6 liter V8 engine by a slightly noticeable margin. Only 22,700 Borregos would be built between May 2008 and January 2009 for the U.S. There were 68 Borregos built in U.S. territories between October 2009 and May 2014, making the total U.S. Borrego production consist of 22,768 units.

The Borrego's eventual replacement took shape in the form of the Telluride in 2019.

The smaller unibody Sorento crossover, built in West Point, Georgia, for the 2011 model year, served as the Borrego's eventual placeholder until the 2020 model year. The Sorento would offer the 3rd row seating of the Borrego, while lacking the V8 engine, the body-on-frame design, and the rear-wheel drive base of the Borrego.

The Telluride was eventually stepped in 2019 to fill the void that the Borrego left behind in size, though still lacking the V8 engine option and body-on-frame design of the Borrego. However, it does have the third-row seating like the Borrego and Sorento.

The rising oil and petrol prices would also see the 4.6 L Tau V8 being dropped from the Borrego/Mohave globally, after U.S. production ceased in 2010.

== First facelift (2016) ==
A facelift to the Mohave was launched in early 2016. Changes include improved safety as well as upgrades to interior and exterior trim packages. New features such as rear-side warning system, lane departure warning system, forward collision warning system, around-view monitoring system, day-time running lights, HID-headlights, LED taillights and foglights. The S-Line V6 received a minor update, incorporating an SCR (Selective Catalytic Reduction System) in order to meet with stringent EURO6 diesel emissions standards.

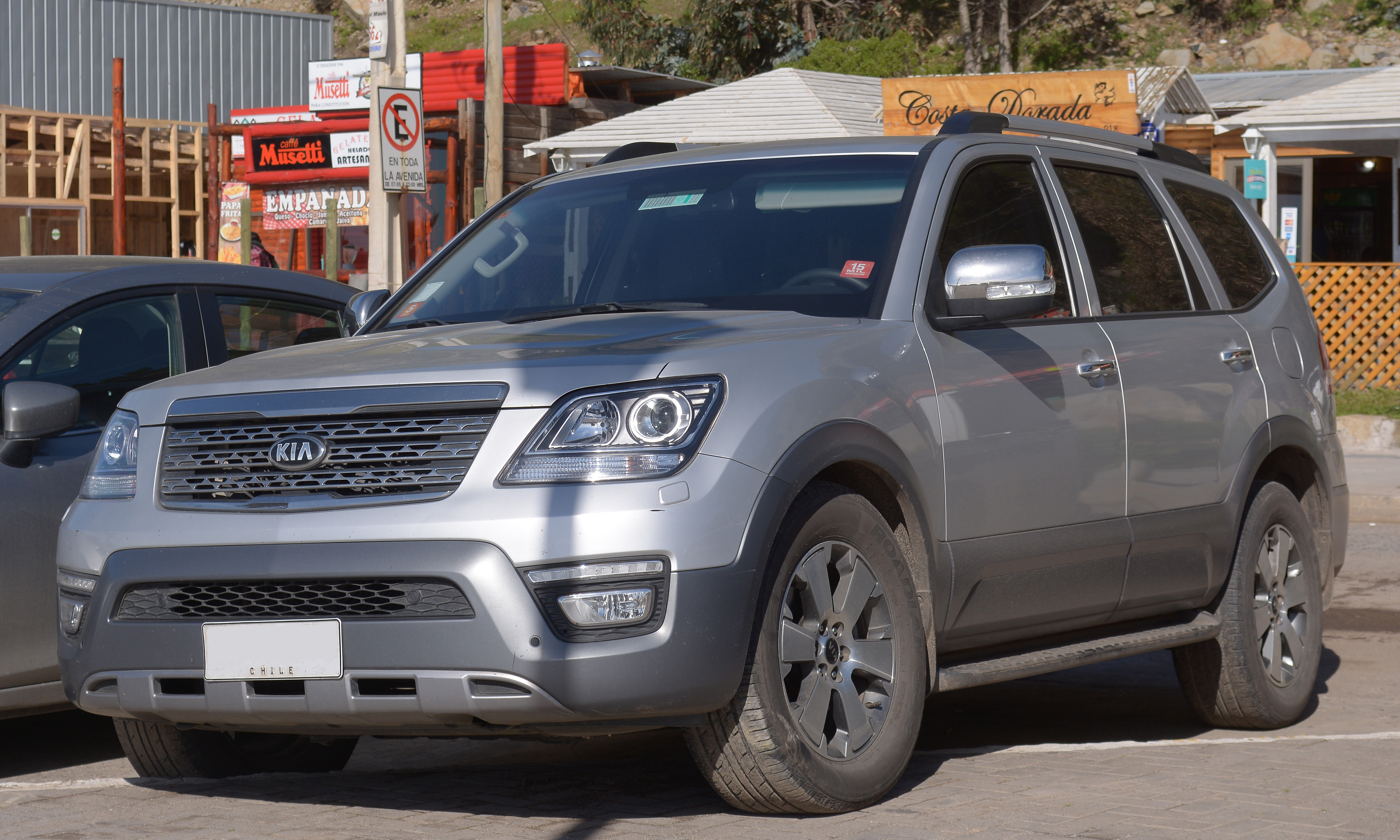
First facelift Mohave (Chile)

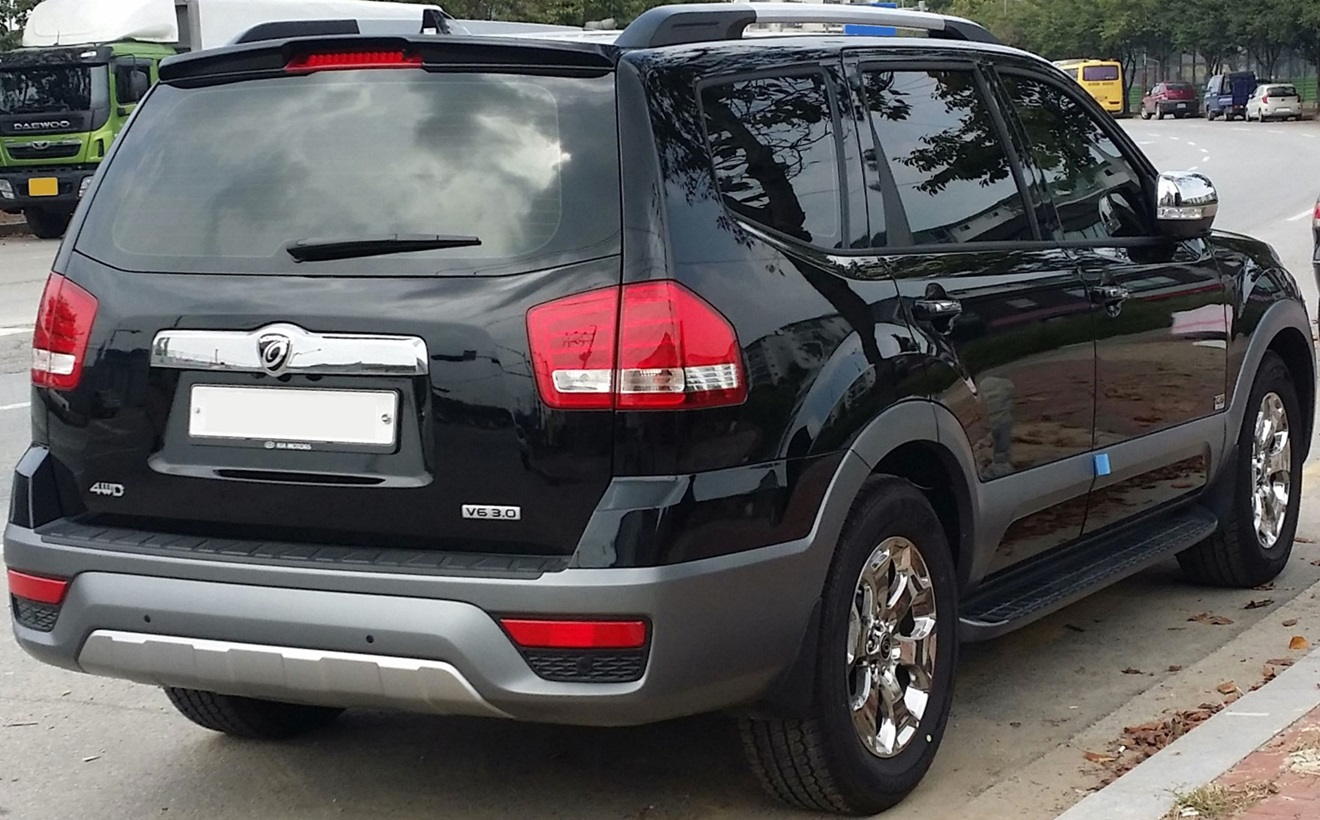
First facelift Mohave (Korea)

== FCEV Concept ==
The Kia Borrego FCEV was a concept car produced by Hyundai-Kia and first shown at the 2008 Los Angeles Auto Show. The concept was based on a pre-facelift production Borrego and features a fuel cell putting out 115 kW (154 hp), a companion super-capacitor rated at 450 volts (134 horsepower) and a 109 kW (146 hp) electric motor driving through the front wheels. The Borrego FCEV has a range of 820 km (510 mi) and can start in temperatures of −30 °C (−22 °F). A limited rollout had been scheduled between 2010 and 2012, as part of Kia's testing programme.

== Second facelift (2019) ==
Previewed during the 2019 Seoul Motor Show as the Masterpiece Concept, the second facelift Mohave was released in September 2019. Available in the Korean market, the second facelift was essentially a major overhaul to bring the Mohave in line with Kia's product lineup. Retaining the original body-on-frame chassis plus an improved S-II engine and powertrain package from the previous model, this iteration benefitted from features such as: a fully redesigned interior, heads-up display, full-LED headlights and LED taillights, electric tailgate, premium Lexicon-equipped sound system, and the ability to select up to six driving modes (Snow, Mud, Sand, Sport, Eco and Comfort).

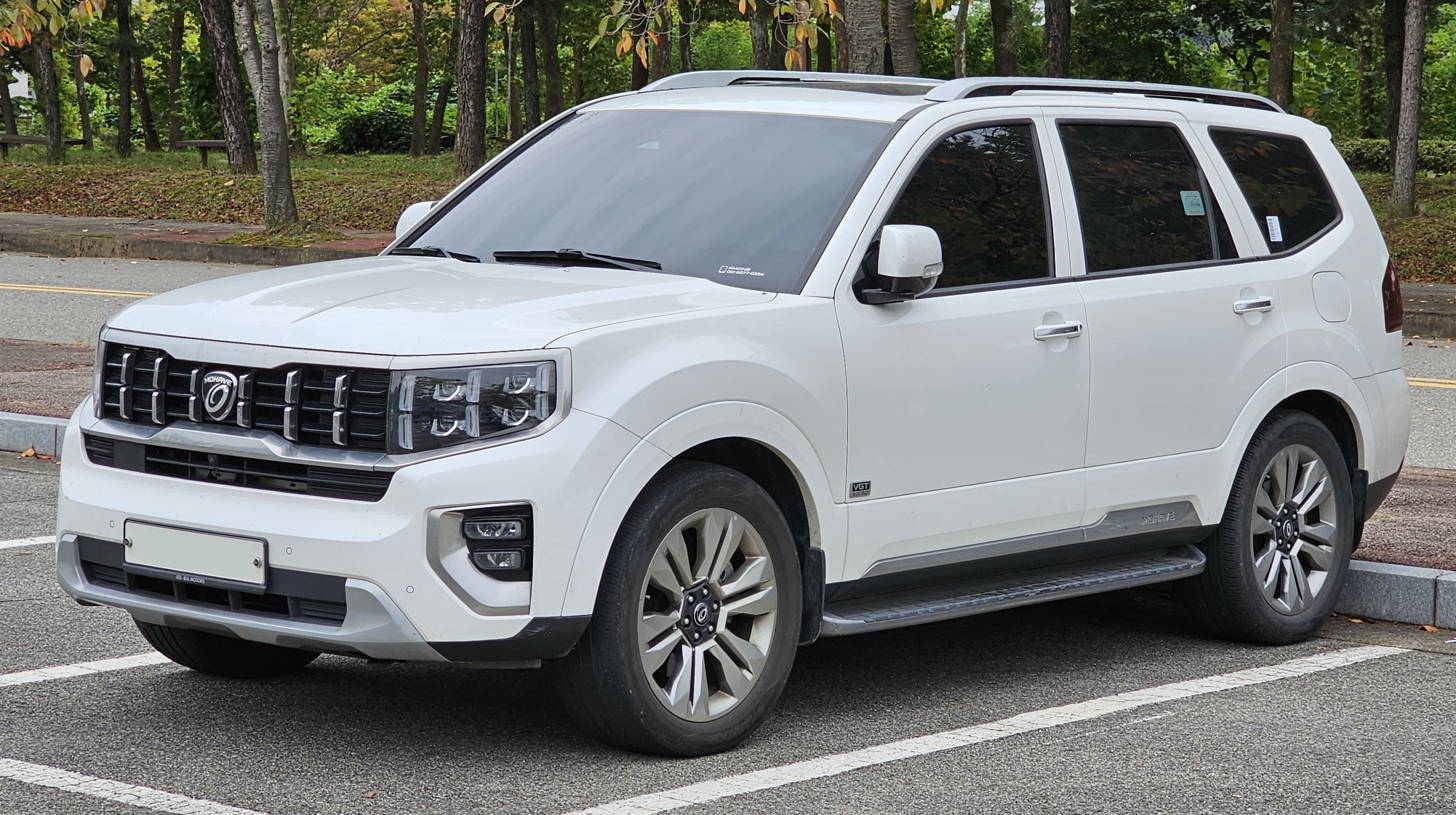
Second facelift Mohave (Korea)

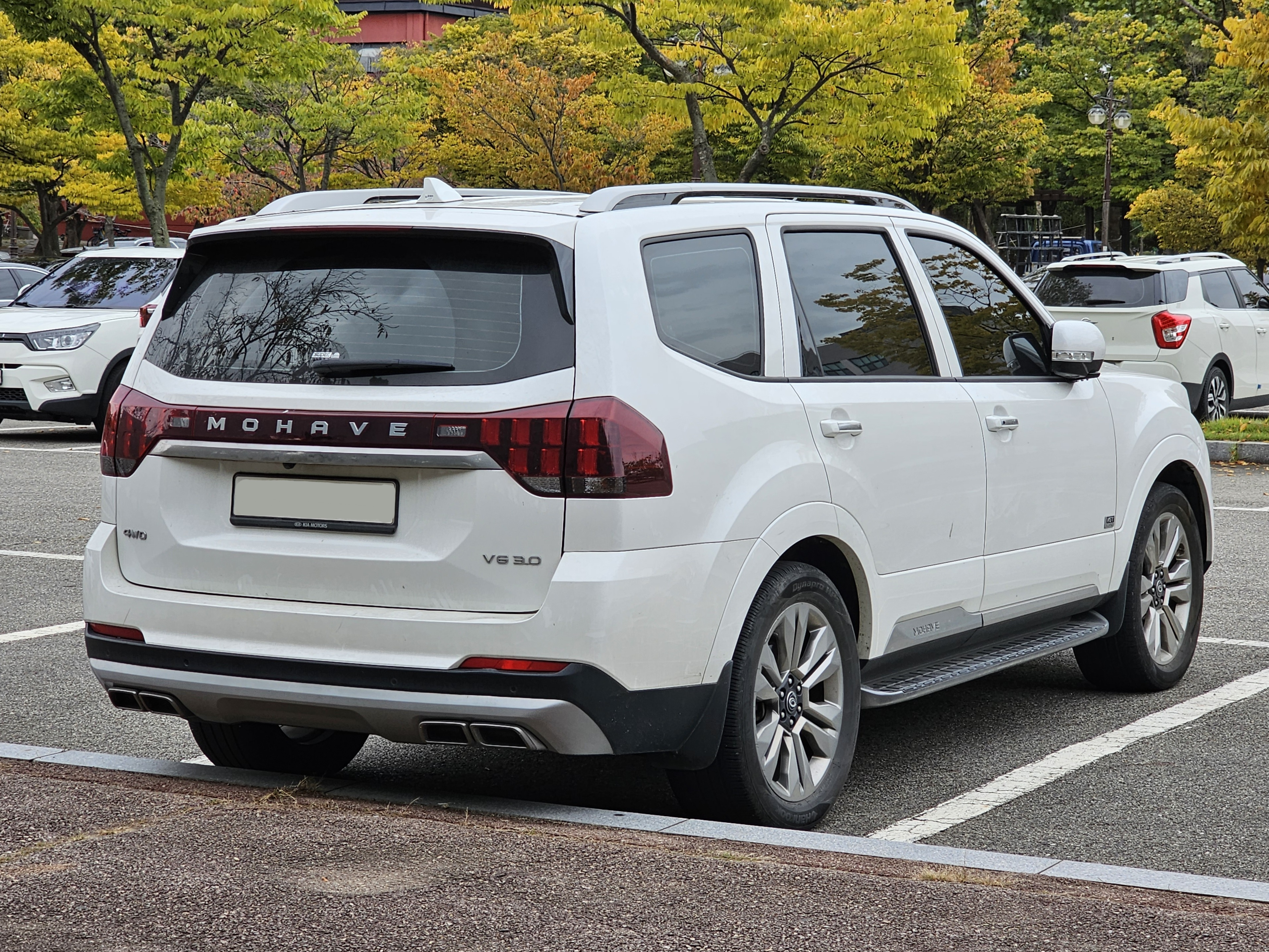
Second facelift Mohave (Korea)

== Awards ==
- Kia Borrego (Kia Mohave) has been selected as the “Best Kept Secret” in the Autobytel.com.
- Kia Borrego Awarded the "Best-in-Class Sport Utility Vehicle $25,000-$35,000" award as part of the New England Motor Press Association (NEMPA) 2009 Winter Vehicle Awards competition.
- Kia Borrego has been named the top-rated ‘SUV $25,000-$35,000’ in the Edmunds.com Consumers’ Top Rated Vehicle awards in the US. Borrego earned strong marks from consumers for its overall excellent value, along with impressive power and towing capacity, interior space, visibility, fuel economy and extensive list of standard features.

== Sales ==
| Year | South Korea |
|---|---|
| 2009 | 6,420 |
| 2010 | 5,651 |
| 2011 | 7,656 |
| 2012 | 7,360 |
| 2013 | 9,012 |
| 2014 | 10,581 |
| 2015 | 8,673 |
| 2016 | 15,059 |
| 2017 | 15,205 |
| 2018 | 7,837 |
| 2019 | 9,238 |
| 2020 | 655 |
| 2021 | 1,404 |
| 2022 | 11,633 |
| 2023 | 5,020 |
| 2024 | 2,294 |
