= Hyundai Genesis Coupe =

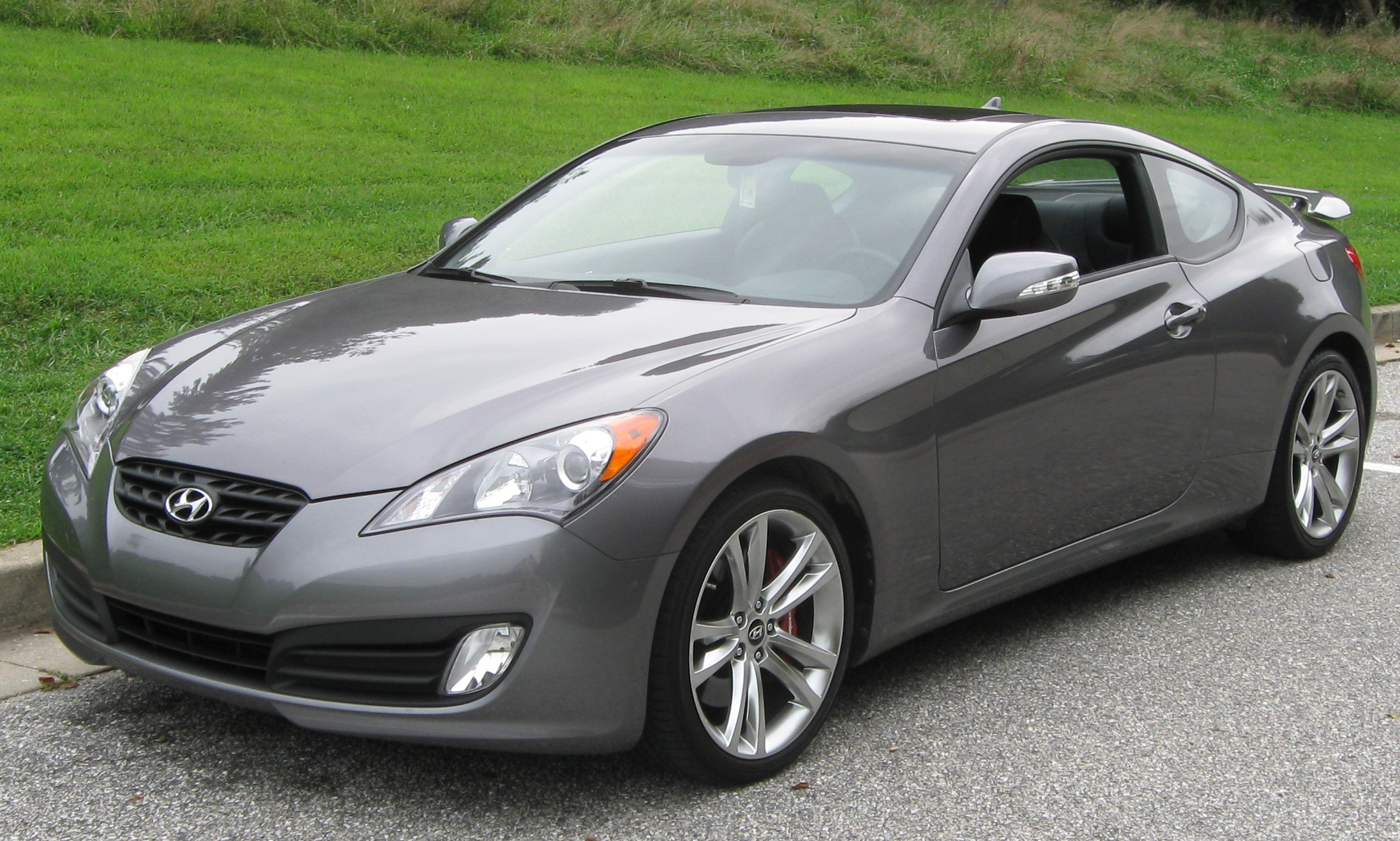

Overview
- Manufacturer: Hyundai Motor Company
- Model code: BK
- Also called: Hyundai Rohens Coupe (China)
- Production: 2008–2016
- Model years: 2009–2016 (Middle East); 2010–2016 (North America)
- Assembly: South Korea: Ulsan
- Designer: Eric Stoddard

Body and chassis
- Class: Sports car (S)
- Body style: 2-door coupé
- Layout: Front-engine, rear-wheel-drive
- Platform: Hyundai BH
- Related: Hyundai Genesis (BH)

Powertrain
- Engine: 2.0 L Theta II Turbo MPi I4; 3.8 L Lambda II RS MPi V6; 3.8 L Lambda II RS GDi V6
- Transmission: 6-speed M6VR1/M6VR2 manual; 5-speed automatic; 6-speed ZF 6HP19 automatic; 8-speed A8LR1 automatic

Dimensions
- Wheelbase: 2,820 mm (111.0 in)
- Length: 4,630 mm (182.3 in)
- Width: 1,865 mm (73.4 in)
- Height: 1,380 mm (54.3 in) (pre-facelift); 1,385 mm (54.5 in) (facelift)
- Curb weight: 1,494–1,550 kg (3,294–3,417 lb) (2.0T); 1,537–1,639 kg (3,389–3,613 lb) (3.8)

The Hyundai Genesis Coupe is a rear-wheel drive sports coupe from Hyundai Motor Company, first released on October 13, 2008, for the Korean market. It is Hyundai's first rear-wheel drive sports coupe, and shares its basic platform with the Hyundai Genesis luxury sedan.

The Genesis Coupe arrived in United States dealerships on February 26, 2009, as a 2010 model. Hyundai USA acting president and CEO John Krafcik described the Genesis Coupe as being designed "...to deliver a driving experience that challenges cars like the Infiniti G37."

With the launch of Genesis Motors as a standalone luxury brand, the Hyundai Genesis Coupe remained branded as a Hyundai and eventually was discontinued in 2016.

== 2008–2012 model ==
=== Pre-production ===
Photos of a heavily camouflaged Genesis Coupe prototype appeared on the internet as early as May 2007, fueling anticipation and speculation. The spy photos suggested that Hyundai's new coupe would be rear-wheel drive, as pictures of the engine bay showed a longitudinal engine orientation typical of front-engine, rear-drive vehicles. The pictures also showed a four-cylinder engine with a heat-wrapped turbocharger. Speculation on potential engines for the new coupe ranged from the turbocharged four-cylinder pictured to the Tau V8 that Hyundai had developed for the luxury-oriented Genesis.

Shortly before the 2007 Los Angeles Auto Show, more photos were leaked of an uncovered silver Genesis Coupe next to a silver Ford Mustang, presumed to be the Genesis Coupe's target competitor.

=== Initial release ===
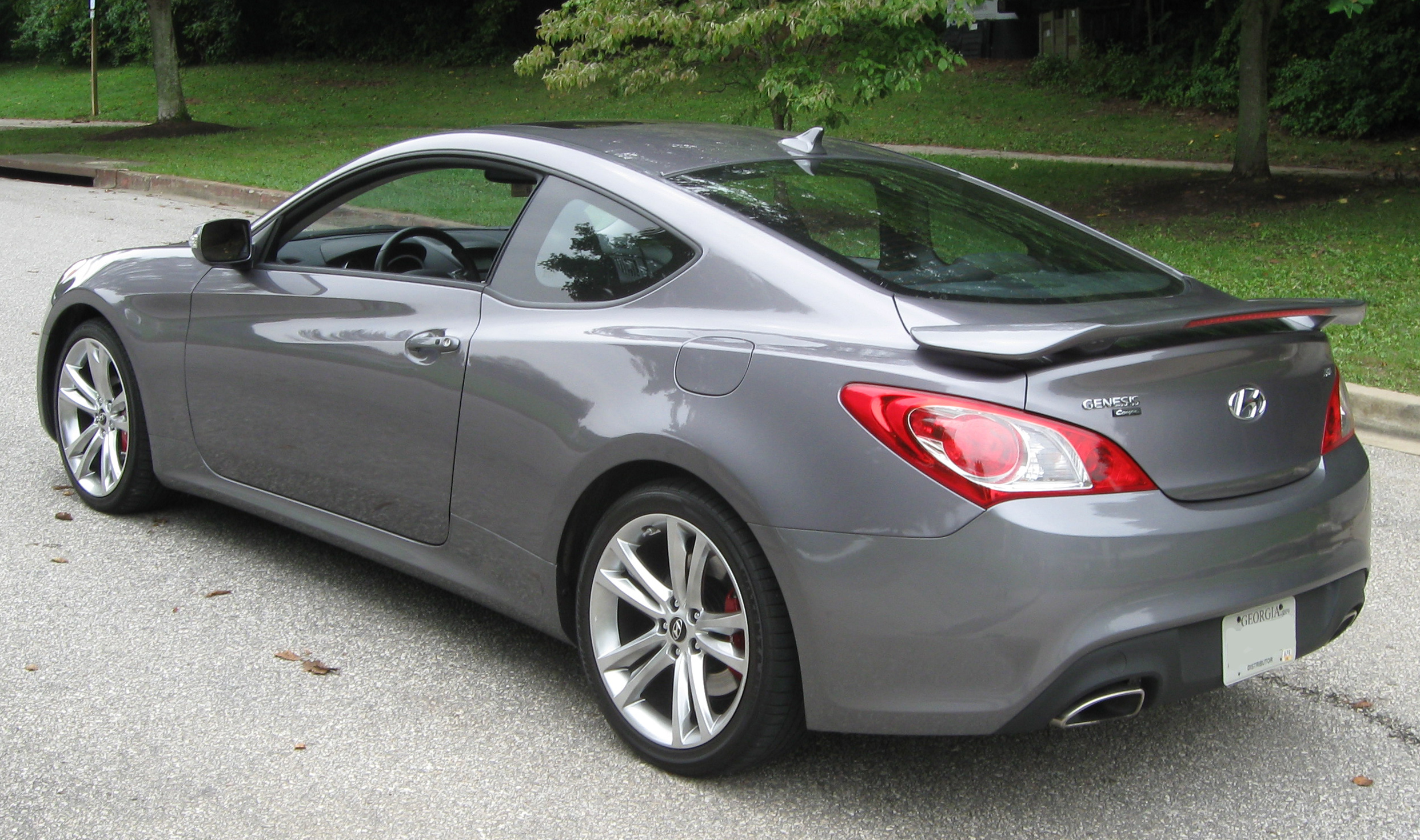
2010 Hyundai Genesis Coupe (US)

The production Genesis Coupe was unveiled at the 2008 New York International Auto Show, showcasing a red and a silver model. The unveiling was accompanied by a demonstration of the coupe's abilities with powerslides and burnouts. North American models went on sale in spring of 2009 as a 2010 model.

=== Trim levels ===
Genesis Coupe trims are based around two engine choices. Trim levels include: 2.0T Base, 2.0T R-Spec, 2.0T Premium, 2.0T Track (2010 only) (GT in Canada), 3.8 Base (2010), 3.8 R-Spec (2011+), 3.8 Grand Touring, and 3.8 Track (GT in Canada).

Base models start with keyless entry, steering wheel audio controls, Bluetooth hands-free, tire pressure monitoring system, cruise control, USB/iPod + Aux input, electronic stability control, ABS, electronic brake force distribution, 18-inch wheels, and strut bar. The 2.0T Base used a 6-speed manual transmission or 5-speed automatic while the 3.8 Base used a 6-speed manual or automatic transmission. The 3.8 Base (only for 2010) adds black leather interior and light-up "Genesis" door sill plates.

The 2.0T Premium and 3.8 Grand Touring add a touch screen infotainment system with navigation, keyless entry with push-button start, power adjustable driver seat, heated front seats (3.8L US only), leather interior, 360-watt 10-speaker system, automatic headlights, sunroof/moonroof, and electrochromic dimming mirror with compass. The 3.8 Grand Touring is the only model with brown leather instead of black and ultrasonic rear parking sensors. The 3.8 Grand Touring also receives fog lights.

For enthusiasts, the R-spec models come with 19-inch wheels, Brembo brakes, a Torsen limited-slip differential, a stiffer suspension, summer-only Bridgestone Potenza RE050A tires, and factory-supplied front camber bolts (need to be installed). However the R-spec models lose the Premium / Grand Touring features for weight reduction: Bluetooth hands-free, automatic headlights, cruise control, trip computer, chrome interior accents, steering wheel audio controls, and only come with the 6-speed manual transmission. The Genesis Coupe R-Spec trims are available with a base price $3,000 less than the Track models.

The Track trims combine the enthusiast R-spec features with the Premium / Grand Touring features. In addition, the trims further add HID headlights, fog lights with DRLs, and rear spoiler.

=== Regional differences ===
While the Genesis Coupe that is released in North America will look the same as the Korean version, the suspension setup is stiffer according to American demographic.

Hyundai Canada offers a proximity key for all V6 models, push button start or side-mirror marker lights on the 3.8L models and no spoiler on either the 2.0T or 3.8L V6 (US track models are the only trims equipped with spoilers). In fall of 2009, Hyundai began Genesis production with Navigation systems.

In some countries Hyundai Genesis Coupe will also be sold as Hyundai Genesis R-Spec, which comes with both the 3.8-liter and 2.0T engine and features some sport-oriented options.

=== Customized versions ===
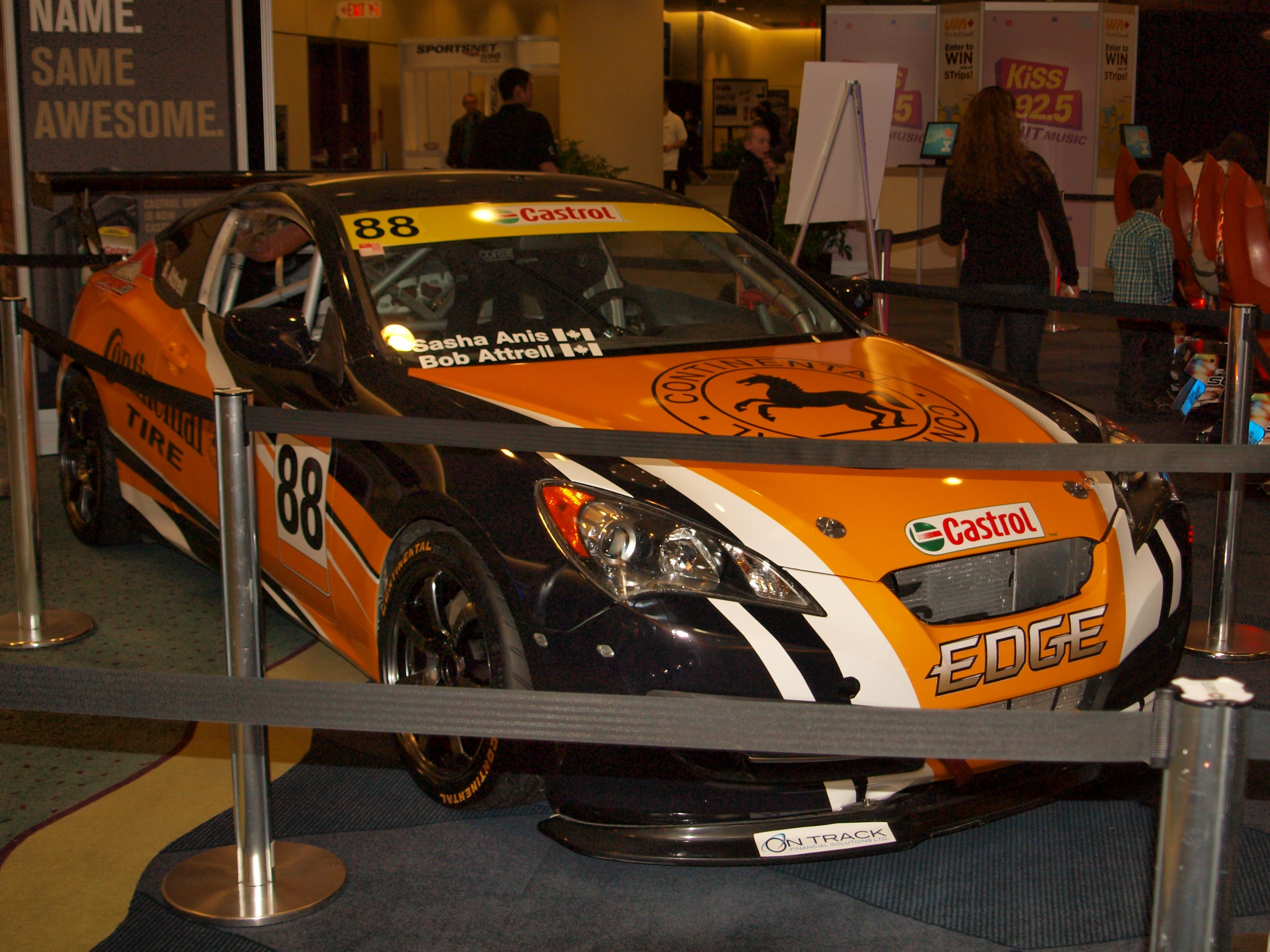
Customised Genesis coupé race car

==== Hyundai RMR "Art of Speed" Genesis Coupe 2.0t (2008) ====
The RMR Genesis is a version of the Genesis Coupe 2.0T with an RMR turbo kit, HKS sequential transmission, K&W coil over suspension, silver and black body colour scheme, RMR wide body kit, functional hood scoop, carbon fiber wing, Enkei racing wheels with Bridgestone Potenza RE-01 tires, Brembo brake calipers, Sparco steering wheel and seats, eight-point roll cage, and an RMR carbon fiber dashboard.

The vehicle was unveiled at the 2008 SEMA Show.

==== Genesis Coupe 2.0T R-Spec (2009–) ====
The R-spec 2.0T is a version of the Genesis Coupe 2.0T Track with fewer factory options, resulting in it being 68 pounds lighter than the 2.0T Base/Premium models.

The vehicle was unveiled at the 2009 SEMA Show.

==== RM460 Genesis Coupe (2009) ====
The RM460 is a Genesis Coupe with a 4.6-liter Hyundai Tau engine V8, built by Rhys Millen Racing. The engine is mounted behind the passenger compartment to become a mid-engine rear wheel drive (MR) platform. The numerous modifications are: an increased compression ratio to 11.0:1, engine management system by AEM, Mendeola five-speed sequential transmission, original MacPherson strut dual-link front suspension and a five-link rear suspension, with a KW coilover component; HRE 560 Series 20-inch wheels with Toyo T1R tires, StopTech brakes, RMR Signature Edition kit, a carbon fiber spoiler and custom carbon fiber rear hatch, custom RM ONYX HD paint from BASF, Sparco Chrono sports seats, Sparco Alcantara and carbon fiber interior panels, Infinity Kappa Perfect Speakers and power amplifier.

The vehicle was unveiled at the 2009 SEMA Show.

==== RM500 Genesis Coupe (2011) ====
The RM500 is a Genesis Coupe with a 5.0-liter Tau V8 engine rated at 450 hp, built by Rhys Millen Racing. It included: custom RMR custom stainless exhaust with Greddy rear section muffler and titanium tips, oil cooler, rear differential cooler, RMR Custom Adapter Plate, RMR Custom Light Weight Clutch & Flywheel, K&N Panel Filter, AEM Engine Management System, Brembo Carbon Ceramic Rotors (Front – 15.5-inch, Rear – 15-inch), Brembo Six Piston Front Calipers Four Piston Rear, HRE 793-RS II-Spoke Rims (Front – 19x8.5, Rear – 19x9.5), Hankook Ventus V12 Tires (Front – 245/40ZR19, Rear – 275/35ZR19), RMR Interior Suede Trip Package, Sparco Chrono Sport Seats with RMR Accents, Sparco Track Sliders, RMR Seat Brackets, Sparco Tecno Leather Shift Knob, RMR 1-inch Steering Column Extension, RMR Carbon Front Lip, RMR Carbon Side Skirts, RMR Carbon Rear Diffuser, RMR Carbon Three Piece Spoiler, RMR Carbon Grille, RMR Carbon Overlay Roof, RMR Carbon Fog Light Vents with Brake Ducts, RMR Yellow Fog Light Covers.

The vehicle was unveiled at the 2011 SEMA Show.

=== Motorsport ===
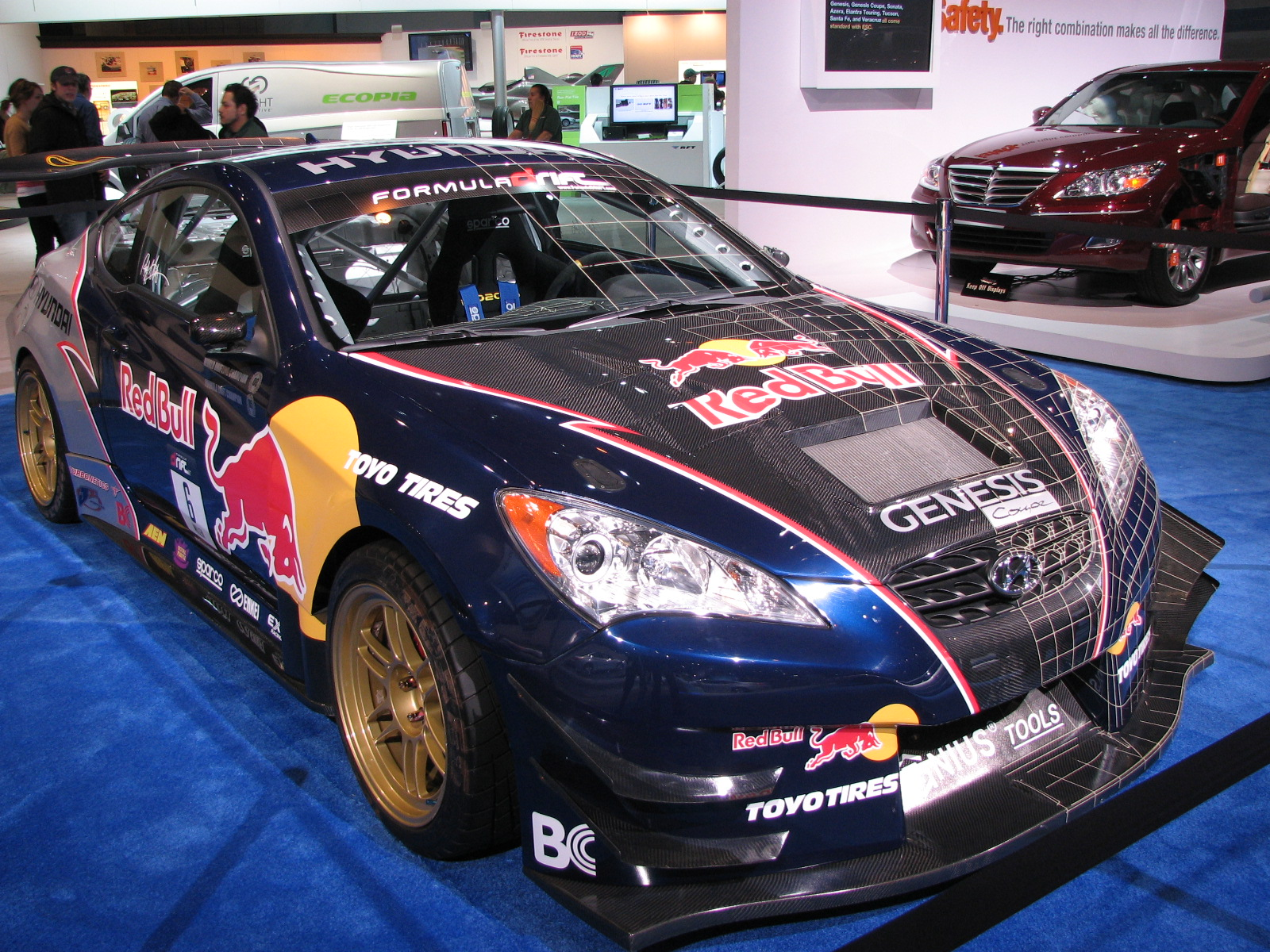
Hyundai Genesis Coupe drift car, driven by Rhys Millen

The Hyundai Genesis Coupe competed at the Formula Drift Professional Drifting Championship, the Pikes Peak International Hill Climb and select Redline Time Attack Series events in 2009 – thanks to a joint venture between Hyundai and racing champion Rhys Millen, who will drive the Red Bull-sponsored race car on those events. Millen's V8 engine is running with mostly stock internals and its original Hyundai's 5.0-liter displacement.

GoGoGear.com Racing started racing a Genesis Coupe in 2012 in the United States Touring Car Championship and won the championship in 2014 in a 3.8 liter V6 Genesis Coupe. They became the first team to win a road racing championship ever in a Hyundai in the USA. In 2015, the team finished second in the championship.

In July 2009, Millen and the Genesis Coupe set a new record for two-wheel drive production-based cars at Pikes Peak.

In June 2011, Rhys Millen set a new record for 2WD Time Attack using the same Genesis Coupe with a time of 11:04.912.

== Facelift (2011) ==
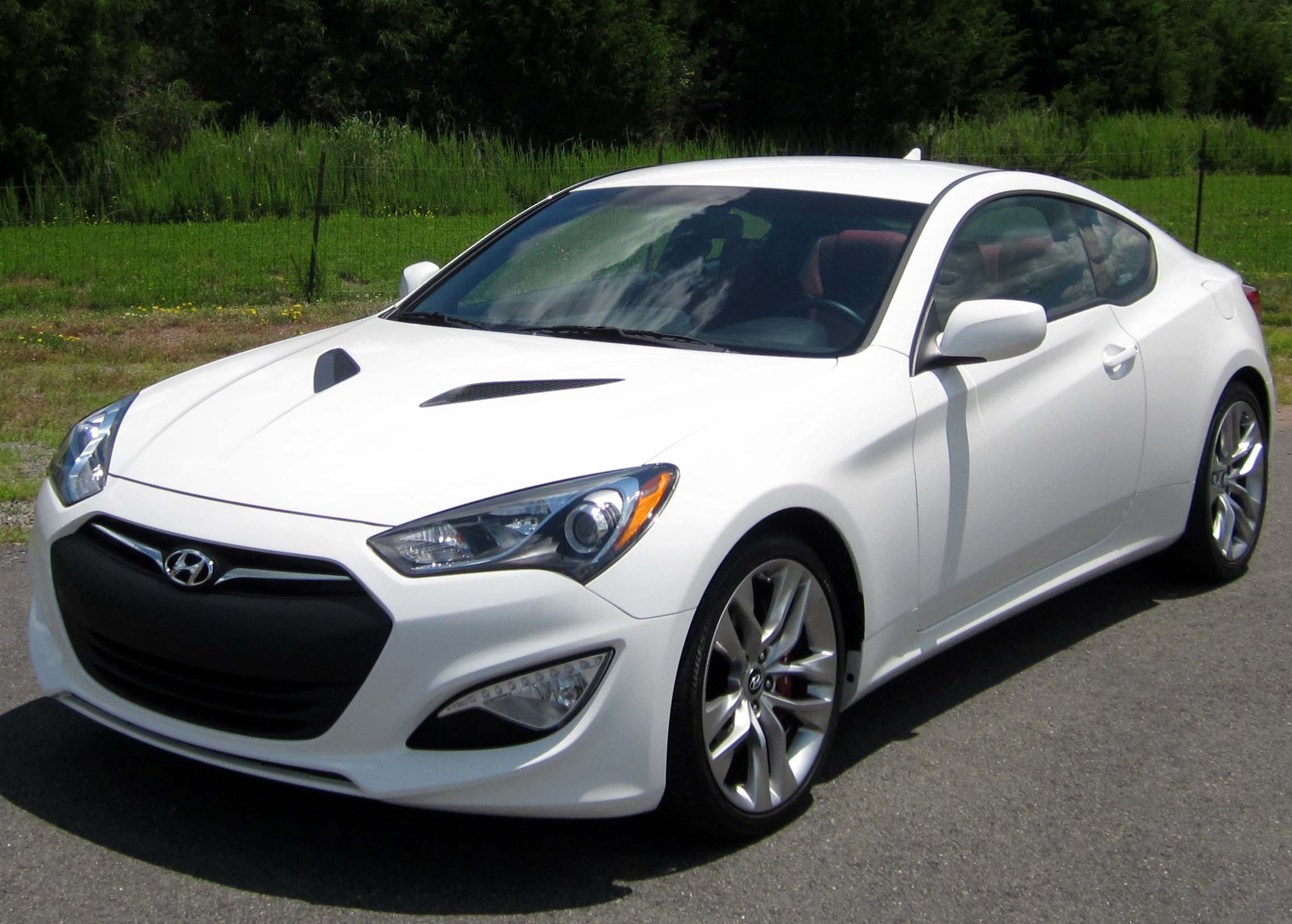
2013 Hyundai Genesis Coupe 3.8 R-Spec (US)

The Korean model was unveiled at the 2011 Korea Speed Festival in Yeongam, South Korea.

The North American model was unveiled at the 2012 Detroit North American International Auto Show as a 2013 model year vehicle. The Lambda MPi engine was replaced by the Lambda GDi engine.

The front bumper and hood received a styling revision that incorporates Hyundai's fluidic corporate design language a la Veloster. Transmission choices include an 8-speed automatic transmission with paddle-shifters or a 6-speed manual transmission.

In response to criticisms about materials quality from reviewers and owners, Hyundai significantly improved materials quality for the new model. New features include a leather handbrake handle, plasmacluster air filtering, red leather interior option, LED accents above the foglights, and LED taillights.

=== Exterior ===
The Genesis Coupe was initially available in one of 10 different colors: Karussell White, Bathurst Black, Aqua Mineral Blue, Interlagos Yellow, Tsukuba Red, Mirabeau Blue, Silverstone, Monaco White, Lime Rock Green and Nordschleife Gray. Color options varied year to year, region to region and sometimes locked to specific trim levels, such as Interlagos Yellow was only available in the North American market on the highest trims for 3.8 equipped vehicles and eventually discontinued for 2013MY but was still available in select markets on other trim levels and engine options. For 2013 Mirabeau Blue was discontinued and replaced with Shoreline Blue, then again in 2014 was replaced by Ibiza Blue.

=== Trim levels ===
Genesis Coupe trims have minor changes from the first generation. Trim levels include: 2.0T Base, 2.0T R-Spec, 2.0T Premium, 3.8 R-Spec (2011+), 3.8 Grand Touring, and 3.8 Track (renamed Ultimate 2014+). Carbon-coated synchronizer rings and hill-start assist were added to the manual transmission for the 2014 model year, which also saw downshift rev-matching system added for the automatic transmission.

=== Motorsport ===
RMR Genesis Coupe entered the 2012 Formula Drift series.

=== Reception ===
Reception to the revised Genesis Coupe has been mixed. Edmunds praised the 3.8 R-Spec as "the most interesting car that Hyundai makes". They also praised the improved transmission, uprated engine and more balanced suspension, but lamented "we could get into a V6-equipped Mustang or Camaro for less money". They also criticized the slow-moving tachometer and the brief loss of power after high-rpm upshifts.

Motor Trend was critical of the revised 2.0T R-Spec, placing it last in a comparison test between it, a Ford Mustang V6, a Volkswagen Golf GTI, a Scion FR-S, a Subaru BRZ, and a Mazda MX-5 Miata. They praised its smooth ride and extra power, but criticized its "peaky power delivery", vague shifter and interior ambience.

When Car and Driver took a 2013 Genesis Coupe 3.8 R-Spec to Virginia International Raceway for its yearly Lightning Lap time trial, they posted a time of 3:13.9 around VIR's Grand West configuration, 0.1 second slower than the 306-hp 2011 Genesis Coupe 3.8 R-Spec and slower than the Mitsubishi Lancer Evolution, Ford Mustang V6, Chevrolet Cobalt SS and Nissan NISMO 370Z. They were unsettled by its tendency to power oversteer, and its brake fade.

=== Customized versions ===
==== Cosworth Genesis Racing Series (2012) ====
It is a version of the Genesis Coupe Lambda 3.8 V6 GDi developed in association with Cosworth, with engine power increased to 389 hp at 6400 rpm and 325 lb ft of torque at 5100 rpm, achieved through improved thermal management, optimization of induction and exhaust systems, enhanced engine control parameters, and a Cosworth intake and high-flow exhaust. It also has a number of other Cosworth CGRS parts including a new steering wheel, shift knob and boot, pedals, Two-Tone Sport Seats, Two-Tone Interior Treatment, Satin/Gloss Blue body color, full front replacement bumper w/ integrated carbon fiber brake ducts, carbon fiber front splitter, carbon fiber side skirt lip, carbon fiber diffuser, integrated trunk spoiler, Cosworth CGRS Edition Wheels, Cosworth CGRS logo and hood graphics.

The vehicle was unveiled at the 2012 SEMA Show.

==== Genesis Coupe R-Spec by ARK (2012) ====
It is a version of the Genesis Coupe Lambda 3.8 V6 GDi developed in association with ARK Performance, with increased engine power to 395 hp at 6800 rpm and 340 lb.-ft. of torque at 5400 rpm, ARK performance intake system, ARK performance oil cooler, ARK performance lightweight pulley kit, BTRcc Blueprinting, Brian Crower 4.2 Stroker Kit, JE Pistons, BC 4340 Crankshaft, BC 4340 Connecting Rods, ARK performance R-Spec ceramic-coated headers, JPM Coachworks custom interior, Sparco steering wheel L575, Sparco Pro ADV racing seats – red, Cusco 8-point chromoly roll cage, ARK-ADRO FL carbon hood, ARK-ADRO rear diffuser, ARK performance SFX rear overfenders, ARK performance CFX carbon deck lid, APR GT300 carbon wing with mount, ARK carbon plate clutch kit, ARK dual mass flywheel, Cusco type RS 1.5/2-way limited-slip differential, Yokohama ADVAN RS2 tires, Nitto NT05 wheels, Six-piston Big Brake kit F/R, ARK carbon brake pads, ARK stainless steel brake lines, ARK performance DTP coilover system, Cusco suspension bars, arms and control rods.

The vehicle was unveiled at the 2012 SEMA Show.

==== Bisimoto Engineering Genesis Coupe (2013) ====
It is a version of the Genesis Coupe Lambda 3.8 V6 GDi developed in association with Bisimoto Engineering, with increased engine power to 1022 horsepower, steel connecting rods, intake gasket, injectors, level 2.4 camshafts, twin Bisimoto/Turbonetics BTX6162 turbochargers, Godzilla blow-off valve, dual RG45 wastegate, Arias forged pistons, Golden Eagle sleeves, WPC metal surface treatment, Supertech valvetrain, Vibrant VanJen clamps and stainless hardware, Magnafuel 750 fuel pump, ARP head, main, and wheel studs; Portflow custom headwork, AEM Infinity EMS, custom smart ignition coils, NGK Iridium spark plugs, Puröl Elite synthetic oil, Spearco intercooler, Griffin radiator, Kinsler fuel filters, Bisimoto-spec Action Ironman clutch, Bisimoto roll cage, ST coilover suspension and anti-roll bars, Drive Shaft Shop 5.9 Axles and driveshaft, Incurve 20x9.5 and 20x11 aluminum wheels, Toyo Tires R888 R-Compound tires, Buddy Club racing seats and Takata Race harness, Bisimoto reservoir socks, Racepack IQ3 dash, Bisimoto oil cap, Odyssey dry cell battery, Rywire mil-spec harness, G&J braided lines.

The vehicle was unveiled at the 2013 SEMA Show.

== Engine, Transmission, and Common Specs ==
Initially, the Genesis Coupe was available with two engines. The standard engine is a 2.0T Theta turbocharged 4-cylinder producing 210–213 PS (154–157 kW; 207–210 hp) and 30.5–32.5 kg⋅m (299–319 N⋅m; 221–235 lbf⋅ft) torque, with an optional 3.8 L Lambda V6 engine producing 303–316 PS (223–232 kW; 299–312 hp) and 36.8 kg⋅m (361 N⋅m; 266 lbf⋅ft) torque.

The 4-cylinder turbocharged engine shares little to nothing with the Mitsubishi Evo X. Both engines are the result of the Global Engine Manufacturing Alliance, a joint venture among Hyundai, Mitsubishi, and Chrysler, with Hyundai's engine using a different computer from Siemens. Interesting features of the engine include oil squirters under the pistons to keep them cooler. The TD04-13t turbo from the factory flows 10 psi (0.69 bar) under full load, and reduces to 7 psi (0.48 bar) at shift points before respooling.

A 6-speed Magna Powertrains-derived M6VR-series manual transmission is standard equipment, with an optional 5- or ZF 6-speed automatic (depending on engine choice).

For the facelift models, both engines got upgraded, the new 2.0T now produces 275–279 PS (202–205 kW; 271–275 hp) and 38 kg⋅m (373 N⋅m; 275 lbf⋅ft) torque on premium fuel due to a bigger twinscroll turbo, while the 3.8 L (3,778 cc) now produces 348–353 PS (256–260 kW; 343–348 hp) and 40.8 kg⋅m (400 N⋅m; 295 lbf⋅ft) torque on premium fuel thanks to the Gasoline direct injection (GDI). The optional automatic transmission was also upgraded to a 8-speed for both engine choices.

For the 2015 model year, the 2.0T engine option is no longer available in North America with the 3.8 L (3,778 cc) becoming the only available engine choice.

Model	Year	Transmission	Power	Torque	0–100 km/h 0-62 mph (Official)	Top speed
2.0 Theta II RS T-MPi	2008–2011	6-speed manual 5-speed automatic	210–213 PS (154–157 kW; 207–210 hp) @ 6,000 rpm	30.5–32.5 kg⋅m (299–319 N⋅m; 221–235 lbf⋅ft) @ 2,000–4,500 rpm	8.0s (Manual); 8.3s (Automatic)	230 km/h (143 mph)
2.0 Theta II RS T-MPi	2011–2014	6-speed manual 8-speed automatic	260–264 PS (191–194 kW; 256–260 hp) @ 6,000 rpm 275–279 PS (202–205 kW; 271–275 hp) @ 6,000 rpm	36 kg⋅m (353 N⋅m; 260 lbf⋅ft) @ 2,000–4,500 rpm 38 kg⋅m (373 N⋅m; 275 lbf⋅ft) @ 2,000–4,500 rpm	7.4s (Manual); 7.2s (Automatic)	245 km/h (152 mph) (Gov.)
3.8 Lambda II RS MPI	2008–2011	6-speed manual 6-speed automatic	303–310 PS (223–228 kW; 299–306 hp) @ 6,300 rpm 316 PS (232 kW; 312 hp) @ 6,300 rpm	36.8 kg⋅m (361 N⋅m; 266 lbf⋅ft) @ 4,700 rpm	6.4s (Manual); 6.3s (Automatic)	245 km/h (152 mph) (Gov.)
3.8 Lambda II RS MPI	2011–2015	6-speed manual 8-speed automatic	303–310 PS (223–228 kW; 299–306 hp) @ 6,300 rpm 316 PS (232 kW; 312 hp) @ 6,300 rpm	36.8 kg⋅m (361 N⋅m; 266 lbf⋅ft) @ 4,700 rpm	6.4s (Manual); 6.3s (Automatic)	245 km/h (152 mph) (Gov.)
3.8 Lambda II RS GDI	2013–2016	6-speed manual 8-speed automatic	348–353 PS (256–260 kW; 343–348 hp) @ 6,400 rpm	40.8 kg⋅m (400 N⋅m; 295 lbf⋅ft) @ 5,300 rpm	6.1s (Manual); 5.9s (Automatic)	260 km/h (162 mph) (Gov.)

In some regions such as the Middle East and the Philippines the 3.8 L engine still comes with the old MPi version making 299 hp (223 kW; 303 PS), starting with 2016 model the 3.8 L offered in these regions are now the GDI version making 348 PS (256 kW; 343 hp).

=== Chassis ===
Optional equipment includes a Torsen limited-slip differential and four-piston Brembo brakes with 13.4 in (340 mm) rotors in the front and 13 in (330 mm) in the rear. 18-inch wheels are standard, while optional 19-inch wheels using 225/40 tires in the front and 245/40 in the rear are packaged together with the Brembo brake upgrade.

According to Hyundai, the Genesis Coupe has a 24% stiffer bending rigidity than the BMW E46 M3 (2001–2006).

=== Dimensions ===
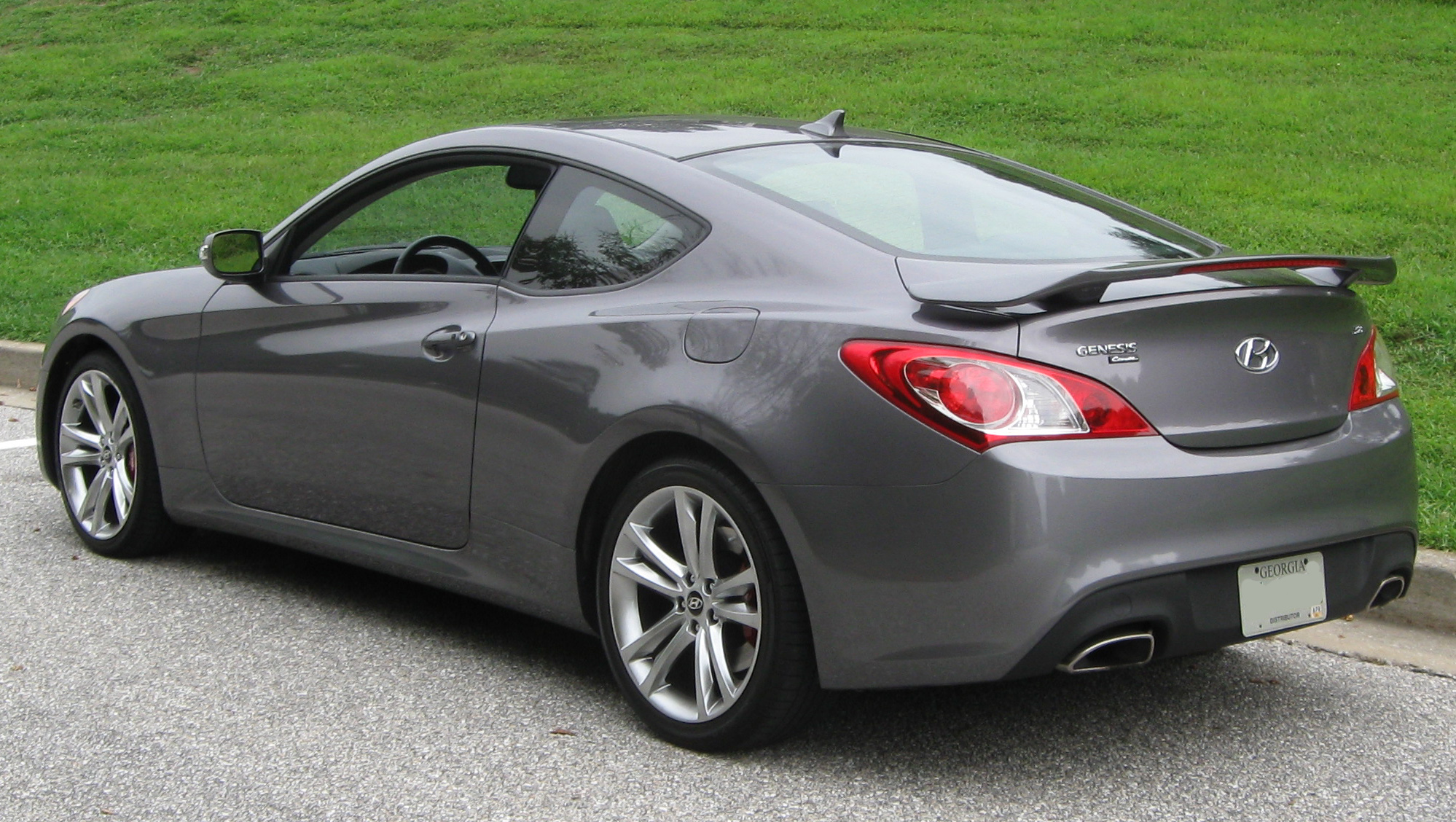
2010 Hyundai Genesis Coupe 3.8 Track (US)

The car's wheelbase is 2,820 mm (111.0 in), with an overall length of 4,630 mm (182.3 in), width of 1,865 mm (73.4 in), and height of 1,380–1,385 mm (54.3–54.5 in). The curb weight of the coupe is 1,537–1,639 kg (3,389–3,613 lb) for the V6 and 1,494–1,550 kg (3,294–3,417 lb) for the 4-cylinder.

=== Marketing ===
Hyundai took an aggressive stance on their marketing for the new release of this car with Rhys Millen drifting the car to music by Billy Corgan during a Super Bowl advertisement. They also launched the website edityourown.com that allowed users to create a video that allowed the promotion of the car. This was done previously by other car manufacturers, although none promised the final edit to be seen on TV as well as winning a cash prize along with the new car as Hyundai has.

Hyundai Genesis (coupe and the four-door saloon version) have appeared in the TV series Leverage, driven by the main characters. Hyundai had a 3-year partnership with the TV show Burn Notice and the Genesis Coupe was featured prominently in many episodes. It also made an appearance in the eighth season of the TV series 24 as one of the pursuit vehicles driven by Jack Bauer.

The song FOL from The Smashing Pumpkins, used in Genesis Coupe Super Bowl ad, was freely available by supplying e-mail address to Hyundai.

A 30-second Genesis Coupe R-Spec ad titled "Think Fast", was premiered during fourth quarter of Super Bowl XLVI.

As part of the Canadian market launch, a Sasquatch commercial titled 'Country Drive' was produced. In addition, there were 9 "Sasquatch on Set" clips to show what it's like working with yeti.

On September 20, 2012, the game developer Gameloft released a racing simulator for the Android phone platform, under their established GT Racing title series, featuring the 2011 Genesis Coupe as well as their concept I-oniq hybrid car.

The Genesis Coupe appeared in the Asphalt 7: Heat video game.

=== US Fuel economy ===
EPA MPG Estimates
Model	Model Year	Transmission	City	Highway
2.0 Theta II RS	2009–12	6-speed manual	21 mpg_{‑US} (11 L/100 km; 25 mpg_{‑imp})	30 mpg_{‑US} (7.8 L/100 km; 36 mpg_{‑imp})
2.0 Theta II RS	2009–12	5-speed automatic	20 mpg_{‑US} (12 L/100 km; 24 mpg_{‑imp})	30 mpg_{‑US} (7.8 L/100 km; 36 mpg_{‑imp})
2.0 Theta II RS	2013	6-speed manual	21 mpg_{‑US} (11 L/100 km; 25 mpg_{‑imp})	29 mpg_{‑US} (8.1 L/100 km; 35 mpg_{‑imp})
2.0 Theta II RS	2013	8-speed automatic	17 mpg_{‑US} (14 L/100 km; 20 mpg_{‑imp})	27 mpg_{‑US} (8.7 L/100 km; 32 mpg_{‑imp})
2.0 Theta II RS	2014	6-speed manual	19 mpg_{‑US} (12 L/100 km; 23 mpg_{‑imp})	27 mpg_{‑US} (8.7 L/100 km; 32 mpg_{‑imp})
2.0 Theta II RS	2014	8-speed automatic	17 mpg_{‑US} (14 L/100 km; 20 mpg_{‑imp})	26 mpg_{‑US} (9.0 L/100 km; 31 mpg_{‑imp})
3.8 Lambda II RS	2009–12	6-speed manual	17 mpg_{‑US} (14 L/100 km; 20 mpg_{‑imp})	26 mpg_{‑US} (9.0 L/100 km; 31 mpg_{‑imp})
3.8 Lambda II RS	2009–12	6-speed automatic	17 mpg_{‑US} (14 L/100 km; 20 mpg_{‑imp})	27 mpg_{‑US} (8.7 L/100 km; 32 mpg_{‑imp})
3.8 Lambda II RS	2013	6-speed manual	18 mpg_{‑US} (13 L/100 km; 22 mpg_{‑imp})	27 mpg_{‑US} (8.7 L/100 km; 32 mpg_{‑imp})
3.8 Lambda II RS	2013–16	8-speed automatic	16 mpg_{‑US} (15 L/100 km; 19 mpg_{‑imp})	25 mpg_{‑US} (9.4 L/100 km; 30 mpg_{‑imp})
3.8 Lambda II RS	2014–15	6-speed manual	16 mpg_{‑US} (15 L/100 km; 19 mpg_{‑imp})	24 mpg_{‑US} (9.8 L/100 km; 29 mpg_{‑imp})
3.8 Lambda II RS	2016	6-speed manual	17 mpg_{‑US} (14 L/100 km; 20 mpg_{‑imp})	24 mpg_{‑US} (9.8 L/100 km; 29 mpg_{‑imp})

Tank size is 65 L (17.2 US gal).

== Sales ==
Calendar Year	South Korea	United States	Canada	Europe
2008	2,016	0	0	0
2009	6,999	8,285	2,407	0
2010	2,771	12,674	3,113	159
2011	1,568	14,148	2,809	1,708
2012	1,261	11,286	1,773	978
2013	385	12,526	1,813	293
2014	329	10,859	1,514	66
2015	243	6,457	1,029	8
2016	65	4,781	952	0
2017	0	1,055	144	0
2018	0	2	0	0

== See also ==
- Hyundai Genesis
