= Hyundai Genesis =

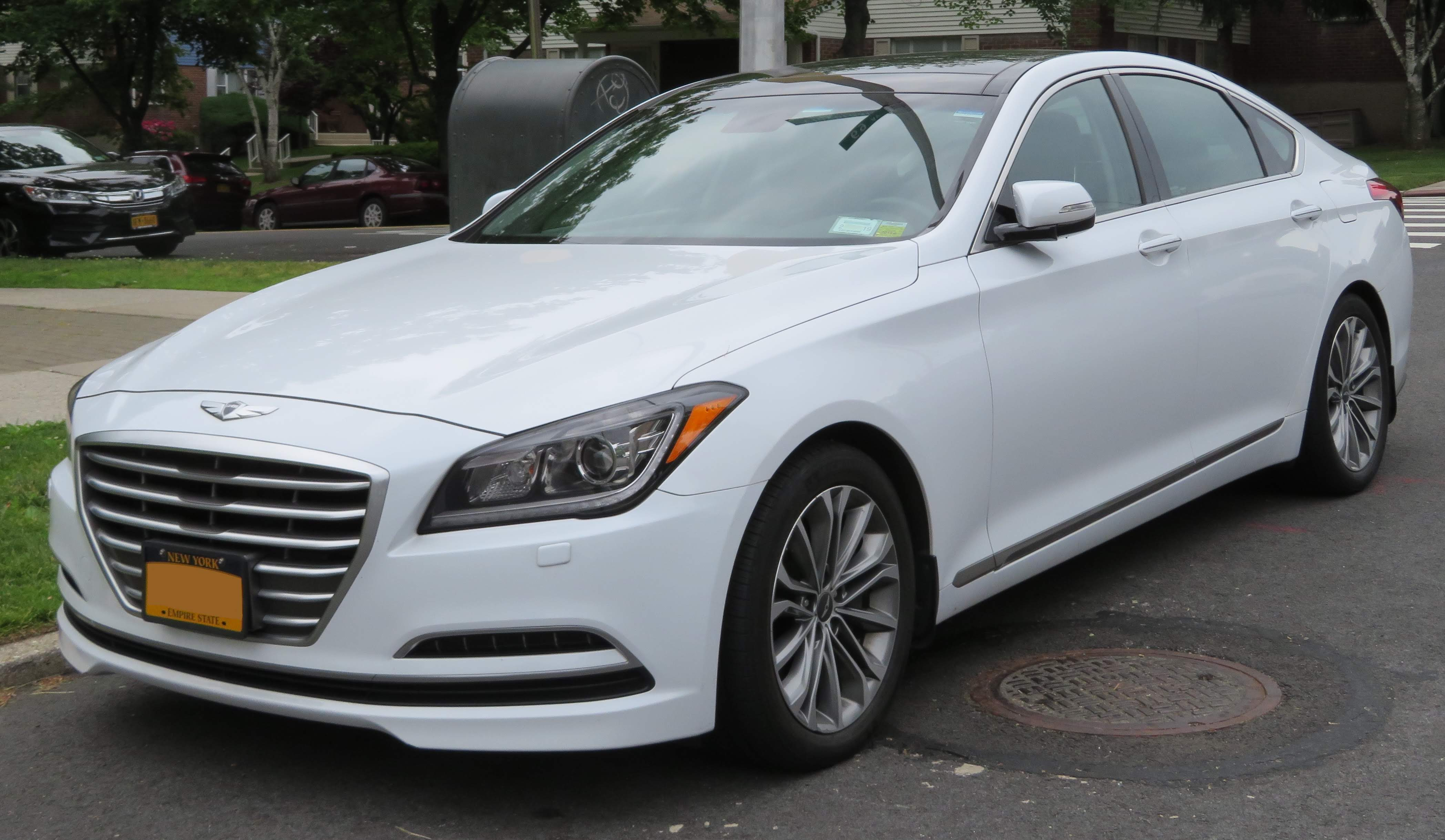
- 2015 Hyundai Genesis (DH)

Overview
- Manufacturer: Hyundai
- Production: 2008–2016 (as Hyundai Genesis); 2016–2020 (as Genesis G80)

Body and chassis
- Class: Executive car (E)
- Body style: 4-door sedan
- Layout: Front-engine, rear-wheel-drive Front-engine, four-wheel-drive

Chronology
- Successor: Genesis G80

The Hyundai Genesis (Korean: 현대 제네시스) is an executive car manufactured and marketed by Hyundai Motor Company over two generations from 2008 until 2016, before it was renamed the Genesis G80. It is a five-passenger, four-door, rear- or all-wheel-drive sedan.

Introduced in concept form at the 2007 New York International Auto Show, and internally designated as the BH model, the Genesis was expected to cost $533 million to develop. Hyundai began marketing the first generation Genesis worldwide (except in Europe) in 2008 as a "premium sports sedan". The second generation Genesis (model DH) debuted in Seoul, Korea in November 2013 followed by the 2014 North American International Auto Show and Toronto Auto Show.

On 4 November 2015, Hyundai announced that the name Genesis and Hyundai's second generation luxury model would move to a new and separate luxury division, Genesis Motor. The Genesis — as a Hyundai model — was replaced in actuality in 2017 when the second generation Hyundai Genesis was renamed the G80. The move followed the model's success in the luxury market, paired with consumer acceptance of the Genesis nameplate.

== Development and design ==
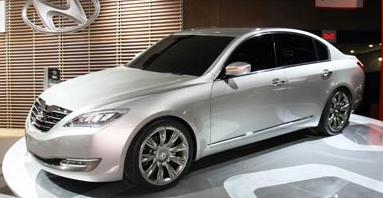
Hyundai Genesis Concept

Introduced in March 2007 as the "Concept Genesis", the sedan was designed by Hyundai as a "progressive interpretation of the modern rear-wheel drive sports sedan". Hyundai conceived the idea for the Genesis in 2003. The body design took three years and the total cost of the program was $500 million over a development period of 23 months. Reliability testing ran for 800,000 miles.

Hyundai reportedly benchmarked the BMW 5 Series (E60) sedan during the Genesis' development; the company's press release indicates the Genesis body in white exceeds the BMW in torsional rigidity by 14%. The production Genesis sedan received a five-star crash rating in every category from the National Highway Traffic Safety Administration. Hyundai markets the Genesis as offering "the performance of a BMW 5-Series and the interior packaging of a 7-Series at the price of a 3-Series".

Reviewing the Genesis 4.6 at its US introduction, automotive journalist Dan Neil called the absence of brand emblems at the front of the Genesis "a move that subverts the grammar of luxury".

== First generation (BH; 2008) ==
First generation
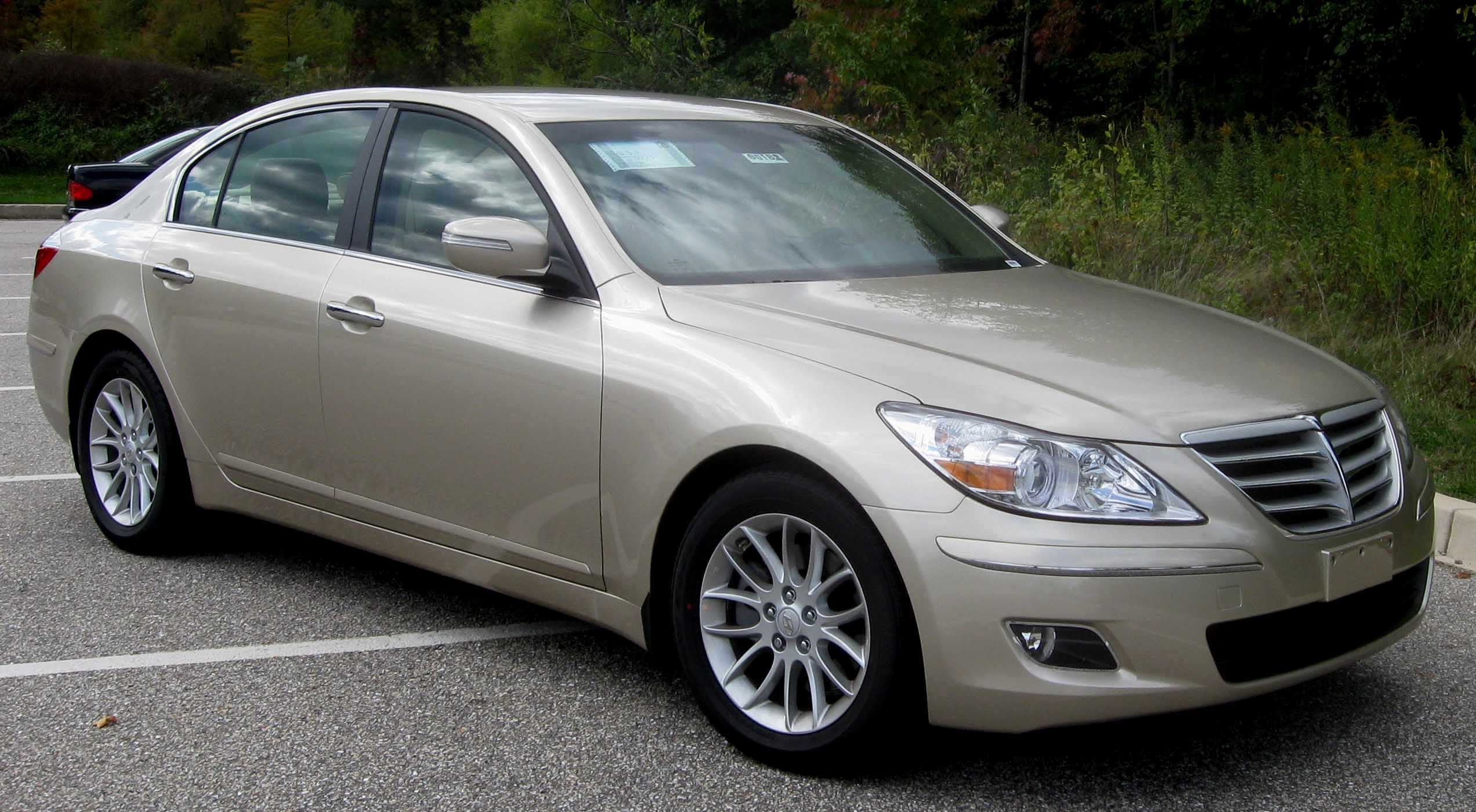
- 2009 Hyundai Genesis (US)

Overview
- Model code: BH
- Also called: Hyundai Rohens (China)
- Production: 2008–2013
- Model years: 2009–2014
- Assembly: South Korea: Ulsan
- Designer: John Krsteski

Body and chassis
- Layout: Front-engine, rear-wheel-drive
- Platform: Hyundai BH
- Related: Hyundai Genesis Coupe; Hyundai Equus/Centennial (VI); Kia K9/K900/Quoris (KH)

Powertrain
- Engine: Petrol: 3.3 L Lambda II MPi V6; 3.3 L Lambda II GDi V6; 3.8 L Lambda II MPi V6; 3.8 L Lambda II GDi V6; 4.6 L Tau MPi V8; 5.0 L Tau GDi V8
- Transmission: 6-speed Aisin B-600 automatic 6-speed ZF 6HP 26 automatic 8-speed A8LR1/A8TR1 automatic

Dimensions
- Wheelbase: 2,935 mm (115.6 in)
- Length: 4,975 mm (195.9 in) (2009–2011); 4,985 mm (196.3 in) (2012–2014)
- Width: 1,890 mm (74.4 in)
- Height: 1,480 mm (58.3 in) (2009–2011); 1,475 mm (58.1 in) (2012–2014)
- Curb weight: 1,700–1,870 kg (3,748–4,123 lb)

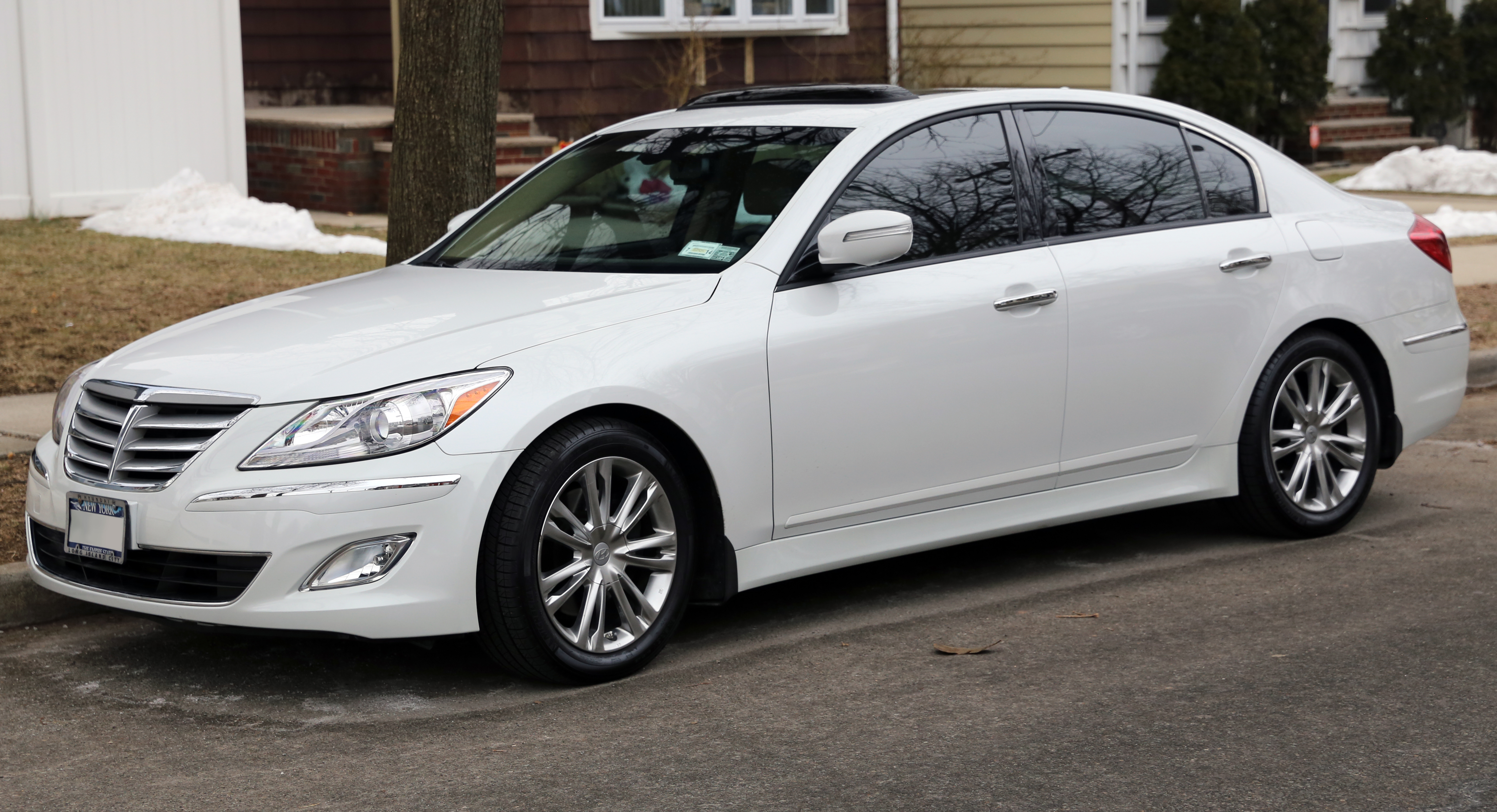

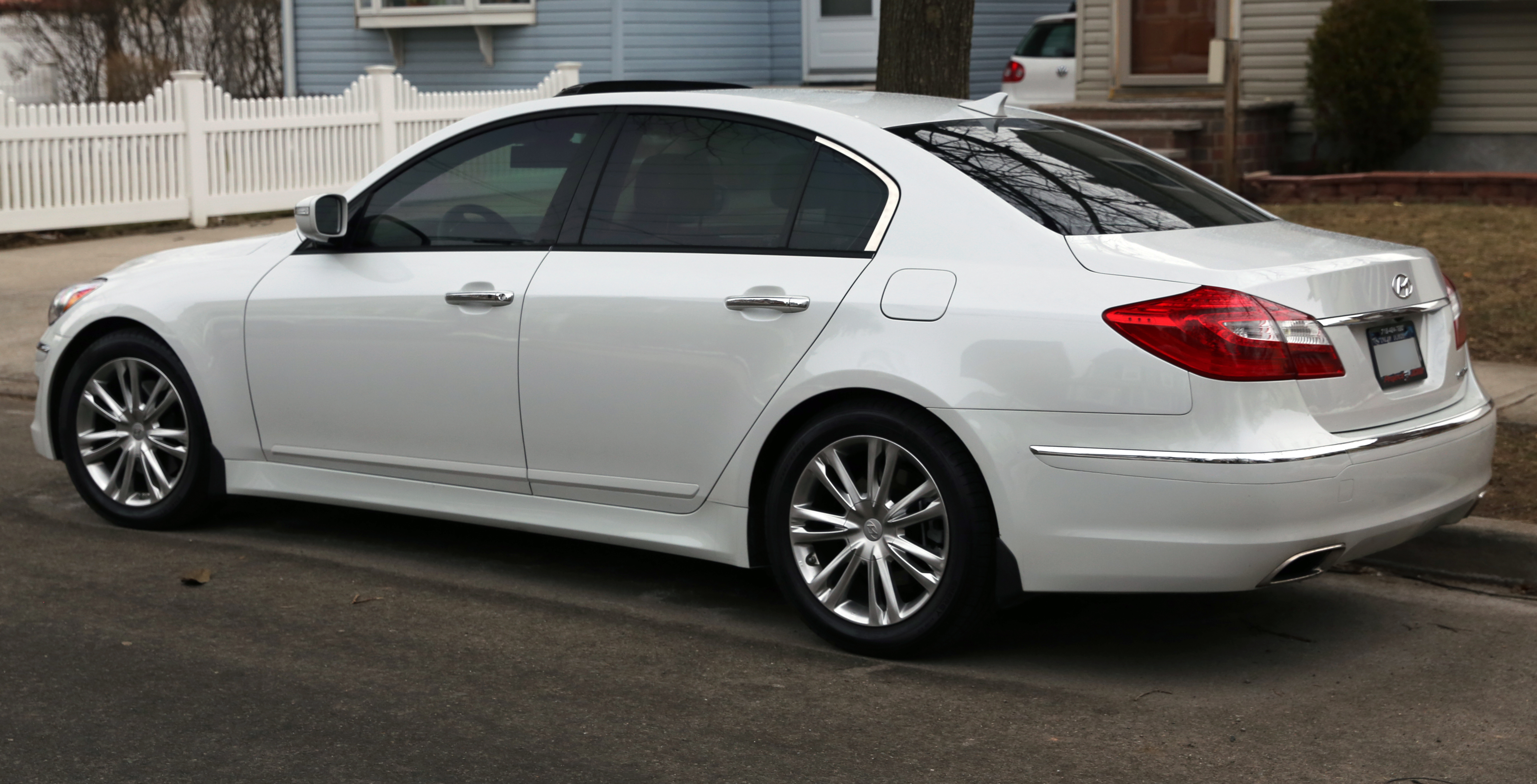
2012 facelift

The Genesis was announced in Seoul and later unveiled at the 2008 North American International Auto Show. The first generation was marketed worldwide except in the European market.

Equipment included a speed-sensitive rack-and-pinion steering, four-wheel disc brakes, multi-link front and 5-link rear suspension; and three engine choices, depending on market: A V8 with weight distribution of 53% front / 47% rear and two V6 engines with 52% front / 48% rear weight distribution.

At introduction in the US in summer 2008, standard features included cruise control, automatic headlights, dual-zone automatic air conditioning, leather seat-upholstery and steering wheel, heated front seats with power adjustments, power windows, door locks, and mirrors, remote keyless entry and starting, and a seven-speaker audio system with XM satellite radio.

Two optional Lexicon-branded audio systems offer 7.1 channels and 14 or 17 speakers.

=== Drivetrains ===
The Tau V8 is Hyundai's first domestic V8 engine. For the 2008–09 model years, the 4.6 L engine produced 375 hp (280 kW) at 6,500 rpm and 333 lb⋅ft (451 N⋅m) at 3,500 rpm. Introduced as a midyear change for the 2010 model, the 4.6 L V8 now produces 385 hp (287 kW) at 6,500 rpm, with no change in the torque output: 333 lb⋅ft (451 N⋅m) at 3,500 rpm. These figures are achieved using premium fuel. The V8 can also run on regular unleaded, in which case the 2010–11 model produces 378 hp (282 kW) and 324 lb-ft. For the V8 model, Hyundai has reported 0–60 mph (97 km/h) times of less than 6 seconds. Car and Driver reports a 0–60 mph time of 5.3 seconds while Motor Trend reports a 0–60 mph time of 5.5 seconds in their October 2008 issue.

The Lambda 3.8 L V6 is available in Korean and North American models. In Korean spec, the engine produces 306 hp (228 kW). In US spec this engine produces 290 hp (216 kW) at 6,200 rpm (up to 333 hp in GDi spec) and 264 lb⋅ft (358 N⋅m) at 4,500 rpm. Motor Trend reports a 0–60 mph time of 5.9 seconds.

The Lambda 3.3 L V6 is available in some markets, producing 264 hp (197 kW).

In North America, the 2009-2011 V8-powered Genesis features a standard ZF 6HP26 6-speed automatic transmission from ZF Friedrichshafen (same as the unit found in the 2004-2010 BMW 5 Series), with the V6 models receiving an Aisin B600 6-speed automatic. The recommended gasoline for the V8 is premium for maximum fuel economy and horsepower, but also runs on regular. The V6 engine is designed for regular grade gasoline.

Petrol engines
Model	Years	Type/code	Power	Torque	0–100 km/h 0-62 mph (Official)	Top Speed
Lambda II 3.3 MPi	2008–2013	3,342 cc (203.9 cu in) G6DB	262 PS (193 kW; 258 hp) @ 6,200 rpm	32.2 kg⋅m (316 N⋅m; 233 lbf⋅ft) @ 4,500 rpm	7.6s	240 km/h (149 mph)
Lambda II 3.3 GDi	2011–2013	3,342 cc (203.9 cu in) G6DH	300 PS (221 kW; 296 hp) @ 6,400 rpm	35.5 kg⋅m (348 N⋅m; 257 lbf⋅ft) @ 5,200 rpm		
Lambda II 3.8 MPi	2008–2013	3,778 cc (230.5 cu in) G6DA	290 PS (213 kW; 286 hp) @ 6,200 rpm	36.5 kg⋅m (358 N⋅m; 264 lbf⋅ft) @ 4,500 rpm	6.9s	240 km/h (149 mph)
Lambda II 3.8 GDi	2011–2013	3,778 cc (230.5 cu in) G6DJ	334–338 PS (246–249 kW; 329–333 hp) @ 6,400 rpm	40.3 kg⋅m (395 N⋅m; 291 lbf⋅ft) @ 5,100 rpm	6.2s	240 km/h (149 mph)
Tau 4.6 MPi	2008–2010	4,627 cc (282.4 cu in) G8BA	366 PS (269 kW; 361 hp) @ 6,500 rpm 380 PS (279 kW; 375 hp) @ 6,500 rpm	44.8 kg⋅m (439 N⋅m; 324 lbf⋅ft) @ 3,500 rpm 46.0 kg⋅m (451 N⋅m; 333 lbf⋅ft) @ 3,500 rpm	6.0s	240 km/h (149 mph)
Tau 4.6 MPi	2010–2013	4,627 cc (282.4 cu in) G8BA	385–390 PS (283–287 kW; 380–385 hp) @ 6,500 rpm	44.8 kg⋅m (439 N⋅m; 324 lbf⋅ft) @ 3,500 rpm 46.0 kg⋅m (451 N⋅m; 333 lbf⋅ft) @ 3,500 rpm		
Tau 5.0 GDi	2011–2013	5,038 cc (307.4 cu in) G8BE	430–435 PS (316–320 kW; 424–429 hp) @ 6,400 rpm	52.0 kg⋅m (510 N⋅m; 376 lbf⋅ft) @ 5,000 rpm		

South Korean models include choice of Lambda 3.3 GDi, Lambda 3.8 GDi engines.

US models include choice of 3.8 Lambda GDi, Tau 4.6 MPi (390PS), 5.0 Tau GDi engines.

Canadian models include choice of 3.8 Lambda GDi, 5.0 Tau GDi (R-Spec only) engines.

=== Safety ===
Standard safety features include dual front airbags, front and rear side airbags, side-curtain airbags, ABS, brake assist, EBD, traction control, and electronic stability control.

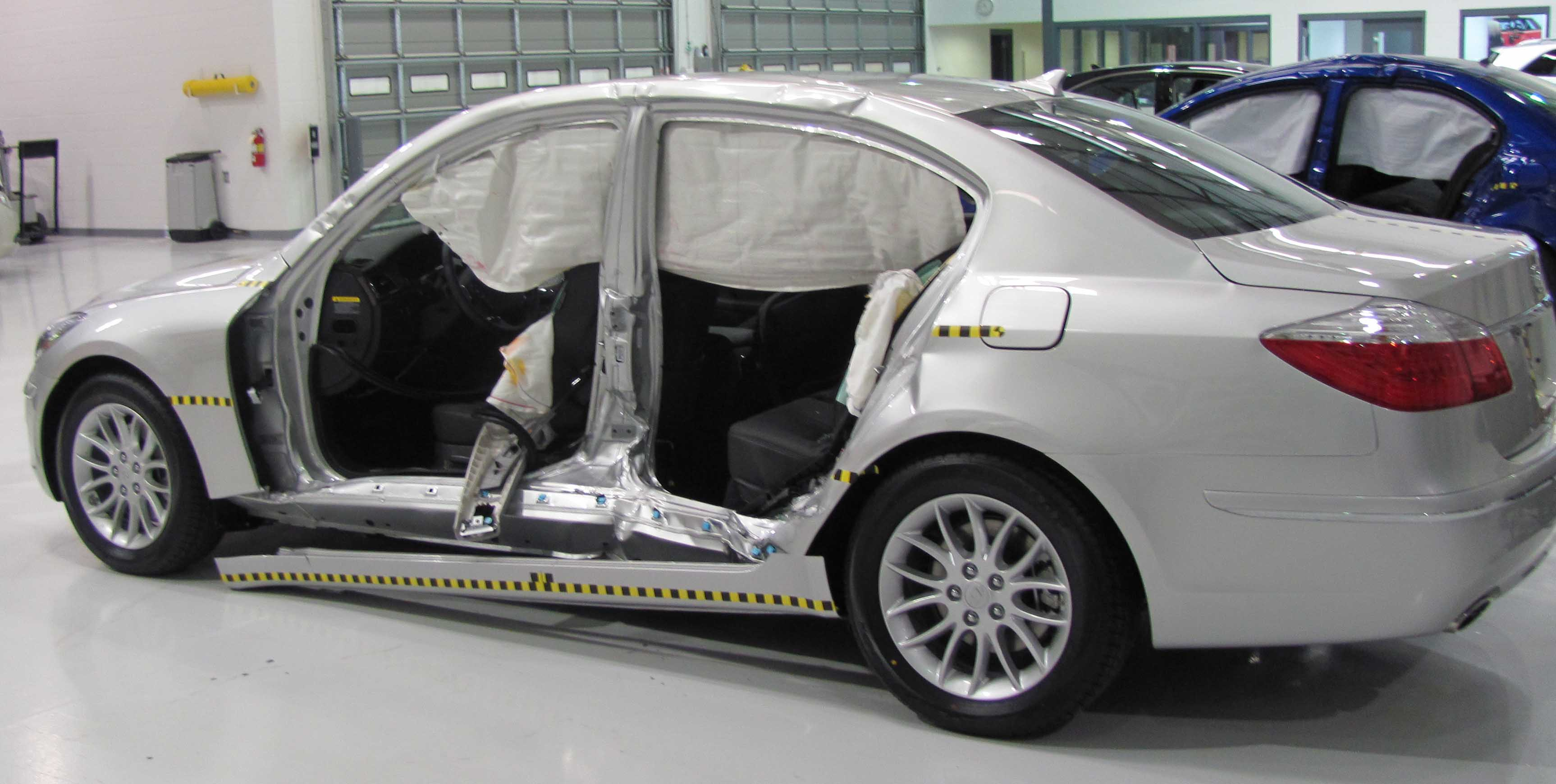
A 2010 Genesis crash-tested by the Insurance Institute for Highway Safety

- U.S. National Highway Traffic Safety Administration 2009 Genesis:

Frontal Driver:
Frontal Passenger:
Side Driver:
Side Rear Passenger:
Rollover:

- "2009–2010 Top Safety Pick" Award by the US Insurance Institute for Highway Safety models mfg after Nov. 2008

=== Marketing ===
As part of the US product launch, Hyundai Motor America and Carbonfund.org unveiled the Genesis Forest Project at the 2008 Los Angeles Auto Show, to offset the entire first year of emissions for all 2009 Hyundai Genesis sedans sold in the United States. The Genesis Forest Project was retroactively applied to all 2009 Genesis sedan sales, which began in June, and continue through the end of the year.

Sold as Hyundai Rohens in China, the unveiling was at the Beijing International Automotive Exhibition, 2008. Sales began in August 2008.

=== 2010 model year updates ===
The Premium Navigation Package replaces the previous Premium Plus Package which most notably upgraded to 18-inch alloy wheels, still a part of this new package.

For 2010 the 4.6-liter Genesis was available in only one trim, with all packages made standard, including the Technology package. The car also received a slightly uprated engine as a midyear change, with the 4.6-litre V8 producing 385 hp (287 kW) at 6500 rpm and an identical 333 lb⋅ft (451 N⋅m) of torque at 3500 rpm.

==== 5.0 R-Spec (2011–2014) ====
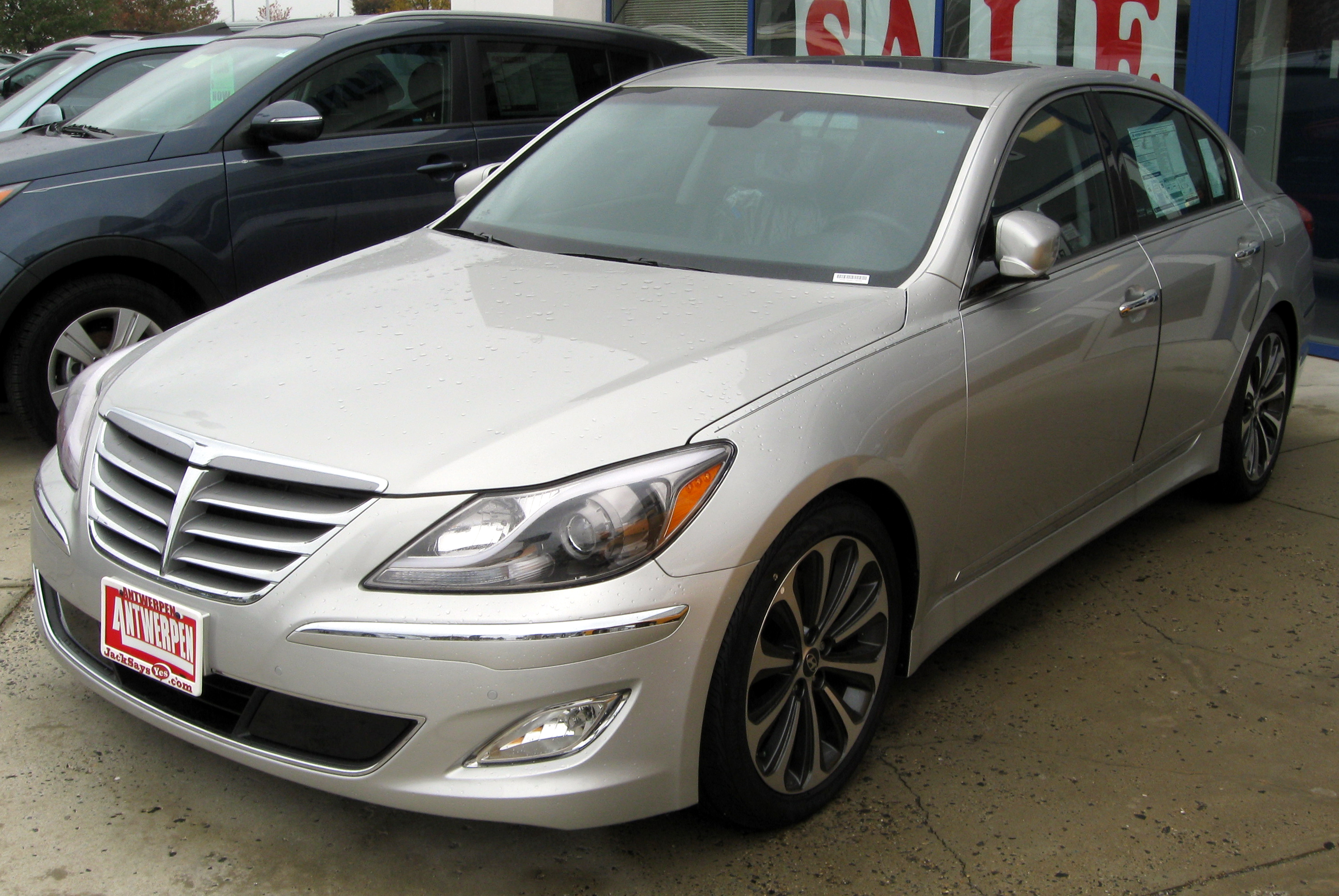
2012 Hyundai Genesis R-Spec (US)

This model includes the new Tau 5.0 GDi engine, choice of three exterior colors and black interior. Genesis 5.0 R-Spec includes Genesis 4.6 equipment, plus 19-inch Premium Machined Finish alloy wheels with P235/45R19 tires, Unique headlamps w/dark chrome inserts, Sport-tuned suspension calibration, Unique R-Spec embroidered floor mats, R-Spec rear deck lid badging, deleted woodgrain from leather steering wheel. The vehicle was unveiled in Seoul.

All models include 8-speed automatic transmission with SHIFTRONIC manual mode.

=== 2011 model year update ===
For the 2011 model year, the Tau V8 engine offered 385 horsepower. The 4.6 now featured as standard equipment, features from the previous Tech Package, including the Lexicon 7.1 surround-sound audio system with 17 speakers, the navigation system with 8-inch screen, smart cruise control, electronic parking brake, cooled driver seat, adaptive front lighting system with HID headlights, and parking assistance system featuring front and rear sensors and rearview camera.

=== 2012 model year update ===
For the 2012 model year, engine choices included the 3.8 Lambda GDi, 4.6 Tau MPi (390PS), 5.0 Tau GDi for R-Spec. The transmission was changed to 8-speed automatic with SHIFTRONIC. Changes to US models included revised shock and spring rates and rear stabilizer; 5.0-liter direct-injected Tau V8 engine now exclusive to 5.0 R-Spec model; standard 5.0-liter model no longer available; 4.6-liter V8 available; 3.8-liter V6 available in three equipment configurations; revised optional eight-inch touchscreen display with navigation and an enhanced multi-media controller and Driver Information System (DIS); Hyundai Blue Link telematics available with Ultimate Navigation package.

=== 2014 model year update ===
The last changes to US models before the new generation was introduced included greater connectivity options via the Hyundai Blue Link interface, some revised controls, a new exterior body colour (Santiago Silver instead of Platinum Metallic), 18-inch wheels as standard on the base model, and Hyundai's Assurance Connected Care telematics services are standard for three years on all 2014 Genesis sedans equipped with Blue Link.

== Second generation (DH; 2013) ==
Second generation
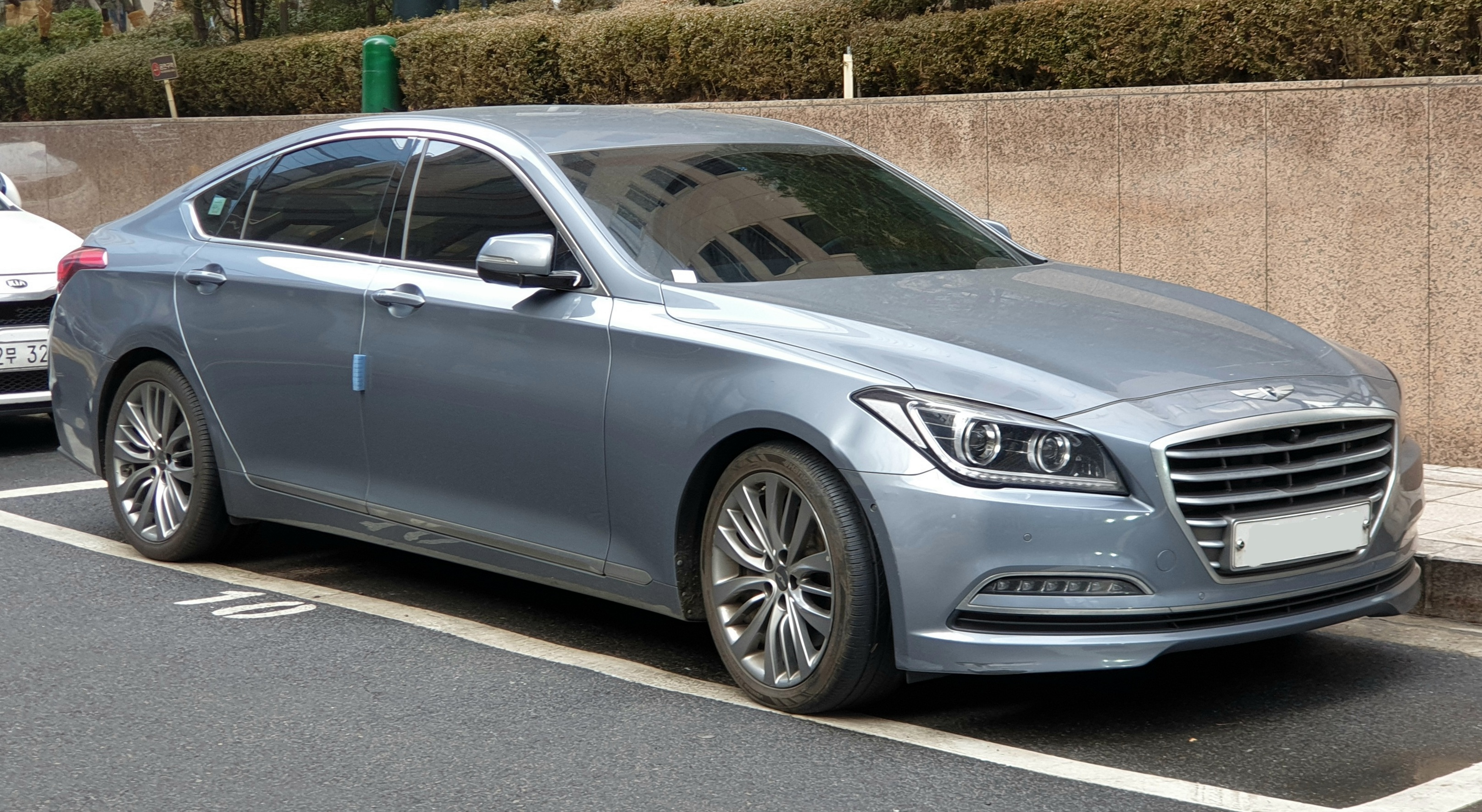

Overview
- Model code: DH
- Also called: Genesis G80 (facelift; 2016–2020)
- Production: November 2013–2016 (as Hyundai Genesis); 2016–March 30, 2020 (as Genesis G80)
- Model years: 2015–2016; 2017–2020 (as Genesis G80)
- Assembly: South Korea: Ulsan; Russia: Kaliningrad (Avtotor: 2016–2017)
- Designer: Casey Hyun; Jun Ho Kim (2011); Peter Schreyer

Body and chassis
- Layout: Front-engine, rear-wheel-drive Front-engine, four-wheel-drive
- Platform: Hyundai M2 Platform
- Related: Genesis G90/EQ900 (HI); Kia K9/K900/Quoris (RJ)

Powertrain
- Engine: Petrol: 3.0 L Lambda II GDi V6; 3.3 L Lambda II GDi V6; 3.8 L Lambda II GDi V6; 5.0 L Tau GDi V8
- Transmission: 8-speed A8LR1/A8TR1 automatic

Dimensions
- Wheelbase: 3,010 mm (118.5 in)
- Length: 4,990 mm (196.5 in)
- Width: 1,890 mm (74.4 in)
- Height: 1,480 mm (58.3 in)
- Curb weight: 1,880–2,060 kg (4,145–4,542 lb)

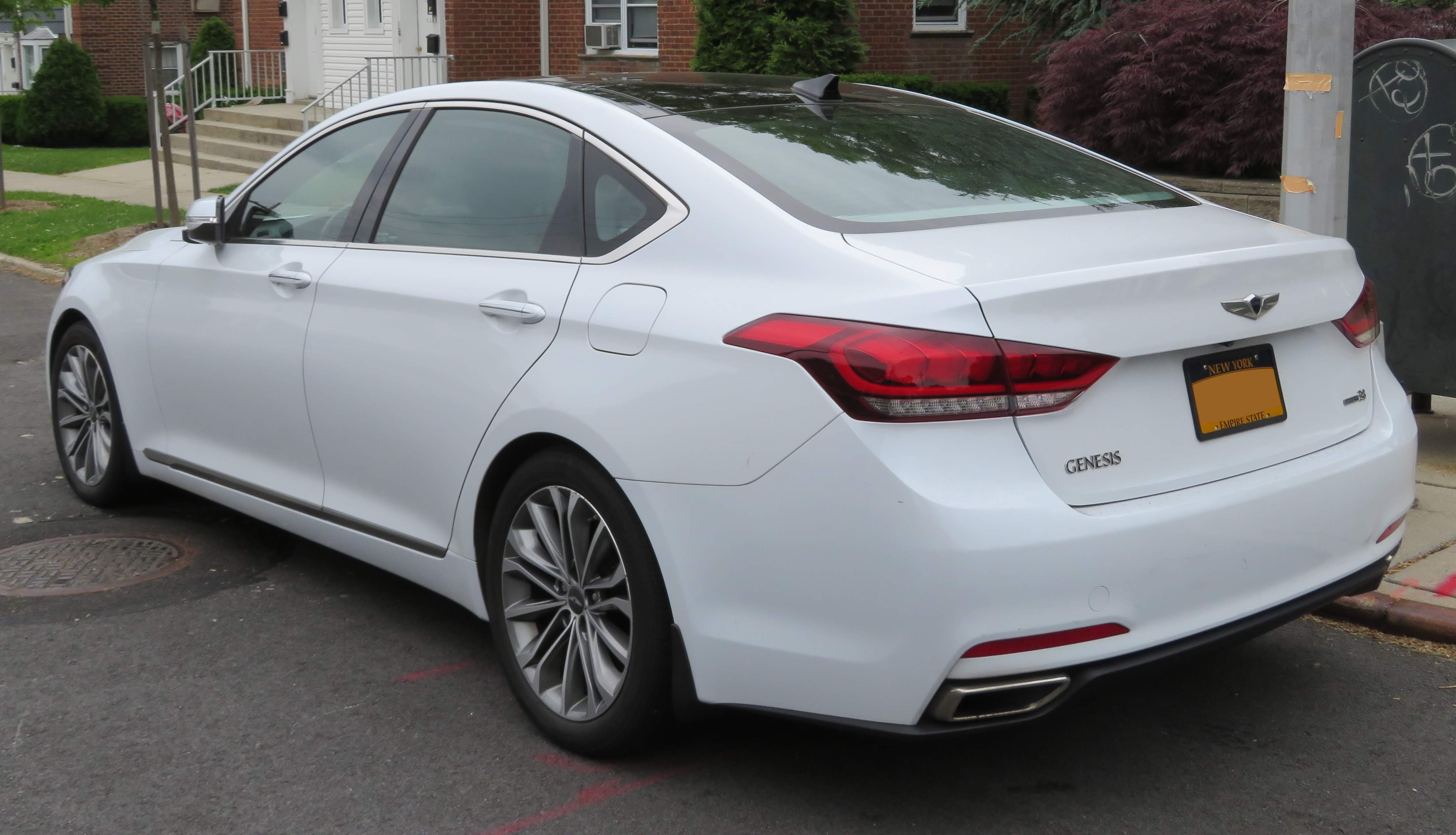
Rear view

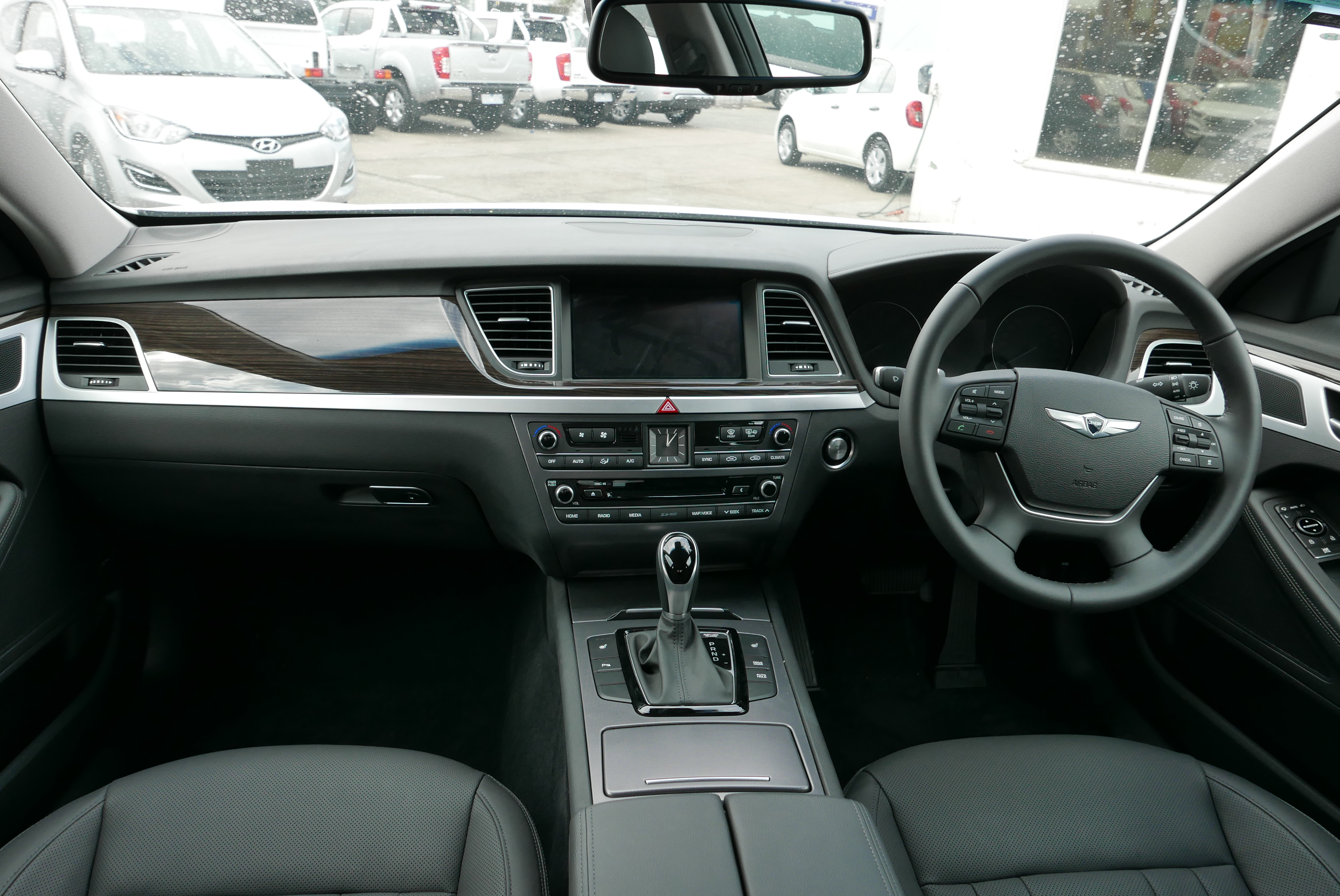
Interior

The second generation Genesis was previewed by the "Hyundai HCD-14 Genesis" concept at NAIAS 2013. The vehicle was unveiled in Seoul, Korea, followed by the 2014 North American International Auto Show, then the 2014 Toronto Auto Show.

Early models include a choice of four engines (Lambda 3.0 GDi, Lambda 3.3 GDi, Lambda 3.8 GDi, Tau 5.0 GDi), rear or all-wheel-drive. All models include eight-speed automatic transmission with manual shift mode and a five star safety rating.

=== Safety ===
2016 Hyundai Genesis 3.8L AWD NHTSA
Overall:	5/5 stars
Frontal driver:	5/5 stars
Frontal passenger:	5/5 stars
Side driver:	4/5 stars
Side passenger:	5/5 stars
Side pole driver:	4/5 stars
Rollover AWD:	9.50%

IIHS:
Category	Rating
Moderate overlap frontal offset	Good
Side impact	Good
Roof strength	Good^{1}

^{1} strength-to-weight ratio: 4.95

ANCAP test results* Hyundai Genesis (2014)
Test	Score
Overall	5 /5 stars
Frontal offset	15.88/16
Side impact	16/16
Pole	2/2
Seat belt reminders	3/3
Whiplash protection	Good
Pedestrian protection	Adequate
Electronic stability control	Standard

=== Engines ===
Petrol engines
Model	Years	Type/code	Power@rpm	Torque@rpm	0–100 km/h (0-62 mph) (Official)
3.0 Lambda II GDi	2013–2016	2,999 cc (183.0 cu in) G6DG	257 PS (189 kW; 253 hp) @ 6000 rpm	31.0 kg⋅m (304 N⋅m; 224 lbf⋅ft) @ 5000 rpm	8.6s (RWD)
3.3 Lambda II GDi	2013–2016	3,342 cc (203.9 cu in) G6DH	282 PS (207 kW; 278 hp) @ 6000 rpm	35.4 kg⋅m (347 N⋅m; 256 lbf⋅ft) @ 5000 rpm	7.2s (RWD)
3.8 Lambda II GDi	2013–2016	3,778 cc (230.5 cu in) G6DJ	315 PS (232 kW; 311 hp) @ 6000 rpm	40.5 kg⋅m (397 N⋅m; 293 lbf⋅ft) @ 5000 rpm	6.5s (RWD); 6.8s (AWD)
5.0 Tau GDi	2013–2016	5,038 cc (307.4 cu in) G8BE	425 PS (313 kW; 419 hp) @ 6000 rpm	53.0 kg⋅m (520 N⋅m; 383 lbf⋅ft) @ 5000 rpm	5.4s (RWD)

== Marketing ==
A full production version went on sale in South Korea on 8 January 2008 in Hyundai's home market, South Korea. Notably, the Korean market Genesis does not carry a Hyundai badge, only the 'Genesis' emblem.

Hyundai has been criticised by Korean consumers over the price discrepancy between the US and Korean markets. Yonhap reports the Genesis costs "₩58.3 million (US$57,000) in Korea, whereas in the U.S. it sells for $32,000." This has led to dumping allegations and a growing market in reimported Genesises by gray market dealers. Korean regulators are currently investigating whether Hyundai has abused its 75% domestic market share. However, Hyundai cars in South Korea have more available options and that may be the reason for the mark-ups.

Marketed as the Hyundai Genesis in the US and Canada, the vehicle is the largest, most powerful car that Hyundai has ever marketed there before the launch of the Equus.

The Genesis sedan went on sale in the US in August 2008. In its first five months of sales, the Genesis under-performed in the competitive US market selling only 6,167 units. According to Hyundai, Genesis saw sales of just 1,297 units in its first full sales month and the company expected to move around 8000 units from the US showrooms by the end of 2008. In 2009, the Genesis sold 21,889 units in the U.S. (sedan and coupe combined).

There had been internal discussions within Hyundai about creating a separate brand to feature the Genesis sedan as well as the soon to come Equus sedan in North America, but due to prohibitive costs and potential delays the Genesis and Equus remained tagged with the Hyundai brand until 2016. In late 2016, The Genesis brand became separate from Hyundai in the United States.

The Genesis was not marketed at first in Europe because of Lexus's failure to thrive in Europe. According to a September 2007 article in Tradingmarkets.com, "in the eyes of European purchasers of luxury vehicles, Hyundai sedans have been perceived as having a poor image and unreliable durability compared with its rivals." "The planned launch of Genesis comes at a time when Hyundai is striving to shake off its poor-brand image, known for generous warranties and low prices."

The latest Genesis will be sold in Europe, priced at about €65,000 in Germany.

The Genesis is sold in Latin America in Costa Rica, Dominican Republic, Colombia, Chile and Peru, offering versions with engines of 3.3 and 3.8 liters, and in Brazil only with the 3.8 liters engine.

Australia was the first country in the Oceania region to get the Genesis sedan, arriving in November 2014.

== Coupe ==
A rear wheel drive sports car from Hyundai, dubbed Hyundai Genesis Coupe and sharing the Genesis Sedan's platform and name, was unveiled at the 2008 New York International Auto Show.

== Awards ==
The Genesis sedan has received numerous awards and recognitions. Among them:

- Named one of the top five luxury sedans in 2008 by the National Automobile Dealers Association
- USA Today stated Hyundai proves it's a master of luxury 2008
- Named as Consumer Reports 'Top-Rated Upscale Sedan' (2009)
- Ranked No. 1 midsize premium car by JD Power 2009 APEAL study (beating out the BMW 5 Series, Jaguar XF)
- Given 9.5 out of 10 points in 2009 by Edmunds.com, which stated it features a cabin comparable to a top-of-the-line Lexus, but pointed to lack of "brand cachet" as its main drawback
- According to Edmunds.com in 2009: "With badges removed, the Genesis could easily pass as a Lexus or Mercedes-Benz, although we doubt many brand-conscious people would give a Hyundai a second glance."
- Named the 2009 North American Car of the Year
- Ranked tops in JD Power's Vehicle Launch Index (VLI)
- Automotive, Performance, Execution awards by J.D. Power
- Car of the Year by Autotropolis.com
- Named AutoPacific ideal vehicle 2009 award winner
- Recognized as a best new model for 2009 by Kiplinger's Personal Finance
- Won top Safety Award by the U.S. Insurance Institute for Highway Safety (IIHS)
- Cars.com New Car of the Year 2009
- Luxury and Value on the 2009 Best New Car List by About.com
- Car of the Year at the 2009 Urban Wheel Awards by Wheels Media
- Named a "Top 5 Luxury Car for 2009" & "Car of the Month (April)" & "Best Car Buy" by the U.S. National Automobile Dealers Association (NADAguides.com)
- 2009 "Best Bet" award from The Car Book
- Won MyRide/Autobytel 2009 Editors' Choice award
- Named a Consumer Guide recommended buy 2009
- Consumers Digest (luxury segment) 2009 best buy
- America's Top 40 New Cars by Motor Trend 2009
- Assessed as having the highest residual value by the 2009 Automotive Lease Guide
- According to the editor-in-chief blog of Motor Trend, "Hyundai Genesis: A Car Detroit Can Now Only Dream of Building?", The Genesis came close to winning the 2009 Motor Trend Car of the Year title.
- Hyundai Genesis sedan awarded as segment leader for the 2009 near-luxury car class of vehicles by Strategic Vision
- AutoPacific's 2009 consumer Vehicle Satisfaction survey of Hyundai owners placed the Genesis at the top of its class in Awards (VSA) research.
- Named "Best Luxury Sedan" in MotorWeek's 2009 Driver's Choice Awards.
- Named 2009 North American Car of the Year, the first for Hyundai.
- Won 2009 Canadian Car of the Year after winning its category of Best New Luxury Car under $50,000.
- Won 2009 Car of the Year award by China's Autoworld magazine.
- Hyundai's V8 Tau engine received the 2009 Ward's 10 Best Engines award.
- Named "Best Deal for the Boss" in the Cars.com 2010 annual Best Lifestyle Vehicle Awards
