= Hyundai Tau engine =

τ-engine^{Tau engine}

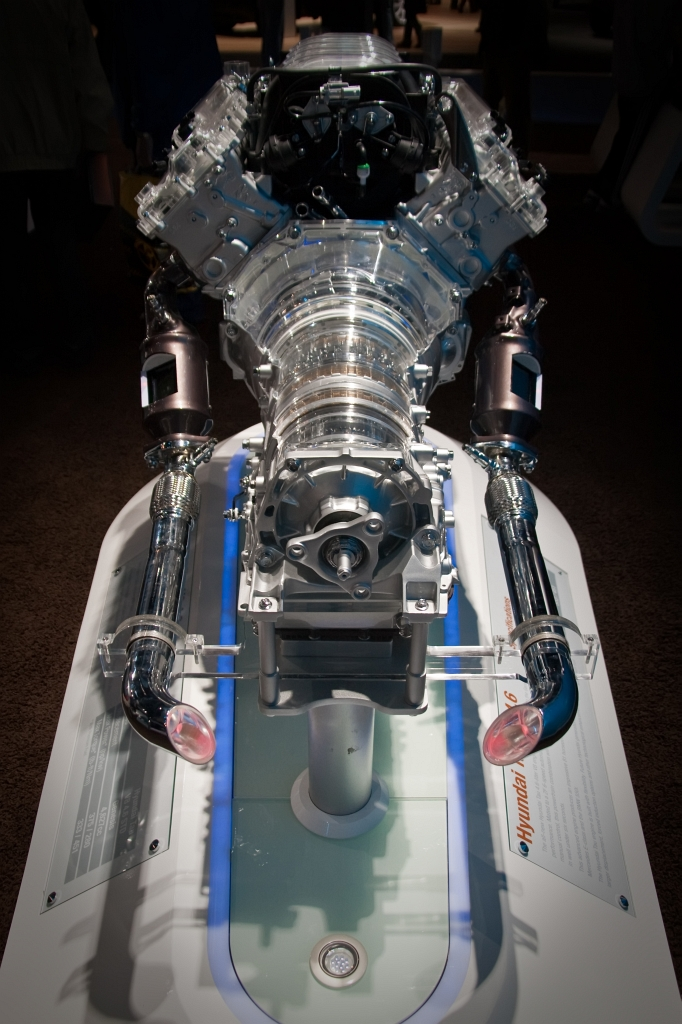

Overview
- Manufacturer: Hyundai Motor Company
- Production: 2008–2021

Layout
- Configuration: 90° V8
- Displacement: 4.6 L (4,627 cc); 5.0 L (5,038 cc)
- Cylinder bore: 92 mm (3.62 in); 96 mm (3.78 in)
- Piston stroke: 87 mm (3.43 in)
- Cylinder block material: High pressure die cast aluminum
- Cylinder head material: Aluminum
- Valvetrain: DOHC 4 valves x cyl. with D-CVVT
- Compression ratio: 10.4:1, 11.5:1, 11.8:1

Combustion
- Fuel system: Multi-port fuel injection Direct injection
- Fuel type: Gasoline
- Cooling system: Water-cooled

Output
- Power output: 366–435 PS (269–320 kW; 361–429 hp)
- Torque output: 44.8–53 kg⋅m (439–520 N⋅m; 324–383 lbf⋅ft)

Chronology
- Predecessor: Omega

The Tau τ is a family of gasoline V8 engines produced by the Hyundai Motor Company. It replaced the Omega engine line.

== Tau MPi ==
Petrol engines
Model	Engine code	Power at rpm	Torque at rpm	Compression ratio
4.6 Tau MPi (366PS)	G8BA	366 PS (269 kW; 361 hp) at 6500	44.8 kg⋅m (439 N⋅m; 324 lbf⋅ft) at 3500	10.4:1
4.6 Tau MPi (390PS)	G8BA	383 PS (282 kW; 378 hp) at 6500 (Regular); 390 PS (287 kW; 385 hp) at 6500 (Premium)	44.8 kg⋅m (439 N⋅m; 324 lbf⋅ft) at 3500 (Regular); 46 kg⋅m (451 N⋅m; 333 lbf⋅ft) at 3500 (Premium)	10.4:1
5.0 Tau MPi	G8BB	Premium fuel: 400 PS (294 kW; 395 hp) at 6400	51 kg⋅m (500 N⋅m; 369 lbf⋅ft) at 3500	10.4:1

=== Specifications ===
4.6 Tau MPi for the Genesis' 4.6L Tau V8 engine:

- Displacement (bore x stroke): 4.6 L (4,627 cc) (92 mm × 87 mm (3.62 in × 3.43 in))
- Block material: High pressure die casting aluminum block
- Cylinder head material: Aluminum
- Valvetrain: Dual Over Head Cam (DOHC)
- Valve timing: Continuous variable valve timing
- Variable induction system
- Fuel delivery: Multi-port fuel injection
- Recommended fuel: Premium Unleaded, though it can run safely on regular gasoline with reduced performance

=== Application ===
==== 4.6 Tau MPi ====
- 2008–2009 Kia Mohave/Borrego
- 2008–2012 Hyundai Genesis
- 2009–2011 Hyundai Equus

Hyundai Motor Company has also shown a supercharged version of the 4.6 Tau MPi engine at 2008 SEMA show, and later 2009 Chicago Auto Show. This engine was equipped with a supercharger and cylinder deactivation technology to produce an estimated 460 hp (343 kW) while returning better fuel economy.

== Tau GDi ==
=== First version (2012–2014) ===
The Tau GDi uses gasoline direct injection.

Petrol engines
Model	Engine code	Power at rpm	Torque at rpm	Compression ratio
5.0 Tau GDi	G8BE	430 PS (316 kW; 424 hp) at 6400 (Regular); 435 PS (320 kW; 429 hp) at 6400 (Premium)	52 kg⋅m (510 N⋅m; 376 lbf⋅ft) at 5000	11.5:1

==== Specifications ====
5.0 Tau GDi for Equus' 5.0L Tau V8 engine:

- Horsepower: 429 hp (320 kW)
- Torque: 52 kg⋅m (510 N⋅m; 376 lbf⋅ft)
- Displacement (bore x stroke): 5.0 L (5,038 cc) (96 mm × 87 mm (3.78 in × 3.43 in))
- Compression ratio: 11.5:1
- Block material: High pressure die casting aluminum block
- Cylinder head material: Aluminum
- Valvetrain: Dual Over Head Cam (DOHC)
- Valve timing: Dual-Continuous variable valve timing(D-CVVT)
- Variable induction system
- Fuel delivery: Gasoline direct injection / Electronic fuel injection
- Recommended fuel: Premium Unleaded, though it can run safely on regular gasoline with reduced performance

=== Second version (2015–2021) ===
Updates to the 2015 Genesis 5.0 Tau V8 included:

- Bump in compression ratio from 11.5:1 to 11.8:1
- Optimized intake runner length
- Enhanced timing chain for reduced friction and NVH
- Low-torque exhaust manifold
- Upgraded multiple-injection mapping
- Dual Continuously Variable Valve Timing (D-CVVT), a tuned variable induction system, and low-friction coatings on piston skirts
- Improved Low-end response along with better efficiency and NVH

Model	Engine code	Power at rpm	Torque at rpm	Compression ratio
5.0 Tau GDi	G8BE	413 PS (304 kW; 407 hp) at 6000 (Regular); 425 PS (313 kW; 419 hp) at 6000 (Premium)	51.4 kg⋅m (504 N⋅m; 372 lbf⋅ft) at 5000 (Regular); 53 kg⋅m (520 N⋅m; 383 lbf⋅ft) at 5000 (Premium)	11.8:1

=== Application ===
- 2016–2020 Genesis G80 (DH)
- 2015–2021 Genesis G90 (HI)
- 2011–2015 Hyundai Equus (VI)
- 2011–2016 Hyundai Genesis
- 2012–2021 Kia K9

== Awards ==
The 4.6 Tau V8 Engine was named to the Wards 10 Best Engine Awards for 2009 and 2010. The Tau V8 received the award due to the engine's "velvety power delivery, competitive performance, and attainable price-- all of which epitomize the Korean auto maker's drive for world-class engineering", as quoted by Forbes. This was Hyundai Motor Co. Ltd. first appearance on Ward's 10 Best Engines list. The 5.0 Tau Engine was also named in the same awards for 2011.

== See also ==
- List of Hyundai engines
