= List of Top Gear (American TV series) episodes =

72 episodes of the History Channel television series Top Gear were broadcast. The show was presented by Tanner Foust, Adam Ferrara, Rutledge Wood, and The Stig.

== Series overview ==
Season	Episodes	Originally released	
Season	Episodes	First released	Last released
1	10	November 21, 2010	January 23, 2011
2	16	July 24, 2011	April 3, 2012
3	16	August 14, 2012	April 2, 2013
4	10	September 3, 2013	November 26, 2013
5	10	June 3, 2014	October 21, 2014
6	10	April 26, 2016	June 28, 2016

== Season 1 (2010–11) ==
No. overall	No. in season	Title	Original release date	US viewers (millions)
1	1	"Cobra Attack"	November 21, 2010	1.93
2	2	"Blind Drift"	November 28, 2010	1.28
3	3	"Flying Coupe DeVille"	December 5, 2010	1.30
4	4	"Halo vs. Velociraptor"	December 12, 2010	1.27
5	5	"Beater Boot Camp"	December 19, 2010	1.36
6	6	"Fast in Florida"	December 26, 2010	N/A
7	7	"Used Car Salesmen"	January 2, 2011	N/A
8	8	"Car vs. Plane"	January 9, 2011	1.14
9	9	"America's Toughest Truck"	January 16, 2011	2.05
10	10	"Best of Top Gear"	January 23, 2011	N/A

== Season 2 (2011–12) ==
No. overall	No. in season	Title	Original release date	US viewers (millions)
11	1	"Texas"	July 24, 2011	1.96
12	2	"First Cars"	July 31, 2011	2.12
13	3	"America's Strongest Pickup"	August 7, 2011	1.83
14	4	"Death Valley"	August 14, 2011	2.23
15	5	"Luxury Car Challenge"	August 21, 2011	1.81
16	6	"The $500 Challenge"	August 28, 2011	1.97
17	7	"Beating Tanner"	September 4, 2011	1.67
18	8	"Hollywood Cars"	September 18, 2011	1.52
19	9	"Big Rigs"	February 14, 2012	2.07
20	10	"Muscle Cars"	February 21, 2012	1.64
21	11	"Dangerous Cars"	February 28, 2012	1.74
22	12	"Continental Divide"	March 6, 2012	2.07
23	13	"Supercars"	March 13, 2012	2.21
24	14	"Limos"	March 20, 2012	1.72
25	15	"Rut's Show"	March 27, 2012	1.60
26	16	"Worst Cars"	April 3, 2012	1.58

== Season 3 (2012–13) ==
No. overall	No. in season	Title	Original release date	US viewers (millions)
27	1	"Police Cars"	August 14, 2012	1.7
28	2	"Small Cars"	August 21, 2012	2.07
29	3	"Cult Classics"	August 28, 2012	1.57
30	4	"One Tank"	September 4, 2012	2.02
31	5	"The Tractor Challenge"	September 18, 2012	1.72
32	6	"Monument to Moab"	September 25, 2012	1.83
33	7	"College Cars"	January 29, 2013	1.57
34	8	"America's Toughest Car"	February 5, 2013	1.87
35	9	"RVs"	February 12, 2013	1.60
36	10	"150 MPH Challenge"	February 19, 2013	2.01
37	11	"Best Taxi Challenge"	February 26, 2013	1.60
38	12	"Adam's Show"	March 5, 2013	1.69
39	13	"Doomsday Drive"	March 12, 2013	1.72
40	14	"Mammoth Mountain"	March 19, 2013	1.88
41	15	"Minnesota Ice Driving"	March 26, 2013	1.98
42	16	"Viking Trucks"	April 2, 2013	2.17

== Season 4 (2013) ==
No. overall	No. in season	Title	Original release date	US viewers (millions)
43	1	"Coast to Coast"	September 3, 2013	2.01
44	2	"Alaskan Adventure"	September 10, 2013	1.45
45	3	"Off Road Racing"	September 17, 2013	1.54
46	4	"America's Biggest Cars"	September 24, 2013	1.88
47	5	"Sturgis"	October 22, 2013	1.73
48	6	"Can Cars Float?"	October 29, 2013	1.58
49	7	"Fully Charged"	November 5, 2013	1.13
50	8	"American Supercars"	November 12, 2013	N/A
51	9	"Big Bad Trucks"	November 19, 2013	N/A
52	10	"Fountain of Youth"	November 26, 2013	N/A

== Season 5 (2014) ==
No. overall	No. in season	Title	Original release date	US viewers (millions)
53	1	"American Muscle"	June 3, 2014	1.26
54	2	"Desert Trailblazers"	June 10, 2014	1.21
55	3	"80s Power"	June 17, 2014	1.26
56	4	"Snow Show"	June 24, 2014	1.36
57	5	"Off Road Big Rigs"	July 1, 2014	1.3
58	6	"Cool Cars for Grownups"	July 8, 2014	1.09
59	7	"What Can It Take?"	September 30, 2014	N/A
60	8	"Need for Speed"	October 7, 2014	N/A
61	9	"Weekend Race Cars"	October 14, 2014	N/A
62	10	"Appalachian Trail"	October 21, 2014	1.24

== Season 6 (2016) ==
No. overall	No. in season	Title	Original release date	US viewers (millions)
63	1	"Rubicon Trail"	April 26, 2016	N/A
64	2	"America vs. Europe"	April 26, 2016	N/A
65	3	"24 Hours of Budget Racing"	May 3, 2016	N/A
66	4	"Cars for Life"	May 10, 2016	N/A
67	5	"Military Might"	May 17, 2016	N/A
68	6	"American Aftermarket"	May 24, 2016	N/A
69	7	"Postal"	June 7, 2016	N/A
70	8	"Winter Drop Top"	June 14, 2016	N/A
71	9	"City Saviors"	June 21, 2016	N/A
72	10	"Cuba"	June 28, 2016	N/A
