= Speed Road Tour Challenge =

Speed Road Tour Challenge is a reality television game show (or "game opera") that aired on the now-defunct United States cable/satellite network Speed Channel. The host was Rutledge Wood.

Four contestants traveled together on a tour bus, similar to those used on musical concert tours, as they traveled between various race tracks that host NASCAR Cup Series races. There were 13 episodes, each corresponding to the races on the NASCAR on Fox schedule (Fox and Speed Channel have the same parent company, News Corporation). The series debuted on February 15, 2007 and the finale was held on May 24.

Each show had a reward challenge in which points were awarded to the contestants based on their performance. The winner of each challenge got a reward related to NASCAR racing, the losers were punished (e.g. cleaning bathrooms or disposing of garbage at the track). The contestant with the most points at the end of the 13 weeks won a job with Speed Channel.

During the competition, there were two cast changes. The first came when Eric Frega, a contestant from Riverside, California, withdrew from the competition after the casting episode before the season began for reasons that were not disclosed. Then, after the Kobalt Tools 500, Becky Patterson left the Challenge because she did not feel comfortable competing on the show.

On the season finale, John was announced as the winner of the Challenge. Wood implied that his job with the network would be as an intern traveling with its production staff to the remaining races of the 2007 NASCAR Cup Series season. of Charlotte, North Carolina, finished second, followed by Carrie McGaha Tyler and Estee. Carrie joined the show after Becky withdrew, and John replaced Eric just before the start of competition. John led the points after the half-way point in the show and never looked back, winning a brand new Toyota Tundra and the SPEED Channel job.
