= 2012 Global RallyCross Championship =

Seasons
- ← 2011 2013 →

The second season of the Global RallyCross Championship was held in 2012. The season was composed by 6 rounds, including one round in the X Games. Tanner Foust was crowned champion for the second time, beating teammate Brian Deegan.

== Teams and drivers ==
Constructor Team	Car	Individual Team	No.	Drivers	Rounds
(Sweden) Olsbergs MSE	2012 Ford Fiesta	Best Buy Mobile Olsbergs MSE	3	(Finland) Marcus Grönholm	1–3
(Sweden) Olsbergs MSE	2012 Ford Fiesta	Best Buy Mobile Olsbergs MSE	3	(Sweden) Andréas Eriksson	5
(Sweden) Olsbergs MSE	2012 Ford Fiesta	Best Buy Mobile Olsbergs MSE	3	(Russia) Timur Timerzyanov	6
(Sweden) Olsbergs MSE	2012 Ford Fiesta	Best Buy Serve Olsbergs MSE	17	(United Kingdom) David Binks	All
(Sweden) Olsbergs MSE	2012 Ford Fiesta	Rockstar Etnies Olsbergs MSE	34	(United States) Tanner Foust	All
(Sweden) Olsbergs MSE	2012 Ford Fiesta	Rockstar Metal Mulisha Olsbergs MSE	38	(United States) Brian Deegan	All
(Sweden) Olsbergs MSE	2012 Ford Fiesta	Bluebeam Olsbergs MSE	57	(Finland) Toomas Heikkinen	1–3, 5–6
(United States) Subaru Puma Rallycross Team USA	2012 Subaru Impreza WRX STI	Subaru Puma Rallycross Team USA	11	(Norway) Sverre Isachsen	All
(United States) Subaru Puma Rallycross Team USA	2012 Subaru Impreza WRX STI	Subaru Puma Rallycross Team USA	40	(United States) Dave Mirra	All
(United States) Subaru Puma Rallycross Team USA	2012 Subaru Impreza WRX STI	Subaru Puma Rallycross Team USA	75	(United Kingdom) David Higgins	3
(United States) Subaru Puma Rallycross Team USA	2012 Subaru Impreza WRX STI	Subaru Puma Rallycross Team USA	81	(United States) Bucky Lasek	All
(United States) Rhys Millen Racing	2012 Hyundai Veloster	Motorcity Disney XD Rhys Millen Racing	12	(France) Stéphane Verdier	All
(United States) Rhys Millen Racing	2012 Hyundai Veloster	Hyundai Rallycross Rhys Millen Racing	67	(New Zealand) Rhys Millen	1–3, 5–6
(United Kingdom) Scott-Eklund Racing	2010 Saab 9-3	Scott-Eklund Racing	26	(United Kingdom) Andy Scott	1–4
(United Kingdom) Scott-Eklund Racing	2010 Saab 9-3	ENEOS Motor Oil Scott-Eklund Racing	77	(Sweden) Samuel Hübinette	All
(United Kingdom) Monster Energy Citroën Rallycross Team	Citroën C4 WRC	Monster Energy Citroën Rallycross Team	33	(United Kingdom) Liam Doran	2–4, 6
(Canada) Team 41	Subaru Impreza WRX STI	Team 41	41	(Canada) Richard Burton	1, 4–5
(United States) Monster World Rally Team	2012 Ford Fiesta	Monster World Rally Team Ford Racing	43	(United States) Ken Block	All
(United States) PMR Motorsports	2007 Subaru Impreza WRX STI	PMR Motorsports	47	(United States) Tim Rooney	1
(United States) PMR Motorsports	2007 Subaru Impreza WRX STI	PMR Motorsports	59	(United States) Patrick Moro	1–2, 4–6
(Sweden) Hansen Motorsport	2012 Citroën DS3	Red Bull Citroën	72	(France) Sébastien Loeb	3
(United States) Pastrana 199 Racing	2013 Dodge Dart	Pastrana 199 Racing	99	(Portugal) Filipe Albuquerque	2
(United States) Pastrana 199 Racing	2013 Dodge Dart	Pastrana 199 Racing	99	(United States) Bryce Menzies	3, 6
(United States) Pastrana 199 Racing	2013 Dodge Dart	Pastrana 199 Racing	199	(United States) Travis Pastrana	1–5
(United States) Jimmy Keeney	Subaru Impreza WRX STI	MCM / Venom/ProDesigns	418	(United States) Jimmy Keeney	2, 6

== Schedule ==
Round	Location	Other Event	Date
1	(United States) Charlotte Motor Speedway	NASCAR Sprint Cup Series	May 26
2	(United States) Texas Motor Speedway	IZOD IndyCar Series	June 9
3	(United States) X Games, Los Angeles (L.A. Live)	X Games XVIII	June 30 – July 1
4	(United States) New Hampshire Motor Speedway	NASCAR Sprint Cup Series	July 14
5	(United States) Las Vegas Motor Speedway	NASCAR Camping World Truck Series	September 29
6	(United States) Las Vegas Convention Center	Speciality Equipment Market Association	October 30

== Season summary ==
GRC opened its season on a Saturday night at Charlotte with a 17-car field and two sets of heat races, and it was clear from the first practice session that the two drivers to beat were going to be Marcus Grönholm and Tanner Foust of Olsbergs MSE. After qualifying 1–2, each driver won both of their heat races to advance to the final. But a handful of big names wouldn't have such an easy time advancing. Ken Block suffered a spectacular accident in his first heat race, effectively ending his night before it got started. Fellow Olsbergs driver Brian Deegan won his first heat race, but a burnt-out clutch prevented him from finishing the second or making it to the last chance qualifier. Travis Pastrana also had an incident in his first heat, but won the second to advance to the final. From there, it was more of the same up front, with Gronholm and Foust coming home 1–2. Stephan Verdier, in his first race with Rhys Millen Racing, rounded out the podium. Meanwhile, Toomas Heikkinen's aggressive driving in the final earned him a disqualification and the ire of his competitors, including Pastrana and Dave Mirra.

Texas marked the debut of the 70-foot metal gap jump, which proved an obstacle to most drivers at first; Travis Pastrana spent most of practice in his teammate's car after breaking his in jump practice. But drivers figured out the jump in time for qualifying, where once again, Marcus Grönholm and Tanner Foust placed first and second. In a sign of things to come for much of the season, Gronholm, Foust, Brian Deegan, and Samuel Hubinette would win the four heat races. But it was the second of two last chance qualifiers that may have proved most exciting, as Bucky Lasek drove sideways off of the jump and onto a barrier, and other drivers were eliminated one by one until Stephan Verdier was the only one left and thus advanced to the final. Ford and Olsbergs MSE would dominate the final, scoring four of the top five positions as Gronholm, Foust, and Deegan came home 1-2-3 and David Binks finished fifth. Meanwhile, the top 12 drivers in points earned automatic qualifying berths for X Games, held in Los Angeles the next month.

At X Games, two spectacular crashes in practice for Olsbergs MSE teammates Toomas Heikkinen and Marcus Grönholm caused both drivers would miss the race due to injury. Meanwhile, GRC officials nixed the joker lap that ran between the gap in favor of a tabletop jump and no joker lap for Sunday's race. After being challenged by Travis Pastrana, legendary rally driver Sébastien Loeb took a European-honed Citroen to the States to try and conquer his first X Games. It didn't take long for him to establish himself as the man to beat when he won his heat race. Unfortunately, Pastrana's rough season would continue after he suffered terminal damage in the first corner of his heat after an accident with Andy Scott, and was not allowed to replace teammate Bryce Menzies in the other car. For the second race in a row, the ten drivers in the main event would require three attempts to get it right. Loeb would cruise to an easy victory in the valid final, with Ken Block putting in a heroic drive for second on a punctured tire and Brian Deegan winning a medal for the second year in a row by coming in third. Rhys Millen would finish fourth, while Liam Doran, who had taken a surprise gold medal in 2011's head-to-head competition, rounded out the top five.

The absences of Marcus Grönholm, Toomas Heikkinen, and Rhys Millen meant that the series would see a short field of 14 cars and only three heat races at New Hampshire. That entry list might have shrunk even further when Ken Block rolled off of the elevated hairpin in qualifying, necessitating a long night of repairs for his team. Drivers would face the figure eight track on Saturday, adjusting to a longer joker lap and the addition for dirt for the first time on a paved oval. Tanner Foust and Brian Deegan both won their heat races, as expected, but after three straight races of futility, it was Travis Pastrana's time to run up front as well. He and Samuel Hubinette battled fearlessly for the lead in their heat race, with Pastrana eventually earning the advantage. In the final, Foust looked to win his first race of the season and establish himself as the new championship favorite, but after stalling on the elevated hairpin, both Pastrana and Hubinette muscled by, and Deegan would eventually get by as well to take the third step on the podium. Even so, Foust would take a 12-point lead over Hubinette into the final two races of the season.

Tanner Foust and Brian Deegan had both pride and $25,000 on the line in Las Vegas, as both fought for the Discount Tire/America's Tire Cup awarded to the top driver at this race, Texas, and New Hampshire. Foust asserted himself as the man to beat in qualifying, beating Ken Block, Travis Pastrana, and a fully recovered Toomas Heikkinen. Deegan would qualify seventh, while Olsbergs MSE team owner Andreas Eriksson, substituting for Marcus Grönholm, would qualify eighth. The first heat would see a scary accident, as Richard Burton slid sideways off of the jump and into the landing pad, totaling his car and injuring his back in the process. In the second heat, Eriksson would toss away a victory by spinning in the final corner, doing donuts to entertain the fans as Block and Rhys Millen took the two transfer spots. Pastrana also goofed in the third heat by taking the shortcut twice, but both he and Eriksson would advance in the last chance qualifier. Block and Eriksson made contact in the first corner of the final, as Foust, Deegan, and Heikkinen attempted to give Olsbergs its second podium sweep of the year. Subaru's Sverre Isachsen would sneak by Heikkinen for third, earning them their first podium of the season, while Foust would hold off Deegan for the race win and $25,000 prize. They would enter the season finale as the only drivers eligible for the title, as Samuel Hubinette missed the main event.

Facing a six-point deficit to Olsbergs MSE teammate Tanner Foust in the championship standings, Brian Deegan would need a lot of luck at SEMA to steal the GRC title. The track, constructed in a parking lot outside of the Las Vegas Convention Center, featured significantly more dirt than most others, and opened up the cars to put on the best show of the season. Foust and Deegan would each win their heat race on the first day, but while Foust backed it up with another win on Tuesday, Deegan would fall to the last chance qualifier after suffering a puncture in his second heat race. Despite his crew racing against the clock, Deegan would make it to the grid in time for the last chance qualifier and advance to the main event. Ken Block had been the man to beat all week, pacing the field through qualifying and his heat races and looking to win his first race of the season in the finale. He might have done so if not for an exhaust fire two laps into the main event that limited his driving, enabled Foust to pass him, and eventually put him out of the race with two laps to go, forcing a restart. It couldn't have been more fortunate for Deegan, who had been a non-factor in the first attempt and seized his second chance. He jumped from the back of the grid to the front by braking late in the first corner and began to work on chasing down Foust. But the race win and championship slipped out of reach as the laps wound down; Foust would take his second race win and championship in a row over Deegan and Rhys Millen, who earned his first career GRC podium and tied Hubinette for third in points.

== Results ==
=== Events ===
No.	Event	Seeding Round	Heat A	Heat B	Winner	Team	Manufacturer
1	Charlotte	(Finland) M. Grönholm	(Finland) M. Gronholm (United States) T. Foust (United States) B. Deegan (Finland) T. Heikkinen	(Finland) M. Gronholm (United States) T. Foust (United States) T. Pastrana (Sweden) S. Hübinette	(Finland) Marcus Grönholm	(Sweden) Olsbergs MSE	Ford
2	Texas	(Finland) M. Grönholm	(Finland) M. Gronholm (Sweden) S. Hübinette (United States) B. Deegan (United States) T. Foust		(Finland) Marcus Grönholm	(Sweden) Olsbergs MSE	Ford
3	Los Angeles	(United States) K. Block	(Sweden) S. Hübinette (France) S. Loeb (Norway) S. Isachsen (United Kingdom) D. Binks		(France) Sébastien Loeb	(Sweden) Hansen Motorsport	Citroën
4	Loudon	(United States) T. Foust	(United States) T. Foust (United States) B. Deegan (United States) T. Pastrana		(United States) Travis Pastrana	(United States) Pastrana 199 Racing	Dodge
5	Las Vegas	(United States) T. Foust	(United States) T. Foust (United States) K. Block (United States) B. Deegan		(United States) Tanner Foust	(Sweden) Olsbergs MSE	Ford
6	Las Vegas CC	(United States) K. Block	(United States) T. Foust (United States) K. Block (Russia) T. Timerzyanov (United States) B. Deegan	(United States) T. Foust (United States) K. Block	(United States) Tanner Foust	(Sweden) Olsbergs MSE	Ford

=== Drivers standings ===
- **Bold** indicates the fastest in the seeding round.
- * indicates a heat win.

Pos.	Drivers	Team	CHA (United States)	TEX (United States)	LA (United States)	NH (United States)	LVS (United States)	LVC (United States)	Pts
1	(United States) Tanner Foust	Rockstar Etnies Olsbergs MSE	2	2	6	4	1	1	94
2	(United States) Brian Deegan	Rockstar Metal Mulisha Olsbergs MSE	16	3	3	3	2	2	84
3	(Sweden) Samuel Hübinette	ENEOS Motor Oil Scott-Eklund Racing	5	7	9	2	12	4	63
4	(New Zealand) Rhys Millen	Hyundai Rallycross Rhys Millen Racing	6	4	4		6	3	63
5	(United States) Ken Block	Monster World Rally Team	15	8	2	5	7	10	58
6	(France) Stéphane Verdier	Motorcity Disney XD Rhys Millen Racing	3	6	12	9	5	11	52
7	(Finland) Marcus Grönholm	Best Buy Mobile Olsbergs MSE	1	1	Inj	Inj	Inj	Inj	43
8	(United Kingdom) David Binks	Best Buy Serve Olsbergs MSE	7	5	8	8	14	DNS	42
9	(Norway) Sverre Isachsen	Subaru Puma Rallycross Team USA	12	10	10	13	3	12	40
10	(United States) Travis Pastrana	Red Bull Boost Mobile Pastrana 199 Racing	8	15	16	1	10		39
11	(United Kingdom) Andy Scott	Scott-Eklund Racing	4	9	11	6			38
12	(United States) Dave Mirra	Subaru Puma Rallycross Team USA	9	11	15	10	13	6	35
13	(United States) Bucky Lasek	Subaru Puma Rallycross Team USA	11	14	13	11	8	7	35
14	(Finland) Toomas Heikkinen	Bluebeam Olsbergs MSE	10	18	Inj	Inj	4	5	33
15	(United Kingdom) Liam Doran	Monster Energy Citroën Rallycross Team		12	5	7		14	30
16	(United States) Patrick Moro	PMR Motorsports	14	13		12	11	13	22
17	(France) Sébastien Loeb	Hansen Motorsport			1				21
18	(United States) Bryce Menzies	Pastrana 199 Racing			14			8	12
19	(United Kingdom) David Higgins	Subaru Puma Rallycross Team USA			7				9
20	(Russia) Timur Timerzyanov	Best Buy Mobile Olsbergs MSE						9	9
21	(Sweden) Andréas Eriksson	Best Buy Mobile Olsbergs MSE					9		8
22	(Canada) Richard Burton	Team 41	17			14	15		5
23	(United States) Tim Rooney	PMR Motorsports	13						4
24	(Portugal) Filipe Albuquerque	Pastrana 199 Racing		16					1
25	(United States) Jimmy Keeney	MCM / Venom/ProDesigns		17				DNS	0
Pos.	Drivers	Team	CHA (United States)	TEX (United States)	LA (United States)	NH (United States)	LVS (United States)	LVC (United States)	Pts

Key
Colour	Result
Gold	Winner
Silver	2nd place
Bronze	3rd place
Green	Points finish
Blue	Non-points finish
Blue	Non-classified finish (NC)
Purple	Did not finish (Ret)
Black	Excluded (EX)
Black	Disqualified (DSQ)
White	Did not start (DNS)
White	Cancelled (C)
Blank	Withdrew entry from the event (WD)
