= Battle of the Supercars =

- Starring: Lee Reherman, Tanner Foust and Paul Tracy
- Country of origin: United States
- No. of episodes: 13

Production
- Running time: 30 minutes

Original release
- Network: Speed Channel
- Release: 22 July – 14 October 2010

Battle of the Supercars was a weekly motorsports television show. Hosted by Lee Reherman, it featured professional race drivers Tanner Foust and Paul Tracy putting supercars in head to head competition with one another.

== Episode list ==
#	Original airdate	Episode Title	Foust's Car	Tracy's Car	Track
1	2010-07-22	Turbo 6 Challenge	Porsche 997 Twin Turbo	Nissan GTR	Mojave Air and Spaceport
2	2008-07-22	Reconnaissance Mission	Porsche GT3 RS	Ferrari F430	Beale AFB
3	2008-07-29	Texas Muscle	2010 Shelby Mustang GT-500 supercharged	2010 Chevrolet Camaro turbocharged	?
