= 2009 Race of Champions =

Motor racing competition

Seasons
- ← 2008 2010 →

The Layout of the 2009 Race of Champions

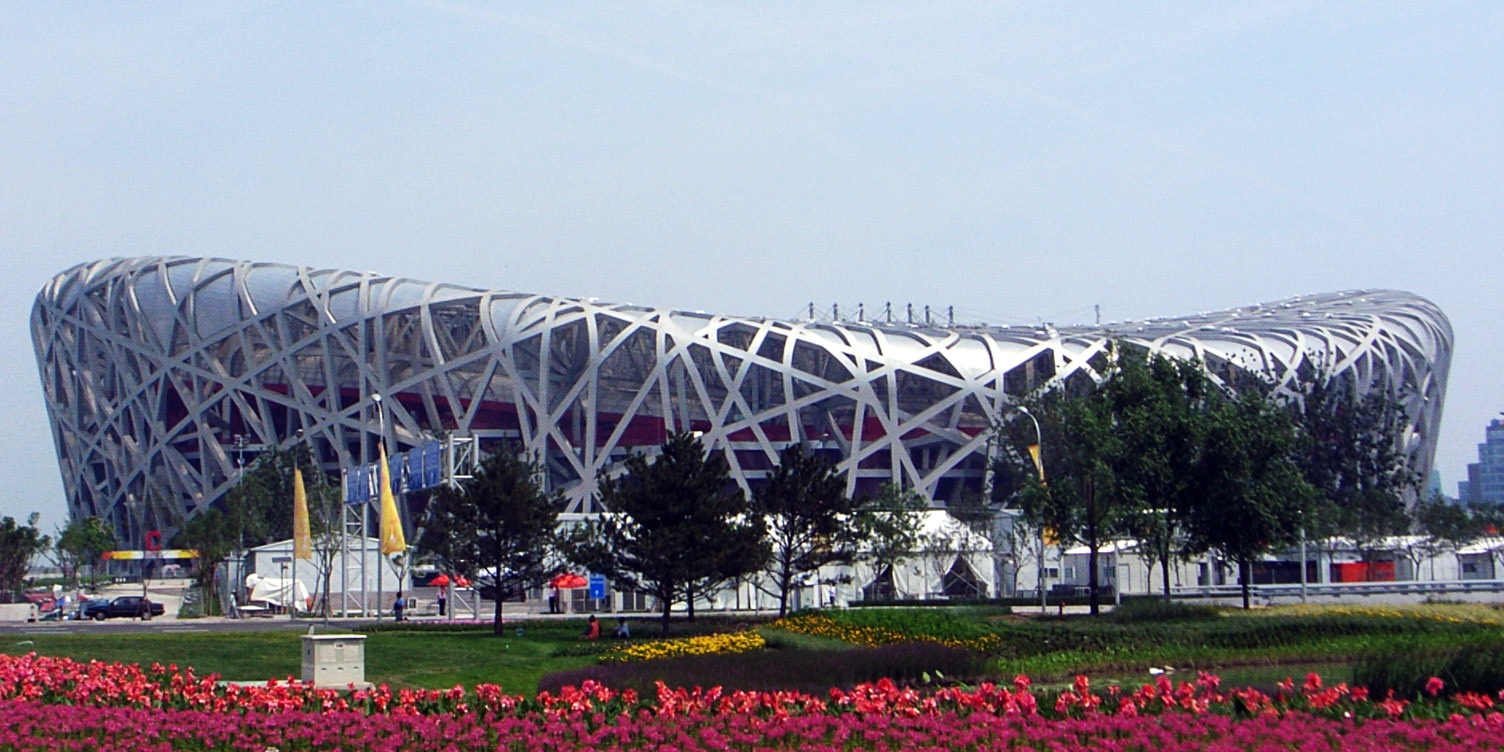
The Beijing National Stadium, is the venue for the 2009 Race of Champions.

The 2009 Race of Champions was the 22nd running of the motorsport event, on November 3–4, 2009 at the Beijing National Stadium in Beijing, China. It was the first time that the event took place outside of Europe and Africa. It was the first international sports event to be held in the "Bird's Nest" stadium since the 2008 Summer Olympics. The event was moved from a weekend to a midweek slot for the first time. The RoC Nations Cup was held on Tuesday, November 3, just two days after the 2009 Abu Dhabi Grand Prix, the climax of the 2009 Formula One season at the Yas Marina Circuit, with the Driver's Cup being contested on Wednesday 4, November.

The new dates affected the United States and Australia most, since it meant drivers from those countries' popular saloon-car series (V8 Supercar and NASCAR Sprint Cup Series) could not take part. Jamie Whincup of Triple Eight Race Engineering was originally selected to participate but could not because of the schedule, so two motorcyclists were used on the team. In the past, the United States team has used Nationwide Series champion Carl Edwards, and four-time Sprint Cup Series champion Jeff Gordon and Jimmie Johnson. Two X Games stars and Rally America drivers were chosen.

Mattias Ekström won the World Final for Team Scandinavia, while Sebastian Vettel and Michael Schumacher won the Nations Cup for Team Germany.

== South Europe Regional Final ==
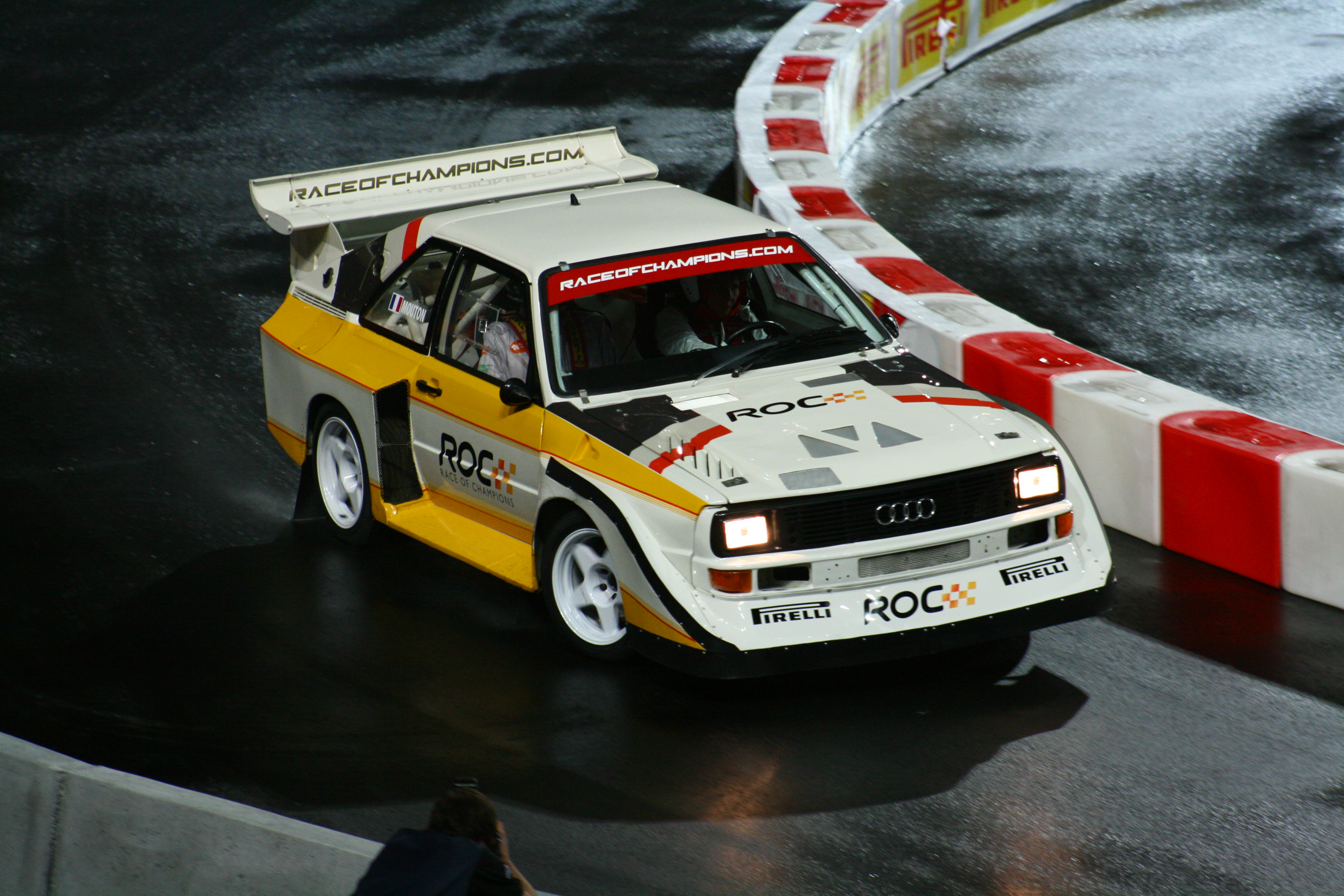
Michèle Mouton driving an Audi Quattro S1 during the South Europe finals

For the first ever time, regional finals were held to determine which nations will take part in Beijing. The first of these regional finals was for South Europe, featuring Portugal, Spain, Monaco and Italy. It was held in the Estádio do Dragão, the home of F.C. Porto on 6/7 June.

=== ROC Portugal ===
Miguel Barbosa won the ROC Portugal opener and was joined by A1 Grand Prix driver Filipe Albuquerque, José Pedro Fontes and team captain and Production World Rally Championship Armindo Araújo in the Portuguese team.

=== ROC Iberia ===
The Portuguese team faced a Spanish team made up of team captain World Rally Champion Carlos Sainz, Citroën WRC driver Dani Sordo, World Series by Renault driver Jaime Alguersuari and rally driver Sergio Vallejo in the ROC Iberia. Albuquerque beat Sordo by two heats to nil in the Iberian final.

=== ROC South Europe Finals ===
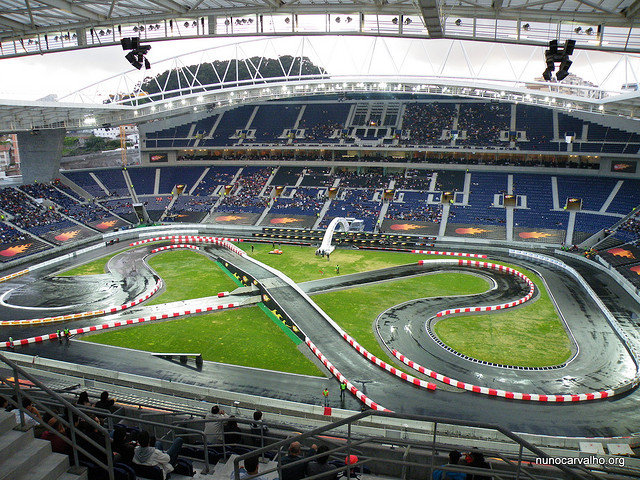
Dragon Stagium's pitch converted into a race track for the ROC 2009 Southern Europe Regional Final.

The Spanish pairing of Sainz and Sordo faced the Italian pairing of former World Rally champion Miki Biasion and current WRC driver Gigi Galli in the first semi-final. Spain won by three heats to nil. The Portuguese pairing of Albuquerque and Araujo faced Monaco, featuring A1GP driver Clivio Piccione and Le Mans 24 Hours winner Emanuele Pirro, who although born in Italy, has been a resident of Monaco for over 22 years. After four of five heats the score was balanced at 2–2, before Piccione beat Albuquerque by one ten thousandth of a second, the narrowest margin of victory in Race of Champions history. The Monegasque pairing beat the Spanish pair by three heats to one in the final to send Monaco through to the main event in November.

=== ROC Legends ===
There was also a RoC Legends competition on the Saturday evening, featuring Sainz, Biasion, Pirro, Johnny Herbert, Heinz-Harald Frentzen, Mick Doohan, Andy Priaulx and Pedro Chaves. Priaulx beat Herbert in the Legends final by two heats to one.

== Participants ==
Team	Drivers	2009 series
(Scotland) (South Africa) All-Stars	David Coulthard	none
(Scotland) (South Africa) All-Stars	Giniel de Villiers	Cross Country World Cup
Australia	Mick Doohan	none
Australia	Chad Reed	AMA Motocross Championship
China	Han Han	Chinese Rally Championship
China	Ho-Pin Tung	A1 Grand Prix & Superleague Formula
Finland	Marcus Grönholm	none
Finland	Mikko Hirvonen	WRC
France	Guerlain Chicherit	Cross Country World Cup
France	Yvan Muller	WTCC
Germany	Michael Schumacher	none/Formula One testing
Germany	Sebastian Vettel	Formula One
(United Kingdom) Great Britain	Jenson Button	Formula One
(United Kingdom) Great Britain	Andy Priaulx	WTCC
Monaco	Clivio Piccione	A1 Grand Prix
Monaco	Emanuele Pirro	none
(Denmark) (Sweden) Scandinavia	Mattias Ekström	DTM
(Denmark) (Sweden) Scandinavia	Tom Kristensen	DTM
United States	Tanner Foust	X Games & Rally America
United States	Travis Pastrana	X Games & Rally America

- Jamie Whincup originally was confirmed to participate, but later withdrew due to a scheduling conflict with the V8 Supercars Championship. Chad Reed took his place.
- The two fastest Chinese drivers in the ROC China Challenge would represent their nation in the Nations Cup.

== Cars ==
- Ford Focus RS WRC
- KTM X-Bow
- ROC Car
- RX Racing RX150
- Solution F Prototype
- Volkswagen Scirocco

== ROC China ==
Round 1
(China)	H. Han	2:23.923
(China)	Y. Zhou	DNF
(China)	Z. G. Ren	2:09.466
(China)	C. H. Huang	2:10.420
(China)	Y. Liu	2:07.540
(China)	L. F. Lin	2:09.921
(China)	D. A. Chen	2:08.246
(China)	H. S. Guo	2:10.914
(China)	H. J. Wei	2:10.355
(China)	H. B. Dong	2:06.955
(China)	R. Wang	2:10.579
(China)	C. D. Liu	2:08.815
(China)	B. Liu	2:07.976
(China)	D. J. Wu	2:10.044
(China)	S. F. Wang	2:06.304
(China)	N. J. Lu	2:13.080

Quarter-Finals
(China)	H. Han	2:10.148
(China)	Z. G. Ren	2:11.272
(China)	Y. Liu	2:07.809
(China)	D. A. Chen	2:08.482
(China)	H. B. Dong	2:09.551
(China)	C. D. Liu	2:11.409
(China)	B. Liu	2:06.635
(China)	S. F. Wang	2:06.097

Semi-Finals
(China)	H. Han	2:07.639
(China)	Y. Liu	2:08.598
(China)	H. B. Dong	2:32.583
(China)	S. F. Wang	DNF

Final
(China)	H. Han	2:07.311
(China)	H. B. Dong	2:05.181

== ROC Nations Cup ==
=== Group A ===
Pos	Team	Races	W	L	Best Time
1	Germany	6	6	0	3:55.963
2	China	6	3	3	4:04.314
3	Finland	6	2	4	4:00.151
4	Australia	6	1	5	4:04.386

Team 1	Time 1	Score	Team 2	Time 2	Car
Germany		2–0	Australia		
Michael Schumacher	2:00.012	2–0	Mick Doohan	2:28.424	
Sebastian Vettel	1:59.381	2–0	Chad Reed	2:05.807	
Germany		2–0	China		
Michael Schumacher	2:03.192	2–0	Han Han	DNF	
Sebastian Vettel	1:55.951	2–0	Ho-Pin Tung	1:58.345	
Germany		2–0	Finland		
Michael Schumacher	2:00.636	2–0	Mikko Hirvonen	2:01.243	
Sebastian Vettel	1:56.085	2–0	Marcus Grönholm	2:01.587	

Team 1	Time 1	Score	Team 2	Time 2	Car
China		2–0	Australia		
Han Han	2:14.570	2–0	Mick Doohan	2:48.088	
Ho-Pin Tung	1:58.537	2–0	Chad Reed	2:01.505	
Finland		1–1	Australia		
Mikko Hirvonen	2:00.264	1–1	Mick Doohan	2:05.545	
Marcus Grönholm	1:59.787	1–1	Chad Reed	1:58.841	
China		1–1	Finland		
Han Han	2:05.969	1–1	Mikko Hirvonen	2:05.819	
Ho-Pin Tung	2:04.234	1–1	Marcus Grönholm	2:05.180	

=== Group B ===
Pos	Team	Races	W	L	Best Time
1	(United Kingdom) Great Britain	4	4	0	3:55.111
2	(Scotland) (South Africa) All-Stars	4	1	3	3:58.339
3	Monaco	4	1	3	3:58.882

Team 1	Time 1	Score	Team 2	Time 2	Car
(United Kingdom) Great Britain		2–0	(Scotland) (South Africa) All-Stars		
Jenson Button	2:00.394	2–0	David Coulthard	2:00.964	
Andy Priaulx	1:58.399	2–0	Giniel de Villiers	2:02.927	
(United Kingdom) Great Britain		2–0	Monaco		
Jenson Button	1:59.109	2–0	Clivio Piccione	2:01.408	
Andy Priaulx	1:56.002	2–0	Emanuele Pirro	1:57.466	
Monaco		1–1	(United Kingdom) (South Africa) All-Stars		
Clivio Piccione	2:01.416	1–1	David Coulthard	1:58.824	
Emanuele Pirro	1:58.607	1–1	Giniel de Villiers	1:59.515	

=== Group C ===
Pos	Team	Races	W	L	Best Time
1	United States	4	2	2	4:09.184
2	France	4	2	2	4:09.208
3	(Denmark) (Sweden) Scandinavia	4	2	2	4:10.252

Team 1	Time 1	Score	Team 2	Time 2	Car
France		1–1	(Denmark) (Sweden) Scandinavia		
Yvan Muller	2:00.635	1–1	Tom Kristensen	DNF	
Guerlain Chicherit	DNF	1–1	Mattias Ekström	2:13.070	
(Denmark) (Sweden) Scandinavia		1–1	United States		
Tom Kristensen	2:05.039	1–1	Tanner Foust	2:03.692	
Mattias Ekström	2:05.213	1–1	Travis Pastrana	2:05.776	
United States		1–1	France		
Tanner Foust	2:03.408	1–1	Yvan Muller	2:03.104	
Travis Pastrana	2:06.738	1–1	Guerlain Chicherit	2:08.573	ROC Car

=== Knockout stages ===
Semi-Finals
A1	Germany	2
C1	United States	1
A2	China	1
B1	(United Kingdom) Great Britain	2

Final
A1	Germany	2
B1	(United Kingdom) Great Britain	1

==== Semifinals ====
Team 1	Time 1	Score	Team 2	Time 2	Car
Germany		2–1	United States		
Michael Schumacher	2:03.615	2–1	Tanner Foust	2:03.281	ROC Car
Sebastian Vettel	1:55.212	2–1	Travis Pastrana	1:55.582	Ford Focus RS WRC
Sebastian Vettel	2:03.167	2–1	Tanner Foust	2:04.084	ROC Car
China		1–2	(United Kingdom) Great Britain		
Han Han	2:06.654	1–2	Jenson Button	2:03.201	ROC Car
Ho-Pin Tung	1:57.890	1–2	Andy Priaulx	2:01.565	Solution F Prototype
Ho-Pin Tung	2:04.477	1–2	Jenson Button	2:01.544	ROC Car

==== Final ====
Team 1	Time 1	Score	Team 2	Time 2	Car
Germany		2–1	(United Kingdom) Great Britain		
Michael Schumacher	1:59.348	2–1	Jenson Button	1:59.842	ROC Car
Sebastian Vettel	2:13.299	2–1	Andy Priaulx	1:52.479	Ford Focus RS WRC
Michael Schumacher	2:01.200	2–1	Andy Priaulx	2:02.364	ROC Car

== World Final ==
=== Round 1 ===
Semi-finals
(Monaco) Clivio Piccione	1:59.759
(China) Ho-Pin Tung	2:03.870
(United States) Tanner Foust	2:02.205
(Monaco) Emanuele Pirro	2:18.797

Final
(Monaco) Clivio Piccione	2:04.098
(United States) Tanner Foust	2:01.233

=== Group A ===
Pos	Team	Races	W	L	Best Time
1	(United Kingdom) Jenson Button	3	3	0	1:57.627
2	(Denmark) Tom Kristensen	3	2	1	1:58.305
3	(United States) Tanner Foust	3	1	2	1:57.677
4	(France) Guerlain Chicherit	3	0	3	2:03.938

Driver 1	Time 1	Car	Driver 2	Time 2
(United Kingdom) Jenson Button	2:00.085		(Denmark) Tom Kristensen	2:01.381
(France) Guerlain Chicherit	2:04.486		(United States) Tanner Foust	2:00.578
(United States) Tanner Foust	1:57.677	Solution F Prototype	(United Kingdom) Jenson Button	1:57.627
(Denmark) Tom Kristensen	1:58.305		(France) Guerlain Chicherit	DNF
(France) Guerlain Chicherit	2:03.938	KTM X-Bow	(United Kingdom) Jenson Button	1:59.174
(United States) Tanner Foust	2:04.512	KTM X-Bow	(Denmark) Tom Kristensen	1:59.136

=== Group B ===
Pos	Team	Races	W	L	Best Time
1	(Sweden) Mattias Ekström	3	3	0	1:58.276
2	(United Kingdom) Andy Priaulx	3	2	1	1:59.860
3	(Australia) Mick Doohan	3	1	2	2:04.325
4	(United States) Travis Pastrana	3	0	3	2:04.208

Driver 1	Time 1	Car	Driver 2	Time 2
(Sweden) Mattias Ekström	1:58.551		(United Kingdom) Andy Priaulx	1:59.860
(Australia) Mick Doohan	2:04.325		(United States) Travis Pastrana	2:04.402
(United States) Travis Pastrana	2:04.208		(Sweden) Mattias Ekström	2:02.174
(United Kingdom) Andy Priaulx	2:04.801		(Australia) Mick Doohan	2:05.229
(Australia) Mick Doohan	DNF	KTM X-Bow	(Sweden) Mattias Ekström	1:58.276
(United States) Travis Pastrana	DNF	KTM X-Bow	(United Kingdom) Andy Priaulx	2:00.043

=== Group C ===
Pos	Team	Races	W	L	Best Time
1	(Germany) Sebastian Vettel	3	3	0	1:51.442
2	(Finland) Mikko Hirvonen	3	2	1	1:51.094
3	(Australia) Chad Reed	3	1	2	1:54.247
4	(South Africa) Giniel de Villiers	3	0	3	1:53.626

Driver 1	Time 1	Car	Driver 2	Time 2
(Germany) Sebastian Vettel	2:00.363		(Finland) Mikko Hirvonen	2:02.567
(Australia) Chad Reed	2:02.391	ROC Car	(South Africa) Giniel de Villiers	2:04.247
(South Africa) Giniel de Villiers	1:53.626	Ford Focus RS WRC	(Germany) Sebastian Vettel	1:51.442
(Finland) Mikko Hirvonen	1:51.094	Ford Focus RS WRC	(Australia) Chad Reed	1:54.247
(Australia) Chad Reed	DNF		(Germany) Sebastian Vettel	1:58.583
(South Africa) Giniel de Villiers	2:04.437		(Finland) Mikko Hirvonen	2:01.859

=== Group D ===
Pos	Team	Races	W	L	Best Time
1	(Germany) Michael Schumacher	3	3	0	1:58.644
2	(Scotland) David Coulthard	3	2	1	1:58.547
3	(France) Yvan Muller	3	1	2	1:58.956
4	(Finland) Marcus Grönholm	3	0	3	2:00.835

Driver 1	Time 1	Car	Driver 2	Time 2
(Germany) Michael Schumacher	1:58.644		(Scotland) David Coulthard	2:00.503
(Finland) Marcus Grönholm	2:01.456		(France) Yvan Muller	2:00.191
(France) Yvan Muller	2:01.474		(Germany) Michael Schumacher	1:59.296
(Scotland) David Coulthard	2:00.259		(Finland) Marcus Grönholm	2:00.835
(Finland) Marcus Grönholm	2:02.111	KTM X-Bow	(Germany) Michael Schumacher	1:59.907
(France) Yvan Muller	1:58.956	KTM X-Bow	(Scotland) David Coulthard	1:58.547

=== Knockout stages ===
Quarter-finals
Ford Focus RS WRC
(United Kingdom) Jenson Button	1:51.375
(United Kingdom) Andy Priaulx	1:55.500
Solution F Prototype
(Sweden) Mattias Ekström	1:56.530
(Denmark) Tom Kristensen	1:57.814
ROC Car
(Germany) Sebastian Vettel	1:58.213
(Scotland) David Coulthard	1:58.930
KTM X-Bow
(Germany) Michael Schumacher	1:57.805
(Finland) Mikko Hirvonen	1:59.786

Semi-finals
Ford Focus RS WRC
(United Kingdom) Jenson Button	1:50.627
(Sweden) Mattias Ekström	1:49.500
KTM X-Bow
(Germany) Sebastian Vettel	DNF
(Germany) Michael Schumacher	1:57.940

Final
(Sweden) Mattias Ekström	2
(Germany) Michael Schumacher	0

==== Final ====
Driver 1	Time 1	Car	Driver 2	Time 2
(Sweden) Mattias Ekström	1:57.290	ROC Car	(Germany) Michael Schumacher	1:57.471
(Sweden) Mattias Ekström	1:56.044	KTM X-Bow	(Germany) Michael Schumacher	1:56.657
