= Hyundai PM580 =

LeMans-style race car by Rhys Millen Racing

Within motorsport, the RMR Hyundai Genesis PM580 (RMR PM580, Hyundai PM580, Hyundai RMR PM580) is a LeMans-style race car built by Rhys Millen Racing (RMR) racing to compete in the 2010 Pikes Peak International Hillclimb Unlimited class and designed to break the 2007 record time of 10:01.408 minutes set by Nobuhiro Tajima's in a Suzuki XL7 Hill Climb Special.

Weighing 1,850 pounds (839 kg) the PM580 is powered by a Hyundai Lambda engine with displacement increased from 3.8 litres (232 cu in) to 4.1 litres (250 cu in). The stock block, heads and valvetrain were retained, but an HKS T04Z turbocharger with an intercooler was added, producing 750 hp (559 kW; 760 PS) and 700 lb⋅ft (950 N⋅m) of torque. The engine is connected to a Weismann semi-automatic AWD transmission with a Tilton Racing clutch, routed through an active center differential, which allows a 10 to 100 percent torque split to the front wheels.

The PM580 also features exclusive RMR-tuned forced induction system from the 2011 Hyundai Sonata. The chassis is a lightweight, chromoly tube-framed, carbon fiber body with front and rear diffusers and a custom built Dynamic Wing by Aeromotions.

2010 Specifications

- Chromoly frame and roll cage
- Two Quaife differentials
- Weismann semi-automatic AWD transmission
- Tilton Racing clutch
- 3.8-liter Lambda V6 engine stroked to 4.1-liters
- HKS T04Z turbocharger
- Bar and plate intercooler
- Custom RMR stainless exhaust manifolds
- Carbon ceramic Brembo brakes and pads
- 17-inch HRE wheels
- 275/40 Toyo rear tires
- RMR custom carbon fiber body with front and rear diffusers
- Active wing by Aeromotions

In 2011, changes were made to address issues from the 2010 car. For 2011, the PM580 used the electronic power steering system from the 2011 Hyundai Sonata. It got a different transmission setup with only the casing being the same as the 2010. The torsen differential which was replaced by a clutch-plate component and final adjustments were made to the damper settings and spring rates and the HRE Wheels were used with softer Hankook tires. Aerodynamically, changes included a new front splitter, intercooler scoop and rear spoiler.

In 2013, RMR built a new version named Hyundai RMR PM580-T (Hyundai Genesis PM580T) to break the record in Pikes Peak previously held by the Hyundai RMR Genesis Coupe, although it placed 2nd overall. The PM580-T is again a Pikes Peak-specific prototype, based heavily on the previous PM580 prototype. The PM580-T was built using a Gen-1 Crawford Performance Engineering Daytona Prototype tubular monocoque chassis with aluminum honeycomb (manufactured in November 2005). Rhys Millen added a custom carbon-composite body modeled after the production Genesis Coupe's unique greenhouse silhouette. Total racing weight of only 2,150 pounds (975 kg).

Front and rear suspensions use sophisticated front and rear double A-arms with a pushrod setup and Penske 8760 racing dampers. The brakes are composed of iron rotors with six-piston front and four-piston rear Brembo calipers using Motul racing fluid, with oversized cooling ductwork routed outside of the frame for adequate brake rotor heat dissipation in the thin air of the Pike's Peaks extreme altitudes. Its aluminum radiator is tilted forward for improved airflow at altitude.

The PM580-T is powered by a Hyundai Lambda engine, retaining the stock engine block and heads. Beginning as a naturally-aspirated 3.8 litres (232 cu in), the engine's displacement was increased to 4.1 litres (250 cu in). In conjunction with a custom intake, free-flow exhaust, specialized engine management, and a Garrett turbocharger, the engine creates 900 hp (671 kW; 912 PS) and 800 lb⋅ft (1,100 N⋅m) of torque. The rear-wheel drive powertrain features a Xtrac DP386 5-speed sequential transmission, with a clutch for launch. BBS 3-piece, 18-inch aluminum wheels and Hankook F200 racing slicks included. The engine bay was lined in gold foil, in an effort to reflect the immense heat away from critical parts.
