= Rhys Millen =

New Zealand racing driver

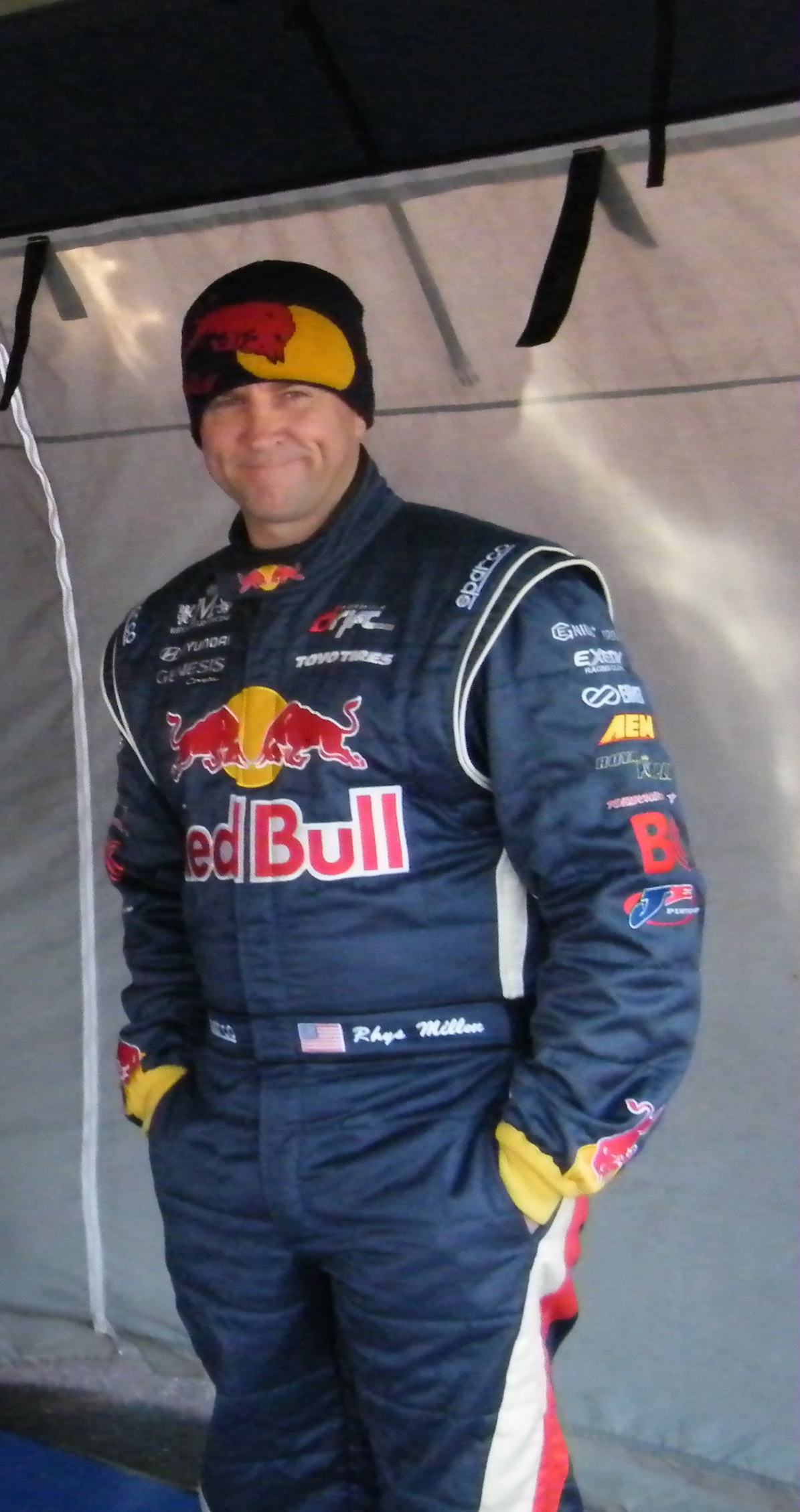
- Millen at NJMP, 2010
- Nationality: New Zealand
- Born: Rhys Rodney Millen; 6 September 1972 (age 54) New Zealand
- Relatives: Rod Millen (father); Steve Millen (uncle); Ryan Millen (brother)

Global Rallycross career
- Debut season: 2011
- Current team: Rhys Millen Racing
- Car number: 67
- Starts: 31
- Wins: 2
- Podiums: 2
- Best finish: 3rd in 2011
- Finished last season: 10th (2014)

Previous series
- Formula D

Rhys Rodney Millen (born 6 September 1972) is a New Zealand-born racing driver.

Nephew of IMSA GTS driver Steve Millen, son of Rodney and older brother of Ryan, is one of the America's top competitors in drifting. Prior to that, he was a top rally driver in the US, and became the first works backed driver from a car manufacturer with GM in 2004 after narrowly losing to Ken Nomura in the US D1 Grand Prix exhibition event in 2003. In 2011, Millen raced a 500 bhp AWD Hyundai Veloster in the US Rallycross championship. In the following years, he competed in the Global Rallycross series.

== Career ==
Millen became just the second champion in the short history of the United States' top drifting series, Formula D, just a year after his good friend, Samuel Hubinette, became the maiden series champ. Millen has two wins in his Formula D career: the 2004 season finale at the Irwindale Speedway, and the 2005 season opener at the Wall Speedway in Wall Township, New Jersey. He became the highest placed non-Japanese driver in the US round of the D1GP event in 2005, making it to the last 8 after beating Masato Kawabata, only to lose to Yasuyuki Kazama through a "One More Time" rerun. Millen's father, Rod, also competes in drifting on occasion. In fact, Rod made his Formula D debut at the 2005 season finale at Irwindale, the same event where his son was crowned the champion.

Millen has driven a Pontiac GTO drift car for three seasons (Winning in 2004 and 2005, but losing out to Hubinette in 2006) and a Pontiac Solstice for the 2007 D1 Season. For the 2009 season, he will drive a Hyundai Genesis Coupe. Red Bull has been a major sponsor of Rhys' drifting efforts, as well as the paint schemes of many of his cars.

Besides racing, Millen is also a stunt driver for films such as The Dukes of Hazzard, Mr. & Mrs. Smith, and The Fast and the Furious: Tokyo Drift. He also did the driving for the first Hyundai Genesis Coupe commercial.

On 31 December 2008, Millen became the first person to back-flip an off-road truck in the air. He landed off-balance, forcing his vehicle to flip on its side a few times after landing, but then walked away unharmed.

In 2009, Hyundai teamed up with Millen to race the Hyundai Genesis Coupe at the Formula Drift Professional Drifting Championship, the Pikes Peak International Hill Climb and select Redline Time Attack Series events in 2009. On July of that year, Millen set a new rear wheel drive record to take Pikes Peak's time attack title.

In 2010, Millen, with navigator Antony Jay Hartley, partnered with Hyundai into the sport of rally.

== Racing record ==
| Colour | Result |
|---|---|
| Gold | Winner |
| Silver | 2nd place |
| Bronze | 3rd place |
| Green | Last 4 [Semi-final] |
| Blue | Last 8 [Quarter-final] |
| Purple | Last 16 (16) [1st Tsuiou Round OR Tandem Battle] (Numbers are given to indicate Top 10 finish) |
| Black | Disqualified (DSQ) (Given to indicate that the driver has been stripped of their position through disqualification) |
| White | First Round (TAN) [Tansou OR Qualifying Single Runs] |
| Red | Did not qualify (DNQ) |

- When driver's position are highlighted in blue, this indicates either the driver earned 100pt or 100pt tansou (solo run) bonus has been awarded, with the latter being in use for Pre-2005.

=== D1 Grand Prix ===
| Year | Entrant | Car | 1 | 2 | 3 | 4 | 5 | 6 | 7 | 8 | Position | Points |
|---|---|---|---|---|---|---|---|---|---|---|---|---|
| 2004 | Pontiac | Pontiac GTO | IRW; TSU | SGO | EBS | APS | ODB | EBS | TKB | | | 0 |
| 2005 | Pontiac | Pontiac GTO | IRW; TAN | ODB | SGO | APS | EBS | FUJ | TKB | | 12 | 25 |
| 2006 | Red Bull | Pontiac Solstice GXP | IRW | SGO | FUJ | APS | EBS | SUZ | FUJ | | 12 | 25 |
| 2009 | Red Bull | Hyundai Genesis Coupe | IRW; DNQ | | | | | | | | | 0 |

=== Formula D ===
| Year | Entrant | Car | 1 | 2 | 3 | 4 | 5 | 6 | 7 | Position | Points |
|---|---|---|---|---|---|---|---|---|---|---|---|
| 2004 | Pontiac | Pontiac GTO | Rd. 1 | Rd. 2 | Rd. 3 | Rd. 4 | | | | | |
| 2005 | Pontiac | Pontiac GTO | Rd. 1 | Rd. 2 | Rd. 3 | Rd. 4 | Rd. 5 | Rd. 6 | | 1 | |
| 2006 | Red Bull Pontiac | Pontiac GTO | Rd. 1 | Rd. 2 | Rd. 3 | Rd. 4 | Rd. 5 | Rd. 6 | Rd. 7 | 2 | 596.00 |
| 2006 | Red Bull Pontiac | Pontiac Solstice GXP | | | | | | | | 2 | 596.00 |
| 2007 | Red Bull Pontiac | Pontiac Solstice GXP | Rd. 1 | Rd. 2 | Rd. 3 | Rd. 4 | Rd. 5 | Rd. 6 | Rd. 7 | 4 | 478.00 |

=== Complete Global Rallycross Championship results ===
==== AWD ====
| Year | Entrant | Car | 1 | 2 | 3 | 4 | 5 | 6 | 7 | 8 | GRC | Points |
|---|---|---|---|---|---|---|---|---|---|---|---|---|
| 2011 | Rhys Millen | Hyundai Veloster | IRW1; 5 | IRW2; 4 | OLD1; 7 | OLD2; 5 | PIK1; 9 | PIK2; 4 | LA1; 14 | LA2; 6 | 3rd | 82 |

==== Supercar ====
| Year | Entrant | Car | 1 | 2 | 3 | 4 | 5 | 6 | 7 | 8 | 9 | 10 | 11 | 12 | GRC | Points |
|---|---|---|---|---|---|---|---|---|---|---|---|---|---|---|---|---|
| 2012 | Hyundai Rallycross Rhys Millen Racing | Hyundai Veloster | CHA; 6 | TEX; 4 | LA; 4 | NH | LVS; 6 | LVC; 3 | | | | | | | 4th | 63 |
| 2013 | Rhys Millen Racing | Hyundai Veloster | BRA | MUN1 | MUN2 | LOU | BRI | LAN; 4 | ATL | CHA | LVS; 10 | | | | 18th | 20 |
| 2014 | Rhys Millen Racing | Hyundai Veloster | BAR; 7 | AUS; 13 | DC; 9 | NY; 7 | CHA; 11 | DAY; 1 | LA1; 4 | LA2; 1 | SEA; 5 | LV; 13 | | | 10th | 201 |
| 2015 | Rhys Millen Racing | Hyundai Veloster | FTA | DAY1 | DAY2 | MCAS | DET1 | DET2 | DC | LA1 | LA2 | BAR1; DNS | BAR2; 11 | LV | NC | 0 |
| 2016 | Rhys Millen Racing | Hyundai Veloster | PHO1; 8 | PHO2; 9 | DAL; 8 | DAY1; 6 | DAY2; 9 | MCAS1 | MCAS2^{†} | DC | AC | SEA | LA1 | LA2 | 10th | 96 |

^{†}Race cancelled.

== See also ==
- Hyundai PM580

| Preceded by Samuel Hübinette | Formula D Champion; 2005 | Succeeded by Samuel Hübinette |
