= Top Gear (American TV series) =

American motoring television series 2010–2016

- Top Gear title card from season 2
- Genre: Motoring
- Based on: Top Gear by Jeremy Clarkson; Andy Wilman
- Directed by: Benjamin Fitzgerald McBryderson; Vage Dickinson
- Presented by: Adam Ferrara; Tanner Foust; Rutledge Wood; The Stig
- Country of origin: United States
- Original language: English
- No. of seasons: 6
- No. of episodes: 72 (list of episodes)

Production
- Production locations: Former MCAS El Toro, Irvine, California, USA
- Running time: approx. 40–45 minutes
- Production companies: BBC Worldwide; Reveille Productions (2011–12)

Original release
- Network: History
- Release: November 21, 2010 – June 28, 2016

Related
- Top Gear worldwide

Top Gear is an American motoring television series, based on the BBC series of the same name. The show's presenters were professional racing driver Tanner Foust, actor and comedian Adam Ferrara, and automotive and racing analyst Rutledge Wood. As with the original British version, the show has its own version of The Stig, an anonymous racing driver, and a celebrity guest is featured each week for the first two seasons. The show originally ran from 2010 to 2016 on History.

== Format ==
The show's first two seasons follow a similar format of the BBC version: three main hosts present, The Stig (an anonymous race driver) tests vehicles, and celebrities are invited for interviews and to drive vehicles around a test track. In addition, challenges similar in nature to the ones presented in the original show are replicated in Top Gear. The "Star in a Reasonably Priced Car" (retitled "Big Star, Small Car") segment uses a Suzuki SX4 Sportback. Filming of this segment, along with in-studio segments take place at the former Marine Corps Air Station El Toro, now known as the Orange County Great Park, in Irvine, California.

Beginning in season 3, the show changed its emphasis to the hosts' stunts involving car customization, with all studio-based segments, as well as car reviews and Power Laps, discarded from the series.

== Segments ==
=== Power Laps ===
The first two seasons feature a Power Laps segment in which The Stig completes a lap around the track in a reviewed car to compare its performance to previous contenders.

All laps are timed with the car's manufacturer-provided adjustable settings configured for maximum performance — all adjustable suspensions are set at their most efficient, all gear shift maps are at their most aggressive, and driving aids such as traction control are deactivated.

==== Power Lap times ====
1. 1:18.6 – Ariel Atom
2. 1:19.5 – Tanner Foust's Ford Fiesta Rallycross
3. 1:22.0 – Dodge Viper SRT 10 ACR
4. 1:22.4 – Chevrolet Corvette C6 ZR1
5. 1:22.6 – Lexus LFA
6. 1:22.8 – Lamborghini Gallardo LP 570-4 Superleggera
7. 1:23.3 – Ferrari 458 Italia
8. 1:23.4 – Lamborghini Murciélago LP 670-4 SuperVeloce
9. 1:25.3 – Porsche Panamera Turbo
10. 1:26.9 – Lamborghini Gallardo LP 550-2 Balboni
11. 1:27.2 – Cadillac CTS-V Sport Wagon
12. 1:27.4 – Cadillac CTS-V Coupe
13. 1:27.6 – Mercedes-Benz SLS AMG
14. 1:28.2 – Aston Martin V12 Vantage
15. 1:28.2 – Ford Mustang 302 Boss
16. 1:28.4 – Lotus Evora
17. 1:28.5 – Ferrari California
18. 1:28.8 – Audi RS6
19. 1:28.9 – Ford Mustang Roush
20. 1:29.2 – Mitsubishi Lancer Evolution X GSR
21. 1:30.0 – Subaru Impreza WRX STI
22. 1:30.0 – BMW X6 M
23. 1:39.0 – Hennessey F-150 VelociRaptor 600
24. 5:22.0 – Lamborghini R 485

=== Big Star, Small Car ===
Big Star, Small Car, another recurring segment in the first two seasons, was inspired by the "Star in reasonably priced car" segments on the original Top Gear. During each episode, a celebrity is interviewed by one of the three presenters. Discussion is normally amusing, and focuses on car-related matters, such as the celebrity's car history. Then the presenter and the studio audience watch the guest's fastest lap on the Top Gear test track.

The car used for this segment is a Suzuki SX4 Sportback. Each guest practices with The Stig before making several attempts to complete the test track in the fastest time. The guest does not learn their time until the interview. Practice laps, crashes and the drivers' facial expressions are also shown during the segment.

==== Star Lap times ====
Note: (wet) means the track was wet when the lap was taken.

1. 1:39.3 – Stephen Moyer
2. 1:41.8 – Patrick Warburton
3. 1:42.4 – Arlene Tur
4. 1:43.2 – Tony Hawk
5. 1:43.9 – Kid Rock (wet)
6. 1:44.0 – Tim Allen
7. 1:44.3 – Jon Huertas
8. 1:44.3 – Bill Engvall
9. 1:44.4 – Bret Michaels
10. 1:45.3 – Dominic Monaghan
11. 1:46.6 – Ty Burrell (wet)
12. 1:46.7 – Edward Burns
13. 1:48.1 – Rick Harrison
14. 1:49.2 – Adam Levine
15. 1:49.9 – Kal Penn
16. 1:51.1 – Joe Mantegna
17. 1:51.5 – Austin "Chumlee" Russell
18. 1:55.2 – Steve Schirripa
19. 1:55.2 – Michelle Rodriguez (wet)
20. 1:55.4 – Lake Bell
21. 1:55.6 – Buzz Aldrin
22. 2:06.9 – Bridget Marquardt

== Episodes ==
Season	Episodes	Originally released	
Season	Episodes	First released	Last released
1	10	November 21, 2010	January 23, 2011
2	16	July 24, 2011	April 3, 2012
3	16	August 14, 2012	April 2, 2013
4	10	September 3, 2013	November 26, 2013
5	10	June 3, 2014	October 21, 2014
6	10	April 26, 2016	June 28, 2016

== History ==
=== Top Gear on Discovery Channel ===
In 2005, Discovery Channel made a pilot for an American version of the show featuring actor and IHRA driver Bruno Massel, actor John Jenkinson, and actor John Littlefield as the hosts. The attempt was not picked up by the Discovery Channel. The pilot featured Iron Man director Jon Favreau as the Star in a Reasonably Priced Car, a race between Littlefield's 2005 Ford Mustang and Jenkinson's 2005 Dodge Charger R/T, and a review of the Lexus RX 400h. After the pilot proved to be unsuccessful, the Discovery Channel later began airing a slightly "Americanized" version of the British Top Gear show with presenters Jeremy Clarkson, Richard Hammond, and James May. This show featured clips of features and challenges from Series 1–5 from the BBC Two show with introduction segments recorded by Clarkson, Hammond and May at the Dunsfold Aerodrome studio especially for the US audience. Regular features like "The News" and "Star in a Reasonably Priced Car" were not shown on the Discovery Channel version.

=== Top Gear on NBC ===
In April 2007, the BBC was still looking to launch a locally produced version of Top Gear in the United States. NBC announced, in January 2008, that it had ordered a pilot for an American version of the show, retitled Gear. BBC Worldwide had been contracted to produce the pilot for NBC. According to NBC reality chief Craig Plestis, many automakers had shown interest in America's version of Top Gear.

On June 16, 2008, NBC and the BBC officially announced an American version of Top Gear, to be hosted by Adam Carolla, Tanner Foust and Eric Stromer. The studio segments for the pilot were taped on July 26, 2008 to generally favorable reviews citing close following of the UK version's format. NBC was expected to have Top Gear premiere as a midseason replacement in 2009.

Jay Leno, who originally turned down offers to host the show, expressed concern in 2008 over whether or not a show like Top Gear could be successful in America. In a column published by The Sunday Times in 2008, Leno expressed concern that an American version could lack the critical reviews for which the British version is known. The British show is produced for the BBC with public funds while the American show airs on commercial television. Leno believes that the show may have to worry about offending current and potential sponsors by giving their products poor reviews, leading to a compromise in the journalistic integrity and freedom of the original show.

On December 11, 2008, NBC reversed its decision to place the show as a midseason replacement, citing concerns about the potential success of a car-themed show in light of the failure of Knight Rider. NBC allowed the BBC to shop it around to cable networks to possibly pick it up. In February 2009, Jeremy Clarkson stated that the American version had been "canned", claiming that focus groups "... just don't understand a single word we're on about. They just don't get it really."

=== Top Gear on History ===
On August 6, 2010, the first Top Gear trailer was published on the web, giving fans a preview on what to expect on the upcoming episodes to be broadcast on the History Channel. In this trailer, new hosts Adam Ferrara, Tanner Foust, and Rutledge Wood were seen participating in a Moonshine Challenge and Tanner Foust also takes a Dodge Viper for a test drive. The first season premiered on November 21, 2010, and as of 2014, the series has been renewed for its fifth season. Commenting on the second season renewal, British host Jeremy Clarkson noted, "Top Gear is our baby so you can understand why Hammond, May and I were anxious about passing it on to the presenters of the American show. We needn’t have worried because Top Gear is clearly in safe hands, even if they do insist on speaking in those stupid accents. Watching an episode from series 1 with Richard and James, we found ourselves in a genuinely heated debate about which of the presenters’ cars was best. We were just three ordinary chaps watching a car show and loving it, which is exactly what Top Gear should be. Bring on series 2."

In a Facebook post on June 26, 2016, Wood stated his belief that the episode set to air the same week would be the last for the series on History.

== Broadcast ==
Top Gear premiered in the United States on History on November 21, 2010. On February 10, 2011, the show was renewed for a second season to premiere on November the same year. On May 11, 2012, History renewed Top Gear for a 16 episode third season, which premiered August 14, 2012. The second half of the season premiered January 29, 2013. It was renewed for a fourth season, which started filming April 30, 2013, and premiered on September 3, 2013. The fifth season premiered on June 3, 2014. Its most recent season, Season 6, began airing on April 26, 2016. On June 28, 2016, the BBC confirmed that the series had completed its contractual run on the History channel."

In the United Kingdom, the first and second seasons are broadcast on BBC Three. The first season premiered on October 14, 2011, and the second season premiered on January 13, 2012. The second season halted broadcasting on January 27 but continued its run on June 29, 2012. It is broadcast under the name Top Gear USA to avoid confusion with the original British version.

The first season premiered on GO! in Australia on November 26, 2011, whilst season two onward aired on BBC Knowledge, a channel on Australian Pay TV service Foxtel. In Canada, it airs on BBC Canada.

In Mexico and Latin America the show broadcasts on History Channel Latino.

== Reception ==
Before the show started, there was a mixed response to Top Gear being remade for an American audience. Stuart Heritage of The Guardian noted the brutal response to the first trailer of the History Channel version of the show on the Internet, with YouTube users noting History's version to be an "'insult to the actual Top Gear" among other less favorable comments. Agreeing with the commenters, Heritage notes that US television doesn't have "Jeremy Clarkson, Captain Slow and The Hamster," but noting the original BBC version isn't exactly "British" per se, and figured the show could possibly translate easily if done right.

Top Gear premiered at 1.9 million viewers in its first episode, which dropped to 1.3 million viewers after the first episode. The second-season premiere had a viewership of 2 million viewers. Metacritic collected an aggregated score of 72 for season one.

The show has received mixed reviews from numerous critics. Tim Goodman of The Hollywood Reporter judged the show as a whole, noting, "It's a promising beginning for a show most thought would end up in a ditch." Goodman noted the shaky history of the show being brought over to the United States (including Jay Leno's take on the Star in a Reasonably Priced Car segment for his short-lived show) and the venom of online comments, to which Goodman replies: "Everyone gets it." Mike Hale of the New York Times had mixed reactions to the show, going from how History's version almost slavishly follows the formula the BBC version uses ("that any subject or concept can appeal to a wide audience if you find the right balance of competition and destruction (the childlike smashing of large objects) with humor, sentiment and pretty locations.") to how the show has gaps between the BBC and History Channel version. Hale had concerns the show was not translating well, as the History version lacks the "going out of the lines" aspect of the original, and the host lineup for History's version being younger and more callow than the BBC version's hosts.

John Krewson of Gawker Media, writing for Jalopnik, encouraged readers to watch the show. Watching the first three episodes of season one, he noted the first episode would be "little strange for most viewers." but towards the third episode, viewers should "have the snack tray full and an hour free," and praising the show despite its initial roughness. Chris Shunk, writing for Autoblog, was impressed with the first show, but warned readers to not compare History's version of Top Gear to the BBC version of Top Gear so easily. Also, the show would encourage Autoblog to "keep watching... at least for nine more weeks." Lee Pray of Edmunds Inside Line noted the show seems worthwhile, but while it won't match up the original BBC version, it was worth to have two versions of Top Gear around. The A.V. Club gave the show an overall rating of C, lamenting that Season One of the series ended with a clip show, and not liking host Adam Ferrara. The review compared both the BBC and History Channel versions, and claimed that History's version borrowed "the graphics, music, and editing...." of the original, but that the show felt like it was "imported from a 1980s beer commercial."

== DVD release ==
Season	Release date
Season 1	July 19, 2011
Season 2	February 19, 2013
Season 3	August 6, 2013
Season 4	December 9, 2014
Season 5	August 30, 2016
Season 6	Never released to DVD
