= Rutledge Wood =

American sports announcer (born 1980)

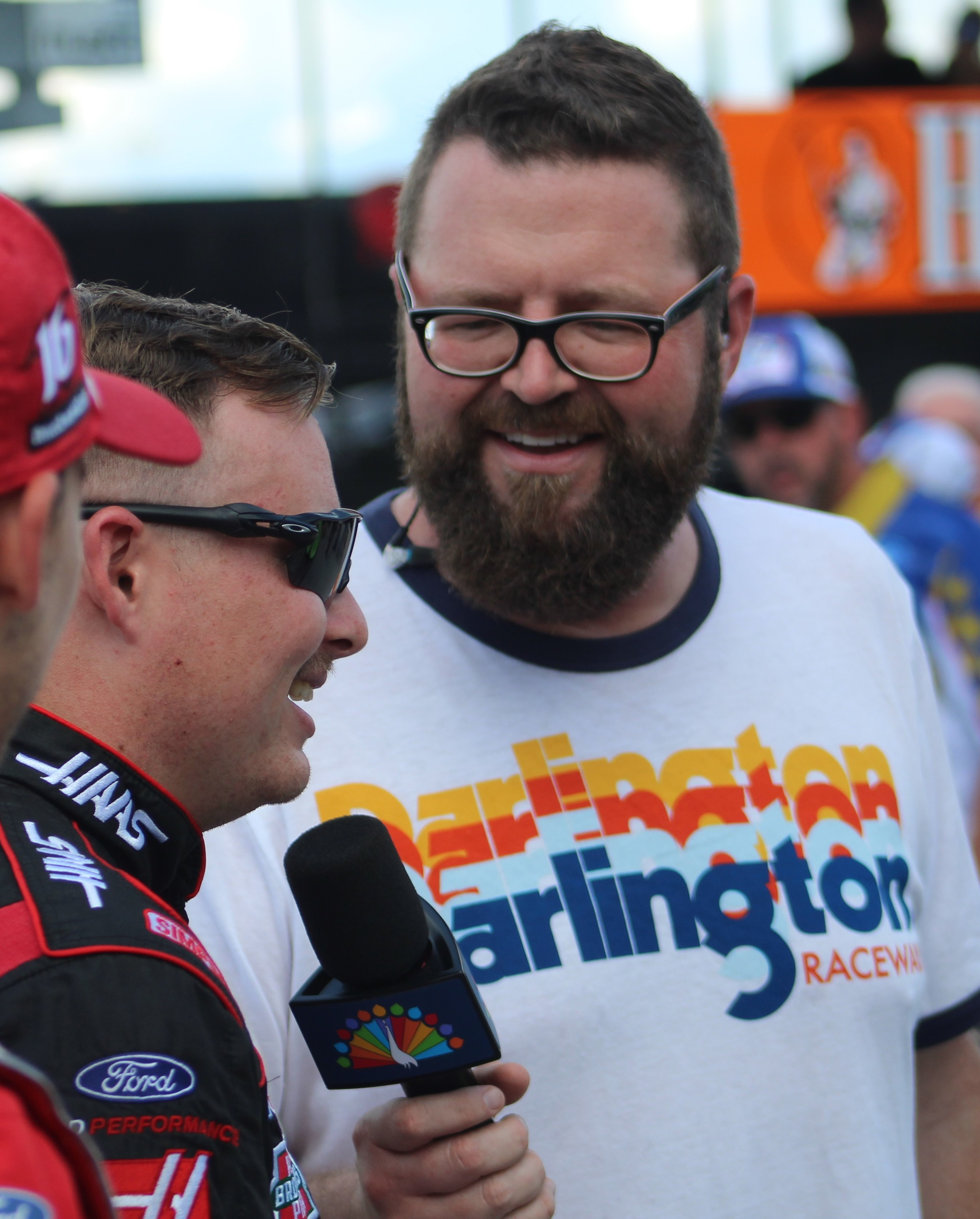
- Wood interviewing Cole Custer at Darlington Raceway in 2018
- Born: April 22, 1980 (age 46); Birmingham, Alabama, U.S.
- Occupations: Auto racing analyst; TV show host
- Known for: Co-hosting Top Gear; Hosting Floor Is Lava

Rutledge Wood (born April 22, 1980) is an American auto racing analyst and TV show host. Wood was one of three hosts for History's Top Gear along with Adam Ferrara and Tanner Foust, which premiered on November 21, 2010. Until 2013, he was one of the hosts for NASCAR Trackside. He was also the host of the Speed Road Tour Challenge in 2007. In 2013, Wood won the 2013 Long Beach Toyota Celebrity Race with Adam Carolla winning in the Pro Category who Wood says taught him the course. Rutledge is known for wearing thick horn rim glasses.

In summer 2014, he started shooting the fifth season of Top Gear. In May 2015, a new show called Lost in Transmission appeared with him as the host which focuses on him driving around his hometown in Georgia along with a friend of his fixing up old classic cars.

He is also the host of the Netflix shows Hyperdrive, Floor Is Lava, and The American Barbecue Showdown, which launched in August 2019, June 2020, and September 2020 respectively.

He is hosting a new NBC competition series Hot Wheels: Ultimate Challenge, which launched in May 2023.

Wood is a 2002 graduate of the University of Georgia.
