= Tanner Foust =

American racecar driver, stunt driver and television host

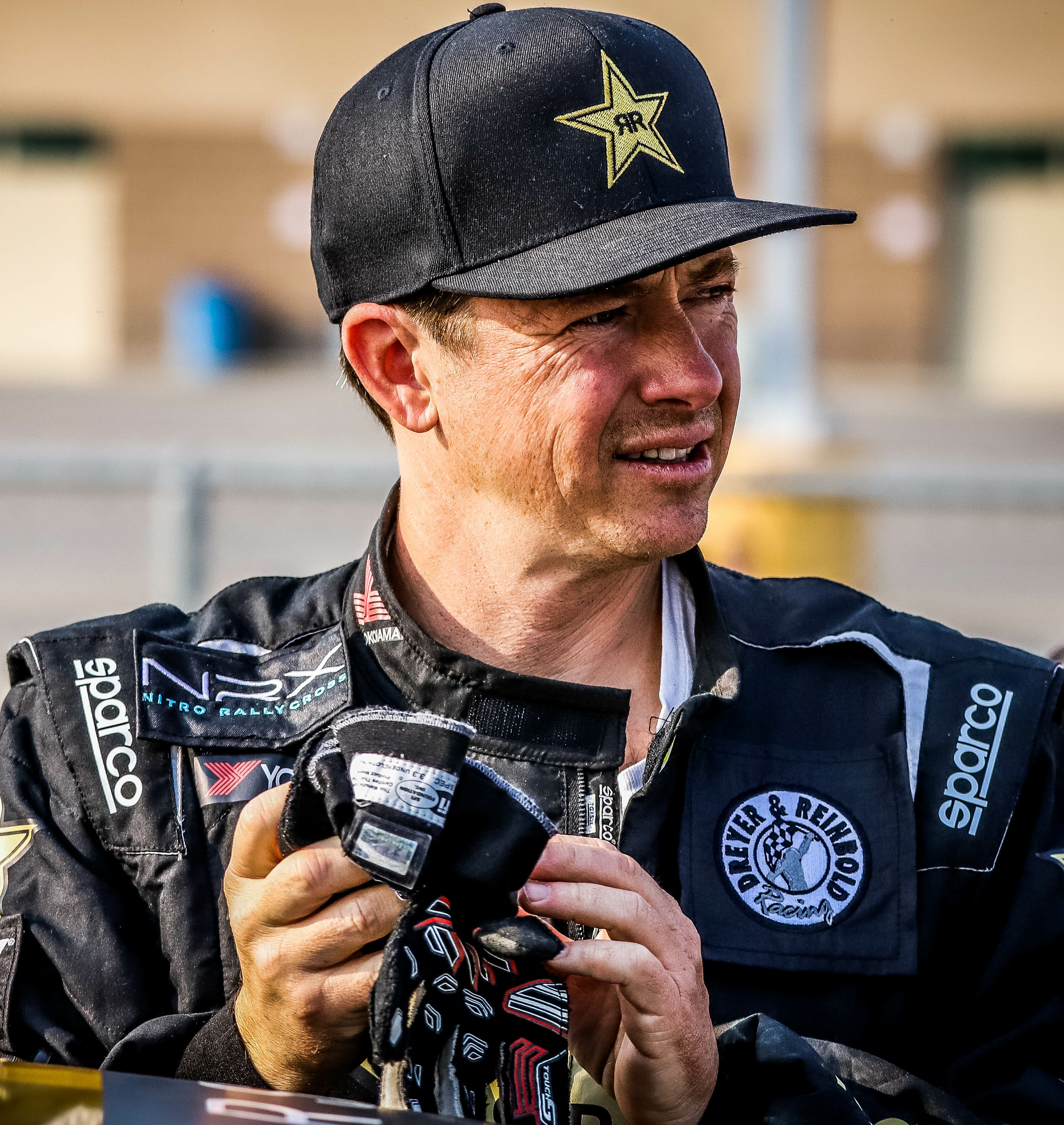
- Foust at the 2021 Utah Nitro RX round
- Born: Tanner Lee Foust; June 13, 1973 (age 53); Denver, Colorado, U.S.
- Education: Degree in molecular biology from University of Colorado
- Occupations: TV Show Host; Stunt Car Driver; Professional Drift Car Driver; Professional Rallycross Driver
- Known for: Rallycross and drift racing Top Gear co-host Formula D Drift Champion (2007, 2008); X Games gold medallist: Rally Car Racing (2007, 2010); Rally Car Super Rally (2010); Gymkhana Grid (2013); Television and film Film Stunt Driver; SPEED's SuperCars Exposed host SPEED's Redline TV host ESPN's Import Tuners host History Channel's Top Gear host
- Height: 5 ft 10 in (1.78 m)

Global Rallycross career
- Debut season: 2011
- Current team: Volkswagen Andretti Rallycross
- Car number: 34
- Former teams: Olsbergs MSE
- Starts: 68
- Championships: 2 (2011, 2012)
- Wins: 17
- Podiums: 35
- Finished last season: 2nd

FIA World Rallycross Championship
- Years active: 2014–2016
- Former teams: Volkswagen RX Sweden; Marklund Motorsport
- Starts: 9
- Championships: 0
- Wins: 1
- Podiums: 2
- Best finish: 13th in 2014

FIA ERX Supercar Championship
- Years active: 2011–2014
- Former teams: Marklund Motorsport; Olsbergs MSE; Rockstar Energy Rallycross Team
- Starts: 21
- Wins: 6
- Podiums: 12
- Best finish: 2nd in 2011

Championship titles
- 2007-2008 2011–2012 2019: Formula D Global Rallycross; Americas Rallycross Championship
Medal record
X Games
Representing United States
| Gold medal – first place | 2007 Los Angeles | Rally |
| Gold medal – first place | 2010 Los Angeles | Rally |
| Gold medal – first place | 2010 Los Angeles | Super Rally |
| Silver medal – second place | 2008 Los Angeles | Rally |
| Silver medal – second place | 2011 Los Angeles | Rallycross |
| Bronze medal – third place | 2009 Los Angeles | Rally |
| Bronze medal – third place | 2013 Munich | Rallycross |
| Silver medal – second place | 2013 Los Angeles | Rallycross |
| Gold medal – first place | 2013 Los Angeles | Gymkhana |
Nitro World Games
Representing United States
| Bronze medal – third place | 2018 Erda | Nitro Rallycross |
- Website: http://tannerfoust.com/

Tanner Lee Foust (born June 13, 1973) is an American professional racing driver, stunt driver, and television host. He competes in rally, drift, ice racing, time attack, hill climb and rallycross with multiple podium placements, national championships, and world records. He was a co-host of the American version of the motoring television series Top Gear USA.

== Background ==
Growing up in a naval family, Foust spent several years as a child in Scotland, where he discovered rallying and learned to drive on the country roads near his home. He returned to the United States and worked jobs as a golf caddy and school bus driver, from which he was fired, and went into a pre-med track at the University of Colorado, earning a biology degree. He spent his summers at the track, trading mechanic work and driver coaching jobs for seat time in racecars. After college, he began working as an ice driving coach, an instructor at automotive marketing events and competing in anything he could, including rally and drifting. He made the transition to professional racing in 2003, and soon moved to California to begin stunt driving for Hollywood films. With his passion for cars, he has rapidly become one of the busiest professional drivers in the United States. He considers himself fortunate that, in just over ten years of professional racing, he has had the opportunity to compete against the likes of Rod Millen, Colin McRae, Michael Schumacher, Jenson Button and Sebastian Vettel.

== Career ==
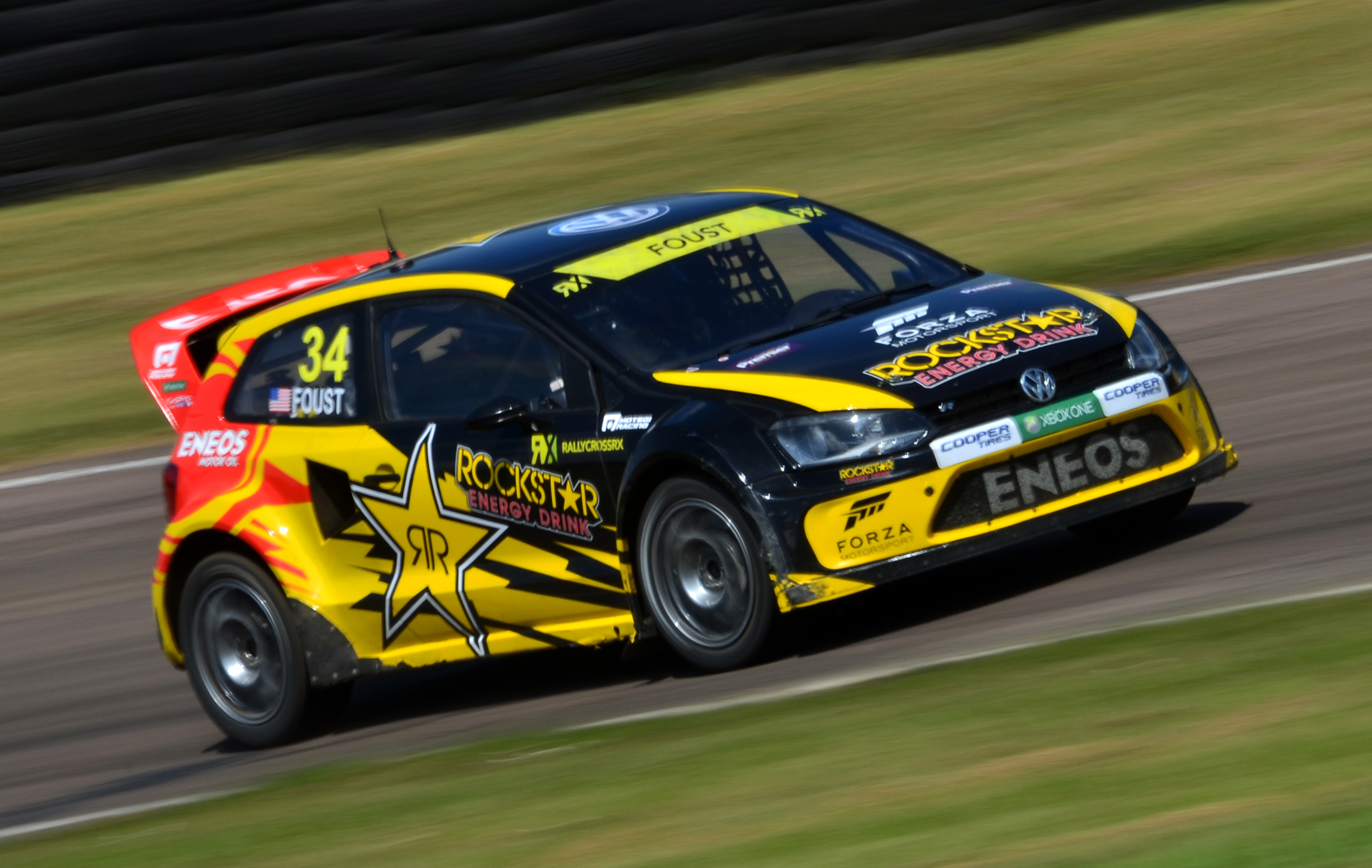
Foust in action during the 2014 World RX of Great Britain. Later that same year he won the World RX of Finland.

Foust was slated to become co-host for the original American version of the motoring television series, Top Gear, on NBC and filmed a pilot before the series was dropped. The series has since been picked up by the History Channel and Foust was the only pilot presenter to be picked up when the program finally made it on air in the U.S. in late 2010. He has also hosted other shows including SPEED Channel's SuperCars Exposed, SPEED Channel's Redline TV and ESPN's Import Tuners. On November 21, 2010, he made his debut for the History Channel series, Top Gear, the American version of the BBC hit series of the same name.

Foust has been a stunt driver for films such as The Fast and the Furious Tokyo Drift, Ford vs Ferrari, Need For Speed and The Dukes of Hazzard and set multiple world records with Hot Wheels and Top Gear. He was a prominent competitor in the Formula Drift series, winning the 2007 and 2008 championship. Foust is the first driver in Formula Drift history to win back-to-back series championships. He is the most decorated driver in X Games history with nine medals. Foust first competed in X Games XIII in 2007 where he won the gold in the rally racing event. He also participated in Rally America in 2009. In 2010 at X Games XVI, he won gold in Rally Car Racing and Rally Car Super Rally, driving the Rockstar Energy Ford Fiesta. He also competed in the European Rallycross Championship, becoming the first American to do so. After leaving the drifting scene in favor of RallyCross in 2011, Foust became a regular ERC competitor, taking part in nine of the ten rounds of the FIA recognized series finished second overall as well as Global RallyCross - winning the championship. In 2012, Foust continued his success with another Global RallyCross championship.

For 2013, Foust medaled in both racing events at X Games XIX Los Angeles with a gold in Gymkhana Grid and silver in RallyCross. These marked his eighth and ninth X Games medals.

In the summer of 2015, Foust started shooting the sixth and final season of Top Gear completing 72 episodes.

At the Chicago Auto Show in February 2014, Foust announced a new partnership with Volkswagen and Andretti Autosport. He drove a Volkswagen New Beetle for the 2014 Global RallyCross Championship season as well as selected events with Marklund Motorsport in the inaugural season of the FIA World Rallycross Championship. He became the first, and so far only, driver from outside Europe to win a round of the championship, winning the 2014 World RX of Finland. As the US rallycross series has changed its name from Global Rallycross to America’s Rallycross and Nitro Rallycross, Foust has finished runner up in the championship 3 times and won the NRX championship in 2019. He holds the longest running streak of Heat victories in rallycross worldwide at 25 and is currently the winningest driver in the US.

Foust signed with McLaren XE to race in the 2022 Extreme E season alongside Emma Gilmour. He and Gilmour won McLaren's first Extreme E podium by finishing second in the Energy X-Prix. The pair were retained for the 2023 season. McLaren won its second podium by finishing second in Round 4 at the Hydro X-Prix. McLaren withdrew from Round 8 at the Island X-Prix II due to the car being badly damaged in Round 7's redemption race. In December 2023, McLaren announced that Foust and Gilmour will leave the team after two season.

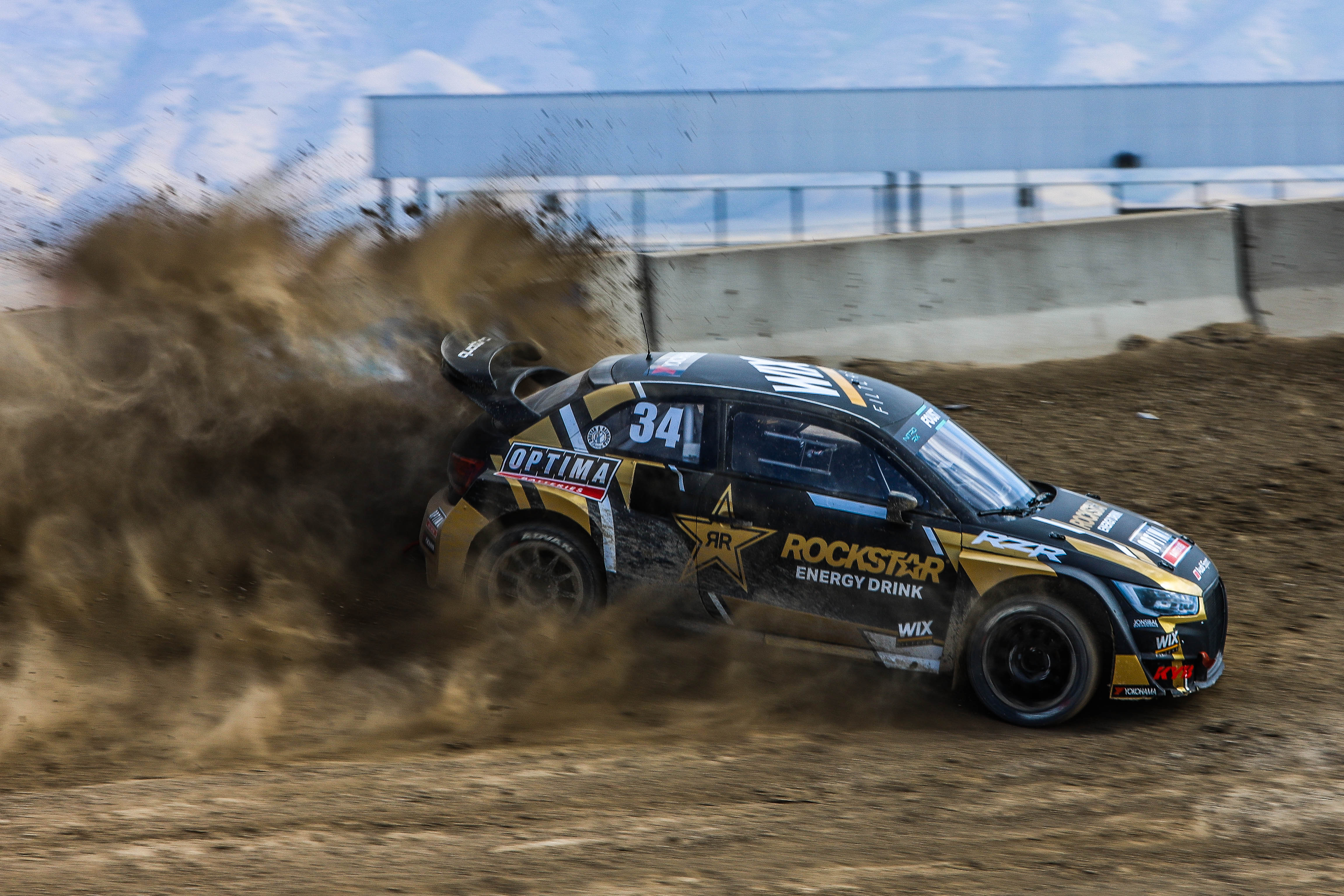
Foust driving for Dreyer & Reinbold Racing in the 2021 Nitro Rallycross Championship

== Achievements ==
Rally America

- 2005 Rally America - PGT Champion (Subaru WRX)
- 2006 Rally America - PGT Class Championship Second place overall (Subaru WRX)
- 2007 Rally America - Fourth Place (with 6 podium placements)

X Games

- 2006 X Games - Rally Third fastest time in the Stadium Super Special
- 2007 X Games - Rally Gold Medalist (Subaru STI)
- 2008 X Games - Rally Silver Medalist (Subaru STI)
- 2009 X Games - Rally Bronze Medalist (Ford Fiesta)
- 2010 X Games - Super Rally Gold Medalist (Ford Fiesta)
- 2010 X Games - Rally Gold Medalist (Ford Fiesta)
- 2011 X Games - RallyCross Silver Medal (Ford Fiesta)
- 2013 X Games Munich - RallyCross Bronze Medalist Ford Fiesta)
- 2013 X Games Los Angeles - Gymkhana Grid Gold Medalist (Ford Fiesta)
- 2013 X Games Los Angeles - RallyCross Silver Medalist (Ford Fiesta)

Rallycross championships

- 2011 European Rallycross Championship - Silver Medalist (Ford Fiesta)
- 2011 Global RallyCross Championship - Champion (Ford Fiesta)
- 2012 Global RallyCross Championship - Champion (Ford Fiesta)
- 2018 Americas Rallycross Championship - Silver Medalist (Volkswagen Beetle)
- 2019 Americas Rallycross Championship - Champion (Volkswagen Beetle)

Formula D

- 2006 Formula Drift - 3rd place overall (Nissan Silvia)
- 2007 Formula Drift - Champion (Nissan 350Z)
- 2008 Formula Drift - Champion (Nissan 350Z)
- 2009 Formula Drift - 6th Place (Scion TC)
- 2010 Formula Drift - Silver Medalist (Scion TC)

Other

- 2009 Race of Champions - Nations Cup semi-finalist
- 2010 Gymkhana Grid Gold Medalist AWD Division (Ford Fiesta)
- 2011 World record for longest jump in a four-wheeled vehicle (332 feet)
- 2011 World indoor speed record (until February 2013)
- 2012 World record for largest loop-the-loop in a car (60 feet in diameter)

== Racing record ==
=== Complete FIA European Rallycross Championship results ===
(key)

==== Division 1 ====
| Year | Entrant | Car | 1 | 2 | 3 | 4 | 5 | 6 | 7 | 8 | 9 | 10 | ERX | Points |
|---|---|---|---|---|---|---|---|---|---|---|---|---|---|---|
| 2010 | Rockstar Energy Rallycross Team | Ford Fiesta | POR; 8 | FRA | GBR; 6 | HUN | SWE; 6 | FIN | BEL | GER; 0 | POL | CZE; 8 | 11th | 40 |

==== Supercar ====
| Year | Entrant | Car | 1 | 2 | 3 | 4 | 5 | 6 | 7 | 8 | 9 | 10 | ERX | Points |
|---|---|---|---|---|---|---|---|---|---|---|---|---|---|---|
| 2011 | Rockstar Energy Rallycross Team | Ford Fiesta | GBR; 8 | POR; 1 | FRA; 6 | NOR; 6 | SWE; 1 | BEL; 8 | NED; NC (Note: Excluded by the Stewards of the Meeting, but exclusion was later quashed by FIAs International Court of Appeal) | AUT; 3 | POL; 3 | CZE; 3 | 2nd | 116 |
| 2012 | Olsbergs MSE | Ford Fiesta | GBR; 1 | FRA; 13 | AUT | HUN; 2 | NOR; 1 | SWE | BEL; 2 | NED; 6 | FIN; 6 | GER | 3rd | 100 |
| 2013 | Olsbergs MSE | Ford Fiesta ST | GBR; 1 | POR | HUN | FIN; 1 | NOR | SWE | FRA; 6 | AUT | GER | | 9th | 68 |
| 2014 | Marklund Motorsport | Volkswagen Polo | GBR; 3 | NOR | BEL | GER | ITA | | | | | | 18th | 14 |

=== Complete FIA World Rallycross Championship results ===
(key)

==== Supercar ====
| Year | Entrant | Car | 1 | 2 | 3 | 4 | 5 | 6 | 7 | 8 | 9 | 10 | 11 | 12 | 13 | WRX | Points |
|---|---|---|---|---|---|---|---|---|---|---|---|---|---|---|---|---|---|
| 2014 | Marklund Motorsport | Volkswagen Polo | POR | GBR; 5 | NOR | FIN; 1 | SWE | BEL | CAN; NC | FRA | GER | ITA | TUR; DNP | ARG | | 13th | 42 |
| 2015 | Marklund Motorsport | Volkswagen Polo | POR | HOC; 9 | BEL | GBR; 16 | GER | SWE | CAN; 3 | NOR | FRA | BAR; 5 | TUR | ITA | ARG | 15th | 44 |
| 2016 | Volkswagen RX Sweden | Volkswagen Polo | POR | HOC | BEL | GBR; 22 | NOR | SWE | CAN | FRA | BAR | LAT | GER; 18 | ARG | | 29th | 0 |

=== Complete Global RallyCross Championship results ===
(key)

==== AWD ====
| Year | Entrant | Car | 1 | 2 | 3 | 4 | 5 | 6 | 7 | 8 | GRC | Points |
|---|---|---|---|---|---|---|---|---|---|---|---|---|
| 2011 | Olsbergs MSE Ford Racing | Ford Fiesta | IRW1; 3 | IRW2; 2 | SEA1; 2 | SEA2; 1 | PIK1; 1 | PIK2; 6 | LA1; 4 | LA2; 2 | 1st | 134 |

==== Supercar ====
| Year | Entrant | Car | 1 | 2 | 3 | 4 | 5 | 6 | 7 | 8 | 9 | 10 | 11 | 12 | GRC | Points |
|---|---|---|---|---|---|---|---|---|---|---|---|---|---|---|---|---|
| 2012 | Olsbergs MSE Ford Racing | Ford Fiesta | CHA; 2 | TEX; 2 | LA; 5 | LOU; 4 | LV; 1 | LVC; 1 | | | | | | | 1st | 94 |
| 2013 | Olsbergs MSE | Ford Fiesta ST | BRA; 8 | MUN1; 6 | MUN2; 3 | LOU; 4 | BRI; 7 | IRW; 2 | ATL; 2 | CHA; 10 | LV; 2 | | | | 2nd | 123 |
| 2014 | Volkswagen Andretti Rallycross | Volkswagen Polo | BAR; 11 | AUS; 18 | DC; 5 | NY; 1 | CHA; 8 | DAY; 6 | | | | | | | 9th | 209 |
| 2014 | Volkswagen Andretti Rallycross | Volkswagen Beetle | | | | | | | LA1; 8 | LA2; 13 | SEA; 10 | LV; 6 | | | 9th | 209 |
| 2015 | Volkswagen Andretti Rallycross | Volkswagen Beetle | FTA; 5 | DAY1; 1 | DAY2; 5 | MCAS; 12 | DET1; 10 | DET2; 10 | DC; 5 | LA1; 2 | LA2; 3 | BAR1; 1 | BAR2; 1 | LV; 9 | 3rd | 388 |
| 2016 | Volkswagen Andretti Rallycross | Volkswagen Beetle | PHO1; 1 | PHO2; 1 | DAL; 3 | DAY1; 5 | DAY2; 1 | MCAS1; 8 | MCAS2; C | DC; 3 | AC; 4 | SEA; 1 | LA1; 2 | LA2; 4 | 2nd | 565 |
| 2017 | Volkswagen Andretti Rallycross | Volkswagen Beetle | MEM; 2 | LOU; 4 | THO1; 1 | THO2; 9 | OTT1; 2 | OTT2; 1 | INDY; 2 | AC1; 10 | AC2; 9 | SEA1; 1 | SEA2; 1 | LA; 1 | 2nd | 807 |

=== Complete Americas Rallycross Championship results ===
| Year | Entrant | Car | 1 | 2 | 3 | 4 | 5 | 6 | Rank | Points |
|---|---|---|---|---|---|---|---|---|---|---|
| 2018 | Volkswagen Andretti Rallycross | Volkswagen Beetle | SIL; 1 | AUS1; 3 | TRO; 2 | AUS2; 1 | | | 2nd | 107 |
| 2019 | Volkswagen Andretti Rallycross | Volkswagen Beetle | MO1; 4 | GTW1; 6 | GTW2; 3 | TRO; 1 | AUS; 1 | MO2; 7 | 1st | 143 |

=== Complete Nitrocross results ===
| Year | Entrant | Car | 1 | 2 | 3 | 4 | 5 | 6 | 7 | 8 | 9 | 10 | NRX | Points |
|---|---|---|---|---|---|---|---|---|---|---|---|---|---|---|
| 2021 | Dreyer & Reinbold Racing | Audi S1 | UTA; 7 | ERX; 7 | WHP; 6 | GHR; 13 | FIRM; 6 | | | | | | 6th | 82 |
| 2023-24 | Xite Energy Racing | FC1-X | MID | UMC1; 9 | UMC2; 3 | WHP1 | WHP2 | HLN1 | HLN2 | STA | TBA | TBA | 11th* | 84* |

=== Complete Extreme E results ===
(key)

| Year | Team | Car | 1 | 2 | 3 | 4 | 5 | 6 | 7 | 8 | 9 | 10 | Pos. | Points |
|---|---|---|---|---|---|---|---|---|---|---|---|---|---|---|
| 2022 | NEOM McLaren Extreme E Team | Spark ODYSSEY 21 | DES; 5 | ISL1; 10 | ISL2; 6 | COP; 5 | ENE; 2 | | | | | | 7th | 46 |
| 2023 | NEOM McLaren Extreme E Team | Spark ODYSSEY 21 | DES; 1; 6 | DES; 2; 7 | HYD; 1; 8 | HYD; 2; 2 | ISL1; 1; 7 | ISL1; 2; 9 | ISL2; 1; 10 | ISL2; 2 DNS | COP; 1; 4 | COP; 2; 5 | 8th | 67 |

== TV and film ==
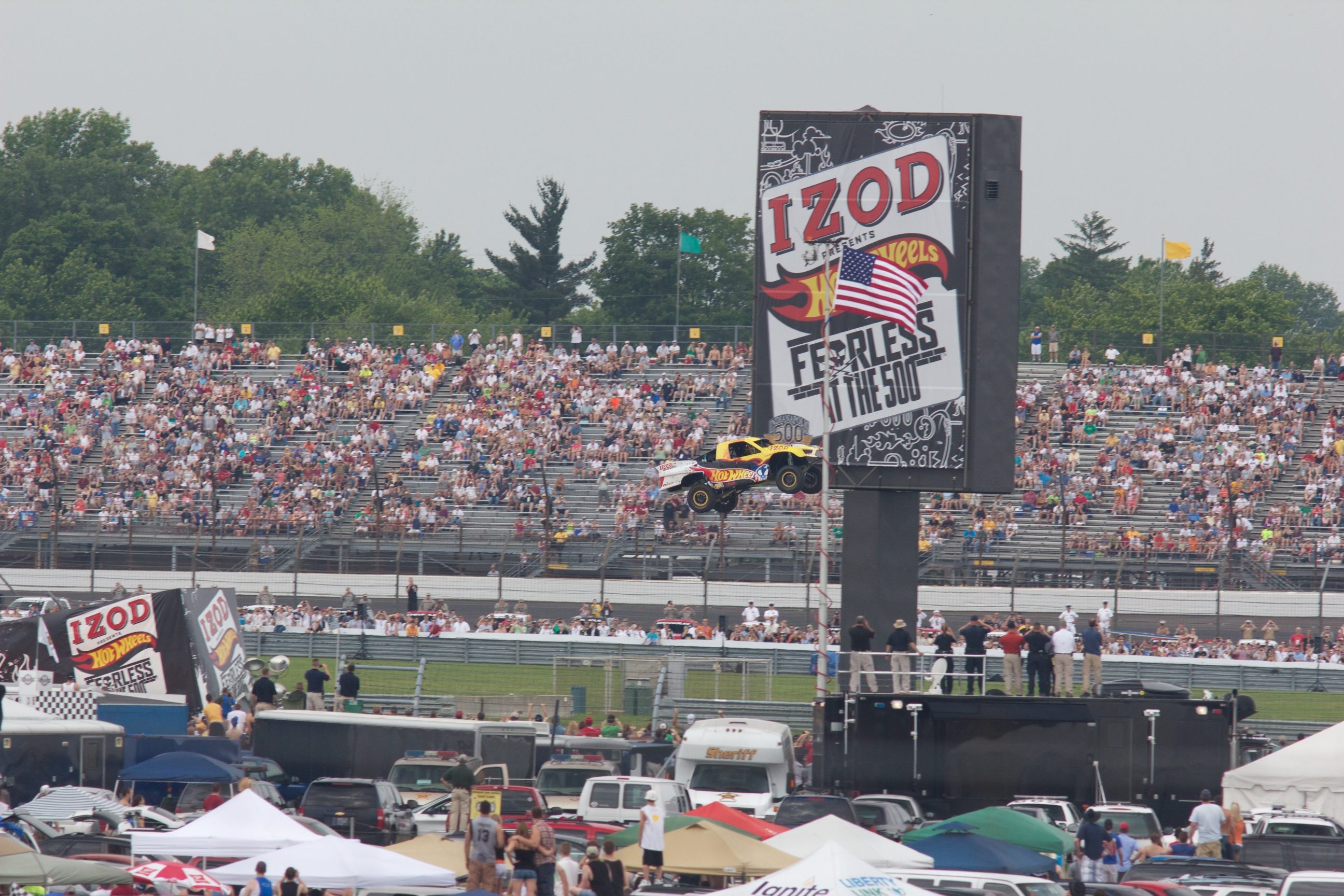
Foust, for Team Hot Wheels, jumping across the Indianapolis Motor Speedway's infield at turn 4

- The Dukes of Hazzard (2005) stunt driver
- Rally America (2005–2007) as Himself
- Formula D (2005–2007) as Himself
- Auto Access (2005–2007) Host
- Import Racers: "Bull Run" (2006) as Himself
- CSI: Miami: "Driven" (2006) stunt driver
- Fast & Furious: Tokyo Drift (2006) stunt driver
- Master of Champions: "Premiere" (2006) Contestant
- RM Classic Car Auction (2007) Host
- Redline TV (2007) Host
- Dirt: "Ita Missa Est" (2007) stunt double
- The Bourne Ultimatum (2007) stunt performer
- Numb3rs: "Velocity" (2007) stunt driver
- Top Gear (NBC) (2008) Host
- Mad Skills: Rhys Millen Is the Kiwi Drifter (2008) as Himself
- SuperCars Exposed (2008–2009) Host
- Fast & Furious (2009) stunt double
- Street Customs: "GTO" (2009) as Himself
- Battle of the Supercars (2010) as Himself
- Iron Man 2 (2010) stunt double
- Top Gear (U.S.) (2010—2016) Host
- Hot Wheels: Fearless at the 500 (2011) as Himself
- Red Dawn (2012) stunt double
- The Bourne Legacy (2012) stunt double
- Octane Academy (2012) as Himself
- Octane Academy (2013) as Himself
- Need for Speed (2014) stunt driver
- Hitman: Agent 47 (2015) hitman stunt driver
- Straight Outta Compton (2015) Stunt Driver
- Ford v Ferrari (2019) Ronnie Bucknum
- John Wick: Chapter 4 (2023) Stunt Driver

| Preceded by Rhys Millen | Formula D Champion; 2007 and 2008 | Succeeded by Chris Forsberg |
