= Adam Ferrara =

American actor and comedian

- Born: February 2, 1966 (age 60); Queens, New York, U.S.
- Education: Marist College

Comedy career
- Years active: 1991–present
- Medium: Stand-up, film, television
- Website: adamferrara.com

Adam Ferrara (born February 2, 1966) is an American actor and comedian known for playing the role of Chief "Needles" Nelson on the FX series Rescue Me. He was a co-host on the U.S. version of Top Gear and played NYPD Sgt. Frank Verelli opposite Edie Falco on Showtime series Nurse Jackie. He also played Detective Tommy Manetti on the television series The Job.

== Biography ==
Ferrara grew up in Huntington Station, New York in an Italian-American family. He is married to indie actress Alex Tyler, who is on the cover of his comedy DVD Funny as Hell. She also plays the "Beautiful She Devil" in the special's introductory sketch.

=== Career ===
Ferrara has performed on Comedy Central Presents and has twice been nominated for the American Comedy Award for Best Male Stand-Up. Ferrara frequently performs stand-up at Caroline's and the Comedy Cellar. Ferrara also tours often, performing stand-up at the top clubs around the country.

He has performed stand-up several times on The Tonight Show, the Late Show with David Letterman, and Comedy Central. His stand-up was featured in Comedy Central's animated series Shorties Watchin' Shorties in 2004.

In 2009, Ferrara performed in an hour stand-up special which aired on Comedy Central entitled Funny As Hell, and was released on DVD the same day. Ferrara appeared on The Tony Kornheiser Show on January 24, 2013, and has made numerous in-person and telephone appearances since that time.

Ferrara co-hosted the American version of Top Gear.

He recently came up with his new podcast '30 Minutes You’ll Never Get Back', which was listed as a 'must listen' by Hidden Remote.

== Filmography ==
Year	Title	Role	Notes
1993	Flying Blind	Gerald	Episode: "The People That Time Forgot"
1994	A&E's An Evening at the Improv	Self	Season 15, episode 13
1996–1998	Caroline in the City	Pete Spadaro	3 episodes
1997	Social Studies	Dan Rossini	2 episodes
1997	Dads	Carl Sr.	TV short
1999	The Love Boat: The Next Wave	Stan	Episode: "Prom Queen"
2001–2002	The Job	Tommy Manetti	19 episodes
2003	Ash Tuesday	Greg	
2003	Law & Order	Monty Bender	Episode: "Smoke"
2004	Noise	Young Detective	
2004–2007	The King of Queens	Waiter / Jack / Nick	3 episodes
2006	Last Request	Cousin Frank	
2006	A Merry Little Christmas	Donnie Manning	TV movie
2006–2011	Rescue Me	Chief 'Needles' Nelson	50 episodes
2008	Definitely, Maybe	Gareth	
2009	Paul Blart: Mall Cop	Sergeant Howard	
2009	Winter of Frozen Dreams	Burr	
2009	The Unusuals	Vice Detective #2	Pilot episode
2009	Around The Block	Sean	
2009	Ugly Betty	Sammy	Episode: "Blue on Blue"
2009	The Pack	Cassidy	
2010	Dennis Leary & Friends Presents: Douchebags & Donuts	Himself	
2011	Dirty Movie	Dr Feelgood	Comedy movie
2010–2016	Top Gear	Host	72 episodes
2013-2015	Nurse Jackie	NYPD Sgt. Frank Verelli	20 episodes
2014	Hell's Kitchen	Himself	Season 13 Episode 4: "15 Chefs Compete"
2017	Kevin Can Wait	Bill	Episode: "Choke Doubt"
2017	Criminal Minds	Bob Hammond	Episode: "Hell's Kitchen"
2018	The Good Fight	Officer Glasser	Episode: "Day 436"
2018	Deception	Officer Howie Maslin	Episode: "Getting Away Clean"
2018	Little Italy	Salvatore "Sal" Angioli	
2019	Why Women Kill	Leo Mosconi	Episode: "Murder Means Never Having to Say You're Sorry"
2021, 2024	NCIS	Sammy	2 episodes
2023	FBI	Detective Nick Zito	Episode: "Privilege"
2025	Elsbeth	Gene Genetti Sr.	Episode: "Scenes from an Italian Restaurant"
