= British Rallycross Championship =

Auto racing series in the UK

Motorsport UK British Rallycross Championship
- Category: Rallycross
- Country: United Kingdom
- Inaugural season: 1967
- Drivers' champion: Derek Tohill
- Official website: rallycrossbrx.com

The Motorsport UK British Rallycross Championship is an auto racing Rallycross series, running in the United Kingdom. From 2020, the championship became known as the Motorsport UK British Rallycross Championship 5 Nations Trophy presented by Cooper Tire.

The championship is recognised as an official Championship by Motorsport UK which is the governing body of Motorsport in Great Britain.

The current format consists of the Motorsport UK Supercars (600Hp+ Vehicles with 4WD based upon hatchbacks), The Supernational and All4Mini's, the BMW Mini Class, the Retro Rallycross, the Swift Sport, Swift Junior championship and RX150s.

== History ==
The first Rallycross event was organised at Lydden Hill circuit, near Canterbury in Kent, on Saturday 4 February 1967.

Originally intended as a one off conceived by Robert Reed, a producer on ABC TV's World of Sport programme and organised for the broadcaster by the Tunbridge Wells centre of the 750 Motor Club under the leadership of Bud Smith, the event was such a huge success that more TV specials soon followed. And it wasn't long before 'clubmans' events were being run for autocross, race and rally drivers who'd become captivated by the new sport.

The first event was won by Vic Elford – already an experienced rally driver and someone who would go on to drive in F1 and compete in sports car racing – driving a Porsche 911 owned by AFN, at that time the official importer of Porsche for Great Britain.

It is claimed that the foot and mouth outbreak of 1967, which caused the cancellation of that year's RAC Rally, gave rise to Rallycross. However, Rallycross had been born in February 1967 and the November foot and mouth disease actually prevented some drivers attending the first Rallycross event to be staged at Croft, near Darlington in County Durham, on 30 December 1967.

There is a link to the abandoned RAC British Rally of 1967. A televised Rallycross had been organised to take place following the rally. However, following its cancellation, most of the foreign drivers and teams left Britain and the Rallycross lost many of its expected star entries. The event still took place and was won by Rootes Group driver Andrew Cowan.

With the bit firmly between its teeth, ITV ran a championship season through the winter of 1967–68, the winner of which, and the first man ever to win a Rallycross championship was Welshman Tony Chappell.

ITV's monopoly on the sport, its man Reed had thought up, was lost in August 1968 when the BBC struck a deal with Lydden owner Bill Chesson giving them virtually exclusive access to events at the Kentish track. ITV moved North, basing itself at Croft and later added events at Cadwell Park, near Louth in Lincolnshire.

The television companies first fought over Rallycross then ignored it. ITV was gone by the middle '70s and BBC's coverage had declined to one or two events a year by the time it dropped the British round of the European Rallycross Championship from its roster a decade later. The British Rallycross Grand Prix was the last event to be shown by the national broadcaster but that too ended after the 1994 event – the last to be run at Brands Hatch and in the event's traditional winter slot.

Rallycross spread to Europe within a couple of years of its creation and in 1973 the 'Embassy European Trophy' was won by Scotsman John Taylor in an Ford Escort RS1600. The first officially sanctioned European Rallycross Championship followed in 1976 – won by Austria's Franz Wurz in a Lancia Stratos – the same year that Britain got its official British Rallycross Championship, won by Trevor Hopkins in an Escort RS1800.

== Past champions ==
Year	Driver	Car
2026	(Republic of Ireland) Derek Tohill	Peugeot 208
2025	(Republic of Ireland) Derek Tohill	Peugeot 208
2024	(Republic of Ireland) Patrick O'Donovan	Peugeot 208
2023	(Republic of Ireland) Patrick O'Donovan	Peugeot 208
2022	(Republic of Ireland) Patrick O'Donovan	Ford Fiesta VII T16
2021	(Republic of Ireland) Derek Tohill	Ford Fiesta VII T16
2020	(Northern Ireland) Mark Donnelly	Citroën DS3 T16
2019	(England) Julian Godfrey	Ford Fiesta VI T16
2018	(Isle of Man) Mark Higgins	Peugeot 208
2017	(England) Nathan Heathcote	Citroën DS3 T16
2016	(England) Dan Rooke	Citroën DS3 T16
2015	(England) Julian Godfrey	Ford Fiesta VI T16
2014	(England) Julian Godfrey	Ford Fiesta VI T16
2013	(England) Julian Godfrey	Ford Fiesta VI T16
2012	(England) Julian Godfrey	Ford Fiesta VI T16
2011	(England) Julian Godfrey	Ford Fiesta VI T16
2010	(England) Pat Doran	Ford Fiesta VI T16
2009	(England) Pat Doran	Ford Fiesta VI T16
2008	Lawrence Gibson	MG Metro 6R4
2007	(Republic of Ireland) Ollie O'Donovan	Peugeot 306 T16
2006	(Republic of Ireland) Christopher Evans	Opel Astra T16
2005	(England) Pat Doran	Ford Fiesta VI T16
2004	(Republic of Ireland) Dermot Carnegie	Ford Focus I T16
2003	(Republic of Ireland) Dermot Carnegie	Ford Focus I T16
2002	(England) Pat Doran	Ford RS200
2001	(Republic of Ireland) Dermot Carnegie	Ford Focus I T16
2000	Lawrence Gibson	MG Metro 6R4
1999	(Republic of Ireland) Dermot Carnegie	Ford Escort RS Cosworth
1998	(Republic of Ireland) Helmut Holfeld	Peugeot 306 S16
1997	(England) Will Gollop	Peugeot 306 S16
1996	(England) Will Gollop	Peugeot 306 S16
1995	(Republic of Ireland) Dermot Carnegie	MG Metro 6R4
1994	(Republic of Ireland) Dermot Carnegie	MG Metro 6R4
1993	(England) Mike Turpin	MG Metro 6R4
1992	(Northern Ireland) Denis Biggerstaff	MG Metro 6R4
1991	(England) Will Gollop	MG Metro 6R4
1990	(England) Steve Palmer	MG Metro 6R4
1989	(England) Michael Shield	MG Metro 6R4
1988	(England) Mark Rennison	Ford RS200
1987	(England) Mark Rennison	Ford RS200
1986	John Welch	Ford Xtrac Escort 4x4 MkIII (4WD)
1985	(England) Trevor Hopkins	Ford RS200
1984	John Welch	Ford Escort MkII Zakspeed-Turbo
1983	(England) Keith Ripp	Ford Fiesta MkI 1600 BDA
1982	(England) Keith Ripp	Ford Fiesta MkI 2000 BDA
1981	(England) Keith Ripp	Ford Fiesta MkI 2000 BDA
1980	(England) Graham Hathaway	Ford Fiesta MkI
1979	Bruce Rushton	Ford Escort MkII RS1800
1978	(England) Trevor Hopkins	Ford Escort MkII RS1800
1977	(England) Trevor Hopkins	Ford Escort MkII RS1800
1976	(England) Trevor Hopkins	Ford Escort MkII RS1800
