= World RX of Great Britain =

Rallycross event held in the United Kingdom

The World RX of Great Britain was a Rallycross event held in the United Kingdom for the FIA World Rallycross Championship. The event made its debut in the 2014 season, at the Lydden Hill Race Circuit in the village of Wootton, Kent near Dover. In 2018 and 2019, the event was hosted at Silverstone Circuit.

World RX layout of Silverstone Circuit, used in 2018–2019

World RX layout of Lydden Hill Race Circuit, used in 2014–2017

== Past winners ==
Year	Venue	Heat 1 winner	Heat 2 winner	Heat 3 winner	Heat 4 winner	Semi-Final 1 winner	Semi-Final 2 winner	Final winner
2014	Lydden Hill	(Norway) Andreas Bakkerud	(Norway) Petter Solberg	(Finland) Toomas Heikkinen	(Norway) Petter Solberg	(Finland) Toomas Heikkinen	(Latvia) Reinis Nitišs	(Norway) Andreas Bakkerud
2015	Lydden Hill	(Norway) Petter Solberg	(Norway) Petter Solberg	(United Kingdom) Andrew Jordan	(Sweden) Mattias Ekström	(Norway) Petter Solberg	(Sweden) Mattias Ekström	(Norway) Petter Solberg
Year	Venue	Qualifying 1 winner	Qualifying 2 winner	Qualifying 3 winner	Qualifying 4 winner	Semi-Final 1 winner	Semi-Final 2 winner	Final winner
2016	Lydden Hill	(Norway) Petter Solberg	(Norway) Petter Solberg	(Norway) Petter Solberg	(Norway) Andreas Bakkerud	(Norway) Petter Solberg	(Sweden) Mattias Ekström	(Sweden) Mattias Ekström
2017	Lydden Hill	(Norway) Petter Solberg	(Norway) Petter Solberg	(Norway) Petter Solberg	(Sweden) Timmy Hansen	(Norway) Petter Solberg	(Sweden) Johan Kristoffersson	(Norway) Petter Solberg
2018	Silverstone	(Norway) Petter Solberg	(Sweden) Timmy Hansen	(Sweden) Johan Kristoffersson	(Sweden) Johan Kristoffersson	(Sweden) Johan Kristoffersson	(France) Sébastien Loeb	(Sweden) Johan Kristoffersson
2019	Silverstone	(Sweden) Timmy Hansen	(Sweden) Timmy Hansen	(Norway) Andreas Bakkerud	(Norway) Andreas Bakkerud	(Sweden) Timmy Hansen	(Norway) Andreas Bakkerud	(Sweden) Timmy Hansen
