= 2014 World RX of Great Britain =

Rallycross event

- Round 2 of 12 in the 2014 FIA World Rallycross Championship
- Date: 24–25 May 2014
- Location: Wootton, Kent
- Venue: Lydden Hill Race Circuit

Results
Heat winners
- Heat 1: (Norway) Andreas Bakkerud; Olsbergs MSE
- Heat 2: (Norway) Petter Solberg; PSRX
- Heat 3: (Finland) Toomas Heikkinen; Marklund Motorsport
- Heat 4: (Norway) Petter Solberg; PSRX
Semi-final winners
- Semi-final 1: (Finland) Toomas Heikkinen; Marklund Motorsport
- Semi-final 2: (Latvia) Reinis Nitišs; Olsbergs MSE
Final
- First: (Norway) Andreas Bakkerud; Olsbergs MSE
- Second: (Sweden) Robin Larsson; Larsson Jernberg Motorsport
- Third: (United Kingdom) Andrew Jordan; Olsbergs MSE

World RX layout of Lydden Hill Race Circuit

The 2014 World RX of Great Britain was the second round of the inaugural season of the FIA World Rallycross Championship.

== Heats ==
Entries below the red line were eliminated at the conclusion of the heats.

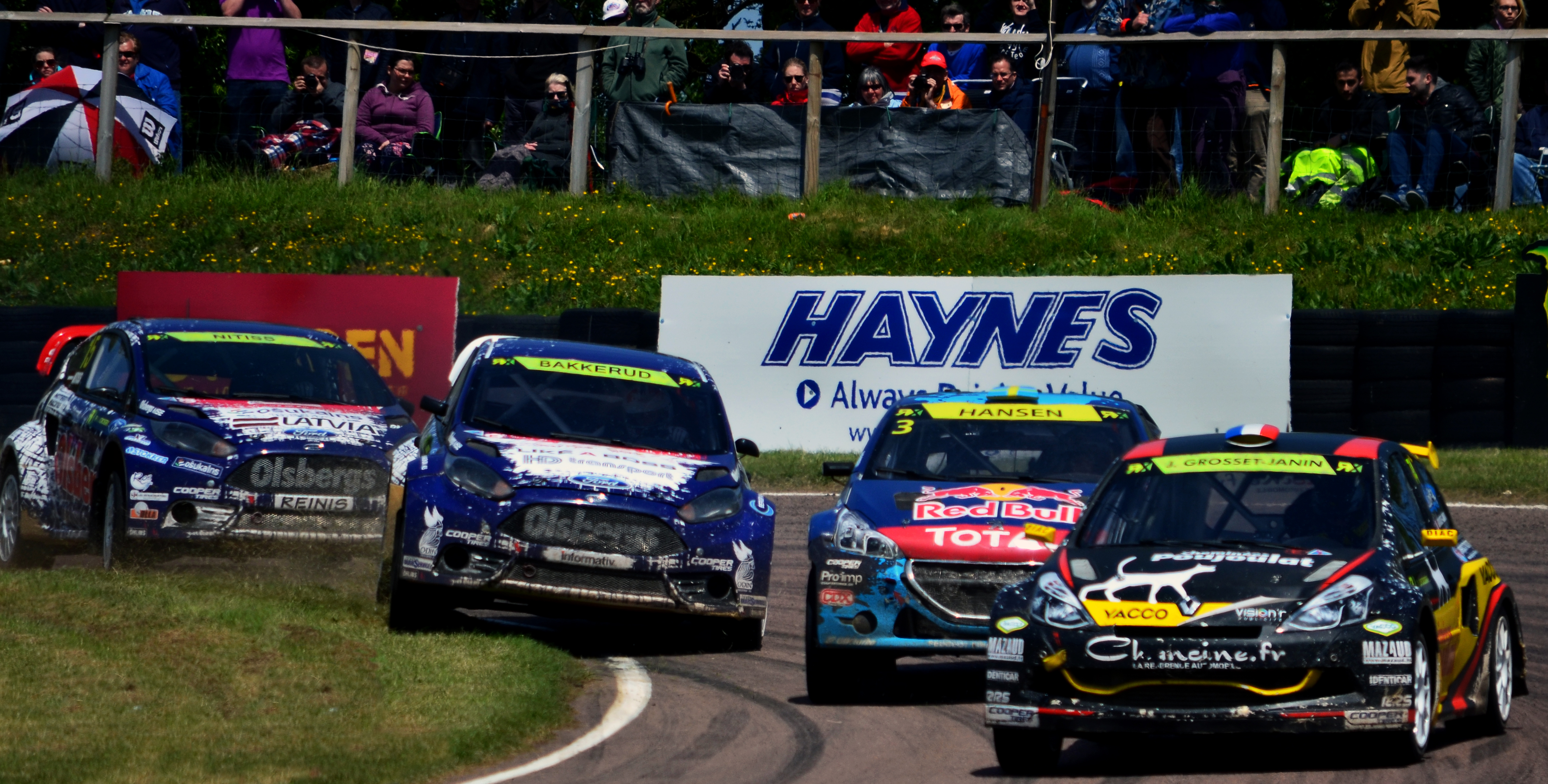
Reinis Nitišs, Andreas Bakkerud, Timmy Hansen and Jérôme Grosset-Janin

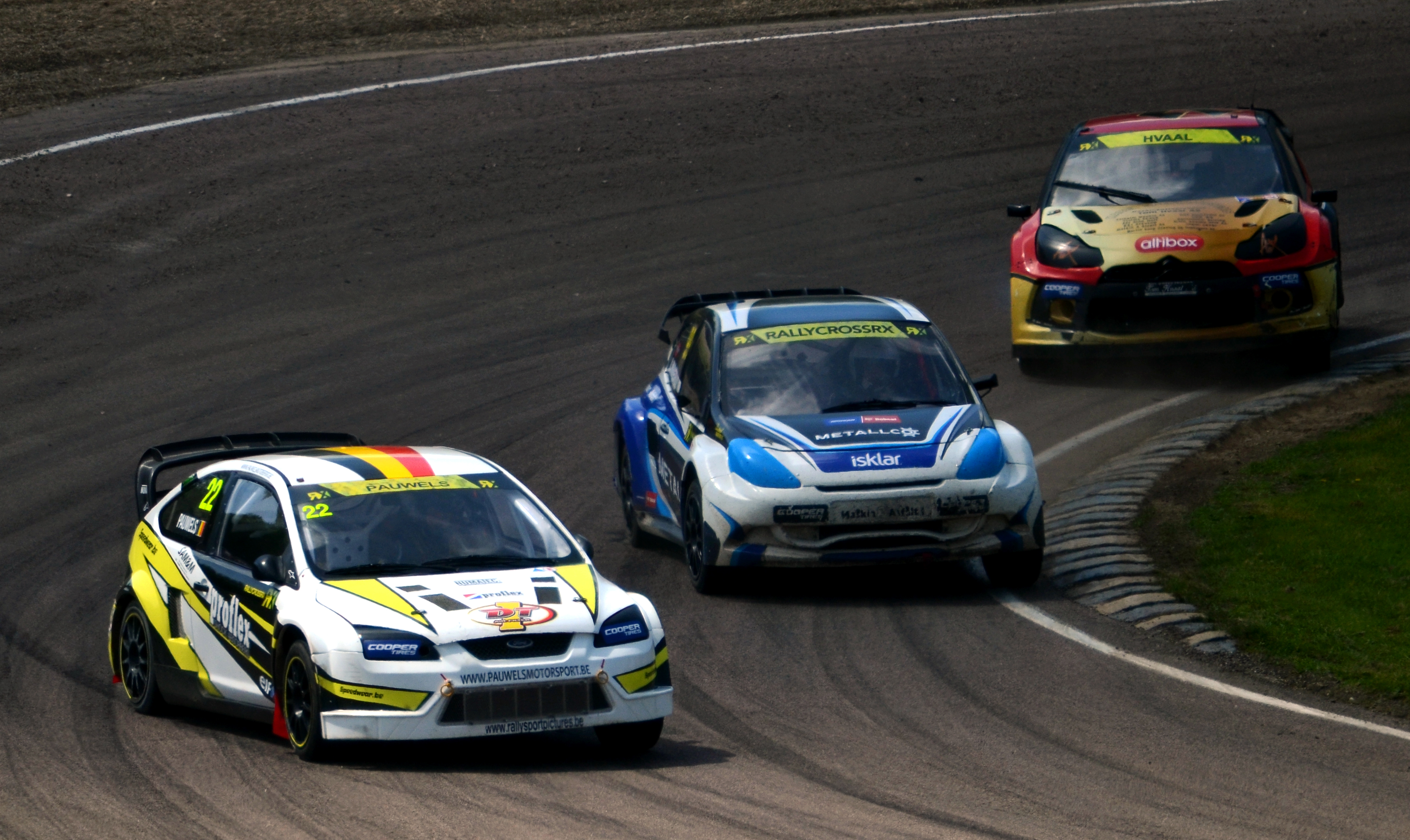
Koen Pauwels, Tord Linnerud and Alexander Hvaal

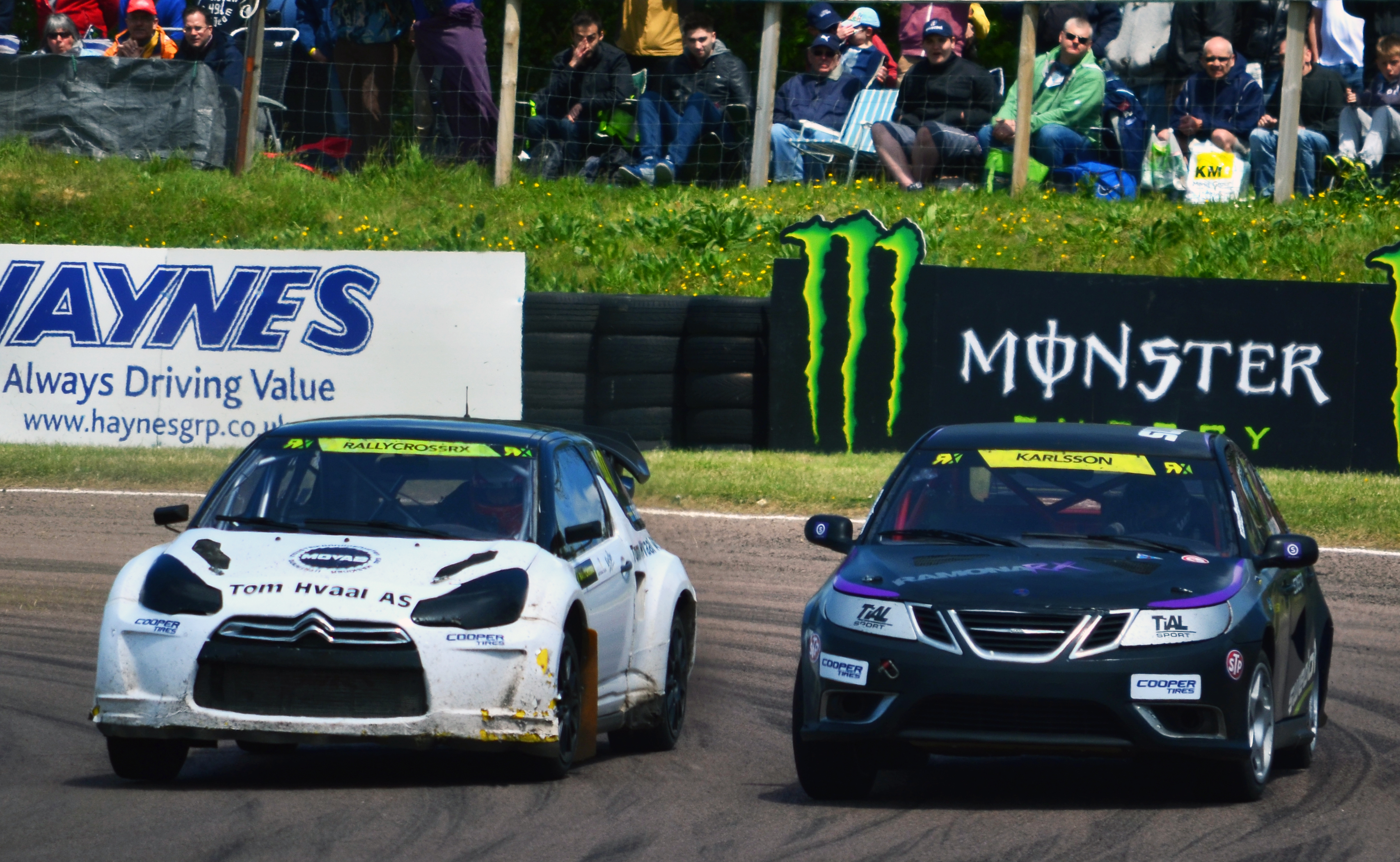
Eric Färén and Ramona Karlsson

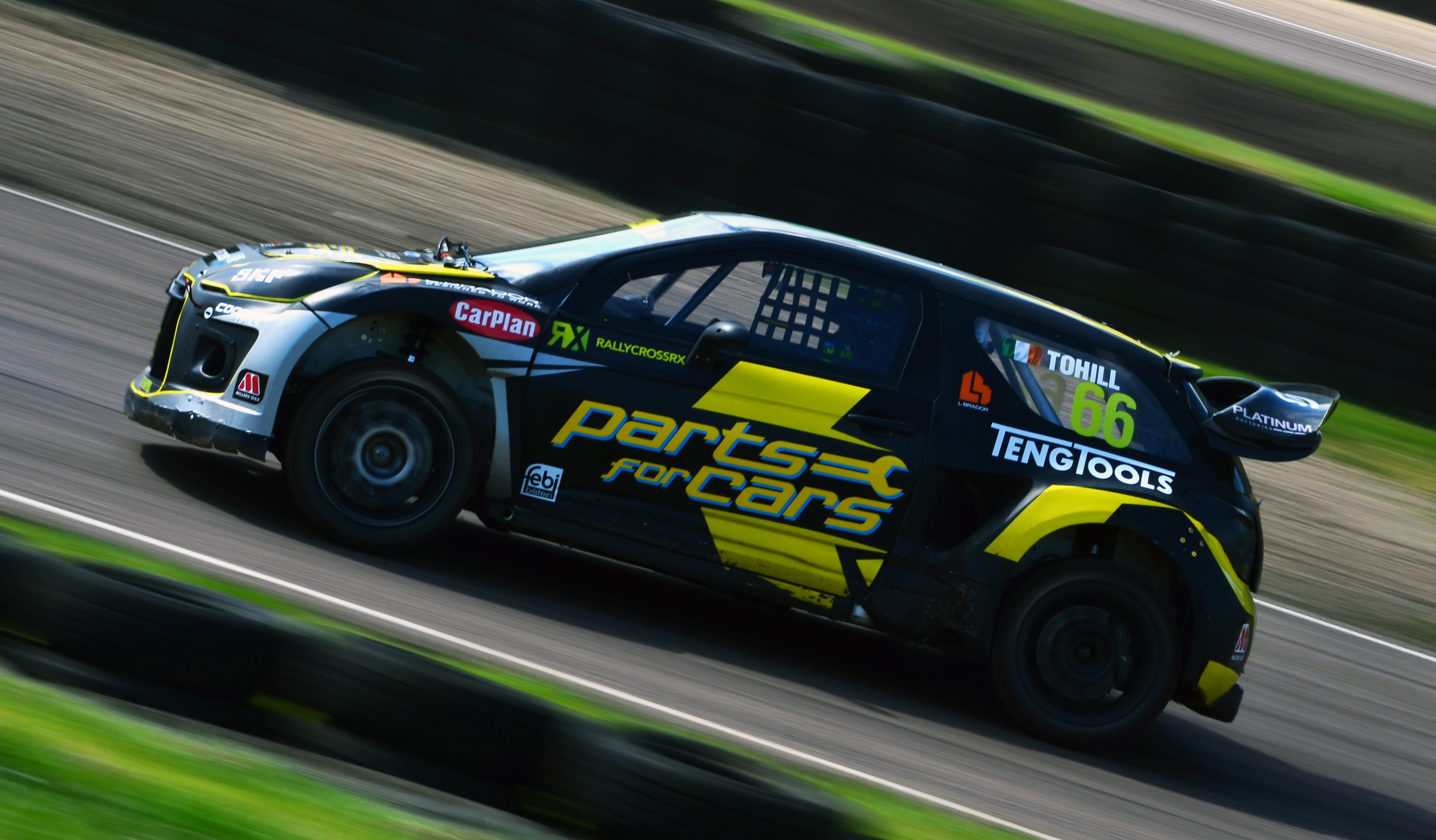
Derek Tohill

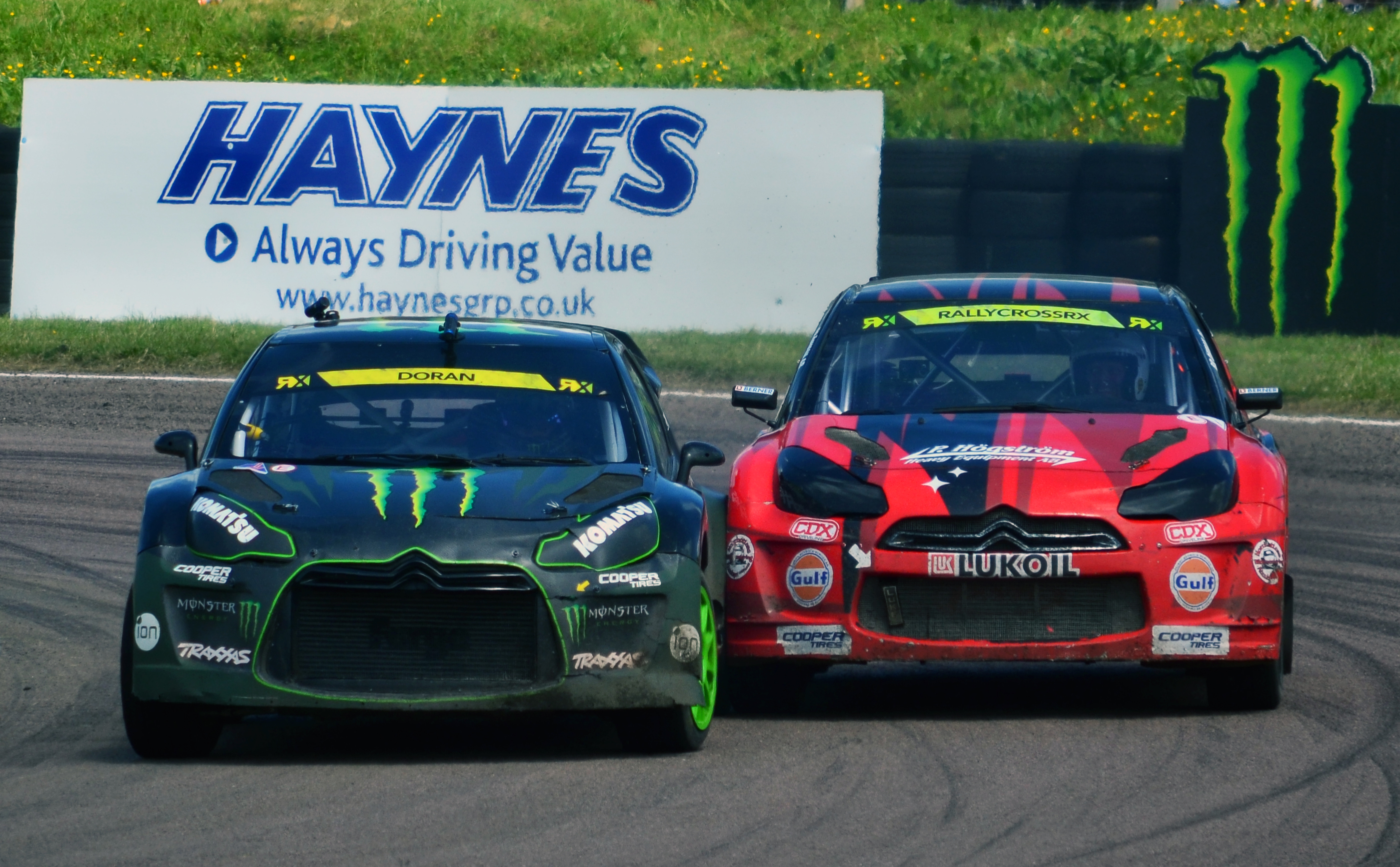
Liam Doran and Mats Öhman

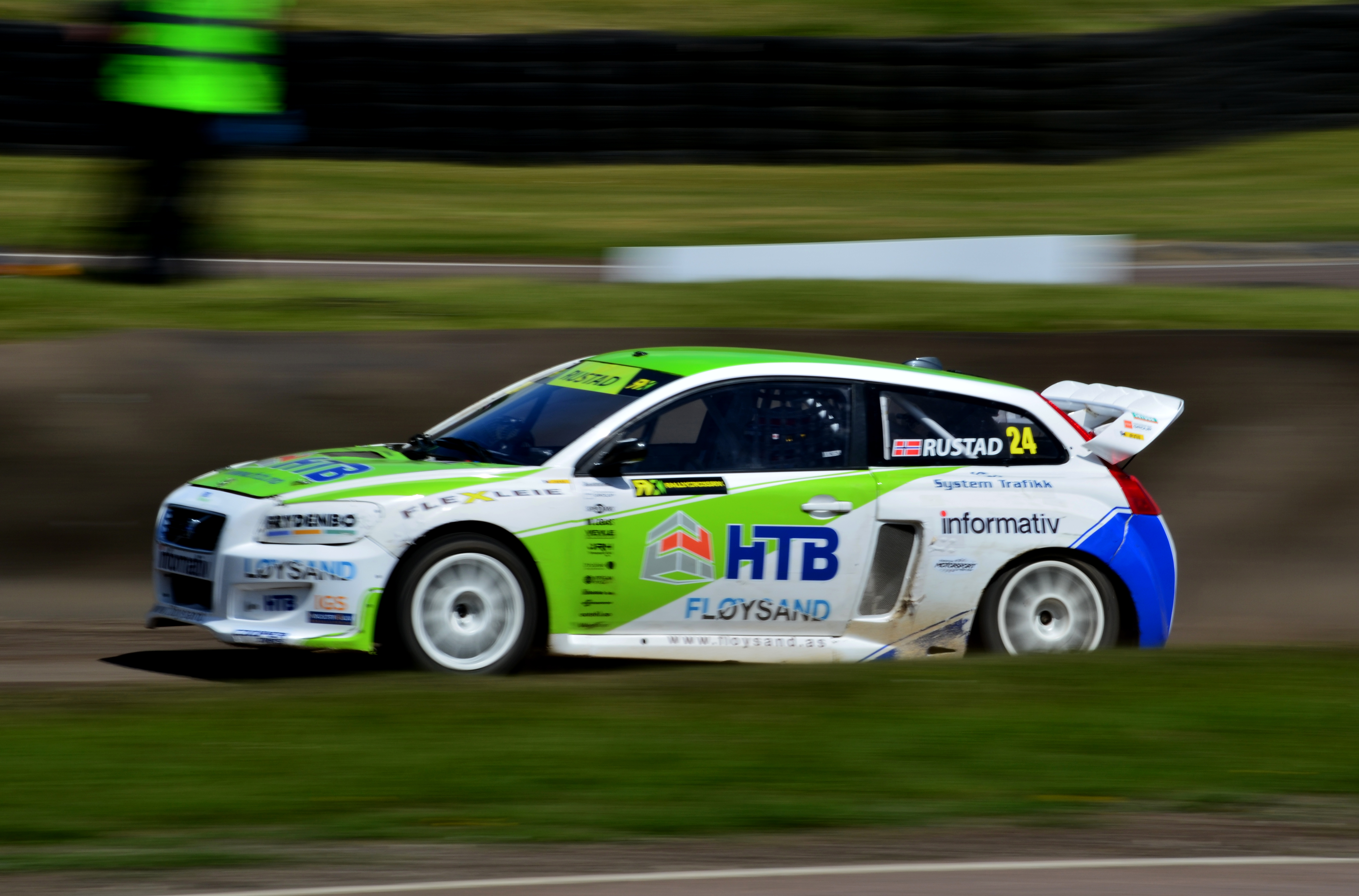
Tommy Rustad

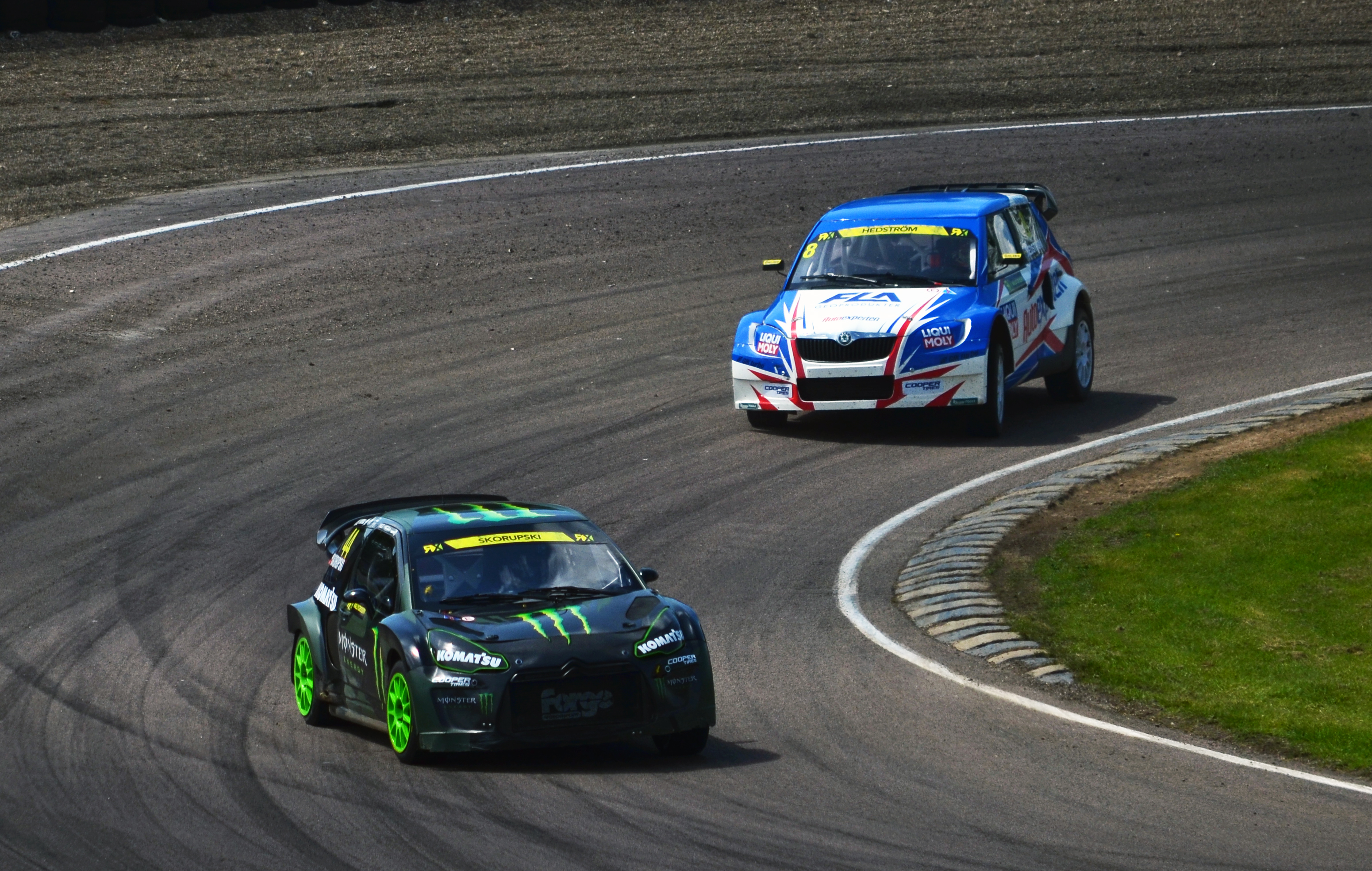
Krzysztof Skorupski and Peter Hedström

Pos.	No.	Driver	Team	Car	H1	H2	H3	H4	Pts
1	13	(Norway) Andreas Bakkerud	Olsbergs MSE	Ford Fiesta ST	1st	6th	4th	7th	16
2	4	(Sweden) Robin Larsson	Larsson Jernberg Motorsport	Audi A1	5th	3rd	8th	3rd	15
3	57	(Finland) Toomas Heikkinen	Marklund Motorsport	Volkswagen Polo	2nd	5th	1st	26th	14
4	15	(Latvia) Reinis Nitišs	Olsbergs MSE	Ford Fiesta ST	9th	8th	5th	4th	13
5	11	(Norway) Petter Solberg	PSRX	Citroën DS3	12th	1st	30th	1st	12
6	74	(France) Jérôme Grosset-Janin	Jérôme Grosset-Janin	Renault Clio	10th	10th	2nd	11th	11
7	34	(United States) Tanner Foust	Marklund Motorsport	Volkswagen Polo	4th	2nd	32nd	2nd	10
8	77	(United Kingdom) Andrew Jordan	Olsbergs MSE	Ford Fiesta ST	11th	4th	9th	15th	9
9	88	(Norway) Henning Solberg	Eklund Motorsport	Saab 9-3	15th	11th	6th	10th	8
10	26	(United Kingdom) Andy Scott	Albatec Racing	Peugeot 208	17th	13th	11th	14th	7
11	3	(Sweden) Timmy Hansen	Team Peugeot-Hansen	Peugeot 208 T16	7th	7th	3rd	33rd	6
12	92	(Sweden) Anton Marklund	Marklund Motorsport	Volkswagen Polo	6th	31st	20th	8th	5
13	20	(France) Fabien Pailler	Pailler Competition	Peugeot 208	16th	15th	15th	19th	4
14	22	(Belgium) Koen Pauwels	Koen Pauwels	Ford Focus	13th	20th	12th	20th	3
15	6	(France) Alexandre Theuil	Alexandre Theuil	Citroën DS3	24th	16th	10th	18th	2
16	48	(Sweden) Lukas Walfridson	Helmia Motorsport	Renault Clio	26th	14th	18th	13th	1
17	12	(Norway) Alexander Hvaal	PSRX	Citroën DS3	23rd	19th	16th	16th	
18	7	(Sweden) Emil Öhman	Öhman Racing	Citroën DS3	20th	22nd	19th	17th	
19	37	(Czech Republic) Pavel Koutný	Czech National Team	Ford Fiesta	19th	17th	21st	21st	
20	33	(United Kingdom) Liam Doran	Monster Energy World RX	Citroën DS3	27th	30th	17th	5th	
21	24	(Norway) Tommy Rustad	HTB Racing	Volvo C30	8th	33rd	31st	9th	
22	40	(Sweden) Eric Färén	Eric Färén	Citroën DS3	29th	25th	24th	6th	
23	54	(Belgium) Jos Jansen	JJ Racing	Ford Focus	21st	21st	13th	29th	
24	66	(Republic of Ireland) Derek Tohill	LD Motorsports World RX	Citroën DS3	22nd	12th	29th	23rd	
25	27	(France) Davy Jeanney	Albatec Racing	Peugeot 208	14th	DNF	27th	12th	
26	99	(Norway) Tord Linnerud	Helmia Motorsport	Renault Clio	18th	18th	28th	28th	
27	44	(Poland) Krzysztof Skorupski	Monster Energy World RX	Citroën DS3	DNF	28th	7th	24th	
28	51	(United Kingdom) Julian Godfrey	Julian Godfrey	Ford Fiesta	34th	23rd	14th	27th	
29	1	(Russia) Timur Timerzyanov	Team Peugeot-Hansen	Peugeot 208 T16	3rd	9th	DNS	DNS	
30	47	(Sweden) Ramona Karlsson	Eklund Motorsport	Saab 9-3	28th	24th	23rd	25th	
31	69	(Belgium) Jochen Coox	OTRT	Volkswagen Scirocco	35th	29th	22nd	22nd	
32	8	(Sweden) Peter Hedström	Hedströms Motorsport	Škoda Fabia	32nd	26th	25th	30th	
33	17	(Sweden) Mats Öhman	Öhman Racing	Citroën DS3	33rd	27th	26th	DNF	
34	21	(Poland) Bohdan Ludwiczak	Now or Never	Ford Fiesta	36th	32nd	33rd	DNF	
35	19	(France) Jean-Luc Pailler	Pailler Competition	Peugeot 208	30th	DNF	DNF	DNS	
36	14	(Norway) Frode Holte	Frode Holte Motorsport	Hyundai i20	25th	DNS	DNS	DNS	
37	2	(Republic of Ireland) Oliver O'Donovan	Oliver O'Donovan	Ford Focus	31st	DNS	DNS	DNS	

== Semi-finals ==
Drivers below the red line were eliminated at the conclusion of the semi-finals.

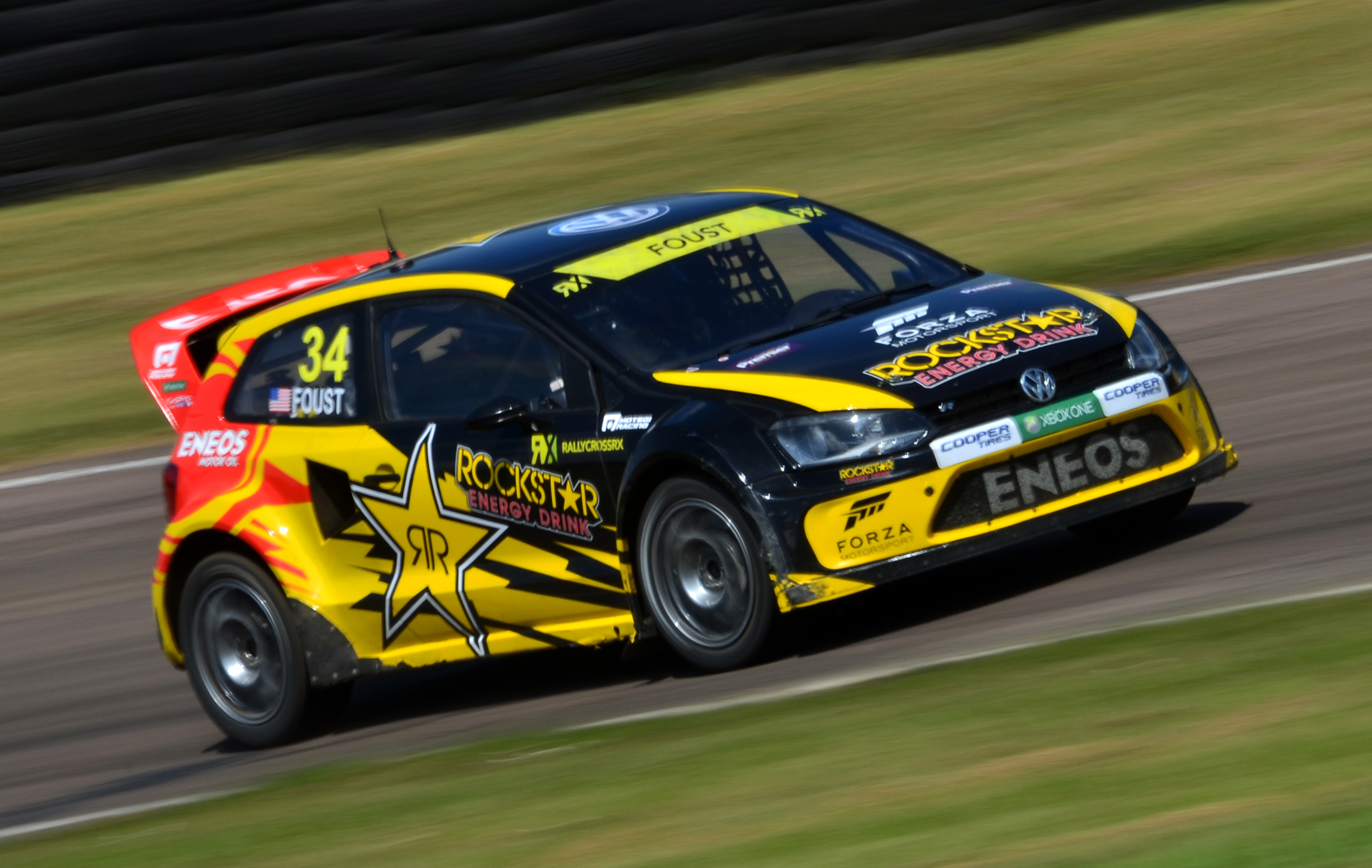
Tanner Foust

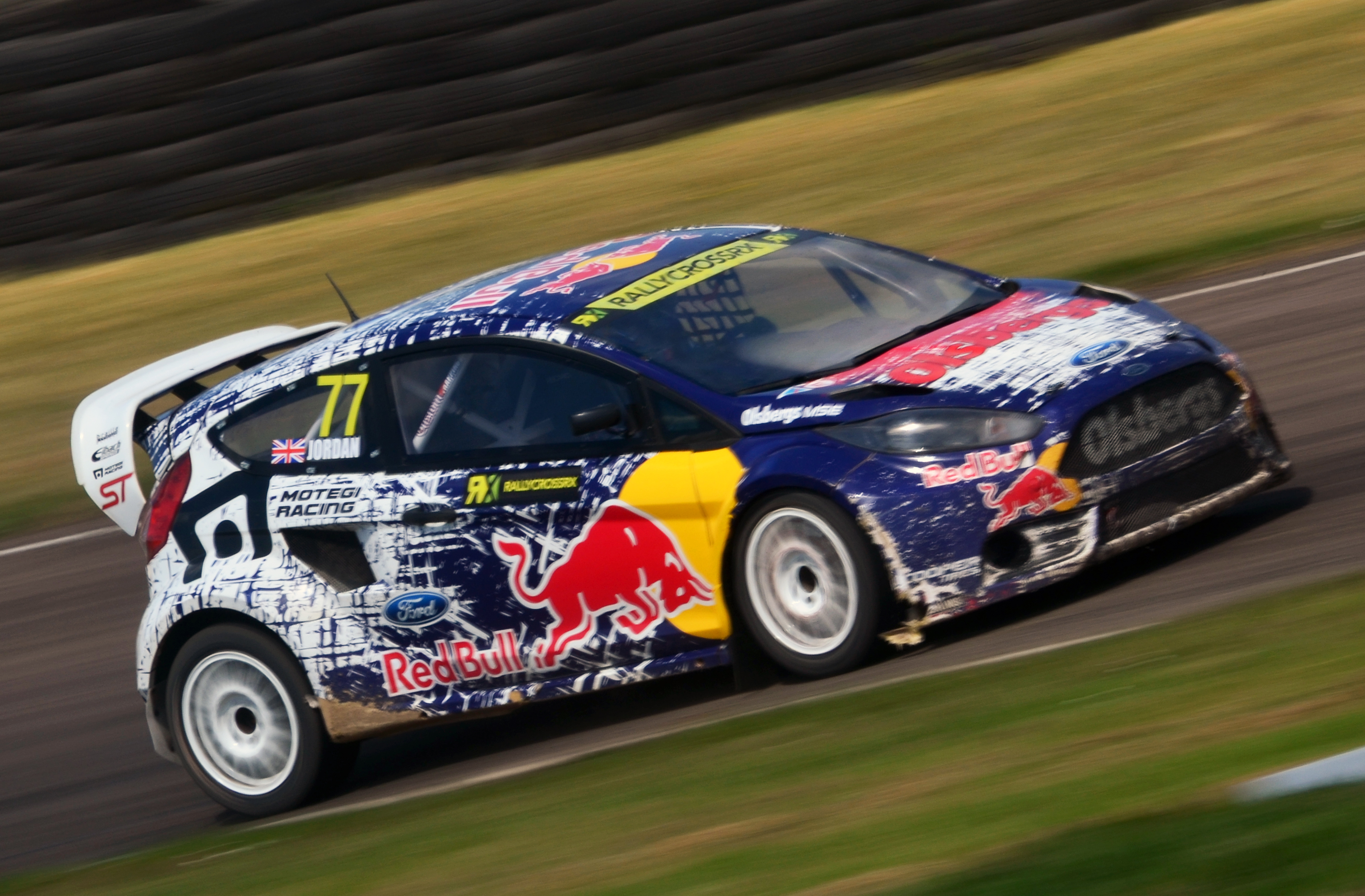
Andrew Jordan

=== Semi-final 1 ===
Pos.	No.	Driver	Team	Time	Pts
1	57	(Finland) Toomas Heikkinen	Marklund Motorsport	4:26.356	6
2	13	(Norway) Andreas Bakkerud	Olsbergs MSE	+1.616	5
3	11	(Norway) Petter Solberg	PSRX	+2.493	4
4	34	(United States) Tanner Foust	Marklund Motorsport	+14.834	3
5	88	(Norway) Henning Solberg	Eklund Motorsport	+54.192	2
6	20	(France) Fabien Pailler	Pailler Competition	DNF	1

=== Semi-final 2 ===
Pos.	No.	Driver	Team	Time	Pts
1	15	(Latvia) Reinis Nitišs	Olsbergs MSE	4:26.757	6
2	4	(Sweden) Robin Larsson	Larsson Jernberg Motorsport	+1.470	5
3	77	(United Kingdom) Andrew Jordan	Olsbergs MSE	+2.309	4
4	92	(Sweden) Anton Marklund	Marklund Motorsport	+3.795	3
5	26	(United Kingdom) Andy Scott	Albatec Racing	+11.301	2
6	74	(France) Jerome Grosset-Janin	Jerome Grosset-Janin	DNF	1

== Final ==
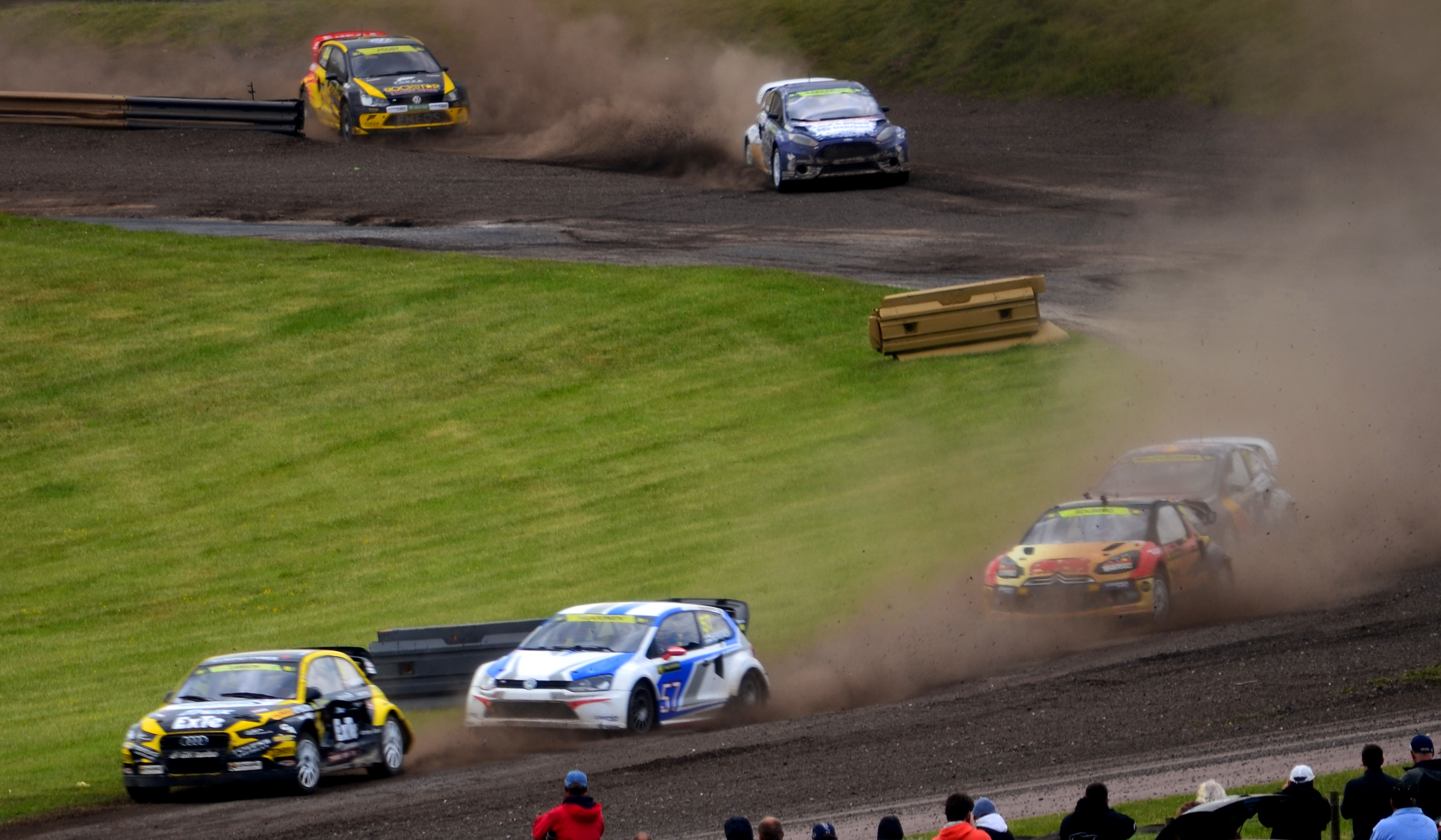
The final

Pos.	No.	Driver	Team	Time	Pts
1	13	(Norway) Andreas Bakkerud	Olsbergs MSE	4:25.428	8
2	4	(Sweden) Robin Larsson	Larsson Jernberg Motorsport	+0.541	5
3	77	(United Kingdom) Andrew Jordan	Olsbergs MSE	+1.389	4
4	57	(Finland) Toomas Heikkinen	Marklund Motorsport	+6.370	3
5	34	(United States) Tanner Foust†	Marklund Motorsport	+10.075	2
6	11	(Norway) Petter Solberg	PSRX	+12.457	1

† Reinis Nitišs was unable to take the start of the final. Tanner Foust was allowed to race by the stewards.

== Championship standings after the event ==
Pos.	Driver	Points
1	(Norway) Andreas Bakkerud	49
2	(Norway) Petter Solberg	46
3	(Finland) Toomas Heikkinen	44
4	(Latvia) Reinis Nitišs	43
5	(Sweden) Anton Marklund	26

Previous race: 2014 World RX of Portugal	FIA World Rallycross Championship; 2014 season	Next race: 2014 World RX of Norway
Previous race: None	World RX of Great Britain	Next race: 2015 World RX of Great Britain
