= 2016 World RX of Great Britain =

Rallycross event

- Round 4 of 12 in the 2016 FIA World Rallycross Championship
- Date: 28–29 May 2016
- Location: Wootton, Kent
- Venue: Lydden Hill Race Circuit

Results
Heat winners
- Heat 1: (Norway) Petter Solberg; Petter Solberg World RX Team
- Heat 2: (Norway) Petter Solberg; Petter Solberg World RX Team
- Heat 3: (Norway) Petter Solberg; Petter Solberg World RX Team
- Heat 4: (Norway) Andreas Bakkerud; Hoonigan Racing Division
Semi-final winners
- Semi-final 1: (Norway) Petter Solberg; Petter Solberg World RX Team
- Semi-final 2: (Sweden) Mattias Ekström; EKS RX
Final
- First: (Sweden) Mattias Ekström; EKS RX
- Second: (Norway) Petter Solberg; Petter Solberg World RX Team
- Third: (Sweden) Timmy Hansen; Team Peugeot-Hansen

World RX layout of Lydden Hill Race Circuit

The 2016 World RX of Great Britain was the fourth round of the third season of the FIA World Rallycross Championship. The event was held at the Lydden Hill Race Circuit in Wootton, Kent.

== Supercar ==
=== Heats ===
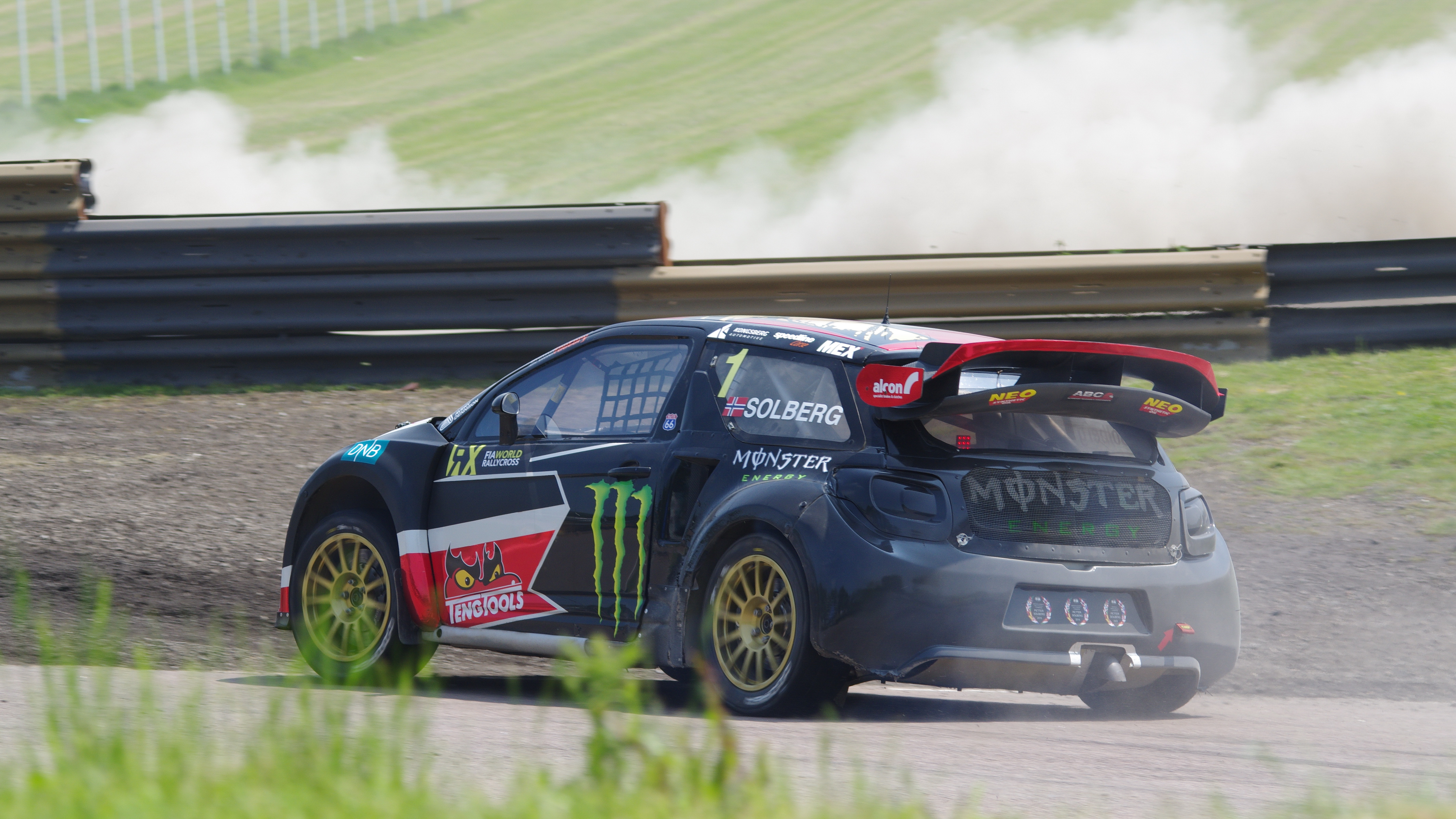
Petter Solberg

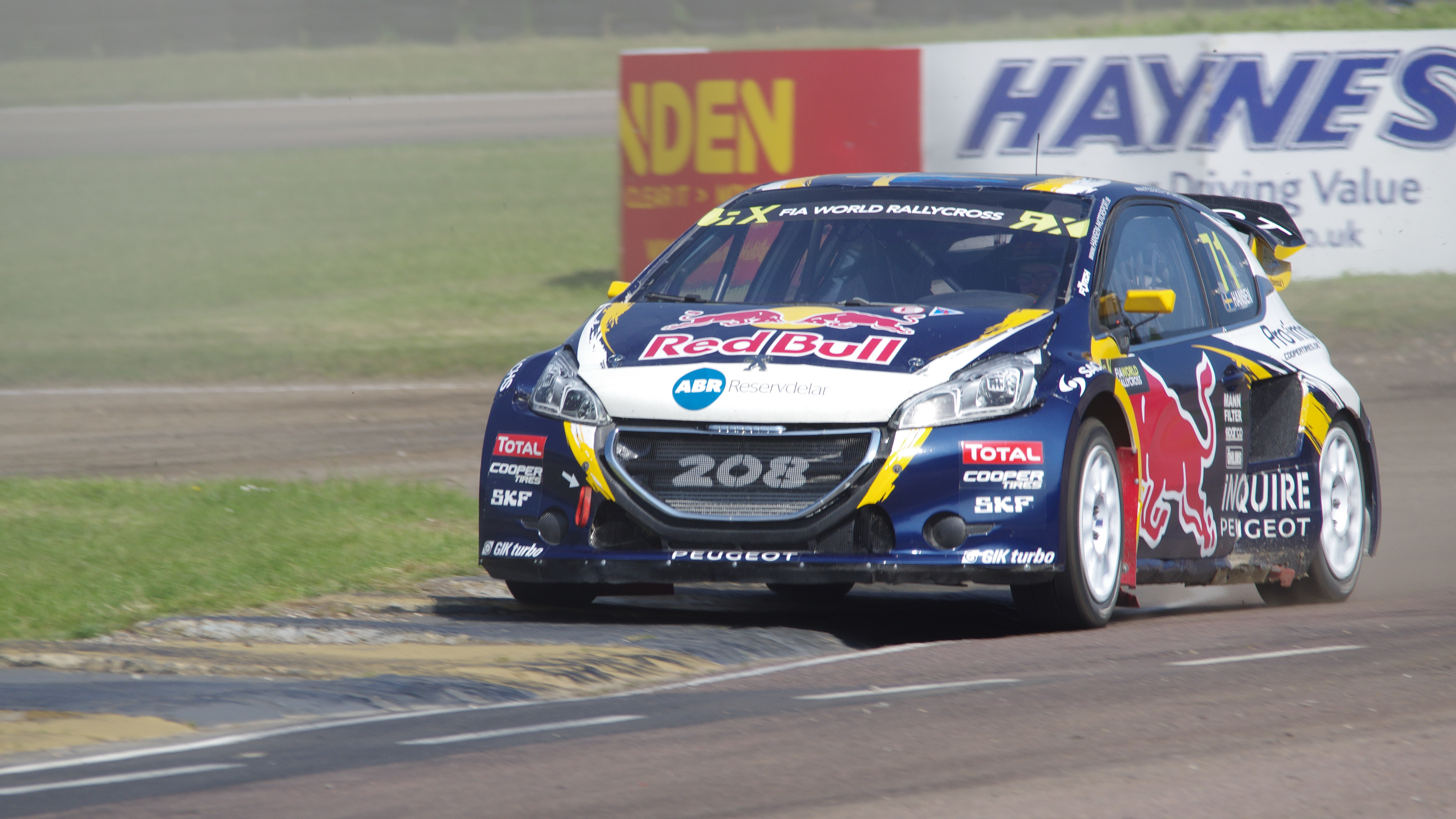
Kevin Hansen

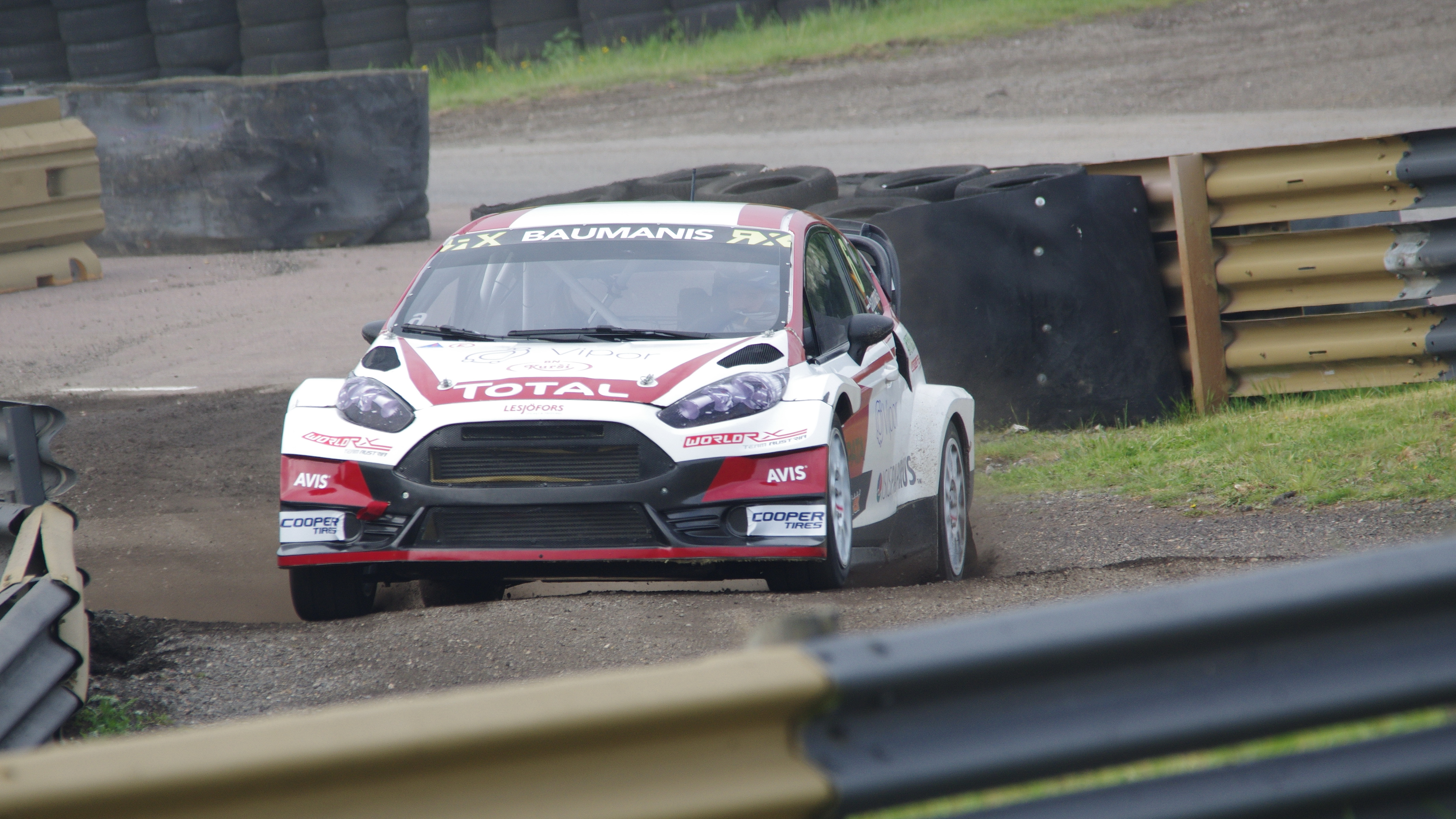
Jānis Baumanis

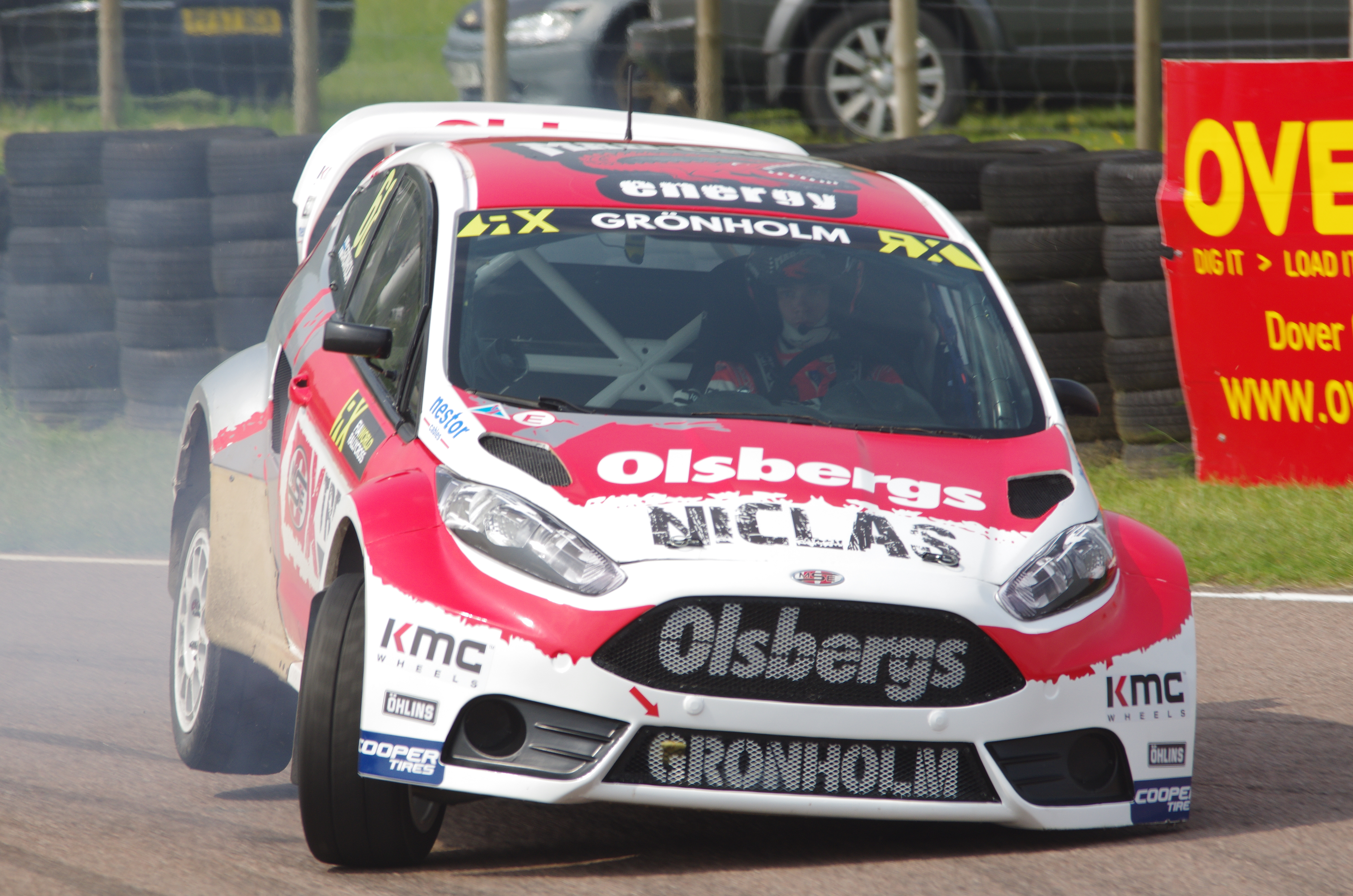
Niclas Grönholm

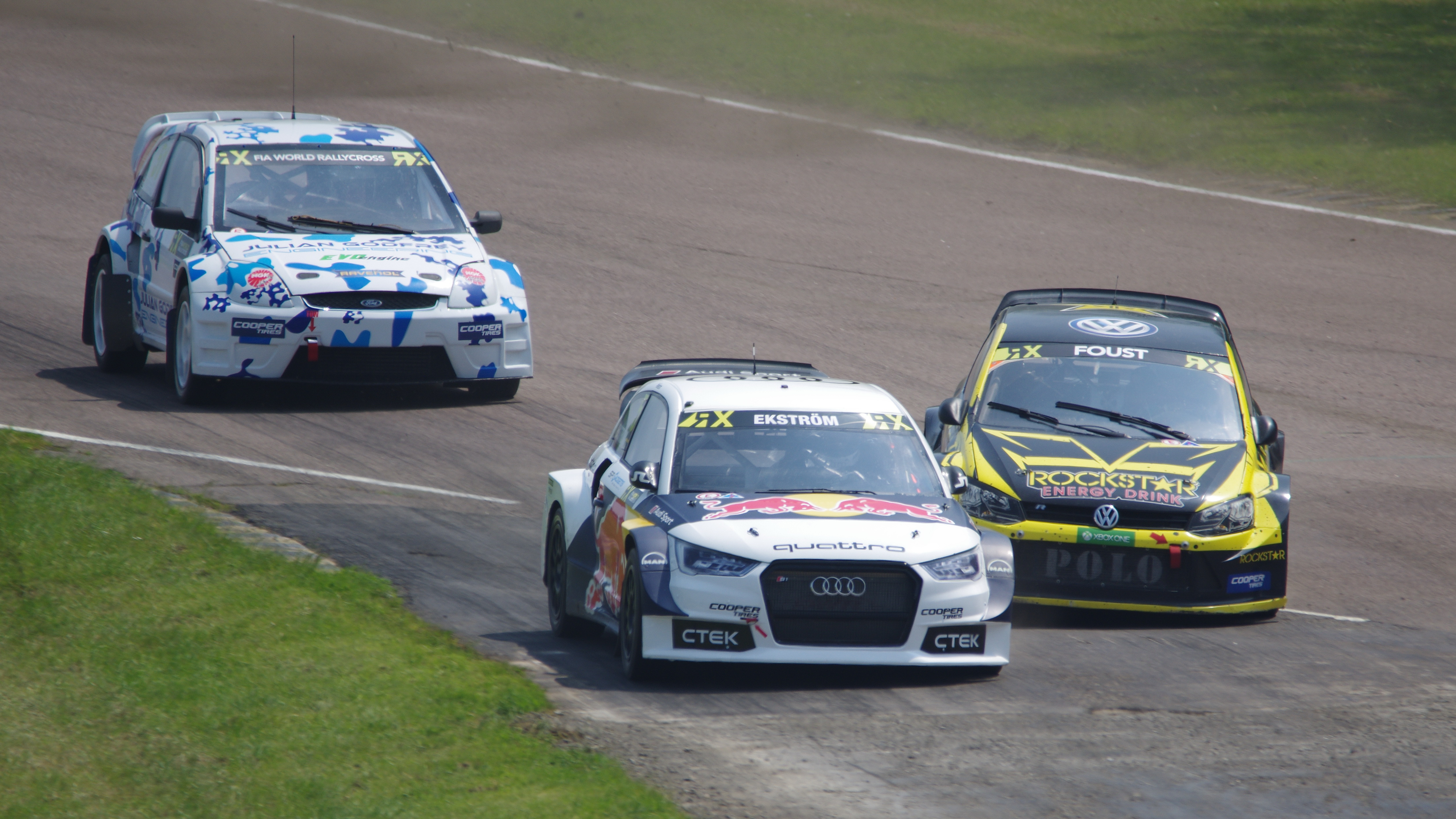
Mattias Ekström, Tanner Foust and Julian Godfrey

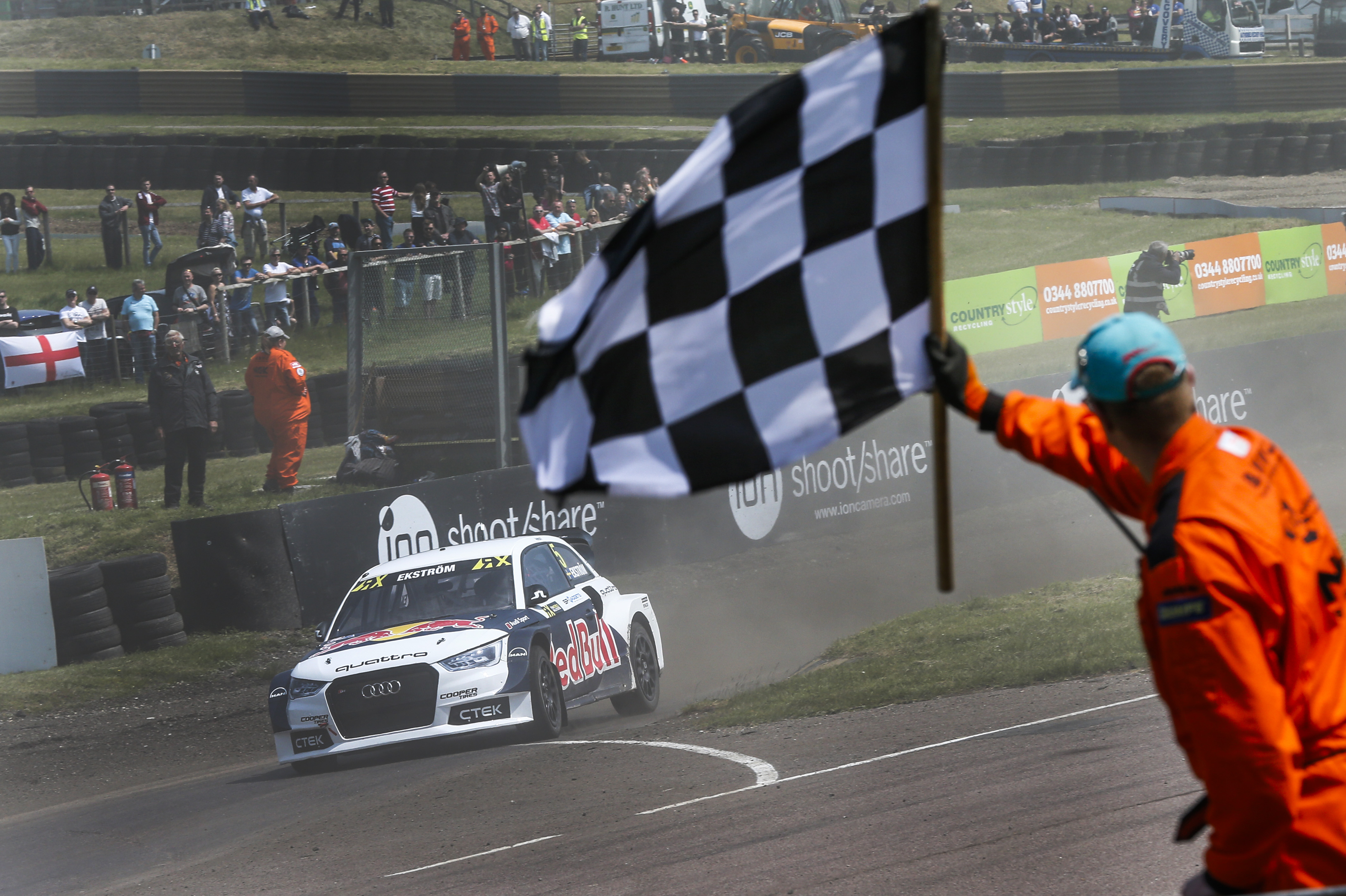
It was the third win in a row for Ekström, who maintained his five-point buffer to Solberg in the championship

Pos.	No.	Driver	Team	Car	Q1	Q2	Q3	Q4	Pts
1	1	(Norway) Petter Solberg	Petter Solberg World RX Team	Citroën DS3	1st	1st	1st	2nd	16
2	13	(Norway) Andreas Bakkerud	Hoonigan Racing Division	Ford Focus RS	4th	4th	6th	1st	15
3	21	(Sweden) Timmy Hansen	Team Peugeot-Hansen	Peugeot 208	11th	2nd	2nd	4th	14
4	5	(Sweden) Mattias Ekström	EKS RX	Audi S1	2nd	3rd	3rd	18th	13
5	57	(Finland) Toomas Heikkinen	EKS RX	Audi S1	7th	6th	7th	3rd	12
6	3	(Sweden) Johan Kristoffersson	Volkswagen RX Sweden	Volkswagen Polo	5th	10th	4th	6th	11
7	71	(Sweden) Kevin Hansen	Peugeot Hansen Academy	Peugeot 208	8th	7th	8th	7th	10
8	7	(Russia) Timur Timerzyanov	World RX Team Austria	Ford Fiesta	9th	21st	5th	5th	9
9	96	(Sweden) Kevin Eriksson	Olsbergs MSE	Ford Fiesta ST	15th	9th	13th	9th	8
10	9	(France) Sébastien Loeb	Team Peugeot-Hansen	Peugeot 208	17th	5th	19th	8th	7
11	92	(Sweden) Anton Marklund	Volkswagen RX Sweden	Volkswagen Polo	3rd	14th	21st	13th	6
12	6	(Latvia) Jānis Baumanis	World RX Team Austria	Ford Fiesta	6th	20th	10th	15th	5
13	17	(France) Davy Jeanney	Peugeot Hansen Academy	Peugeot 208	20th	13th	9th	11th	4
14	43	(United States) Ken Block	Hoonigan Racing Division	Ford Focus RS	16th	8th	17th	12th	3
15	4	(Sweden) Robin Larsson	Larsson Jernberg Motorsport	Audi A1	10th	18th	16th	10th	2
16	68	(Finland) Niclas Grönholm	Olsbergs MSE	| Ford Fiesta ST	12th	19th	11th	16th	1
17	37	(United Kingdom) Guy Wilks	Guy Wilks	Ford Fiesta	18th	11th	15th	21st	
18	55	(Germany) René Münnich	All-Inkl.com Münnich Motorsport	SEAT Ibiza	22nd	12th	18th	17th	
19	33	(United Kingdom) Liam Doran	JRM Racing	BMW MINI Countryman	19th	16th	14th	20th	
20	51	(United Kingdom) Julian Godfrey	Julian Godfrey	Ford Fiesta	21st	17th	20th	19th	
21	15	(Latvia) Reinis Nitišs	All-Inkl.com Münnich Motorsport	SEAT Ibiza	13th	22nd	12th	14th	
22	34	(United States) Tanner Foust	Volkswagen RX Sweden	Volkswagen Polo	14th	15th	22nd	22nd	

=== Semi-finals ===
Semi-final 1

Pos.	No.	Driver	Team	Time	Pts
1	1	(Norway) Petter Solberg	Petter Solberg World RX Team	4:18.164	6
2	21	(Sweden) Timmy Hansen	Team Peugeot-Hansen	+1.515	5
3	71	(Sweden) Kevin Hansen	Peugeot Hansen Academy	+3.623	4
4	96	(Sweden) Kevin Eriksson	Olsbergs MSE	+4.980	3
5	57	(Finland) Toomas Heikkinen	EKS RX	+5.287	2
6	92	(Sweden) Anton Marklund	Volkswagen RX Sweden	+10.088	1

Semi-final 2

Pos.	No.	Driver	Team	Time/retired	Pts
1	5	(Sweden) Mattias Ekström	EKS RX	4:16.462	6
2	13	(Norway) Andreas Bakkerud	Hoonigan Racing Division	+0.515	5
3	7	(Russia) Timur Timerzyanov	World RX Team Austria	+3.069	4
4	6	(Latvia) Jānis Baumanis	World RX Team Austria	+3.963	3
5	9	(France) Sébastien Loeb	Team Peugeot-Hansen	+9.929	2
6	3	(Sweden) Johan Kristoffersson	Volkswagen RX Sweden	DNF	1

=== Final ===
Pos.	No.	Driver	Team	Time	Pts
1	5	(Sweden) Mattias Ekström	EKS RX	4:17.809	8
2	1	(Norway) Petter Solberg	Petter Solberg World RX Team	+1.142	5
3	21	(Sweden) Timmy Hansen	Team Peugeot-Hansen	+2.624	4
4	71	(Sweden) Kevin Hansen	Peugeot Hansen Academy	+3.815	3
5	7	(Russia) Timur Timerzyanov	World RX Team Austria	+28.651	2
6	13	(Norway) Andreas Bakkerud	Hoonigan Racing Division	+29.186	1

== RX Lites ==
=== Heats ===
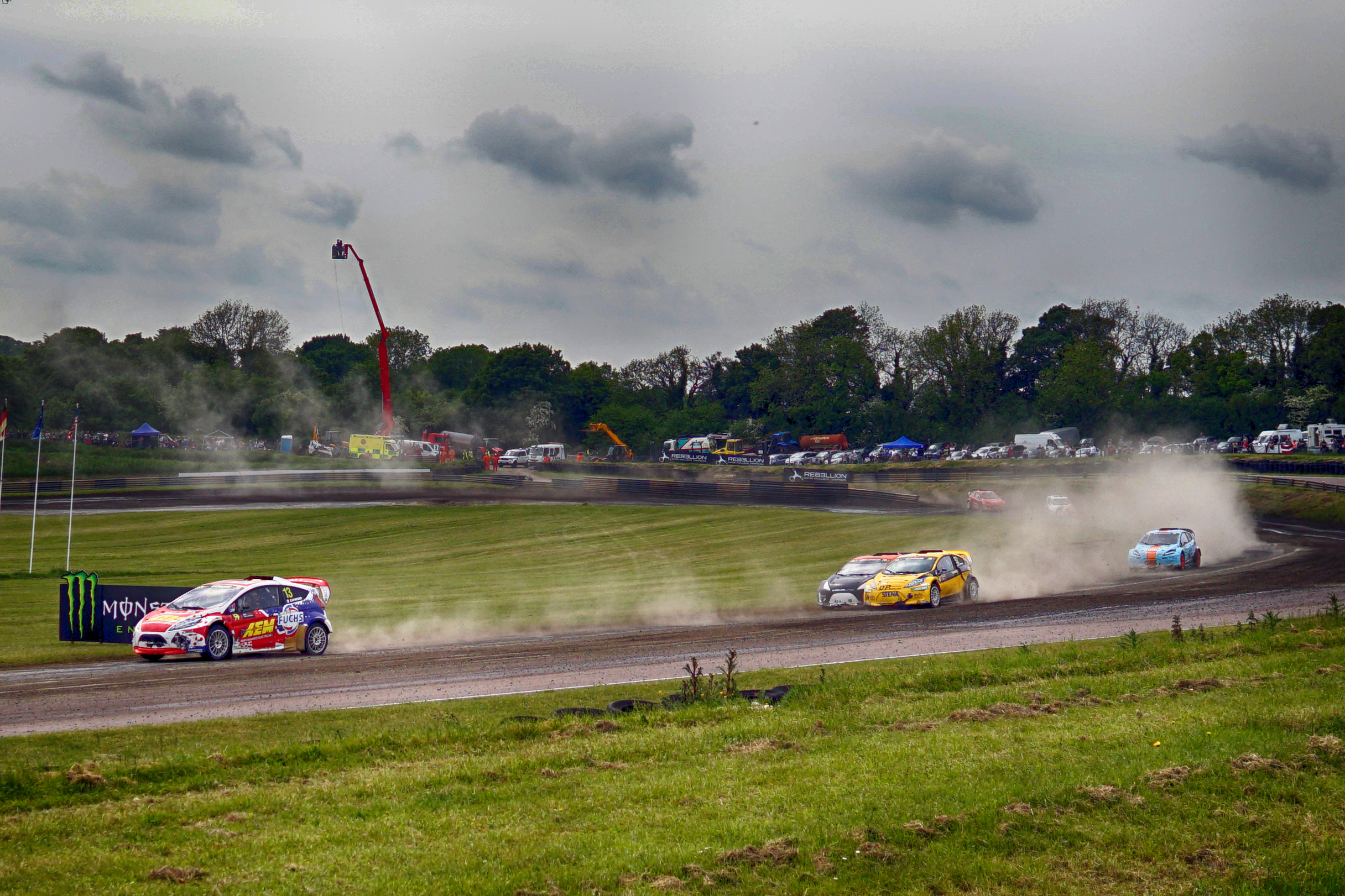
Cyril Raymond leads the RX Lites final, which he subsequently won

Pos.	No.	Driver	Team	Q1	Q2	Q3	Q4	Pts
1	8	(Norway) Simon Wågø Syversen	Set Promotion	5th	1st	3rd	6th	16
2	13	(France) Cyril Raymond	Olsbergs MSE	1st	8th	1st	8th	15
3	52	(Sweden) Simon Olofsson	Simon Olofsson	4th	3rd	10th	1st	14
4	99	(Norway) Joachim Hvaal	JC Raceteknik	3rd	4th	6th	2nd	13
5	69	(Norway) Sondre Ejven	JC Raceteknik	7th	2nd	4th	4th	12
6	33	(Kenya) Tejas Hirani	Olsbergs MSE	6th	9th	5th	3rd	11
7	40	(United Kingdom) Dan Rooke	Olsbergs MSE	9th	5th	8th	5th	10
8	18	(Turkey) Ali Türkkan	Toksport WRT	10th	6th	9th	7th	9
9	64	(United Arab Emirates) Saeed Bintouq	Olsbergs MSE	8th	7th	7th	10th	8
10	16	(Norway) Thomas Bryntesson	JC Raceteknik	2nd	10th	2nd	9th	7

=== Semi-finals ===
Semi-final 1

Pos.	No.	Driver	Team	Time	Pts
1	52	(Sweden) Simon Olofsson	Simon Olofsson	4:42.115	6
2	69	(Norway) Sondre Evjen	JC Raceteknik	+0.482	5
3	8	(Norway) Simon Wågø Syversen	Set Promotion	+1.120	4
4	40	(United Kingdom) Dan Rooke	Olsbergs MSE	+1.424	3
5	64	(United Arab Emirates) Saeed Bintouq	Olsbergs MSE	+2.827	2

Semi-final 2

Pos.	No.	Driver	Team	Time	Pts
1	13	(France) Cyril Raymond	OlsbergsMSE	4:38.970	6
2	99	(Norway) Joachim Hvaal	JC Raceteknik	+1.742	5
3	16	(Norway) Thomas Bryntesson	JC Raceteknik	+2.365	4
4	33	(Kenya) Tejas Hirani	Olsbergs MSE	+3.257	3
5	18	(Turkey) Ali Türkkan	Toksport WRT	+5.223	2

=== Final ===
Pos.	No.	Driver	Team	Time/retired	Pts
1	13	(France) Cyril Raymond	Olsbergs MSE	4:41.401	8
2	16	(Norway) Thomas Bryntesson	JC Raceteknik	+1.609	5
3	52	(Sweden) Simon Olofsson	Simon Olofsson	+2.293	4
4	99	(Norway) Joachim Hvaal	JC Raceteknik	+3.926	3
5	8	(Norway) Simon Wågø Syversen	Set Promotion	+5.452	2
6	69	(Norway) Sondre Evjen	JC Raceteknik	DNF	1

== Standings after the event ==
Supercar standings

Pos.	Driver	Pts	Gap
1	(Sweden) Mattias Ekström	105	
2	(Norway) Petter Solberg	100	+5
3	(Sweden) Johan Kristoffersson	70	+35
4	(France) Sébastien Loeb	63	+42
5	(Finland) Toomas Heikkinen	60	+45

RX Lites standings

Pos	Driver	Pts	Gap
1	(France) Cyril Raymond (racing driver)	75	
2	(Norway) Thomas Bryntesson	72	+3
3	(Norway) Joachim Hvaal	64	+11
4	(Sweden) Simon Olofsson	62	+13
5	(Norway) Simon Wågø Syversen	58	+17

- Note: Only the top five positions are included.

Previous race: 2016 World RX of Belgium	FIA World Rallycross Championship; 2016 season	Next race: 2016 World RX of Norway
Previous race: 2015 World RX of Great Britain	World RX of Great Britain	Next race: 2017 World RX of Great Britain
