= 2015 World RX of Great Britain =

Rallycross event

- Round 4 of 13 in the 2015 FIA World Rallycross Championship
- Date: 23–24 May 2015
- Location: Wootton, Kent
- Venue: Lydden Hill Race Circuit

Results
Heat winners
- Heat 1: (Norway) Petter Solberg; SDRX
- Heat 2: (Norway) Petter Solberg; SDRX
- Heat 3: (United Kingdom) Andrew Jordan; Team Peugeot-Hansen
- Heat 4: (Sweden) Mattias Ekström; EKS RX
Semi-final winners
- Semi-final 1: (Norway) Petter Solberg; SDRX
- Semi-final 2: (Sweden) Mattias Ekström; EKS RX
Final
- First: (Norway) Petter Solberg; SDRX
- Second: (Sweden) Mattias Ekström; EKS RX
- Third: Johan Kristoffersson; Volkswagen Team Sweden

World RX layout of Lydden Hill Race Circuit

The 2015 World RX of Great Britain was the 4th round of the second season of the FIA World Rallycross Championship. The event was held at the Lydden Hill Race Circuit in Wootton, Kent.

== Heats ==
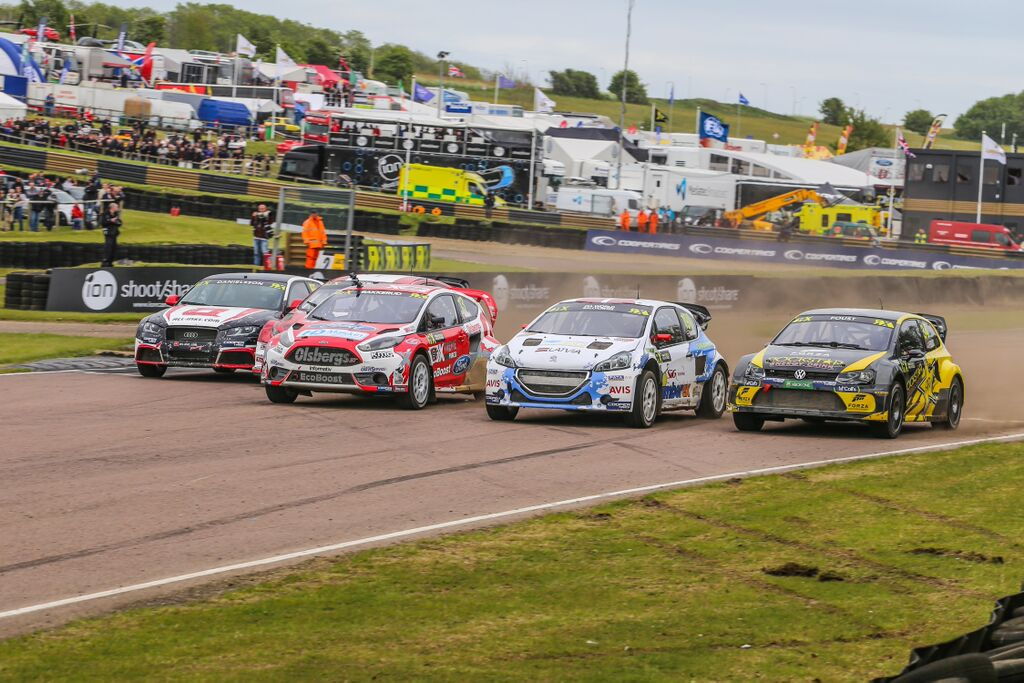
Alx Danielsson, Manfred Stohl, Andreas Bakkerud, Jānis Baumanis and Tanner Foust

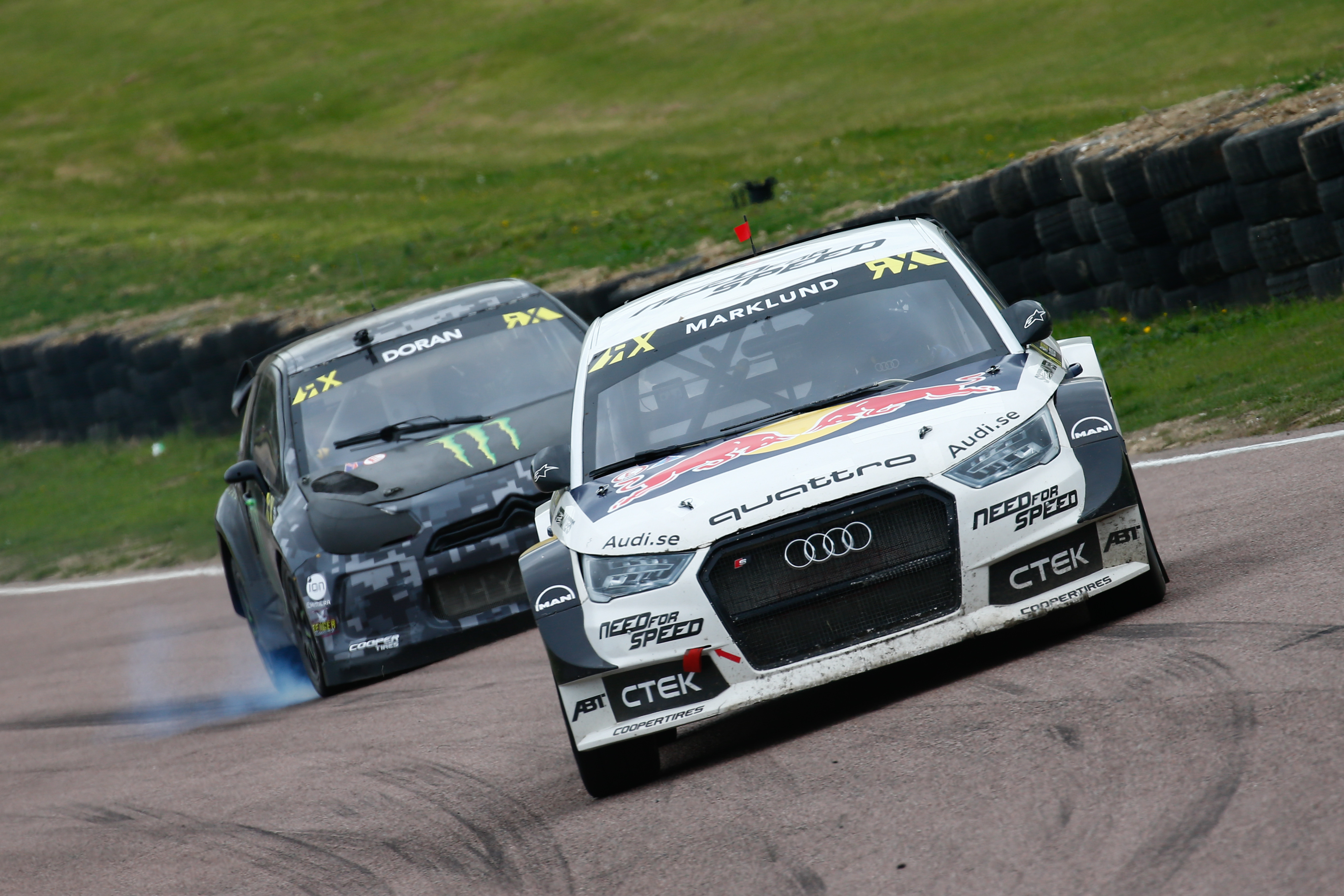
Anton Marklund and Liam Doran

Pos.	No.	Driver	Team	Car	H1	H2	H3	H4	Pts
1	1	(Norway) Petter Solberg	SDRX	Citroën DS3	1st	1st	13th	6th	16
2	10	(Sweden) Mattias Ekström	EKS RX	Audi S1	7th	3rd	6th	1st	15
3	3	(Sweden) Johan Kristoffersson	Volkswagen Team Sweden	Volkswagen Polo	2nd	2nd	5th	7th	14
4	13	(Norway) Andreas Bakkerud	Olsbergs MSE	Ford Fiesta	13th	6th	2nd	3rd	13
5	15	(Latvia) Reinis Nitišs	Olsbergs MSE	Ford Fiesta	5th	7th	4th	12th	12
6	177	(United Kingdom) Andrew Jordan	Team Peugeot-Hansen	Peugeot 208	9th	15th	1st	14th	11
7	17	(Sweden) Timmy Hansen	Team Peugeot-Hansen	Peugeot 208	3rd	27th	15th	2nd	10
8	37	(United Kingdom) Guy Wilks	JRM Racing	BMW MINI Countryman	16th	10th	7th	10th	9
9	99	(Norway) Tord Linnerud	Volkswagen Team Sweden	Volkswagen Polo	10th	5th	10th	18th	8
10	7	(Austria) Manfred Stohl	World RX Team Austria	Ford Fiesta	12th	11th	18th	4th	7
11	4	(Sweden) Robin Larsson	Larsson Jernberg Racing Team	Audi A1	26th	9th	9th	5th	6
12	21	(France) Davy Jeanney	Team Peugeot-Hansen	Peugeot 208	24th	14th	3rd	9th	5
13	45	(Sweden) Per-Gunnar Andersson	Marklund Motorsport	Volkswagen Polo	6th	8th	22nd	13th	4
14	92	(Sweden) Anton Marklund	EKS RX	Audi S1	27th	4th	12th	11th	3
15	57	(Finland) Toomas Heikkinen	Marklund Motorsport	Volkswagen Polo	4th	12th	8th	28th	2
16	34	(United States) Tanner Foust	Marklund Motorsport	Volkswagen Polo	15th	21st	14th	8th	1
17	33	(United Kingdom) Liam Doran	SDRX	Citroën DS3	28th	13th	11th	13th	
18	42	(Russia) Timur Timerzyanov	Namus OMSE	Ford Fiesta	8th	16th	28th	15th	
19	71	(France) Marc Laboulle	Marc Laboulle	Citroën C4	17th	18th	16th	21st	
20	199	(Latvia) Jānis Baumanis	Hansen Talent Development	Peugeot 208	14th	29th	19th	19th	
21	50	(United Kingdom) Kevin Procter	Kevin Procter	Ford Fiesta	19th	25th	17th	23rd	
22	2	(Republic of Ireland) Oliver O'Donovan	Oliver O'Donovan	Ford Fiesta	23rd	17th	27th	20th	
23	81	(United Kingdom) David Binks	Albatec Racing	Peugeot 208	20th	23rd	20th	24th	
24	26	(United Kingdom) Andy Scott	Albatec Racing	Peugeot 208	18th	20th	24th	25th	
25	51	(United Kingdom) Julian Godfrey	Julian Godfrey	Ford Fiesta	29th	22nd	23rd	17th	
26	55	(Germany) René Münnich	All-Inkl.com Münnich Motorsport	Audi S3	21st	28th	21st	27th	
27	91	(Norway) Guttorm Lindefjell	CircleX	Ford Focus	25th	26th	25th	22nd	
28	31	(Austria) Max Pucher	World RX Team Austria	Ford Fiesta	22nd	24th	26th	26th	
29	77	(Sweden) Alx Danielsson	All-Inkl.com Münnich Motorsport	Audi S3	11th	19th	29th	29th	

== Semi-finals ==
=== Semi-final 1 ===
Pos.	No.	Driver	Team	Time	Pts
1	1	(Norway) Petter Solberg	SDRX	4:30.381	6
2	3	(Sweden) Johan Kristoffersson	Volkswagen Team Sweden	+1.280	5
3	15	(Latvia) Reinis Nitišs	Olsbergs MSE	+3.145	4
4	17	(Sweden) Timmy Hansen	Team Peugeot-Hansen	+3.380	3
5	99	(Norway) Tord Linnerud	Volkswagen Team Sweden	+6.819	2
6	4	(Sweden) Robin Larsson	Larsson Jernberg Racing Team	+11.361	1

=== Semi-final 2 ===
Pos.	No.	Driver	Team	Time	Pts
1	10	(Sweden) Mattias Ekström	EKS RX	4:27.300	6
2	13	(Norway) Andreas Bakkerud	Olsbergs MSE	+3.417	5
3	37	(United Kingdom) Guy Wilks	JRM Racing	+4.000	4
4	21	(France) Davy Jeanney	Team Peugeot-Hansen	+4.822	3
5	177	(United Kingdom) Andrew Jordan	Team Peugeot-Hansen	+5.289	2
6	7	(Austria) Manfred Stohl	World RX Team Austria	+24.470	1

== Final ==
Pos.	No.	Driver	Team	Time	Pts
1	1	(Norway) Petter Solberg	SDRX	4:25.064	8
2	10	(Sweden) Mattias Ekström	EKS RX	+0.333	5
3	3	(Sweden) Johan Kristoffersson	Volkswagen Team Sweden	+2.628	4
4	13	(Norway) Andreas Bakkerud	Olsbergs MSE	+2.876	3
5	15	(Latvia) Reinis Nitišs	Olsbergs MSE	+4.234	2
6	37	(United Kingdom) Guy Wilks	JRM Racing	DNF	1

== Championship standings after the event ==
Pos.	Driver	Points
1	(Norway) Petter Solberg	112
2	(Sweden) Johan Kristoffersson	83
3	(Norway) Andreas Bakkerud	77
4	(Sweden) Timmy Hansen	63
5	(Latvia) Reinis Nitišs	61

Previous race: 2015 World RX of Belgium	FIA World Rallycross Championship; 2015 season	Next race: 2015 World RX of Germany
Previous race: 2014 World RX of Great Britain	World RX of Great Britain	Next race: 2016 World RX of Great Britain
