= Lydden Hill Race Circuit =

Racing circuit near Canterbury in Kent, England

- Location: Wootton, Kent, United Kingdom
- Coordinates: 51°10′38.59″N 1°11′58.69″E
- FIA Grade: 6R (Rallycross)
- Operator: Pat Doran
- Opened: 1955
- Architect: Bill Chesson
- Former names: Lydden Circuit
- Major events: Former: FIA World Rallycross Championship; World RX of Great Britain (2014–2017); FIA European Rallycross Championship; Euro RX of Great Britain (1973–1976, 1978–1992, 1996, 2009–2018, 2023); Nitro RX (2022); Titans-RX Europe (2019)

Full Circuit
- Length: 1.000 mi (1.609 km)
- Turns: 4
- Race lap record: 0:38.300 (Rob Cox, Lola LC88, 1989, F1)

Rallycross Circuit
- Length: 0.870 mi (1.400 km)
- Turns: 4

Lydden Hill Race Circuit (formerly known as Lydden Circuit) is a motorsport venue in Denton with Wootton, about half-way between Canterbury and Dover in Kent, England. The mile-long circuit is mainly used for Rallycross, Drift, Saloon and Sports car racing as well as Motorcycle racing.

It is the shortest road racing circuit in the United Kingdom. The track was previously owned by the McLaren Group and is one of two motor racing circuits in the county of Kent, along with Brands Hatch.

== History ==
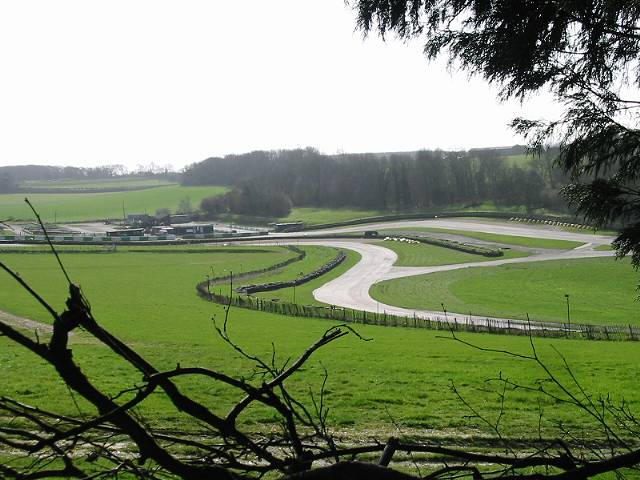
View of Dover Slope and Devils Elbow on Lydden Hill Race Circuit

Lydden was founded in 1955 by Bill Chesson with the help of the Astra Motor Club. From 1957, they promoted stock-car racing and grass-track racing for motorcycles. By 1962, Chesson wanted to progress and laid a tarmac track in order to promote motor and motorcycle road racing. The original plan was for a 1-mile circuit, but this scheme had to be put on hold when the tarmac ran out at what is known as the Devil’s Elbow; the result was the short circuit.

In 1965, tarmac asphalt was laid for hosting car racing up to Formula Three.

On 4 February 1967, the sport of Rallycross was born at Lydden, thought up by TV producer Robert Reed and race organiser Bud Smith in co-operation with Chesson. Combining tarmac and non-tarmac elements, the inaugural race was won by Vic Elford in a Porsche 911. Since 1973, Lydden Circuit has seen rounds of Embassy/ERA European Rallycross Championships and FIA European Championships for Rallycross Drivers, the first 23 were all organised by the Thames Estuary Automobile Club (TEAC). To this day, Lydden, as the so-called "Home of Rallycross", still holds British Rallycross Championship racing.

On 9 September 1968, then-unknown English driver James Hunt recorded his first race win driving a Russell-Alexis Mk14 Formula Ford car. Hunt would return on 5 May 1969, this time driving a Motor Racing Enterprises entered Merlyn Mk11A, and recorded his second ever win.

By 1986, the RAC Motor Sports Association (MSA) was pressurising Bill Chesson to erect Armco barriers, but he refused to do so, on the grounds that they would be dangerous to the motorcycle-racing fraternity. When RAC MSA threatened to refuse him a new circuit permit, he put it up for sale. Tom Bissett bought the circuit.

From 2008 the new lease holder was the British Rallycross Champion Pat Doran.

On 24–25 May 2014, Lydden Hill played host to the newly formed FIA World Rallycross Championship. The event was run under similar principles to the FIA European Rallycross Championship in the previous few years, but with the likes of Petter Solberg and Liam Doran being notable drivers competing in the championship.

The American Nitro Rallycross series raced at Lydden Hill to begin the 2022–23 season on 18–19 June. Lydden Hill is the first track to host Nitro RX outside North America.

== European rallycross returns ==
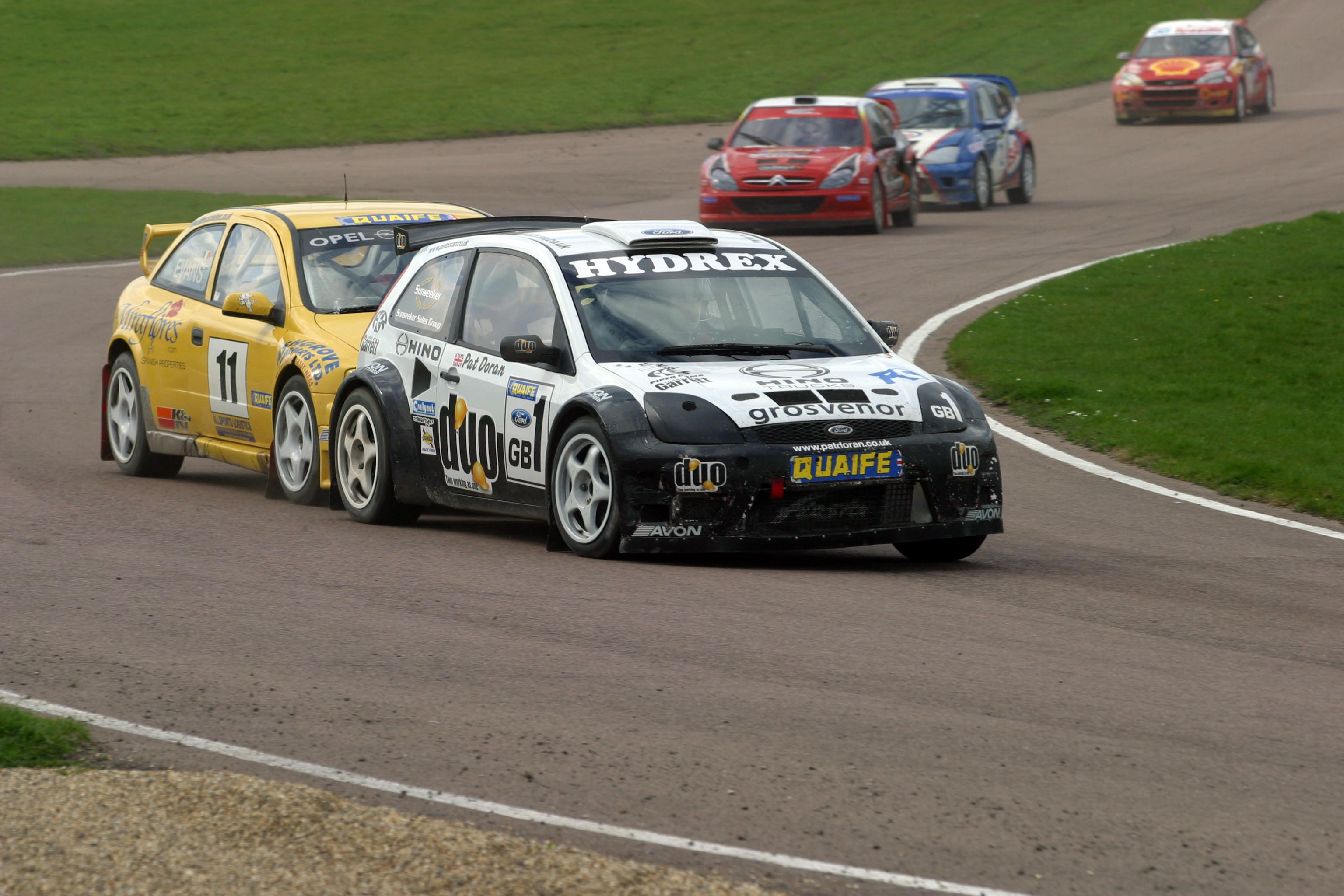
Pat Doran and his Ford Fiesta, Lydden 2006

The opening round of the 2009 FIA European Rallycross Championship (ERC) brought top flight Rallycross back to Lydden Hill. The last European Rallycross event at Lydden Hill Race Circuit was hosted in 1996. As all kind of things can change over a period of 12 years time, at least one thing didn't change ... After being declared winner of the 1996 European event at Lydden in the main Division, multiple champion Kenneth Hansen (Citroën C4) cruised to victory again in Division 1 on Easter Monday (13 April).

When ERC returned at the end of May 2010, Norwegian Sverre Isachsen (Ford Focus ST), celebrated his first victory in the European Championship as he beat multiple champion Kenneth Hansen (Citroën C4) and local guy Liam Doran (Citroën C4) in the Division 1 'A' final.

About 13,500 people spent Easter 2011 at Wootton, attending the opening round of the 2011 ERC. The victories in all three racing categories went to Norwegian drivers. Sverre Isachsen (Ford Focus Mk2) was on the highest step of the SuperCars podium on Monday afternoon. Before that, Andreas Bakkerud (Renault Clio Mk2) and Lars Øivind Enerberg (Ford Fiesta ST RWD) did the same in the Super1600 and Touring Cars classes.

There were no first qualifying heats on day 1 of the opening round of the 2012 ERC as problems with the start systems made the Clerk of the Course decide to run the first heat on Monday. Therefore, the 2012 championship started in a similar way as previous year's championship ended when at Sosnová in the Czech Republic during the final round the first heats also had to be postponed until the other day. With the absence of defending champion Sverre Isachsen the door is now open for last year's runner-up Tanner Foust (Ford Fiesta Mk7) to start the season with a victory.

The opening round of the 2013 FIA European Rallycross Championship was held over the Easter holiday, at Lydden Hill, with victory going to the American Tanner Foust in his Ford Fiesta for the second year running, only after reigning ERC champion Timur Timerzyanov for dropped back with a punctured tyre.

== World Rallycross Championship ==
In 2014, the FIA World Rallycross Championship arrived in Kent for Round Two. Ford Olsbergs MSE driver Andreas Bakkerud won, after a near perfect run. Robin Larsson claimed the runner’s-up spot in his Audi A1 Supercar, with Britain’s Andrew Jordan ending the event third in front of his home crowd.

In July 2023, the FIA World Rallycross Championship was due to race for the first time since 2017. On the eve of the first heat, The garage caught the massive blaze and the Special ONE Lancia Delta RX1e's are destroyed instantly. They had to cancel the event. Sebastien Loeb and Guerlain Chicherit had to withdraw from the championship.

== Rallycross track records ==
- (Norway) Martin Schanche, (Ford RS200 E2) drove 3 ½ laps (1 lap = 1,400 m) in 2:28.8 Minutes during the 1990 FIA ERC round
- (Norway) Sverre Isachsen, (Ford Focus T16 4X4), drove 4 laps (1 lap = 1,400 m) in 3.13.344 minutes during the 2009 FIA ERC Round

== Current events ==
- MSA British Rallycross Championship (1967-present)
- Lord of Lydden (1966-2007, 2009, 2018- present)
- Lydden Legend Festival (held biennially) - 2024, 2026

=== Past major events ===
- FIA World Rallycross Championship (2014-2017)
- FIA European Rallycross Championship
- BHP Performance Show (until 2023)
- Lydden Hill Truck Festival
- Nitro Rallycross (2021)
- Pickup Truck Racing (2022-2023, 2025)

=== Local meetings ===
- South East Motor Sport Enthusiasts Club (SEMSEC)
- Tunbridge Wells Motor Club (TWMC)
- Rochester Motor Club (RMC)
- British Automobile Racing Club (BARC)
- Vintage Motorcycle Racing Club (VMCC)
- Classic Racing Motorcycle Club (CRMC)
- Kent Outlaw Oval Racing
- Car, Bike & Drifting Trackdays

== Major race results ==
=== European rallycross ===
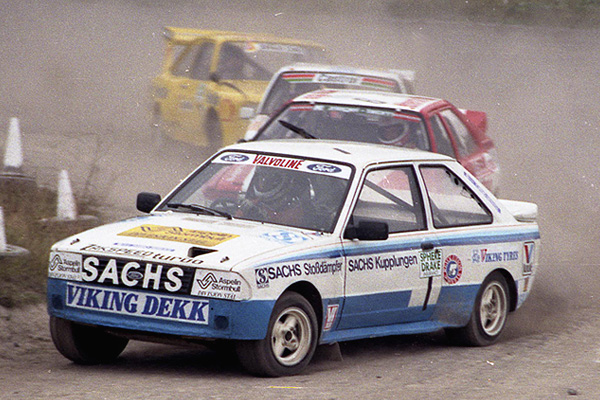
Martin Schanche (N) and his Ford Escort XR3 T16 4 x 4, Lydden 1984

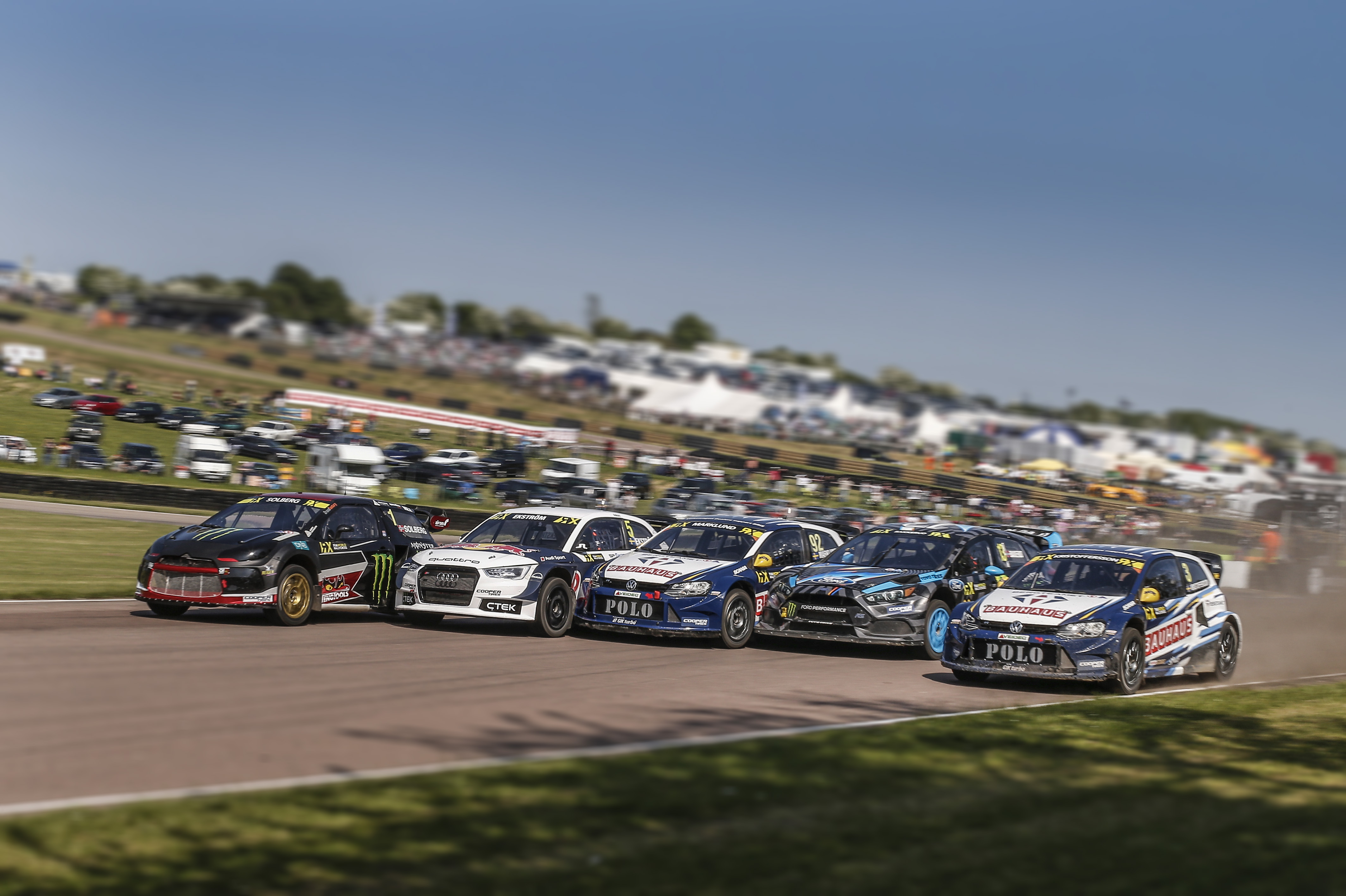
Action from the 2016 World RX of Great Britain

Year	Race	Driver	Car
1973	ERC Rd. 5	(Austria) Frank Wurz	VW 1302 S 2.2
	ERC Rd. 7	(Netherlands) Jan de Rooy	DAF 55 Coupé (Ford BDA engine)
1974	ERC Rd. 7	(Sweden) Stig Blomqvist	Saab 96 V4 1.9
	ERC Rd. 8	(United Kingdom) Tom Airey	BMC Mini Cooper S 1.4
1975	ERC Rd. 7	(United Kingdom) Tom Airey	BMC Mini Cooper S 1.4
1976	ERC Rd. 8	(Netherlands) Dick Riefel	Porsche Carrera
	ERC Rd. 10	(United Kingdom) John Taylor	Ford Escort RS1800 BDA
1978	ERC Rd. 8 GT Division	(Austria) Andy Bentza	Lancia Stratos
1979	ERC Rd. 8 GT Division	(Sweden) Olle Arnesson	Porsche Carrera
1980	ERC Rd. 9 GT Division	(Sweden) Olle Arnesson	Porsche 911 SC
1981	ERC Rd. 9 GT Division	(Finland) Matti Alamäki	Porsche SC Carrera
1982	ERC Rd. 8 Division 2	(Norway) Martin Schanche	Ford Escort RS1800 Turbo
1983	ERC Rd. 8 Division 2	(Sweden) Rolf Nilsson	Porsche SC Carrera
1984	ERC Rd. 7 Division 2	(Finland) Seppo Niittymäki	Porsche BiTurbo 4x4
1985	ERC Rd. 7 Division 2	(Norway) Martin Schanche	Ford Escort XR3 T16 4x4
1986	ERC Rd. 7 Division 2	(Finland) Seppo Niittymäki	Ford Escort XR3 T16 4x4
1987	ERC Rd. 10 Division 2	(Norway) Martin Schanche	Ford RS200 E2
1988	ERC Rd. 10 Division 2	(Norway) Martin Schanche	Ford RS200 E2
1989	ERC Rd. 10 Division 2	(Finland) Matti Alamäki	Peugeot 205 Turbo 16 E2
1990	ERC Rd. 10 Division 2	(Norway) Martin Schanche	Ford RS200 E2
1991	ERC Rd. 1 Division 2	(Norway) Martin Schanche	Ford RS200 E2
1992	ERC Rd. 1 Division 2	(Norway) Martin Schanche	Ford RS200 E2
1996	ERC Rd. 6 Division 2 +	(Sweden) Kenneth Hansen	Citroën ZX T16 4x4
2009	ERC Rd. 1 Division 1	(Sweden) Kenneth Hansen	Citroën C4 T16 4x4
2010	ERC Rd. 1 Division 1	(Norway) Sverre Isachsen	Ford Focus ST T16 4x4
2011	ERC Rd. 1 Division 1	(Norway) Sverre Isachsen	Ford Focus Mk2 T16 4x4
2012	ERC Rd. 1 Division 1	(United States) Tanner Foust	Ford Fiesta Mk7 T16 4x4
2013	ERC Rd. 1 Division 1	(United States) Tanner Foust	Ford Fiesta Mk7 T16 4x4

+ ran in conjunction with the British Rallycross Grand Prix

=== FIA World Rallycross ===
World RX layout of Lydden Hill Race Circuit, used in 2014-2017

Year	Class	Driver	Car
2014	Supercar	(Norway) Andreas Bakkerud	Ford Fiesta ST
2014	Lites Class	Mitchell deJong	Rallyx Lites
2015	Supercar	(Norway) Petter Solberg	Citroën DS3
2016	Supercar	(Sweden) Mattias Ekström	Audi S1
2017	Supercar	(Norway) Petter Solberg	Volkswagen Polo GTI
