= 2017 World RX of Great Britain =

Rallycross event

- Round 5 of 12 in the 2017 FIA World Rallycross Championship
- Date: 27–28 May 2017
- Location: Wootton, Kent
- Venue: Lydden Hill Race Circuit

Results
Heat winners
- Heat 1: (Norway) Petter Solberg; PSRX Volkswagen Sweden
- Heat 2: (Norway) Petter Solberg; PSRX Volkswagen Sweden
- Heat 3: (Norway) Petter Solberg; PSRX Volkswagen Sweden
- Heat 4: (Sweden) Timmy Hansen; Team Peugeot-Hansen
Semi-final winners
- Semi-final 1: (Norway) Petter Solberg; PSRX Volkswagen Sweden
- Semi-final 2: Johan Kristoffersson; PSRX Volkswagen Sweden
Final
- First: (Norway) Petter Solberg; PSRX Volkswagen Sweden
- Second: Johan Kristoffersson; PSRX Volkswagen Sweden
- Third: (Norway) Andreas Bakkerud; Hoonigan Racing Division

World RX layout of Lydden Hill Race Circuit

The 2017 World RX of Great Britain was the fifth round of the fourth season of the FIA World Rallycross Championship. The event was held at Lydden Hill Race Circuit in Wootton, Kent and also played host to the fourth round of the 2017 FIA European Rallycross Championship. It also hosted the second round of the 2017 RX2 International Series, the support category of the World Rallycross Championship.

Timo Scheider was absent due to racing for BMW Motorsport in the 24 Hours Nürburgring. British touring car champion Andrew Jordan replaced Scheider at MJP Racing Team Austria. This was Jordan's third appearance at the World RX of Great Britain, having previously finished third in 2014 and seventh in 2015.

== Supercar ==
=== Heats ===
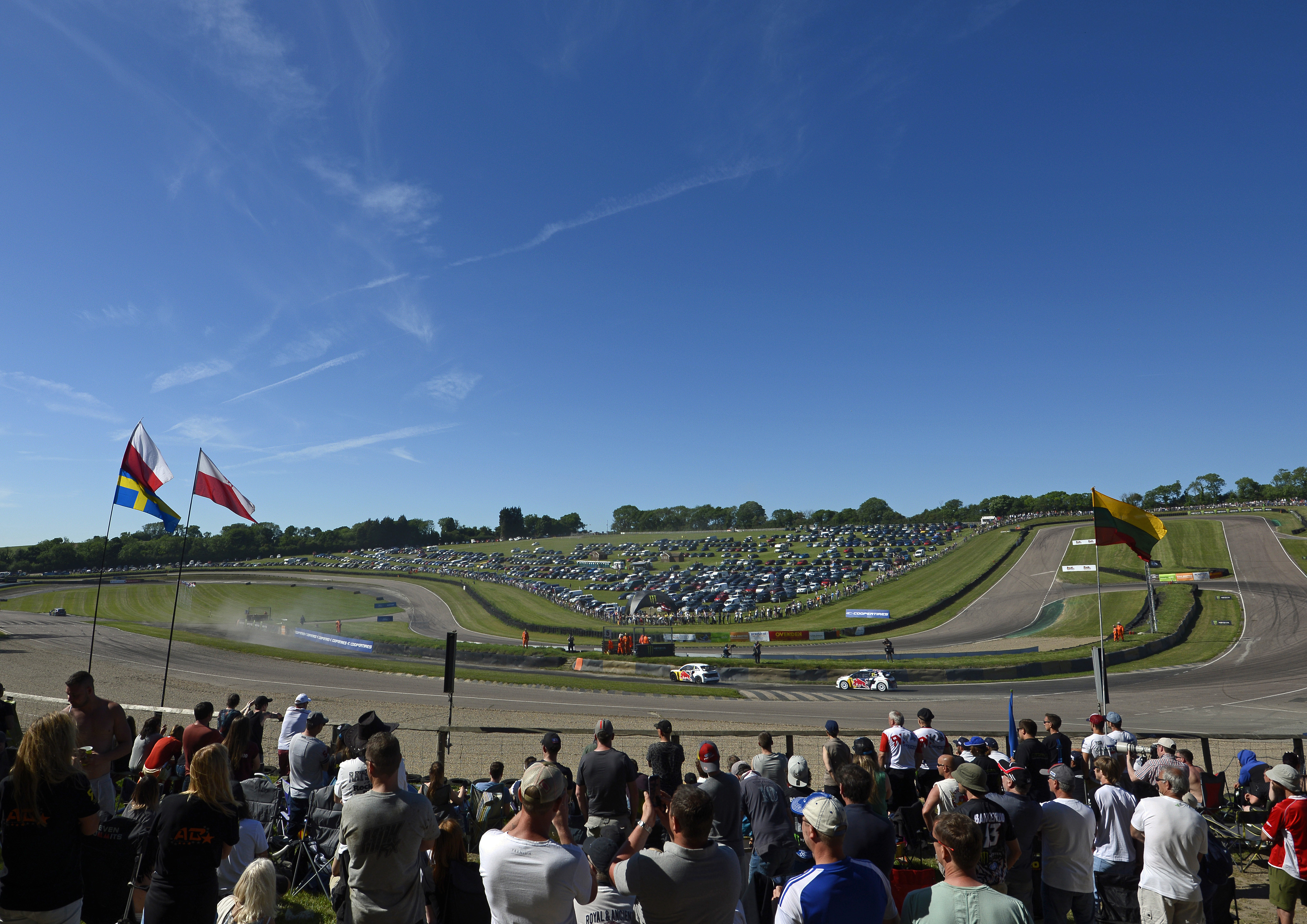
The event marked 50 years of rallycross at Lydden Hill

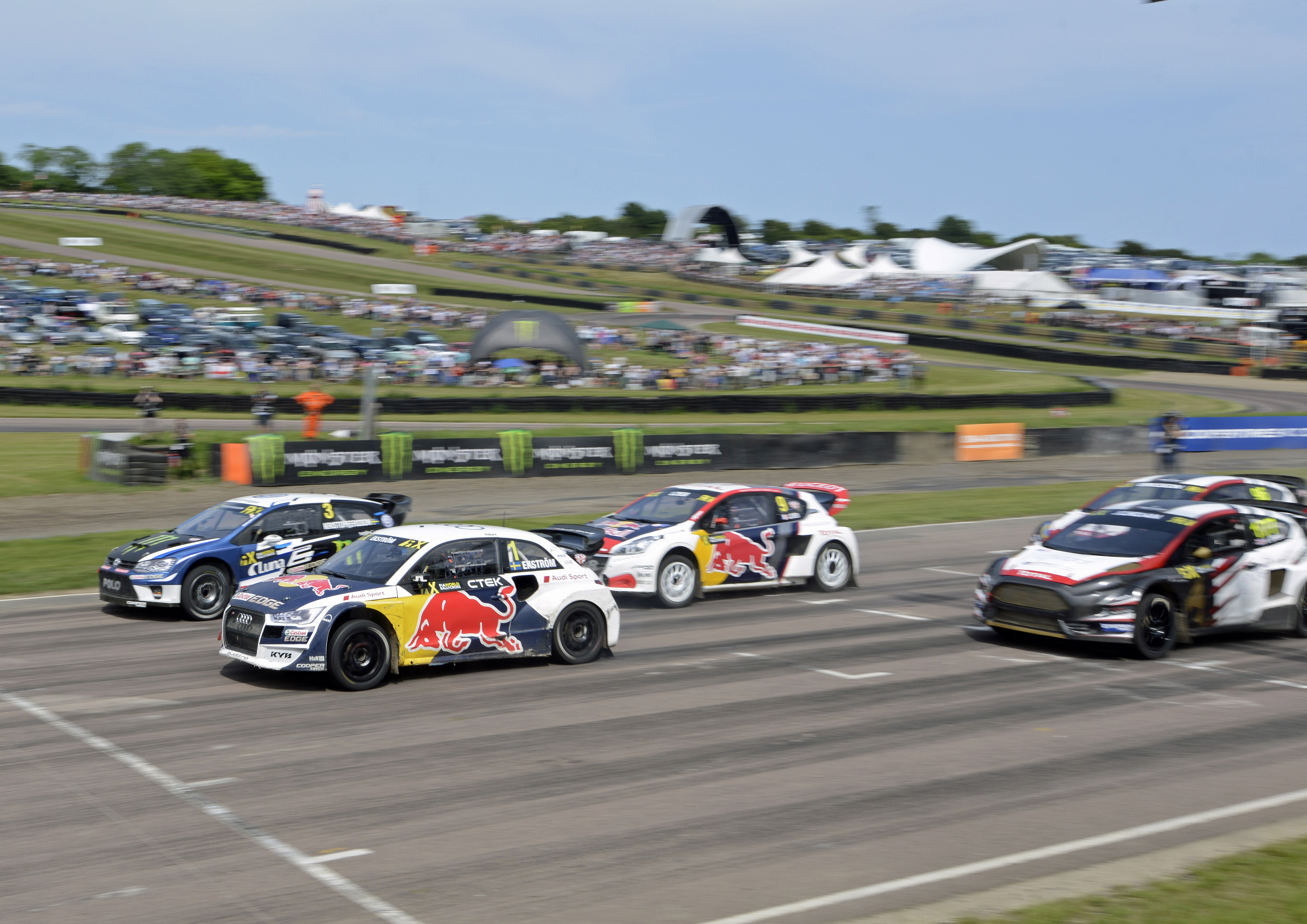
The start of Semi-Final 2

Pos.	No.	Driver	Team	Car	Q1	Q2	Q3	Q4	Pts
1	11	(Norway) Petter Solberg	PSRX Volkswagen Sweden	Volkswagen Polo GTI	1st	1st	1st	3rd	16
2	3	(Sweden) Johan Kristoffersson	PSRX Volkswagen Sweden	Volkswagen Polo GTI	2nd	2nd	2nd	2nd	15
3	21	(Sweden) Timmy Hansen	Team Peugeot-Hansen	Peugeot 208	5th	5th	7th	1st	14
4	1	(Sweden) Mattias Ekström	EKS RX	Audi S1	3rd	3rd	3rd	8th	13
5	13	(Norway) Andreas Bakkerud	Hoonigan Racing Division	Ford Focus RS	4th	4th	5th	4th	12
6	9	(France) Sébastien Loeb	Team Peugeot-Hansen	Peugeot 208	7th	6th	4th	6th	11
7	43	(United States) Ken Block	Hoonigan Racing Division	Ford Focus RS	5th	6th	7th	6th	10
8	177	(United Kingdom) Andrew Jordan	MJP Racing Team Austria	Ford Fiesta	10th	9th	18th	7th	9
9	6	(Latvia) Jānis Baumanis	STARD	Ford Fiesta	11th	11th	13th	10th	8
10	96	(Sweden) Kevin Eriksson	MJP Racing Team Austria	Ford Fiesta	9th	13th	9th	14th	7
11	7	(Russia) Timur Timerzyanov	STARD	Ford Fiesta	12th	8th	14th	12th	6
12	57	(Finland) Toomas Heikkinen	EKS RX	Audi S1	8th	22nd	8th	18th	5
13	71	(Sweden) Kevin Hansen	Team Peugeot-Hansen	Peugeot 208	13th	DNF	11th	9th	4
14	100	(United Kingdom) Guy Wilks	LOCO World RX Team	Volkswagen Polo	14th	12th	17th	15th	3
15	68	(Finland) Niclas Grönholm	GRX	Ford Fiesta	DNF	10th	12th	13th	2
16	15	(Latvia) Reinis Nitišs	EKS RX	Audi S1	23rd	DNF	10th	11th	1
17	77	(Germany) René Münnich	All-Inkl.com Münnich Motorsport	Citroën DS3	15th	14th	19th	21st	
18	87	(France) Jean-Baptiste Dubourg	DA Racing	Peugeot 208	16th	15th	15th	DNF	
19	66	(France) Grégoire Demoustier	DA Racing	Peugeot 208	19th	17th	20th	17th	
20	2	(Republic of Ireland) Oliver O'Donovan	Oliver O'Donovan	Ford Fiesta	20th	16th	16th	22nd	
21	10	(Hungary) "Csucsu"	Speedy Motorsport	Kia Rio	17th	20th	22nd	16th	
22	69	(Poland) Martin Kaczmarski	Martin Kaczmarski	Ford Fiesta	18th	18th	23rd	19th	
23	42	(United Kingdom) Oliver Bennett	Oliver Bennett	Ford Fiesta	22nd	21st	21st	20th	
24	49	(Belgium) "M.D.K."	M.D.K.	Ford Fiesta	21st	19th	DNF	23rd	

=== Semi-finals ===
Semi-final 1

Pos.	No.	Driver	Team	Time	Pts
1	11	(Norway) Petter Solberg	PSRX Volkswagen Sweden	4:11.741	6
2	13	(Norway) Andreas Bakkerud	Hoonigan Racing Division	+1.099	5
3	21	(Sweden) Timmy Hansen	Team Peugeot-Hansen	+1.402	4
4	43	(United States) Ken Block	Hoonigan Racing Division	+2.129	3
5	7	(Russia) Timur Timerzyanov	STARD	+4.478	2
6	6	(Latvia) Janis Baumanis	STARD	+6.658	1

Semi-final 2

Pos.	No.	Driver	Team	Time	Pts
1	3	(Sweden) Johan Kristoffersson	PSRX Volkswagen Sweden	4:10.922	6
2	9	(France) Sébastien Loeb	Team Peugeot-Hansen	+2.173	5
3	1	(Sweden) Mattias Ekström	EKS RX	+2.644	4
4	96	(Sweden) Kevin Eriksson	MJP Racing Team Austria	+3.708	3
5	177	(United Kingdom) Andrew Jordan	MJP Racing Team Austria	+5.379	2
6	57	(Finland) Toomas Heikkinen	EKS RX	+6.421	1

=== Final ===
Pos.	No.	Driver	Team	Time/Retired	Pts
1	11	(Norway) Petter Solberg	PSRX Volkswagen Sweden	4:09.602	8
2	3	(Sweden) Johan Kristoffersson	PSRX Volkswagen Sweden	+1.690	5
3	13	(Norway) Andreas Bakkerud	Hoonigan Racing Division	+3.317	3
4	9	(France) Sébastien Loeb	Team Peugeot-Hansen	+6.730	4
5	1	(Sweden) Mattias Ekström	EKS RX	+14.156	2
6	21	(Sweden) Timmy Hansen	Team Peugeot-Hansen	+58.200	1

== RX2 International Series ==
=== Heats ===
Pos.	No.	Driver	Team	Q1	Q2	Q3	Q4	Pts
1	13	(France) Cyril Raymond	Olsbergs MSE	1st	1st	1st	1st	16
2	40	(United Kingdom) Dan Rooke	Dan Rooke	2nd	2nd	2nd	2nd	15
3	96	(Belgium) Guillaume De Ridder	Guillaume De Ridder	4th	4th	5th	8th	14
4	11	(United States) Tanner Whitten	Olsbergs MSE	7th	3rd	3rd	13th	13
5	9	(Norway) Glenn Haug	Glenn Haug	11th	5th	9th	4th	12
6	69	(Norway) Sondre Evjen	JC Raceteknik	6th	6th	8th	9th	11
7	52	(Sweden) Simon Olofsson	Simon Olofsson	15th	7th	4th	5th	10
8	56	(Norway) Thomas Holmen	Bard Holmen	10th	10th	11th	3rd	9
9	66	(Sweden) William Nilsson	JC Raceteknik	3rd	8th	15th	10th	8
10	55	(Latvia) Vasily Gryazin	Sports Racing Technologies	8th	11th	12th	6th	7
11	12	(Sweden) Anders Michalak	Anders Michalak	5th	DNF	6th	14th	6
12	8	(Norway) Simon Wågø Syversen	Set Promotion	12th	9th	7th	15th	5
13	26	(Sweden) Jessica Bäckman	Olsbergs MSE	9th	14th	10th	12th	4
14	19	(Sweden) Andreas Bäckman	Olsbergs MSE	14th	12th	14th	7th	3
15	51	(Sweden) Sandra Hultgren	Sandra Hultgren	13th	13th	13th	11th	2

=== Semi-finals ===
Semi-final 1

Pos.	No.	Driver	Team	Time/Retired	Pts
1	13	(France) Cyril Raymond	Olsbergs MSE	4:36.091	6
2	96	(Belgium) Guillaume De Ridder	Guillaume De Ridder	+2.147	5
3	52	(Sweden) Simon Olofsson	Simon Olofsson	+3.987	4
4	66	(Sweden) William Nilsson	JC Raceteknik	+4.229	3
5	9	(Norway) Glenn Haug	Glenn Haug	+5.496	2
6	12	(Sweden) Anders Michalak	Anders Michalak	DNF	1

Semi-final 2

Pos.	No.	Driver	Team	Time	Pts
1	40	(United Kingdom) Dan Rooke	Dan Rooke	4:39.483	6
2	56	(Norway) Thomas Holmen	Bard Holmen	+0.398	5
3	11	(Norway) Sondre Evjen	JC Raceteknik	+1.318	4
4	11	(United States) Tanner Whitten	Olsbergs MSE	+1.774	3
5	8	(Norway) Simon Wågø Syversen	Set Promotion	+3.060	2
6	55	(Latvia) Vasily Gryazin	Sports Racing Technologies	+3.754	1

=== Final ===
Pos.	No.	Driver	Team	Time/Retired	Pts
1	13	(France) Cyril Raymond	Olsbergs MSE	4:37.080	8
2	40	(United Kingdom) Dan Rooke	Dan Rooke	+1.098	5
3	56	(Norway) Thomas Holmen	Bard Holmen	+1.691	4
4	96	(Belgium) Guillaume De Ridder	Guillaume De Ridder	+2.379	3
5	69	(Norway) Sondre Evjen	JC Raceteknik	+3.368	2
6	52	(Sweden) Simon Olofsson	Simon Olofsson	+4.642	1

== Standings after the event ==
Supercar standings

Pos	Driver	Pts	Gap
1	(Sweden) Johan Kristoffersson	124	
2	(Sweden) Mattias Ekström	120	+4
3	(Norway) Petter Solberg	117	+7
4	(Sweden) Timmy Hansen	91	+33
5	(France) Sébastien Loeb	81	+43

RX2 standings

Pos	Driver	Pts	Gap
1	(France) Cyril Raymond	55	
2	(United Kingdom) Dan Rooke	51	+4
3	(Sweden) Simon Olofsson	39	+16
4	(Belgium) Guillaume De Ridder	35	+20
5	(Norway) Glenn Haug	34	+21

- Note: Only the top five positions are included.

Previous race: 2017 World RX of Belgium	FIA World Rallycross Championship; 2017 season	Next race: 2017 World RX of Norway
Previous race: 2016 World RX of Great Britain	World RX of Great Britain	Next race: 2018 World RX of Great Britain
