= Pat Doran =

British rallycross driver (b.1959)

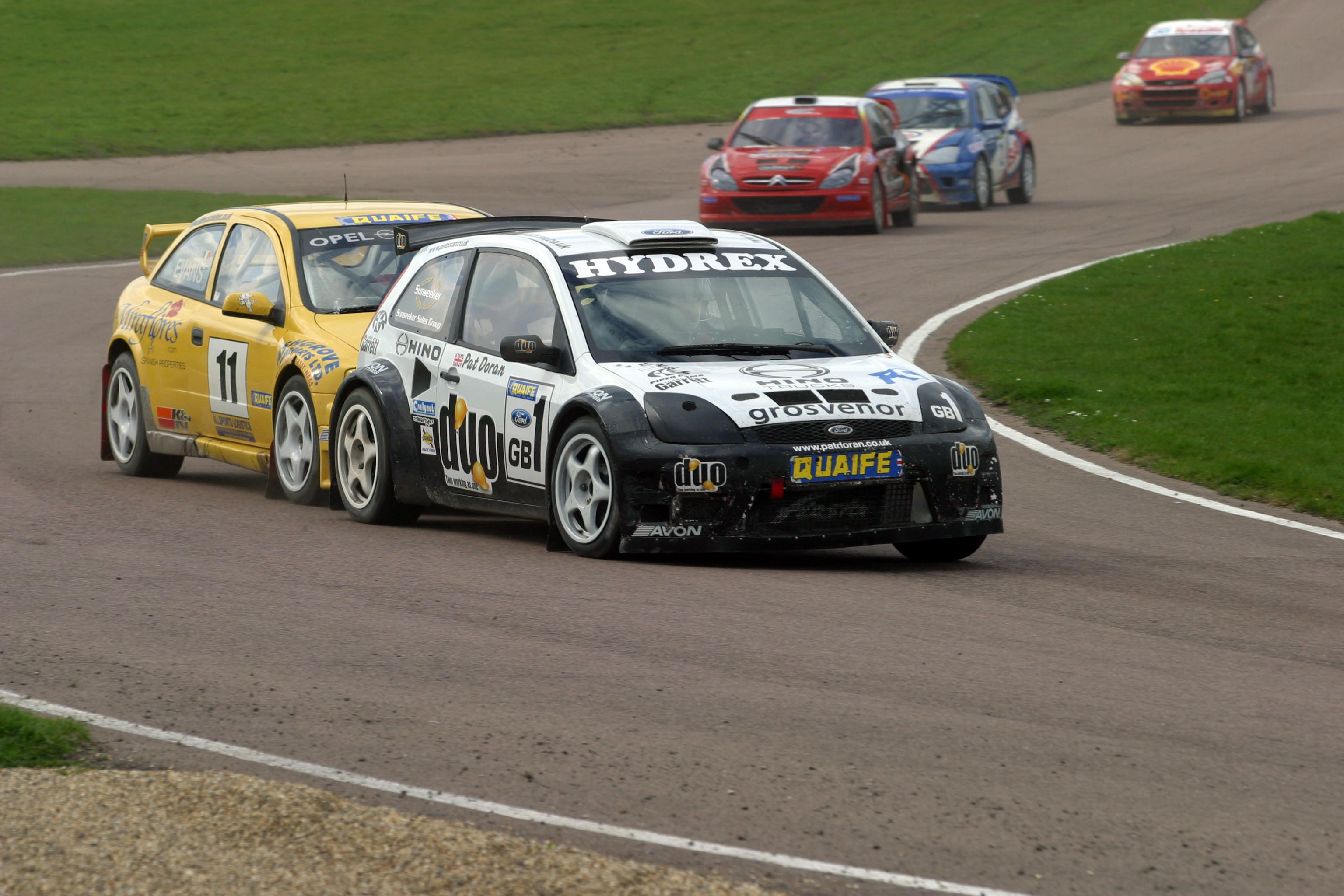
- Pat Doran in 2006 British Rallycross Championship
- Nationality: (United Kingdom) British
- Born: Patrick Doran; 5 June 1959 (age 67)
- Relatives: Liam Doran (son)

FIA European Rallycross Championship
- Years active: 1991–1993, 2007–2011, 2013
- Starts: 40
- Wins: 1
- Podiums: 7
- Best finish: 2nd in 1992 (Division 2)

Previous series
- British Rallycross Championship

Championship titles
- 4 times: British Rallycross Championship

Patrick Doran (born 5 June 1959) is a British rallycross driver of Irish origin, living in Thorverton, Devon. His oldest son, Liam Doran, became a rallycross driver too.

Doran, sometimes nicknamed "Plastic Paddy", is a former four-time British Rallycross Champion. Doran was also the runner-up in the European Rallycross Championship in 1992, behind Will Gollop, also from Great Britain. He also raced a Ford RS200 in the Pikes Peak International Hill Climb.

Calling Lydden Hill Race Circuit his home, in 2008 he became the owner of the Kentish motorsports venue.

== Racing record ==
=== FIA European Rallycross Championship results ===
==== Division 2 ====
Year	Entrant	Car	1	2	3	4	5	6	7	8	9	10	11	ERX	Points
1991	Pat Doran	Ford RS200 E2	POR	AUT	FIN	FRA	IRE	SWE	BEL; 10	NED; 6	NOR; 6	GBR; 2	GER	11th	46
1992	Pat Doran	Ford RS200 E2	GBR; 3	AUT	POR (NC)	FIN; 3	SWE; 6	FRA; 1	IRE; 2	BEL (NC)	NED; 4	NOR (10)	GER; 6	2nd	102
1993	Pat Doran	Ford Escort RS Cosworth	AUT	POR	FRA; 3	IRE (NC)	SWE; 5	FIN; 3	BEL; 12	NED; 12	NOR; 5	GER; 11		8th	70

==== Division 1 ====
Year	Entrant	Car	1	2	3	4	5	6	7	8	9	10	11	ERX	Points
2007	Pat Doran	Ford Fiesta ST T16	POR	FRA	HUN	AUT	SWE	NOR	BEL; 13	NED; NC	POL	CZE		31st	4
2008	Pat Doran	Ford Fiesta ST T16	POR	FRA	HUN; NC	AUT; NC	NOR; NC	SWE; NC	BEL (NC)	NED; 11	CZE; 12	POL; NC	GER; NC	24th	11
2009	Pat Doran	Ford Fiesta ST T16	GBR; 8	POR	FRA	HUN	AUT	SWE	BEL	GER	POL	CZE		26th	9
2010	Pat Doran	Ford Fiesta ST T16	POR	FRA	GBR; 10	HUN	SWE; 20	FIN	BEL	GER	POL	CZE; 12		25th	12

==== Supercar ====
Year	Entrant	Car	1	2	3	4	5	6	7	8	9	10	ERX	Points
2011	Pat Doran	Ford Focus	GBR; 13	POR	FRA	NOR	SWE	BEL	NED	AUT			28th	8
2011	Pat Doran	Citroën C4									POL; 13	CZE	28th	8
2013	Pat Doran	Citroën DS3	GBR; 18	POR	HUN	FIN	NOR	SWE	FRA	AUT	GER		45th	0
