= Guerlain Chicherit =

French rally and rallycross driver and professional skier

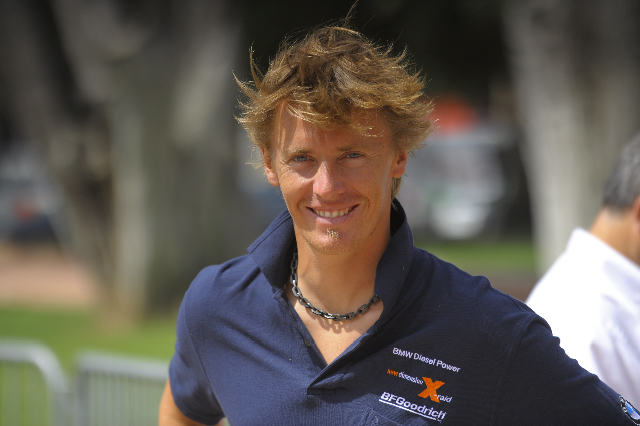
- Guerlain Chicherit
- Nationality: French
- Born: Guerlain Patrice Michel Chicherit; 20 May 1978 (age 48) Tignes, France

FIA World Rallycross Championship career
- Debut season: 2015
- Current team: GC Kompetition
- Car number: 36
- Former teams: Fors Performance; JRM Racing
- Starts: 44
- Wins: 0
- Podiums: 0
- Best finish: 10th in 2022, 2023
- Finished last season: 10th

Guerlain Patrice Michel Chicherit (born 20 May 1978 in Paris) is a French rally and rallycross driver, and a professional skier who was a four-time world champion in freeriding (1999, 2002, 2006 and 2007).

== Biography ==
Chicherit made his professional motorsport debut in the French Rally Cup driving a Citroën Saxo, and after a successful season in 2003, he became an official Citroën driver. In 2006, after winning the 2005 Dakar Challenge, he attended his first Dakar Rally, driving a BMW X3, and won a stage on his way to finishing ninth in the final classification.

In the 2009 Dakar Rally, Chicherit suffered an accident while fighting in the general classification, and finished ninth.

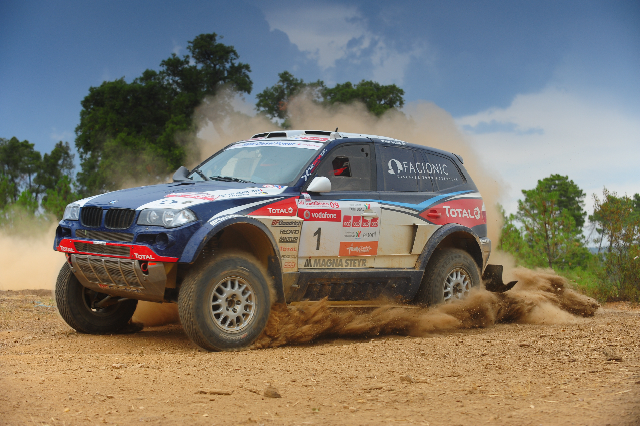
Guerlain Chicherit, driving the BMW X-Raid 2009

Later that year, after achieving a great series of results including a third place in the Tunisia Rally and wins on Rally Transibérico and UAE Desert Challenge, Chicherit won the FIA Cross Country Rally World Cup with co-driver Tina Thörner.

In the 2010 Dakar Rally, Chicherit was able to get another stage win and finish fifth in the final classification with an X-Raid BMW.

In the 2013 Dakar Rally, Chicherit won a stage and finished eighth overall driving an SMG buggy. In 2013, he also became the first driver to complete an unassisted backflip in a car.

In March 2014, Chicherit tried to break the world record for the longest car jump in Tignes, France. He crashed spectacularly on landing (which became a viral video on YouTube), but only suffered relatively minor injuries.

In August 2015, Chicherit joined JRM Racing for two events in the FIA World Rallycross Championship driving the MINI RX in the Supercar class in Loheac, France, and Franciacorta, Italy.

In 2016, Chicherit again tackled the Dakar Rally, driving an X-Raid Buggy but retiring on medical grounds following a steering related issue during SS5. 2016 also saw Chicherit rejoin the FIA World Rallycross Championship, replacing Monster Energy athlete Liam Doran at JRM Racing, with the latter being fired following the Gatebil incident. He contested events in France, Barcelona and Germany. However, a non-start for Chicherit in Loheac meant he also entered the first ever event in Riga, Latvia.

Chicherit announced plans to form his own team, GC Kompetition, driving a pair of Renault Mégane RS RXs in the 2018 FIA World Rallycross Championship. The team got a podium in its first season through Jérôme Grosset-Janin in Holjes.

2019 saw Guerlain and GC Kompetition continue its involvement in the FIA World Rallycross Championship, growing to a five car team by the end of the season - with three Renault Mégane RS RXs, and a pair of Renault Clio RS RXs making up the new GCK Academy team. Guerlain had his strongest season yet, threatening the top of the timesheets on a regular basis and sealing his best ever finish with fourth in Canada despite suffering mechanical issues in the final.

Away from sports, Chicherit is involved in property development. He has his own company, GC Kollection, which designs and builds chalets in the Alps. Guerlain has many other business ventures including GCK Energy, which won the FIA tender to power the upcoming electrification of the FIA World Rallycross Championship.

== Racing record ==
=== Dakar Rally results ===
(key)

Year	Vehicle	Position	Stages won
2005	Nissan	49th	0
2006	BMW X3	9th	1
2007	X-Raid BMW	Ret.	0
2009	X-Raid BMW	9th	0
2010	X-Raid BMW	5th	1
2011	X-Raid Mini	Ret.	0
2013	SMG buggy	8th	1
2014	SMG buggy	Ret.	0
2015	X-Raid buggy	45th	0
2016	X-Raid buggy	Ret.	0
2022	GCK Thunder buggy	Ret.	0
2023	Prodrive BRX Hunter	10th	2
2024	Toyota Hilux Overdrive	4th	2
2025	MINI JCW Rally 3.0i		

=== Complete FIA World Rallycross Championship results ===
(key)

==== Supercar/RX1/RX1e ====
Year	Entrant	Car	1	2	3	4	5	6	7	8	9	10	11	12	13	WRX	Points
2015	JRM Racing	MINI RX Countryman	POR	HOC	BEL	GBR	GER	SWE	CAN	NOR	FRA; 28	BAR	TUR	ITA; 16	ARG	34th	1
2016	JRM Racing	MINI RX Countryman	POR	HOC	BEL	GBR	NOR	SWE	CAN	FRA; 31	BAR; 20	LAT; 21	GER; 21	ARG		26th	0
2017	Fors Performance	Renault Clio IV	BAR; 21	POR	HOC; 21	BEL; 20	GBR	NOR; 19	SWE	CAN	FRA	LAT	GER	RSA		32nd	0
2018	GC Kompetition	Renault Mégane RS RX	BAR; 12	POR; 5	BEL; 12	GBR; 15	NOR; 15	SWE; 14	CAN; 15	FRA; 12	LAT; 10	USA; 9	GER; 13	RSA; 12		11th	68
2019	GC Kompetition	Renault Mégane RS RX	UAE; 8	BAR; 9	BEL; 13	GBR; 7	NOR; 10	SWE; 14	CAN; 4	FRA; 13	LAT; 15	RSA; 7				12th	73
2020	GCK UNKORRUPTED	Renault Clio R.S. RX	SWE; 16	SWE; 13	FIN; 14	FIN; 15	LAT; 15	LAT; 15	ESP	ESP						17th	14
2021	Unkorrupted	Renault Mégane R.S.	BAR	SWE	FRA	LAT	LAT	BEL	PRT	GER; 7	GER; 5					14th	27
2022	Guerlain Chicherit	Lancia Delta Evo-e RX	NOR	LAT	LAT	POR	POR	BEL	BEL	ESP	ESP	GER; 9				10th	7
2023	Special ONE Racing	Lancia Delta Evo-E RX	POR; 8	NOR; 7	SWE; 6	GBR; C	BLX	GER	RSA	RSA	CHN	CHN				10th	27

==== RX2 International Series ====
Year	Entrant	Car	1	2	3	4	5	6	7	RX2	Points
2017	Olsbergs MSE	RX2	BEL	GBR	NOR	SWE	CAN; 15	FRA	RSA; 12	20th	8

=== Complete World Rally-Raid Championship results ===
(key)

Year	Team	Car	Class	1	2	3	4	5	Pos.	Points
2022	GCK Motorsport	Buggy GCK Thunder	T1	DAK; Ret	ABU	MOR	AND		6th	48
2022	GCK Motorsport	BRX Hunter T1+	T1	DAK	ABU	MOR; 1^{30}	AND		6th	48
2023	Overdrive Racing	Toyota Hilux Overdrive	T1	DAK; 7^{49}	ABU; Ret	SON; 21^{6}	DES	MOR	9th	55
2024	Overdrive Racing	Toyota Hilux Overdrive	T1U	DAK; 4^{56}	ABU; Ret^{8}	PRT; Ret^{5}	DES	MOR; Ret	7th	69
