= 2022 FIA World Rallycross Championship =

Auto racing championship

The 2022 FIA World Rallycross Championship was the ninth season of the FIA World Rallycross Championship, an auto racing championship recognized by the Fédération Internationale de l'Automobile (FIA) as the highest class of international rallycross.

Johan Kristoffersson won the drivers' championship for the third consecutive year, his fifth title overall. Kristoffersson Motorsport won the teams' championship for the first time under that name.

== Calendar ==
On 15 December 2021, the provisional 2022 calendar was announced during the FIA World Motorsport Council decisions: The updated calendar was released on 21 March. It included one unconfirmed event. The calendar was updated again on 29 June on the FIA World Motorsport Council, in which World RX of Sweden was cancelled for RX1e, and World RX of Catalunya returned to the calendar provisionally. Another calendar update was announced on 7 July. The World RX of Germany was postponed to allow RX1e teams more time to prepare for the season.

Rnd	Event	Date	Venue	Class	Winner	Team	Report
1	Cooper Tires Rallycross of Sweden	2–3 July	Höljesbanan, Höljes	RX2e	(Belgium) Viktor Vranckx	(Belgium) Bert Vranckx	Report
2	Ramudden World RX of Norway	13–14 August	Lånkebanen, Hell	RX1e	(Sweden) Johan Kristoffersson	(Sweden) Kristoffersson Motorsport	Report
2	Ramudden World RX of Norway	13–14 August	Lånkebanen, Hell	RX2e	(Belgium) Viktor Vranckx	(Belgium) Bert Vranckx	Report
3	Ferratum World RX of Rīga-Latvia	3–4 September	Biķernieku Kompleksā Sporta Bāze, Riga	RX1e	(Sweden) Johan Kristoffersson	(Sweden) Kristoffersson Motorsport	Report
4	Ferratum World RX of Rīga-Latvia	3–4 September	Biķernieku Kompleksā Sporta Bāze, Riga	RX1e	(Sweden) Johan Kristoffersson	(Sweden) Kristoffersson Motorsport	Report
4	Ferratum World RX of Rīga-Latvia	3–4 September	Biķernieku Kompleksā Sporta Bāze, Riga	RX2e	(United Kingdom) Patrick O'Donovan	(United Kingdom) Patrick O'Donovan	Report
5	Lusorecursos World RX of Portugal	17–18 September	Pista Automóvel de Montalegre, Montalegre	RX1e	(Sweden) Johan Kristoffersson	(Sweden) Kristoffersson Motorsport	Report
6	Lusorecursos World RX of Portugal	17–18 September	Pista Automóvel de Montalegre, Montalegre	RX1e	(Finland) Niclas Grönholm	(Sweden) Construction Equipment Dealer Team	Report
7	(Belgium) Benelux World RX of Spa-Francorchamps	8–9 October	Circuit de Spa-Francorchamps, Stavelot	RX1e	(Sweden) Johan Kristoffersson	(Sweden) Kristoffersson Motorsport	Report
8	(Belgium) Benelux World RX of Spa-Francorchamps	8–9 October	Circuit de Spa-Francorchamps, Stavelot	RX1e	(Sweden) Johan Kristoffersson	(Sweden) Kristoffersson Motorsport	Report
8	(Belgium) Benelux World RX of Spa-Francorchamps	8–9 October	Circuit de Spa-Francorchamps, Stavelot	RX2e	(United Kingdom) Patrick O'Donovan	(United Kingdom) Patrick O'Donovan	Report
9	(Spain) World RX of Catalunya	29–30 October	Circuit de Barcelona-Catalunya, Montmeló	RX1e	(Sweden) Timmy Hansen	(Sweden) Hansen World RX Team	Report
10	(Spain) World RX of Catalunya	29–30 October	Circuit de Barcelona-Catalunya, Montmeló	RX1e	(Sweden) Johan Kristoffersson	(Sweden) Kristoffersson Motorsport	Report
10	(Spain) World RX of Catalunya	29–30 October	Circuit de Barcelona-Catalunya, Montmeló	RX2e	(Sweden) Isak Sjökvist	(Sweden) Isak Sjökvist	Report
11	World RX of Germany	12–13 November	Nürburgring, Nürburg	RX1e	(Sweden) Johan Kristoffersson	(Sweden) Kristoffersson Motorsport	Report

=== Calendar Changes ===
- World RX of Sweden was listed as the opening round of World Rallycross Championship. A further update was issued in March, with Holjes becoming an official launch event headlined by the Euro RX1 series for combustion-powered supercars. The World RallyCross Championship's electric era started at Norway's Hell track on 13-14 August after delays to allow teams to ready their new cars.

== Series News ==
- For the first time in world rallycross history all the categories were based on electric power.
- The RX1 class was discontinued. It was replaced by the electric RX1e class. While bodywork and liveries were different, all cars in this new class used the same powertrain developed by Kreisel Electric.
- A new race weekend format was adopted for the 2022 season. The grids for heat 1 were set using a single-lap shootout SuperPole session immediately following practice. Single header events featured three heat races (down from four), and double header events featured two heat races (down from three). The grids for the heats following heat 1 were set by finishing position in the previous heat, rather than overall time. The positions per heat were determined by time. Following the heat races a 'Progression' race determined which ten drivers moved on to the semi-finals. From the semi-finals, the top 2 drivers from each semi moved on to the final, along with the highest-placed driver finishing in third. The staggered grid for the semi-finals and finals was removed in favor of a side-by-side grid. There was a maximum of five cars competing in every race.

== Entries ==
=== RX1e ===
Constructor (Note: All the cars in the 2022 FIA World Rallycross Championship are powered by the same electric powertrain developed by Kreisel Electric.)	Team	Model	No.	Drivers	Rounds	Ref
GCK Exclusiv-e	(France) Guerlain Chicherit	Lancia Delta Evo-e RX	36	(France) Guerlain Chicherit	11	
Peugeot	(Sweden) Hansen World RX Team	Peugeot 208 RX1e	21	(Sweden) Timmy Hansen	All	
Peugeot	(Sweden) Hansen World RX Team	Peugeot 208 RX1e	71	(Sweden) Kevin Hansen	All	
PWR Racing	(Sweden) Construction Equipment Dealer Team	PWR RX1e	12	(Sweden) Klara Andersson	All	
PWR Racing	(Sweden) Construction Equipment Dealer Team	PWR RX1e	68	(Finland) Niclas Grönholm	All	
Volkswagen	(Sweden) Kristoffersson Motorsport	Volkswagen Polo RX1e	1	(Sweden) Johan Kristoffersson	All	
Volkswagen	(Sweden) Kristoffersson Motorsport	Volkswagen Polo RX1e	52	(Norway) Ole Christian Veiby	All	
Volkswagen	(Sweden) Gustav Bergström	Volkswagen Polo RX1e	17	(Sweden) Gustav Bergström	All	
SEAT	(Germany) ALL-INKL.COM Münnich Motorsport	SEAT Ibiza RX1e	77	(Germany) René Münnich	1–10	
SEAT	(Germany) ALL-INKL.COM Münnich Motorsport	SEAT Ibiza RX1e	92	(Sweden) Anton Marklund	11	

=== RX2e ===
Constructor	Team	Car	No.	Drivers	Rounds	Ref
QEV Technologies	(United Kingdom) Patrick O'Donovan	ZEROID X1	00	(United Kingdom) Patrick O'Donovan (Note: Patrick O'Donovan is an Irish driver competing under a British license.)	All	
QEV Technologies	(United Kingdom) Catie Munnings	ZEROID X1	3	(United Kingdom) Catie Munnings	1	
QEV Technologies	(Spain) QEV Motorsport	ZEROID X1	5	(Spain) Pablo Suárez	All	
QEV Technologies	(Spain) QEV Motorsport	ZEROID X1	7	(Spain) Carlos Checa Carrera	5	
QEV Technologies	(Spain) QEV Motorsport	ZEROID X1	23	(Germany) Nick Heidfeld	5	
QEV Technologies	(Spain) QEV Motorsport	ZEROID X1	26	(Latvia) Roberts Vitols	3	
QEV Technologies	(Spain) QEV Motorsport	ZEROID X1	28	(Sweden) Filip Thorén	1, 3	
QEV Technologies	(Spain) QEV Motorsport	ZEROID X1	34	(South Africa) Lance Woolridge	2	
QEV Technologies	(Norway) Aksel Lund Svindal	ZEROID X1	9	(Norway) Aksel Lund Svindal	2	
QEV Technologies	(Spain) Escuderia Mollerussa	ZEROID X1	12	(Spain) Pepe Arqué	5	
QEV Technologies	(Belgium) Bert Vranckx	ZEROID X1	13	(Belgium) Viktor Vranckx	All	
QEV Technologies	(Sweden) Kristoffersson Motorsport	ZEROID X1	14	(Sweden) Nils Andersson	All	
QEV Technologies	(Spain) Acciona Sainz XE Team	ZEROID X1	44	(Spain) Laia Sanz	1–2, 5	
QEV Technologies	(United Kingdom) Mark Flaherty	ZEROID X1	77	(United Kingdom) Mark Flaherty	1–2	
QEV Technologies	(Sweden) Isak Sjökvist	ZEROID X1	82	(Sweden) Isak Sjökvist	All	
QEV Technologies	(Andorra) ACA Esport	ZEROID X1	97	(Andorra) Raul Ferre	All	

== Championship standings ==
Points are scored as follows:

Position	1st	2nd	3rd	4th	5th	6th	7th	8th	9th	10th	11th	12th	13th	14th	15th
Points	20	16	13	12	11	10	9	8	7	6	5	4	3	2	1

=== RX1e Driver's Championship ===
Pos.	Driver	NOR (Norway)	LVA (Latvia)		PRT (Portugal)		BEL (Belgium)		CAT (Spain)		DEU (Germany)	Points
1	(Sweden) Johan Kristoffersson	1	1	1	1	5	1	1	4	1	1	183
2	(Sweden) Timmy Hansen	2	3	4	3	4	4	7	1	2	3	136
3	(Finland) Niclas Grönholm	5	7	5	7	1	5	2	2	5	2	130
4	(Norway) Ole Christian Veiby	3	4	3	2	2	8	5	6	3	4	124
5	(Sweden) Kevin Hansen	7	2	2	4	7	2	4	5	6	5	122
6	(Sweden) Gustav Bergström	6	5	6	5	8	3	3	3	7	7	107
7	(Sweden) Klara Andersson	4	8	7	6	3	7	6	7	4	6	102
8	(Germany) René Münnich	8	6	8	8	6	6	8	8	8		78
9	(Sweden) Anton Marklund										8	8
10	(France) Guerlain Chicherit										9	7
Pos.	Driver	NOR (Norway)	LVA (Latvia)		PRT (Portugal)		BEL (Belgium)		CAT (Spain)		DEU (Germany)	Points

=== RX1e Team's Championship ===
Pos.	Driver	No.	NOR (Norway)	LVA (Latvia)		PRT (Portugal)		BEL (Belgium)		CAT (Spain)		DEU (Germany)	Points
1	(Sweden) Kristoffersson Motorsport	1	1	1	1	1	5	1	1	5	1	1	306
1	(Sweden) Kristoffersson Motorsport	52	3	4	3	2	2	8	5	6	3	4	306
2	(Sweden) Hansen World RX Team	21	2	3	4	3	4	5	7	1	2	3	259
2	(Sweden) Hansen World RX Team	71	7	2	2	4	7	2	4	4	6	5	259
3	(Sweden) Construction Equipment Dealer Team	12	4	8	7	6	3	7	6	7	4	6	232
3	(Sweden) Construction Equipment Dealer Team	68	5	7	5	7	1	4	2	2	5	2	232
Pos.	Driver		NOR (Norway)	LVA (Latvia)		PRT (Portugal)		BEL (Belgium)		CAT (Spain)		DEU (Germany)	Points

=== RX2e Driver's Championship ===
Pos.	Driver	SWE (Sweden)	NOR (Norway)	LVA (Latvia)	BEL (Belgium)	CAT (Spain)	Points
1	(Belgium) Viktor Vranckx	1	1 (Note: Viktor Vranckx was penalized 2 championship points.)	3	2	2	83
2	(Sweden) Isak Sjökvist	3	3	2	5	1	73
3	(Sweden) Nils Andersson	2	2	6	6	3	65
4	(United Kingdom) Patrick O'Donovan	9 (Note: Patrick O'Donovan was penalized 1 championship point.)	6 (Note: Patrick O'Donovan was penalized 5 championship points.)	1	1	7	60
5	(Andorra) Raul Ferre	4	4	5	4	5	58
6	(Spain) Pablo Suárez	5	5	7	3	4	56
7	(Sweden) Filip Thorén	6		8	7		27
8	(Spain) Laia Sanz	7	8			8	25
9	(Latvia) Roberts Vitols			4			12
10	(United Kingdom) Mark Flaherty	10 (Note: Mark Flaherty was penalized 1 championship point.)	10				11
11	(Spain) Pepe Arqué					6	10
13	(South Africa) Lance Woolridge		7				9
13	(United Kingdom) Catie Munnings	8					8
14	(Norway) Aksel Lund Svindal		9				7
15	(Spain) Carlos Checa Carrera					9	7
16	(Germany) Nick Heidfeld					10	6
Pos.	Driver	SWE (Sweden)	NOR (Norway)	LVA (Latvia)	BEL (Belgium)	CAT (Spain)	Points
