= Klara Andersson =

Swedish rallycross driver

- Nationality: (Sweden) Swedish
- Born: Klara Augusta Linnéa Andersson; 29 February 2000 (age 26) Löberöd, Sweden
- Relatives: Magda Andersson (sister)

FIA World Rallycross Championship career
- Debut season: 2022
- Current team: Construction Equipment Dealer Team
- Car number: 12
- Starts: 23
- Wins: 0
- Podiums: 3
- Best finish: 7th in 2022, 2023

Championship titles
- 2021: Swedish Rallycross Championship - SM 2150

Klara Augusta Linnéa Andersson (born 29 February 2000) is a Swedish rallycross driver who currently competes in the FIA World Rallycross Championship for the CE Dealer Team.

She is the younger sister of former FIA European Rallycross Championship event winner Magda Andersson. Her father, Håkan, formerly competed in the Swedish Rallycross Championship for Volvo and BMW.

== Biography ==
A member of the Sweden Junior National Team of Motorsport, Andersson started her career in karting before switching to rallycross in 2018 after a five-year hiatus. She made her way up the national motorsport scene, including a wildcard appearance at the 2019 RallyX Nordic season finale, and finished runner-up in the JSM (Junior) class of the 2020 Swedish Rallycross Championship, driving a BMW 120. The following year she made the step up to the SM (Senior) 2150 class, unexpectedly winning the title in her first season in a field that consisted of more than 50 drivers.

After impressing in the FIA RX2e Championship, where she achieved a best finish of 4th at Spa-Francorchamps from two rounds, and in the Extreme E rookie test, Andersson was signed by Xite Energy Racing to partner team owner Oliver Bennett for the 2022 Extreme E season. However, she contracted COVID-19 shortly before the opening round in Saudi Arabia and was replaced by the championship's female reserve driver Tamara Molinaro. Molinaro was eventually retained by the team, with Andersson taking her place as reserve. The Swede would make her long-awaited Extreme E debut in September at the fourth event of the season, the Copper X-Prix in Chile, standing in for Jutta Kleinschmidt, who injured herself during free practice, at Abt Cupra XE. Together with Dakar Rally legend Nasser Al-Attiyah, Andersson took third place, thus achieving a podium finish on debut. Andersson joined SUN Minimeal Team for the 2024 season as Abt Cupra XE left the series. On 6 September, a week before the scheduled Island X-Prix, Extreme E announced that the rounds in Sardinia and Phoenix were cancelled.

In May 2022, it was announced that Andersson would join Niclas Grönholm at the Construction Equipment Dealer Team in RX1e, the top class of the 2022 FIA World Rallycross Championship, in what became the first full-season gender equal line-up of the championship. She made history in round 5 of the season in Portugal by becoming the first ever woman to step on a top-flight rallycross podium.

In September 2025, Carl Cox Motorsport officially entered the FIA Extreme H World Cup with Timo Scheider, who doubles as the team principal, and Andersson as the drivers pair.

== Racing record ==
=== Complete FIA World Rallycross Championship results ===
(key)

==== RX2e ====
| Year | Entrant | Car | 1 | 2 | 3 | 4 | 5 | Pos. | Points |
|---|---|---|---|---|---|---|---|---|---|
| 2021 | Olsbergs MSE | OMSE QEV RX2e | BAR | SWE | FRA | BEL; 4 | GER; 8 | 7th | 35 |

==== RX1e/RX1 ====
| Year | Entrant | Car | 1 | 2 | 3 | 4 | 5 | 6 | 7 | 8 | 9 | 10 | Pos. | Points |
|---|---|---|---|---|---|---|---|---|---|---|---|---|---|---|
| 2022 | Construction Equipment Dealer Team | PWR RX1e | NOR; 4 | LAT; 8 | LAT; 7 | POR; 6 | POR; 3 | BEL; 7 | BEL; 6 | ESP; 7 | ESP; 4 | GER; 6 | 7th | 102 |
| 2023 | Construction Equipment Dealer Team | PWR RX1e | POR; 5 | NOR; 4 | SWE; 9 | GBR; C | BLX; C | GER; C | | | | | 7th | 71 |
| 2023 | Construction Equipment Dealer Team | OMSE ZEROID X1 | | | | | | | ZAF; 7 | ZAF; 5 | CHN; 5 | CHN; 6 | 7th | 71 |
| 2024 | Construction Equipment Dealer Team | PWR RX1e | SWE; 2 | SWE; 8 | HUN; 9 | HUN; 3 | BNL; 5 | BNL; 6 | PRT | PRT | CHN | CHN | 6th* | 95* |

^{*} Season still in progress.

=== Complete Extreme E results ===
(key)

| Year | Team | Car | 1 | 2 | 3 | 4 | 5 | 6 | 7 | 8 | 9 | 10 | Pos. | Points |
|---|---|---|---|---|---|---|---|---|---|---|---|---|---|---|
| 2022 | Abt Cupra XE | Spark ODYSSEY 21 | DES | ISL1 | ISL2 | COP; 3 | ENE; 1 | | | | | | 8th | 40 |
| 2023 | Abt Cupra XE | Spark ODYSSEY 21 | DES; 1; 9 | DES; 2; 4 | HYD; 1; 10 | HYD; 2; 8 | ISL1; 1; 4 | ISL1; 2; 6 | ISL2; 1; 2 | ISL2; 2; 3 | COP; 1 DNS | COP; 2; 7 | 6th | 76 |
| 2024 | SUN Minimeal Team | Spark ODYSSEY 21 | DES; 1; 8 | DES; 2; 7 | HYD; 1; 6 | HYD; 2; 7 | ISL1; 1 C | ISL1; 2 C | ISL2; 1 C | ISL2; 2 C | VAL; 1 C | VAL; 2 C | 7th ^{†} | 24 ^{†} |
| 2025 | Carl Cox Motorsport | Spark ODYSSEY 21 | DES; 1; 8 | DES; 2; 6 | | | | | | | | | N/A | N/A |

^{†} Season abandoned.
