= 2022 World RX of Benelux =

Rallycross championship event

- Round 6 of 10 in the 2022 FIA World Rallycross Championship
- Date: 8 October 2022
- Location: Francorchamps, Liège Province
- Venue: Circuit de Spa-Francorchamps

Results
Heat winners
- Heat 1: (Finland) Niclas Grönholm; Construction Equipment Dealer Team
- Heat 2: (Sweden) Timmy Hansen; Hansen World RX Team
Semi-final winners
- Semi-final 1: (Sweden) Timmy Hansen; Hansen World RX Team
- Semi-final 2: (Finland) Niclas Grönholm; Construction Equipment Dealer Team
Final
- First: (Sweden) Johan Kristoffersson; Kristoffersson Motorsport
- Second: (Sweden) Kevin Hansen; Hansen World RX Team
- Third: (Sweden) Gustav Bergström; Gustav Bergström

World RX layout of Circuit de Spa-Francorchamps

2022 World RX of Benelux
- Round 7 of 10 in the 2022 FIA World Rallycross Championship
- Date: 9 October 2022
- Location: Francorchamps, Liège Province
- Venue: Circuit de Spa-Francorchamps

Results
Heat winners
- Heat 1: (Sweden) Timmy Hansen; Hansen World RX Team
- Heat 2: (Sweden) Johan Kristoffersson; Kristoffersson Motorsport
Semi-final winners
- Semi-final 1: (Finland) Niclas Grönholm; Construction Equipment Dealer Team
- Semi-final 2: (Sweden) Johan Kristoffersson; Kristoffersson Motorsport
Final
- First: (Sweden) Johan Kristoffersson; Kristoffersson Motorsport
- Second: (Finland) Niclas Grönholm; Construction Equipment Dealer Team
- Third: (Sweden) Gustav Bergström; Gustav Bergström

The 2022 Benelux World RX of Spa-Francorchamps was the sixth and seventh round of the ninth season of the FIA World Rallycross Championship. The event was double-header (two races in a weekend) held at the Circuit de Spa-Francorchamps in Francorchamps, Belgium.

== World RX1e Championship Race 1 ==
=== Heats ===
Pos.	No.	Driver	Team	Car	Q1	Q2
1	21	(Sweden) Timmy Hansen	Hansen World RX Team	Peugeot 208 RX1e	2nd	1st
2	68	(Finland) Niclas Grönholm	Construction Equipment Dealer Team	PWR RX1e	1st	2nd
3	1	(Sweden) Johan Kristoffersson	Kristoffersson Motorsport	Volkswagen Polo RX1e	3rd	3rd
4	71	(Sweden) Kevin Hansen	Hansen World RX Team	Peugeot 208 RX1e	4th	4th
5	17	(Sweden) Gustav Bergström	Gustav Bergström	Volkswagen Polo RX1e	7th	5th
6	12	(Sweden) Klara Andersson	Construction Equipment Dealer Team	PWR RX1e	6th	6th
7	52	(Norway) Ole Christian Veiby	Kristoffersson Motorsport	Volkswagen Polo RX1e	5th	DNS
8	77	(Germany) René Münnich	ALL-INKL.COM Münnich Motorsport	SEAT Ibiza RX1e	DNF	DNS

=== Progression ===
Race 1

Pos.	No.	Driver	Team	Time
1	21	(Sweden) Timmy Hansen	Hansen World RX Team	2:48.887
2	1	(Sweden) Johan Kristoffersson	Kristoffersson Motorsport	+ 0.753
3	17	(Sweden) Gustav Bergström	Gustav Bergström	+ 5.058
DNF	52	(Norway) Ole Christian Veiby	Kristoffersson Motorsport	+ 1 lap

Race 2

Pos.	No.	Driver	Team	Time
1	71	(Sweden) Kevin Hansen	Hansen World RX Team	2:49.448
2	77	(Germany) René Münnich	ALL-INKL.COM Münnich Motorsport	+ 9.433
DNF	68	(Finland) Niclas Grönholm	Construction Equipment Dealer Team	+ 2 laps
DNS	12	(Sweden) Klara Andersson	Construction Equipment Dealer Team	+ 5 laps

=== Semi-finals ===
Semi-Final 1

Pos.	No.	Driver	Team	Time	Pts
DQ*(7)	12	(Sweden) Klara Andersson	Construction Equipment Dealer Team	2:53.618	9
1	21	(Sweden) Timmy Hansen	Hansen World RX Team	2:55.607	
2	17	(Sweden) Gustav Bergström	Gustav Bergström	DNF	
3(6)	77	(Germany) René Münnich	ALL-INKL.COM Münnich Motorsport	DNF	10

- Note: Klara Andersson was disqualified from the semi-final after being deemed at fault for a first corner collision with Timmy Hansen, Bergström and René Münnich.

Semi-Final 2

Pos.	No.	Driver	Team	Time	Pts
1	68	(Finland) Niclas Grönholm	Construction Equipment Dealer Team	2:45.761	
2	71	(Sweden) Kevin Hansen	Hansen World RX Team	+ 0.378	
3*	1	(Sweden) Johan Kristoffersson	Kristoffersson Motorsport	+ 0.426	
4(8)	52	(Norway) Ole Christian Veiby	Kristoffersson Motorsport	+ 1.557	8

- Note: Johan Kristoffersson progressed to the Final race as one of two placed trird Semi-Finals drivers with better result in Progression Round.

=== Final ===
Pos.	No.	Driver	Team	Time	Pts
1	1	(Sweden) Johan Kristoffersson	Kristoffersson Motorsport	2:45.670	20
2	71	(Sweden) Kevin Hansen	Hansen World RX Team	+ 4.837	16
3	17	(Sweden) Gustav Bergström	Gustav Bergström	+ 5.757	13
4	52	(Sweden) Timmy Hansen	Hansen World RX Team	+ 8.546	12
5	68	(Finland) Niclas Grönholm	Construction Equipment Dealer Team	+ 12.091	11

== World RX1e Championship Race 2 ==
=== Heats ===
Pos.	No.	Driver	Team	Car	Q1	Q2
1	21	(Sweden) Timmy Hansen	Hansen World RX Team	Peugeot 208 RX1e	1st	4th
2	1	(Sweden) Johan Kristoffersson	Kristoffersson Motorsport	Volkswagen Polo RX1e	7th	1st
3	71	(Sweden) Kevin Hansen	Hansen World RX Team	Peugeot 208 RX1e	3rd	2nd
4	52	(Norway) Ole Christian Veiby	Kristoffersson Motorsport	Volkswagen Polo RX1e	2nd	7th
5	68	(Finland) Niclas Grönholm	Construction Equipment Dealer Team	PWR RX1e	6th	3rd
6	12	(Sweden) Klara Andersson	Construction Equipment Dealer Team	PWR RX1e	4th	5th
7	77	(Germany) René Münnich	ALL-INKL.COM Münnich Motorsport	SEAT Ibiza RX1e	5th	DNF
8	17	(Sweden) Gustav Bergström	Gustav Bergström	Volkswagen Polo RX1e	DNF	6th

=== Progression ===
Race 1

Pos.	No.	Driver	Team	Time
1	21	(Sweden) Timmy Hansen	Hansen World RX Team	2:46.017
2	71	(Sweden) Kevin Hansen	Hansen World RX Team	+ 2.110
3	68	(Finland) Niclas Grönholm	Construction Equipment Dealer Team	+ 3.707
4	77	(Germany) René Münnich	ALL-INKL.COM Münnich Motorsport	+ 8.418

Race 2

Pos.	No.	Driver	Team	Time
1	1	(Sweden) Johan Kristoffersson	Kristoffersson Motorsport	2:47.180
2	17	(Sweden) Gustav Bergström	Gustav Bergström	+ 3.526
3	52	(Norway) Ole Christian Veiby	Kristoffersson Motorsport	+ 4.082
4	12	(Sweden) Klara Andersson	Construction Equipment Dealer Team	+ 4.768

=== Semi-finals ===
Semi-Final 1

Pos.	No.	Driver	Team	Time	Pts
1	68	(Finland) Niclas Grönholm	Construction Equipment Dealer Team	2:45.994	
2	17	(Sweden) Gustav Bergström	Gustav Bergström	+ 3.502	
3(6)	12	(Sweden) Klara Andersson	Construction Equipment Dealer Team	+ 10.544	10
4(7)	21	(Sweden) Timmy Hansen	Hansen World RX Team	+ 10.956	9

- Note: Klara Andersson was disqualified from the semi-final after being deemed at fault for a first corner collision with Timmy Hansen, Bergström and René Münnich.

Semi-Final 2

Pos.	No.	Driver	Team	Time	Pts
1	1	(Sweden) Johan Kristoffersson	Kristoffersson Motorsport	2:46.357	
2	71	(Sweden) Kevin Hansen	Hansen World RX Team	+ 1.363	
3*	52	(Norway) Ole Christian Veiby	Kristoffersson Motorsport	+ 2.814	
4(8)	77	(Germany) René Münnich	ALL-INKL.COM Münnich Motorsport	DNF	8

- Note: Ole Christian Veiby progressed to the Final race as one of two placed trird Semi-Finals drivers with better result in Progression Round.

=== Final ===
Pos.	No.	Driver	Team	Time	Pts
1	1	(Sweden) Johan Kristoffersson	Kristoffersson Motorsport	2:46.354	20
2	68	(Finland) Niclas Grönholm	Construction Equipment Dealer Team	+ 3.995	16
3	17	(Sweden) Gustav Bergström	Gustav Bergström	+ 4.932	13
4	71	(Sweden) Kevin Hansen	Hansen World RX Team	+ 9.305	12
5	52	(Norway) Ole Christian Veiby	Kristoffersson Motorsport	DNF	11

== Standings after the event ==
Pos.	Driver	Pts	Gap
1	(Sweden) Johan Kristoffersson	131	
2	(Sweden) Kevin Hansen	90	+41
3	(Norway) Ole Christian Veiby	89	+42
4	(Finland) Niclas Grönholm	87	+44
5	(Sweden) Timmy Hansen	87	+44

- Note: Only the top five positions are included.

Previous race: 2022 World RX of Portugal	FIA World Rallycross Championship; 2022 season	Next race: 2022 World RX of Catalunya
Previous race: 2021 World RX of Benelux	World RX of Benelux	Next race: -
