= 2022 World RX of Germany =

Rallycross championship

- Round 10 of 10 in the 2022 FIA World Rallycross Championship
- Date: 12-13 November 2022
- Location: Nürburg, Germany
- Venue: Nürburgring

Results
Heat winners
- Heat 1: (Sweden) Johan Kristoffersson; Kristoffersson Motorsport
- Heat 2: (Sweden) Kevin Hansen; Hansen World RX Team
- Heat 3: (Sweden) Johan Kristoffersson; Kristoffersson Motorsport
Semi-final winners
- Semi-final 1: (Sweden) Johan Kristoffersson; Kristoffersson Motorsport
- Semi-final 2: (Sweden) Timmy Hansen; Hansen World RX Team
Final
- First: (Sweden) Johan Kristoffersson; Kristoffersson Motorsport
- Second: (Finland) Niclas Grönholm; Construction Equipment Dealer Team
- Third: (Sweden) Timmy Hansen; Hansen World RX Team

World RX layout of Nürburgring

The 2022 World RX of Germany was the tenth and final round of the ninth season of the FIA World Rallycross Championship. The event was held at the Nürburgring, Nürburg.Johan Kristoffersson concluded a dominant 2022 FIA World Rallycross Championship campaign with an eighth victory from ten rounds at World RX of Germany (13 November).

== World RX1 Championship ==
=== Heats ===
Pos.	No.	Driver	Team	Car	Q1	Q2	Q3
1	1	(Sweden) Johan Kristoffersson	Kristoffersson Motorsport	Volkswagen Polo RX1e	1st	4th	1st
2	21	(Sweden) Timmy Hansen	Hansen World RX Team	Peugeot 208 RX1e	2nd	3rd	2nd
3	71	(Sweden) Kevin Hansen	Hansen World RX Team	Peugeot 208 RX1e	5th	1st	4th
4	52	(Norway) Ole Christian Veiby	Kristoffersson Motorsport	Volkswagen Polo RX1e	3rd	2nd	DNF
5	12	(Sweden) Klara Andersson	Construction Equipment Dealer Team	PWR RX1e	7th	5th	3rd
6	68	(Finland) Niclas Grönholm	Construction Equipment Dealer Team	PWR RX1e	4th	DNF	5th
7	17	(Sweden) Gustav Bergström	Gustav Bergström	Volkswagen Polo RX1e	6th	DNF	6th
8	92	(Sweden) Anton Marklund	ALL-INKL.COM Münnich Motorsport	SEAT Ibiza RX1e	8th	DSQ	7th
9	36	(France) Guerlain Chicherit	Guerlain Chicherit	Lancia Delta Evo-e RX	DNF	DNS	DNS

=== Progression ===
Race 1

Pos.	No.	Driver	Team	Time
1	1	(Sweden) Johan Kristoffersson	Kristoffersson Motorsport	2:51.331
2	12	(Sweden) Klara Andersson	Construction Equipment Dealer Team	+ 0.329
3	71	(Sweden) Kevin Hansen	Hansen World RX Team	+ 0.705
4	17	(Sweden) Gustav Bergström	Gustav Bergström	+ 2.274

Race 2

Pos.	No.	Driver	Team	Time
1	21	(Sweden) Timmy Hansen	Hansen World RX Team	2:49.102
2	68	(Finland) Niclas Grönholm	Construction Equipment Dealer Team	+ 1.751
3	52	(Norway) Ole Christian Veiby	Kristoffersson Motorsport	+ 1.829
4	92	(Sweden) Anton Marklund	ALL-INKL.COM Münnich Motorsport	+ 4.531
5	36	(France) Guerlain Chicherit	Guerlain Chicherit	+ 7.675

=== Semi-finals ===
Semi-Final 1

Pos.	No.	Driver	Team	Time	Pts
1	1	(Sweden) Johan Kristoffersson	Kristoffersson Motorsport	2:48.785	
2	71	(Sweden) Kevin Hansen	Hansen World RX Team	+ 2.048	
3*	68	(Finland) Niclas Grönholm	Construction Equipment Dealer Team	+ 3.831	
4(8)	92	(Sweden) Anton Marklund	ALL-INKL.COM Münnich Motorsport	+ 8.515	8

Semi-Final 2

Pos.	No.	Driver	Team	Time	Pts
1	21	(Sweden) Timmy Hansen	Hansen World RX Team	2:49.706	
2	52	(Norway) Ole Christian Veiby	Kristoffersson Motorsport	+ 2.753	
3*	12	(Sweden) Klara Andersson	Construction Equipment Dealer Team	+ 3.934	
4(7)	17	(Sweden) Gustav Bergström	Gustav Bergström	+ 5.761	9
5(9)	36	(France) Guerlain Chicherit	Guerlain Chicherit	DNF	7

- Note: Klara Andersson progressed to the Final race as one of two placed trird Semi-Finals drivers with better result in Progression Round, but withdrawn to allow her teammate Niclas Grönholm to participate for top-5 battle in general classification.

=== Final ===
Pos.	No.	Driver	Team	Time	Pts
1	1	(Sweden) Johan Kristoffersson	Kristoffersson Motorsport	2:46.942	20
2	68	(Finland) Niclas Grönholm	Construction Equipment Dealer Team	+ 2.275	16
3	21	(Sweden) Timmy Hansen	Hansen World RX Team	+ 2.852	13
4	52	(Norway) Ole Christian Veiby	Kristoffersson Motorsport	+ 4.709	12
DSQ*	71	(Sweden) Kevin Hansen	Hansen World RX Team	+ 1.669	11

- Note: Kevin Hansen originally finished second, but later he was disqualified from the final due to a technical infringement.

== Standings after the event ==
Pos.	Driver	Pts	Gap
WC	(Sweden) Johan Kristoffersson	182	
2	(Sweden) Timmy Hansen	136	+46
3	(Finland) Niclas Grönholm	130	+52
4	(Norway) Ole Christian Veiby	124	+58
5	(Sweden) Kevin Hansen	123	+59

- Note: Only the top five positions are included.

Previous race: 2022 World RX of Catalunya	FIA World Rallycross Championship; 2022 season	Next race: 2023 World RX of Portugal
Previous race: 2021 World RX of Germany	World RX of Germany	Next race: 2023 World RX of Germany
