= 2022 World RX of Portugal =

Season of motor racing

- Round 4 of 10 in the 2022 FIA World Rallycross Championship
- Date: 17 September 2022
- Location: Montalegre, Vila Real
- Venue: Pista Automóvel de Montalegre

Results
Heat winners
- Heat 1: (Sweden) Johan Kristoffersson; Kristoffersson Motorsport
- Heat 2: (Sweden) Johan Kristoffersson; Kristoffersson Motorsport
Semi-final winners
- Semi-final 1: (Norway) Ole Christian Veiby; Kristoffersson Motorsport
- Semi-final 2: (Sweden) Johan Kristoffersson; Kristoffersson Motorsport
Final
- First: (Sweden) Johan Kristoffersson; Kristoffersson Motorsport
- Second: (Norway) Ole Christian Veiby; Kristoffersson Motorsport
- Third: (Sweden) Timmy Hansen; Hansen World RX Team

World RX layout of Pista Automóvel de Montalegre

2022 World RX of Portugal
- Round 5 of 10 in the 2022 FIA World Rallycross Championship
- Date: 18 September 2022
- Location: Montalegre, Vila Real
- Venue: Pista Automóvel de Montalegre

Results
Heat winners
- Heat 1: (Sweden) Johan Kristoffersson; Kristoffersson Motorsport
- Heat 2: (Sweden) Johan Kristoffersson; Kristoffersson Motorsport
Semi-final winners
- Semi-final 1: (Finland) Niclas Grönholm; Construction Equipment Dealer Team
- Semi-final 2: (Sweden) Johan Kristoffersson; Kristoffersson Motorsport
Final
- First: (Finland) Niclas Grönholm; Construction Equipment Dealer Team
- Second: (Norway) Ole Christian Veiby; Kristoffersson Motorsport
- Third: (Sweden) Klara Andersson; Construction Equipment Dealer Team

The 2022 Lusorecursos World RX of Portugal was the fourth and fifth round of the ninth season of the FIA World Rallycross Championship. The event was double-header (two races in a weekend) held at the new configuration of Pista Automóvel de Montalegre in Montalegre, Vila Real. Montalegre’s layout has been re-profiled this year, with the old joker lap now the first corner and a new, gravel joker from Turns Two to Five.

== World RX1e Championship Race 1 ==
=== Heats ===
| Pos. | No. | Driver | Team | Car | Q1 | Q2 |
|---|---|---|---|---|---|---|
| 1 | 1 | (Sweden) Johan Kristoffersson | Kristoffersson Motorsport | Volkswagen Polo RX1e | 1st | 1st |
| 2 | 21 | (Sweden) Timmy Hansen | Hansen World RX Team | Peugeot 208 RX1e | 3rd | 2nd |
| 3 | 71 | (Sweden) Kevin Hansen | Hansen World RX Team | Peugeot 208 RX1e | 5th | 3rd |
| 4 | 17 | (Sweden) Gustav Bergström | Gustav Bergström | Volkswagen Polo RX1e | 6th | 4th |
| 5 | 68 | (Finland) Niclas Grönholm | Construction Equipment Dealer Team | PWR RX1e | 4th | 6th |
| 6 | 52 | (Norway) Ole Christian Veiby | Kristoffersson Motorsport | Volkswagen Polo RX1e | 2nd | DNS |
| 7 | 12 | (Sweden) Klara Andersson | Construction Equipment Dealer Team | PWR RX1e | 7th | 5th |
| 8 | 77 | (Germany) René Münnich | ALL-INKL.COM Münnich Motorsport | SEAT Ibiza RX1e | 8th | 7th |

=== Progression ===
Race 1

| Pos. | No. | Driver | Team | Time |
|---|---|---|---|---|
| 1 | 68 | (Finland) Niclas Grönholm | Construction Equipment Dealer Team | 3:35.593 |
| 2 | 71 | (Sweden) Kevin Hansen | Hansen World RX Team | + 2.018 |
| 3 | 12 | (Sweden) Klara Andersson | Construction Equipment Dealer Team | + 3.185 |
| DNF | 1 | (Sweden) Johan Kristoffersson | Kristoffersson Motorsport | + 3 laps |

Race 2

| Pos. | No. | Driver | Team | Time |
|---|---|---|---|---|
| 1 | 21 | (Sweden) Timmy Hansen | Hansen World RX Team | 3:34.410 |
| 2 | 17 | (Sweden) Gustav Bergström | Gustav Bergström | + 1.862 |
| 3 | 77 | (Germany) René Münnich | ALL-INKL.COM Münnich Motorsport | + 12.672 |
| DNS | 52 | (Norway) Ole Christian Veiby | Kristoffersson Motorsport | + 5 laps |

=== Semi-finals ===
Semi-Final 1

| Pos. | No. | Driver | Team | Time | Pts |
|---|---|---|---|---|---|
| 1 | 52 | (Norway) Ole Christian Veiby | Kristoffersson Motorsport | 3:35.781 | |
| 2 | 17 | (Sweden) Gustav Bergström | Gustav Bergström | + 2.540 | |
| 3(6) | 12 | (Sweden) Klara Andersson | Construction Equipment Dealer Team | + 5.843 | 10 |
| 4(7) | 68 | (Finland) Niclas Grönholm | Construction Equipment Dealer Team | + 7.931 | 9 |

Semi-Final 2

| Pos. | No. | Driver | Team | Time | Pts |
|---|---|---|---|---|---|
| 1 | 1 | (Sweden) Johan Kristoffersson | Kristoffersson Motorsport | 3:33.990 | |
| 2 | 21 | (Sweden) Timmy Hansen | Hansen World RX Team | + 1.548 | |
| 3 | 71 | (Sweden) Kevin Hansen | Hansen World RX Team | + 2.626 | |
| 4(8) | 77 | (Germany) René Münnich | ALL-INKL.COM Münnich Motorsport | + 7.692 | 8 |

- Note: Kevin Hansen progressed to the Final race as one of two placed third Semi-Finals drivers with better result in Progression Round.

=== Final ===
| Pos. | No. | Driver | Team | Time | Pts |
|---|---|---|---|---|---|
| 1 | 1 | (Sweden) Johan Kristoffersson | Kristoffersson Motorsport | 3:34.313 | 20 |
| 2 | 52 | (Norway) Ole Christian Veiby | Kristoffersson Motorsport | + 1.666 | 16 |
| 3 | 21 | (Sweden) Timmy Hansen | Hansen World RX Team | + 2.080 | 13 |
| 4 | 71 | (Sweden) Kevin Hansen | Hansen World RX Team | + 2.874 | 12 |
| 5 | 17 | (Sweden) Gustav Bergström | Gustav Bergström | + 6.673 | 11 |

== World RX1e Championship Race 2 ==
=== Heats ===
| Pos. | No. | Driver | Team | Car | Q1 | Q2 |
|---|---|---|---|---|---|---|
| 1 | 1 | (Sweden) Johan Kristoffersson | Kristoffersson Motorsport | Volkswagen Polo RX1e | 1st | 1st |
| 2 | 21 | (Sweden) Timmy Hansen | Hansen World RX Team | Peugeot 208 RX1e | 2nd | 3rd |
| 3 | 71 | (Sweden) Kevin Hansen | Hansen World RX Team | Peugeot 208 RX1e | 4th | 2nd |
| 4 | 52 | (Norway) Ole Christian Veiby | Kristoffersson Motorsport | Volkswagen Polo RX1e | 3rd | 4th |
| 5 | 17 | (Sweden) Gustav Bergström | Gustav Bergström | Volkswagen Polo RX1e | 5th | 6th |
| 6 | 68 | (Finland) Niclas Grönholm | Construction Equipment Dealer Team | PWR RX1e | 8th | 5th |
| 7 | 12 | (Sweden) Klara Andersson | Construction Equipment Dealer Team | PWR RX1e | 6th | 7th |
| 8 | 77 | (Germany) René Münnich | ALL-INKL.COM Münnich Motorsport | SEAT Ibiza RX1e | 7th | 8th |

=== Progression ===
Race 1

| Pos. | No. | Driver | Team | Time |
|---|---|---|---|---|
| 1 | 71 | (Sweden) Kevin Hansen | Hansen World RX Team | 3:42.457 |
| 2 | 1 | (Sweden) Johan Kristoffersson | Kristoffersson Motorsport | + 0.350 |
| 3 | 12 | (Sweden) Klara Andersson | Construction Equipment Dealer Team | + 4.526 |
| DNS | 17 | (Sweden) Gustav Bergström | Gustav Bergström | + 5 laps |

Race 2

| Pos. | No. | Driver | Team | Time |
|---|---|---|---|---|
| 1 | 21 | (Sweden) Timmy Hansen | Hansen World RX Team | 3:36.040 |
| 2 | 68 | (Finland) Niclas Grönholm | Construction Equipment Dealer Team | + 0.596 |
| 3 | 52 | (Norway) Ole Christian Veiby | Kristoffersson Motorsport | + 2.867 |
| 4 | 77 | (Germany) René Münnich | ALL-INKL.COM Münnich Motorsport | + 15.871 |

=== Semi-finals ===
Semi-Final 1

| Pos. | No. | Driver | Team | Time | Pts |
|---|---|---|---|---|---|
| 1 | 68 | (Finland) Niclas Grönholm | Construction Equipment Dealer Team | 3:42.578 | |
| 2 | 12 | (Sweden) Klara Andersson | Construction Equipment Dealer Team | + 2.345 | |
| 3(6) | 77 | (Germany) René Münnich | ALL-INKL.COM Münnich Motorsport | + 3.149 | 10 |
| 4(7) | 71 | (Sweden) Kevin Hansen | Hansen World RX Team | DNF | 9 |

Semi-Final 2

| Pos. | No. | Driver | Team | Time | Pts |
|---|---|---|---|---|---|
| 1 | 1 | (Sweden) Johan Kristoffersson | Kristoffersson Motorsport | 3:33.712 | |
| 2 | 52 | (Norway) Ole Christian Veiby | Kristoffersson Motorsport | + 2.840 | |
| 3* | 21 | (Sweden) Timmy Hansen | Hansen World RX Team | + 13.511 | |
| DNS(8)** | 17 | (Sweden) Gustav Bergström | Gustav Bergström | | 8 |

- Note: Timmy Hansen progressed to the Final race as one of two placed trird Semi-Finals drivers with better result in Progression Round.
- Note: Gustav Bergström’s day ended when he was ruled out of the progression race due to a late arrival at pre-grid.

=== Final ===
| Pos. | No. | Driver | Team | Time | Pts |
|---|---|---|---|---|---|
| 1 | 68 | (Finland) Niclas Grönholm | Construction Equipment Dealer Team | 3:37.355 | 20 |
| 2 | 52 | (Norway) Ole Christian Veiby | Kristoffersson Motorsport | + 2.853 | 16 |
| 3 | 12 | (Sweden) Klara Andersson | Construction Equipment Dealer Team | + 4.412 | 13 |
| 4 | 21 | (Sweden) Timmy Hansen | Hansen World RX Team | + 4.821 | 12 |
| 5* | 1 | (Sweden) Johan Kristoffersson | Kristoffersson Motorsport | + 9.241 | 11 |

- Note: Johan Kristoffersson originally finished 1st but got 10 sec penalty for collision with Timmy Hansen on the 1st lap.

== Standings after the event ==
| Pos. | Driver | Pts | Gap |
|---|---|---|---|
| 1 | (Sweden) Johan Kristoffersson | 91 | |
| 2 | (Norway) Ole Christian Veiby | 70 | +21 |
| 3 | (Sweden) Timmy Hansen | 66 | +25 |
| 4 | (Sweden) Kevin Hansen | 62 | +29 |
| 5 | (Finland) Niclas Grönholm | 60 | +31 |

- Note: Only the top five positions are included.

| Previous race: 2022 World RX of Riga-Latvia | FIA World Rallycross Championship; 2022 season | Next race: 2022 World RX of Benelux |
| Previous race: 2021 World RX of Portugal | World RX of Portugal | Next race: 2023 World RX of Portugal |
