= World RX of Latvia =

The World RX of Latvia was a Rallycross event held in Latvia for the FIA World Rallycross Championship. The event made its debut in the 2016 season, at the Biķernieku Kompleksā Sporta Bāze in Riga.

World RX layout of Biķernieku Kompleksā Sporta Bāze

== Past winners ==
Year	Qualifying 1 winner	Qualifying 2 winner	Qualifying 3 winner	Qualifying 4 winner	Semi-Final 1 winner	Semi-Final 2 winner	Final winner
2016	(Sweden) Timmy Hansen	(Sweden) Johan Kristoffersson	(Sweden) Johan Kristoffersson	(Russia) Timur Timerzyanov	(France) Sébastien Loeb	(Sweden) Mattias Ekström	(France) Sébastien Loeb
2017	(Sweden) Johan Kristoffersson	(Finland) Toomas Heikkinen	(Sweden) Johan Kristoffersson	(France) Sébastien Loeb	(Sweden) Johan Kristoffersson	(France) Sébastien Loeb	(Sweden) Johan Kristoffersson
2018	(Sweden) Johan Kristoffersson	(Sweden) Johan Kristoffersson	(Sweden) Timmy Hansen	(Sweden) Johan Kristoffersson	(Sweden) Johan Kristoffersson	(France) Sébastien Loeb	(Sweden) Johan Kristoffersson
2019	(Lithuania) Rokas Baciuška	(Finland) Niclas Grönholm	(Sweden) Timmy Hansen	(Sweden) Timmy Hansen	(Norway) Andreas Bakkerud	(Sweden) Timmy Hansen	(Sweden) Timmy Hansen
2020	(Sweden) Johan Kristoffersson	(Finland) Niclas Grönholm	(Sweden) Mattias Ekström	No Q4 (Double Header)	(Sweden) Mattias Ekström	(Sweden) Johan Kristoffersson	(Sweden) Johan Kristoffersson
2020	(Sweden) Mattias Ekström	(Sweden) Mattias Ekström	(Sweden) Robin Larsson	No Q4 (Double Header)	(Sweden) Mattias Ekström	(Sweden) Johan Kristoffersson	(Sweden) Mattias Ekström
2021	(Sweden) Johan Kristoffersson	(Finland) Mattias Ekström	(Finland) Niclas Grönholm	No Q4 (Double Header)	(Sweden) Johan Kristoffersson	(Finland) Niclas Grönholm	(Finland) Niclas Grönholm
2021	(Sweden) Mattias Ekström	(Finland) Niclas Grönholm	(Finland) Niclas Grönholm	No Q4 (Double Header)	(Finland) Niclas Grönholm	(Sweden) Johan Kristoffersson	(Sweden) Johan Kristoffersson
Year	Heat 1 winner	Heat 2 winner	Heat 3 winner	Progression best time	Semi-Final 1 winner	Semi-Final 2 winner	Final winner
2022	(Sweden) Johan Kristoffersson	(Sweden) Kevin Hansen	No Q3 (Double Header)	(Sweden) Johan Kristoffersson	(Sweden) Kevin Hansen	(Sweden) Johan Kristoffersson	(Sweden) Johan Kristoffersson
2022	(Sweden) Johan Kristoffersson	(Sweden) Timmy Hansen	No Q3 (Double Header)	(Sweden) Johan Kristoffersson	(Sweden) Johan Kristoffersson	(Finland) Niclas Grönholm	(Sweden) Johan Kristoffersson
