= 2022 World RX of Latvia =

Motor racing season

- Round 2 of 10 in the 2022 FIA World Rallycross Championship
- Date: 3 September 2022
- Location: Riga, Latvia
- Venue: Biķernieku Kompleksā Sporta Bāze

Results
Heat winners
- Heat 1: (Sweden) Johan Kristoffersson; Kristoffersson Motorsport
- Heat 2: (Sweden) Kevin Hansen; Hansen World RX Team
Semi-final winners
- Semi-final 1: (Sweden) Kevin Hansen; Hansen World RX Team
- Semi-final 2: (Sweden) Johan Kristoffersson; Kristoffersson Motorsport
Final
- First: (Sweden) Johan Kristoffersson; Kristoffersson Motorsport
- Second: (Sweden) Kevin Hansen; Hansen World RX Team
- Third: (Sweden) Timmy Hansen; Hansen World RX Team

World RX layout of Biķernieku Kompleksā Sporta Bāze

2022 World RX of Latvia
- Round 3 of 10 in the 2022 FIA World Rallycross Championship
- Date: 4 September 2022
- Location: Riga, Latvia
- Venue: Biķernieku Kompleksā Sporta Bāze

Results
Heat winners
- Heat 1: (Sweden) Johan Kristoffersson; Kristoffersson Motorsport
- Heat 2: (Sweden) Timmy Hansen; Hansen World RX Team
Semi-final winners
- Semi-final 1: (Sweden) Johan Kristoffersson; Kristoffersson Motorsport
- Semi-final 2: (Finland) Niclas Grönholm; Construction Equipment Dealer Team
Final
- First: (Sweden) Johan Kristoffersson; Kristoffersson Motorsport
- Second: (Sweden) Kevin Hansen; Hansen World RX Team
- Third: (Norway) Ole Christian Veiby; Kristoffersson Motorsport

The 2022 Ferratum World RX of Rīga-Latvia was the second and third round of the ninth season of the FIA World Rallycross Championship. The event was first double-header (two races in a weekend) of the season and held at Biķernieku Kompleksā Sporta Bāze, in the Latvian capital of Riga.

== World RX1e Championship Race 1 ==
=== Heats ===
| Pos. | No. | Driver | Team | Car | Q1 | Q2 |
|---|---|---|---|---|---|---|
| 1 | 71 | (Sweden) Kevin Hansen | Hansen World RX Team | Peugeot 208 RX1e | 3rd | 1st |
| 2 | 1 | (Sweden) Johan Kristoffersson | Kristoffersson Motorsport | Volkswagen Polo RX1e | 1st | 5th |
| 3 | 21 | (Sweden) Timmy Hansen | Hansen World RX Team | Peugeot 208 RX1e | 2nd | 3rd |
| 4 | 68 | (Finland) Niclas Grönholm | Construction Equipment Dealer Team | PWR RX1e | 5th | 2nd |
| 5 | 52 | (Norway) Ole Christian Veiby | Kristoffersson Motorsport | Volkswagen Polo RX1e | 4th | 4th |
| 6 | 17 | (Sweden) Gustav Bergström | Gustav Bergström | Volkswagen Polo RX1e | 6th | 6th |
| 7 | 12 | (Sweden) Klara Andersson | Construction Equipment Dealer Team | PWR RX1e | 7th | 7th |
| 8 | 77 | (Germany) René Münnich | ALL-INKL.COM Münnich Motorsport | SEAT Ibiza RX1e | 8th | 8th |

=== Progression ===
Race 1

| Pos. | No. | Driver | Team | Time |
|---|---|---|---|---|
| 1 | 71 | (Sweden) Kevin Hansen | Hansen World RX Team | 4:12.651 |
| 2 | 21 | (Sweden) Timmy Hansen | Hansen World RX Team | + 0.798 |
| 3 | 52 | (Norway) Ole Christian Veiby | Kristoffersson Motorsport | + 1.192 |
| 4 | 12 | (Sweden) Klara Andersson | Construction Equipment Dealer Team | + 18.213 |

Race 2

| Pos. | No. | Driver | Team | Time |
|---|---|---|---|---|
| 1 | 1 | (Sweden) Johan Kristoffersson | Kristoffersson Motorsport | 4:11.333 |
| 2 | 68 | (Finland) Niclas Grönholm | Construction Equipment Dealer Team | + 2.626 |
| 3 | 17 | (Sweden) Gustav Bergström | Gustav Bergström | + 3.327 |
| 4 | 77 | (Germany) René Münnich | ALL-INKL.COM Münnich Motorsport | + 9.647 |

=== Semi-finals ===
Semi-Final 1

| Pos. | No. | Driver | Team | Time | Pts |
|---|---|---|---|---|---|
| 1 | 71 | (Sweden) Kevin Hansen | Hansen World RX Team | 4:12.732 | |
| 2 | 52 | (Norway) Ole Christian Veiby | Kristoffersson Motorsport | + 0.384 | |
| 3(6) | 77 | (Germany) René Münnich | ALL-INKL.COM Münnich Motorsport | + 7.836 | 10 |
| 4(7) | 68 | (Finland) Niclas Grönholm | Construction Equipment Dealer Team | + 3 laps | 9 |

Semi-Final 2

| Pos. | No. | Driver | Team | Time | Pts |
|---|---|---|---|---|---|
| 1 | 1 | (Sweden) Johan Kristoffersson | Kristoffersson Motorsport | 4:12.302 | |
| 2 | 21 | (Sweden) Timmy Hansen | Hansen World RX Team | + 3.605 | |
| 3* | 17 | (Sweden) Gustav Bergström | Gustav Bergström | + 4.236 | |
| 4(8) | 12 | (Sweden) Klara Andersson | Construction Equipment Dealer Team | + 6.843 | 8 |

- Note: Gustav Bergström progressed to the Final race as one of two placed third Semi-Finals drivers with better result in Progression Round.

=== Final ===
| Pos. | No. | Driver | Team | Time | Pts |
|---|---|---|---|---|---|
| 1 | 1 | (Sweden) Johan Kristoffersson | Kristoffersson Motorsport | 4:10.054 | 20 |
| 2 | 21 | (Sweden) Kevin Hansen | Hansen World RX Team | + 2.082 | 16 |
| 3 | 21 | (Sweden) Timmy Hansen | Hansen World RX Team | + 4.057 | 13 |
| 4 | 52 | (Norway) Ole Christian Veiby | Kristoffersson Motorsport | + 3.400 | 12 |
| 5 | 17 | (Sweden) Gustav Bergström | Gustav Bergström | + 7.403 | 11 |

== World RX1e Championship Race 2 ==
=== Heats ===
| Pos. | No. | Driver | Team | Car | Q1 | Q2 |
|---|---|---|---|---|---|---|
| 1 | 1 | (Sweden) Johan Kristoffersson | Kristoffersson Motorsport | Volkswagen Polo RX1e | 1st | 2nd |
| 2 | 21 | (Sweden) Timmy Hansen | Hansen World RX Team | Peugeot 208 RX1e | 4th | 1st |
| 3 | 52 | (Norway) Ole Christian Veiby | Kristoffersson Motorsport | Volkswagen Polo RX1e | 2nd | 5th |
| 4 | 68 | (Finland) Niclas Grönholm | Construction Equipment Dealer Team | PWR RX1e | 3rd | 3rd |
| 5 | 17 | (Sweden) Gustav Bergström | Gustav Bergström | Volkswagen Polo RX1e | 8th | 4th |
| 6 | 12 | (Sweden) Klara Andersson | Construction Equipment Dealer Team | PWR RX1e | 7th | 6th |
| 7 | 77 | (Germany) René Münnich | ALL-INKL.COM Münnich Motorsport | SEAT Ibiza RX1e | 6th | 7th |
| 8 | 71 | (Sweden) Kevin Hansen | Hansen World RX Team | Peugeot 208 RX1e | 5th | DNF |

=== Progression ===
Race 1

| Pos. | No. | Driver | Team | Time |
|---|---|---|---|---|
| 1 | 1 | (Sweden) Johan Kristoffersson | Kristoffersson Motorsport | 4:09.770 |
| 2 | 52 | (Norway) Ole Christian Veiby | Kristoffersson Motorsport | + 1.822 |
| 3 | 17 | (Sweden) Gustav Bergström | Gustav Bergström | + 3.759 |
| 4 | 77 | (Germany) René Münnich | ALL-INKL.COM Münnich Motorsport | + 8.976 |

Race 2

| Pos. | No. | Driver | Team | Time |
|---|---|---|---|---|
| 1 | 71 | (Sweden) Kevin Hansen | Hansen World RX Team | 4:16.293 |
| 2 | 12 | (Sweden) Klara Andersson | Construction Equipment Dealer Team | + 4.989 |
| DNF | 68 | (Finland) Niclas Grönholm | Construction Equipment Dealer Team | + 3 laps |
| DNF | 21 | (Sweden) Timmy Hansen | Hansen World RX Team | + 3 laps |

=== Semi-finals ===
Semi-Final 1

| Pos. | No. | Driver | Team | Time | Pts |
|---|---|---|---|---|---|
| 1 | 1 | (Sweden) Johan Kristoffersson | Kristoffersson Motorsport | 4:32.348 | |
| 2 | 21 | (Sweden) Timmy Hansen | Hansen World RX Team | + 5.337 | |
| 3(6) | 17 | (Sweden) Gustav Bergström | Gustav Bergström | + 13.680 | 10 |
| 4(7) | 12 | (Sweden) Klara Andersson | Construction Equipment Dealer Team | + 13.882 | 9 |

Semi-Final 2

| Pos. | No. | Driver | Team | Time | Pts |
|---|---|---|---|---|---|
| 1 | 68 | (Finland) Niclas Grönholm | Construction Equipment Dealer Team | 4:31.898 | |
| 2 | 71 | (Sweden) Kevin Hansen | Hansen World RX Team | + 4.220 | |
| 3* | 52 | (Norway) Ole Christian Veiby | Kristoffersson Motorsport | + 9.181 | |
| 4(8) | 77 | (Germany) René Münnich | ALL-INKL.COM Münnich Motorsport | + 16.803 | 8 |

- Note: Ole Christian Veiby progressed to the Final race as one of two placed trird Semi-Finals drivers with better result in Progression Round.

=== Final ===
| Pos. | No. | Driver | Team | Time | Pts |
|---|---|---|---|---|---|
| 1 | 1 | (Sweden) Johan Kristoffersson | Kristoffersson Motorsport | 4:19.030 | 20 |
| 2 | 71 | (Sweden) Kevin Hansen | Hansen World RX Team | + 0.285 | 16 |
| 3 | 21 | (Norway) Ole Christian Veiby | Kristoffersson Motorsport | + 1.657 | 13 |
| 4 | 52 | (Sweden) Timmy Hansen | Hansen World RX Team | + 2.139 | 12 |
| 5 | 68 | (Finland) Niclas Grönholm | Construction Equipment Dealer Team | + 2.567 | 11 |

== Standings after the event ==
| Pos. | Driver | Pts | Gap |
|---|---|---|---|
| 1 | (Sweden) Johan Kristoffersson | 60 | |
| 2 | (Sweden) Kevin Hansen | 41 | +19 |
| 3 | (Sweden) Timmy Hansen | 41 | +19 |
| 4 | (Norway) Ole Christian Veiby | 38 | +22 |
| 5 | (Finland) Niclas Grönholm | 31 | +29 |

- Note: Only the top five positions are included.

| Previous race: 2022 World RX of Norway | FIA World Rallycross Championship; 2022 season | Next race: 2022 World RX of Portugal |
| Previous race: 2021 World RX of Latvia | World RX of Latvia | Next race: - |
