= 2016 World RX of Latvia =

Rallycross series held in Latvia

- Round 10 of 12 in the 2016 FIA World Rallycross Championship
- Date: 1–2 October 2016
- Location: Riga, Latvia
- Venue: Biķernieku Kompleksā Sporta Bāze

Results
Heat winners
- Heat 1: (Sweden) Timmy Hansen; Team Peugeot-Hansen
- Heat 2: Johan Kristoffersson; Volkswagen RX Sweden
- Heat 3: Johan Kristoffersson; Volkswagen RX Sweden
- Heat 4: (Russia) Timur Timerzyanov; World RX Team Austria
Semi-final winners
- Semi-final 1: (France) Sébastien Loeb; Team Peugeot-Hansen
- Semi-final 2: (Sweden) Mattias Ekström; EKS RX
Final
- First: (France) Sébastien Loeb; Team Peugeot-Hansen
- Second: (Sweden) Mattias Ekström; EKS RX
- Third: (Sweden) Timmy Hansen; Team Peugeot-Hansen

World RX layout of Biķernieku Kompleksā Sporta Bāze

The 2016 World RX of Latvia was the tenth round of the third season of the FIA World Rallycross Championship and the eighth round of the forty-first season of the FIA European Rallycross Championship. The event was the first FIA World or European rallycross event to be staged in Latvia, and was held at the Biķernieku Kompleksā Sporta Bāze, former host of the non-championship Latvian Grand Prix.

== Supercar ==
=== Heats ===
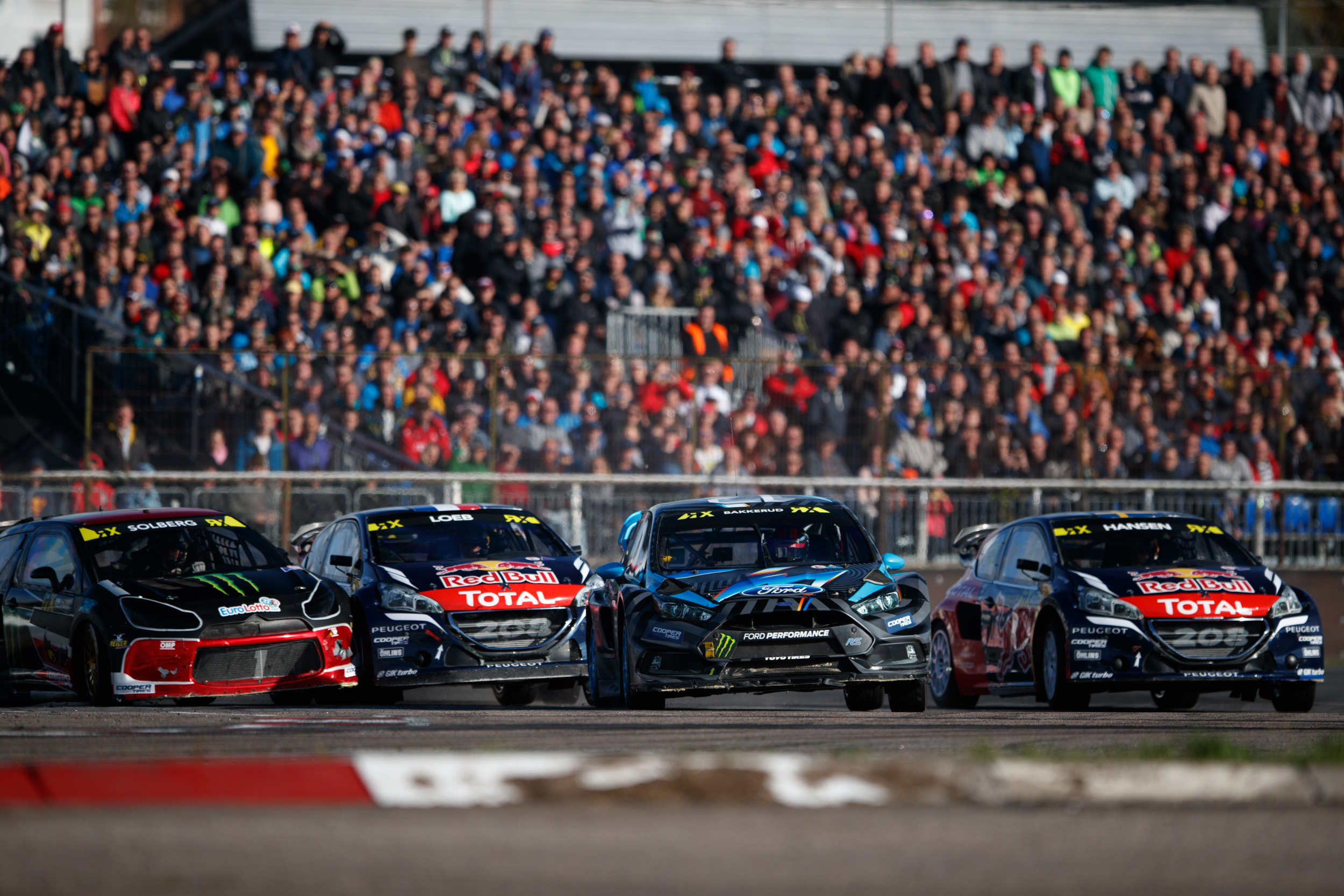
Solberg, Loeb, Bakkerud and Hansen fight for position

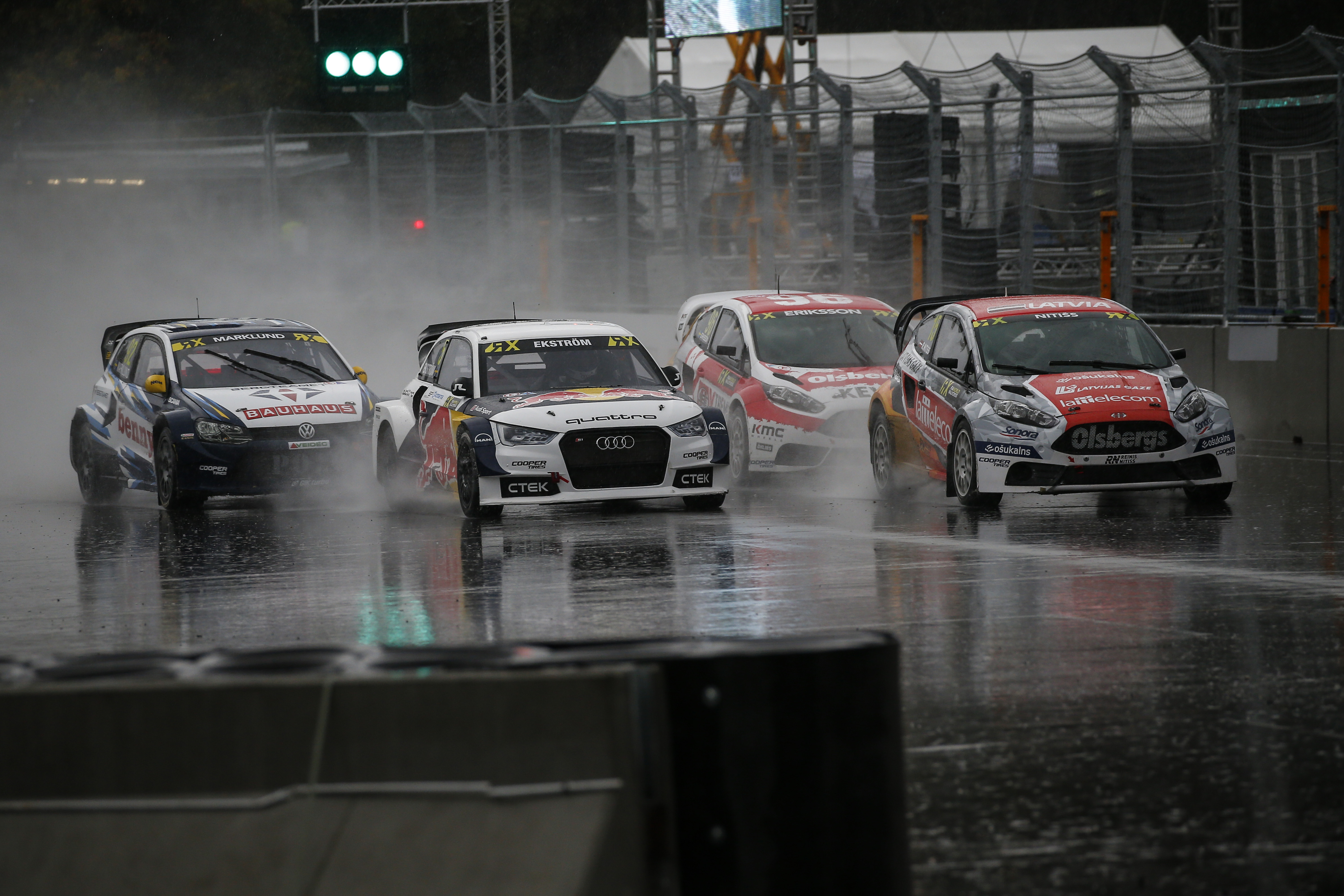
Sunday's action started in treacherous wet conditions

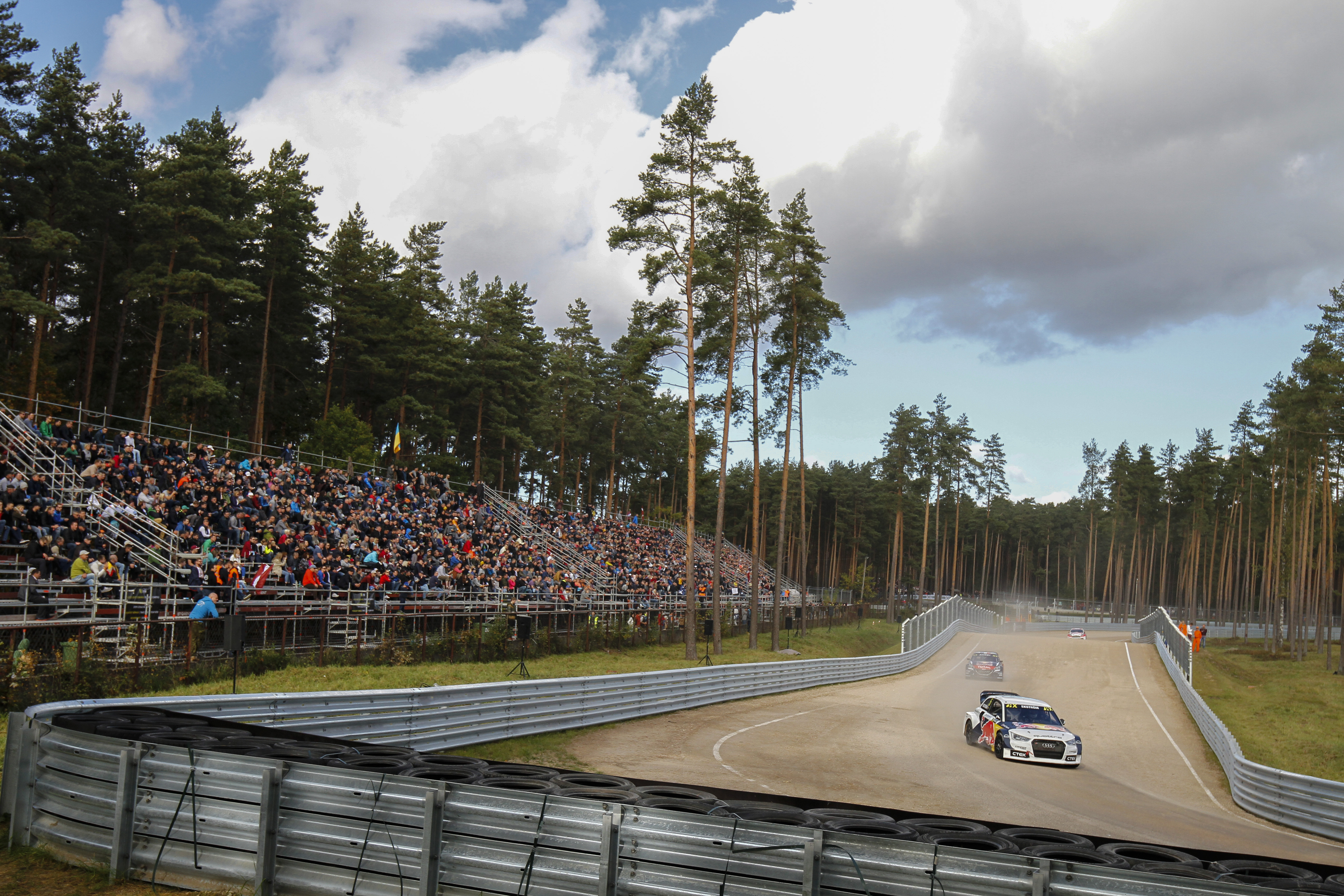
Solberg's failure to score any points dropped him to 3rd in the standings and gifted Ekström a 27-point buffer over Kristoffersson with two rounds left

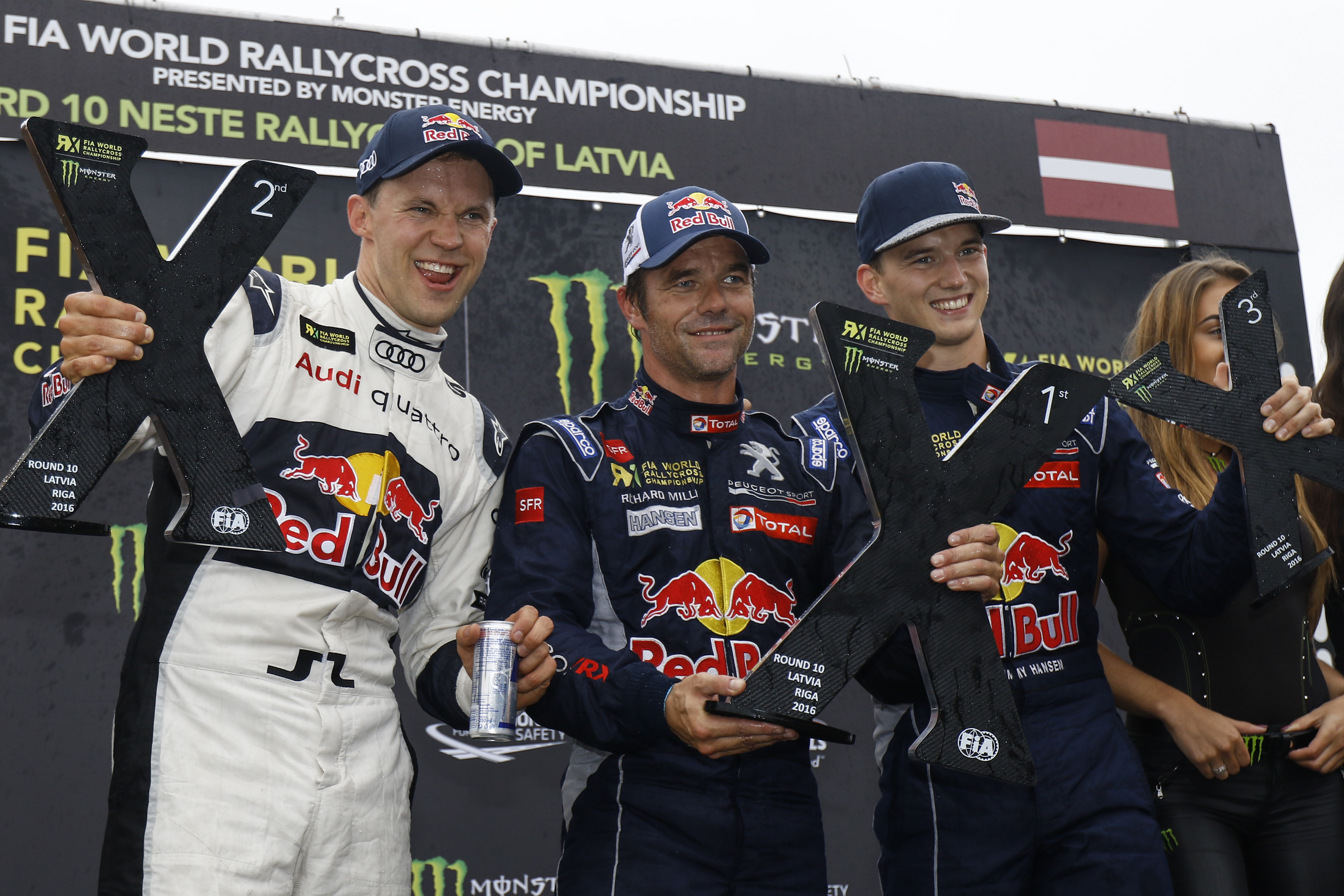
Sébastien Loeb won his first World RX event in Latvia

Pos.	No.	Driver	Team	Car	Q1	Q2	Q3	Q4	Pts
1	3	(Sweden) Johan Kristoffersson	Volkswagen RX Sweden	Volkswagen Polo	6th	1st	1st	7th	16
2	13	(Norway) Andreas Bakkerud	Hoonigan Racing Division	Ford Focus RS	2nd	2nd	3rd	5th	15
3	21	(Sweden) Timmy Hansen	Team Peugeot-Hansen	Peugeot 208	1st	5th	18th	2nd	14
4	5	(Sweden) Mattias Ekström	EKS RX	Audi S1	4th	14th	2nd	4th	13
5	9	(France) Sébastien Loeb	Team Peugeot-Hansen	Peugeot 208	3rd	3rd	17th	3rd	12
6	7	(Russia) Timur Timerzyanov	World RX Team Austria	Ford Fiesta	21st	4th	5th	1st	11
7	6	(Latvia) Jānis Baumanis	World RX Team Austria	Ford Fiesta	9th	8th	4th	9th	10
8	44	(Germany) Timo Scheider	All-Inkl.com Münnich Motorsport	SEAT Ibiza	7th	6th	10th	10th	9
9	57	(Finland) Toomas Heikkinen	EKS RX	Audi S1	14th	7th	8th	6th	8
10	17	(France) Davy Jeanney	Peugeot Hansen Academy	Peugeot 208	8th	9th	7th	15th	7
11	15	(Latvia) Reinis Nitišs	Olsbergs MSE	Ford Fiesta	10th	11th	9th	11th	6
12	4	(Sweden) Robin Larsson	Larsson Jernberg Motorsport	Audi A1	11th	12th	12th	12th	5
13	96	(Sweden) Kevin Eriksson	Olsbergs MSE	Ford Fiesta ST	15th	13th	11th	14th	4
14	37	(United Kingdom) Guy Wilks	JRM Racing	BMW MINI Countryman	17th	16th	6th	16th	3
15	92	(Sweden) Anton Marklund	Volkswagen RX Sweden	Volkswagen Polo	13th	15th	16th	13th	2
16	43	(United States) Ken Block	Hoonigan Racing Division	Ford Focus RS	12th	10th	20th	21st	1
17	10	(Estonia) Janno Ligur	Reinsalu Sport	Ford Fiesta	20th	17th	15th	17th	
18	68	(Finland) Niclas Grönholm	Olsbergs MSE	Ford Fiesta ST	18th	20th	13th	18th	
19	1	(Norway) Petter Solberg	Petter Solberg World RX Team	Citroën DS3	5th	DSQ	14th	8th	
20	25	(Italy) Gigi Galli	Gigi Galli	Kia Rio	19th	19th	21st	20th	
21	65	(France) Guerlain Chicherit	JRM Racing	BMW MINI Countryman	22nd	18th	19th	19th	
22	77	(Germany) René Münnich	All-Inkl.com Münnich Motorsport	SEAT Ibiza	16th	21st	22nd	22nd	
23	88	(Lithuania) Nerijus Naujokaitis	Motorsport LT	Škoda Fabia	23rd	22nd	23rd	23rd	

=== Semi-finals ===
Semi-final 1

Pos.	No.	Driver	Team	Time	Pts
1	9	(France) Sébastien Loeb	Team Peugeot-Hansen	5:33.996	6
2	3	(Sweden) Johan Kristoffersson	Volkswagen RX Sweden	+0.427	5
3	21	(Sweden) Timmy Hansen	Team Peugeot-Hansen	+2.293	4
4	57	(Finland) Toomas Heikkinen	EKS RX	+8.373	3
5	15	(Latvia) Reinis Nitišs	Olsbergs MSE	+11.875	2
6	6	(Latvia) Jānis Baumanis	World RX Team Austria	DNF	1

Semi-final 2

Pos.	No.	Driver	Team	Time	Pts
1	5	(Sweden) Mattias Ekström	EKS RX	5:32.044	6
2	7	(Russia) Timur Timerzyanov	World RX Team Austria	+2.014	5
3	13	(Norway) Andreas Bakkerud	Hoonigan Racing Division	+6.589	4
4	44	(Germany) Timo Scheider	All-Inkl.com Münnich Motorsport	+7.919	3
5	17	(France) Davy Jeanney	Peugeot Hansen Academy	+7.940	2
6	4	(Sweden) Robin Larsson	Larsson Jernberg Motorsport	+14.414	1

=== Final ===
Pos.	No.	Driver	Team	Time/Retired	Pts
1	9	(France) Sébastien Loeb	Team Peugeot-Hansen	5:27.665	8
2	5	(Sweden) Mattias Ekström	EKS RX	+2.305	5
3	21	(Sweden) Timmy Hansen	Team Peugeot-Hansen	+5.429	4
4	13	(Norway) Andreas Bakkerud	Hoonigan Racing Division	+11.104	3
5	3	(Sweden) Johan Kristoffersson	Volkswagen RX Sweden	+14.751	2
6	7	(Russia) Timur Timerzyanov	World RX Team Austria	DNF	1

== RX Lites ==
=== Heats ===
Pos.	No.	Driver	Team	Q1	Q2	Q3	Q4	Pts
1	16	(Norway) Thomas Bryntesson	JC Raceteknik	1st	1st	7th	1st	16
2	13	(France) Cyril Raymond	Olsbergs MSE	11th	2nd	1st	3rd	15
3	52	(Sweden) Simon Olofsson	Simon Olofsson	6th	7th	2nd	2nd	14
4	99	(Norway) Joachim Hvaal	JC Raceteknik	2nd	3rd	9th	7th	13
5	55	(Russia) Vasily Gryazin	Sport Racing Technologies	4th	5th	8th	4th	12
6	56	(Norway) Thomas Holmen	Thomas Holmen	3rd	10th	5th	6th	11
7	33	(Kenya) Tejas Hirani	Olsbergs MSE	5th	9th	3rd	9th	10
8	8	(Norway) Simon Wågø Syversen	Set Promotion	10th	8th	6th	5th	9
9	46	(Latvia) Martins Lapins	JC Raceteknik	7th	6th	4th	11th	8
10	69	(Norway) Sondre Evjen	JC Raceteknik	9th	4th	11th	10th	7
11	121	(United States) Conner Martell	Olsbergs MSE	8th	11th	10th	8th	6

=== Semi-finals ===
Semi-final 1

Pos.	No.	Driver	Team	Time	Pts
1	52	(Sweden) Simon Olofsson	Simon Olofsson	5:50.110	6
2	121	(United States) Conner Martell	Olsbergs MSE	+7.661	5
3	33	(Kenya) Tejas Hirani	Olsbergs MSE	+11.146	4
4	46	(Latvia) Martins Lapins	JC Raceteknik	+22.234	3
5	55	(Russia) Vasily Gryazin	Sport Racing Technologies	+40.440	2
6	16	(Norway) Thomas Bryntesson	JC Raceteknik	DNF	1

Semi-final 2

Pos.	No.	Driver	Team	Time	Pts
1	99	(Norway) Joachim Hvaal	JC Raceteknik	5:55.982	6
2	69	(Norway) Sondre Evjen	JC Raceteknik	+2.776	5
3	56	(Norway) Thomas Holmen	Thomas Holmen	+7.027	4
4	8	(Norway) Simon Wågø Syversen	Set Promotion	+9.430	3
5	13	(France) Cyril Raymond	Olsbergs MSE	+40.144	2

=== Final ===
Pos.	No.	Driver	Team	Time/Retired	Pts
1	69	(Norway) Sondre Evjen	JC Raceteknik	5:58.048	8
2	121	(United States) Conner Martell	Olsbergs MSE	+0.562	5
3	33	(Kenya) Tejas Hirani	Olsbergs MSE	+16.517	4
4	52	(Sweden) Simon Olofsson	Simon Olofsson	DNF	3
5	99	(Norway) Joachim Hvaal	JC Raceteknik	DNF	2
6	56	(Norway) Thomas Holmen	Thomas Holmen	DNF	1

== Standings after the event ==
Supercar standings

Pos	Driver	Pts	Gap
1	(Sweden) Mattias Ekström	228	
2	(Sweden) Johan Kristoffersson	201	+27
3	(Norway) Petter Solberg	194	+34
4	(Norway) Andreas Bakkerud	192	+36
5	(France) Sébastien Loeb	180	+48

RX Lites standings

Pos	Driver	Pts	Gap
1	(France) Cyril Raymond	175	
2	(Norway) Thomas Bryntesson	167	+8
3	(Sweden) Simon Olofsson	151	+24
4	(Norway) Joachim Hvaal	136	+39
5	(Norway) Simon Wågø Syversen	115	+60

- Note: Only the top five positions are included.

Previous race: 2016 World RX of Barcelona	FIA World Rallycross Championship; 2016 season	Next race: 2016 World RX of Germany
Previous race: None	World RX of Latvia	Next race: 2017 World RX of Latvia
