= 2022 World RX of Catalunya =

Rallycross championship event

- Round 8 of 10 in the 2022 FIA World Rallycross Championship
- Date: 29 October 2022
- Location: Montmeló
- Venue: Circuit de Barcelona-Catalunya

Results
Heat winners
- Heat 1: (Sweden) Johan Kristoffersson; Kristoffersson Motorsport
- Heat 2: (Sweden) Johan Kristoffersson; Kristoffersson Motorsport
Semi-final winners
- Semi-final 1: (Sweden) Johan Kristoffersson; Kristoffersson Motorsport
- Semi-final 2: (Sweden) Kevin Hansen; Hansen World RX Team
Final
- First: (Sweden) Timmy Hansen; Hansen World RX Team
- Second: (Finland) Niclas Grönholm; Construction Equipment Dealer Team
- Third: (Sweden) Gustav Bergström; Gustav Bergström

Rallycross layout of the Circuit de Catalunya

2022 World RX of Catalunya
- Round 9 of 10 in the 2022 FIA World Rallycross Championship
- Date: 30 October 2022
- Location: Montmeló
- Venue: Circuit de Barcelona-Catalunya

Results
Heat winners
- Heat 1: (Sweden) Johan Kristoffersson; Kristoffersson Motorsport
- Heat 2: (Sweden) Johan Kristoffersson; Kristoffersson Motorsport
Semi-final winners
- Semi-final 1: (Finland) Niclas Grönholm; Construction Equipment Dealer Team
- Semi-final 2: (Sweden) Timmy Hansen; Hansen World RX Team
Final
- First: (Sweden) Johan Kristoffersson; Kristoffersson Motorsport
- Second: (Sweden) Timmy Hansen; Hansen World RX Team
- Third: (Norway) Ole Christian Veiby; Kristoffersson Motorsport

The 2022 World RX of Catalunya was the eighth and ninth round of the ninth season of the FIA World Rallycross Championship. The event was double-header (two races in a weekend) held at the Circuit de Barcelona-Catalunya in Montmeló, Catalonia. Johan Kristoffersson clinched his fifth FIA World Rallycross Championship crown – and the first of the series’ new electric era – at World RX of Catalunya (30 October).

== World RX1e Championship Race 1 ==
=== Heats ===
Pos.	No.	Driver	Team	Car	Q1	Q2
1	1	(Sweden) Johan Kristoffersson	Kristoffersson Motorsport	Volkswagen Polo RX1e	1st	1st
2	71	(Sweden) Kevin Hansen	Hansen World RX Team	Peugeot 208 RX1e	3rd	2nd
3	21	(Sweden) Timmy Hansen	Hansen World RX Team	Peugeot 208 RX1e	2nd	3rd
4	68	(Finland) Niclas Grönholm	Construction Equipment Dealer Team	PWR RX1e	5th	4th
5	17	(Sweden) Gustav Bergström	Gustav Bergström	Volkswagen Polo RX1e	4th	6th
6	12	(Sweden) Klara Andersson	Construction Equipment Dealer Team	PWR RX1e	6th	5th
7	77	(Germany) René Münnich	ALL-INKL.COM Münnich Motorsport	SEAT Ibiza RX1e	DNF	DNF
8	52	(Norway) Ole Christian Veiby	Kristoffersson Motorsport	Volkswagen Polo RX1e	DNS	DNS

=== Progression ===
Race 1

Pos.	No.	Driver	Team	Time
1	1	(Sweden) Johan Kristoffersson	Kristoffersson Motorsport	4:17.627
2	21	(Sweden) Timmy Hansen	Hansen World RX Team	+ 0.135
3	17	(Sweden) Gustav Bergström	Gustav Bergström	+ 1.237
DNF	77	(Germany) René Münnich	ALL-INKL.COM Münnich Motorsport	+ 2 laps

Race 2

Pos.	No.	Driver	Team	Time
1	71	(Sweden) Kevin Hansen	Hansen World RX Team	4:14.206
2	68	(Finland) Niclas Grönholm	Construction Equipment Dealer Team	+ 0.633
3	52	(Norway) Ole Christian Veiby	Kristoffersson Motorsport	+ 1.980
4	12	(Sweden) Klara Andersson	Construction Equipment Dealer Team	+ 2.652

=== Semi-finals ===
Semi-Final 1

Pos.	No.	Driver	Team	Time	Pts
1	1	(Sweden) Johan Kristoffersson	Kristoffersson Motorsport	4:11.954	
2	68	(Finland) Niclas Grönholm	Construction Equipment Dealer Team	+ 2.510	
3*	17	(Sweden) Gustav Bergström	Gustav Bergström	+ 5.691	
4(7)	12	(Sweden) Klara Andersson	Construction Equipment Dealer Team	+ 10.301	9

Semi-Final 2

Pos.	No.	Driver	Team	Time	Pts
1	71	(Sweden) Kevin Hansen	Hansen World RX Team	4:11.419	
2	21	(Sweden) Timmy Hansen	Hansen World RX Team	+ 0.490	
3(6)	52	(Norway) Ole Christian Veiby	Kristoffersson Motorsport	+ 2.398	10
4(8)	77	(Germany) René Münnich	ALL-INKL.COM Münnich Motorsport	+ 8.187	8

- Note: Gustav Bergström progressed to the Final race as one of two placed third Semi-Finals drivers with better result in Progression Round.

=== Final ===
Pos.	No.	Driver	Team	Time	Pts
1	1	(Sweden) Timmy Hansen	Hansen World RX Team	4:10.163	20
2	68	(Finland) Niclas Grönholm	Construction Equipment Dealer Team	+ 0.516	16
3	17	(Sweden) Gustav Bergström	Gustav Bergström	+ 3.885	13
4	71	(Sweden) Kevin Hansen	Hansen World RX Team	+ 7.880	12
5	1	(Sweden) Johan Kristoffersson	Kristoffersson Motorsport	+ 7.924	11

== World RX1e Championship Race 2 ==
=== Heats ===
Pos.	No.	Driver	Team	Car	Q1	Q2
1	1	(Sweden) Johan Kristoffersson	Kristoffersson Motorsport	Volkswagen Polo RX1e	1st	1st
2	21	(Sweden) Timmy Hansen	Hansen World RX Team	Peugeot 208 RX1e	2nd	2nd
3	52	(Norway) Ole Christian Veiby	Kristoffersson Motorsport	Volkswagen Polo RX1e	4th	3rd
4	68	(Finland) Niclas Grönholm	Construction Equipment Dealer Team	PWR RX1e	3rd	5th
5	71	(Sweden) Kevin Hansen	Hansen World RX Team	Peugeot 208 RX1e	5th	4th
6	17	(Sweden) Gustav Bergström	Gustav Bergström	Volkswagen Polo RX1e	6th	6th
7	12	(Sweden) Klara Andersson	Construction Equipment Dealer Team	PWR RX1e	7th	7th
8	77	(Germany) René Münnich	ALL-INKL.COM Münnich Motorsport	SEAT Ibiza RX1e	8th	8th

=== Progression ===
Race 1

Pos.	No.	Driver	Team	Time
1	1	(Sweden) Johan Kristoffersson	Kristoffersson Motorsport	3:57.644
2	52	(Norway) Ole Christian Veiby	Kristoffersson Motorsport	+ 5.090
3	12	(Sweden) Klara Andersson	Construction Equipment Dealer Team	+ 7.421
4	71	(Sweden) Kevin Hansen	Hansen World RX Team	+ 8.889

Race 2

Pos.	No.	Driver	Team	Time
1	21	(Sweden) Timmy Hansen	Hansen World RX Team	4:00.306
2	68	(Finland) Niclas Grönholm	Construction Equipment Dealer Team	+ 2.795
3	17	(Sweden) Gustav Bergström	Gustav Bergström	+ 3.807
4	77	(Germany) René Münnich	ALL-INKL.COM Münnich Motorsport	+ 8.950

=== Semi-finals ===
Semi-Final 1

Pos.	No.	Driver	Team	Time	Pts
1	1	(Sweden) Johan Kristoffersson	Kristoffersson Motorsport	4:05.664	
2	12	(Sweden) Klara Andersson	Construction Equipment Dealer Team	+ 1.744	
3*	68	(Finland) Niclas Grönholm	Construction Equipment Dealer Team	+ 7.575	
4(8)	77	(Germany) René Münnich	ALL-INKL.COM Münnich Motorsport	+ 8.132	8

Semi-Final 2

Pos.	No.	Driver	Team	Time	Pts
1	21	(Sweden) Timmy Hansen	Hansen World RX Team	3:59.498	
2	52	(Norway) Ole Christian Veiby	Kristoffersson Motorsport	+ 2.859	
3(6)	71	(Sweden) Kevin Hansen	Hansen World RX Team	+ 3.191	10
4(7)	17	(Sweden) Gustav Bergström	Gustav Bergström	+ 4.361	9

- Note: Niclas Grönholm progressed to the Final race as one of two placed trird Semi-Finals drivers with better result in Progression Round.

=== Final ===
Pos.	No.	Driver	Team	Time	Pts
1	1	(Sweden) Johan Kristoffersson	Kristoffersson Motorsport	3:55.209	20
2	21	(Sweden) Timmy Hansen	Hansen World RX Team	+ 5.112	16
3	52	(Norway) Ole Christian Veiby	Kristoffersson Motorsport	+ 6.325	13
4	12	(Sweden) Klara Andersson	Construction Equipment Dealer Team	+ 7.562	12
5	68	(Finland) Niclas Grönholm	Construction Equipment Dealer Team	DNF	11

== Standings after the event ==
Pos.	Driver	Pts	Gap
WC	(Sweden) Johan Kristoffersson	162	
2	(Sweden) Timmy Hansen	123	+39
3	(Finland) Niclas Grönholm	114	+48
4	(Sweden) Kevin Hansen	112	+50
5	(Norway) Ole Christian Veiby	112	+50

- Note: Only the top five positions are included.

Previous race: 2022 World RX of Benelux	FIA World Rallycross Championship; 2022 season	Next race: 2022 World RX of Germany
Previous race: 2021 World RX of Barcelona-Catalunya	World RX of Catalunya	Next race: -
