= Volkswagen RX Sweden =

Swedish auto racing team

(Sweden) Kristoffersson Motorsport
- Founded: 2013
- Team principal(s): Tommy Kristoffersson
- Current series: FIA World Rallycross Championship; Scandinavian Touring Car Championship
- Current drivers: FIA World Rallycross Championship: 1. (Sweden) Johan Kristoffersson; 11. (Norway) Petter Solberg; Scandinavian Touring Car Championship: 3. (Sweden) Johan Kristoffersson; 9. (Sweden) Fredrik Blomstedt; 30. (Sweden) Fredrik Ekblom

Kristoffersson Motorsport is a Swedish auto racing team owned by racing driver Tommy Kristoffersson. It currently competes in the FIA World Rallycross Championship and Swedish Touring Car Championship, with Tommy's son Johan Kristoffersson as one of the drivers. The team has raced under several sponsored names, such as Team Biogas.se, Volkswagen Dealer Team KMS, Volkswagen Team Sweden, Volkswagen RX Sweden and PSRX Volkswagen Sweden.

== Rallycross ==
Tommy Kristoffersson competed with a self-run Audis at the Swedish Rallycross Championship and the FIA European Rallycross Championship (ERX) in the 1980s and 1990s. He won the Swedish championship in 1989, 1991 and 1992, whereas he placed third in the 1993 ERX and fourth in 1991.

In 2013, Johan Kristoffersson and Pontus Tidemand entered the Swedish round of the 2013 FIA European Rallycross Championship with a Volkswagen Scirocco.

In 2014, Kristoffersson drove a Volkswagen Polo at three rounds of the ERX, winning a race, as well as and four rounds of the FIA World Rallycross Championship (WRX). In addition, Ole Christian Veiby entered two WRX rounds and one ERX round.

In 2015, Volkswagen Team Sweden was one of two teams officially supported by Volkswagen Motorsport in the WRX along with Marklund Motorsport. Johan Kristoffersson finished third, and Tord Linnerud finished 14th. Ole Christian Veiby finished third in the 2015 ERX, and entered one WRX round.

Kristoffersson and Marklund combined their operations to participate in the 2016 WRX Championship under the brand Volkswagen RX Sweden. Johan Kristoffersson was runner-up, whereas Anton Marklund finished 13th.

Kristoffersson signed a partnership with the squad of Petter Solberg for the 2017 WRX season, under the name PSRX Volkswagen World RX Team Sweden and is currently headquartered in Torsby. Kristoffersson took six wins and the title, whereas Solberg finished third with one win and three podiums.

== STCC ==
Kristoffersson joined the Swedish Touring Car Championship in 1998, with Tommy Kristoffersson ranking fourth and Mats Lindén fifth with an Audi A4 Quattro. Mattias Ekström won the 1999 title, whereas Kristoffersson finished 9th. In 2000, Fredrik Ekblom was runner-up and Kristoffersson was 8th. Roberto Colciago was the 2001 champion, while Kristoffersson resulted fourth. Colciago defended his title in 2002, Kristoffersson finished 6th and Marius Erlandsen finished 10th.

With the new Audi A4 for the 2003 season, Fredrik Ekblom won the third consecutive title for the team, Tobias Johansson ended 6th and Kristoffersson 7th. In 2004, Ekblom finished third and Kristoffersson 8th. Ekblom ended 6th in 2005 and Kristoffersson 10th. In 2006, Thed Björk won the championship, Ekblom finished 4th and Kristoffersson finished 10th. in 2007, Björk finished 4th, Frank Stippler was 7th and Kristoffersson 14th.

In 2008, Audi dropped factory support to the team. Kristoffersson missed three races and finished 14th, whereas Alexander Lvov finished 19th.

For the 2009 STCC season, Tommy Kristoffersson retired as Johan Kristoffersson replaced him to become the team's new lead driver. Driving an Audi A4, he finished 18th overall and runner-up in the privateers cup, whereas Andreas Simonsen entered two rounds.

In 2010, the Kristoffersson began to operate the Team Biogas.se team, replacing Brovallen Motorsport, switching to Volkswagen Scirocco cars. Ekblom finished third and Patrik Olsson finished sixth, whereas Johan Kristoffersson entered the last three rounds. In 2011, Ekblom was runner-up and Olsson was ninth. Kristoffersson competed in the second half of the season, finishing 10th.

Kristoffersson Motorsport stayed loyal to the STCC in 2012, while rival teams created the TTA – Racing Elite League. Johan Kristoffersson won the championship with the Volkswagen Scirocco, whereas Jordi Gené finished 7th. When both championships merged in 2013 and adopted TTA technical regulations, Kristoffersson decided to close their touring car program.

With Volkswagen Sweden factory support, Kristoffersson Motorsport returned to the STCC in 2017 with the Volkswagen Golf GTI TCR. Fredrik Ekblom was runner-up and Fredrik Blomstedt finished third, whereas Johan Kristoffersson ranked fourth despite entering only four of the seven rounds.

Johan Kristoffersson won the 2018 championship with three wins and seven podiums in 12 races. His teammates Hugo Nerman and Nicklas Oscarsson finished 9th and 15th with no podiums.

== Racing record ==
=== FIA European Rallycross Championship results ===
(key)

==== Supercar ====
Year	Entrant	Car	No.	Driver	1	2	3	4	5	6	7	8	9	ERX	Points
2013	Volkswagen Dealer Team KMS	Volkswagen Scirocco	61	(Sweden) Johan Kristoffersson	GBR	POR	FRA	NOR	SWE; 10	BEL	NED	AUT	POL	28th	11
2013	Volkswagen Dealer Team KMS	Volkswagen Scirocco	62	(Sweden) Pontus Tidemand	GBR	POR	FRA	NOR	SWE; 26	BEL	NED	AUT	POL	45th	0
2014	Volkswagen Dealer Team KMS	Volkswagen Polo	52	(Norway) Ole Christian Veiby	GBR	NOR	BEL; 10	GER	ITA					29th	7
2014	Volkswagen Dealer Team KMS	Volkswagen Polo	53	(Sweden) Johan Kristoffersson	GBR	NOR	BEL; DSQ	GER; 3	ITA; 1					8th	30
2015	Volkswagen Team Sweden	Volkswagen Polo	52	(Norway) Ole Christian Veiby	BEL; 2	GER; 7	NOR; 18	BAR; 1	ITA; 3					3rd	86

=== Complete FIA World Rallycross Championship results ===
(key)

==== Supercar ====
Year	Entrant	Car	No.	Driver	1	2	3	4	5	6	7	8	9	10	11	12	13	WRX	Points	Teams	Points
2014	Volkswagen Dealer Team KMS	Volkswagen Polo	52	(Norway) Ole Christian Veiby	POR	GBR	NOR	FIN	SWE; 21	BEL; 19	CAN	FRA	GER	ITA	TUR	ARG		NC	0	N/A	N/A
2014	Volkswagen Dealer Team KMS	Volkswagen Polo	53	(Sweden) Johan Kristoffersson	POR	GBR	NOR	FIN	SWE; 20	BEL; 3	CAN	FRA	GER; 8	ITA; 5	TUR	ARG		15th	33	N/A	N/A
2015	Volkswagen Team Sweden	Volkswagen Polo	3	(Sweden) Johan Kristoffersson	POR; 1	HOC; 8	BEL; 7	GBR; 3	GER; 4	SWE; 11	CAN; 11	NOR; 10	FRA; 4	BAR; 2	TUR; 3	ITA; 2	ARG; 13	3rd	234	4th	291
2015	Volkswagen Team Sweden	Volkswagen Polo	52	(Norway) Ole Christian Veiby	POR	HOC	BEL	GBR	GER	SWE; 9	CAN	NOR	FRA	BAR	TUR	ITA	ARG; 10	19th	19	4th	291
2015	Volkswagen Team Sweden	Volkswagen Polo	99	(Norway) Tord Linnerud	POR; 16	HOC; 11	BEL; 12	GBR; 9	GER; 5	SWE; 21	CAN; 20	NOR; 15	FRA; 18	BAR; 12	TUR; 11	ITA; 11	ARG	14th	49	4th	291
2016	Volkswagen RX Sweden	Volkswagen Polo	3	(Sweden) Johan Kristoffersson	POR; 6	HOC; 7	BEL; 6	GBR; 12	NOR; 7	SWE; 5	CAN; 3	FRA; 1	BAR; 6	LAT; 5	GER; 6	ARG; 2		2nd	240	3rd	316
2016	Volkswagen RX Sweden	Volkswagen Polo	92	(Sweden) Anton Marklund	POR; 9	HOC; 15	BEL; 4	GBR; 9	NOR; 15	SWE; 4	CAN; 6	FRA; 18	BAR; 14	LAT; 15	GER; 15	ARG; 11		13th	76	3rd	316
2016	Volkswagen RX Sweden	Volkswagen Polo	34	(United States) Tanner Foust	POR	HOC	BEL	GBR; 22	NOR	SWE	CAN	FRA	BAR	LAT	GER; 18	ARG		29th	0	N/A	N/A
2017	PSRX Volkswagen Sweden	Volkswagen Polo GTI	3	(Sweden) Johan Kristoffersson	BAR; 6	POR; 3	HOC; 2	BEL; 1	GBR; 2	NOR; 1	SWE; 1	CAN; 1	FRA; 1	LAT; 1	GER; 7	RSA; 1		1st	316	1st	544
2017	PSRX Volkswagen Sweden	Volkswagen Polo GTI	11	(Norway) Petter Solberg	BAR; 4	POR; 6	HOC; 4	BEL; 3	GBR; 1	NOR; 7	SWE; 7	CAN; 2	FRA; 5	LAT; 7	GER; 4	RSA; 4		3rd	252	1st	544
2017	PSRX Volkswagen Sweden	Volkswagen Polo GTI	94	(Germany) Dieter Depping	BAR	POR	HOC	BEL	GBR	NOR	SWE	CAN	FRA	LAT	GER; 16	RSA		26th	1	1st	544
2018	PSRX Volkswagen Sweden	Volkswagen Polo R	1	(Sweden) Johan Kristoffersson	BAR; 1	POR; 1	BEL; 5	GBR; 1	NOR; 1	SWE; 1	CAN; 1	FRA; 1	LAT; 1	USA; 1	GER; 1	RSA; 1		1st	341	1st	568
2018	PSRX Volkswagen Sweden	Volkswagen Polo R	11	(Norway) Petter Solberg	BAR; 5	POR; 3	BEL; 2	GBR; 7	NOR; 3	SWE; 7	CAN; 5	FRA; 3	LAT; 7	USA; 2	GER; 5	RSA; 5		5th	227	1st	568
2020	Volkswagen Dealerteam BAUHAUS	Volkswagen Polo R	3	(Sweden) Johan Kristoffersson	SWE; 1	SWE; 3	FIN; 1	FIN; 4	LAT; 1	LAT; 2	ESP; 2	ESP; 1						1st	219	N/A	N/A
2022	Kristoffersson Motorsport	Volkswagen Polo RX1e	1	(Sweden) Johan Kristoffersson	NOR; 1	LAT; 1	LAT; 1	POR; 1	POR; 5	BEL; 1	BEL; 1	ESP; 4	ESP; 1	GER; 1				1st	183	1st	306
2022	Kristoffersson Motorsport	Volkswagen Polo RX1e	52	(Norway) Ole Christian Veiby	NOR; 3	LAT; 4	LAT; 3	POR; 2	POR; 2	BEL; 8	BEL; 5	ESP; 6	ESP; 3	GER; 4				4th	124	1st	306
2022	Kristoffersson Motorsport	Volkswagen Polo RX1e	17	(Sweden) Gustav Bergström	NOR; 6	LAT; 5	LAT; 6	POR; 5	POR; 8	BEL; 3	BEL; 3	ESP; 3	ESP; 7	GER; 7				6th	107	N/A	N/A
2023	Kristoffersson Motorsport	Volkswagen Polo RX1e OMSE ZEROID X1 (Note: All drivers competed in OMSE ZEROID X1 cars for the final four rounds in Hong Kong and South Africa.)	1	(Sweden) Johan Kristoffersson	POR; 1	NOR; 1	SWE; 1	GBR; C	BEL; C	GER; C	RSA; 1	RSA; 3	CHN; 6	CHN; 1				1st	141	1st	104
2023	Kristoffersson Motorsport	Volkswagen Polo RX1e OMSE ZEROID X1	96	(Norway) Ole Christian Veiby	POR; 4	NOR; 6	SWE; 3	GBR; C	BLX; C	GER; C	RSA; 6	RSA; 7	CHN; 4	CHN; 2				5th	82	1st	104
2023	Kristoffersson Motorsport	Volkswagen Polo RX1e OMSE ZEROID X1	17	(Sweden) Gustav Bergström	POR; 10	NOR; 8	SWE; 10	GBR	BEL; C	GER; C	RSA	RSA	CHN	CHN				12th	20	N/A	N/A
2023	Kristoffersson Motorsport	Volkswagen Polo RX1e OMSE ZEROID X1	19	(Sweden) Mikaela Åhlin-Kottulinsky	POR	NOR	SWE	GBR	BEL	GER	RSA	RSA	CHN; 10	CHN; 9				13th	13	N/A	N/A
2023	Kristoffersson Motorsport	Volkswagen Polo RX1e OMSE ZEROID X1	69	(Norway) Sondre Evjen	POR	NOR	SWE	GBR; C	BEL	GER	RSA	RSA	CHN	CHN				NC	0	N/A	N/A

^{*} Season still in progress.
