= 2022 World RX of Norway =

Rallycross championship event

- Round 1 of 10 in the 2022 FIA World Rallycross Championship
- Date: 13–14 August 2022
- Location: Hell, Nord-Trøndelag
- Venue: Lånkebanen

Results
Heat winners
- Heat 1: (Sweden) Johan Kristoffersson; Kristoffersson Motorsport
- Heat 2: (Sweden) Timmy Hansen; Hansen World RX Team
- Heat 3: (Sweden) Johan Kristoffersson; Kristoffersson Motorsport
Semi-final winners
- Semi-final 1: (Norway) Ole Christian Veiby; Kristoffersson Motorsport
- Semi-final 2: (Finland) Niclas Grönholm; Construction Equipment Dealer Team
Final
- First: (Sweden) Johan Kristoffersson; Kristoffersson Motorsport
- Second: (Sweden) Timmy Hansen; Hansen World RX Team
- Third: (Norway) Ole Christian Veiby; Kristoffersson Motorsport

World RX layout of Lånkebanen

The 2022 Ramudden World RX of Norway was the first round of the ninth season of the FIA World Rallycross Championship. It was also inaugural race in new RX1e top category. The event was held at the Lånkebanen near Hell, Nord-Trøndelag. The World RallyCross Championship's electric era started at Norway's Hell track on 13-14 August after delays to allow teams to ready their new cars.

== World RX1e Championship ==
=== Heats ===
Pos.	No.	Driver	Team	Car	Q1	Q2	Q3
1	1	(Sweden) Johan Kristoffersson	Kristoffersson Motorsport	Volkswagen Polo RX1e	1st	2nd	1st
2	21	(Sweden) Timmy Hansen	Hansen World RX Team	Peugeot 208 RX1e	2nd	1st	2nd
3	71	(Sweden) Kevin Hansen	Hansen World RX Team	Peugeot 208 RX1e	3rd	3rd	3rd
4	52	(Norway) Ole Christian Veiby	Kristoffersson Motorsport	Volkswagen Polo RX1e	4th	5th	5th
5	68	(Finland) Niclas Grönholm	Construction Equipment Dealer Team	PWR RX1e	5th	4th	6th
6	12	(Sweden) Klara Andersson	Construction Equipment Dealer Team	PWR RX1e	6th	DNF	4th
7	17	(Sweden) Gustav Bergström	Gustav Bergström	Volkswagen Polo RX1e	DNF	6th	7th
8	77	(Germany) René Münnich	ALL-INKL.COM Münnich Motorsport	SEAT Ibiza RX1e	7th	7th	DNF

=== Progression ===
Race 1

Pos.	No.	Driver	Team	Time
1	1	(Sweden) Johan Kristoffersson	Kristoffersson Motorsport	3:18.491
2	71	(Sweden) Kevin Hansen	Hansen World RX Team	+ 0.402
3	17	(Sweden) Gustav Bergström	Gustav Bergström	+ 3.276
DNF	68	(Finland) Niclas Grönholm	Construction Equipment Dealer Team	+ 5 laps

Race 2

Pos.	No.	Driver	Team	Time
1	21	(Sweden) Timmy Hansen	Hansen World RX Team	3:19.492
2	52	(Norway) Ole Christian Veiby	Kristoffersson Motorsport	+ 1.353
3	12	(Sweden) Klara Andersson	Construction Equipment Dealer Team	+ 2.143
4	77	(Germany) René Münnich	ALL-INKL.COM Münnich Motorsport	+ 17.346

=== Semi-finals ===
Semi-Final 1

Pos.	No.	Driver	Team	Time	Pts
1	52	(Norway) Ole Christian Veiby	Kristoffersson Motorsport	3:23.832	
2	1	(Sweden) Johan Kristoffersson	Kristoffersson Motorsport	+ 0.281	
3(6)	17	(Sweden) Gustav Bergström	Gustav Bergström	+ 3.560	10
4(8)	77	(Germany) René Münnich	ALL-INKL.COM Münnich Motorsport	+ 4 laps	8

Semi-Final 2

Pos.	No.	Driver	Team	Time	Pts
1	68	(Finland) Niclas Grönholm	Construction Equipment Dealer Team	3:20.176	
2	21	(Sweden) Timmy Hansen	Hansen World RX Team	+ 0.626	
3*	12	(Sweden) Klara Andersson	Construction Equipment Dealer Team	+ 2.716	
4(7)	71	(Sweden) Kevin Hansen	Hansen World RX Team	+ 2 laps	9

- Note: Klara Andersson progressed to the Final race as one of two placed third Semi-Finals drivers with better result in Progression Round.

=== Final ===
Pos.	No.	Driver	Team	Time	Pts
1	1	(Sweden) Johan Kristoffersson	Kristoffersson Motorsport	3:17.885	20
2	21	(Sweden) Timmy Hansen	Hansen World RX Team	+ 3.692	16
3	52	(Norway) Ole Christian Veiby	Kristoffersson Motorsport	+ 4.057	13
4	12	(Sweden) Klara Andersson	Construction Equipment Dealer Team	+ 5.049	12
5	68	(Finland) Niclas Grönholm	Construction Equipment Dealer Team	+ 5.332	11

== Standings after the event ==
Pos.	Driver	Pts	Gap
1	(Sweden) Johan Kristoffersson	20	
2	(Sweden) Timmy Hansen	16	+4
3	(Norway) Ole Christian Veiby	13	+7
4	(Sweden) Klara Andersson	12	+8
5	(Finland) Niclas Grönholm	11	+9

- Note: Only the top five positions are included.

Previous race: 2021 World RX of Germany	FIA World Rallycross Championship; 2022 season	Next race: 2022 World RX of Riga-Latvia
Previous race: 2019 World RX of Norway	World RX of Norway	Next race: -
