= 2017 World RX of Latvia =

Rallycross series held in Latvia

- Round 10 of 12 in the 2017 FIA World Rallycross Championship
- Date: 16–17 September 2017
- Location: Riga, Latvia
- Venue: Biķernieku Kompleksā Sporta Bāze

Results
Heat winners
- Heat 1: Johan Kristoffersson; PSRX Volkswagen Sweden
- Heat 2: (Finland) Toomas Heikkinen; EKS RX
- Heat 3: Johan Kristoffersson; PSRX Volkswagen Sweden
- Heat 4: (France) Sébastien Loeb; Team Peugeot-Hansen
Semi-final winners
- Semi-final 1: Johan Kristoffersson; PSRX Volkswagen Sweden
- Semi-final 2: (France) Sébastien Loeb; Team Peugeot-Hansen
Final
- First: Johan Kristoffersson; PSRX Volkswagen Sweden
- Second: (Sweden) Mattias Ekström; EKS RX
- Third: (France) Sébastien Loeb; Team Peugeot-Hansen

World RX layout of Biķernieku Kompleksā Sporta Bāze

The 2017 World RX of Latvia was the tenth round of the fourth season of the FIA World Rallycross Championship. The event was held at Biķernieku Kompleksā Sporta Bāze, in the Latvian capital of Riga. Johan Kristoffersson secured the drivers' title, after winning the event. Kristoffersson's closest rival for the title, teammate Petter Solberg, was involved in a first lap crash with Jānis Baumanis in semi-final 2. The semi-final was red-flagged as Solberg was taken to a hospital in Riga. At the hospital it was determined that he had broken two ribs and his left collarbone.

== Supercar ==
=== Heats ===
Pos.	No.	Driver	Team	Car	Q1	Q2	Q3	Q4	Pts
1	3	(Sweden) Johan Kristoffersson	PSRX Volkswagen Sweden	Volkswagen Polo GTI	1st	6th	1st	5th	16
2	9	(France) Sébastien Loeb	Team Peugeot-Hansen	Peugeot 208	10th	3rd	3rd	1st	15
3	1	(Sweden) Mattias Ekström	EKS RX	Audi S1	3rd	4th	10th	2nd	14
4	11	(Norway) Petter Solberg	PSRX Volkswagen Sweden	Volkswagen Polo GTI	2nd	16th	2nd	3rd	13
5	13	(Norway) Andreas Bakkerud	Hoonigan Racing Division	Ford Focus RS	7th	2nd	8th	4th	12
6	57	(Finland) Toomas Heikkinen	EKS RX	Audi S1	5th	1st	7th	12th	11
7	21	(Sweden) Timmy Hansen	Team Peugeot-Hansen	Peugeot 208	4th	5th	11th	6th	10
8	71	(Sweden) Kevin Hansen	Team Peugeot-Hansen	Peugeot 208	6th	11th	4th	9th	9
9	15	(Latvia) Reinis Nitišs	EKS RX	Audi S1	8th	7th	9th	8th	8
10	51	(Switzerland) Nico Müller	EKS RX	Audi S1	9th	12th	6th	11th	7
11	68	(Finland) Niclas Grönholm	GRX	Ford Fiesta	14th	9th	15th	10th	6
12	6	(Latvia) Jānis Baumanis	STARD	Ford Fiesta	13th	8th	14th	15th	5
13	7	(Russia) Timur Timerzyanov	STARD	Ford Fiesta	12th	10th	13th	16th	4
14	43	(United States) Ken Block	Hoonigan Racing Division	Ford Focus RS	11th	13th	16th	13th	3
15	44	(Germany) Timo Scheider	MJP Racing Team Austria	Ford Fiesta	16th	DNS	5th	7th	2
16	84	(France) "Knapick"	Hervé "Knapick" Lemonnier	Citroën DS3	20th	15th	20th	18th	1
17	10	(Hungary) "Csucsu"	Speedy Motorsport	Kia Rio	19th	14th	19th	DNF	
18	96	(Sweden) Kevin Eriksson	MJP Racing Team Austria	Ford Fiesta	15th	DNS	12th	14th	
19	60	(Finland) Joni-Pekka Rajala	Vaaranmaa Racing	Mitsubishi Mirage	18th	DSQ	18th	17th	
20	67	(Belgium) François Duval	DA Racing	Peugeot 208	17th	DSQ	17th	DNF	

=== Semi-finals ===
Semi-final 1

Pos.	No.	Driver	Team	Time	Pts
1	3	(Sweden) Johan Kristoffersson	PSRX Volkswagen Sweden	05:05.006	6
2	1	(Sweden) Mattias Ekström	EKS RX	+2.285	5
3	13	(Norway) Andreas Bakkerud	Hoonigan Racing Division	+4.641	4
4	68	(Finland) Niclas Grönholm	GRX	+7.185	3
5	21	(Sweden) Timmy Hansen	Team Peugeot-Hansen	+7.931	2
6	15	(Latvia) Reinis Nitišs	EKS RX	+8.687	1

Semi-final 2

Pos.	No.	Driver	Team	Time	Pts
1	9	(France) Sébastien Loeb	Team Peugeot-Hansen	05:08.446	6
2	51	(Switzerland) Nico Müller	EKS RX	+4.442	5
3	6	(Latvia) Jānis Baumanis	STARD	+5.329	4
4	71	(Sweden) Kevin Hansen	Team Peugeot-Hansen	+6.604	3
5	57	(Finland) Toomas Heikkinen	EKS RX	+01.04.714	2
6	11	(Norway) Petter Solberg	PSRX Volkswagen Sweden	DNF	1

=== Final ===
Pos.	No.	Driver	Team	Time/Retired	Pts
1	3	(Sweden) Johan Kristoffersson	PSRX Volkswagen Sweden	05:06.673	8
2	1	(Sweden) Mattias Ekström	EKS RX	+2.365	5
3	9	(France) Sébastien Loeb	Team Peugeot-Hansen	+3.919	4
4	13	(Norway) Andreas Bakkerud	Hoonigan Racing Division	+4.534	3
5	6	(Latvia) Jānis Baumanis	STARD	+10.053	2
6	51	(Switzerland) Nico Müller	EKS RX	+20.976	1

== Standings after the event ==
Pos.	Driver	Pts	Gap
WC	(Sweden) Johan Kristoffersson	271	
2	(Norway) Petter Solberg	209	+62
3	(Sweden) Mattias Ekström	204	+67
4	(France) Sébastien Loeb	194	+77
5	(Norway) Andreas Bakkerud	165	+106

- Note: Only the top five positions are included.

Previous race: 2017 World RX of France	FIA World Rallycross Championship; 2017 season	Next race: 2017 World RX of Germany
Previous race: 2016 World RX of Latvia	World RX of Latvia	Next race: 2018 World RX of Latvia
