= Niclas Grönholm =

Finnish rally driver

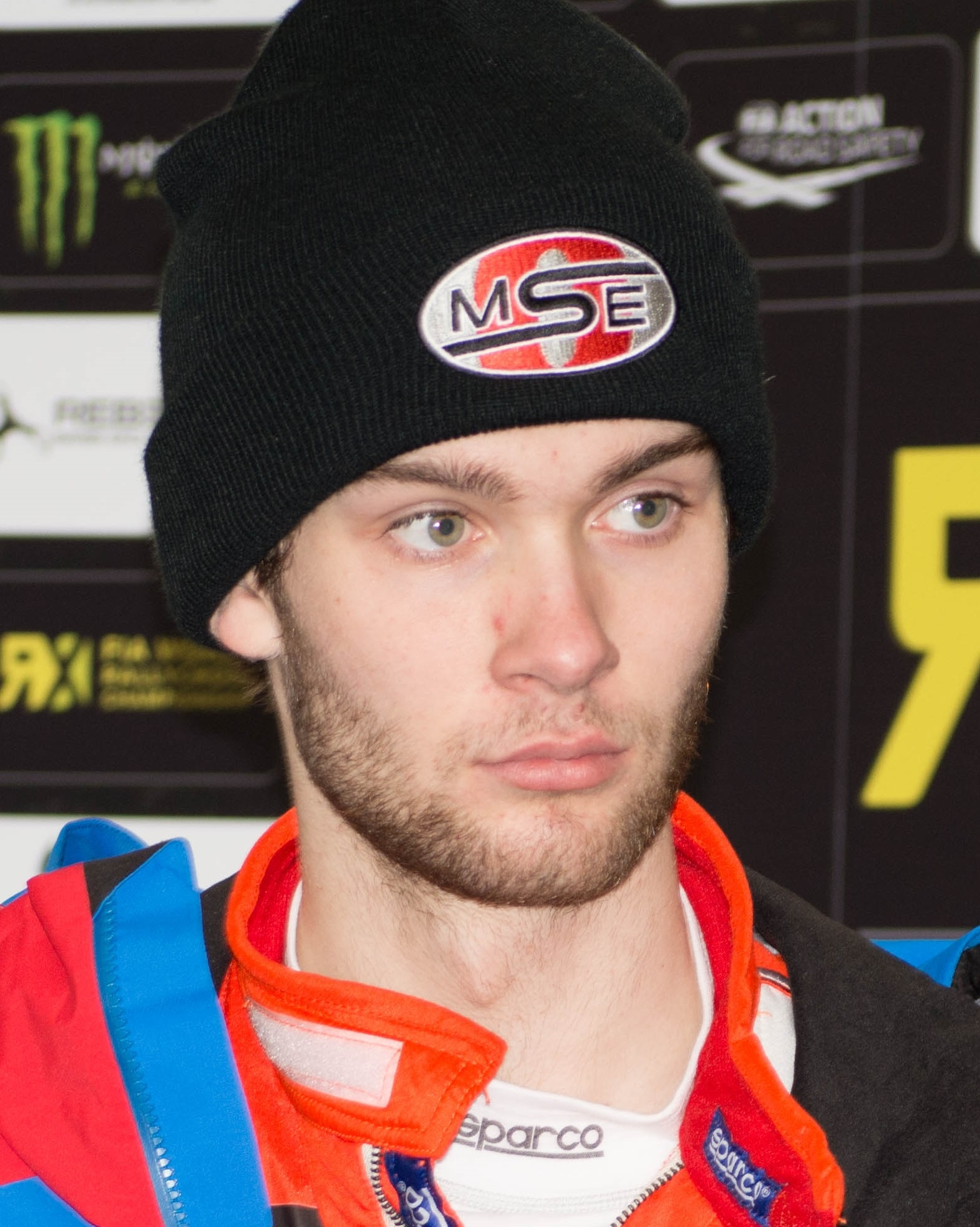
- Niclas Grönholm in 2016
- Nationality: (Finland) Finnish
- Born: Niclas Ulf Gustav Grönholm; 29 May 1996 (age 30) Kauniainen, Finland
- Relatives: Marcus Grönholm (father); Ulf Gronholm (Grandfather); Timo Rautiainen (Uncle)

FIA World Rallycross Championship career
- Debut season: 2015
- Current team: Construction Equipment Dealer Team
- Car number: 68
- Former teams: Olsbergs MSE, GRX-SET World RX Team
- Starts: 94
- Wins: 9
- Podiums: 25

Niclas Ulf Gustav Grönholm (born 29 May 1996) is a Finnish rally driver currently participating in the FIA World Rallycross Championship racing for GRX-SET World RX Team. He is the son of two time World Rally Champion Marcus Grönholm.

== Racing record ==
=== Complete FIA World Rallycross Championship results ===
==== Supercar/RX1/RX1e ====
Year	Entrant	Car	1	2	3	4	5	6	7	8	9	10	11	12	13	WRX	Points
2015	Niclas Grönholm	Ford Fiesta ST	POR	HOC	BEL	GBR	GER	SWE; 17	CAN	NOR	FRA	BAR	TUR	ITA	ARG	NC	0
2016	Olsbergs MSE	Ford Fiesta ST	POR; 17	HOC; 14	BEL; 15	GBR; 16	NOR; 16	SWE; 11	CAN; 12	FRA; 14	BAR; 15	LAT; 18	GER; 19	ARG		17th	28
2017	GRX	Ford Fiesta	BAR; 17	POR; 13	HOC; 16	BEL; 12	GBR; 15	NOR; 16	SWE; 8	CAN; 14^{a}	FRA; 14	LAT; 12^{b}	GER; 5^{c}	RSA; 15^{d}		20th	4
2018	GRX Taneco Team	Hyundai i20	BAR; 4	POR; 10	BEL; 11	GBR; 5	NOR; 7	SWE; 11	CAN; 8	FRA; 11	LAT; 4	USA; 8	GER; 4	RSA; 13		7th	146
2019	GRX Taneco Team	Hyundai i20	ABU; 2	BAR; 4	BEL	GBR	NOR; 1	SWE; 5	CAN; 7	FRA; 6	LAT; 2	RSA; 1				4th	186
2020	GRX Taneco	Hyundai i20	SWE; 4	SWE; 9	FIN; 4	FIN; 1	LAT; 5	LAT; 5	ESP; 4	ESP; 8						4th	147
2021	GRX-SET World RX Team	Hyundai i20	BAR; 8	SWE; 8	FRA; 3	LAT; 1	LAT; 2	BEL; 8	PRT; 1	GER; 4	GER; 1					3rd	197
2022	Construction Equipment Dealer Team	PWR RX1e	NOR; 5	LAT; 7	LAT; 5	POR; 7	POR; 1	BEL; 5	BEL; 2	ESP; 2	ESP; 5	GER; 2				3rd	130
2023	Construction Equipment Dealer Team	PWR RX1e	POR; 3	NOR; 2	SWE; 7	GBR; C	BLX; C	GER; C								3rd	94
2023	Construction Equipment Dealer Team	OMSE ZEROID X1							RSA; 5	RSA; 6	CHN; 2	CHN; 5				3rd	94
2024	Construction Equipment Dealer Team	PWR RX1e	SWE; 7	SWE; 2	HUN; 1	HUN; 9	BNL; 7	BNL; 4	PRT; 2	PRT; 6	TÜR; 2	TÜR; 5				5th	177
2025	Construction Equipment Dealer Team	PWR RX1e	PRT; 1	SWE; 2	HUN; 6	FIN; 6	TÜR1; 2	TÜR2; 3								2nd	121

^{a} Fifteen championship points deducted for use of a fourth engine seal.
^{b} Ten championship points deducted for use of a new turbo seal after initial scrutineering.
^{c} Fifteen championship points deducted for use of more than three engine seals in the season.
^{d} Ten championship points deducted for use of a seventh turbocharger in the season.

==== RX Lites Cup ====
Year	Entrant	Car	1	2	3	4	5	6	Lites	Points
2014	Set Promotion	Lites Ford Fiesta	POR	GBR	FIN; 3	SWE	ITA	TUR	15th	22

=== RallyX on Ice ===
(key)

Year	Car	1	2	3	4	RallyX	Points
2016	Lites Ford Fiesta	PIT; 9	SAL; 11	TRY; 11	ARE; 8	11th	10

=== Complete WRC results ===
Year	Entrant	Car	1	2	3	4	5	6	7	Pos.	Points
2020	Niclas Grönholm	Škoda Fabia R5 Evo	MON	SWE	MEX	EST	TUR	ITA	MNZ; 40	NC	0
