= PWR Racing =

Swedish auto racing team

(Sweden) PWR Racing
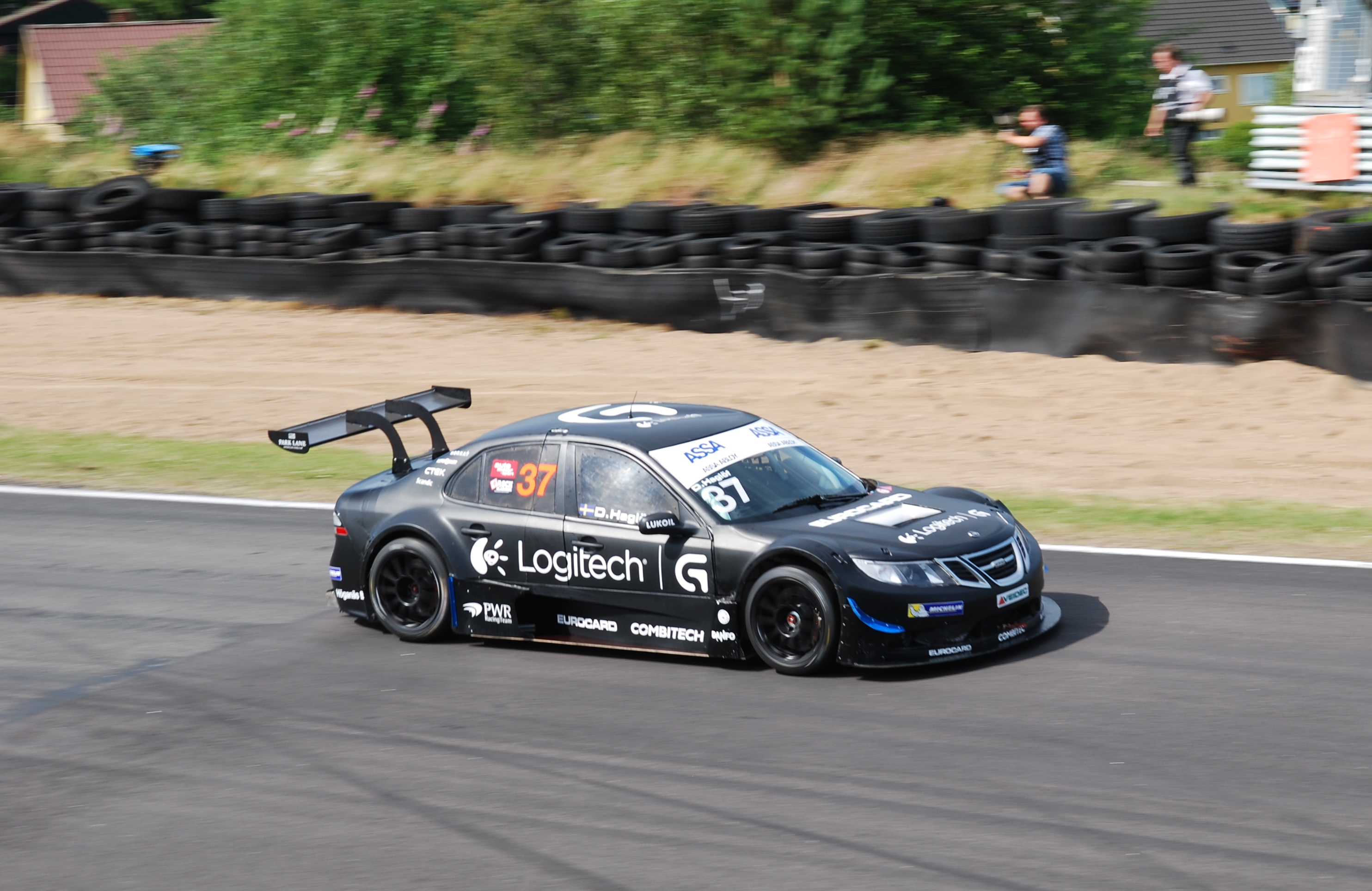
- Founded: 2012
- Team principal(s): Peter Wallenberg, Jr. Micke Jansson
- Current series: TCR Scandinavia
- Former series: World Touring Car Cup; Porsche Carrera Cup Scandinavia; FIA World Rallycross Championship
- Current drivers: 2. (Sweden) Robert Dahlgren; 37. (Sweden) Daniel Haglöf; 37. (Sweden) Peter Wallenberg; 89. (Sweden) Mikaela Åhlin-Kottulinsky
- Teams' Championships: TCR Scandinavia: 2018
- Drivers' Championships: TCR Scandinavia: 2017: Robert Dahlgren; 2019: Robert Dahlgren; 2021: Robert Dahlgren; 2022: Robert Dahlgren; TCR Scandinavia Junior Class: 2018: Philip Morin

PWR Racing is a Swedish auto racing team owned by racing drivers Peter Wallenberg, Jr. and Micke Janssonf. It currently competes in the TCR Scandinavia Touring Car Championship, the Porsche Carrera Cup Scandinavia, the World Touring Car Cup, and the FIA World Rallycross Championship.

== History ==
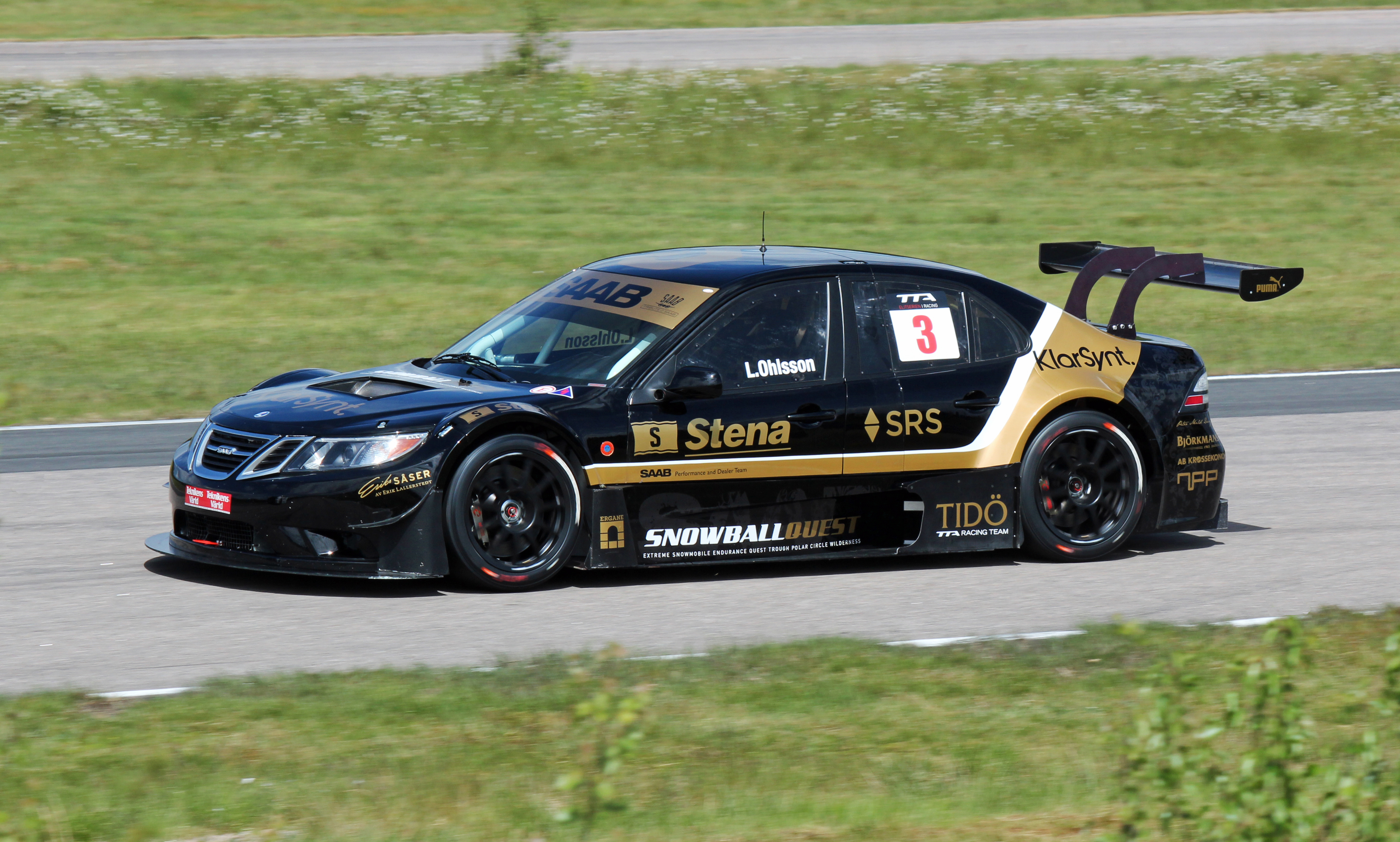
Linus Ohlsson racing for PWR Racing in 2012

The team was founded in 2012 by racing driver Peter "Poker" Wallenberg. The team initially entered TTA - Racing Elite League joining with Team Tidö with two cars for Linus Ohlsson and Daniel Haglöf. Following the reunification of TTA with STCC the team entered the series fielding single SAAB 9-3 TTA for Haglöf. For the 2014 season the team entered a single car for Finnish driver Emma Kimiläinen while Haglöf returned for the final races of the season. Both drivers were retained for 2015 while for the 2016 season they were joined by Johan Kristoffersson and Philip Morin at selected rounds. In that year the team became SEAT Dealer Team after switching to SEAT Léon STCC silhouette cars. After the series switched to TCR regulations the team again returned using 3 SEAT León TCR's for former Polestar Cyan Racing driver Robert Dahlgren, Daniel Haglöf and team owner Peter Wallenberg (Dahlgren and Haglöf entered under the SEAT Dealer Team banner, while Wallenberg was entered under the PWR Racing Customer Team) and also entered single Audi RS3 LMS TCR for Mikaela Åhlin-Kottulinsky (this entry was entered under the PWR Racing Junior Team label).

== World Touring Car Cup ==
The team is set to enter the 2019 World Touring Car Cup with the support from Comtoyou Racing fielding two CUPRA León TCR for Haglöf and the 2018 TCR Europe Touring Car Series champion Mikel Azcona.
