= Ricer =

Ricer may refer to:

- Potato ricer, an implement used for food preparation
- Rice burner, a pejorative term for some Japanese or East Asian-made vehicles
