= Hoon =

Person driving in an anti-social way

A hoon (/huːn/) is an Australian and New Zealand term describing a person who deliberately drives a vehicle in a reckless or dangerous manner, generally in order to provoke a reaction from onlookers.

Hoon activities (or hooning) can include speeding, burnouts, doughnuts, or screeching tyres. Those commonly identified as being involved in hooning are young and predominantly male drivers in the age range of 17 to 25 years.

Hooning is also sometimes used in the context of other activities involving high speeds such as skiing, snowboarding, skateboarding, etc, in reference to young people going irresponsibly fast and endangering others.

Hoon control laws are beginning to be extended to dangerous hoon behaviour using boats and other vessels, particularly jet skis. The Australian state of Victoria passed legislation in late 2009 to control hoon activities using recreational vessels.

== Etymology ==
At the turn of the 20th century in Australia, the term hoon (and its rhyming slang version "silver spoon") had a different meaning: one who lived off immoral earnings (i.e., the proceeds of prostitution, as a pimp or procurer of prostitutes).

Linguist Sid Baker in his book The Australian Language suggested that hoon (meaning "a fool") was a contraction of Houyhnhnm, a fictional race of intelligent horses which appears in Gulliver's Travels by Jonathan Swift.

It may also be a portmanteau word combining "hooligan" and "goon."

== Anti-hoon legislation in Australia ==
The term hoon has obtained a semi-official use in Australia, with police and governments referring to legislation targeting anti-social driving activity as "anti-hoon laws". The term has even begun to appear in the titles of legislation, e.g. Victoria's Transport Legislation Amendment (Hoon Boating and Other Amendments) Act 2009.

In Western Australia, the Road Traffic Amendment (Impounding and Confiscation of Vehicles) Bill 2004, which was passed by the Parliament of Western Australia in June 2004, empowered the Western Australia Police to confiscate and impound vehicles found to be engaging in excessive speed or noise. The law was used to impound a Lamborghini after a mechanic was caught speeding in it; he had been driving without the owner's knowledge. The police claim that the law does not permit them to release the car under the only legal course of action available to the owner, that of "hardship". The police retorted that, having the means to own it, "he can afford to hire a vehicle." The owner complained that the law amounted to "mandatory sentencing without trial". The Western Australian Police Minister, Rob Johnston, "admits the laws are unfair but says he stands by them". Former Western Australia District Court Chief Judge Antoinette Kennedy described the minister's reaction as "the politics of envy". After all hoon-related offences, the defendant's licence is cancelled and experience accumulated on it is returned to zero.

In the state of Victoria, hoon-related offences include burnouts, doughnuts, drag racing, repeated driving while disqualified and high-level speeding were added to Section 84C of the Road Safety Act 1986 in July 2006. Victoria Police have impounded an average of ten cars a day under the laws, with over 5,000 vehicles confiscated and impounded two years after their introduction. By contrast, the hoon boating laws of Victoria currently centre on offences involving dangerous behaviour and do not yet reference offences relating to public order or amenity.

In Queensland, the Police Powers and Responsibilities Act 2000 allows members of the Queensland Police to impound the vehicles involved in prescribed offences. The laws relating to confiscation of vehicles for offences such as street racing, time trials and burnouts were strengthened in 2002. Further laws introduced in July 2008 provided for the confiscation of vehicles for repeat offenders involved with drunk driving, driving while suspended or driving with illegal modifications.

The maximum penalty for hooning in Queensland is $4,712 or six months imprisonment. Repeat offenders can lose their vehicle for 48 hours for the first repeat offence, up to three months for a second repeat offence, or permanently for a third repeat offence. On 11 August 2008, a number of confiscated vehicles were auctioned by the government; the remainder were crushed and sold as scrap metal.

In New South Wales, the word hoon is actually contained in the name of the legislation – the Road Transport Legislation Amendment (Car Hoons) Act 2008 enacted in July 2008 – which introduced new measures against street racing and increased fines. Previous legislation provided only for the vehicles of repeat offenders to be forfeited to the Crown, but the Car Hoons Act allowed for them to be used in crash testing by Transport for NSW, for educational and deterrence purposes, and roadworthiness testing in the context of modifications.

In South Australia, the relevant legislation is the Criminal Law (Clamping, Impounding And Forfeiture of Vehicles) Act 2007. The legislation, amended in December 2009, directs that, upon conviction for a 'prescribed offence' the motor vehicle be forfeited to the Crown; the Police Commissioner then has discretion to sell or otherwise dispose of it, i.e. crush it. At the end of 2010, 62 cars had been impounded by the courts. None were worth more than $1600 and many were not capable of reaching 150 km/h.

In Tasmania, police officers have the power to confiscate and clamp motor vehicles where drivers commit certain types of "hooning" offences. These powers are contained in the Police Offences Act 1935 and the Traffic Act 1925. The "hooning" offences to which they apply include unlawful entry on land with a motor vehicle, failing to comply with a direction to leave a public place, "hooning" behaviour such as causing a loss of traction in your wheels or creating unnecessary noise, recklessly or negligently driving, holding a race without a permit, evading police, driving over 45 km/h over the speed limit and driving whilst disqualified.

It is an offence to commit certain types of "hooning" behaviour, including operating a motor vehicle in a way that deliberately creates unnecessary noise or smoke, unnecessarily accelerating or causing a loss of traction (for example, by doing burnouts or drag racing) or racing against another vehicle. This offence is contained in the Police Offences Act 1935. The maximum penalty for this offence is 20 penalty units (i.e. $2,800), 3 months’ imprisonment or both. Also, a court may order that the offender be disqualified from driving for a maximum period of 2 years.

== Hoon crime groups and gatherings ==
Since 2019 there has been a rise in hoon gatherings with hoon crime rings in relation to criminal activity uploading their images and videos on social media. The names of these hoon criminal groups include the "Black Bandit" in Victoria and the "Mexican Hoon Cartel" in Queensland.

== Notable usages ==
- Formula One World Champion Lewis Hamilton was described as a "hoon" by a magistrate as he fined him A$500 after being caught by Victoria Police performing fishtails and burnouts in his Mercedes-AMG C63 two days before the 2010 Australian Grand Prix.
- In a similar case to Hamilton's, former NASCAR driver and Stadium Super Trucks founder Robby Gordon was caught performing doughnuts in a Stadium Super Truck outside a Darwin, Northern Territory nightclub following a race at Hidden Valley Raceway. He was fined A$4,150 after pleading guilty on four traffic charges and his Confederation of Australian Motor Sport competition visa for future Australian events was suspended. In addition to indefinitely prohibiting him from racing in Australia, the visa ban placed the future of the racing series in Australia in doubt.
- Texas Motor Speedway calls its Global RallyCross Championship race held during Firestone Firehawk 550 weekend as the "Hoon Kaboom", as many GRC cars are similar to types of cars "hoons" will typically drive.
- Rally driver Ken Block incorporated the term in his marketing campaigns, and amalgamated the word into his team name – Hoonigan Racing Division.
- The term is used in the original Mad Max to refer to the bikers stalking Max's family.
- In Terry Pratchett's Discworld series, Bruce the Hoon was a barbarian hero whose exploits were recounted over and over again by Truckle the Uncivil.

== See also ==
- Car tuning
- Boy racer
- Evo Street Racers
- Lowrider
- Rice burner
- Scraper (car)
- Sideshow (automobile exhibition)
- Skate punk
- Street racing
- Supercar scare
