= 2016 World RX of France =

Rallycross event

- Round 8 of 12 in the 2016 FIA World Rallycross Championship
- Date: 3–4 September 2016
- Location: Lohéac, Bretagne
- Venue: Circuit de Lohéac

Results
Heat winners
- Heat 1: (Sweden) Mattias Ekström; EKS RX
- Heat 2: (Sweden) Mattias Ekström; EKS RX
- Heat 3: Johan Kristoffersson; Volkswagen RX Sweden
- Heat 4: Johan Kristoffersson; Volkswagen RX Sweden
Semi-final winners
- Semi-final 1: (Norway) Andreas Bakkerud; Hoonigan Racing Division
- Semi-final 2: Johan Kristoffersson; Volkswagen RX Sweden
Final
- First: Johan Kristoffersson; Volkswagen RX Sweden
- Second: (Norway) Andreas Bakkerud; Hoonigan Racing Division
- Third: (France) Sébastien Loeb; Team Peugeot-Hansen

World RX layout of Circuit de Lohéac

The 2016 World RX of France was the eighth round of the third season of the FIA World Rallycross Championship. The event was held at the Circuit de Lohéac in the Lohéac commune of Bretagne.

== Supercar ==
=== Heats ===
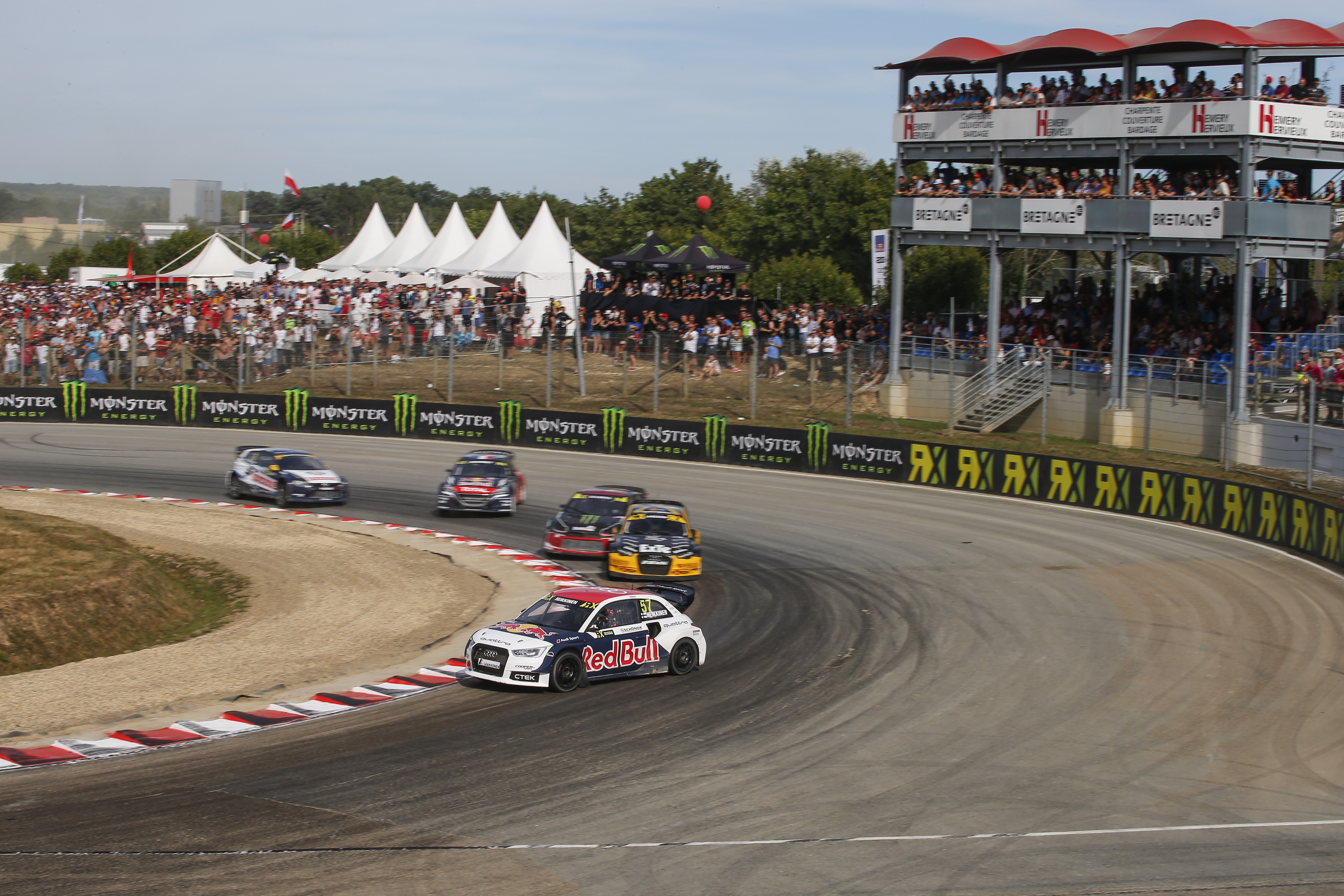
Qualifying 2 Race 5

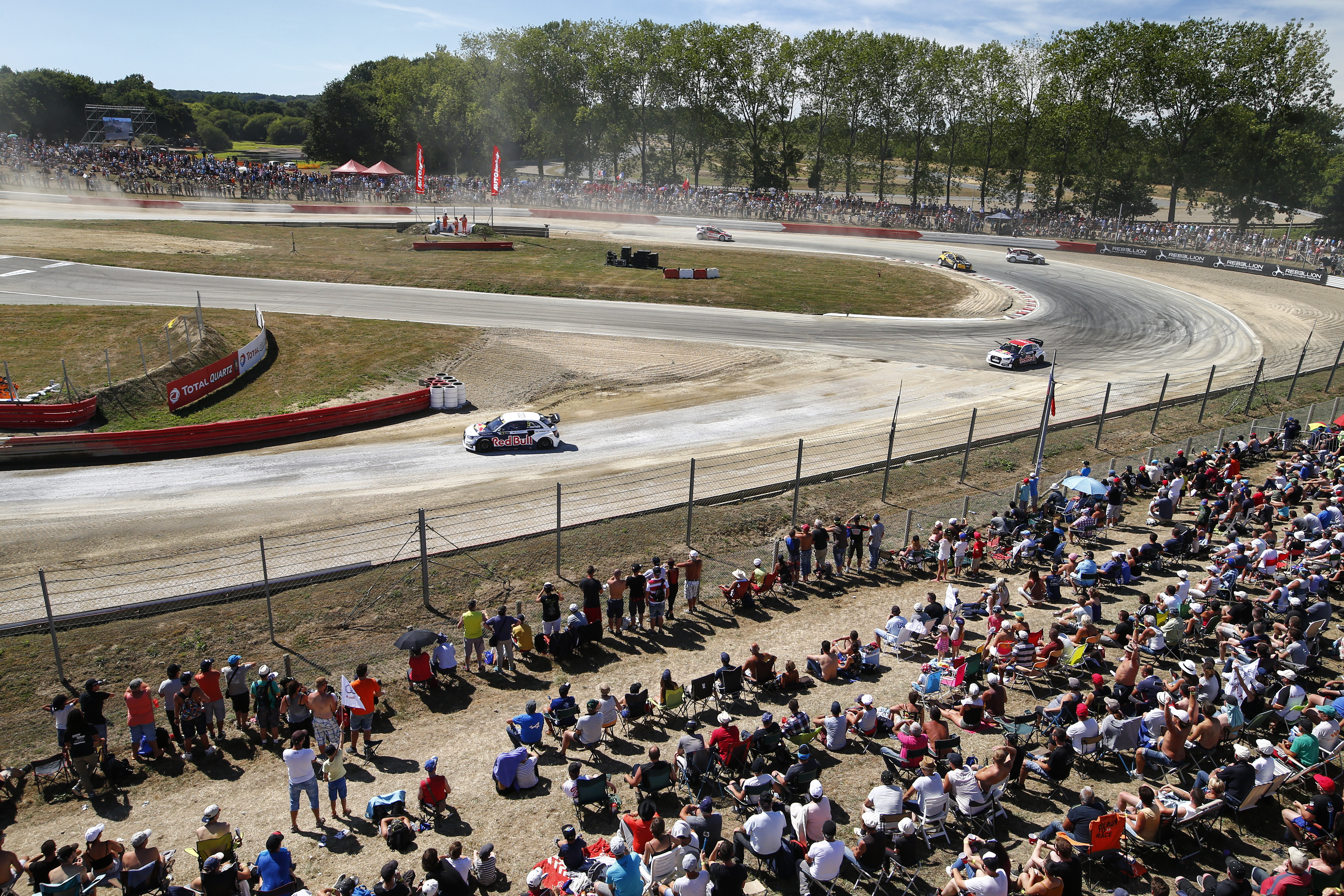
The circuit split between the regular lap and the Joker lap

Pos.	No.	Driver	Team	Car	Q1	Q2	Q3	Q4	Pts
1	5	(Sweden) Mattias Ekström	EKS RX	Audi S1	1st	1st	2nd	3rd	16
2	3	(Sweden) Johan Kristoffersson	Volkswagen RX Sweden	Volkswagen Polo	9th	13th	1st	1st	15
3	13	(Norway) Andreas Bakkerud	Hoonigan Racing Division	Ford Focus RS	3rd	2nd	4th	9th	14
4	43	(United States) Ken Block	Hoonigan Racing Division	Ford Focus RS	5th	8th	5th	6th	13
5	1	(Norway) Petter Solberg	Petter Solberg World RX Team	Citroën DS3	6th	10th	11th	2nd	12
6	9	(France) Sébastien Loeb	Team Peugeot-Hansen	Peugeot 208	2nd	6th	14th	7th	11
7	21	(Sweden) Timmy Hansen	Team Peugeot-Hansen	Peugeot 208	4th	4th	10th	13th	10
8	17	(France) Davy Jeanney	Peugeot Hansen Academy	Peugeot 208	7th	12th	12th	4th	9
9	4	(Sweden) Robin Larsson	Larsson Jernberg Motorsport	Audi A1	10th	9th	8th	10th	8
10	71	(Sweden) Kevin Hansen	Peugeot Hansen Academy	Peugeot 208	26th	3rd	7th	8th	7
11	15	(Latvia) Reinis Nitišs	All-Inkl.com Münnich Motorsport	SEAT Ibiza	12th	15th	15th	5th	6
12	26	(United Kingdom) Andy Scott	Albatec Racing	Peugeot 208	17th	20th	6th	12th	5
13	24	(Norway) Tommy Rustad	Albatec Racing	Peugeot 208	19th	11th	18th	11th	4
14	68	(Finland) Niclas Grönholm	Olsbergs MSE	Ford Fiesta ST	16th	14th	20th	14th	3
15	57	(Finland) Toomas Heikkinen	EKS RX	Audi S1	8th	7th	27th	19th	2
16	55	(Germany) René Münnich	All-Inkl.com Münnich Motorsport	SEAT Ibiza	18th	18th	19th	16th	1
17	87	(France) Jean-Baptiste Dubourg	DA Racing	Citroën DS3	13th	26th	3rd	26th	
18	92	(Sweden) Anton Marklund	Volkswagen RX Sweden	Volkswagen Polo	14th	16th	16th	25th	
19	98	(France) Pascal Le Nouvel	Pascal Le Nouvel	Ford Fiesta	24th	28th	9th	15th	
20	84	(France) "Knapick"	Hervé "Knapick" Lemonnier	Citroën DS3	22nd	19th	21st	20th	
21	121	(France) Philippe Maloigne	Albatec Racing	Peugeot 208	25th	24th	17th	17th	
22	29	(France) Yann Le Jossec	Olsbergs MSE	Ford Fiesta ST	11th	17th	25th	27th	
23	11	(Sweden) Fredrik Salsten	HTD Salsten Racing	Peugeot 208	15th	21st	28th	18th	
24	83	(France) Patrick Guillerme	Patrick Guillerme	Peugeot 208	20th	22nd	24th	21st	
25	49	(Belgium) "M.D.K."	"M.D.K."	Ford Fiesta	23rd	25th	23rd	22nd	
26	6	(Latvia) Jānis Baumanis	World RX Team Austria	Ford Fiesta	30th	5th	13th	28th	
27	2	(Republic of Ireland) Oliver O'Donovan	Oliver O'Donovan	Ford Fiesta	21st	27th	22nd	23rd	
28	102	(Hungary) Tamás Kárai	Racing-Com	Audi A1	27th	23rd	26th	24th	
29	89	(France) Fabien Chanoine	Fabien Chanoine	Renault Clio	28th	29th	29th	29th	
30	7	(Russia) Timur Timerzyanov	World RX Team Austria	Ford Fiesta	29th	30th	30th	30th	
31	65	(France) Guerlain Chicherit	JRM Racing	BMW MINI Countryman	31st	31st	31st	31st	

=== Semi-finals ===
Semi-final 1

Pos.	No.	Driver	Team	Time	Pts
1	13	(Norway) Andreas Bakkerud	Hoonigan Racing Division	3:56.013	6
2	1	(Norway) Petter Solberg	Petter Solberg World RX Team	+3.807	5
3	15	(Latvia) Reinis Nitišs	All-Inkl.com Münnich Motorsport	+4.262	4
4	5	(Sweden) Mattias Ekström	EKS RX	+4.629	3
5	21	(Sweden) Timmy Hansen	Team Peugeot-Hansen	+27.329	2
6	4	(Sweden) Robin Larsson	Larsson Jernberg Motorsport	DNF	1

Semi-final 2

Pos.	No.	Driver	Team	Time	Pts
1	3	(Sweden) Johan Kristoffersson	Volkswagen RX Sweden	3:55.777	6
2	9	(France) Sébastien Loeb	Team Peugeot-Hansen	+3.325	5
3	43	(United States) Ken Block	Hoonigan Racing Division	+4.246	4
4	17	(France) Davy Jeanney	Peugeot Hansen Academy	+4.735	3
5	71	(Sweden) Kevin Hansen	Peugeot Hansen Academy	+5.068	2
6	26	(United Kingdom) Andy Scott	Albatec Racing	+9.103	1

=== Final ===
Pos.	No.	Driver	Team	Time	Pts
1	3	(Sweden) Johan Kristoffersson	Volkswagen RX Sweden	3:54.670	8
2	13	(Norway) Andreas Bakkerud	Hoonigan Racing Division	+3.417	5
3	9	(France) Sébastien Loeb	Team Peugeot-Hansen	+5.319	4
4	1	(Norway) Petter Solberg	Petter Solberg World RX Team	+5.812	3
5	15	(Latvia) Reinis Nitišs	All-Inkl.com Münnich Motorsport	+6.372	2
6	43	(United States) Ken Block	Hoonigan Racing Division	DNF	1

== Standings after the event ==
Pos.	Driver	Pts	Gap
1	(Norway) Petter Solberg	181	
2	(Sweden) Mattias Ekström	176	+5
3	(Sweden) Johan Kristoffersson	158	+23
4	(Norway) Andreas Bakkerud	157	+24
5	(France) Sébastien Loeb	141	+40

Previous race: 2016 World RX of Canada	FIA World Rallycross Championship; 2016 season	Next race: 2016 World RX of Barcelona
Previous race: 2015 World RX of France	World RX of France	Next race: 2017 World RX of France
