= Boy racer =

Stereotype-based term used for vindictive drivers

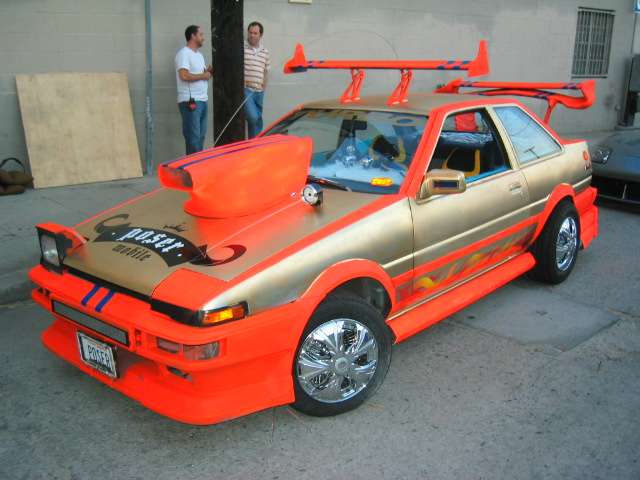
T-Mobile's 1985 Toyota Corolla Sport GT-S coupé "Poser Mobile" advertisements created a stereotypical caricature "rice burner" or "boy racer" car typical of the import scene, whose appearance and behavior is comically aspirational and "phony".

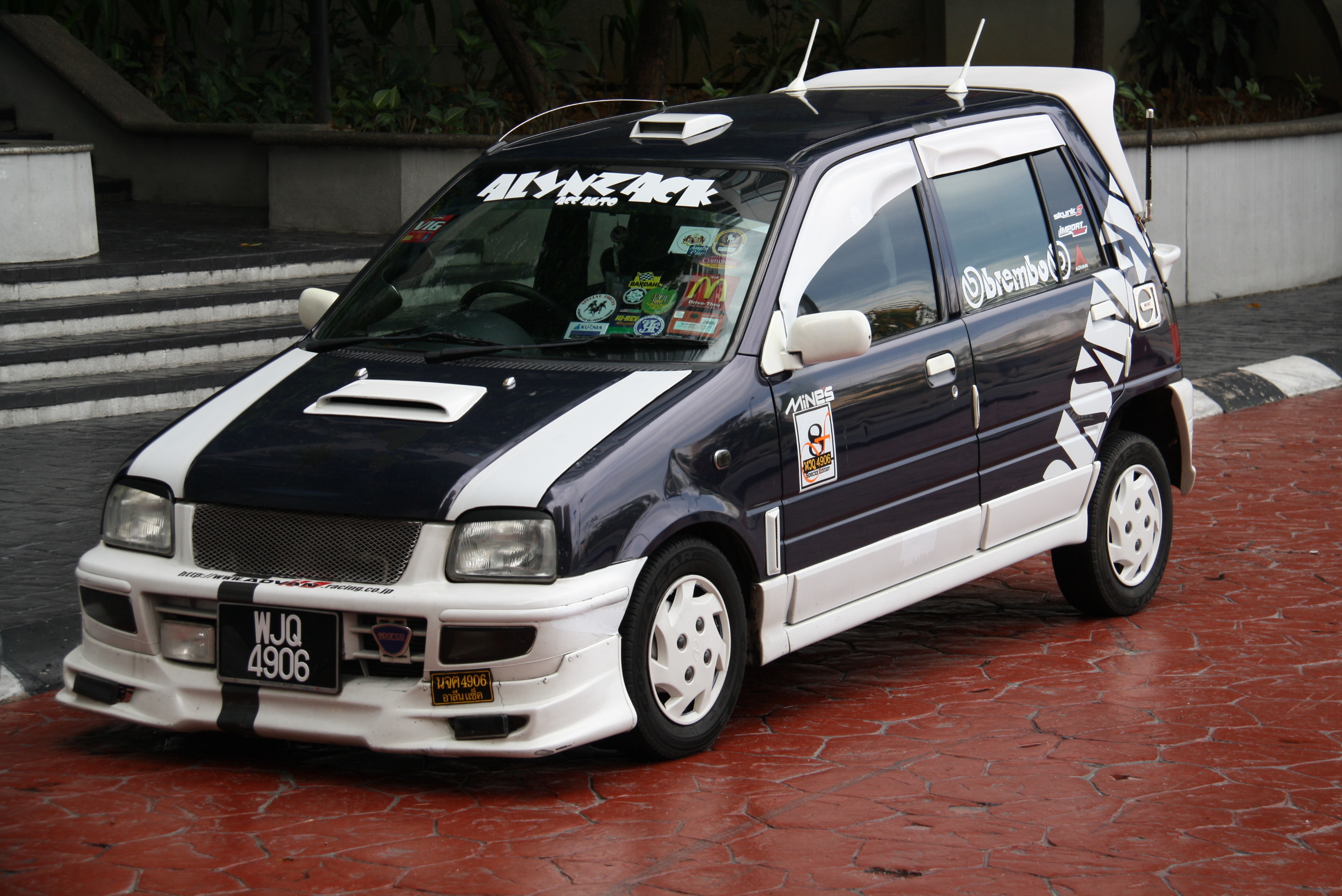
Boy racer in Malaysia

Boy racer is a term given to a young person who drives in a fast and aggressive manner; it has become a broader term (often pejorative) for participants in modern custom car culture who tune and modify cars with street racing-style aftermarket cosmetic and performance parts such as body kits, audio systems and exhausts. The culture encompasses a broad range of car types including sport compacts and economy cars typical of the import scene, this is in contrast with the hot rod culture of previous generations. Some car enthusiasts and modifiers feel the term labels them as deviant and anti-social and are keen to distance themselves from the term. Boy racer is a term mostly but not exclusively associated with the UK, in Australia and New Zealand hoon is sometimes preferred. In the US, "Rice boy" or "Ricer" is a derogatory term for the driver or builder of an imported hot rod, or someone who modifies their car in a cheap way to imitate the look of a higher performance vehicle.

Responses to the boy racer phenomenon range from laws prohibiting certain cosmetic modifications to vehicles such as decorative lighting or tinted windows to restrictions on cruising.

== Culture ==
Publications for boy racers included Max Power, Fast Car, New Zealand Performance Car Magazine, MTV's Pimp My Ride and The Fast and the Furious as well as DVD publications and television shows.

== Vehicle modification ==
Modifications typically associated with the stereotype include:

- Aftermarket stereos
- Extravagant paint jobs
- Loud exhaust systems
- Aftermarket alloy wheels
- Hellaflush (tyres given excess camber, and scratching the tyre fenders)
- Oversized spoilers and bonnet scoops
- Suspension modifications to lower a car's ride height and stiffen ride (often referred to as stance)
- Body kits, neon/L.E.D lights and other appearance modifications
- Tinted windows

== Boy racers by country ==
=== New Zealand ===
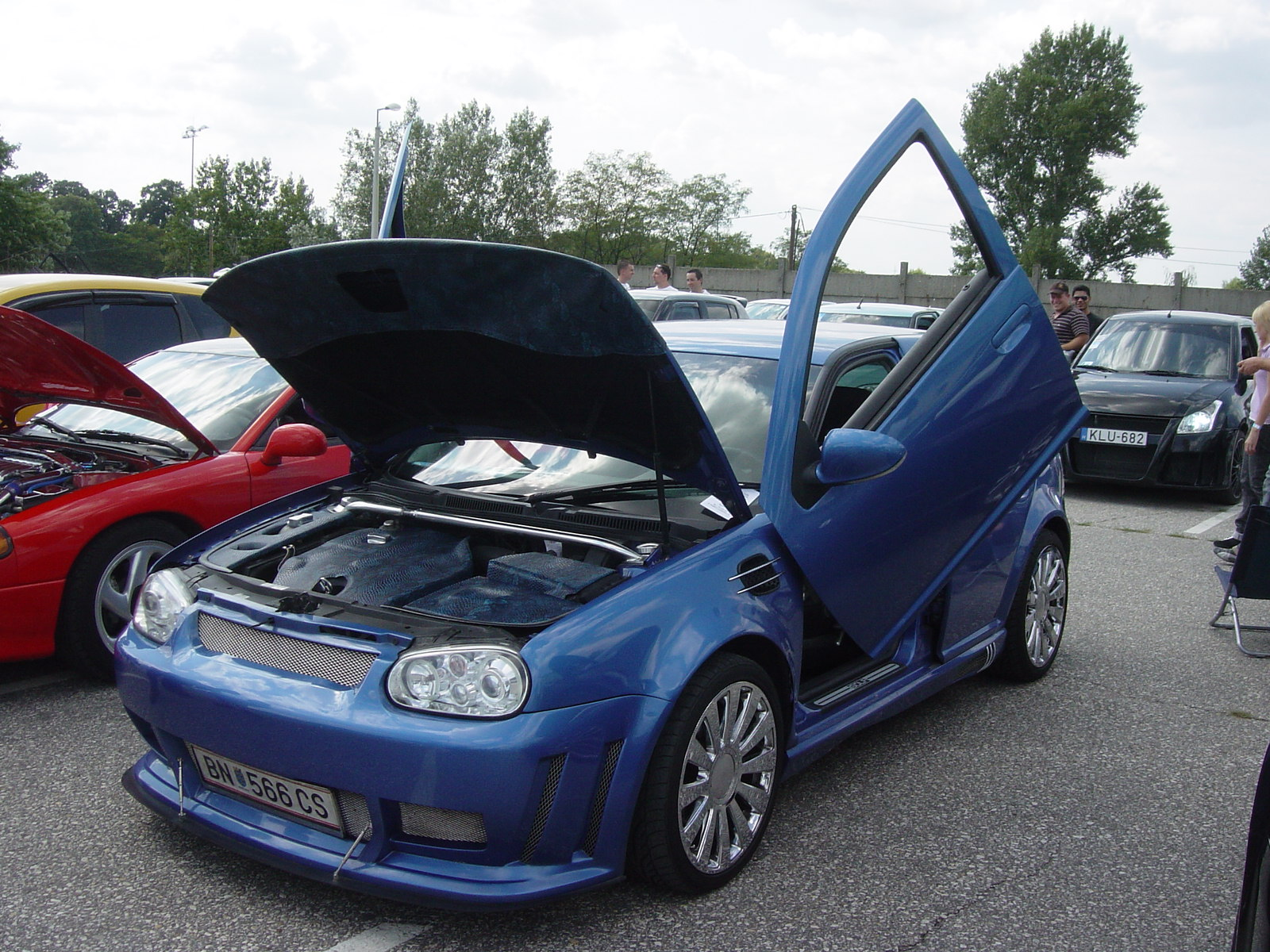
A modified Volkswagen Golf Mk4

The term boy racer is used in New Zealand to describe a youth that drives any form of vehicle that is of high performance or has been modified in any way (including factory fitted parts). The Land Transport (Unauthorised Street and Drag Racing) Amendment Act 2003 is commonly known as the "Boy Racer Act".

In 2009, a government led by the National Party augmented the Act with the Land Transport (Enforcement Powers) Amendment Act and the Sentencing (Vehicle Confiscation) Amendment Act, which allow police to confiscate and "crush" (correctly, dismantle for saleable parts and destroy the remainder) vehicles on the third offence within four years, issue infringements for "cruising" and prosecute street racing and "antisocial" behaviour, by creating temporary by-laws. The first car crushing sentence was passed down in December 2011.

The first car to be crushed in accordance with this act was a white Nissan Laurel crushed at a Lower Hutt scrap yard on 21 June 2012 by New Zealand Police Minister of the time Anne Tolley. The crushed Nissan is now on display at Museum of Transport & Technology in Auckland.

While the slang word "bogan" generally has a broader meaning, it is often used in New Zealand in reference to owners of larger Australian cars, like Ford Falcons or Holden Commodores.

Most cheap vehicles in New Zealand are used Japanese imports and the culture follows modification of these cars.

== See also ==
- Hoon (Australian/New Zealand term. Often used for reckless drivers regardless of car.)
- Itasha
- Rice burner
- Car tuning
- Street racing
- Manta joke
