= Hoonigan Racing Division =

Rallying team, participant in major rally and rallycross championships

(United States) Hoonigan Racing Division
- Founded: 2010
- Folded: 2024
- Team principal(s): Block family
- Former series: American Rally Association; World Rally Championship; Global RallyCross Championship; European Rallycross Championship; World Rallycross Championship

The Hoonigan Racing Division, founded by Ken Block, was a motor racing team that competed in the American Rally Association. The team previously competed in the World Rally Championship, Global RallyCross Championship, FIA World Rallycross Championship and Rally America.

== History ==
The team was formed by Ken Block as Monster World Rally Team at the beginning of 2010, as a platform for him to compete at world championship level. The team, sponsored by Monster Energy, ran a 2011-spec Ford Fiesta RS WRC for Block and co-driver Alex Gelsomino at selected events in the World Rally Championship. In 2013, the team was renamed to Hoonigan Racing Division, with Hoonigan being a play on the Australian English slang hoon for a reckless driver and the word hooligan. At the Global Rallycross, Block finished fifth in 2012, third in 2013, second in 2014 and seventh in 2015. Block also claimed a third-place finish and a fourth at the 2014 World Rallycross Championship.

In 2016, Block competed full-time in the FIA World Rallycross Championship alongside Andreas Bakkerud. He drove a Ford Focus RS, built and run by M-Sport, a British motorsport team, who also build and prepare the cars for every rally team and several rallycross teams competing with the Fiesta model.

On September 4, 2017, Ford Performance and Hoonigan Racing Division announced their withdrawal from the World Rallycross Championship after the 2017 season.

In September 2024, Hoonigan filed for Chapter 11 bankruptcy protection. The company will use bankruptcy in efforts to improve financing and support long-term growth. Hoonigan exited bankruptcy on December 2, 2024.

== Racing record ==
=== Complete FIA World Rally Championship results ===
Year	Entrant	Car	No.	Driver	1	2	3	4	5	6	7	8	9	10	11	12	13	WDC	Points	WCC	Points
2010	Monster Energy World Rally Team	Ford Focus RS WRC 08	43	(United States) Ken Block	SWE	MEX; 18	JOR	TUR; 24	NZL	POR; Ret	BUL	FIN	GER; Ret	JPN	FRA; 12	ESP; 9	GBR; 21	19th	2	-	-
2011	Monster Energy World Rally Team	Ford Fiesta RS WRC	43	(United States) Ken Block	SWE; 14	MEX; 12	POR; DNS	JOR	ITA	ARG; 18	GRE	FIN	GER; 17	AUS; 19	FRA; 8	ESP; Ret	GBR; 9	22nd	6	8th	27
2012	Monster Energy World Rally Team	Ford Fiesta RS WRC	21	(Australia) Chris Atkinson	MON	SWE	MEX; Ret	POR	ARG	GRE	NZL	FIN	GER	GBR	FRA	ITA	ESP	20th	4	-	-
2012	Monster Energy World Rally Team	Ford Fiesta RS WRC	43	(United States) Ken Block	MON	SWE	MEX; 9	POR	ARG	GRE	NZL; 9	FIN; Ret	GER	GBR	FRA	ITA	ESP	28th	4	-	-
2013	Hoonigan Racing Division	Ford Fiesta RS WRC	43	(United States) Ken Block	MON	SWE	MEX; 7	POR	ARG	GRE	ITA	FIN	GER	AUS	FRA	ESP	GBR	17th	6	-	-
2018	Hoonigan Racing Division	Ford Fiesta WRC	43	(United States) Ken Block	MON	SWE	MEX	FRA	ARG	POR	ITA	FIN	GER	TUR	GBR	ESP; Ret	AUS	-	0	-	-

=== Complete FIA World Rallycross Championship results ===
==== Supercar ====
Year	Entrant	Car	No.	Driver	1	2	3	4	5	6	7	8	9	10	11	12	WRX	Points	Teams	Points
2014	Hoonigan Racing Division	Ford Fiesta ST	43	(United States) Ken Block	POR	GBR	NOR; 3	FIN	SWE	BEL	CAN	FRA; 4	GER	ITA	TUR; DNP	ARG	16th	32	N/A	N/A
2016	Hoonigan Racing Division	Ford Focus RS	13	(Norway) Andreas Bakkerud	POR; 4	HOC; 12	BEL; 14	GBR; 6	NOR; 1	SWE; 1	CAN; 2	FRA; 2	BAR; 7	LAT; 4	GER; 3	ARG; 1	3rd	239	4th	302
2016	Hoonigan Racing Division	Ford Focus RS	43	(United States) Ken Block	POR; 18	HOC; 3	BEL; 19	GBR; 14	NOR; 14	SWE; 13	CAN; 10	FRA; 6	BAR; 16	LAT; 16	GER; 12	ARG; 15	14th	63	4th	302
2017	Hoonigan Racing Division	Ford Focus RS	13	(Norway) Andreas Bakkerud	BAR; 3	POR; 10	HOC; 14	BEL; 6	GBR; 3	NOR; 2	SWE; 2	CAN; 13	FRA; 4	LAT; 4	GER; 8	RSA; 7	6th	194	4th	306
2017	Hoonigan Racing Division	Ford Focus RS	43	(United States) Ken Block	BAR; 9	POR; 11	HOC; 11	BEL; 8	GBR; 7	NOR; 8	SWE; 9	CAN; 9	FRA; 7†	LAT; 14	GER; 14	RSA; 8	9th	112	4th	306

^{†} Five championship points deducted for receiving three reprimands in a season.

=== Complete FIA European Rallycross Championship results ===
==== Supercar ====
Year	Entrant	Car	No	Driver	1	2	3	4	5	ERX	Points
2014	Hoonigan Racing Division	Ford Fiesta ST	43	(United States) Ken Block	GBR	NOR; 1	BEL	GER	ITA	15th	16

=== Complete Global Rallycross Championship results ===
(key)

==== Supercar ====
Year	Entrant	Car	No	Driver	1	2	3	4	5	6	7	8	9	10	11	12	GRC	Points
2011	Monster World Rally Team	Ford Fiesta	43	(United States) Ken Block	IRW1	IRW2	SEA1	SEA2	PIK1	PIK2	LA1; 11	LA2; 13					23rd	10
2012	Monster World Rally Team Ford Racing	Ford Fiesta	43	(United States) Ken Block	CHA; 15	TEX; 8	LA; 2	LOU; 5	LV; 7	LVC; 10							5th	58
2013	Hoonigan Racing Division	Ford Fiesta ST	43	(United States) Ken Block	BRA; 9	MUN1; 2	MUN2; DSQ	LOU; 5	BRI; 2	IRW; 6	ATL; 8	CHA; 7	LV; 1				3rd	115
2014	Hoonigan Racing Division	Ford Fiesta ST	43	(United States) Ken Block	BAR; 10	AUS; 11	DC; 7	NY; 3	CHA; 1	DAY; 2	LA1; 3	LA2; 2	SEA; 9	LV; 1			2nd	376
2015	Hoonigan Racing Division	Ford Fiesta ST	43	(United States) Ken Block	FTA; 1	DAY1; 8	DAY2; 2	MCAS; 1	DET1; 1	DET2; 7	DC; 3	LA1; 11	LA2; 9	BAR1; 11	BAR1; 10	LV; 10	7th	345

== Gallery ==
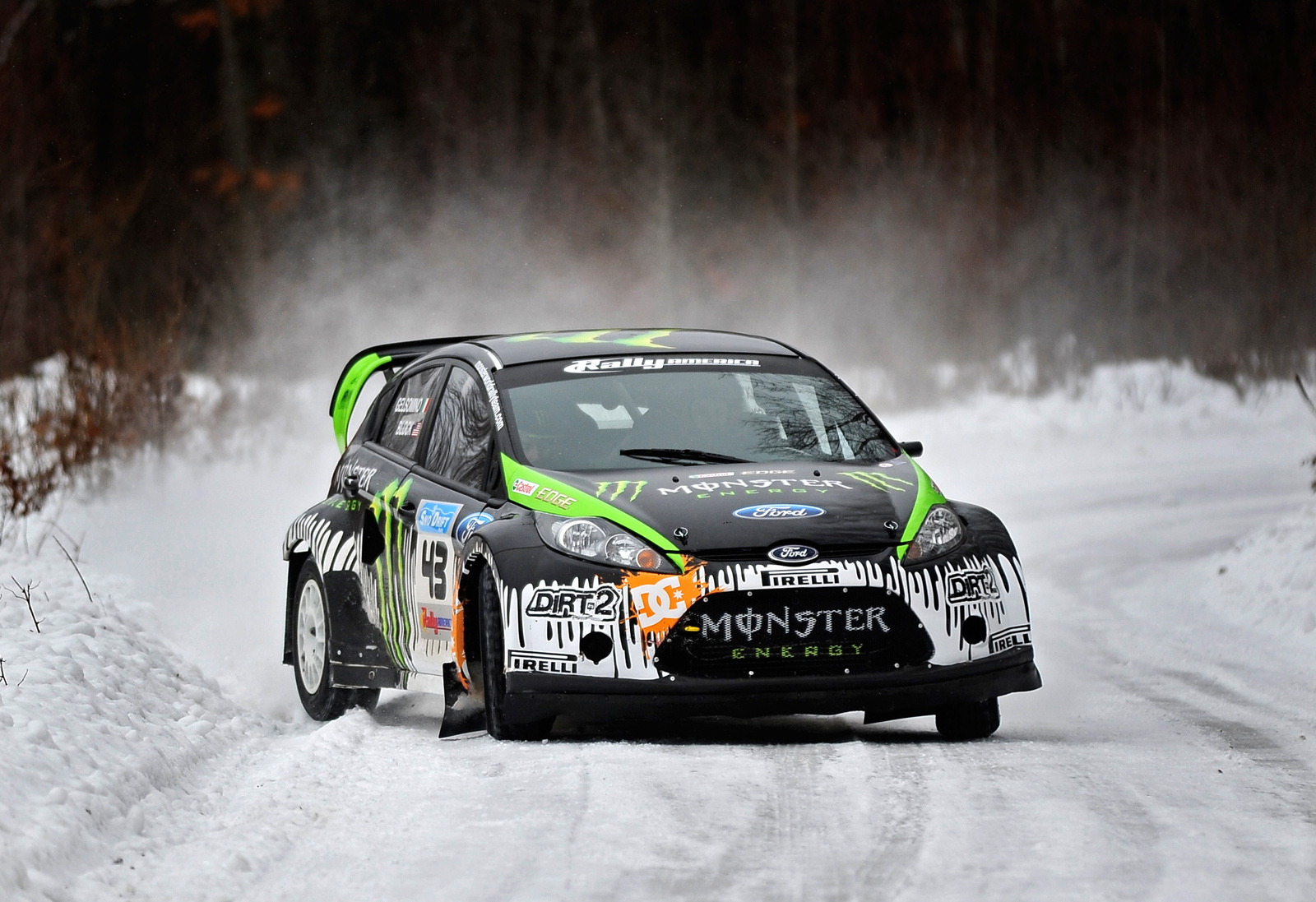
Sno* Drift Rally test drive

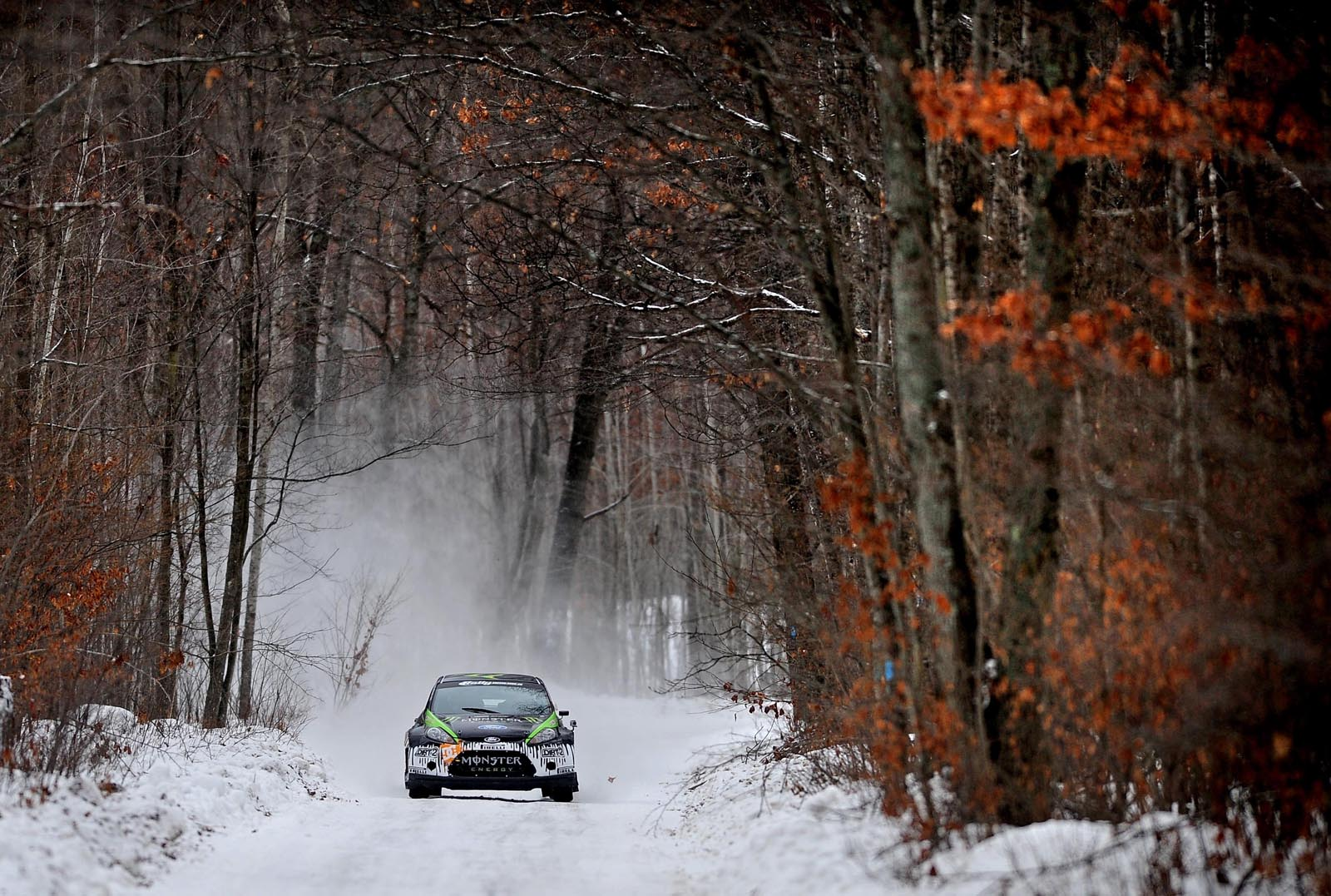
Sno* Drift Rally test drive

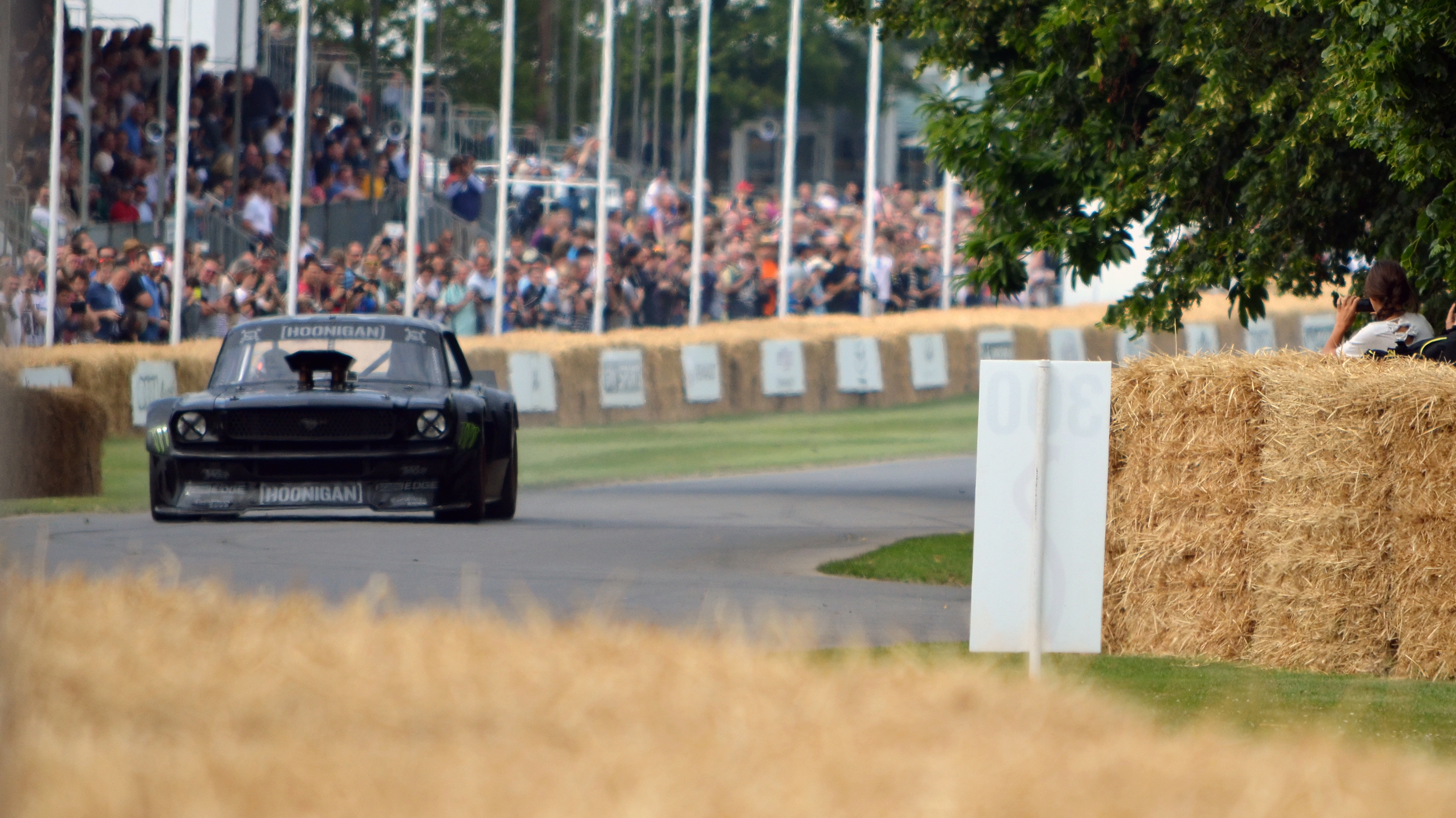
Ken Block's Mustang Hoonigan, known as "Hoonicorn", at the Goodwood Festival of Speed 2015

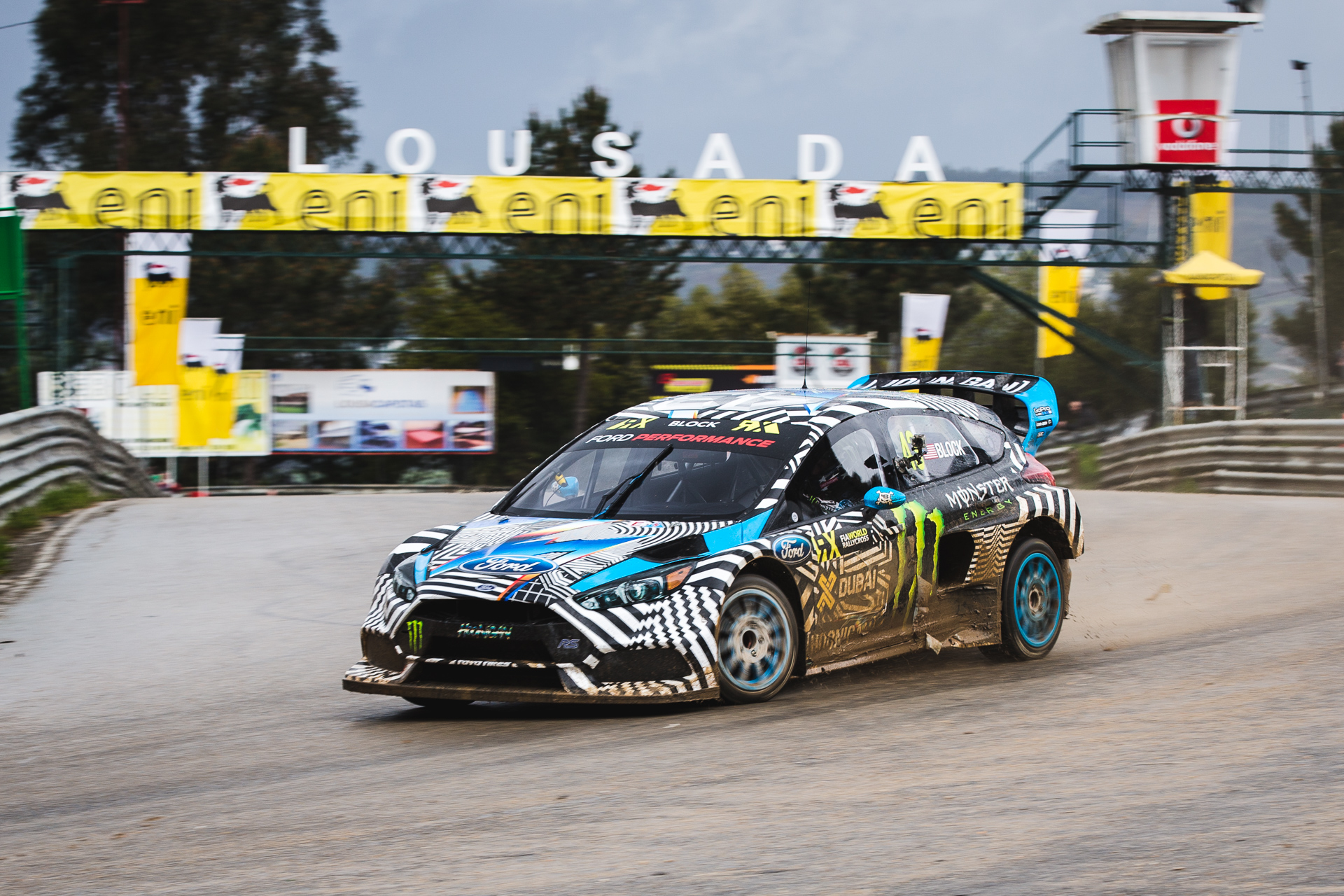
Ken Block at the 2016 World RX of Portugal

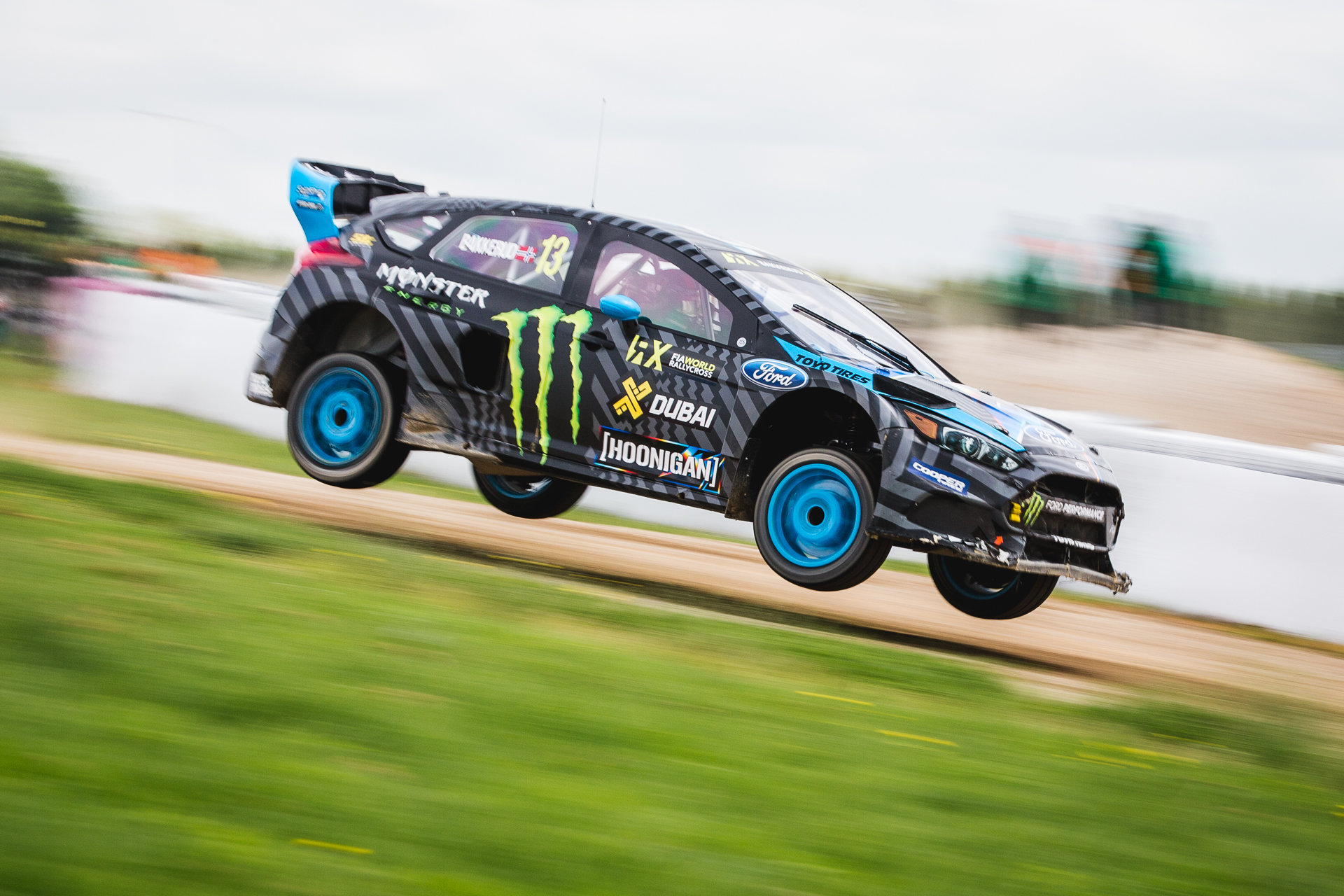
Andreas Bakkerud at the 2016 World RX of Belgium

== See also ==
- Gymkhana Grid
