= 2016 FIA World Rallycross Championship =

Auto racing championship

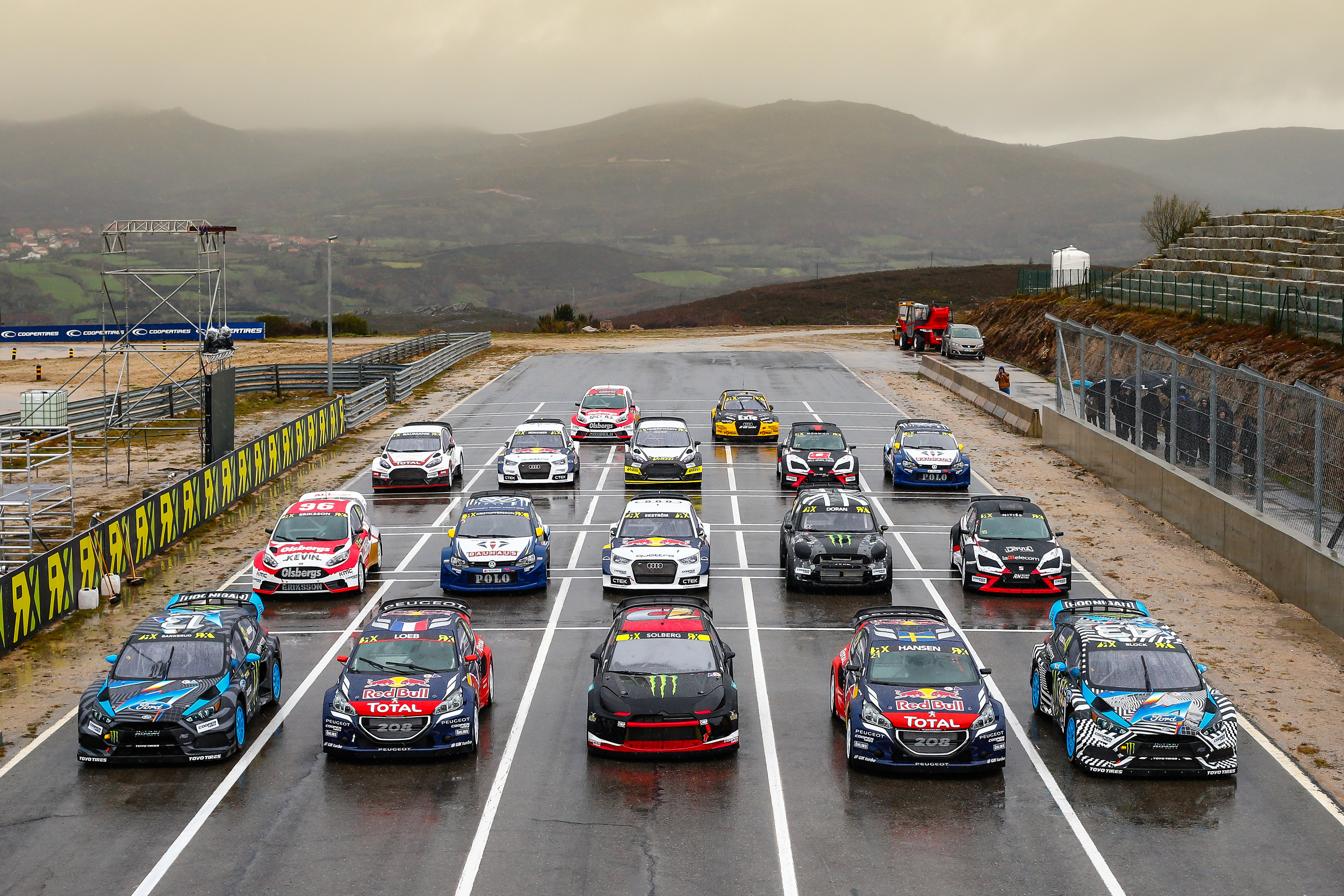
Atmosphere01POR16cm015

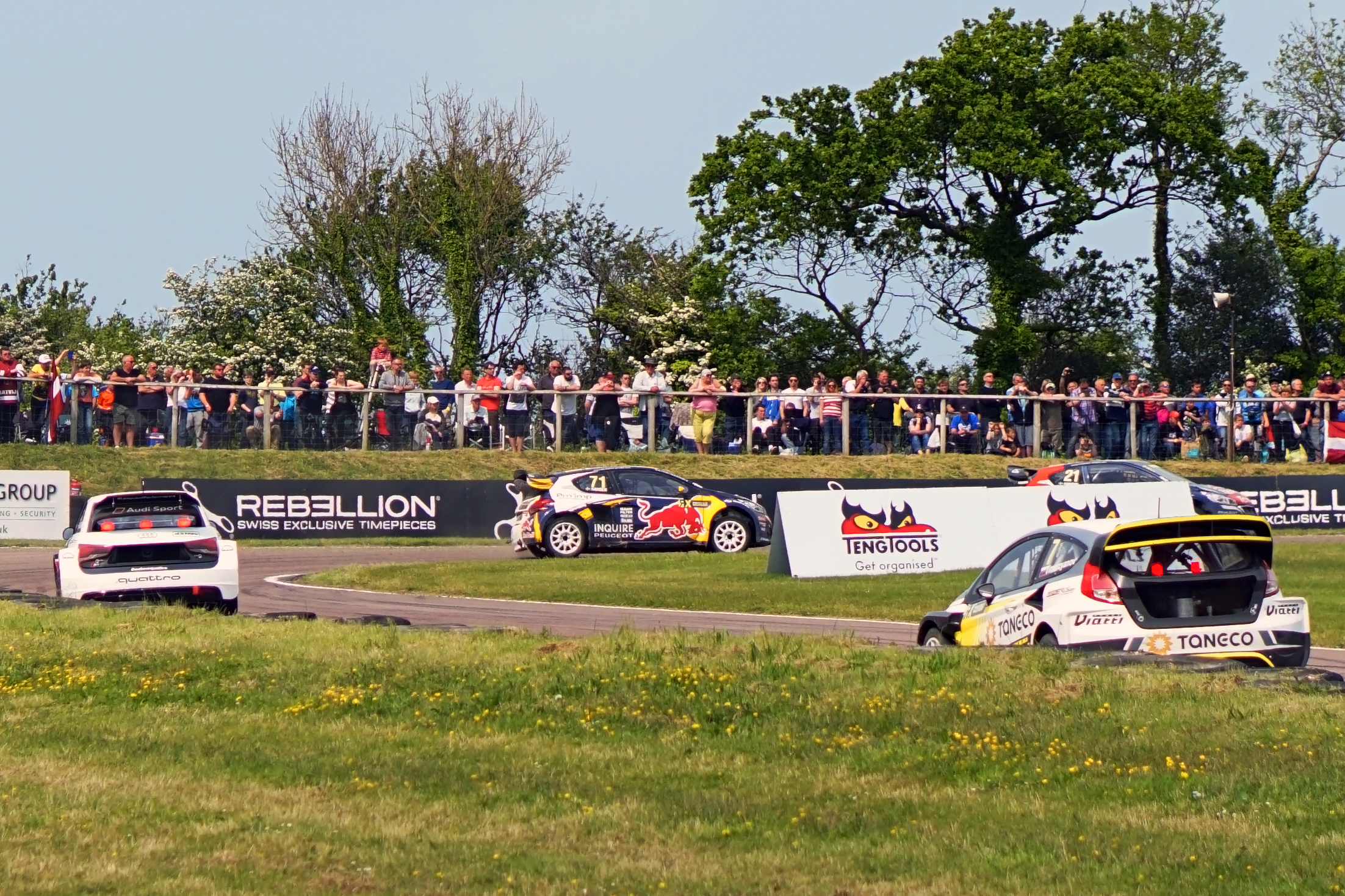
FIA World Rallycross Championship, Lydden Hill, 2016 (27329676041)

The 2016 FIA World Rallycross Championship presented by Monster Energy was the third season of the FIA World Rallycross Championship. The season consists of twelve rounds and started on 16 April with the Portuguese round at Montalegre. The season ended on 27 November, at Rosario, Santa Fe in Argentina.

Petter Solberg was the defending drivers' champion. Team Hansen-Peugeot were the defending teams' champions. After 11 rounds, Mattias Ekström clinched the Drivers Championship. His team EKS secured the teams championship at the final round in Argentina.

== Calendar ==
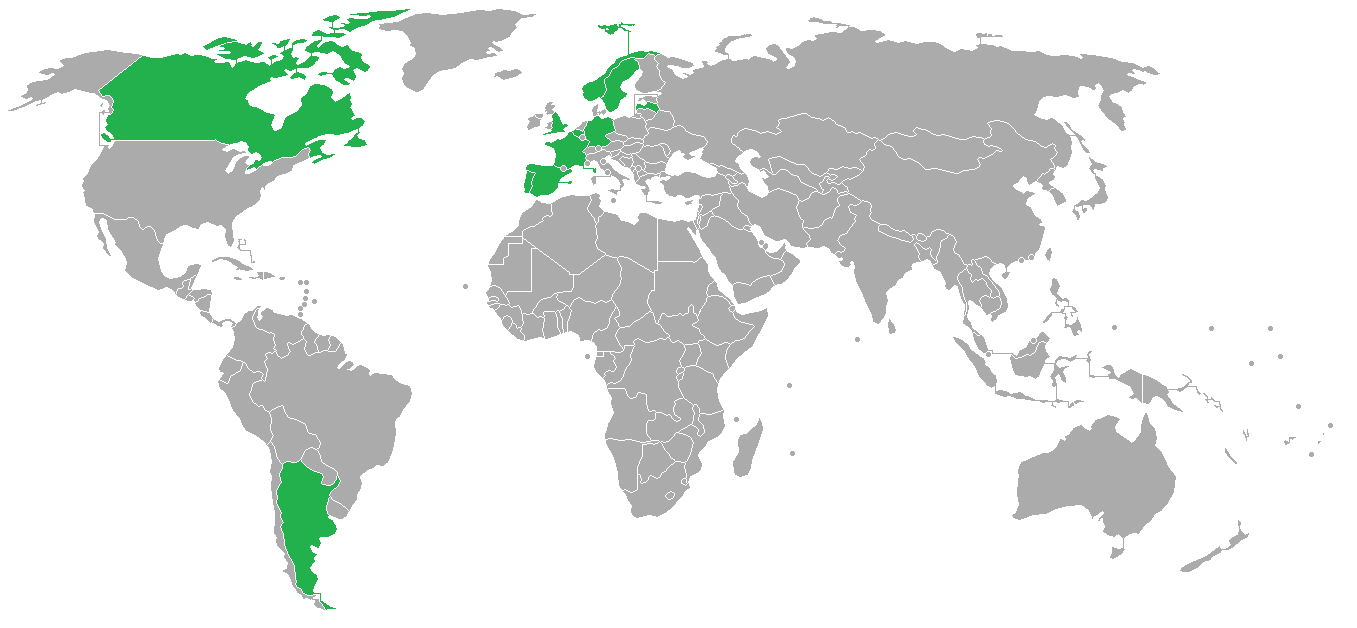
2016 World RX calendar by nations

On 30 October 2015 the 2016 calendar was announced, removing the rounds in Italy and Turkey and adding an event in Latvia. On 2 December 2015 the FIA World Motor Sport Council approved in Paris the 2016 FIA World Rallycross Championship calendar and confirmed the separation of European and World Rallycross heats during events. The RX Lites category was held in support of the World Championship, which consisted of seven events and a non-championship round in Canada.

Rnd.	Event	Dates	Venue	Class	Winner	Team	Report
1	World RX of Portugal	16–17 April	Pista Automóvel de Montalegre	Supercar	(Norway) Petter Solberg	(Sweden) Petter Solberg World RX Team¹	Report
2	(Germany) World RX of Hockenheim	7–8 May	Hockenheimring	Supercar	(Sweden) Mattias Ekström	(Sweden) EKS RX	Report
2	(Germany) World RX of Hockenheim	7–8 May	Hockenheimring	RX Lites	(Norway) Thomas Bryntesson	(Sweden) JC Raceteknik	Report
3	World RX of Belgium	14–15 May	Circuit Jules Tacheny Mettet	Supercar	(Sweden) Mattias Ekström	(Sweden) EKS RX	Report
3	World RX of Belgium	14–15 May	Circuit Jules Tacheny Mettet	RX Lites	(Norway) Thomas Bryntesson	(Sweden) JC Raceteknik	Report
4	(United Kingdom) World RX of Great Britain	28–29 May	Lydden Hill Race Circuit	Supercar	(Sweden) Mattias Ekström	(Sweden) EKS RX	Report
4	(United Kingdom) World RX of Great Britain	28–29 May	Lydden Hill Race Circuit	RX Lites	(France) Cyril Raymond	(Sweden) Olsbergs MSE	Report
5	World RX of Norway	11–12 June	Lånkebanen	Supercar	(Norway) Andreas Bakkerud	(United States) Hoonigan Racing Division	Report
5	World RX of Norway	11–12 June	Lånkebanen	RX Lites	(Norway) Thomas Bryntesson	(Sweden) JC Raceteknik	Report
6	World RX of Sweden	2–3 July	Höljesbanan	Supercar	(Norway) Andreas Bakkerud	(United States) Hoonigan Racing Division	Report
6	World RX of Sweden	2–3 July	Höljesbanan	RX Lites	(Sweden) Simon Olofsson	(Sweden) Simon Olofsson	Report
7	World RX of Canada	6–7 August	Circuit Trois-Rivières	Supercar	(Sweden) Timmy Hansen	(Sweden) Team Peugeot-Hansen	Report
7	World RX of Canada	6–7 August	Circuit Trois-Rivières	RX Lites²	(United States) Mitchell DeJong	(Sweden) Olsbergs MSE	Report
8	World RX of France	3–4 September	Circuit de Lohéac	Supercar	(Sweden) Johan Kristoffersson	Volkswagen RX Sweden	Report
9	(Spain) World RX of Barcelona	17–18 September	Circuit de Barcelona-Catalunya	Supercar	(Sweden) Mattias Ekström	(Sweden) EKS RX	Report
9	(Spain) World RX of Barcelona	17–18 September	Circuit de Barcelona-Catalunya	RX Lites	(France) Cyril Raymond	(Sweden) Olsbergs MSE	Report
10	World RX of Latvia	1–2 October	Biķernieku Kompleksā Sporta Bāze	Supercar	(France) Sébastien Loeb	(Sweden) Team Peugeot-Hansen	Report
10	World RX of Latvia	1–2 October	Biķernieku Kompleksā Sporta Bāze	RX Lites	(Norway) Sondre Evjen	(Sweden) JC Raceteknik	Report
11	World RX of Germany	15–16 October	Estering	Supercar	(Sweden) Kevin Eriksson	(Sweden) Olsbergs MSE	Report
12	World RX of Argentina	26–27 November	Autódromo Rosario	Supercar	(Norway) Andreas Bakkerud	(United States) Hoonigan Racing Division	Report

¹ = A one-car team is ineligible to score teams' championship points.

² = Non-championship round.

== Teams and drivers ==
=== Supercar ===
Permanent entries
Constructor	Entrant	Car	No.	Driver	Rounds
Audi	(Sweden) EKS RX	Audi S1	5	(Sweden) Mattias Ekström	All
Audi	(Sweden) EKS RX	Audi S1	57	(Finland) Toomas Heikkinen	All
Audi	(Sweden) Larsson Jernberg Motorsport	Audi A1	4	(Sweden) Robin Larsson	All
Citroën	(Sweden) Petter Solberg World RX Team	Citroën DS3	1	(Norway) Petter Solberg	All
Ford	(United States) Hoonigan Racing Division	Ford Focus RS	13	(Norway) Andreas Bakkerud	All
Ford	(United States) Hoonigan Racing Division	Ford Focus RS	43	(United States) Ken Block	All
Ford	(Sweden) Olsbergs MSE	Ford Fiesta ST	68	(Finland) Niclas Grönholm	1–11
Ford	(Sweden) Olsbergs MSE	Ford Fiesta ST	96	(Sweden) Kevin Eriksson	1–7, 9-12
Ford	(Sweden) Olsbergs MSE	Ford Fiesta ST	29	(France) Yann Le Jossec	8
Ford	(Sweden) Olsbergs MSE	Ford Fiesta ST	15	(Latvia) Reinis Nitišs	9-10, 12
Ford	World RX Team Austria	Ford Fiesta	6	(Latvia) Jānis Baumanis	All
Ford	World RX Team Austria	Ford Fiesta	7	(Russia) Timur Timerzyanov	All
Mini	(United Kingdom) JRM Racing	Mini Countryman	33	(United Kingdom) Liam Doran^{1}	1–6
Mini	(United Kingdom) JRM Racing	Mini Countryman	65	(France) Guerlain Chicherit	8–11
Mini	(United Kingdom) JRM Racing	Mini Countryman	37	(United Kingdom) Guy Wilks	9-10
Mini	(United Kingdom) JRM Racing	Mini Countryman	94	(United Kingdom) Nick Jones	12
Peugeot	(Sweden) Team Peugeot-Hansen	Peugeot 208	9	(France) Sébastien Loeb	All
Peugeot	(Sweden) Team Peugeot-Hansen	Peugeot 208	21	(Sweden) Timmy Hansen	All
Peugeot	(Sweden) Peugeot-Hansen Academy	Peugeot 208	17	(France) Davy Jeanney	1–6, 8-11
Peugeot	(Sweden) Peugeot-Hansen Academy	Peugeot 208	71	(Sweden) Kevin Hansen	1–2, 4, 8, 11
SEAT	(Germany) all-inkl.com Münnich Motorsport	SEAT Ibiza Cupra	15	(Latvia) Reinis Nitišs^{2}	1–8
SEAT	(Germany) all-inkl.com Münnich Motorsport	SEAT Ibiza Cupra	55	(Germany) René Münnich	1–11
SEAT	(Germany) all-inkl.com Münnich Motorsport	SEAT Ibiza Cupra	44	(Germany) Timo Scheider	9-10, 12
SEAT	(Germany) all-inkl.com Münnich Motorsport	SEAT Ibiza Cupra	24	(Norway) Tommy Rustad	11
SEAT	(Germany) all-inkl.com Münnich Motorsport	SEAT Ibiza Cupra	77	(Germany) René Münnich	12
Volkswagen	Volkswagen RX Sweden	Volkswagen Polo	3	(Sweden) Johan Kristoffersson	All
Volkswagen	Volkswagen RX Sweden	Volkswagen Polo	92	(Sweden) Anton Marklund	All
Non-permanent entries ineligible to score team points: Constructor / Entrant / Car / No. / Driver / Rounds; Audi / (Hungary) Racing-Com KFT / Audi A1 / 102 / (Hungary) Tamás Kárai / 8; Citroën / (France) DA Racing / Citroën DS3 / 87 / (France) Jean-Baptiste Dubourg / 2, 8; Citroën / (France) Hervé "Knapick" Lemonnier / Citroën DS3 / 84 / (France) "Knapick" / 8; Ford / (Portugal) Bompiso Racing Team / Ford Focus / 41 / (Portugal) Joaquim Santos / 1; Ford / World RX Team Austria / Ford Fiesta / 31 / (Austria) Max Pucher / 2; Ford / (Belgium) Ecurie Bayard ASBL / Ford Fiesta / 67 / (Belgium) François Duval / 3; Ford / (United Kingdom) Guy Wilks / Ford Fiesta / 37 / (United Kingdom) Guy Wilks / 4; Ford / (United Kingdom) Julian Godfrey / Ford Fiesta / 51 / (United Kingdom) Julian Godfrey / 4; Ford / (Sweden) Olsbergs MSE / Ford Fiesta / 23 / (Sweden) Richard Göransson / 6; Ford / (Sweden) Olsbergs MSE / Ford Fiesta / 113 / (France) Cyril Raymond / 11; Ford / (Republic of Ireland) Oliver O'Donovan / Ford Fiesta / 2 / (Republic of Ireland) Oliver O'Donovan / 8; Ford / (Belgium) "M.D.K" / Ford Fiesta / 49 / (Belgium) "M.D.K" / 8, 11; Ford / (France) Pascal Le Nouvel / Ford Fiesta / 98 / (France) Pascal Le Nouvel / 8; Ford / (Estonia) Reinsalu Sport / Ford Fiesta / 10 / (Estonia) Janno Ligur / 10; Ford / (Germany) Andreas Steffen / Ford Fiesta / 80 / (Germany) Andreas Steffen / 11; Kia / (Italy) Gigi Galli / Kia Rio / 25 / (Italy) Gigi Galli / 10-11; Mitsubishi / (Sweden) Eklund Motorsport / Mitsubishi Mirage / 60 / (Finland) Joni-Pekka Rajala / 11; Peugeot / (Sweden) Fredrik Salsten / Peugeot 208 / 11 / (Sweden) Fredrik Salsten / 8; Peugeot / (United Kingdom) Albatec Racing / Peugeot 208 / 24 / (Norway) Tommy Rustad / 8; Peugeot / (United Kingdom) Albatec Racing / Peugeot 208 / 26 / (United Kingdom) Andy Scott / 8; Peugeot / (United Kingdom) Albatec Racing / Peugeot 208 / 121 / (France) Philippe Maloigne / 8; Peugeot / (France) Patrick Guillerme / Peugeot 208 / 83 / (France) Patrick Guillerme / 8; Renault / (France) Fabien Chanoine / Renault Clio / 89 / (France) Fabien Chanoine / 8; Škoda / (Lithuania) Motorsport LT / Škoda Fabia / 88 / (Lithuania) Nerijus Naujokaitis / 10; Volkswagen / Volkswagen RX Sweden / Volkswagen Polo / 34 / (United States) Tanner Foust / 4, 11; Volkswagen / (Sweden) Hedströms Motorsport / Volkswagen Polo / 8 / (Sweden) Peter Hedström / 11; Volkswagen / (Sweden) Per Eklund Motorsport / Volkswagen Beetle / 53 / (Norway) Alexander Hvaal / 11

* Entries in grey denote one-car teams which are ineligible to score teams championship points.

^{1} = JRM has announced the termination of Liam Doran's contract with the team following the sixth round (Sweden) of the championship.

^{2} = Nitišs left the Münnich Motorsport team following event eight (France) and returned to Olsbergs MSE for event nine (Barcelona).

=== RX Lites ===
All teams used identical Olsbergs MSE-produced Ford Fiestas

Entries
Entrant	No.	Driver	Rounds
(Sweden) Olsbergs MSE	13	(France) Cyril Raymond	1-7
(Sweden) Olsbergs MSE	33	(Kenya) Tejas Hirani	1-7
(Sweden) Olsbergs MSE	64	(United Arab Emirates) Saeed Bintouq	3-4, NC, 6
(Sweden) Olsbergs MSE	75	(Germany) Patrick Simon	1
(Sweden) Olsbergs MSE	40	(United Kingdom) Dan Rooke	3
(Sweden) Olsbergs MSE	21	(Sweden) Marcus Hoglund	5
(Sweden) Olsbergs MSE	24	(United States) Mitchell DeJong	NC
(Sweden) Olsbergs MSE	45	(Finland) Miki Weckström	NC
(Sweden) Olsbergs MSE	27	(Canada) Andrew Ranger	NC
(Sweden) Olsbergs MSE	51	(Sweden) Sandra Hultgren	NC
(Sweden) Olsbergs MSE	53	(United States) Cole Keatts	NC
(Sweden) JC Raceteknik	99	(Norway) Joachim Hvaal	1-7
(Sweden) JC Raceteknik	16	(Norway) Thomas Bryntesson	1-7
(Sweden) JC Raceteknik	69	(Norway) Sondre Evjen	1-7
(Sweden) JC Raceteknik	96	(Norway) Henrik Krogstad	4
(Sweden) JC Raceteknik	6	(Sweden) William Nilsson	5
(Sweden) JC Raceteknik	46	(Latvia) Martin Lapins	7
(Sweden) JC Raceteknik	3	(Sweden) Per Björnson	5
(Sweden) JC Raceteknik	14	(Sweden) Magnus Hansen	5
(Sweden) JC Raceteknik	98	(Sweden) Oliver Eriksson	NC
(Sweden) Santosh Motorsport	86	(Sweden) Santosh Berggren	5
(Finland) Set Promotion	8	(Norway) Simon Wago Syversen	1-7
(Turkey) Toksport	18	(Turkey) Ali Turkkan	3
(Sweden) Helmia Motorsport	91	(Sweden) Jonathan Walfridsson	4-5
(Latvia) Sport Racing Technologies	55	(Russia) Vasily Gryazin	7
(Poland) Lotto Team	66	(Andorra) Albert Llovera	4-6
(United States) Dirtfish Motorsports	121	(United States) Conner Martell	NC, 7
(Belgium) ICEPOL Racing Team	26	(Belgium) Regis Gosselin	2
(Sweden) Westlund Entreprenad	47	(Sweden) Alexander Westlund	1-2, 5
(Sweden) Simon Olofsson	52	(Sweden) Simon Olofsson	1-7
(Norway) Thomas Holmen	56	(Norway) Thomas Holmen	4-7
(Sweden) Johan Larsson	2	(Sweden) Johan Larsson	5

NC represents participation in the non-championship round in Canada.

== Championship Standings ==
=== FIA World Rallycross Championship for Drivers ===
Pos.	Driver	POR (Portugal)	HOC (Germany)	BEL (Belgium)	GBR (United Kingdom)	NOR (Norway)	SWE (Sweden)	CAN (Canada)	FRA (France)	BAR (Spain)	LAT (Latvia)	GER (Germany)	ARG (Argentina)	Points
1	(Sweden) Mattias Ekström	10	1	1	1	3	6	8	8	1	2	5	5	272
2	(Sweden) Johan Kristoffersson	6	7	6	12	7	5	3	1	6	5	6	2	240
3	(Norway) Andreas Bakkerud	4	12	14	6	1	1	2	2	7	4	3	1	239
4	(Norway) Petter Solberg	1	4	3	2	4	7	5	4	10	19	2	7	239
5	(France) Sébastien Loeb	5	10	2	10	5	2	9	3	8	1	9	8	209
6	(Sweden) Timmy Hansen	12	18	7	3	2	3	1	11	2	3	8	13	178
7	(Finland) Toomas Heikkinen	3	2	16	11	9	9	4	15	9	9	10	3	150
8	(Russia) Timur Timerzyanov	16	17	8	5	6	14	7	30	3	6	14	9	117
9	(Sweden) Robin Larsson	2	6	13	15	10	8	16	12	5	12	13	6	109
10	(Latvia) Jānis Baumanis	14	8	9	7	8	10	15	26	4	8	7	12	109
11	(Sweden) Kevin Eriksson	7	11	10	8	13	15	11		11	13	1	16	92
12	(France) Davy Jeanney	8	9	11	13	11	12		7	12	10	11		86
13	(Sweden) Anton Marklund	9	15	4	9	15	4	6	18	14	15	15	11	76
14	(United States) Ken Block	18	3	19	14	14	13	10	6	16	16	12	15	63
15	(Sweden) Kevin Hansen	13	19		4				9			4		52
16	(Latvia) Reinis Nitišs	15	13	12	21	12	18	13	5	13	11		10	44
17	(Finland) Niclas Grönholm	17	14	15	16	16	11	12	14	15	18	19		28
18	(Germany) Timo Scheider									17	7		4	25
19	(Belgium) François Duval			5										18
20	(United Kingdom) Liam Doran	10	5	17	19	17	16							9
21	(United Kingdom) Andy Scott								10					6
22	(Norway) Tommy Rustad								13			25		4
23	(United Kingdom) Guy Wilks				17					19	14			3
24	(France) Jean-Baptiste Dubourg		16						17					1
25	(Sweden) Peter Hedström											16		1
26	(Germany) René Münnich	19	20	18	18	18	19	14	16	18	22	24	14	-3
Pos.	Driver	POR (Portugal)	HOC (Germany)	BEL (Belgium)	GBR (United Kingdom)	NOR (Norway)	SWE (Sweden)	CAN (Canada)	FRA (France)	BAR (Spain)	LAT (Latvia)	GER (Germany)	ARG (Argentina)	Points

=== FIA World Rallycross Championship for Teams ===
Pos.	Team	No.	Drivers	Points
1	(Sweden) EKS RX	5	(Sweden) Mattias Ekström	422
1	(Sweden) EKS RX	57	(Finland) Toomas Heikkinen	422
2	(Sweden) Team Peugeot-Hansen	9	(France) Sébastien Loeb	387
2	(Sweden) Team Peugeot-Hansen	21	(Sweden) Timmy Hansen	387
3	Volkswagen RX Sweden	3	(Sweden) Johan Kristoffersson	316
3	Volkswagen RX Sweden	92	(Sweden) Anton Marklund	316
4	(United States) Hoonigan Racing Division	13	(Norway) Andreas Bakkerud	302
4	(United States) Hoonigan Racing Division	43	(United States) Ken Block	302
5	World RX Team Austria	6	(Latvia) Jānis Baumanis	226
5	World RX Team Austria	7	(Russia) Timur Timerzyanov	226
6	(Sweden) Olsbergs MSE	68	(Finland) Niclas Grönholm	132
6	(Sweden) Olsbergs MSE	96	(Sweden) Kevin Eriksson	132
7	(Germany) all-inkl.com Münnich Motorsport	15	(Latvia) Reinis Nitišs	67
7	(Germany) all-inkl.com Münnich Motorsport	55	(Germany) René Münnich	67

=== RX Lites Cup ===
Pos.	Driver	HOC (Germany)	BEL (Belgium)	GBR (United Kingdom)	NOR (Norway)	SWE (Sweden)	CAN (Canada)	BAR (Spain)	LAT (Latvia)	Points
1	(France) Cyril Raymond	2	6	1	2	2		1	8	175
2	(Norway) Thomas Bryntesson	1	1	2	1	4		2	7	167
3	(Sweden) Simon Olofsson	7	2	3	3	1		4	4	151
4	(Norway) Joachim Hvaal	3	3	4	6	7		7	5	136
5	(Norway) Simon Wago Syversen	6	5	5	8	11		3	10	115
6	(Norway) Sondre Evjen	9	4	6	10	13		8	1	98
7	(Kenya) Tejas Hirani	8	7	7	5	16		6	3	96
8	(Norway) Thomas Holmen				9	9		5	6	55
9	(Sweden) Alexander Westlund	4	9		5					38
10	(United Arab Emirates) Saeed Bintouq			10	7		2	10		23 (30*)
11	(Germany) Patrick Simon	5								21
12	(Sweden) Marcus Hoglund					6				19
13	(Andorra) Albert Llovera				11	17		9		17
14	(Sweden) Johan Larsson					3				17
15	(United States) Conner Martell						4		2	16 (21*)
16	(Norway) Henrik Krogstad				4					15
17	(Russia) Vasily Gryazin								9	14
18	(United Kingdom) Dan Rooke			8						13
19	(Sweden) William Nilsson					8				13
20	(Belgium) Regis Gosselin		8							12
21	(Latvia) Martin Lapins								11	11
22	(Turkey) Ali Turkkan			9						11
23	(Sweden) Per Björnson					10				10
24	(Sweden) Jonathan Walfridsson				12	15				8
25	(Sweden) Magnus Hansen					12				6
26	(Sweden) Santosh Berggren					14				3
27	(United States) Mitchell DeJong						1			0 (27*)
28	(Finland) Miki Weckström						5			0 (25*)
29	(Sweden) Oliver Eriksson						3			0 (22*)
30	(Canada) Andrew Ranger						6			0 (17*)
31	(Sweden) Sandra Hultgren						7			0 (15*)
32	(United States) Cole Keatts						8			0 (12*)
Pos.	Driver	HOC (Germany)	BEL (Belgium)	GBR (United Kingdom)	NOR (Norway)	SWE (Sweden)	CAN (Canada)	BAR (Spain)	LAT (Latvia)	Points
