= 2016 World RX of Canada =

Rallycross event

- Round 7 of 12 in the 2016 FIA World Rallycross Championship
- Date: 6–7 August 2016
- Location: Trois-Rivières, Quebec
- Venue: Circuit Trois-Rivières

Results
Heat winners
- Heat 1: (Norway) Petter Solberg; Petter Solberg World RX Team
- Heat 2: (Norway) Petter Solberg; Petter Solberg World RX Team
- Heat 3: Johan Kristoffersson; Volkswagen RX Sweden
- Heat 4: (Norway) Petter Solberg; Petter Solberg World RX Team
Semi-final winners
- Semi-final 1: (Norway) Petter Solberg; Petter Solberg World RX Team
- Semi-final 2: (Norway) Andreas Bakkerud; Hoonigan Racing Division
Final
- First: (Sweden) Timmy Hansen; Team Peugeot-Hansen
- Second: (Norway) Andreas Bakkerud; Hoonigan Racing Division
- Third: Johan Kristoffersson; Volkswagen RX Sweden

World RX layout of Circuit Trois-Rivières

The 2016 World RX of Canada was the seventh round of the third season of the FIA World Rallycross Championship. The event was held at the Circuit Trois-Rivières in Trois-Rivières, Quebec.

== Heats ==
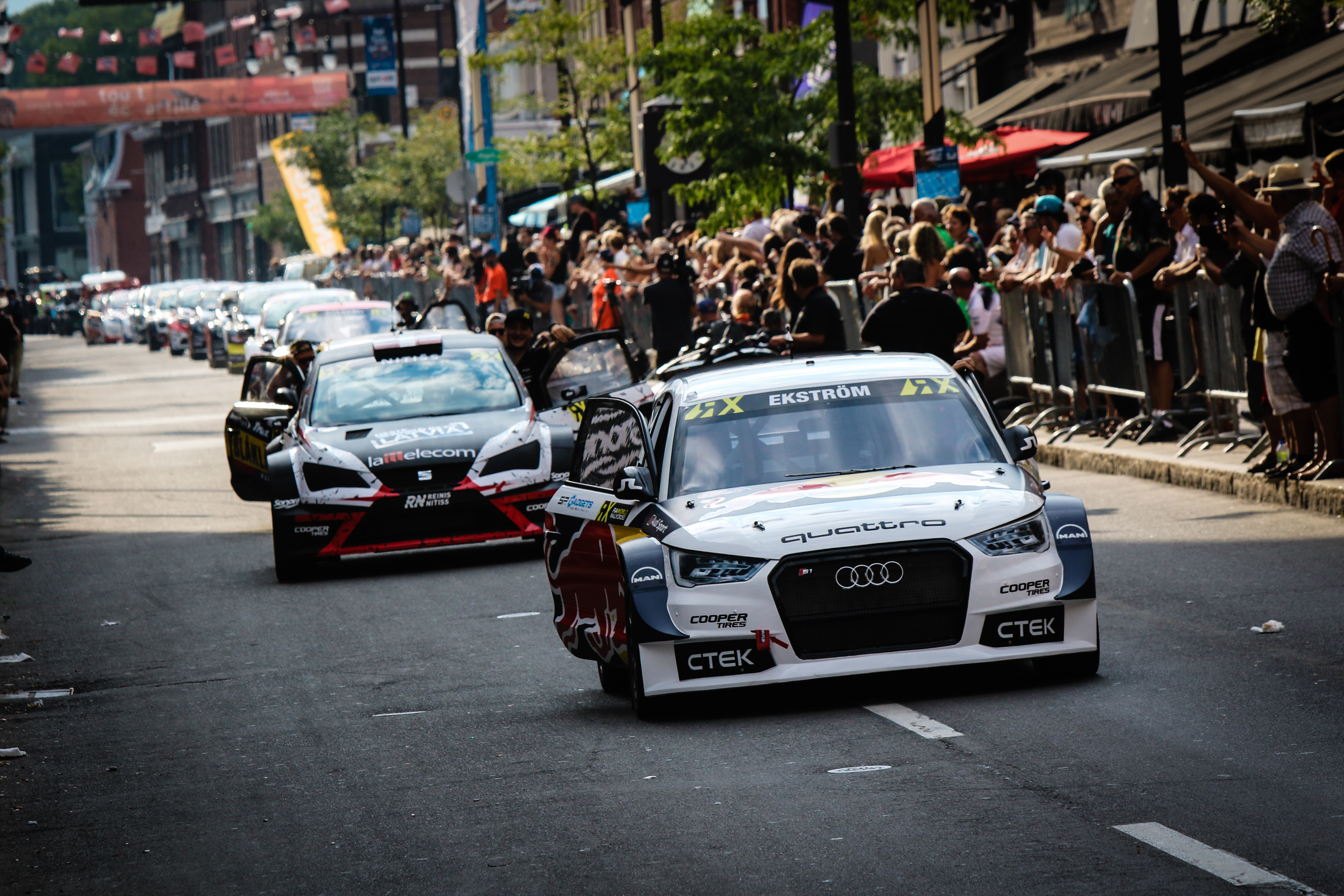
The pre-event drivers' parade

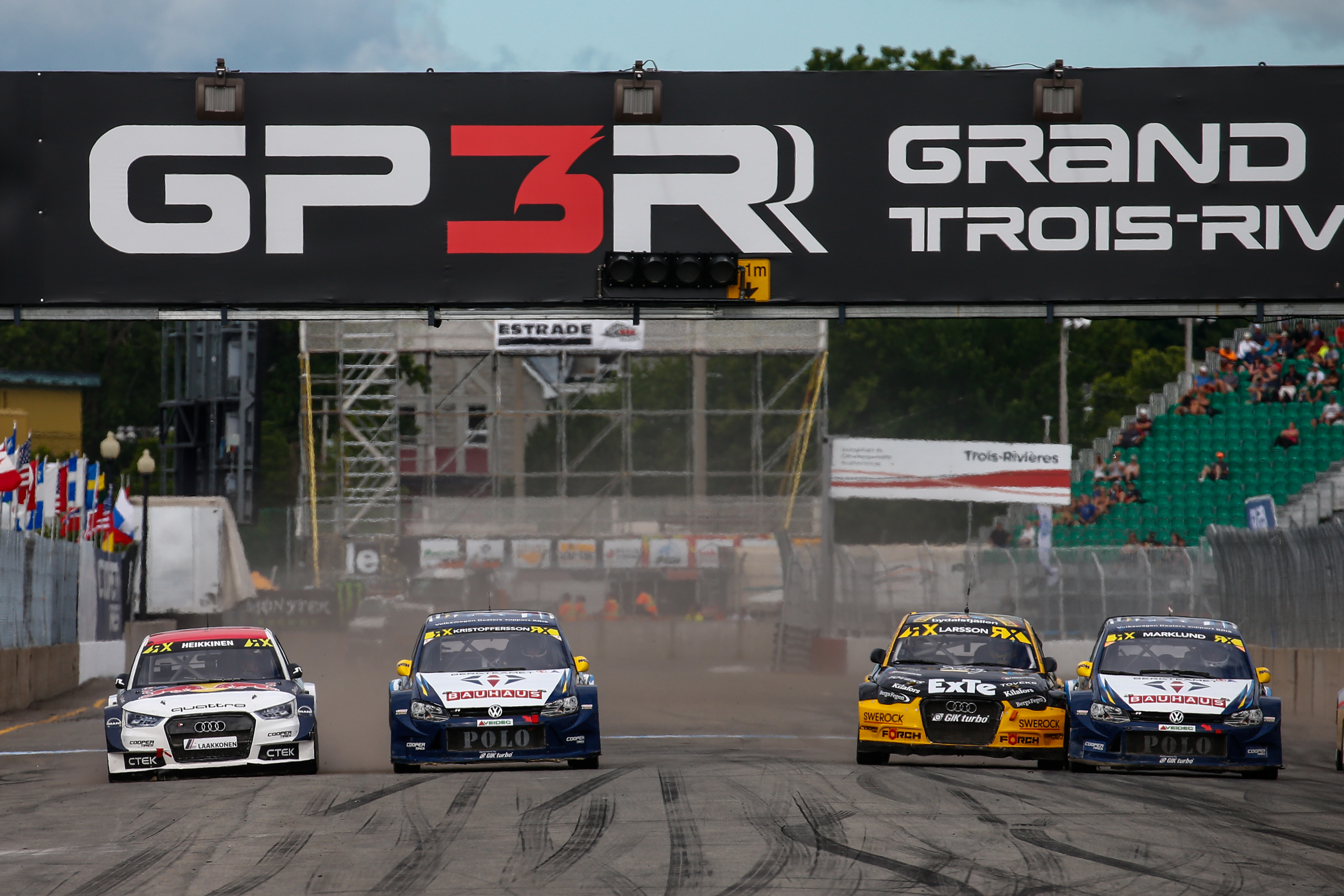
Toomas Heikkinen, Johan Kristoffersson, Robin Larsson and Anton Marklund

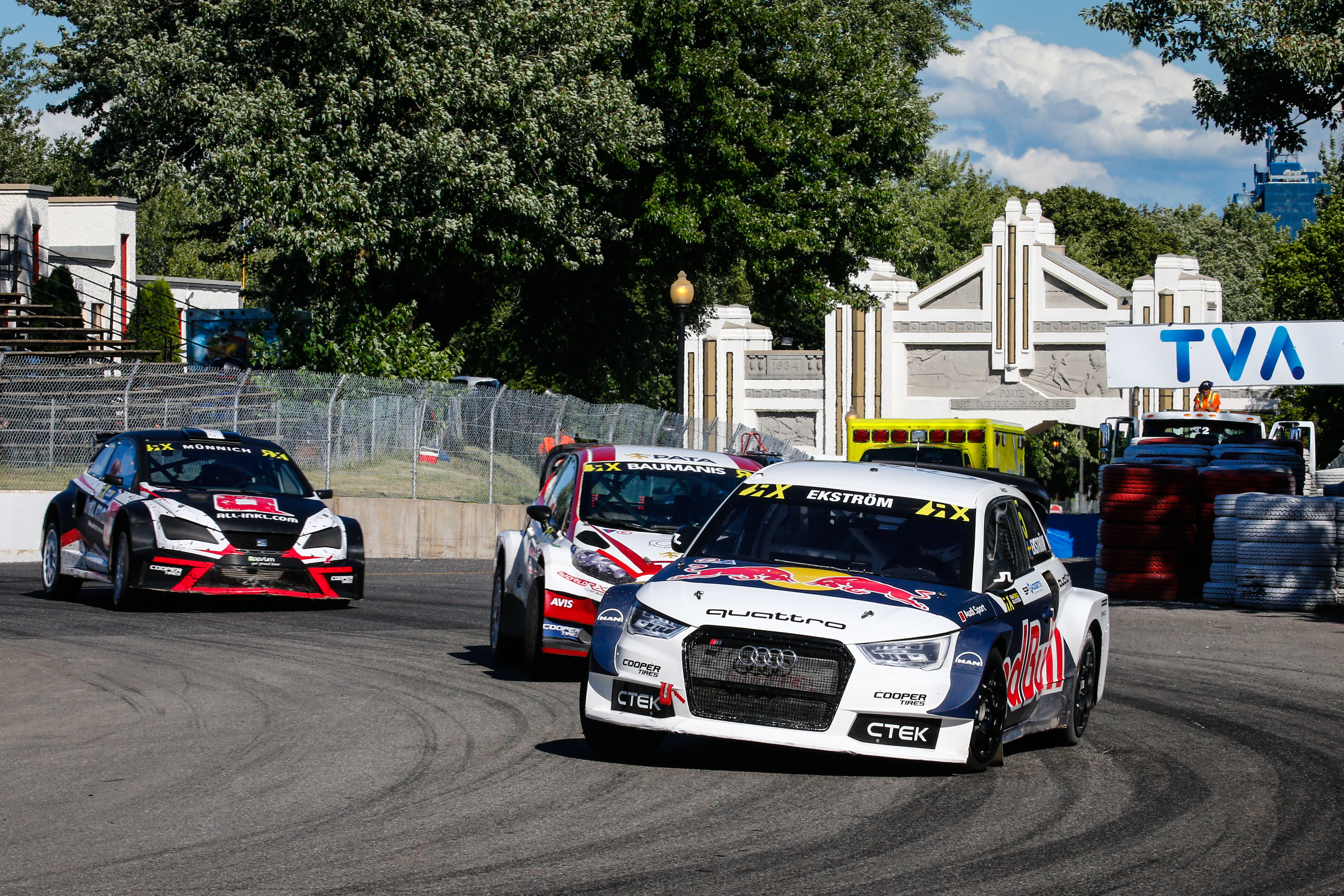
Mattias Ekström, Jānis Baumanis and René Münnich

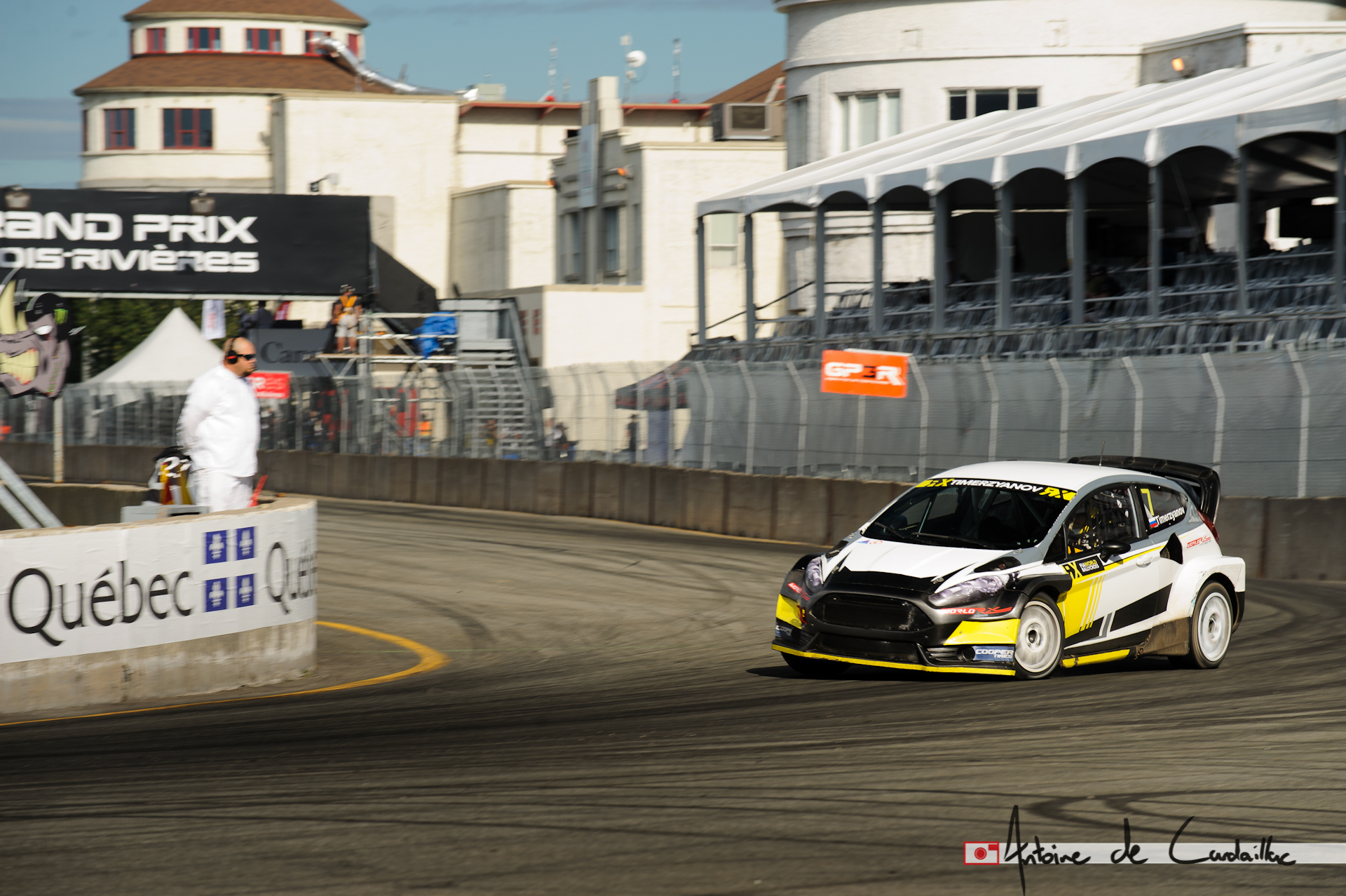
Timur Timerzyanov was disqualified from his Semi-Final

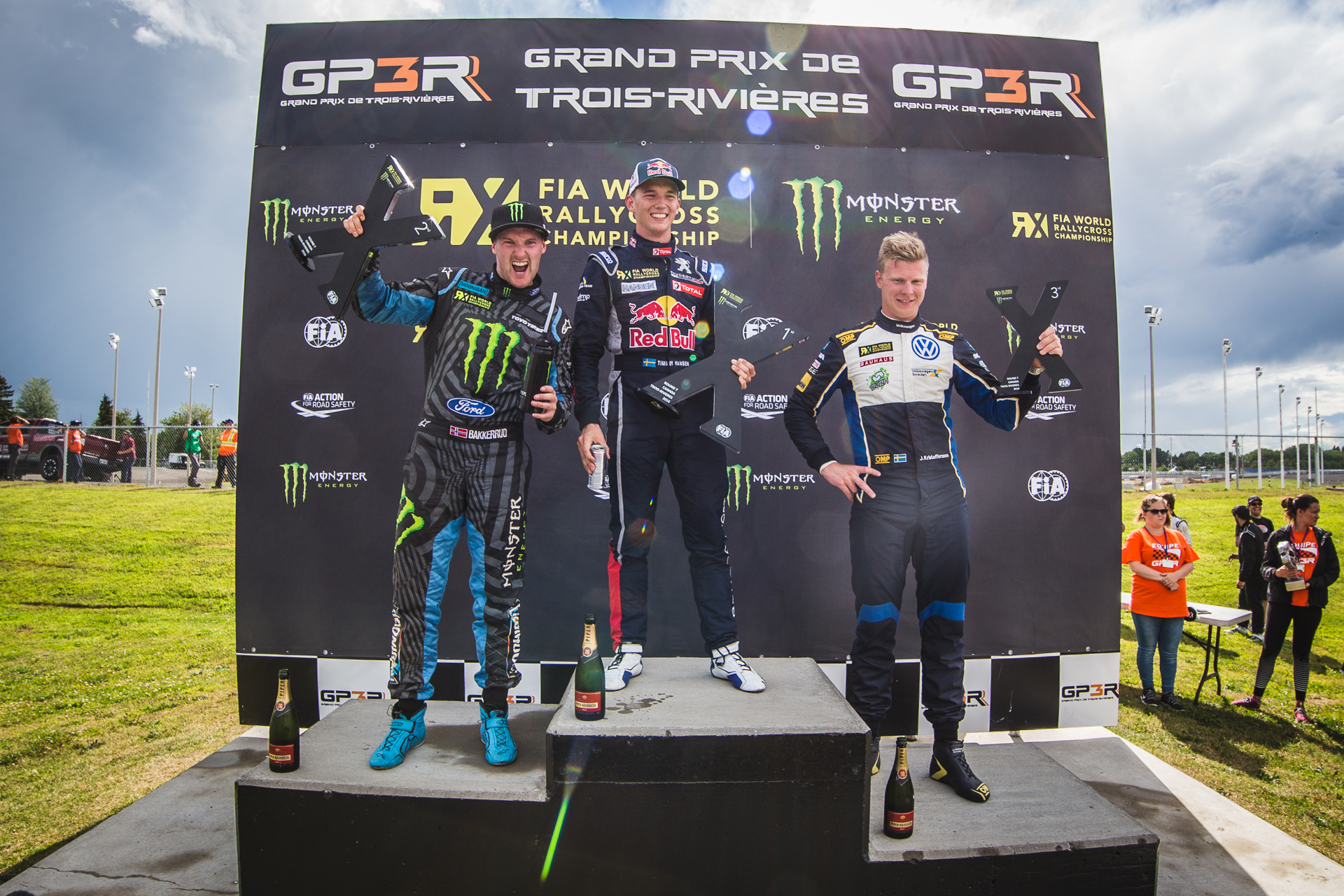
Event podium

Pos.	No.	Driver	Team	Car	Q1	Q2	Q3	Q4	Pts
1	1	(Norway) Petter Solberg	Petter Solberg World RX Team	Citroën DS3	1st	1st	8th	1st	16
2	7	(Russia) Timur Timerzyanov	World RX Team Austria	Ford Fiesta	2nd	2nd	7th	4th	15
3	3	(Sweden) Johan Kristoffersson	Volkswagen RX Sweden	Volkswagen Polo	4th	7th	1st	6th	14
4	5	(Sweden) Mattias Ekström	EKS RX	Audi S1	12th	4th	3rd	3rd	13
5	9	(France) Sébastien Loeb	Team Peugeot-Hansen	Peugeot 208	8th	3rd	2nd	12th	12
6	13	(Norway) Andreas Bakkerud	Hoonigan Racing Division	Ford Focus RS	3rd	5th	5th	10th	11
7	43	(United States) Ken Block	Hoonigan Racing Division	Ford Focus RS	5th	13th	11th	2nd	10
8	57	(Finland) Toomas Heikkinen	EKS RX	Audi S1	6th	6th	4th	15th	9
9	92	(Sweden) Anton Marklund	Volkswagen RX Sweden	Volkswagen Polo	9th	9th	9th	8th	8
10	21	(Sweden) Timmy Hansen	Team Peugeot-Hansen	Peugeot 208	10th	16th	6th	5th	7
11	68	(Finland) Niclas Grönholm	Olsbergs MSE	Ford Fiesta ST	14th	10th	12th	7th	6
12	96	(Sweden) Kevin Eriksson	Olsbergs MSE	Ford Fiesta ST	7th	11th	15th	13th	5
13	15	(Latvia) Reinis Nitišs	All-Inkl.com Münnich Motorsport	SEAT Ibiza	15th	14th	13th	11th	4
14	55	(Germany) René Münnich	All-Inkl.com Münnich Motorsport	SEAT Ibiza	13th	15th	14th	14th	3
15	6	(Latvia) Jānis Baumanis	World RX Team Austria	Ford Fiesta	11th	12th	16th	9th	2
16	4	(Sweden) Robin Larsson	Larsson Jernberg Motorsport	Audi A1	16th	8th	10th	16th	1

== Semi-finals ==
Semi-final 1

Pos.	No.	Driver	Team	Time	Pts
1	1	(Norway) Petter Solberg	Petter Solberg World RX Team	4:57.692	6
2	3	(Sweden) Johan Kristoffersson	Volkswagen RX Sweden	+4.701	5
3	92	(Sweden) Anton Marklund	Volkswagen RX Sweden	+7.097	4
4	9	(France) Sébastien Loeb	Team Peugeot-Hansen	+10.175	3
5	43	(United States) Ken Block	Hoonigan Racing Division	DNF	2
6	68	(Finland) Niclas Grönholm	Olsbergs MSE	DNF	1

Semi-final 2

Pos.	No.	Driver	Team	Time	Pts
1	13	(Norway) Andreas Bakkerud	Hoonigan Racing Division	5:00.970	6
2	57	(Finland) Toomas Heikkinen	EKS RX	+1.418	5
3	21	(Sweden) Timmy Hansen	Team Peugeot-Hansen	+2.981	4
4	96	(Sweden) Kevin Eriksson	Olsbergs MSE	+8.088	3
5	5	(Sweden) Mattias Ekström	EKS RX	DNF	2
	7	(Russia) Timur Timerzyanov	World RX Team Austria	EX	0

== Final ==
Pos.	No.	Driver	Team	Time	Pts
1	21	(Sweden) Timmy Hansen	Team Peugeot-Hansen	5:17.826	8
2	13	(Norway) Andreas Bakkerud	Hoonigan Racing Division	+1.077	5
3	3	(Sweden) Johan Kristoffersson	Volkswagen RX Sweden	+1.557	4
4	57	(Finland) Toomas Heikkinen	EKS RX	+4.061	3
5	1	(Norway) Petter Solberg	Petter Solberg World RX Team	+4.608	2
6	92	(Sweden) Anton Marklund	Volkswagen RX Sweden	+5.810	1

== Standings after the event ==
Pos.	Driver	Pts	Gap
1	(Norway) Petter Solberg	161	
2	(Sweden) Mattias Ekström	157	+4
3	(Norway) Andreas Bakkerud	132	+29
4	(Sweden) Johan Kristoffersson	129	+32
5	(France) Sébastien Loeb	121	+40

Previous race: 2016 World RX of Sweden	FIA World Rallycross Championship; 2016 season	Next race: 2016 World RX of France
Previous race: 2015 World RX of Canada	World RX of Canada	Next race: 2017 World RX of Canada
