= 2016 World RX of Sweden =

Rallycross event

- Round 6 of 12 in the 2016 FIA World Rallycross Championship
- Date: 2–3 July 2016
- Location: Höljes, Värmland
- Venue: Höljesbanan

Results
Heat winners
- Heat 1: (France) Sébastien Loeb; Team Peugeot-Hansen
- Heat 2: Johan Kristoffersson; Volkswagen RX Sweden
- Heat 3: (Norway) Petter Solberg; Petter Solberg World RX Team
- Heat 4: (Norway) Andreas Bakkerud; Hoonigan Racing Division
Semi-final winners
- Semi-final 1: (Sweden) Timmy Hansen; Team Peugeot-Hansen
- Semi-final 2: (Norway) Andreas Bakkerud; Hoonigan Racing Division
Final
- First: (Norway) Andreas Bakkerud; Hoonigan Racing Division
- Second: (France) Sébastien Loeb; Team Peugeot-Hansen
- Third: (Sweden) Timmy Hansen; Team Peugeot-Hansen

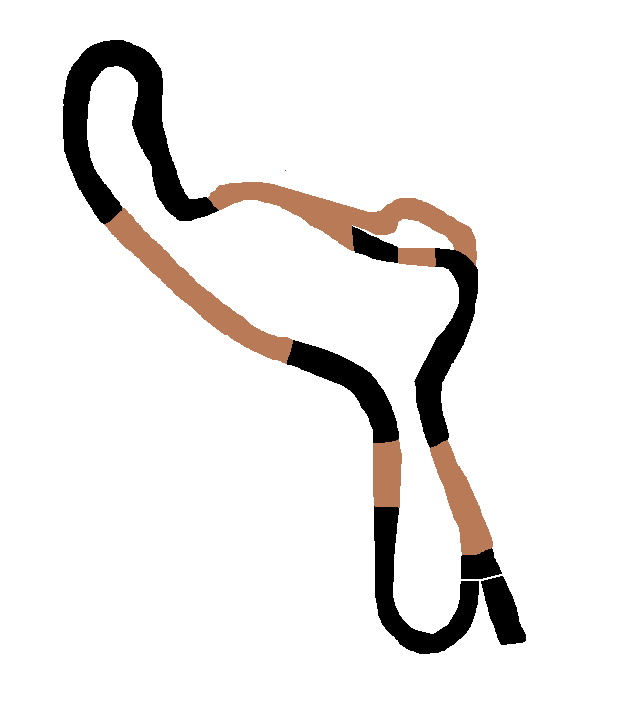
Rallycross layout of the Höljesbanan

The 2016 World RX of Sweden was the sixth round of the third season of the FIA World Rallycross Championship and the fifth round of the forty-first season of the FIA European Rallycross Championship. The event was held at the Höljesbanan in the village of Höljes, Värmland.

== Supercar ==
=== Heats ===
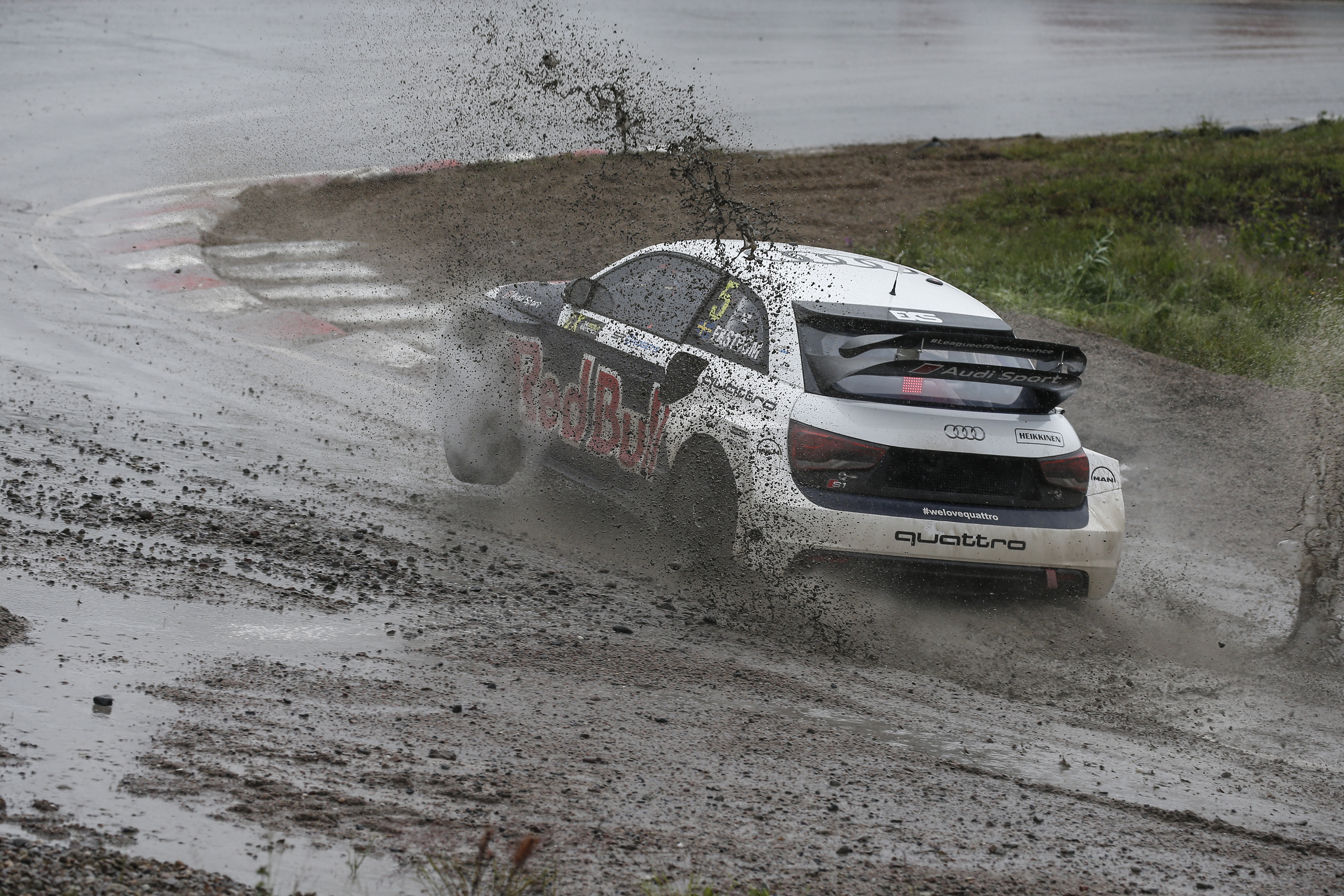
Rain and mud made for tricky conditions on the Saturday

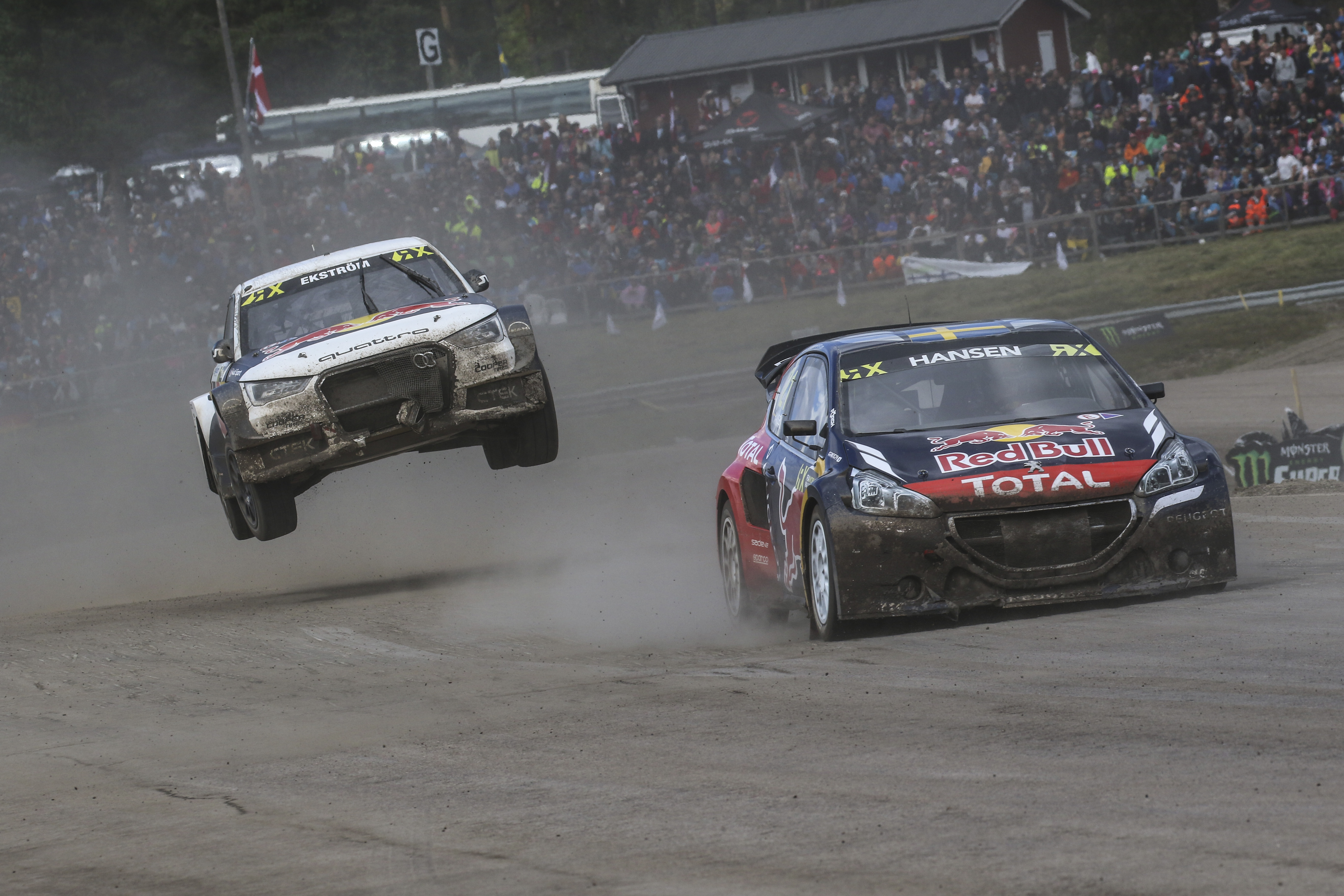
Local drivers Timmy Hansen and Mattias Ekström resumed their battle from the previous year in the semis

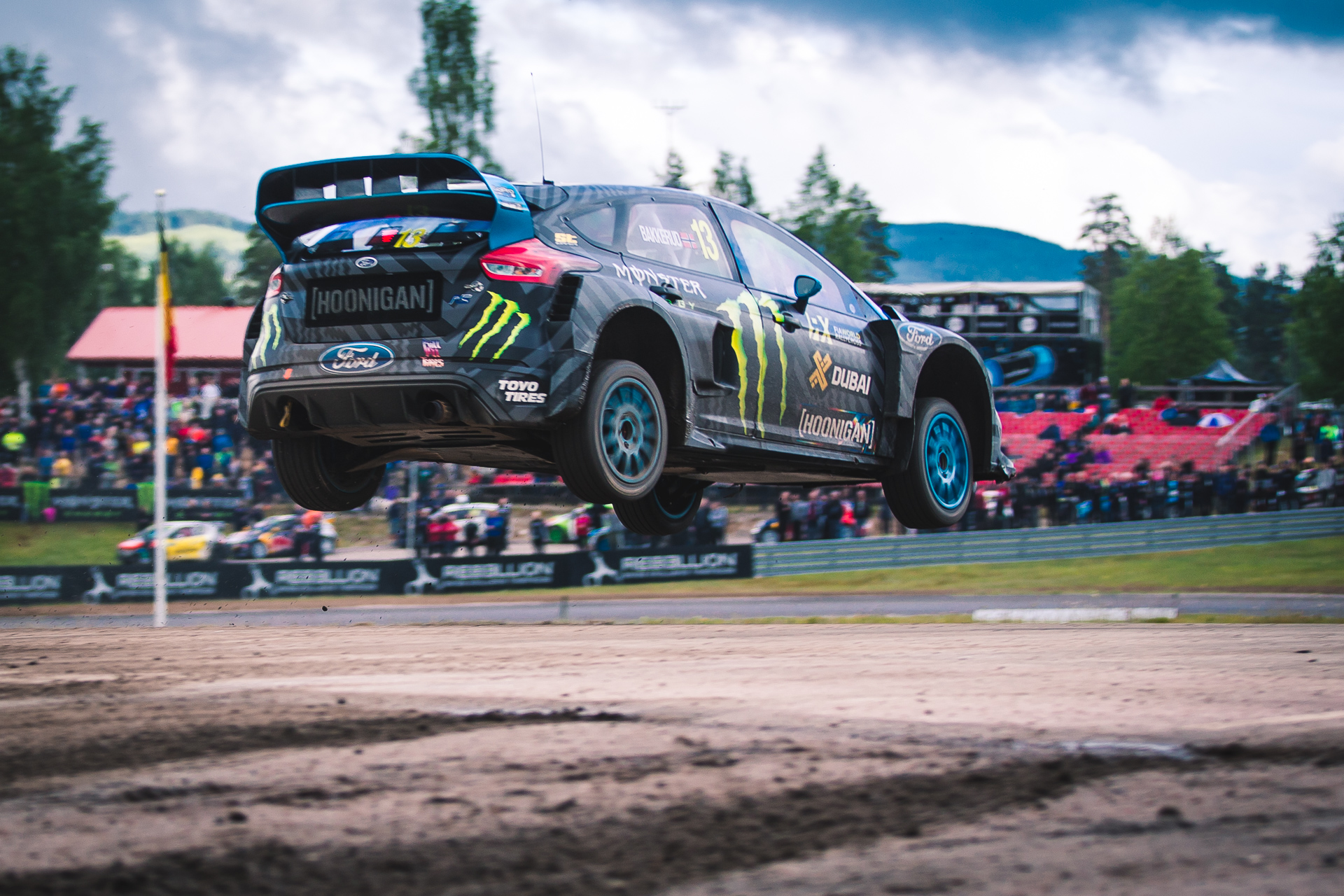
Andreas Bakkerud of Norway won his second event in a row

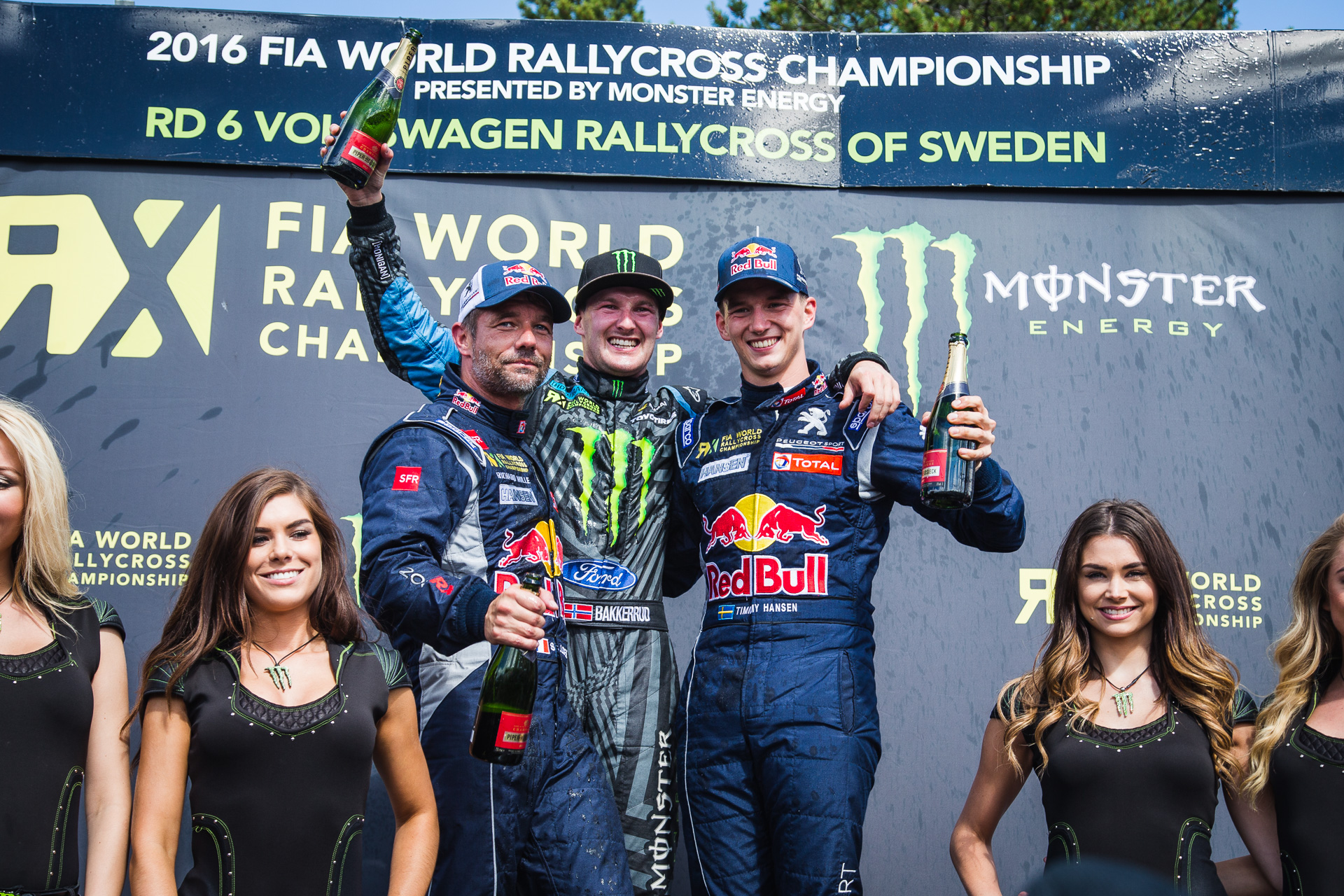
Event podium, with Sébastien Loeb in second and Hansen third

Pos.	No.	Driver	Team	Car	Q1	Q2	Q3	Q4	Pts
1	3	(Sweden) Johan Kristoffersson	Volkswagen RX Sweden	Volkswagen Polo	2nd	1st	4th	4th	16
2	13	(Norway) Andreas Bakkerud	Hoonigan Racing Division	Ford Focus RS	17th	2nd	2nd	1st	15
3	1	(Norway) Petter Solberg	Petter Solberg World RX Team	Citroën DS3	19th	5th	1st	3rd	14
4	9	(France) Sébastien Loeb	Team Peugeot-Hansen	Peugeot 208	1st	18th	3rd	14th	13
5	5	(Sweden) Mattias Ekström	EKS RX	Audi S1	18th	7th	5th	2nd	12
6	4	(Sweden) Robin Larsson	Larsson Jernberg Motorsport	Audi A1	15th	4th	6th	6th	11
7	57	(Finland) Toomas Heikkinen	EKS RX	Audi S1	4th	3rd	12th	10th	10
8	6	(Latvia) Jānis Baumanis	World RX Team Austria	Ford Fiesta	4th	11th	9th	8th	9
9	21	(Sweden) Timmy Hansen	Team Peugeot-Hansen	Peugeot 208	13th	8th	7th	5th	8
10	68	(Finland) Niclas Grönholm	Olsbergs MSE	Ford Fiesta ST	3rd	14th	10th	9th	7
11	17	(France) Davy Jeanney	Peugeot Hansen Academy	Peugeot 208	8th	19th	8th	7th	6
12	92	(Sweden) Anton Marklund	Volkswagen RX Sweden	Volkswagen Polo	6th	12th	11th	13th	5
13	43	(United States) Ken Block	Hoonigan Racing Division	Ford Focus RS	11th	13th	14th	12th	4
14	7	(Russia) Timur Timerzyanov	World RX Team Austria	Ford Fiesta	10th	10th	18th	11th	3
15	96	(Sweden) Kevin Eriksson	Olsbergs MSE	Ford Fiesta ST	5th	15th	16th	15th	2
16	33	(United Kingdom) Liam Doran	JRM Racing	BMW MINI Countryman	12th	9th	15th	18th	1
17	23	(Sweden) Richard Göransson	Olsbergs MSE	Ford Fiesta ST	9th	16th	13th	17th	
18	15	(Latvia) Reinis Nitišs	All-Inkl.com Münnich Motorsport	SEAT Ibiza	16th	6th	19th	19th	
19	55	(Germany) René Münnich	All-Inkl.com Münnich Motorsport	SEAT Ibiza	14th	17th	17th	16th	

=== Semi-finals ===
Semi-final 1

Pos.	No.	Driver	Team	Time	Pts
1	21	(Sweden) Timmy Hansen	Team Peugeot-Hansen	4:44.143	6
2	3	(Sweden) Johan Kristoffersson	Volkswagen RX Sweden	+0.565	5
3	5	(Sweden) Mattias Ekström	EKS RX	+1.157	4
4	1	(Norway) Petter Solberg	Petter Solberg World RX Team	+1.903	3
5	57	(Finland) Toomas Heikkinen	EKS RX	+3.358	2
6	17	(France) Davy Jeanney	Peugeot Hansen Academy	+8.784	1

Semi-final 2

Pos.	No.	Driver	Team	Time	Pts
1	13	(Norway) Andreas Bakkerud	Hoonigan Racing Division	4:41.313	6
2	9	(France) Sébastien Loeb	Team Peugeot-Hansen	+1.035	5
3	92	(Sweden) Anton Marklund	Volkswagen RX Sweden	+3.299	4
4	6	(Latvia) Jānis Baumanis	World RX Team Austria	+5.440	3
5	68	(Finland) Niclas Grönholm	Olsbergs MSE	+6.498	2
6	4	(Sweden) Robin Larsson	Larsson Jernberg Motorsport	+10.779	1

=== Final ===
Pos.	No.	Driver	Team	Time	Pts
1	13	(Norway) Andreas Bakkerud	Hoonigan Racing Division	4:40.614	8
2	9	(France) Sébastien Loeb	Team Peugeot-Hansen	+3.128	5
3	21	(Sweden) Timmy Hansen	Team Peugeot-Hansen	+4.153	4
4	92	(Sweden) Anton Marklund	Volkswagen RX Sweden	+5.644	3
5	3	(Sweden) Johan Kristoffersson	Volkswagen RX Sweden	+11.424	2
6	5	(Sweden) Mattias Ekström	EKS RX	DNF	1

== RX Lites ==
=== Heats ===
Pos.	No.	Driver	Team	Q1	Q2	Q3	Q4	Pts
1	16	(Norway) Thomas Bryntesson	JC Raceteknik	1st	14th	7th	1st	16
2	13	(France) Cyril Raymond	Olsbergs MSE	11th	1st	2nd	5th	15
3	52	(Sweden) Simon Olofsson	Simon Olofsson	5th	3rd	3rd	8th	14
4	21	(Sweden) Marcus Höglund	Olsbergs MSE	6th	9th	5th	4th	13
5	99	(Norway) Joachim Hvaal	JC Raceteknik	3rd	5th	8th	9th	12
6	6	(Sweden) William Nilsson	JC Raceteknik	15th	2nd	6th	7th	11
7	56	(Norway) Thomas Holmen	Thomas Holmen	2nd	17th	10th	3rd	10
8	2	(Sweden) Johan Larsson	Johan Larsson	7th	7th	4th	13th	9
9	8	(Norway) Simon Wågø Syversen	Set Promotion	8th	11th	1st	17th	8
10	3	(Sweden) Per Björnson	JC Raceteknik	14th	8th	11th	2nd	7
11	47	(Sweden) Alexander Westlund	Alexander Westlund	9th	4th	9th	11th	6
12	14	(Sweden) Magnus Hansen	JC Raceteknik	4th	10th	14th	12th	5
13	69	(Norway) Sondre Evjen	JC Raceteknik	12th	12th	15th	6th	4
14	86	(Sweden) Santosh Berggren	Santosh Berggren	13th	16th	12th	10th	3
15	91	(Sweden) Jonathan Walfridsson	Helmia Motorsport	16th	6th	17th	15th	2
16	33	(Kenya) Tejas Hirani	Olsbergs MSE	10th	13th	16th	16th	1
17	66	(Andorra) Albert Llovera	Albert Llovera	17th	15th	13th	14th	

=== Semi-finals ===
Semi-final 1

Pos.	No.	Driver	Team	Time	Pts
1	16	(Norway) Thomas Bryntesson	JC Raceteknik	5:15.339	6
2	52	(Sweden) Simon Olofsson	Simon Olofsson	+1.160	5
3	47	(Sweden) Alexander Westlund	Alexander Westlund	+34.457	4
4	99	(Norway) Joachim Hvaal	JC Raceteknik	+45.831	3
5	56	(Norway) Thomas Holmen	Thomas Holmen	DNF	2
6	8	(Norway) Simon Wågø Syversen	SET Promotion	DNF	1

Semi-final 2

Pos.	No.	Driver	Team	Time	Pts
1	13	(France) Cyril Raymond	Olsbergs MSE	5:20.849	6
2	21	(Sweden) Marcus Höglund	Olsbergs MSE	+0.158	5
3	2	(Sweden) Johan Larsson	Johan Larsson	+1.028	4
4	3	(Sweden) Per Björnson	JC Raceteknik	+1.674	3
5	6	(Sweden) William Nilsson	JC Raceteknik	+2.422	2
6	14	(Sweden) Magnus Hansen	JC Raceteknik	+4.142	1

=== Final ===
Pos.	No.	Driver	Team	Time	Pts
1	52	(Sweden) Simon Olofsson	Simon Olofsson	5:02.813	8
2	13	(France) Cyril Raymond	Olsbergs MSE	+0.861	5
3	2	(Sweden) Johan Larsson	Johan Larsson	+2.707	4
4	16	(Norway) Thomas Bryntesson	JC Raceteknik	+4.235	3
5	47	(Sweden) Alexander Westlund	Alexander Westlund	+6.269	2
6	21	(Sweden) Marcus Höglund	Olsbergs MSE	+26.699	1

== Standings after the event ==
Supercar standings

Pos	Pilot	Pts	Gap
1	(Sweden) Mattias Ekström	142	
2	(Norway) Petter Solberg	137	+3
3	(Norway) Andreas Bakkerud	110	+32
4	(France) Sébastien Loeb	106	+36
4	(Sweden) Johan Kristoffersson	106	+36

RX Lites standings

Pos	Driver	Pts	Gap
1	(France) Cyril Raymond	128	
2	(Norway) Thomas Bryntesson	126	+2
3	(Sweden) Simon Olofsson	109	+19
4	(Norway) Joachim Hvaal	97	+31
5	(Norway) Simon Wågø Syversen	80	+48

- Note: Only the top five positions are included.

Previous race: 2016 World RX of Norway	FIA World Rallycross Championship; 2016 season	Next race: 2016 World RX of Canada
Previous race: 2015 World RX of Sweden	World RX of Sweden	Next race: 2017 World RX of Sweden
