= Rice burner =

Pejorative term for a car with excessive cosmetic additions

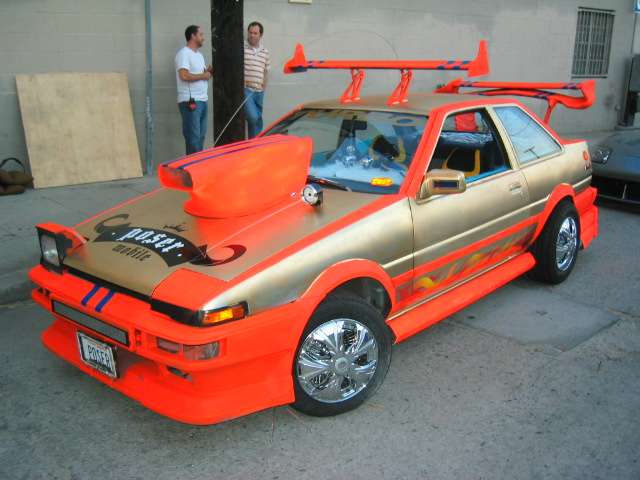
T-Mobile's 1985 Corolla Sport GT-S coupé "Poser Mobile" advertisements exploited ethnic stereotypes and stereotypes of customized East Asian cars as failed imitations of "authentic" car culture.

Rice burner is a pejorative term originally applied to Japanese motorcycles and which later expanded to include Japanese cars or any East Asian-made vehicles. Variations include rice rocket, referring most often to Japanese superbikes, rice machine, rice grinder or simply ricer.

Riced out is an adjective denigrating a (possibly badly) customized sports car, "usually with oversized or ill-matched exterior appointments". Rice boy is a US derogatory term for the driver or builder of an import-car hot rod. The terms may disparage cars or car enthusiasts as imposters or wanna-bes, using cheap modifications to imitate the appearance of high performance.

The term has been defined as offensive or racist stereotyping. In some cases, users of the term assert that it is not offensive or racist, or else treat the term as a humorous, mild insult rather than a racial slur.

Nowadays, the term has potentially become lexicalized, referring more to the non-automobile-specific concept of having a high-performance exterior, and lacking the pejorative connotations.

== Early usage 1917 to 1930s ==
Examples of "rice burner" used literally, meaning one who burns rice or rice fields, as in stubble burning, date to 1917. In 1935 it appeared in a US newspaper caption with a racial connotation, disparaging East Asian people.

== Korean War early 1950s ==
Canadian troops in the Korean War initially referred to the Korean labor and support unit providing their food, water, ammunition and other supplies as "G Company", which was code for the racist slur gook. They quickly became known instead as "rice burners", due to the Canadians' admiration for their Korean support unit's demonstrated strength and stamina in carrying 55 lb (25 kg) loads over rough terrain, sometimes in snow and ice. While dehumanizing the Koreans as machines that ran on rice was a form of contempt, it was condescendingly approved by the men serving at the time as an improvement over the word it replaced. Comparably, Alaskan slang for a sled dog is "fish burner", as in a beast of burden that runs on fish.

== UK 1960s ==
"Rice-burner" appeared in the British motorcycling magazine The Motor Cycle in 1966 as a generally disparaging term for Japanese motorcycles.

== US 1970s ==
By the 1970s, rice burner was a US English slang term for the Vietnamese people during and after the Vietnam War. It was used in the US by "Detroit loyalists" to disparage more economical Japanese competitors of the US car industry during the 1970s energy crisis.

== UK 1980s ==
"The Rice Burner" was a turbocharged Kawasaki Z1000-engined drag-bike, built and raced by North Coventry Kawasaki, a retail motorcycle business in Coventry, England, specializing in turbocharged conversion kits for street and competition machines procured from Jack O'Malley, of Orient Express, New York.

== Poser stereotype ==
T-Mobile's 2005 "Poser Mobile" parody advertisements created a stereotypical caricature "rice burner" or "boy racer" car as perceived by critics of the import scene, along with such cars' drivers, whose appearance and behavior is comically aspirational and "phony", contrasted with people whose clothing, speech, and cars are more "authentic". The video, online and point-of-purchase display ad campaign, created by the Publicis agency's Seattle office, was about the "Poser Mobile Posse", including "Big Spenda Lopez", "The Fee Jones", "25 cent Chang" who are weak imitations of both real hip hop performers and a "real" mobile phone provider.

== See also ==
- Ah Beng (Singapore/Malaysia)
- Antonym: sleeper
- Boy racer (UK term)
- Car tuning
- Hoon
- Import scene
- Street racing
