= Evo Street Racers =

- Sport: Motorsports
- Jurisdiction: United States
- Abbreviation: Evo
- Founded: 2003
- Headquarters: Long Beach, CA
- President: Bryan Harrison

Evo Street Racers (commonly referred to as “Evo”) is a motorsports organization that assists in the evolution of illegal street racers into motorsports racers.

== History ==
The organization was founded in 2003. Evo has worked to create a comprehensive unified action plan. Evo has been mentioned by media outlets including Good Morning America, National Public Radio (NPR), ESPN, and CNN.
