= List of World Rallycross Championship events =

The list of World Rallycross Championship events includes all World Championship rallycross events that was part of the World Rallycross Championship schedule from the series' inception in 2014 until 2025.

== Active and past events ==
Key
✔	Current events (for the 2025 season)

=== By event ===
Information below is correct up to and including the 2025 World RX of Turkey.

Event	Country	Current circuit	No of events	Seasons included	Image
World RX of Abu Dhabi	United Arab Emirates	Yas Marina Circuit	1	2019	
World RX of Argentina	Argentina	Autódromo Rosendo Hernández	1	2014	
World RX of Argentina	Argentina	Autódromo Municipal Juan Manuel Fangio	2	2015–2016	
World RX of Belgium	Belgium	Circuit Jules Tacheny Mettet	5	2014–2018	
World RX of Benelux	Belgium	Circuit de Spa-Francorchamps	4 (Note: The 2022 World RX of Benelux was a double header event.)	2019, 2021–2022	
World RX of Benelux	Belgium	Circuit Jules Tacheny Mettet	2 (Note: The 2024 World RX of Benelux was a double header event.)	2024	
World RX of Canada	Canada	Circuit Trois-Rivières	6	2014–2019	
World RX of Catalunya	Spain	Circuit de Barcelona-Catalunya	10 (Note: The 2021 World RX of Barcelona and the 2022 World RX of Barcelona were double header events.)	2015–2022	
World RX of Finland ✔	Finland	Tykkimäki	4 (Note: The 2020 World RX of Finland was a double header event.)	2014, 2020	
World RX of Finland ✔	Finland	Kymi Ring ✔	1	2025	
World RX of France	France	Circuit de Lohéac	7	2014–2019, 2021	
World RX of Germany	Germany	Estering	5	2014–2018	
World RX of Germany	Germany	Nürburgring	3 (Note: The 2021 World RX of Germany was a double header event.)	2021–2022	
World RX of Great Britain	Great Britain	Lydden Hill Race Circuit	4	2014–2017	
World RX of Great Britain	Great Britain	Silverstone Circuit	2	2018–2019	
World RX of Hockenheim	Germany	Hockenheimring	3	2015–2017	
World RX of Hong Kong, China	Hong Kong	Hong Kong Central Harbourfront Circuit	2 (Note: The 2023 World RX of Hong Kong, China was a double header event.)	2023	
World RX of Hungary ✔	Hungary	Nyirád Racing Center ✔	3 (Note: The 2024 World RX of Hungary was a double header event.)	2024–2025	
World RX of Latvia	Latvia	Biķernieku Kompleksā Sporta Bāze	10 (Note: The 2020, 2021, and 2022 World RX of Latvia were double header events.)	2016–2022	
World RX of Norway	Norway	Lånkebanen	8	2014–2019, 2022–2023	
World RX of Portugal ✔	Portugal	Pista Automóvel de Montalegre	11 (Note: The 2022 World RX of Portugal and 2024 World RX of Portugal were double header events.)	2014–2018, 2021–2024	
World RX of Portugal ✔	Portugal	Eurocircuito da Costilha ✔	1	2025	
World RX of South Africa	South Africa	Killarney Motor Racing Complex	3 (Note: The 2023 World RX of South Africa was a double header event.)	2017-2019, 2023	
World RX of Sweden ✔	Sweden	Höljesbanan ✔	12 (Note: The 2024 World RX of Sweden was a double header event.)	2014–2021, 2023–2025	
World RX of Turkey ✔	Turkey	Istanbul Park ✔	6 (Note: The 2024 World RX of Turkey and 2025 World RX of Turkey were double header events.)	2014–2015, 2024–2025	
World RX of the United States	United States	Circuit of the Americas	1	2018	

=== Timeline ===
2014	2015	2016	2017	2018	2019	2020	2021	2022	2023	2024	2025
					Abu Dhabi	(Note: Originally scheduled to be part of Championship, was later cancelled due to COVID-19 pandemic.)					
Argentina											
Belgium											
					Benelux		Benelux			Benelux	
Canada											
	Catalunya										
									Hong Kong		
Finland						Finland					Finland
France							France				
Germany							Germany				
Great Britain											
	Hockenheim										
										Hungary	
Italy											
		Latvia									
Norway								Norway			
Portugal							Portugal				
			South Africa						South Africa		
Sweden								(Note: Originally scheduled to be part of Championship, was later cancelled for RX1e.)	Sweden		
Turkey										Turkey	
				United States							

== Events by season ==
=== 2014–2025 ===
Rnd	2014	2015	2016	2017	2018	2019	2020	2021	2022	2023	2024	2025
1	Portugal	Portugal	Portugal	(Spain) Barcelona	(Spain) Barcelona	(United Arab Emirates) Abu Dhabi	Sweden	(Spain) Catalunya	Norway	Portugal	Sweden	Portugal
2	(United Kingdom) Great Britain	(Germany) Hockenheim	(Germany) Hockenheim	Portugal	Portugal	(Spain) Catalunya	Sweden	Sweden	Latvia	Norway	Sweden	Sweden
3	Norway	Belgium	Belgium	(Germany) Hockenheim	Belgium	(Belgium) Benelux	Finland	France	Latvia	Sweden	Hungary	Hungary
4	Finland	(United Kingdom) Great Britain	(United Kingdom) Great Britain	Belgium	(United Kingdom) Great Britain	(United Kingdom) Great Britain	Finland	Latvia	Portugal	South Africa	Hungary	Finland
5	Sweden	Germany	Norway	(United Kingdom) Great Britain	Norway	Norway	Latvia	Latvia	Portugal	South Africa	(Belgium) Benelux	Turkey
6	Belgium	Sweden	Sweden	Norway	Sweden	Sweden	Latvia	(Belgium) Benelux	(Belgium) Benelux	Hong Kong	(Belgium) Benelux	Turkey
7	Canada	Canada	Canada	Sweden	Canada	Canada	(Spain) Catalunya	Portugal	(Belgium) Benelux	Hong Kong	Portugal	
8	France	Norway	France	Canada	France	France	(Spain) Catalunya	Germany	(Spain) Catalunya		Portugal	
9	Germany	France	(Spain) Barcelona	France	Latvia	Latvia		Germany	(Spain) Catalunya		Turkey	
10	Italy	(Spain) Barcelona	Latvia	Latvia	United States	South Africa			Germany		Turkey	
11	Turkey	Turkey	Germany	Germany	Germany							
12	Argentina	Italy	Argentina	South Africa	South Africa							
13		Argentina										
