= 2019 FIA World Rallycross Championship =

Auto racing championship

The 2019 FIA World Rallycross Championship presented by Monster Energy was the sixth season of the FIA World Rallycross Championship, an auto racing championship recognised by the Fédération Internationale de l'Automobile (FIA) as the highest class of international rallycross.

Timmy Hansen won the Drivers' Championship on countback after finishing with the same number of points as Andreas Bakkerud, winning based on his four event wins to Bakkerud's one. Team Hansen MJP won the Teams' Championship.

== Calendar ==
The 2019 championship was contested over ten rounds in Europe, Africa, the Middle East and North America.

The following events are scheduled to take place as part of the 2019 championship:

Rnd.	Event	Dates	Venue	Class	Winner	Team	Report
1	(United Arab Emirates) World RX of Abu Dhabi	5–6 April	Yas Marina Circuit, Abu Dhabi	Supercar	(Sweden) Kevin Hansen	(Sweden) Team Hansen MJP	Report
2	(Spain) Cooper Tires World RX of Catalunya	27–28 April	Circuit de Barcelona-Catalunya, Montmeló	Supercar	(Sweden) Timmy Hansen	(Sweden) Team Hansen MJP	Report
2	(Spain) Cooper Tires World RX of Catalunya	27–28 April	Circuit de Barcelona-Catalunya, Montmeló	RX2	(Sweden) Oliver Eriksson	(Sweden) Olsbergs MSE	Report
3	(Belgium) Spa World RX of Benelux	11–12 May	Circuit de Spa-Francorchamps, Spa-Francorchamps	Supercar	(Russia) Timur Timerzyanov	(Finland) GRX Taneco Team	Report
3	(Belgium) Spa World RX of Benelux	11–12 May	Circuit de Spa-Francorchamps, Spa-Francorchamps	RX2	(Sweden) Oliver Eriksson	(Sweden) Olsbergs MSE	Report
4	(United Kingdom) Dayinsure World RX of Great Britain	25–26 May	Silverstone Circuit, Silverstone	Supercar	(Sweden) Timmy Hansen	(Sweden) Team Hansen MJP	Report
4	(United Kingdom) Dayinsure World RX of Great Britain	25–26 May	Silverstone Circuit, Silverstone	RX2	(Sweden) Oliver Eriksson	(Sweden) Olsbergs MSE	Report
5	Team Verksted World RX of Norway	15–16 June	Lånkebanen, Hell	Supercar	(Finland) Niclas Grönholm	(Finland) GRX Taneco Team	Report
5	Team Verksted World RX of Norway	15–16 June	Lånkebanen, Hell	RX2	(Sweden) Oliver Eriksson	(Sweden) Olsbergs MSE	Report
6	Swecon World RX of Sweden	6–7 July	Höljesbanan, Höljes	Supercar	(Sweden) Sebastian Eriksson	(Sweden) Olsbergs MSE	Report
6	Swecon World RX of Sweden	6–7 July	Höljesbanan, Höljes	RX2	(Norway) Ben-Philip Gundersen	(Sweden) JC Raceteknik	Report
7	World RX of Canada	3–4 August	Circuit Trois-Rivières, Trois-Rivières	Supercar	(Norway) Andreas Bakkerud	(United Kingdom) Monster Energy RX Cartel	Report
8	Bretagne World RX of France	31 August–1 September	Circuit de Lohéac, Lohéac	Supercar	(Sweden) Timmy Hansen	(Sweden) Team Hansen MJP	Report
8	Bretagne World RX of France	31 August–1 September	Circuit de Lohéac, Lohéac	RX2	(Norway) Ben-Philip Gundersen	(Sweden) JC Raceteknik	Report
9	Neste World RX of Latvia	14–15 September	Biķernieku Kompleksā Sporta Bāze, Riga	Supercar	(Sweden) Timmy Hansen	(Sweden) Team Hansen MJP	Report
10	Sabat World RX of South Africa	9–10 November	Killarney Motor Racing Complex, Cape Town	Supercar	(Finland) Niclas Grönholm	(Finland) GRX Taneco Team	Report
10	Sabat World RX of South Africa	9–10 November	Killarney Motor Racing Complex, Cape Town	RX2	(Sweden) Oliver Eriksson	(Sweden) Olsbergs MSE	Report

=== Calendar changes ===
- The calendar was trimmed from twelve rounds to ten with the removal of the World RX of Portugal, World RX of the United States and the World RX of Germany from the schedule.
- A new round, the World RX of Abu Dhabi, was added as the opening round of the championship.
- The World RX of Belgium moved from Circuit Jules Tacheny Mettet to Circuit de Spa-Francorchamps.
- The World RX of Canada will be a joint event with the Americas Rallycross Championship for the second consecutive time, and it is also the only combined round on the schedule.

== Entries ==
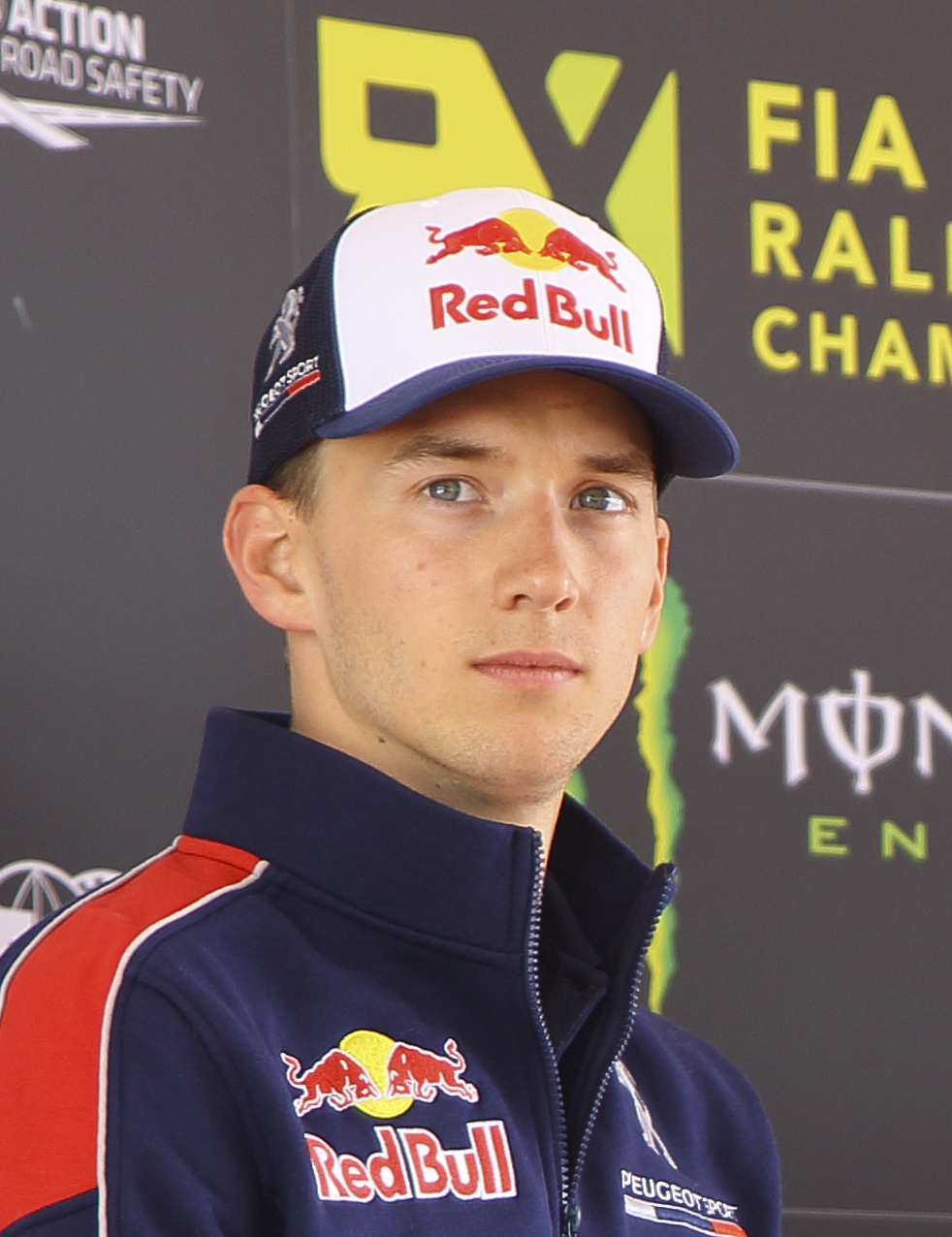
Timmy Hansen won the Drivers' Championship for the first time

=== Supercar ===
Constructor	Entrant	Car	No.	Drivers	Rounds
Audi	(Hungary) Kárai Motorsport Egyesület	Audi A1	73	(Hungary) Tamás Kárai	2
Audi	(United Kingdom) Monster Energy RX Cartel	Audi S1	13	(Norway) Andreas Bakkerud	All
Audi	(United Kingdom) Monster Energy RX Cartel	Audi S1	33	(United Kingdom) Liam Doran	All
Audi	(Sweden) Team JC Raceteknik	Audi S1	39	(Belgium) Enzo Ide	3
Audi	(Sweden) Team JC Raceteknik	Audi S1	4	(Sweden) Robin Larsson	9
Audi	(Sweden) EKS Audi Sport	Audi S1	40	(Sweden) Mattias Ekström	3
Audi	(Slovakia) EKS Sport	Audi S1	123	(Hungary) Krisztián Szabó	All
Citroën	(France) "Knapick"	Citroën DS3	84	(France) Hervé "Knapick" Lemonnier	2–4, 8
Ford	(United Kingdom) Christopher Hoy	Ford Fiesta MK7	41	(United Kingdom) Christopher Hoy	2
Ford	(Austria) Team STARD	Ford Fiesta MK7	5	(Norway) Pål Try	1, 3
Ford	(Austria) Team STARD	Ford Fiesta MK7	3	(Finland) Jani Paasonen	2
Ford	(Austria) Team STARD	Ford Fiesta MK8	3	(Finland) Jani Paasonen	4–5, 7–8
Ford	(Austria) Team STARD	Ford Fiesta MK8	22	(Finland) Jere Kalliokoski	6, 10
Ford	(Austria) Team STARD	Ford Fiesta MK8	5	(Norway) Pål Try	9
Ford	(Austria) Team STARD	Ford Fiesta MK8	6	(Latvia) Jānis Baumanis	All
Ford	(Sweden) Olsbergs MSE	Ford Fiesta MK8	93	(Sweden) Sebastian Eriksson	6
Ford	(Sweden) Olsbergs MSE	Ford Fiesta MK8	196	(Sweden) Kevin Eriksson	6
Honda	(Sweden) Olsbergs MSE	Honda Civic Coupé	72	(Denmark) Ulrik Linnemann	6
Hyundai	(Finland) GRX Taneco Team	Hyundai i20	7	(Russia) Timur Timerzyanov	All
Hyundai	(Finland) GRX Taneco Team	Hyundai i20	31	(Finland) Joni Wiman	3–4
Hyundai	(Finland) GRX Taneco Team	Hyundai i20	68	(Finland) Niclas Grönholm	1–2, 5–10
Hyundai	(Finland) GRX Set	Hyundai i20	15	(Latvia) Reinis Nitišs	1, 6, 9
Hyundai	(Finland) GRX Set	Hyundai i20	57	(Finland) Toomas Heikkinen	8
Mini	(United Kingdom) Xite Racing	Mini Cooper	42	(United Kingdom) Oliver Bennett	All
Peugeot	(Sweden) Team Hansen MJP	Peugeot 208	21	(Sweden) Timmy Hansen	All
Peugeot	(Sweden) Team Hansen MJP	Peugeot 208	71	(Sweden) Kevin Hansen	All
Peugeot	(Belgium) Grégoire Demoustier	Peugeot 208	66	(Belgium) Grégoire Demoustier	3
Peugeot	(United Kingdom) Mark Higgins	Peugeot 208	134	(United Kingdom) Mark Higgins	4
Peugeot	(France) Jonathan Pailler	Peugeot 208	18	(France) Jonathan Pailler	6, 8
Peugeot	(France) Fabien Pailler	Peugeot 208	20	(France) Fabien Pailler	6, 8
Renault	(France) GC Kompetition	Renault Mégane R.S.	14	(Lithuania) Rokas Baciuška	7-9
Renault	(France) GC Kompetition	Renault Mégane R.S.	36	(France) Guerlain Chicherit	All
Renault	(France) GC Kompetition	Renault Mégane R.S.	92	(Sweden) Anton Marklund	All
Renault	(France) GCK Academy	Renault Clio R.S.	96	(Belgium) Guillaume De Ridder	All
Renault	(France) GCK Academy	Renault Clio R.S.	113	(France) Cyril Raymond	All
Renault	(France) GCK Academy	Renault Mégane R.S.	14	(Lithuania) Rokas Baciuška	5–6
SEAT	(Germany) All-Inkl.com Münnich Motorsport	SEAT Ibiza	44	(Germany) Timo Scheider	All
Škoda	(Lithuania) ES Motorsport-Labas GAS	Škoda Fabia	14	(Lithuania) Rokas Baciuška	1–2
Škoda	(Lithuania) ES Motorsport-Labas GAS	Škoda Fabia	24	(Netherlands) Kevin Abbring	5–6
Škoda	(Lithuania) ES Motorsport-Labas GAS	Škoda Fabia	67	(Belgium) François Duval	3
Škoda	(Lithuania) ES Motorsport-Labas GAS	Škoda Fabia	12	(Russia) Matvey Furazhkin	8-10
Volkswagen	(Sweden) Hedströms Motorsport	Volkswagen Polo	64	(Norway) Kjetil Larsen	6
Volkswagen	(Sweden) Bridgestone Motorsport	Volkswagen Polo	95	(Sweden) Philip Gehrman	6

=== RX2 ===
Constructor	Entrant	Car	No.	Drivers	Rounds
OMSE	(Sweden) JC Raceteknik	Olsbergs MSE RX2	2	(Norway) Ben-Philip Gundersen	All
OMSE	(Sweden) JC Raceteknik	Olsbergs MSE RX2	6	(Sweden) William Nilsson	1-3
OMSE	(Sweden) JC Raceteknik	Olsbergs MSE RX2	90	(Sweden) Jimmie Walfridson	1–2, 4-5
OMSE	(Sweden) JC Raceteknik	Olsbergs MSE RX2	54	(Sweden) Petter Nårsa	6-7
OMSE	(Norway) Morten Asklund	Olsbergs MSE RX2	11	(Norway) Morten Asklund	4-5
OMSE	(Sweden) Anders Michalak	Olsbergs MSE RX2	12	(Sweden) Anders Michalak	All
OMSE	(Sweden) Olsbergs MSE	Olsbergs MSE RX2	16	(Sweden) Oliver Eriksson	All
OMSE	(Sweden) Olsbergs MSE	Olsbergs MSE RX2	18	(Sweden) Linus Östlund	5, 7
OMSE	(Sweden) Olsbergs MSE	Olsbergs MSE RX2	35	(Jamaica) Fraser McConnell	All
OMSE	(Sweden) Olsbergs MSE	Olsbergs MSE RX2	47	(Finland) Jesse Kallio	All
OMSE	(Sweden) Olsbergs MSE	Olsbergs MSE RX2	91	(Sweden) Niklas Aneklev	7
OMSE	(Sweden) Team Färén	Olsbergs MSE RX2	21	(France) Damien Meunier	1–2, 6
OMSE	(Sweden) Team Färén	Olsbergs MSE RX2	99	(Sweden) Marcus Höglund	4-5
OMSE	(Sweden) Team Färén	Olsbergs MSE RX2	6	(Sweden) William Nilsson	6
OMSE	(Sweden) Team Färén	Olsbergs MSE RX2	31	(France) Yann Le Jossec	6
OMSE	(Finland) Set Promotion	Olsbergs MSE RX2	22	(Finland) Sami-Matti Trogen	All
OMSE	(Finland) Set Promotion	Olsbergs MSE RX2	65	(Finland) Jami Kalliomäki	5
OMSE	(Norway) Petter Leirhol	Olsbergs MSE RX2	27	(Norway) Petter Leirhol	4-5
OMSE	(Norway) Lars Erik Haug	Olsbergs MSE RX2	33	(Norway) Lars Erik Haug	5
OMSE	(Sweden) Simon Olofsson	Olsbergs MSE RX2	52	(Sweden) Simon Olofsson	All
OMSE	(Latvia) Sport Racing Technologies	Olsbergs MSE RX2	55	(Latvia) Vasiliy Gryazin	All
OMSE	(Latvia) Sport Racing Technologies	Olsbergs MSE RX2	69	(Russia) Nikolay Gryazin	6
OMSE	(Sweden) Martin Enlund	Olsbergs MSE RX2	60	(Sweden) Martin Enlund	5
OMSE	(Andorra) Albert Llovera	Olsbergs MSE RX2	66	(Andorra) Albert Llovera	1-6
OMSE	(Belgium) Steve Volders	Olsbergs MSE RX2	77	(Belgium) Steve Volders	All
OMSE	(Norway) Stein Fredric Akre	Olsbergs MSE RX2	98	(Norway) Stein Fredric Akre	5
OMSE	(Sweden) William Nilsson	Olsbergs MSE RX2	6	(Sweden) William Nilsson	5
OMSE	(Sweden) Mats Oskarsson	Olsbergs MSE RX2	111	(Sweden) Mats Oskarsson	5
OMSE	(United States) Iane Vacala	Olsbergs MSE RX2	50	(United States) Iane Vacala	6-7

=== Team changes ===
- Team Peugeot Total and PSRX Volkswagen Sweden all withdrew from the championship after the 2018 season.
- Monster Energy RX Cartel joined the championship, fielding two Audi S1s.
- GC Kompetition will run a second team, GCK Academy, comprising two Renault Clios.
- EKS Sport lost its factory backing from Audi and reduced from two cars to one.
- ES Motorsport-Labas GAS entered the championship running a single Škoda Fabia.

=== Driver changes ===
- Following the withdrawal of their respective teams, reigning World Champion Johan Kristoffersson, Petter Solberg, Sébastien Loeb and Robin Larsson all left the Championship.
- Andreas Bakkerud and Liam Doran left EKS Audi Sport and GC Kompetition respectively to join Monster Energy RX Cartel.
- Guillaume De Ridder and Cyril Raymond moved up from RX2 and ERX respectively with GCK Academy.
- Krisztián Szabó moved up from ERX with EKS Sport.
- 2018 European Rallycross Super1600 champion, Rokas Baciuška, joined the championship with ES Motorsport-Labas GAS but he was forced to cut relationship with the team so he only did do the two first rounds of the season.

== Results and standings ==
World Championship points are scored as follows:

	Position															
Round	1st	2nd	3rd	4th	5th	6th	7th	8th	9th	10th	11th	12th	13th	14th	15th	16th
Heats	16	15	14	13	12	11	10	9	8	7	6	5	4	3	2	1
Semi-Finals	6	5	4	3	2	1										
Final	8	5	4	3	2	1										

- A red background denotes drivers who did not advance from the round

=== FIA World Rallycross Championship for Drivers ===
Pos.	Driver	ABU (United Arab Emirates)	BAR (Spain)	BEL (Belgium)	GBR (United Kingdom)	NOR (Norway)	SWE (Sweden)	CAN (Canada)	FRA (France)	LAT (Latvia)	RSA (South Africa)	Points
1	(Sweden) Timmy Hansen	13	1	4	1	6	6	13	1	1	4	211
2	(Norway) Andreas Bakkerud	15	3	2	2	8	7	1	5	3	2	211
3	(Sweden) Kevin Hansen	1	2	8	7	2	2	6	3	4	5	199
4	(Finland) Niclas Grönholm	2	4			1	5	7	6	2	1	186
5	(Russia) Timur Timerzyanov	8	7	1	11	7	24	3	12	5	3	142
6	(Latvia) Jānis Baumanis	5	6	5	10	3	10	2	10	12	8	137
7	(Sweden) Anton Marklund	7	14	7	3	DSQ	8	5	2	9	11	119
8	(United Kingdom) Liam Doran	3	10	6	6	5	15	8	9	6	16^{a}	114
9	(Germany) Timo Scheider	6	12	9	4	9	23	10	8	11	6	109
10	(Hungary) Krisztián Szabó	4	8	11	5	12	17	12	11	10	9	91
11	(Lithuania) Rokas Baciuška	9	13			16	9	9	4	7		76
12	(France) Guerlain Chicherit	10	9	13	9	11	14	4	13	15	7	73
13	(France) Cyril Raymond	12	5	12	13	10	20	11	15^{a}	13	15	45
14	(Latvia) Reinis Nitišs	13					3			8		40
15	(Finland) Joni Wiman			3	8							39
16	(Netherlands) Kevin Abbring					4	4					35
17	(Sweden) Sebastian Eriksson						1					29
18	(Belgium) Guillaume De Ridder	16	11	15	16	15	19	14	16	14	10	29
19	(Finland) Toomas Heikkinen								7			15
20	(United Kingdom) Oliver Bennett	17	17	14	12	14	22	15	19	16	12	12^{b}
21	(Finland) Jere Kalliokoski						12				14	10
22	(Finland) Jani Paasonen		16		14	13		16	17			9
23	(Sweden) Mattias Ekström			10								8
24	(Sweden) Kevin Eriksson						11					8
25	(Russia) Matvey Furazhkin								20	17	13	4
26	(France) Jonathan Pailler						13		18			4
27	(Norway) Pål Try	14		16						18		4
28	(France) Fabien Pailler						16		14			4
29	(United Kingdom) Mark Higgins				15							2
30	(United Kingdom) Christopher Hoy		15									2
31	(Belgium) François Duval			17								0
32	(Norway) Kjetil Larsen						18					0
33	(Belgium) Enzo Ide			18								0
34	(Sweden) Robin Larsson									19		0
35	(Belgium) Gregoire Demoustier			19								0
36	(Sweden) Philip Gehrman						21					0
37	(Denmark) Ulrik Linnemann						25					0
38	(Hungary) Tamás Kárai		18									0
39	(France) Hervé "Knapick"		19	20	17				21^{a}			-15
Pos.	Driver	ABU (United Arab Emirates)	BAR (Spain)	BEL (Belgium)	GBR (United Kingdom)	NOR (Norway)	SWE (Sweden)	CAN (Canada)	FRA (France)	LAT (Latvia)	RSA (South Africa)	Points

Colour	Result
Gold	Winner
Silver	Second place
Bronze	Third place
Green	Points classification
Blue	Non-points classification
Blue	Non-classified finish (NC)
Purple	Retired, not classified (Ret)
Red	Did not qualify (DNQ)
Red	Did not pre-qualify (DNPQ)
Black	Disqualified (DSQ)
White	Did not start (DNS)
White	Withdrew (WD)
White	Race cancelled (C)
Blank	Did not practice (DNP)
Blank	Did not arrive (DNA)
Blank	Excluded (EX)

^{a} Loss of 15 championship points – stewards' decision
^{b} Loss of 10 championship points – stewards' decision

=== FIA World Rallycross Championship for Teams ===
Pos.	Team	No.	Drivers	Points
1	(Sweden) Team Hansen MJP	21	(Sweden) Timmy Hansen	410
1	(Sweden) Team Hansen MJP	71	(Sweden) Kevin Hansen	410
2	(Finland) GRX Taneco Team	7	(Russia) Timur Timerzyanov	367
2	(Finland) GRX Taneco Team	31	(Finland) Joni Wiman	367
2	(Finland) GRX Taneco Team	68	(Finland) Niclas Grönholm	367
3	(United Kingdom) Monster Energy RX Cartel	13	(Norway) Andreas Bakkerud	325
3	(United Kingdom) Monster Energy RX Cartel	33	(United Kingdom) Liam Doran	325
4	(France) GC Kompetition	36	(France) Guerlain Chicherit	192
4	(France) GC Kompetition	92	(Sweden) Anton Marklund	192
5	(Austria) Team STARD^{1}	3	(Finland) Jani Paasonen	103
5	(Austria) Team STARD^{1}	5	(Norway) Pål Try	103
5	(Austria) Team STARD^{1}	6	(Latvia) Jānis Baumanis	103
5	(Austria) Team STARD^{1}	22	(Finland) Jere Kalliokoski	103
6	(France) GCK Academy	96	(Belgium) Guillaume De Ridder	74
6	(France) GCK Academy	113	(France) Cyril Raymond	74

^{1} – Team STARD ran two different specifications of car at rounds 1–3 and therefore were ineligible to score teams points at these events.

=== RX2 International Series Drivers' Championship ===
Pos.	Driver	BAR (Spain)	BEL (Belgium)	GBR (United Kingdom)	NOR (Norway)	SWE (Sweden)	FRA (France)	RSA (South Africa)	Points
1	(Sweden) Oliver Eriksson	1	1	1	1	11	2	1	193
2	(Norway) Ben-Philip Gundersen	13	3	5	2	1	1	6	150
3	(Finland) Jesse Kallio	3	2	2	3	3	6	13	146
4	(Jamaica) Fraser McConnell	2	5	7	6	5	4	2	143
5	(Finland) Sami-Matti Trogen	4	4	4	11	4	3	3	124
6	(Latvia) Vasiliy Gryazin	5	7	3	13	6	5	4	112
7	(Sweden) Simon Olofsson	8	8	10	7	10	13	8	68
8	(Sweden) Anders Michalak	7	9	6	10	13	11	7	64
9	(Belgium) Steven Volders	9	12	9	5	17	9	10	60
10	(Sweden) William Nilsson	10	6	8		12	8		57
11	(Sweden) Linus Östlund					2		5	41
12	(Sweden) Jimmie Walfridson	11	10		8	9			39
13	(France) Damien Meunier	6	11				10		32
14	(Andorra) Albert Llovera	12	13	11	14	21	14		23
15	(Sweden) Marcus Höglund				4	14			22
16	(Sweden) Petter Nårsa						12	9	20
17	(Latvia) Nikolay Gryazin						7		13
18	(Sweden) Martin Enlund					7			13
19	(Sweden) Mats Oskarsson					8			12
20	(Sweden) Niklas Aneklev							11	9
21	(Norway) Morten Asklund				9	19			8
22	(Norway) Petter Leirhol				12	18			8
23	(United States) Lane Vacala						15	12	2
24	(Finland) Jami Kalliomäki					15			2
25	(France) Yann Le Jossec						16		1
26	(Norway) Stein Fredric Akre					16			1
27	(Norway) Lars Erik Haug					20			0
Pos.	Driver	BAR (Spain)	BEL (Belgium)	GBR (United Kingdom)	NOR (Norway)	SWE (Sweden)	FRA (France)	RSA (South Africa)	Points
