= 2024 FIA World Rallycross Championship =

Auto racing championship

The 2024 FIA World Rallycross Championship was the eleventh season of the FIA World Rallycross Championship, an auto racing championship recognized by the Fédération Internationale de l'Automobile (FIA) as the highest class of international rallycross.

Johan Kristoffersson won the drivers' championship for the fifth consecutive year, his seventh title overall. Kristoffersson Motorsport are the reigning teams champions.

== Calendar ==
On the 28th of February 2024, the 2024 calendar was announced. It included a first ever World Rallycross round at an unannounced location in Australia. It was also announced that there were ongoing discussions to add an additional round in Asia. On the 12th of July 2024, it was announced that the planned season closer in Australia would not be going ahead. Instead it was announced that the season finale will be a double header event staged in China on the 19th and 20th of October 2024. On 7 October 2024 it was announced that the planned season ending round in China would not go ahead either, and would instead be replaced by a double header round in Turkey, at the Istanbul Park on the 9th and 10th of November 2024.

Rnd	Event	Date	Venue	Winning driver	Winning team	Report
1	World RX of Sweden	6–7 July	Höljesbanan, Höljes	(Sweden) Johan Kristoffersson	(Sweden) KMS - HORSE Powertrain	Report
2	World RX of Sweden	6–7 July	Höljesbanan, Höljes	(Sweden) Johan Kristoffersson	(Sweden) KMS - HORSE Powertrain	Report
3	World RX of Hungary	27–28 July	Nyirád Racing Center, Nyirád	(Finland) Niclas Grönholm	(Sweden) Construction Equipment Dealer Team	Report
4	World RX of Hungary	27–28 July	Nyirád Racing Center, Nyirád	(Sweden) Johan Kristoffersson	(Sweden) KMS - HORSE Powertrain	Report
5	(Belgium) World RX of Benelux	17–18 August	Circuit Jules Tacheny Mettet, Mettet	(Sweden) Timmy Hansen	(Sweden) Hansen World RX Team	Report
6	(Belgium) World RX of Benelux	17–18 August	Circuit Jules Tacheny Mettet, Mettet	(Sweden) Johan Kristoffersson	(Sweden) KMS - HORSE Powertrain	Report
7	World RX of Portugal	7–8 September	Pista Automóvel de Montalegre, Montalegre	(Sweden) Johan Kristoffersson	(Sweden) KMS - HORSE Powertrain	Report
8	World RX of Portugal	7–8 September	Pista Automóvel de Montalegre, Montalegre	(Sweden) Kevin Hansen	(Sweden) Hansen World RX Team	Report
9	World RX of Turkey	9–10 November	Istanbul Park, Istanbul	(Norway) Ole Christian Veiby	(Sweden) KMS - HORSE Powertrain	Report
10	World RX of Turkey	9–10 November	Istanbul Park, Istanbul	(Finland) Juha Rytkönen	(France) PGRX	Report

== Series News ==
- On 6 December 2023 it was announced that the championship would reintroduce internal combustion cars to compete in the highest class in the championship together with the electric RX1e cars that had been introduced in 2022, on the basis of the combustion vehicles being sustainably fueled. Internal combustion vehicles had been absent from the championship since they were retired after the 2021 season. A maximum of 16 full time entries will be allowed to take part in the season.
- The weekend format was adjusted for the 2024 season. SuperPole was replaced by pre-determined starting positions in all heats. The time-based format for the heats was scrapped in favor of races for position, and championship points will be awarded for every heat race, semi-final, and final.
- Cooper Tires left the championship as the official supplier of tires for all categories. They were replaced by Hoosier Racing Tires.

== Entries ==
=== RX1 ===
Constructor	Team	Type	Model	No.	Drivers	Rounds	Ref
Hyundai	(France) PGRX	ICE	Hyundai i20 RX	18	(Finland) Juha Rytkönen	9–10	
Hyundai	(France) PGRX	ICE	Hyundai i20 RX	22	(France) Steven Bossard	9–10	
Peugeot	(United Kingdom) Team RX Racing	ICE	Peugeot 208 RX	7	(Republic of Ireland) Patrick O'Donovan	9–10	
Peugeot	(Portugal) JDM Raptor Racing	ICE	Peugeot 208 RX	8	(France) Anthony Pelfrene	1–8	
Peugeot	(Sweden) Hansen World RX Team	EV	Peugeot 208 RX1e	21	(Sweden) Timmy Hansen	All	
Peugeot	(Sweden) Hansen World RX Team	EV	Peugeot 208 RX1e	71	(Sweden) Kevin Hansen	All	
PWR Racing	(Sweden) CE Dealer Team by Volvo Construction Equipment	EV	PWR RX1e	12	(Sweden) Klara Andersson	All	
PWR Racing	(Sweden) CE Dealer Team by Volvo Construction Equipment	EV	PWR RX1e	68	(Finland) Niclas Grönholm	All	
Renault	(Hungary) Impossible RX Team	ICE	Renault Mégane RS RX	94	(Hungary) Jankó Wieszt	3–4	
SEAT	(Germany) ALL-INKL.COM Münnich Motorsport	ICE	SEAT Ibiza RX	77	(Germany) René Münnich	1–8	
Volkswagen	(Sweden) KMS - HORSE Powertrain	ICE	Volkswagen Polo KMS 601 RX	1	(Sweden) Johan Kristoffersson	All	
Volkswagen	(Sweden) KMS - HORSE Powertrain	ICE	Volkswagen Polo KMS 601 RX	96	(Norway) Ole Christian Veiby	All	
Volkswagen	(Sweden) Kristoffersson Motorsport	EV	Volkswagen Polo RX1e	17	(Sweden) Gustav Bergström	1–2	
Volkswagen	(Sweden) Kristoffersson Motorsport	EV	Volkswagen Polo RX1e	69	(Norway) Sondre Evjen	1–2	

== Championship standings ==
Points are scored based on finishing position in every heat race, semi-final and final. Points are scored as follows:

Position	1st	2nd	3rd	4th	5th	6th
Heat race points	5	4	3	2	1	0
Finals points	10	8	6	4	2	1

=== World RX Driver's Championship ===
Pos.	Driver	SWE (Sweden)		HUN (Hungary)		BLX (Belgium)		PRT (Portugal)		TÜR (Turkey)		Points
1	(Sweden) Johan Kristoffersson	1	1	5	1	4	1	1	2	6	2	240 (Note: Johan Kristoffersson was penalized 5 championship points due to receiving three reprimands across the season.)
2	(Sweden) Kevin Hansen	6	4	6	5	3	2	3	1	3	4	197
3	(Norway) Ole Christian Veiby	5	3	2	2	2	3	4	5	1	6	190
4	(Sweden) Timmy Hansen	4	6	4	4	1	5	6	3	4	3	181
5	(Finland) Niclas Grönholm	7	2	1	9	7	4	2	6	2	5	177
6	(Sweden) Klara Andersson	2	8	9	3	5	6	8	4	7	8	145
7	(Germany) René Münnich	10	10	7	6	6	7	5	7			76
8	(France) Anthony Pelfrene	8	7	8	8	8	8	7	8			71
9	(Finland) Juha Rytkönen									8	1	36
10	(Sweden) Gustav Bergström	3	5									33
11	(Hungary) Jankó Wieszt			3	7							28
12	(Republic of Ireland) Patrick O'Donovan									5	7	27
13	(France) Steven Bossard									9	9	16
14	(Norway) Sondre Evjen	9	9									15
Pos.	Driver	SWE (Sweden)		HUN (Hungary)		BLX (Belgium)		PRT (Portugal)		TÜR (Turkey)		Points

Colour	Result
Gold	Winner
Silver	Second place
Bronze	Third place
Green	Points classification
Blue	Non-points classification
Blue	Non-classified finish (NC)
Purple	Retired, not classified (Ret)
Red	Did not qualify (DNQ)
Red	Did not pre-qualify (DNPQ)
Black	Disqualified (DSQ)
White	Did not start (DNS)
White	Withdrew (WD)
White	Race cancelled (C)
Blank	Did not practice (DNP)
Blank	Did not arrive (DNA)
Blank	Excluded (EX)

=== World RX Team's Championship ===
Pos.	Driver	No.	SWE (Sweden)		HUN (Hungary)		BLX (Belgium)		PRT (Portugal)		TÜR (Turkey)		Points
1	(Sweden) KMS - HORSE Powertrain	1	1	1	5	1	4	1	1	2	6	2	430
1	(Sweden) KMS - HORSE Powertrain	96	5	3	2	2	2	3	4	5	1	6	430
2	(Sweden) Hansen World RX Team	21	4	6	4	4	1	5	6	3	3	3	378
2	(Sweden) Hansen World RX Team	71	6	4	6	5	3	2	3	1	3	4	378
3	(Sweden) Construction Equipment Dealer Team	12	2	8	9	3	5	6	8	4	7	8	322
3	(Sweden) Construction Equipment Dealer Team	68	7	2	1	9	7	4	2	6	2	5	322
Pos.	Driver		SWE (Sweden)		HUN (Hungary)		BLX (Belgium)		PRT (Portugal)		TÜR (Turkey)		Points
