= 2025 FIA World Rallycross Championship =

Auto racing championship

The 2025 FIA World Rallycross Championship (World RX) was the twelfth and last season of the FIA World Rallycross Championship rally racing championship recognized by the Fédération Internationale de l'Automobile (FIA) as the highest class of international rallycross.

== Calendar ==
On the 17th of October 2024, the calendar for the 2025 season was announced. It was due to start on the 23rd of January 2025 in Canada on a brand new ice-surface circuit, and featured a further seven rounds in Hungary, Portugal, Great Britain, Finland, Sweden, Turkey and Australia. It was due to conclude on the 23rd of November 2025. The venue for the season opener in Canada, the Circuit de Trois-Rivières, put out a statement on Instagram on December 13, 2024, that the round had been postponed to 2026. The original calendar was then removed from official FIA World Rallycross sources, and on 16 January 2025, the series put out a statement saying the process to find a new series promoter was underway. A statement was put out by the Nyírad Racing Center on 23 February 2025 that stated the previously scheduled round in Hungary had been cancelled. A new calendar was announced by the FIA on Instagram on 27 March 2025. It featured six rounds, of which one was at a yet unannounced venue. On 14 August 2025, the series announced that the previously scheduled unannounced event in November had been cancelled, and instead the World RX of Turkey had been converted into a double header season finale to preserve the six events that were planned.

| Rnd | Event | Date | Venue | Winning driver | Winning team | Report |
|---|---|---|---|---|---|---|
| 1 | World RX of Portugal | 31 May–1 June | Circuito Automóvel de Lousada, Lousada | (Finland) Niclas Grönholm | (Sweden) CE Dealer Team | Report |
| 2 | World RX of Sweden | 5–6 July | Höljesbanan, Höljes | (Sweden) Johan Kristoffersson | (Sweden) Kristoffersson Motorsport | Report |
| 3 | World RX of Hungary | 19–20 July | Nyirád Racing Center, Nyirád | (Sweden) Johan Kristoffersson | (Sweden) Kristoffersson Motorsport | Report |
| 4 | World RX of Finland | 23–24 August | Kymiring, Kausala | (Norway) Ole Christian Veiby | (Sweden) Kristoffersson Motorsport | Report |
| 5 | World RX of Turkey | 20–21 September | TOSFED İstanbul Park, Istanbul | (Sweden) Johan Kristoffersson | (Sweden) Kristoffersson Motorsport | Report |
| 6 | World RX of Turkey | 20–21 September | TOSFED İstanbul Park, Istanbul | (Norway) Ole Christian Veiby | (Sweden) Kristoffersson Motorsport | Report |

== Series News ==
- On 13 November 2024, it was reported that the FIA had launched a process to find a new promoter for the series after four years of management by Rallycross Promoter, which took over from IMG in 2021. On 10 March 2025 it was announced that the FIA had made a direct investment into the series and will take over operation of it with immediate effect. They announced that the FIA will operate the series with the support of a service provider.
- As part of the FIA announcement, it was announced that the series would return to free-to-air coverage with a priority on digital accessibility.
- On 5 December 2024, the FIA published their strategic vision for the future of their off-road championships. It stated that the Battle of Technologies-ruleset that was introduced in 2024 will remain until 2026. Following that, the goal is to propose a chassis based on the 2027 WRC technical regulations.
- On 4 April 2025, the FIA published the updated sporting and technical regulations for the championship. The weekend format was reverted to a time-based heat system that was previously used in the championship. Grids for the first heat will be decided by a random draw, and the following heats by position in the previous heat. Heat races will be run over 4 laps, semi-finals over 5 laps, and finals over 6 laps. The regulations were also updated to allow for FIA European Rallycross Championship competitors to compete in the heats alongside the World RX competitors but with separate classifications. The point system was also updated.

== Entries ==
=== RX1 ===
| Constructor | Team | Type | Model | No. | Drivers | Rounds | Ref |
|---|---|---|---|---|---|---|---|
| Hyundai | (France) PGRX | ICE | Hyundai i20 RX | 18 | (Finland) Juha Rytkönen | 1–4 | |
| Peugeot | (United Kingdom) Team RX Racing | ICE | Peugeot 208 RX | 7 | (Republic of Ireland) Patrick O'Donovan | 1–3 | |
| Peugeot | (France) GCK | ICE | Peugeot 208 RX | 8 | (France) Anthony Pelfrène | 1 | |
| Peugeot | (Sweden) Hansen World RX Team | EV | Peugeot 208 RX1e | 21 | (Sweden) Timmy Hansen | 1–4 | |
| Peugeot | (Sweden) Hansen World RX Team | EV | Peugeot 208 RX1e | 71 | (Sweden) Kevin Hansen | 1–4 | |
| PWR Racing | (Sweden) Construction Equipment Dealer Team | EV | PWR RX1e | 12 | (Sweden) Klara Andersson | All | |
| PWR Racing | (Sweden) Construction Equipment Dealer Team | EV | PWR RX1e | 68 | (Finland) Niclas Grönholm | All | |
| Volkswagen | (Sweden) Kristoffersson Motorsport | ICE | Volkswagen Polo KMS 601 RX | 1 | (Sweden) Johan Kristoffersson | 1 | |
| Volkswagen | (Sweden) Kristoffersson Motorsport | ICE | Volkswagen Polo KMS 601 RX | 96 | (Norway) Ole Christian Veiby | 1 | |
| Volkswagen | (Sweden) Kristoffersson Motorsport | EV | Volkswagen Polo RX1e | 1 | (Sweden) Johan Kristoffersson | 2–6 | |
| Volkswagen | (Sweden) Kristoffersson Motorsport | EV | Volkswagen Polo RX1e | 17 | (Sweden) Gustav Bergström | 2 | |
| Volkswagen | (Sweden) Kristoffersson Motorsport | EV | Volkswagen Polo RX1e | 96 | (Norway) Ole Christian Veiby | 2–6 | |
Wildcard entries ineligible for points
| Audi | (Germany) Volland Racing | ICE | Audi S1 RX | 30 | (Germany) Nils Volland | 6 | |
| Audi | (Germany) Volland Racing | ICE | Audi S1 RX | 95 | (Switzerland) Yury Belevskiy | 6 | |
| Audi | (Poland) Automax Motorsport | ICE | Audi S1 RX | 66 | (Poland) Damian Litwinowicz | 6 | |
| Audi | (Hungary) Nyirád Racing Center Nonprofit Kft | ICE | Audi S1 RX | 73 | (Hungary) Tamás Kárai | 6 | |
| Ford | (Hungary) Nyirád Motorsport Kft | ICE | Ford Fiesta RX | 50 | (Hungary) Attila Mózer | 6 | |
| Ford | (Hungary) Nyirád Motorsport Kft | ICE | Ford Fiesta RX | 51 | (Hungary) Márk Mózer | 6 | |
| Hyundai | (France) PGRX | ICE | Hyundai i20 RX | 20 | (Finland) Joni Turpeinen | 6 | |
| Hyundai | (France) PGRX | ICE | Hyundai i20 RX | 37 | (Finland) Mika Liimatainen | 6 | |
| SEAT | (Germany) ALL-INKL.COM Münnich Motorsport | ICE | SEAT Ibiza RX | 38 | (Germany) Mandie August | 6 | |
| SEAT | (Germany) ALL-INKL.COM Münnich Motorsport | ICE | SEAT Ibiza RX | 77 | (Germany) René Münnich | 6 | |

== Championship standings ==
Points are scored as follows:

| Position | 1st | 2nd | 3rd | 4th | 5th | 6th | 7th | 8th | 9th | 10th | 11th | 12th | 13th | 14th | 15th | 16th | 17th | 18th |
|---|---|---|---|---|---|---|---|---|---|---|---|---|---|---|---|---|---|---|
| Final points | 25 | 20 | 17 | 15 | 14 | 13 | 12 | 11 | 10 | 9 | 8 | 7 | 6 | 5 | 4 | 3 | 2 | 1 |
| Heat ranking | 3 | 2 | 1 | | | | | | | | | | | | | | | |

=== World RX Driver's Championship ===
| Pos. | Driver | PRT (Portugal) | SWE (Sweden) | HUN (Hungary) | FIN (Finland) | TÜR1 (Turkey) | TÜR2 (Turkey) | Points |
|---|---|---|---|---|---|---|---|---|
| 1 | (Sweden) Johan Kristoffersson | 5^{2} | 1^{1} | 1^{1} | 2^{1} | 1^{2} | 2^{2} | 144 |
| 2 | (Finland) Niclas Grönholm | 1^{1} | 2^{2} | 6^{2} | 6^{2} | 2^{1} | 3^{3} | 121 |
| 3 | (Norway) Ole Christian Veiby | 3 | 7 | 2^{3} | 1^{3} | 4^{3} | 1^{1} | 120 |
| 4 | (Sweden) Klara Andersson | 6 | 8 | 4 | 7 | 3 | 5 | 83 |
| 5 | (Sweden) Timmy Hansen | 2^{3} | 3 | 3 | 4 | | | 70 |
| 6 | (Sweden) Kevin Hansen | 4 | 6 | 8 | 3 | | | 56 |
| 7 | (Finland) Juha Rytkönen | 7 | 4^{3} | 5 | 5 | | | 56 |
| 8 | (Republic of Ireland) Patrick O'Donovan | 8 | 5 | 7 | | | | 37 |
| 9 | (Sweden) Gustav Bergström | | 9 | | | | | 10 |
| 10 | (France) Anthony Pelfrene | 9 | | | | | | 10 |
Wildcard entries ineligible for points
| — | (Finland) Joni Turpeinen | | | | | | 4 | — |
| — | (Germany) Nils Volland | | | | | | 6 | — |
| — | (Poland) Damian Litwinowicz | | | | | | 7 | — |
| — | (Hungary) Attila Mózer | | | | | | 8 | — |
| — | (Finland) Mika Liimatainen | | | | | | 9 | — |
| — | (Switzerland) Yury Belevskiy | | | | | | 10 | — |
| — | (Hungary) Tamás Kárai | | | | | | 11 | — |
| — | (Germany) René Münnich | | | | | | 12 | — |
| — | (Hungary) Márk Mózer | | | | | | 13 | — |
| — | (Germany) Mandie August | | | | | | 14 | — |
| Pos. | Driver | PRT (Portugal) | SWE (Sweden) | HUN (Hungary) | FIN (Finland) | TÜR1 (Turkey) | TÜR2 (Turkey) | Points |

| Colour | Result |
|---|---|
| Gold | Winner |
| Silver | Second place |
| Bronze | Third place |
| Green | Points classification |
| Blue | Non-points classification |
| Blue | Non-classified finish (NC) |
| Purple | Retired, not classified (Ret) |
| Red | Did not qualify (DNQ) |
| Red | Did not pre-qualify (DNPQ) |
| Black | Disqualified (DSQ) |
| White | Did not start (DNS) |
| White | Withdrew (WD) |
| White | Race cancelled (C) |
| Blank | Did not practice (DNP) |
| Blank | Did not arrive (DNA) |
| Blank | Excluded (EX) |

In-line notation
| ^{1–3} | Top 3 heat ranking |

=== World RX Team's Championship ===
| Pos. | Driver | No. | PRT (Portugal) | SWE (Sweden) | HUN (Hungary) | FIN (Finland) | TÜR1 (Turkey) | TÜR2 (Turkey) | Points |
|---|---|---|---|---|---|---|---|---|---|
| 1 | (Sweden) Kristoffersson Motorsport | 1 | 5^{2} | 1^{1} | 1^{1} | 2^{1} | 1^{2} | 2^{2} | 264 |
| 1 | (Sweden) Kristoffersson Motorsport | 96 | 3 | 7 | 2^{3} | 1^{3} | 4^{3} | 1^{1} | 264 |
| 2 | (Sweden) Construction Equipment Dealer Team | 12 | 6 | 8 | 4 | 7 | 3 | 5 | 204 |
| 2 | (Sweden) Construction Equipment Dealer Team | 68 | 1^{1} | 2^{2} | 6^{2} | 6^{2} | 2^{1} | 3^{3} | 204 |
| 3 | (Sweden) Hansen World RX Team | 21 | 2^{3} | 3 | 3 | 4 | | | 126 |
| 3 | (Sweden) Hansen World RX Team | 71 | 4 | 6 | 8 | 3 | | | 126 |
| Pos. | Driver | | PRT (Portugal) | SWE (Sweden) | HUN (Hungary) | FIN (Finland) | TÜR1 (Turkey) | TÜR2 (Turkey) | Points |
