= 2023 FIA World Rallycross Championship =

Auto racing championship

The 2023 FIA World Rallycross Championship was the tenth season of the FIA World Rallycross Championship, an auto racing championship recognized by the Fédération Internationale de l'Automobile (FIA) as the highest class of international rallycross.

Johan Kristoffersson won his fourth consecutive drivers championship and his sixth title overall at round 9 in Hong Kong. Kristoffersson Motorsport entered as the reigning teams champions.

== Calendar ==
On 7 December 2022, the provisional 2023 calendar was announced during the FIA World Motorsport Council decisions. A calendar update was issued on 3 March 2023. On 21 March, the World RX of Hong Kong, China was announced as the season finale. The event hosted in Hong Kong will mark the first ever championship round in the Asia-Pacific region.

Rnd	Event	Date	Venue	Winning driver	Winning team	Report
1	World RX of Portugal	3–4 June	Pista Automóvel de Montalegre, Montalegre	(Sweden) Johan Kristoffersson	(Sweden) Volkswagen Dealerteam BAUHAUS	Report
2	World RX of Norway	17–18 June	Lånkebanen, Hell	(Sweden) Johan Kristoffersson	(Sweden) Volkswagen Dealerteam BAUHAUS	Report
3	World RX of Sweden	1–2 July	Höljesbanan, Höljes	(Sweden) Johan Kristoffersson	(Sweden) Volkswagen Dealerteam BAUHAUS	Report
4	World RX of the United Kingdom	22–23 July	Lydden Hill Race Circuit, Canterbury	Cancelled (Note: Following a fire that broke out in Special ONE Racings garage on the Friday, the Lydden Hill race weekend was cancelled for the RX1e class while the cause was being investigated.)		Report
5	(Belgium) World RX of Benelux	5–6 August	Circuit Jules Tacheny Mettet, Mettet	Cancelled		Report
6	World RX of Germany	19–20 August	Estering, Buxtehude	Cancelled		Report
7	World RX of South Africa	7–8 October	Killarney Motor Racing Complex, Cape Town	(Sweden) Johan Kristoffersson	(Sweden) Volkswagen Dealerteam BAUHAUS	Report
8	World RX of South Africa	7–8 October	Killarney Motor Racing Complex, Cape Town	(Germany) Timo Scheider	(Germany) ALL-INKL.COM Münnich Motorsport	Report
9	World RX of Hong Kong, China	11–12 November	Central Harbourfront Circuit, Hong Kong	(Sweden) Kevin Hansen	(Sweden) Hansen World RX Team	Report
10	World RX of Hong Kong, China	11–12 November	Central Harbourfront Circuit, Hong Kong	(Sweden) Johan Kristoffersson	(Sweden) Volkswagen Dealerteam BAUHAUS	Report

== Series News ==
- After having trialed a new weekend format in 2022, the format was adjusted again for the 2023 season. The weekend structure was reverted to a system of four heats of five cars (reduced to three heats at double-header events), with two semis and a final with six cars each using a staggered grid. Free practice replaced the shakedown as the first session of the weekend. SuperPole was retained from the 2022 season. Heat 2 will have the fastest drivers from heat 1 going first, whereas heat 3 and 4 will have the slowest drivers from the previous heat going first. At the end of the heats, the top 3 drivers in the heat ranking will be given championship points; 3 to the winner of the heat rankings, 2 to second, and 1 to third. After the final, championship points are awarded to the top 15 drivers across the whole weekend.

== Incidents ==
- On 21 July 2023, at the Lydden Hill Race Circuit in Canterbury, Special ONE Racing's garage was completely destroyed in a fire. Both of the team's Lancia Delta Evo-e RX electric cars were completely destroyed. No one was injured in the fire. For this reason, the World RX of United Kingdom was subsequently cancelled for the RX1e class while a cause was being investigated. Special ONE Racing pulled out of the final six rounds of the season as a result of the incident.
- On 31 July 2023, the World RX of Benelux was also cancelled for the RX1e class since investigations were still ongoing as to what the cause of the Lydden Hill fire was. Subsequently, Johan Kristoffersson, Ole Christian Veiby, Timmy Hansen and Kevin Hansen were all confirmed to take part in the RX2e class at the event instead.
- On 1 September 2023, it was announced that the final four rounds of the season in Hong Kong and South Africa would go ahead with the RX1e class drivers competing in the ZEROID X1 car used in the RX2e class. The RX2e season finished at the event before in Germany.

== Entries ==
=== RX1e ===
Constructor (Note: All the cars in the 2023 FIA World Rallycross Championship are powered by the same electric powertrain developed by Kreisel Electric.)	Team	Model	No.	Drivers	Rounds	Ref
GCK Performance	(France) Special ONE Racing	Lancia Delta Evo-E RX	9	(France) Sébastien Loeb	1–4	
GCK Performance	(France) Special ONE Racing	Lancia Delta Evo-E RX	36	(France) Guerlain Chicherit	1–4	
Peugeot	(Sweden) Hansen World RX Team	Peugeot 208 RX1e	21	(Sweden) Timmy Hansen	1–4	
Peugeot	(Sweden) Hansen World RX Team	Peugeot 208 RX1e	71	(Sweden) Kevin Hansen	1–4	
PWR Racing	(Sweden) Construction Equipment Dealer Team	PWR RX1e	12	(Sweden) Klara Andersson	1–4	
PWR Racing	(Sweden) Construction Equipment Dealer Team	PWR RX1e	68	(Finland) Niclas Grönholm	1–4	
SEAT	(Germany) ALL-INKL.COM Münnich Motorsport	SEAT Ibiza RX1e	44	(Germany) Timo Scheider	1–4	
Volkswagen	(Sweden) Volkswagen Dealerteam BAUHAUS	Volkswagen Polo RX1e	1	(Sweden) Johan Kristoffersson	1–4	
Volkswagen	(Sweden) Volkswagen Dealerteam BAUHAUS	Volkswagen Polo RX1e	17	(Sweden) Gustav Bergström	1–3	
Volkswagen	(Sweden) Volkswagen Dealerteam BAUHAUS	Volkswagen Polo RX1e	69	(Norway) Sondre Evjen	4	
Volkswagen	(Sweden) Volkswagen Dealerteam BAUHAUS	Volkswagen Polo RX1e	96	(Norway) Ole Christian Veiby	1–4	

=== RX2e ===
Constructor (Note: All drivers competed in OMSE ZEROID X1 cars for the final four rounds in Hong Kong and South Africa.)	Team	Car	No.	Drivers	Rounds	Ref
QEV Technologies	(Sweden) Volkswagen Dealerteam BAUHAUS	ZEROID X1	1	(Sweden) Johan Kristoffersson	7–10	
QEV Technologies	(Sweden) Volkswagen Dealerteam BAUHAUS	ZEROID X1	19	(Sweden) Mikaela Åhlin-Kottulinsky	9–10	
QEV Technologies	(Sweden) Volkswagen Dealerteam BAUHAUS	ZEROID X1	96	(Norway) Ole Christian Veiby	7–10	
QEV Technologies	(Sweden) Hansen World RX Team	ZEROID X1	7	(United Kingdom) Patrick O'Donovan	9–10	
QEV Technologies	(Sweden) Hansen World RX Team	ZEROID X1	21	(Sweden) Timmy Hansen	7–10	
QEV Technologies	(Sweden) Hansen World RX Team	ZEROID X1	71	(Sweden) Kevin Hansen	7–10	
QEV Technologies	(Sweden) Construction Equipment Dealer Team	ZEROID X1	12	(Sweden) Klara Andersson	7–10	
QEV Technologies	(Sweden) Construction Equipment Dealer Team	ZEROID X1	68	(Finland) Niclas Grönholm	7–10	
QEV Technologies	(Germany) ALL-INKL.COM Münnich Motorsport	ZEROID X1	44	(Germany) Timo Scheider	7–10	
QEV Technologies	(Germany) ALL-INKL.COM Münnich Motorsport	ZEROID X1	77	(Germany) René Münnich	7–10	

== Championship standings ==
Bonus points are awarded for finishing in the top 3 of the heat ranking. Points are scored as follows:

Position	1st	2nd	3rd	4th	5th	6th	7th	8th	9th	10th	11th	12th	13th	14th	15th
Points	20	16	13	12	11	10	9	8	7	6	5	4	3	2	1

=== RX1e Driver's Championship ===
Pos.	Driver	POR (Portugal)	NOR (Norway)	SWE (Sweden)	GBR (United Kingdom)	BLX (Belgium)	GER (Germany)	ZAF (South Africa)		HKG (Hong Kong)		Points
1	(Sweden) Johan Kristoffersson	1^{1}	1^{1}	1^{1}	C	C	C	1^{1}	3^{2}	6^{3}	1^{1}	141
2	(Sweden) Kevin Hansen	2	9^{3}	4^{2}	C	C	C	2	2^{3}	1^{1}	7^{3}	104
3	(Finland) Niclas Grönholm	3^{2}	2^{2}	7	C	C	C	5	6	2^{2}	5^{2}	94
4	(Germany) Timo Scheider	9	3	5	C	C	C	3^{3}	1^{1}	3	8	89
5	(Norway) Ole Christian Veiby	4	6	3	C	C	C	6	7	4	2	82
6	(Sweden) Timmy Hansen	7^{3}	10	2^{3}	C	C	C	4^{2}	4	9	4	78
7	(Sweden) Klara Andersson	5	4	9	C	C	C	7	5	5	6	71
8	(Germany) René Münnich							8	8	8	10	30
9	(France) Sébastien Loeb	6	5	8	C							29
10	(France) Guerlain Chicherit	8	7	6	C							27
11	(United Kingdom) Patrick O'Donovan									7	3	22
12	(Sweden) Gustav Bergström	10	8	10		C	C					20
13	(Sweden) Mikaela Åhlin-Kottulinsky									10	9	13
-	(Norway) Sondre Evjen				C							-
Pos.	Driver	POR (Portugal)	NOR (Norway)	SWE (Sweden)	GBR (United Kingdom)	BLX (Belgium)	GER (Germany)	ZAF (South Africa)		HKG (Hong Kong)		Points

Colour	Result
Gold	Winner
Silver	Second place
Bronze	Third place
Green	Points classification
Blue	Non-points classification
Blue	Non-classified finish (NC)
Purple	Retired, not classified (Ret)
Red	Did not qualify (DNQ)
Red	Did not pre-qualify (DNPQ)
Black	Disqualified (DSQ)
White	Did not start (DNS)
White	Withdrew (WD)
White	Race cancelled (C)
Blank	Did not practice (DNP)
Blank	Did not arrive (DNA)
Blank	Excluded (EX)

In-line notation
^{1–3}	Top 3 heat ranking

=== RX1e Team's Championship ===
Pos.	Driver	No.	POR (Portugal)	NOR (Norway)	SWE (Sweden)	GBR (United Kingdom)	BLX (Belgium)	GER (Germany)	Points
1	(Sweden) Volkswagen Dealerteam BAUHAUS	1	1^{1}	1^{1}	1^{1}	C	C	C	104
1	(Sweden) Volkswagen Dealerteam BAUHAUS	96	4	6	3	C	C	C	104
2	(Sweden) Construction Equipment Dealer Team	12	5	4	9	C	C	C	72
2	(Sweden) Construction Equipment Dealer Team	68	3^{2}	2^{2}	7	C	C	C	72
3	(Sweden) Hansen World RX Team	21	7^{3}	10	2^{3}	C	C	C	71
3	(Sweden) Hansen World RX Team	71	2	9^{3}	4^{2}	C	C	C	71
4	(France) Special ONE Racing	9	6 (Note: Special ONE Racing was deducted 10 championship points for holding private testing without submitting the necessary application to the FIA.)	5	8	C			46
4	(France) Special ONE Racing	36	8	7	6	C			46
Pos.	Driver		POR (Portugal)	NOR (Norway)	SWE (Sweden)	GBR (United Kingdom)	BLX (Belgium)	GER (Germany)	Points
