= 2015 World RX of Sweden =

Rallycross event

- Round 6 of 13 in the 2015 FIA World Rallycross Championship
- Date: 4–5 July 2015
- Location: Höljes, Värmland
- Venue: Höljesbanan

Results
Heat winners
- Heat 1: (Sweden) Timmy Hansen; Team Peugeot-Hansen
- Heat 2: (Norway) Andreas Bakkerud; Olsbergs MSE
- Heat 3: (Norway) Petter Solberg; SDRX
- Heat 4: (Norway) Petter Solberg; SDRX
Semi-final winners
- Semi-final 1: (Sweden) Timmy Hansen; Team Peugeot-Hansen
- Semi-final 2: (Norway) Andreas Bakkerud; Olsbergs MSE
Final
- First: (Sweden) Mattias Ekström; EKS RX
- Second: (Sweden) Timmy Hansen; Team Peugeot-Hansen
- Third: (Norway) Andreas Bakkerud; Olsbergs MSE

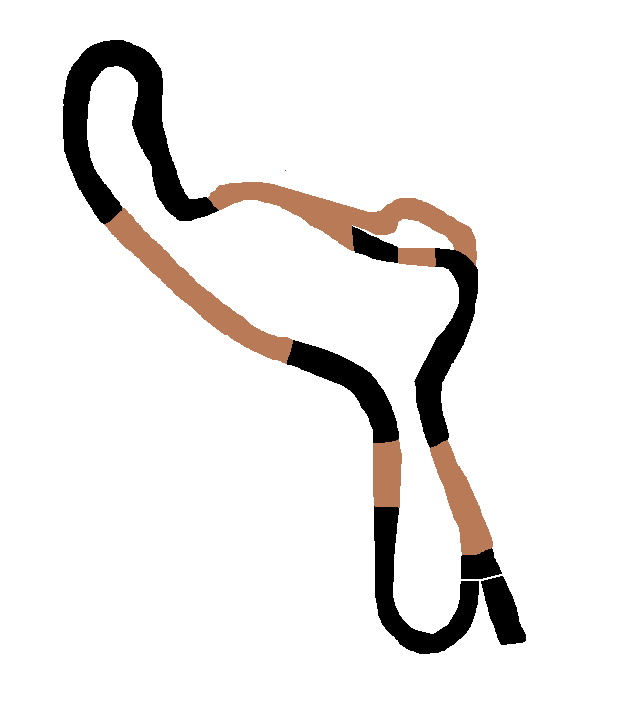
Rallycross layout of the Höljesbanan

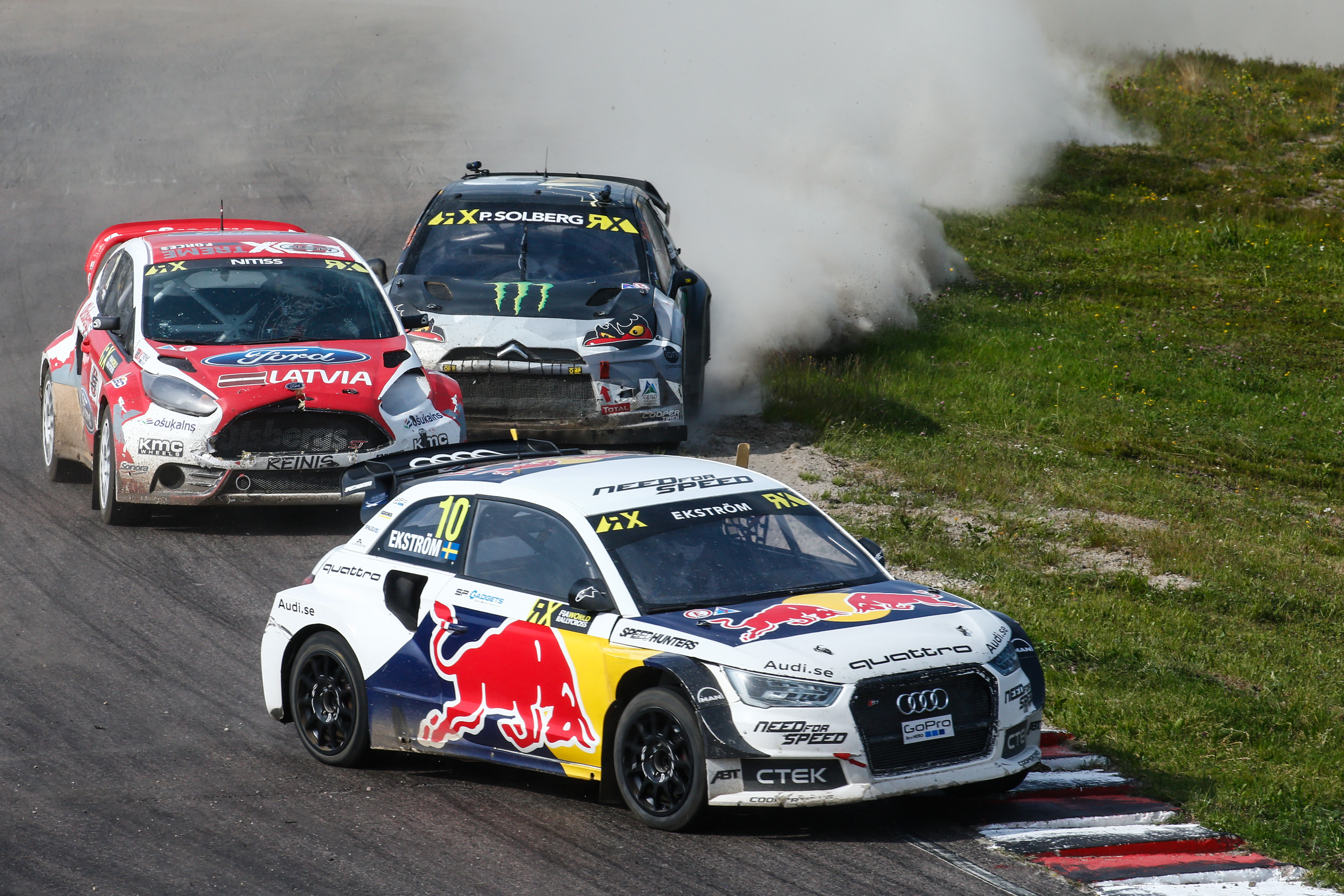
Mattias Ekström, Reinis Nitišs and Petter Solberg

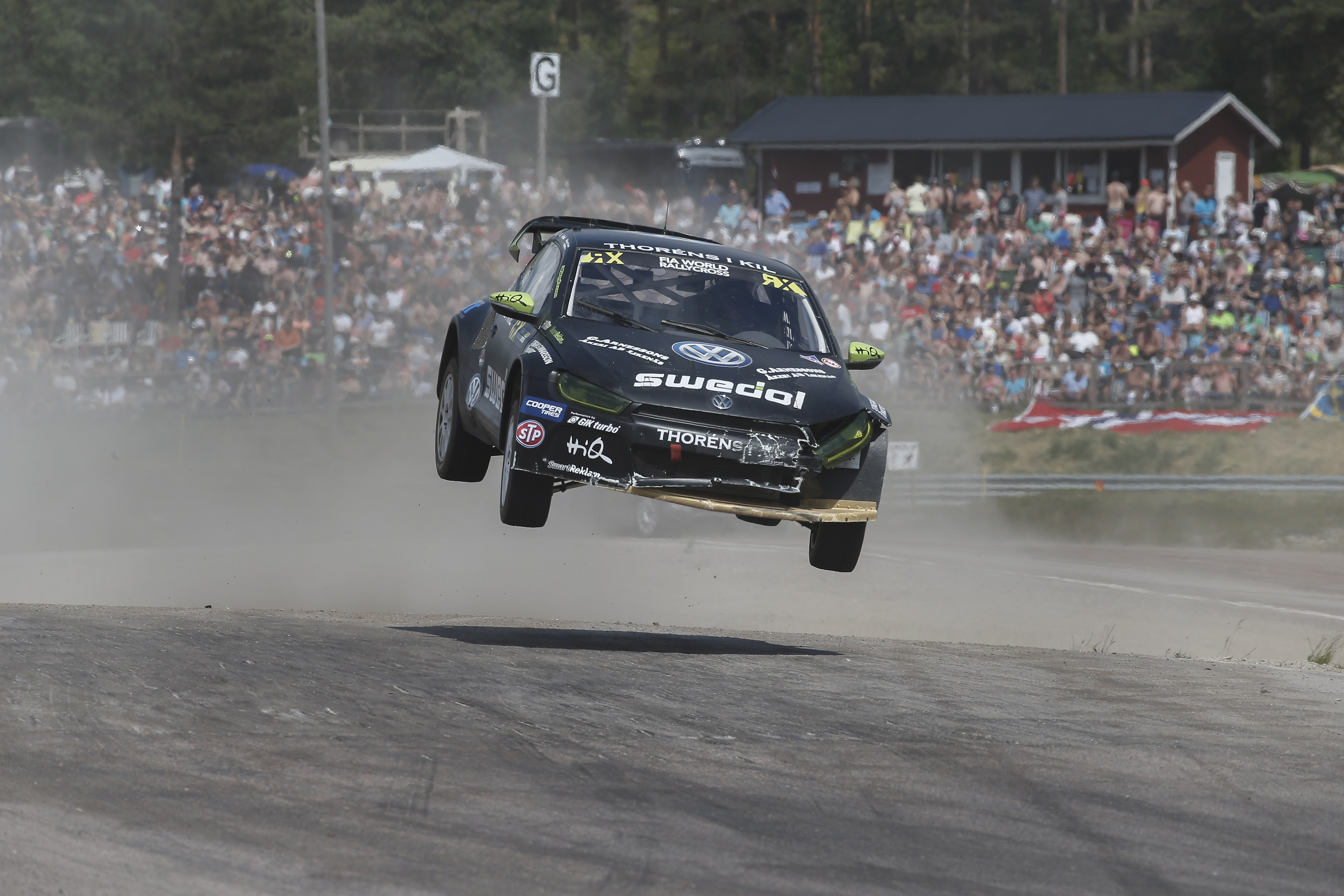
Ramona Karlsson

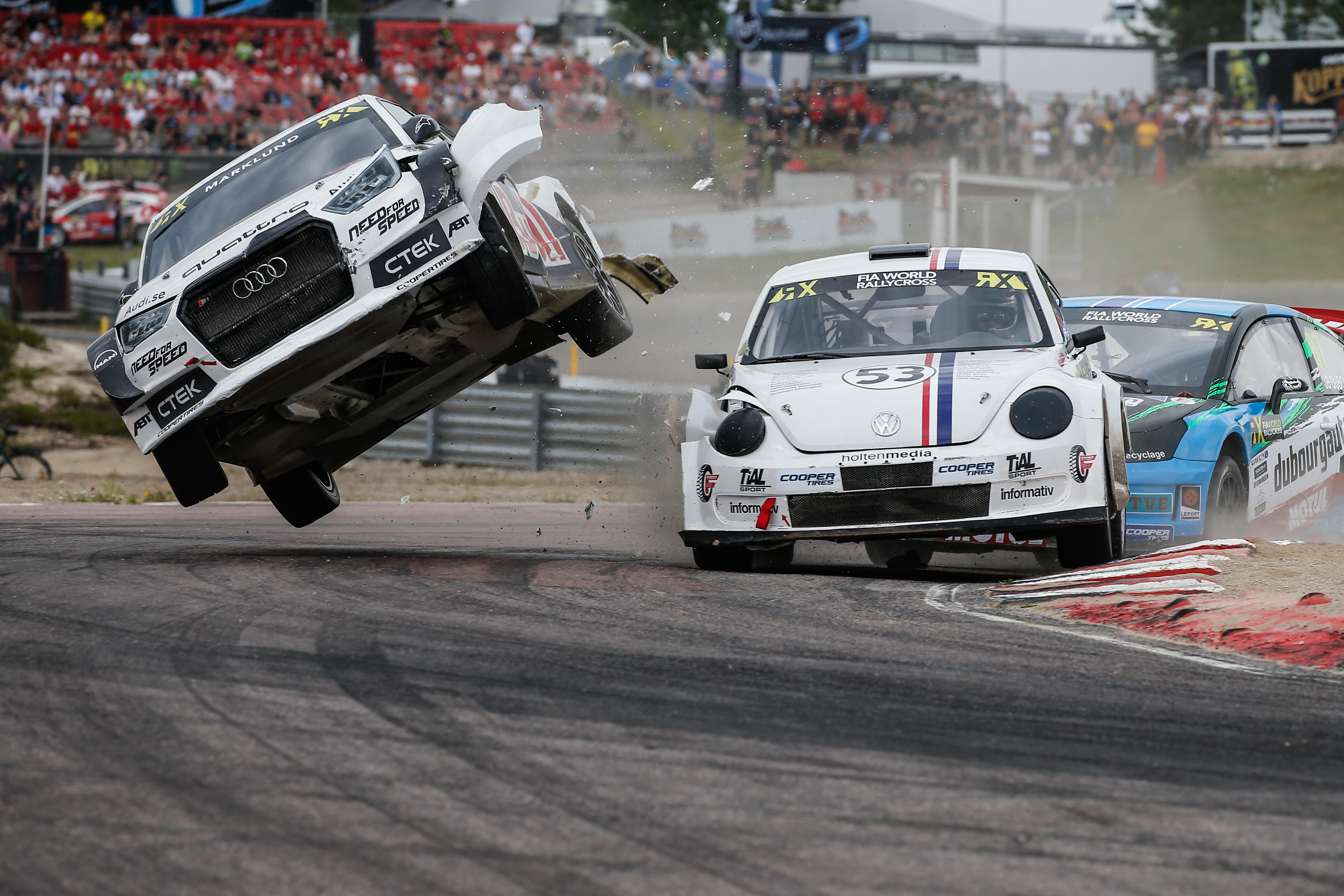
Anton Marklund (airborne), Daniel Holten and Jean-Baptiste Dubourg (background)

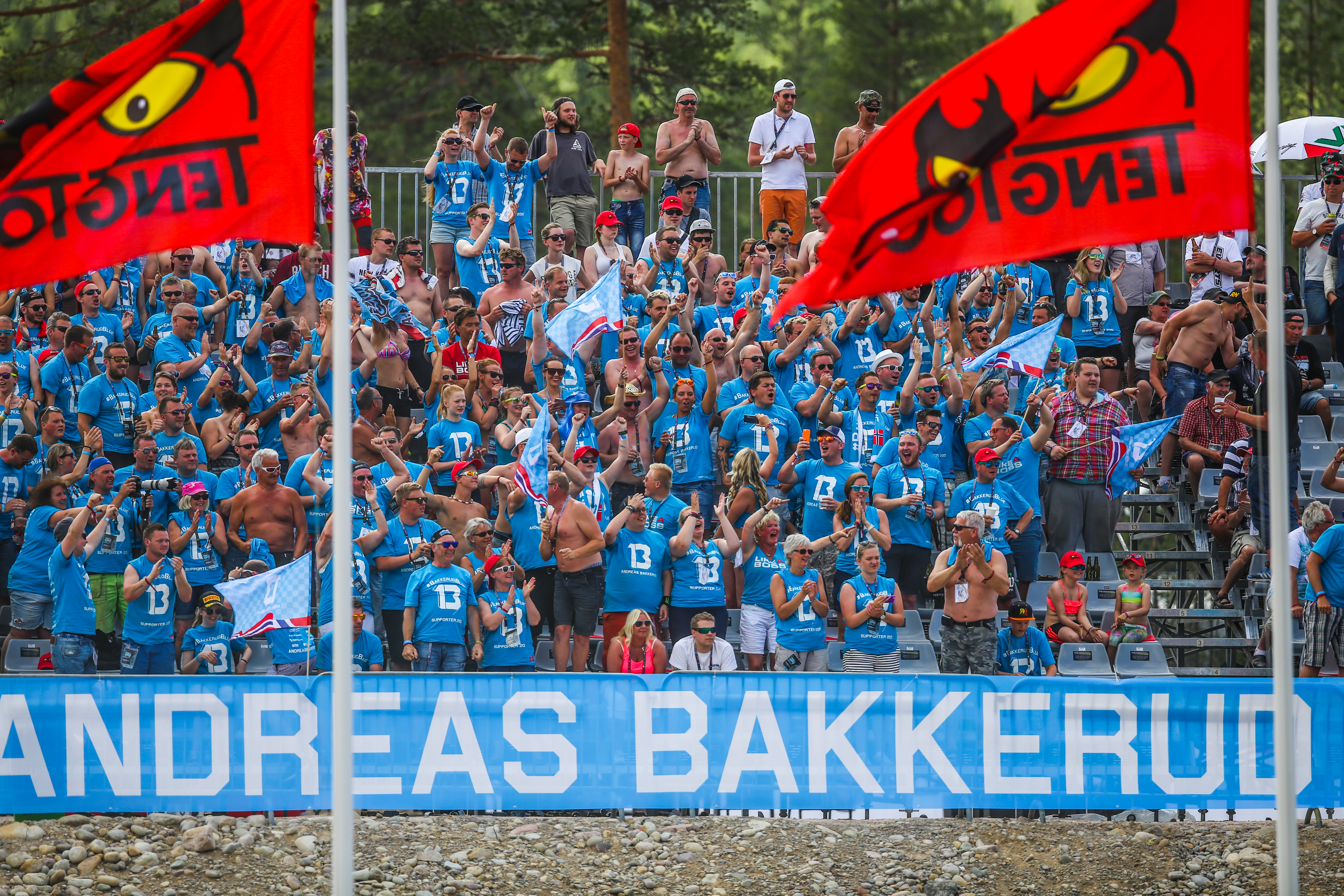
Fans of Andreas Bakkerud

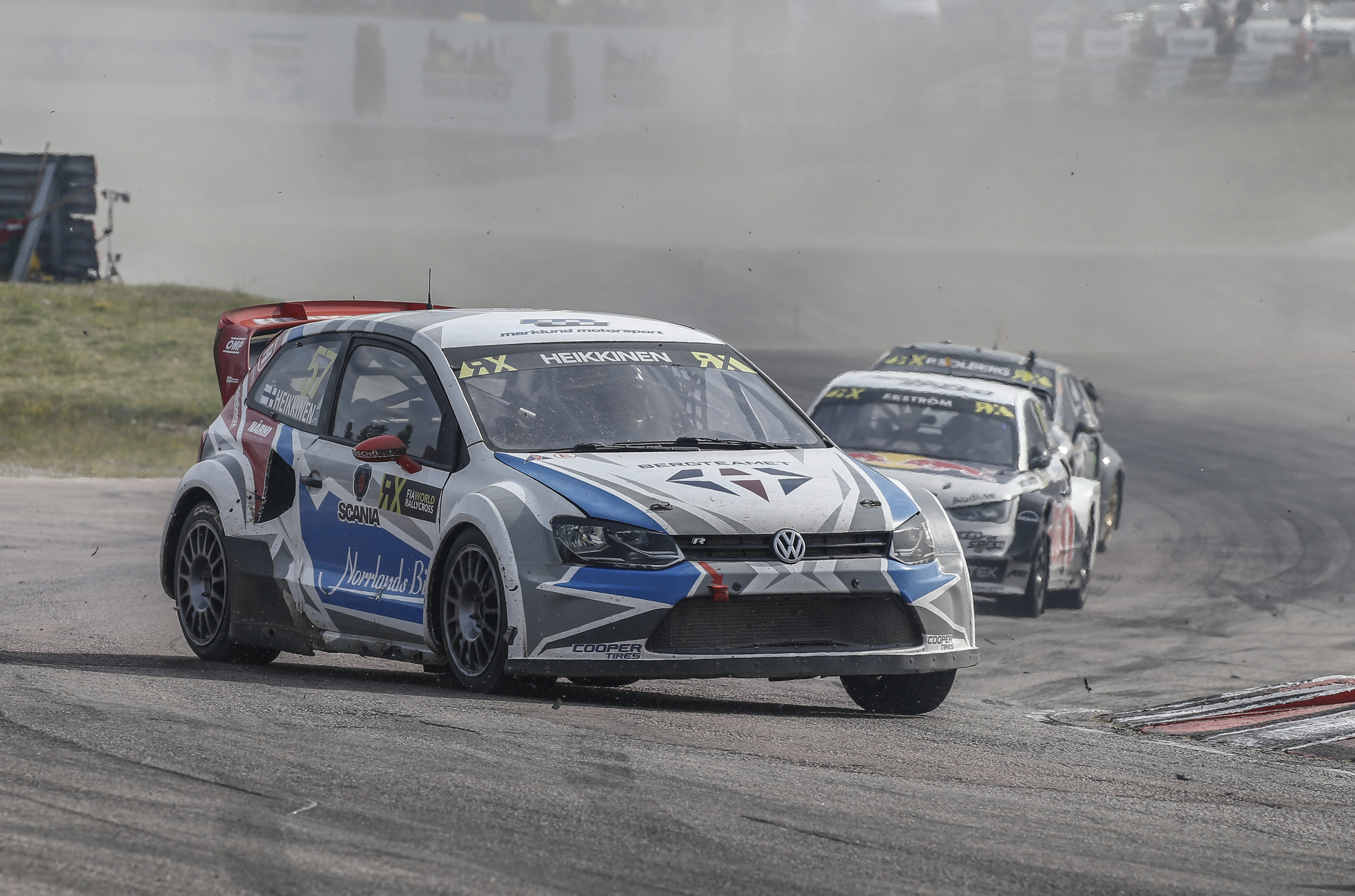
Toomas Heikkinen

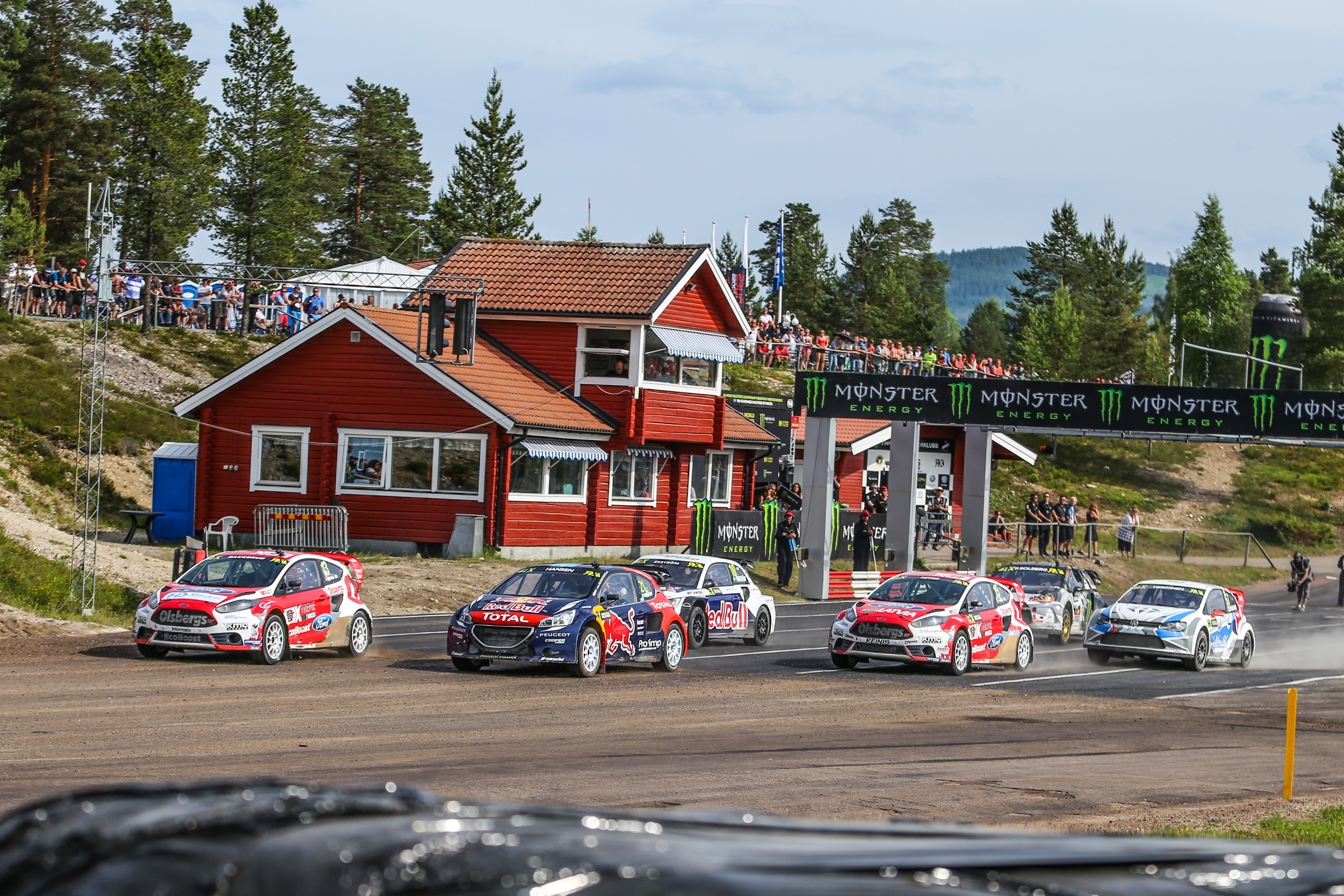
The start of the final

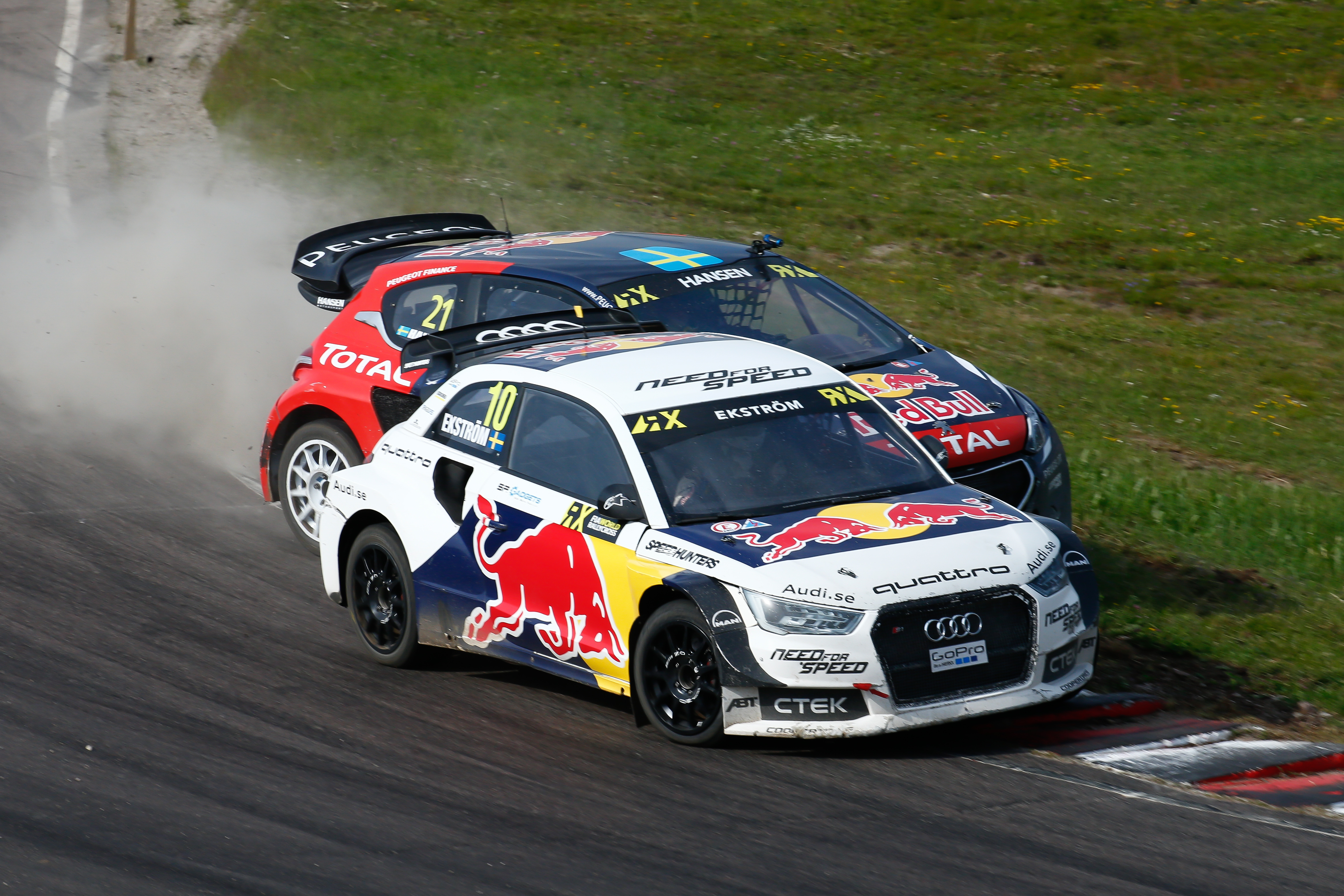
Timmy Hansen takes the lead from Ekström at the final corner. He was judged to have cut the corner and was subsequently penalised

The 2015 World RX of Sweden was the sixth round of the second season of the FIA World Rallycross Championship. The event was held at the Höljesbanan in Höljes, Värmland.

== Heats ==
Pos.	No.	Driver	Team	Car	H1	H2	H3	H4	Pts
1	1	(Norway) Petter Solberg	SDRX	Citroën DS3	4th	6th	1st	1st	16
2	13	(Norway) Andreas Bakkerud	Olsbergs MSE	Ford Fiesta ST	6th	1st	2nd	3rd	15
3	21	(Sweden) Timmy Hansen	Team Peugeot-Hansen	Peugeot 208	1st	4th	4th	8th	14
4	10	(Sweden) Mattias Ekström	EKS RX	Audi S1	2nd	11th	5th	2nd	13
5	15	(Latvia) Reinis Nitišs	Olsbergs MSE	Ford Fiesta ST	7th	2nd	9th	7th	12
6	3	(Sweden) Johan Kristoffersson	Volkswagen Team Sweden	Volkswagen Polo	3rd	21st	3rd	10th	11
7	17	(France) Davy Jeanney	Team Peugeot-Hansen	Peugeot 208	23rd	3rd	7th	4th	10
8	52	(Norway) Ole Christian Veiby	Volkswagen Team Sweden	Volkswagen Polo	9th	5th	13th	11th	9
9	90	(Sweden) Eric Färén	Hansen Talent Development	Peugeot 208	5th	14th	14th	9th	8
10	42	(Russia) Timur Timerzyanov	Namus OMSE	Ford Fiesta ST	8th	10th	6th	20th	7
11	24	(Norway) Tommy Rustad	HTB Racing-Marklund Motorsport	Volkswagen Polo	10th	12th	18th	5th	6
12	57	(Finland) Toomas Heikkinen	Marklund Motorsport	Volkswagen Polo	21st	9th	11th	6th	5
13	7	(Austria) Manfred Stohl	World RX Team Austria	Ford Fiesta	11th	13th	8th	19th	4
14	33	(United Kingdom) Liam Doran	SDRX	Citroën DS3	12th	7th	15th	25th	3
15	23	(Sweden) Stig-Olov Walfridson	Helmia Motorsport	Renault Clio	16th	18th	17th	12th	2
16	45	(Sweden) Per-Gunnar Andersson	Marklund Motorsport	Volkswagen Polo	33rd	8th	10th	13th	1
17	29	(Finland) Niclas Grönholm	Niclas Grönholm	Ford Fiesta	19th	20th	16th	18th	
18	87	(France) Jean-Baptiste Dubourg	Jean-Baptiste Dubourg	Citroën C4	14th	19th	19th	21st	
19	53	(Norway) Daniel Holten	Eklund Motorsport	Volkswagen Beetle	17th	16th	28th	14th	
20	55	(Sweden) Alx Danielsson	All-Inkl.com Münnich Motorsport	Audi S3	18th	25th	21st	17th	
21	99	(Norway) Tord Linnerud	Volkswagen Team Sweden	Volkswagen Polo	28th	31st	12th	15th	
22	28	(Norway) Alexander Hvaal	JC Raceteknik	Citroën DS3	15th	15th	20th	26th	
23	14	(Norway) Frode Holte	Frode Holte Motorsport	Hyundai i20	24th	24th	30th	16th	
24	101	(Sweden) Per Eklund	Eklund Motorsport	Saab 9-3	26th	29th	23rd	22nd	
25	92	(Sweden) Anton Marklund	EKS RX	Audi S1	13th	17th	29th	31st	
26	102	(Hungary) Tamas Karai	Racing-Com	Audi A1	27th	28th	22nd	27th	
27	77	(Germany) René Münnich	All-Inkl.com Münnich Motorsport	Audi S3	30th	22nd	26th	28th	
28	32	(Norway) Ole-Kristian Nøttveit	CircleX	Volvo C30	22nd	26th	24th	30th	
29	30	(Norway) Ole Kristian Temte	Ole Kristian Temte	Citroën C4	34th	32nd	27th	23rd	
30	31	(Austria) Max Pucher	World RX Team Austria	Ford Fiesta	29th	30th	32nd	24th	
31	48	(Sweden) Lukas Walfridson	Helmia Motorsport	Renault Clio	32nd	23rd	25th	35th	
32	47	(Sweden) Ramona Karlsson	Ramona RX	Volkswagen Scirocco	31st	27th	31st	32nd	
33	88	(Norway) Henning Solberg	CircleX	Ford Focus	35th	33rd	33rd	29th	
34	4	(Sweden) Robin Larsson	Larsson Jernberg Racing Team	Audi A1	20th	34th	34th	33rd	
35	8	(Sweden) Peter Hedström	Hedströms Motorsport	Škoda Fabia	25th	35th	35th	34th	

== Semi-finals ==
=== Semi-final 1 ===
Pos.	No.	Driver	Team	Time	Pts
1	21	(Sweden) Timmy Hansen	Team Peugeot-Hansen	4:26.522	6
2	15	(Latvia) Reinis Nitišs	Olsbergs MSE	+0.935	5
3	1	(Norway) Petter Solberg	SDRX	+1.379	4
4	24	(Norway) Tommy Rustad	HTB Racing-Marklund Motorsport	+4.917	3
5	90	(Sweden) Eric Färén	Hansen Talent Development	+13.206	2
6	17	(France) Davy Jeanney	Team Peugeot-Hansen	+25.752	1

=== Semi-final 2 ===
Pos.	No.	Driver	Team	Time	Pts
1	13	(Norway) Andreas Bakkerud	Olsbergs MSE	4:28.472	6
2	10	(Sweden) Mattias Ekström	EKS RX	+0.512	5
3	57	(Finland) Toomas Heikkinen	Marklund Motorsport	+2.198	4
4	42	(Russia) Timur Timerzyanov	Namus OMSE	+2.740	3
5	52	(Norway) Ole Christian Veiby	Volkswagen Team Sweden	+4.314	2
6	3	(Sweden) Johan Kristoffersson	Volkswagen Team Sweden	+17.660	1

== Final ==
Pos.	No.	Driver	Team	Time	Pts
1	10	(Sweden) Mattias Ekström	EKS RX	4:28.114	8
2	21	(Sweden) Timmy Hansen†	Team Peugeot-Hansen	+1.698	5
3	13	(Norway) Andreas Bakkerud	Olsbergs MSE	+1.817	4
4	57	(Finland) Toomas Heikkinen	Marklund Motorsport	+4.393	3
5	15	(Latvia) Reinis Nitišs	Olsbergs MSE	+9.973	2
6	1	(Norway) Petter Solberg	SDRX	DNF	1

† Timmy Hansen was given a 2-second penalty for exceeding track limits

== Championship standings after the event ==
Pos.	Driver	Points
1	(Norway) Petter Solberg	159
2	(Sweden) Johan Kristoffersson	115
3	(Norway) Andreas Bakkerud	113
4	(Sweden) Timmy Hansen	104
5	(Latvia) Reinis Nitišs	96

Previous race: 2015 World RX of Germany	FIA World Rallycross Championship; 2015 season	Next race: 2015 World RX of Canada
Previous race: 2014 World RX of Sweden	World RX of Sweden	Next race: 2016 World RX of Sweden
