= 2023 World RX of Portugal =

Season of motor racing

- Round 1 of 10 in the 2023 FIA World Rallycross Championship
- Date: 3-4 June 2023
- Location: Montalegre, Vila Real
- Venue: Pista Automóvel de Montalegre

Results
Heat winners
- Heat 1: (Sweden) Johan Kristoffersson; Kristoffersson Motorsport
- Heat 2: (Sweden) Johan Kristoffersson; Kristoffersson Motorsport
- Heat 3: (Sweden) Johan Kristoffersson; Kristoffersson Motorsport
- Heat 4: (Sweden) Johan Kristoffersson; Kristoffersson Motorsport
Semi-final winners
- Semi-final 1: (Sweden) Johan Kristoffersson; Kristoffersson Motorsport
- Semi-final 2: (Finland) Niclas Grönholm; Construction Equipment Dealer Team
Final
- First: (Sweden) Johan Kristoffersson; Kristoffersson Motorsport
- Second: (Sweden) Kevin Hansen; Hansen World RX Team
- Third: (Finland) Niclas Grönholm; Construction Equipment Dealer Team

World RX layout of Pista Automóvel de Montalegre

The 2023 World RX of Portugal was the first round of the ninth season of the FIA World Rallycross Championship. The event was held at the new configuration of Pista Automóvel de Montalegre in Montalegre, Vila Real for the second year in a row.

== World RX1e Championship ==
=== Heats ===
Pos.	No.	Driver	Team	Car	Q1	Q2	Q3	Q4	Pts
1	1	(Sweden) Johan Kristoffersson	Kristoffersson Motorsport	Volkswagen Polo RX1e	1st	1st	1st	1st	3
2	68	(Finland) Niclas Grönholm	Construction Equipment Dealer Team	PWR RX1e	5th	2nd	2nd	7th	2
3	21	(Sweden) Timmy Hansen	Hansen World RX Team	Peugeot 208 RX1e	3rd	5th	4th	2nd	1
4	96	(Norway) Ole Christian Veiby	Kristoffersson Motorsport	Volkswagen Polo RX1e	2nd	4th	5th	5th	
5	71	(Sweden) Kevin Hansen	Hansen World RX Team	Peugeot 208 RX1e	4th	7th	3rd	3rd	
6	12	(Sweden) Klara Andersson	Construction Equipment Dealer Team	PWR RX1e	8th	6th	6th	4th	
7	9	(France) Sébastien Loeb	Special ONE Racing	Lancia Delta Evo-E RX	7th	3rd	10th	8th	
8	44	(Germany) Timo Scheider	All-Inkl.com Münnich Motorsport	SEAT Ibiza RX1e	10th	9th	7th	6th	
9	17	(Sweden) Gustav Bergström	Kristoffersson Motorsport	Volkswagen Polo RX1e	6th	8th	9th	10th	
10	36	(France) Guerlain Chicherit	Special ONE Racing	Lancia Delta Evo-E RX	9th	10thd	8th	9th	

=== Semi-finals ===
Semi-Final 1

Pos.	No.	Driver	Team	Time	Pts
1	1	(Sweden) Johan Kristoffersson	Kristoffersson Motorsport	3:30.470	
2	71	(Sweden) Kevin Hansen	Hansen World RX Team	+ 3.084	
3	9	(France) Sébastien Loeb	Special ONE Racing	+ 10.115	
4(7)	21	(Sweden) Timmy Hansen	Hansen World RX Team	DNF	9
5(10)	17	(Sweden) Gustav Bergström	Kristoffersson Motorsport	DNF	6

Best reaction: #71 00.435 Best lap: #1 0:40.310 Best joker: #21 0:03.387 Best 0.lap: #1 00:03.3710

Semi-Final 2

Pos.	No.	Driver	Team	Time	Pts
1	68	(Finland) Niclas Grönholm	Construction Equipment Dealer Team	3:29.081	
2	12	(Sweden) Klara Andersson	Construction Equipment Dealer Team	+ 1.640	
3	96	(Norway) Ole Christian Veiby	Kristoffersson Motorsport	+ 2.424	
4(8)	36	(France) Guerlain Chicherit	Special ONE Racing	+ 4.001	8
5(9)	44	(Germany) Timo Scheider	All-Inkl.com Münnich Motorsport	+ 7.692	7

Best reaction: #96 00.416 Best lap: #68 0:40.080 Best joker: #68 0:44.154 Best 0.lap: #96 00:03.3720

=== Final ===
Pos.	No.	Driver	Team	Time	Pts
1	1	(Sweden) Johan Kristoffersson	Kristoffersson Motorsport	3:30.364	20
2	71	(Sweden) Kevin Hansen	Hansen World RX Team	+ 4.728	16
3	68	(Finland) Niclas Grönholm	Construction Equipment Dealer Team	+ 4.907	13
4	96	(Norway) Ole Christian Veiby	Kristoffersson Motorsport	+ 5.373	12
5	12	(Sweden) Klara Andersson	Construction Equipment Dealer Team	+ 6.655	11
6	9	(France) Sébastien Loeb	Special ONE Racing	+ 8.884	10

Best reaction: #12 00.422 Best lap: #1 0:39.864 Best joker: #12 0:44.530 Best 0.lap: #68 00:03.4810

== Standings after the event ==
Pos.	Driver	Pts	Gap
1	(Sweden) Johan Kristoffersson	23	
2	(Sweden) Kevin Hansen	16	+7
3	(Finland) Niclas Grönholm	15	+8
4	(Norway) Ole Christian Veiby	12	+11
5	(Sweden) Klara Andersson	11	+12

- Note: Only the top five positions are included.

Previous race: 2022 World RX of Germany	FIA World Rallycross Championship; 2023 season	Next race: 2023 World RX of Norway
Previous race: 2022 World RX of Portugal	World RX of Portugal	Next race: 2024 World RX of Portugal
