= World RX of Finland =

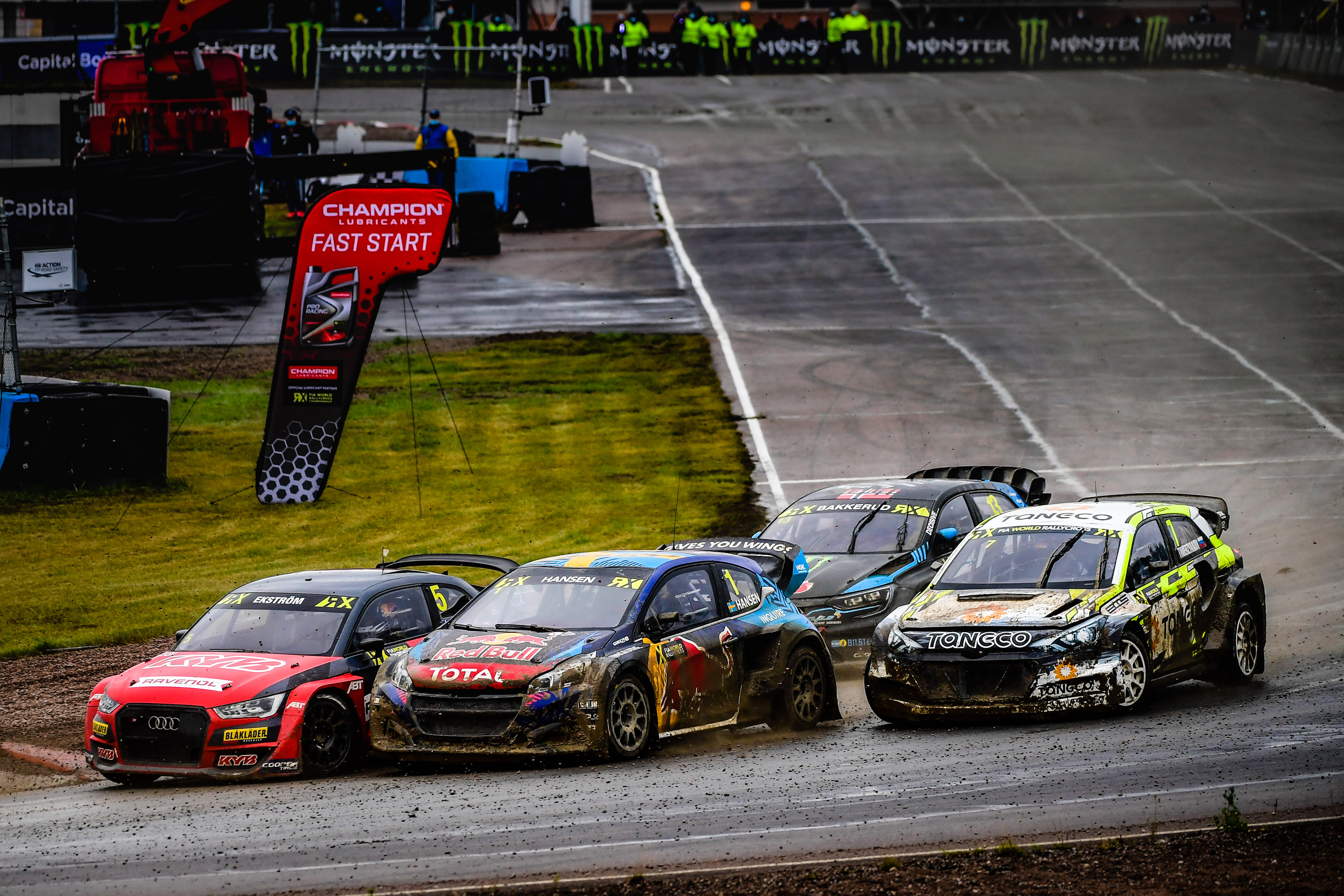
2020 World RX - RD4 Kouvola

The World RX of Finland is a Rallycross event held in Finland for the FIA World Rallycross Championship. The event made its debut in the 2014 season, at the Tykkimäki amusement park in the town of Kouvola.

In June 2020, an extraordinary World Motor Sport Council added an event in Kouvola (Finland) to replace the World RX of France as it was cancelled, due to the COVID-19 pandemic. The event was a double-header.

Track has also functioned as a competition of the Finnish rallycross championship series and RallyX.

In September 2024, it was announced that Kymiring will host World RX of Finland races for three years starting from 2025.

== Past winners ==
Year	Qualifying 1 winner	Qualifying 2 winner	Qualifying 3 winner	Qualifying 4 winner	Semi-Final 1 winner	Semi-Final 2 winner	Final winner	Rep.
2014	(Latvia) Reinis Nitišs	(Sweden) Anton Marklund	(Sweden) Anton Marklund	(United States) Tanner Foust	(Latvia) Reinis Nitišs	(United States) Tanner Foust	(United States) Tanner Foust	
2020	(Sweden) Johan Kristoffersson	(Sweden) Johan Kristoffersson	(Sweden) Johan Kristoffersson	No Q4 (Double-header)	(Sweden) Johan Kristoffersson	(Finland) Juha Rytkönen	(Sweden) Johan Kristoffersson	
2020	(Sweden) Johan Kristoffersson	(Finland) Niclas Grönholm	(Sweden) Johan Kristoffersson	No Q4 (Double-header)	(Sweden) Johan Kristoffersson	(Finland) Niclas Grönholm	(Finland) Niclas Grönholm	
2025	(Sweden) Johan Kristoffersson	(Sweden) Johan Kristoffersson	(Norway) Ole Christian Veiby	(Sweden) Johan Kristoffersson	No semifinals		(Norway) Ole Christian Veiby	
