= World RX of Belgium =

Rallycross event held in Belgium

The World RX of Belgium was a Rallycross event held in Belgium for the FIA World Rallycross Championship. The event made its debut in the 2014 season, at the Circuit Jules Tacheny Mettet in the town of Mettet, Wallonia. From the 2019 season, the event will beheld at Circuit de Spa-Francorchamps and has been renamed the Spa World RX of Benelux.

World RX layout of Circuit Jules Tacheny Mettet, used in 2014-2018

== Past winners ==
Year	Venue	Heat 1 winner	Heat 2 winner	Heat 3 winner	Heat 4 winner	Semi-Final 1 winner	Semi-Final 2 winner	Final winner
2014	Mettet	(Sweden) Anton Marklund	(Sweden) Johan Kristoffersson	(Latvia) Reinis Nitišs	(Sweden) Timmy Hansen	(Sweden) Johan Kristoffersson	(Norway) Petter Solberg	(Finland) Toomas Heikkinen
2015	Mettet	(Sweden) Mattias Ekström	(Sweden) Timmy Hansen	(Sweden) Johan Kristoffersson	(Sweden) Johan Kristoffersson	(Finland) Toomas Heikkinen	(Sweden) Per-Gunnar Andersson	(Finland) Toomas Heikkinen
Year		Qualifying 1 winner	Qualifying 2 winner	Qualifying 3 winner	Qualifying 4 winner	Semi-Final 1 winner	Semi-Final 2 winner	Final winner
2016	Mettet	(France) Sébastien Loeb	(Sweden) Mattias Ekström	(Sweden) Mattias Ekström	(Norway) Petter Solberg	(Sweden) Mattias Ekström	(Norway) Petter Solberg	(Sweden) Mattias Ekström
2017	Mettet	(Norway) Petter Solberg	(Sweden) Johan Kristoffersson	(Sweden) Johan Kristoffersson	(Sweden) Johan Kristoffersson	(Sweden) Timmy Hansen	(Norway) Petter Solberg	(Sweden) Johan Kristoffersson
2018	Mettet	(Norway) Petter Solberg	(Sweden) Mattias Ekström	(Sweden) Timmy Hansen	(Sweden) Mattias Ekström	(Sweden) Johan Kristoffersson	(France) Sébastien Loeb	(France) Sébastien Loeb
