= World RX of Canada =

Rallycross event held in Canada

The World RX of Canada was a Rallycross event held in Canada for the FIA World Rallycross Championship. The event made its debut in the 2014 season, at the Circuit Trois-Rivières in the town of Trois-Rivières, Quebec.

World RX layout of Circuit Trois-Rivières

== Past winners ==
Year	Heat 1 winner	Heat 2 winner	Heat 3 winner	Heat 4 winner	Semi-Final 1 winner	Semi-Final 2 winner	Final winner
2014	(Norway) Petter Solberg	(Finland) Joni Wiman	(Norway) Petter Solberg	(Norway) Petter Solberg	(Norway) Petter Solberg	(Sweden) Anton Marklund	(Norway) Petter Solberg
2015	(Sweden) Timmy Hansen	(Norway) Petter Solberg	(Sweden) Timmy Hansen	(Sweden) Timmy Hansen	(Norway) Tommy Rustad	(France) Davy Jeanney	(France) Davy Jeanney
Year	Qualifying 1 winner	Qualifying 2 winner	Qualifying 3 winner	Qualifying 4 winner	Semi-Final 1 winner	Semi-Final 2 winner	Final winner
2016	(Norway) Petter Solberg	(Norway) Petter Solberg	(Sweden) Johan Kristoffersson	(Norway) Petter Solberg	(Norway) Petter Solberg	(Norway) Andreas Bakkerud	(Sweden) Timmy Hansen
2017	(Finland) Toomas Heikkinen	(Sweden) Johan Kristoffersson	(Norway) Petter Solberg	(Sweden) Johan Kristoffersson	(Sweden) Johan Kristoffersson	(Norway) Petter Solberg	(Sweden) Johan Kristoffersson
2018	(France) Sébastien Loeb	(France) Sébastien Loeb	(Sweden) Johan Kristoffersson	(Sweden) Johan Kristoffersson	(Sweden) Johan Kristoffersson	(Sweden) Timmy Hansen	(Sweden) Johan Kristoffersson
2019	(Norway) Andreas Bakkerud	(Finland) Niclas Grönholm	(Russia) Timur Timerzyanov	(Finland) Niclas Grönholm	(Russia) Timur Timerzyanov	(Norway) Andreas Bakkerud	(Norway) Andreas Bakkerud
