= World RX of Benelux =

Season of motor racing

The World RX of Benelux was a Rallycross event held in Belgium for the FIA World Rallycross Championship. The event made its debut in the 2019 season, at the Circuit de Spa-Francorchamps and replaced World RX of Belgium event at the Circuit Jules Tacheny Mettet in the town of Mettet, Wallonia.

World RX of Benelux layout at the Circuit de Spa-Francorchamps, used from 2019

== Past winners ==
| Year | Venue | Heat 1 winner | Heat 2 winner | Heat 3 winner | Heat 4 winner | Semi-Final 1 winner | Semi-Final 2 winner | Final winner |
|---|---|---|---|---|---|---|---|---|
| 2019 | Spa | (Norway) Andreas Bakkerud | (United Kingdom) Liam Doran | (Norway) Andreas Bakkerud | (Sweden) Timmy Hansen | (Norway) Andreas Bakkerud | (Finland) Joni Wiman | (Russia) Timur Timerzyanov |
| 2020 | Spa | Cancelled due to the COVID-19 pandemic | | | | | | |
| 2021 | Spa | (Netherlands) Kevin Abbring | (Sweden) Johan Kristoffersson | (Finland) Niclas Grönholm | (Netherlands) Kevin Abbring | (Sweden) Kevin Hansen | (Sweden) Johan Kristoffersson | (Sweden) Johan Kristoffersson |
| Year | Venue | Heat 1 winner | Heat 2 winner | Heat 3 winner | Progression best time | Semi-Final 1 winner | Semi-Final 2 winner | Final winner |
| 2022 | Spa | (Finland) Niclas Grönholm | (Sweden) Timmy Hansen | No Q3 (Double Header) | (Sweden) Timmy Hansen | (Sweden) Timmy Hansen | (Finland) Niclas Grönholm | (Sweden) Johan Kristoffersson |
| 2022 | Spa | (Sweden) Timmy Hansen | (Sweden) Johan Kristoffersson | No Q3 (Double Header) | (Sweden) Timmy Hansen | (Finland) Niclas Grönholm | (Sweden) Johan Kristoffersson | (Sweden) Johan Kristoffersson |
| 2024 | Spa | (Sweden) Johan Kristoffersson | (France) Anthony Pelfrene | (Sweden) Kevin Hansen | (Sweden) Johan Kristoffersson | (Sweden) Kevin Hansen | (Sweden) Timmy Hansen | (Sweden) Timmy Hansen |
| 2024 | Spa | (Sweden) Johan Kristoffersson | (Finland) Niclas Grönholm | (Finland) Niclas Grönholm | (Sweden) Johan Kristoffersson | (Sweden) Johan Kristoffersson | (Finland) Niclas Grönholm | (Sweden) Johan Kristoffersson |
