= World RX of Turkey =

Rallycross event held in Turkey

The World RX of Turkey was a rallycross event held in Turkey for the FIA World Rallycross Championship. The event made its debut in the 2014 season, at the Istanbul Park rallycross circuit in Tuzla, in Istanbul.

World RX layout of Istanbul Park, used in 2014–2015 and 2024–2025

== Past winners ==
Year	Heat 1 winner	Heat 2 winner	Heat 3 winner	Heat 4 winner	Semi-Final 1 winner	Semi-Final 2 winner	Final winner
2014	(Finland) Toomas Heikkinen	(Sweden) Timmy Hansen	(Sweden) Timmy Hansen	(Sweden) Timmy Hansen	(Sweden) Timmy Hansen	(Finland) Toomas Heikkinen	(Norway) Andreas Bakkerud
2015	(Sweden) Timmy Hansen	(Sweden) Mattias Ekström	(Sweden) Mattias Ekström	(Sweden) Mattias Ekström	(Norway) Andreas Bakkerud	(Sweden) Timmy Hansen	(Sweden) Timmy Hansen
2024	(Finland) Niclas Grönholm	(United Kingdom) Patrick O'Donovan	(France) Steven Bossard	(Sweden) Johan Kristoffersson	(Norway) Ole Christian Veiby	(Sweden) Kevin Hansen	(Norway) Ole Christian Veiby
2024	(Sweden) Johan Kristoffersson	(Finland) Juha Rytkönen	(United Kingdom) Patrick O'Donovan	(Norway) Ole Christian Veiby	(Norway) Ole Christian Veiby	(Finland) Juha Rytkönen	(Finland) Juha Rytkönen
2025	(Finland) Niclas Grönholm	(Finland) Niclas Grönholm	(Finland) Niclas Grönholm				(Sweden) Johan Kristoffersson
2025	(Sweden) Johan Kristoffersson	(Norway) Ole Christian Veiby	(Norway) Ole Christian Veiby		(Norway) Ole Christian Veiby	(Sweden) Johan Kristoffersson	(Norway) Ole Christian Veiby
