= Circuit Jules Tacheny Mettet =

Racing circuit in Wallonia, Belgium

- Modern Circuit (2010–present)
- Location: Mettet, Belgium
- Coordinates: 50°18′14.51″N 4°39′27″E
- Operator: Royal Union Motor Entre Sambre et Meuse
- Opened: 1927 (as original circuit); 12 March 2010; 16 years ago (as modern circuit)
- Major events: Former: FIA World Rallycross Championship; World RX of Belgium (2014–2018); World RX of Benelux (2024); FIA European Rallycross Championship; Euro RX of Belgium (2014–2018); Euro RX of Benelux (2023–present); TCR Benelux Series (2016–2017); Formula 750 (1975)

Modern Car Circuit (2010–present)
- Length: 2.310 km (1.435 mi)
- Turns: 10
- Race lap record: 1:05.252 ( (Hungary) Norbert Michelisz, Honda Civic Type R TCR (FK2), 2016, TCR)

Modern Bike Circuit (2010–present)
- Length: 2.280 km (1.417 mi)
- Turns: 11

Grand Prix Circuit (1949–1961)
- Length: 8.368 km (5.200 mi)
- Turns: 8
- Race lap record: 3:17.000 ( (Italy) Alberto Ascari, Ferrari 166 F2, 1950, F2)

Grand Prix Circuit (1932–1948)
- Length: 8.500 km (5.282 mi)
- Turns: 8

Original St. Donat Circuit (1927–1948)
- Length: 2.800 km (1.740 mi)
- Turns: 5
- Race lap record: Bastien Bultot

The Circuit Jules Tacheny Mettet is a 2.310 km (1.435 mi) motorsport racing circuit in Mettet, Wallonia (Belgium), 20 km (12 mi) southeast of Charleroi. The circuit was finalized in 2010 near the old street circuit.

== History ==
=== Motorcycle racing ===
During the early 1920s motorcycle racers started to race around a circuit composed of local streets surrounding the Belgian city of Mettet. The first motorcycle Grand Prix Entre Sambre et Meuse was held in 1928. Belgian driver Albert Breslau won the first race on an AJS. The last edition of the original motorcycle Grand Prix of Mettet was run in 1937. After World War II Jules Tacheny was appointed president of the Royal Motor Union de l’Entre Sambre et Meuse (RMUESM). Tacheny won the Senior category of the first post-war version of the Grand Prix in 1946. The overall Grand Prix was won by Roger Laurent on a Norton.

In 1947 the FIM motorcycle racing governing body decided each country could only host one Grand Prix. Therefore, the title Belgian motorcycle Grand Prix was awarded to the race at Spa-Francorchamps. The race at Mettet was renamed Circuit de l'Entre Sambre et Meuse in 1947 and the race was again renamed to "Grand Trophy". Legendary motor and auto racing driver John Surtees won the race in 1958 in the 350cc and 500cc classes.

Between 1972 and 1979 the street circuit hosted the Mettet 1000 km motorcycle endurance race. Jean-Claude Chemarin was the most successful rider of the Mettet endurance race, winning the event four times. The circuit also hosted the Belgian round of the 1975 Formula 750 championship won by Patrick Pons. The street circuit was last used in 2006.

World RX layout of Circuit Jules Tacheny Mettet, used in 2014–2018 and 2024

=== Formula 2 ===
The RMUESM hosted non-championship Formula Two races twice, in 1950 and 1951. In 1950 the first edition Grandee Trophée Entre Sambre et Meuse was held at the 7.387 km (4.590 mi) street circuit. Of the 24 competitors only ten drivers made it to the finish. Robert Manzon won the final race in his factory entered Simca Gordini Type 15. Stirling Moss and Lance Macklin finished second and third in for HW Motors. The second edition of the Grandee Trophée was again won by Manzon. Gordini completed the podium with factory drivers André Simon and Maurice Trintignant finishing second and third.

=== Development of the new circuit ===
The new 2.310 km (1.435 mi) permanent circuit was opened on 12 March 2010. In the initial years Mettet was mostly used by motorcycle racers. The track was first used in the FIA European Rallycross Championship and FIA World Rallycross Championship in 2014.

== Lap records ==
As of October 2016, the fastest official race lap records of the Circuit Jules Tacheny Mettet are listed as:

Category	Time	Driver	Vehicle	Event
Modern Car Circuit (2010–present): 2.310 km (1.435 mi)
TCR Touring Car	1:05.252	Norbert Michelisz	Honda Civic Type R TCR (FK2)	2016 Mettet TCR Benelux round
Grand Prix Circuit (1949–1961): 8.368 km (5.200 mi)
Formula Two	3:17.000	Alberto Ascari	Ferrari 166 F2	1950 Grandee Trophee Entre Sambre Et Meuse

== Motorcycle Grand Prix ==
Year	Winner
500cc
1928	(Belgium) Albert Breslau
1929	(Belgium) Marcel Debay
1930	(Belgium) René De Keyser
1931	(Belgium) Pol Demeuter
1932	(Belgium) Robert Grégoire
1933	(Belgium) Pol Demeuter
1934	(Belgium) Pol Demeuter
1935	(Belgium) "Grizzly"
1936	(Belgium) René Milhoux
1937	(Belgium) "Grizzly"
1946	(Belgium) Roger Laurent
1947	(United Kingdom) Fergus Anderson
1948	(United Kingdom) David Whitworth
1949	(Belgium) Auguste Goffin
1950	(Italy) Enrico Lorenzetti
1951	(United Kingdom) Geoffrey Duke
1952	(New Zealand) Rod Coleman
1953	(United Kingdom) Leslie Graham
1954	(United Kingdom) Fergus Anderson
1955	(United Kingdom) Fergus Anderson
1956	(United Kingdom) John Surtees
1957	(United Kingdom) Dickie Dale
1958	(United Kingdom) John Surtees
1959	(Australia) Tom Phillis
1960	(United Kingdom) Dickie Dale
1961 edition canceled
1962	(Italy) Silvio Grassetti
1963 edition canceled
1964	(Sweden) Bror Erland Carlsson
1965 edition canceled
1966	(United Kingdom) Chris Conn
1967	(United Kingdom) John Blanchard
1968 edition canceled
1969	(New Zealand) Keith Turner
1970	(France) Gérard Debrock
1971	(United Kingdom) Dave Simmonds
+500cc
1972	(Switzerland) Gilbert Argo
1973	(Belgium) Oronzo Memola
1974	(Australia) John Dodds
1975	(France) Patrick Pons
1976	(Italy) Giacomo Agostini
1977	(Italy) Giacomo Agostini
1978	(France) Michel Rougerie
500cc
1979	(South Africa) Alan North
1980	(Belgium) Alain Nies
+500cc
1981	(United States) Mike Baldwin
1982	(Belgium) Patric Orban
1983	(Belgium) Dieter Heinen
Supercup
1984	(Belgium) Michel Siméon
1985	(Belgium) Leslie Simoens
1986	(Belgium) Patric Orban
Open
1987	(Belgium) Michel Siméon
1988	(Belgium) Paul Ramon
Superbike
1989	(Belgium) Stéphane Mertens
Open
1990	(Belgium) Michel Simul
1991	(Belgium) Michel Simul
1992	(Belgium) Stéphane Mertens
1993	(Belgium) Michel Simul
Superbike
1994	(Belgium) Alain Kempener
Stocksport
1995	(Belgium) Alain Kempener
Supersports
1996	(Belgium) Alain Kempener
1997	(Belgium) Louis Wuyts
1998	(Belgium) Michaël Paquay
1999	(Belgium) Louis Wuyts
2000	(Belgium) Wim van Achter
2001	(Belgium) Sébastien Le Grelle
2002	(Belgium) Yvan Batens
2003	(Belgium) Sébastien Le Grelle
2004	(Belgium) Tom Vanlandschoot
2005	(Belgium) Sébastien Le Grelle
2005	(Belgium) Marc Fissette
Superbike
2006	(Belgium) Stéphane Mertens
2006	(Belgium) Stéphane Mertens
2010	(Belgium) Grégory Fastry
2010	(Belgium) Grégory Fastry

== Formula 2 results ==
Year	Heat 1	Heat 2	Final
1950	(Italy) Alberto Ascari	(United Kingdom) Stirling Moss	(France) Robert Manzon
1951	not contested	not contested	(France) Robert Manzon

== FIA World Rallycross Championship ==
Season	Date	Driver	Car	Report
2014	12–13 July	(Finland) Toomas Heikkinen	Volkswagen Polo	report
2015	16–17 May	(Finland) Toomas Heikkinen	Volkswagen Polo	report
2016	14–15 May	(Sweden) Mattias Ekström	Audi S1	report
2017	13–14 May	(Sweden) Johan Kristoffersson	Volkswagen Polo GTI	report
2018	11–13 May	(France) Sébastien Loeb	Peugeot 208	report

Since 2019 the World RX of Belgium was renamed Spa World RX of Benelux and takes place at Circuit de Spa-Francorchamps.
