= World RX of Sweden =

Swedish Rallycross Championship

The World RX of Sweden was a Rallycross event held in Sweden for the FIA World Rallycross Championship. The event made its debut in the 2014 season, at the Höljesbanan circuit in the village of Höljes.

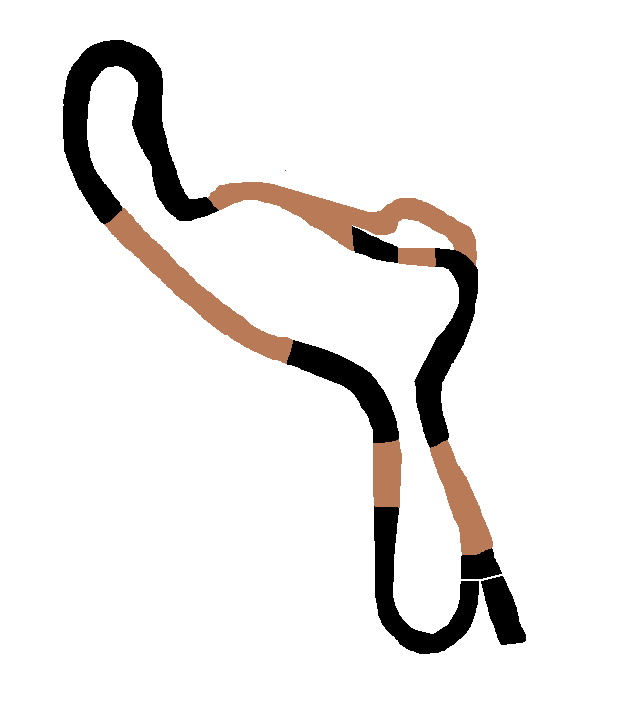
World RX layout of Höljesbanan

== Past winners ==
| Year | Heat 1 winner | Heat 2 winner | Heat 3 winner | Heat 4 winner | Semi-Final 1 winner | Semi-Final 2 winner | Final winner |
|---|---|---|---|---|---|---|---|
| 2014 | (Norway) Petter Solberg | (Russia) Timur Timerzyanov | (Norway) Petter Solberg | (Sweden) Mattias Ekström | (Sweden) Mattias Ekström | (Sweden) Sebastian Eriksson | (Sweden) Mattias Ekström |
| 2015 | (Sweden) Timmy Hansen | (Norway) Andreas Bakkerud | (Norway) Petter Solberg | (Norway) Petter Solberg | (Sweden) Timmy Hansen | (Norway) Andreas Bakkerud | (Sweden) Mattias Ekström |
| Year | Qualifying 1 winner | Qualifying 2 winner | Qualifying 3 winner | Qualifying 4 winner | Semi-Final 1 winner | Semi-Final 2 winner | Final winner |
| 2016 | (France) Sébastien Loeb | (Sweden) Johan Kristoffersson | (Norway) Petter Solberg | (Norway) Andreas Bakkerud | (Sweden) Timmy Hansen | (Norway) Andreas Bakkerud | (Norway) Andreas Bakkerud |
| 2017 | (France) Sébastien Loeb | (Sweden) Johan Kristoffersson | (Sweden) Johan Kristoffersson | (Norway) Petter Solberg | (Sweden) Johan Kristoffersson | (Norway) Andreas Bakkerud | (Sweden) Johan Kristoffersson |
| 2018 | (Sweden) Johan Kristoffersson | (Sweden) Johan Kristoffersson | (Norway) Petter Solberg | (Sweden) Johan Kristoffersson | (Sweden) Johan Kristoffersson | (Norway) Andreas Bakkerud | (Sweden) Johan Kristoffersson |
| 2019 | (Norway) Andreas Bakkerud | (Latvia) Reinis Nitiss | (Norway) Andreas Bakkerud | (Sweden) Sebastian Eriksson | (Sweden) Kevin Hansen | (Sweden) Sebastian Eriksson | (Sweden) Sebastian Eriksson |
| 2020 | (Sweden) Johan Kristoffersson | (Sweden) Mattias Ekström | (Sweden) Johan Kristoffersson | No Q4 (Double header) | (Sweden) Johan Kristoffersson | (Sweden) Mattias Ekström | (Sweden) Johan Kristoffersson |
| 2020 | (Sweden) Johan Kristoffersson | (Sweden) Mattias Ekström | (Sweden) Johan Kristoffersson | No Q4 (Double header) | (Sweden) Johan Kristoffersson | (Sweden) Robin Larsson | (Sweden) Mattias Ekström |
| 2021 | (Sweden) Johan Kristoffersson | (Sweden) Timmy Hansen | (Netherlands) Kevin Abbring | (Sweden) Johan Kristoffersson | (Sweden) Timmy Hansen | (Sweden) Kevin Hansen | (Sweden) Timmy Hansen |
| 2023 | (Sweden) Johan Kristoffersson | (Sweden) Johan Kristoffersson | (Sweden) Johan Kristoffersson | (Sweden) Johan Kristoffersson | (Sweden) Johan Kristoffersson | (Sweden) Kevin Hansen | (Sweden) Johan Kristoffersson |
| 2024 | (Sweden) Johan Kristoffersson | (Sweden) Klara Andersson | (Sweden) Klara Andersson | (Sweden) Timmy Hansen | (Sweden) Klara Andersson | (Sweden) Johan Kristoffersson | (Sweden) Johan Kristoffersson |
| 2024 | (Sweden) Johan Kristoffersson | (Sweden) Kevin Hansen | (Norway) Sondre Evjen | (Sweden) Johan Kristoffersson | (Sweden) Johan Kristoffersson | (Finland) Niclas Grönholm | (Sweden) Johan Kristoffersson |
| 2025 | (Sweden) Johan Kristoffersson | (Sweden) Johan Kristoffersson | (Sweden) Johan Kristoffersson | (Sweden) Johan Kristoffersson | (Sweden) Johan Kristoffersson | (Finland) Niclas Grönholm | (Sweden) Johan Kristoffersson |
