= Höljes =

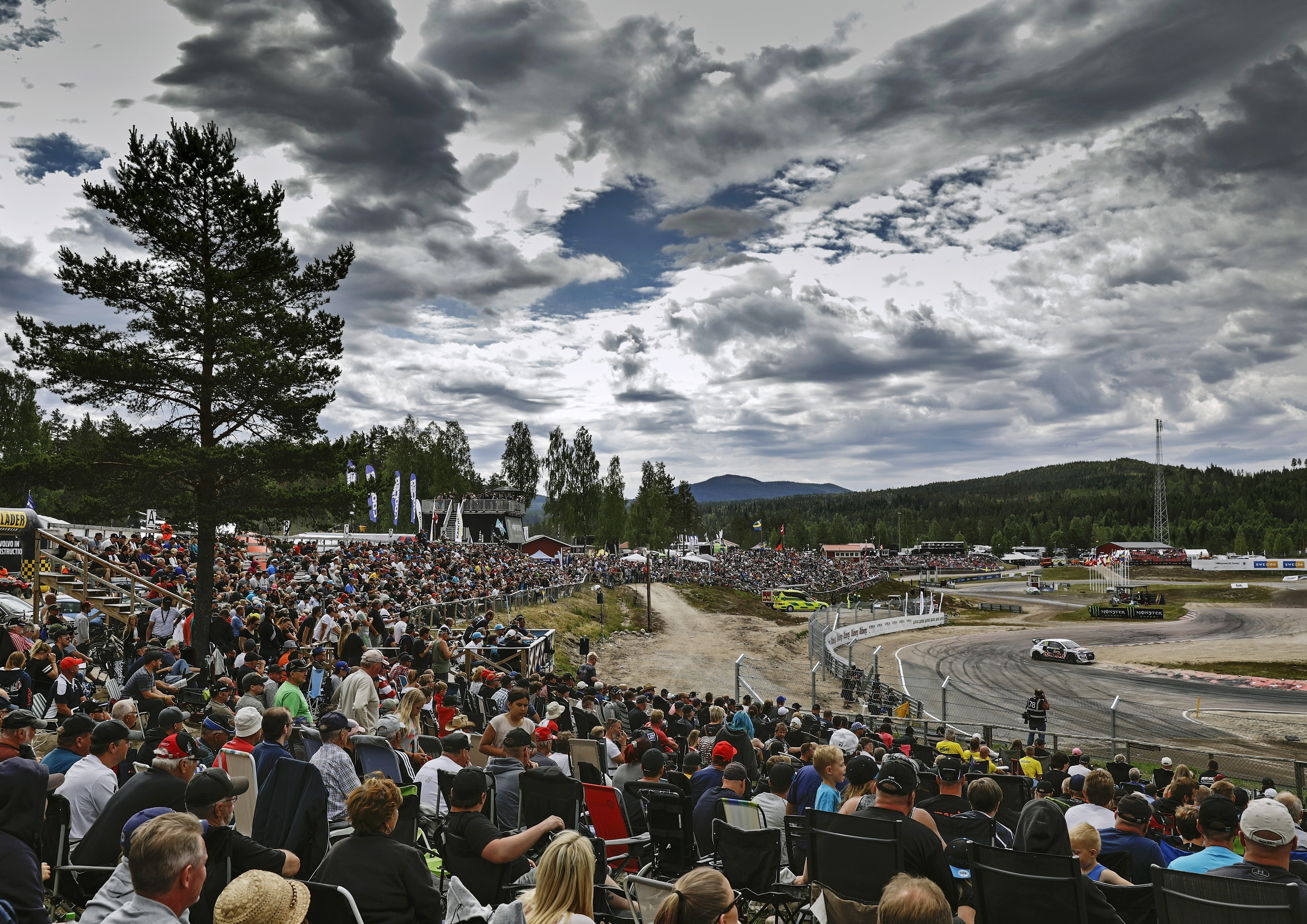
- Rallycross 2017 in Höljesbanan

- Location within Värmland County Location within Sweden
- Coordinates: 60°54′13″N 12°35′24″E
- Country: Sweden
- Province: Värmland
- County: Värmland County
- Municipality: Torsby Municipality

Population (2015)
  - Total: 79
- Time zone: UTC+1 (CET)
  - Summer (DST): UTC+2 (CEST)

Höljes is a minor locality situated in Torsby Municipality, Värmland County, Sweden with 79 inhabitants in 2015.

== History ==
The earliest farm in the area that later became Norra Finnskoga parish is Höljes. Erik Fernow's description of Värmland, Beskrivning öfwer Wermeland (1773 - 79), tells that there was only one inhabitant in northern Värmland during the 14th century and he lived in Höljes. His closest neighbor lived 150 km from him in Gräs in Sunnemo. The farm that Fernow is referring to is probably Gammalgården.

Another recorder believes that well into the 16th century there was only one village in Norra Finnskoga, and it was Höljes, located where the Klarälven makes an islet-adorned extension called Höljessjön.

== Geography ==
Höljes is located in the northernmost region of its province and county, about 107 kilometres (66 mi) by road north of municipal centre Torsby. It is very isolated from any other settlements in Värmland and is in one of the most sparsely populated areas of Sweden. Höljes is situated at the southernmost edge of the Swedish portion of the Scandinavian Mountains, which is manifested in the Sälen ski resort being less than 40 kilometres (25 mi) away by terrain. Höljes was originally the northernmost village of Sweden's southern region Götaland, before Värmland was declared part of Svealand in 1815. It still remains the northernmost locality in Värmland and is further north than Gävle in Sweden's greater northern region.

== Climate ==
Höljes has a climate sitting on the boundary between a subarctic and humid continental climate. Being situated in a valley at 230 m asl, it is the coldest station in Sweden south of the country's portion of the Scandinavian Mountains. As a result of its far inland position, the area has a rather unique climate by Swedish standards. Winters are as cold as in Skellefteå some four degrees north in the coastal region, but due to the absence of seasonal lag, the winter is front-loaded. This renders December to be colder than February. In the summer half of the year, temperatures are very dependent on the relative sun strength due to the lack of maritime moderation. As a result, April is similar to October in terms of general means and a lot of the warmest weather occurs early in summer. Even so, the all-time heat record was set in August 1975 when the village hit 34.4 °C (93.9 °F). The all-time cold record is −40.5 °C (−40.9 °F).

Due to the frost hollow aspects of its topography, Höljes has received frosts in every single month of the year. Even so, due to climate change summer frosts have become rarer events although those sometimes occur. The annual low temperature is averaging below freezing and the diurnal temperature variation is strong for most of the year.

Höljes maintains a sizeable snow pack in winter similar to the mountains and lower areas to its north. It also receives quite high precipitation levels by Swedish standards.

Climate data for Höljes (2002–2020 averages; extremes since 1960)
Month	Jan	Feb	Mar	Apr	May	Jun	Jul	Aug	Sep	Oct	Nov	Dec	Year
Record high °C (°F)	7.9 (46.2)	11.3 (52.3)	16.9 (62.4)	24.7 (76.5)	29.4 (84.9)	32.6 (90.7)	32.7 (90.9)	34.4 (93.9)	24.6 (76.3)	20.0 (68.0)	14.3 (57.7)	9.7 (49.5)	34.4 (93.9)
Mean maximum °C (°F)	4.0 (39.2)	5.1 (41.2)	11.5 (52.7)	18.0 (64.4)	24.9 (76.8)	27.4 (81.3)	29.0 (84.2)	26.9 (80.4)	21.3 (70.3)	15.0 (59.0)	9.3 (48.7)	4.6 (40.3)	30.3 (86.5)
Mean daily maximum °C (°F)	−4.2 (24.4)	−1.6 (29.1)	4.1 (39.4)	10.5 (50.9)	15.9 (60.6)	20.4 (68.7)	22.5 (72.5)	20.4 (68.7)	15.5 (59.9)	7.8 (46.0)	1.6 (34.9)	−3.2 (26.2)	9.1 (48.4)
Daily mean °C (°F)	−7.9 (17.8)	−6.2 (20.8)	−1.8 (28.8)	3.9 (39.0)	9.1 (48.4)	13.5 (56.3)	16.0 (60.8)	14.5 (58.1)	10.1 (50.2)	3.8 (38.8)	−1.5 (29.3)	−6.7 (19.9)	3.9 (39.0)
Mean daily minimum °C (°F)	−11.5 (11.3)	−10.7 (12.7)	−7.7 (18.1)	−2.8 (27.0)	2.3 (36.1)	6.6 (43.9)	9.5 (49.1)	8.6 (47.5)	4.7 (40.5)	−0.3 (31.5)	−4.5 (23.9)	−10.1 (13.8)	−1.3 (29.6)
Mean minimum °C (°F)	−25.3 (−13.5)	−24.9 (−12.8)	−20.2 (−4.4)	−10.2 (13.6)	−5.1 (22.8)	−0.4 (31.3)	2.8 (37.0)	0.8 (33.4)	−3.2 (26.2)	−9.0 (15.8)	−16.3 (2.7)	−22.9 (−9.2)	−28.7 (−19.7)
Record low °C (°F)	−40.5 (−40.9)	−38.0 (−36.4)	−33.4 (−28.1)	−22.7 (−8.9)	−9.0 (15.8)	−5.2 (22.6)	−2.0 (28.4)	−3.9 (25.0)	−8.5 (16.7)	−22.2 (−8.0)	−29.5 (−21.1)	−36.6 (−33.9)	−40.5 (−40.9)
Average precipitation mm (inches)	51.5 (2.03)	36.5 (1.44)	26.9 (1.06)	31.9 (1.26)	72.8 (2.87)	73.1 (2.88)	83.4 (3.28)	95.9 (3.78)	67.0 (2.64)	67.3 (2.65)	65.3 (2.57)	54.6 (2.15)	726.2 (28.61)
Average extreme snow depth cm (inches)	37 (15)	45 (18)	46 (18)	23 (9.1)	0 (0)	0 (0)	0 (0)	0 (0)	0 (0)	4 (1.6)	10 (3.9)	24 (9.4)	50 (20)
Source 1: SMHI Open Data
Source 2: SMHI Open Data

== Sport ==
In the first weekend in July every year, the World RX of Sweden in the FIA World Rallycross Championship takes place in Höljesbanan, with large audience figures. Höljes, with its approximately 80 inhabitants (2015 the number was 79), is growing to Värmland's second most populous town. More than 35,000 people usually visit Höljes this weekend and follow the event on site.

At the 2015 event, a new audience record was broken, with 39,800 visitors. In 2017, it was a new record, with 45,000 visitors. In 2018, it was again a new audience record, with 51,600 visitors.
