= List of accolades received by Dances With Wolves =

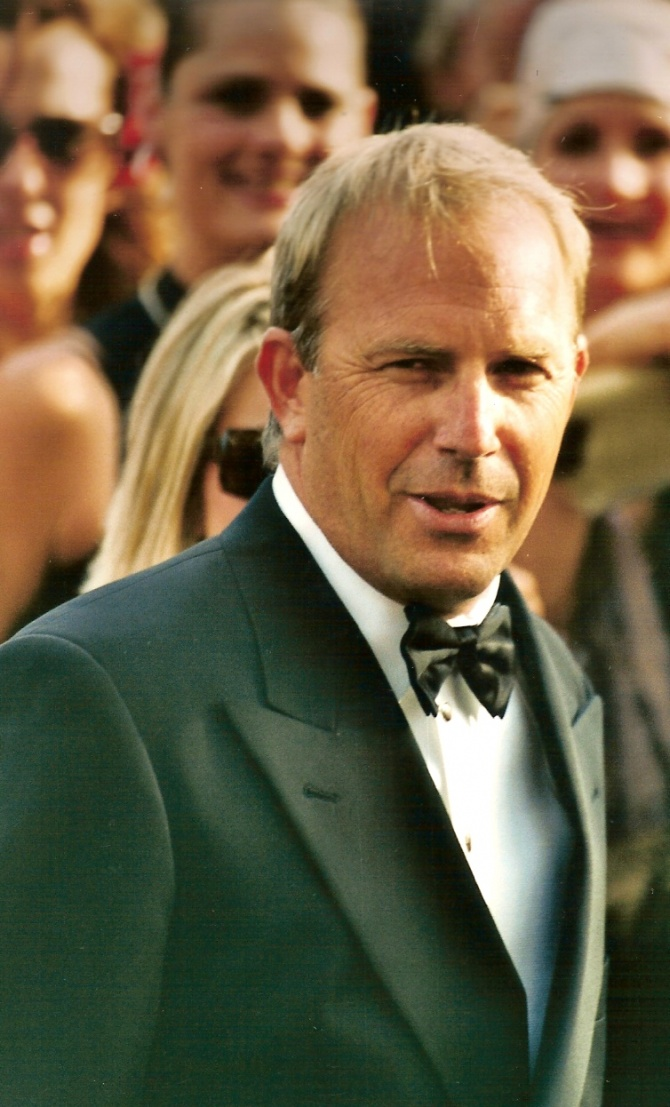
- Kevin Costner received many awards and nominations for his directing and acting, including the Academy Award for Best Director.
Accolades
Award	Won	Nominated
Academy Awards	7	12
American Cinema Editors	1	1
American Society of Cinematographers	1	1
Japan Academy Prize	1	1
British Academy Film Awards	0	9
BMI Awards	1	1
Berlin International Film Festival	1	1
British Society of Cinematographers	0	1
Casting Society of America	1	1
Chicago Film Critics Association	1	4
César Awards	0	1
David di Donatello	0	2
Directors Guild of America Awards	1	1
Environmental Media Awards	1	1
Goldene Kamera	1	1
Golden Globe Awards	3	6
Grammy Awards	1	1
Independent Spirit Awards	1	1
Kinema Junpo Awards	2	2
Los Angeles Film Critics Association	3	3
Mainichi Film Awards	1	1
National Board of Review	3	3
National Film Preservation Board	1	1
Nikkan Sports Film Awards	1	1
Producers Guild of America Awards	1	1
Political Film Society	1	1
USC Scripter Awards	0	1
Bronze Wrangler	1	1
Spur Awards	1	1
Writers Guild of America Awards	1	1
Young Artist Awards	1	1
- Total number of awards and nominations (Note: Certain award groups do not simply award one winner. They recognize several different recipients and have runners-up. Since this is a specific recognition and is different from losing an award, runner-up mentions are considered wins in this award tally.)
Totals	38	64
- Footnotes

Dances With Wolves is an American epic Western war film directed by and starring Kevin Costner, who co-produced the film with Jim Wilson. The screenplay was written by Michael Blake as an adaptation of his 1988 novel of the same name. The film focuses on a Union Army lieutenant (Costner), who travels to a military post on the American frontier, before meeting a group of Lakota Sioux, with whose culture he becomes fascinated. The film features Mary McDonnell, Graham Greene, and Rodney A. Grant in supporting roles.

The film received its world premiere at the Uptown Theater in Washington, D.C., on October 19, 1990. Orion Pictures gave the film a limited release on November 9, 1990 before a wide release on November 23, 1990. The film grossed over $424 million worldwide on an estimated $22 million budget, becoming the highest-grossing Western of all time. Review aggregator Rotten Tomatoes surveyed 66 reviews and judged 83% of them to be positive.

Dances With Wolves received awards and nominations in a variety of categories, with praise particularly going to Costner's direction, the lead and supporting acting performances, and the screenplay by Michael Blake as well as the film's cinematography, musical score, and editing. It was nominated for twelve awards at the 63rd Academy Awards, winning seven, including the Academy Award for Best Picture, Best Director, and Best Adapted Screenplay, in addition to a variety of technical awards. At the 48th Golden Globe Awards, Dances With Wolves received six nominations, winning three for Best Motion Picture – Drama, Best Director, and Best Screenplay.

The film garnered nine nominations for the 45th British Academy Film Awards, including Best Film; However, it did not win in any categories. It was also awarded by other organizations: Costner received a Silver Bear at the Berlin International Film Festival, while the film received the National Board of Review Award for Best Film, Best Theatrical Motion Picture from the Producers Guild of America, and Best Adapted Screenplay from the Writers Guild of America.

== Accolades ==
Award	Date of ceremony	Category	Recipient(s) and nominee(s)	Result	Ref(s)
Academy Awards	March 25, 1991	Best Picture	Jim Wilson and Kevin Costner	Won	
Academy Awards	March 25, 1991	Best Director	Kevin Costner	Won	
Academy Awards	March 25, 1991	Best Actor	Kevin Costner	Nominated	
Academy Awards	March 25, 1991	Best Supporting Actor	Graham Greene	Nominated	
Academy Awards	March 25, 1991	Best Supporting Actress	Mary McDonnell	Nominated	
Academy Awards	March 25, 1991	Best Adapted Screenplay	Michael Blake	Won	
Academy Awards	March 25, 1991	Best Art Direction	Jeffrey Beecroft and Lisa Dean	Nominated	
Academy Awards	March 25, 1991	Best Cinematography	Dean Semler	Won	
Academy Awards	March 25, 1991	Best Costume Design	Elsa Zamparelli	Nominated	
Academy Awards	March 25, 1991	Best Film Editing	Neil Travis	Won	
Academy Awards	March 25, 1991	Best Original Score	John Barry	Won	
Academy Awards	March 25, 1991	Best Sound	Russell Williams, Jeffrey Perkins, Bill W. Benton, and Gregory H. Watkins	Won	
American Cinema Editors	January 8, 1991	Best Edited Feature Film	Neil Travis	Won	
American Society of Cinematographers	February 15, 2004	Outstanding Achievement in Cinematography in Theatrical Releases	Dean Semler	Won	
Japan Academy Prize	March 20, 1992	Outstanding Foreign Language Film	Dances With Wolves	Won	
BAFTA Awards	March 22, 1992	Best Film	Jim Wilson and Kevin Costner	Nominated	
BAFTA Awards	March 22, 1992	Best Direction	Kevin Costner	Nominated	
BAFTA Awards	March 22, 1992	Best Actor in a Leading Role	Kevin Costner	Nominated	
BAFTA Awards	March 22, 1992	Best Adapted Screenplay	Michael Blake	Nominated	
BAFTA Awards	March 22, 1992	Best Film Music	John Barry	Nominated	
BAFTA Awards	March 22, 1992	Best Editing	Neil Travis	Nominated	
BAFTA Awards	March 22, 1992	Best Cinematography	Dean Semler	Nominated	
BAFTA Awards	March 22, 1992	Best Makeup and Hair	Francisco X. Pérez	Nominated	
BAFTA Awards	March 22, 1992	Best Sound	Russell Williams, Jeffrey Perkins, Bill W. Benton, and Gregory H. Watkins	Nominated	
BMI Awards	July 23, 1991	Film Music Award	John Barry	Won	
Berlin International Film Festival	February 26, 1991	Silver Bear for Outstanding Single Achievement	Kevin Costner	Won	
British Society of Cinematographers	December 15, 1990	Best Cinematography	Dean Semler	Nominated	
Casting Society of America	January 5, 1991	Best Feature Film Casting – Drama	Elisabeth Leustig	Won	
Chicago Film Critics Association	March 7, 1991	Best Film	Dances With Wolves	Nominated	
Chicago Film Critics Association	March 7, 1991	Best Director	Kevin Costner	Nominated	
Chicago Film Critics Association	March 7, 1991	Best Screenplay	Michael Blake	Nominated	
Chicago Film Critics Association	March 7, 1991	Best Cinematography	Dean Semler	Won	
César Awards	February 22, 1992	Best Foreign Film	Dances With Wolves	Nominated	
David di Donatello	March 10, 1991	Best Foreign Film	Kevin Costner	Nominated	
David di Donatello	March 10, 1991	Best Foreign Actor	Kevin Costner	Nominated	
Directors Guild of America Awards	March 16, 1991	Outstanding Directing – Feature Film	Kevin Costner	Won	
Environmental Media Awards	January 27, 1991	Feature Film	Dances With Wolves	Won	
Goldene Kamera	February 10, 1998	Film–International	Kevin Costner (also for Waterworld and The Postman)	Won	
Golden Globe Awards	January 19, 1991	Best Motion Picture – Drama	Dances With Wolves	Won	
Golden Globe Awards	January 19, 1991	Best Director	Kevin Costner	Won	
Golden Globe Awards	January 19, 1991	Best Actor – Motion Picture Drama	Kevin Costner	Nominated	
Golden Globe Awards	January 19, 1991	Best Supporting Actress – Motion Picture	Mary McDonnell	Nominated	
Golden Globe Awards	January 19, 1991	Best Screenplay	Michael Blake	Won	
Golden Globe Awards	January 19, 1991	Best Original Score	John Barry	Nominated	
Grammy Awards	February 25, 1992	Best Score Soundtrack for Visual Media	John Barry	Won	
Independent Spirit Awards	March 23, 1991	Special Distinction Award	Jim Wilson and Kevin Costner	Won	
Kinema Junpo Awards	March 10, 1992	Best Foreign Language Film	Dances With Wolves	Won	
Kinema Junpo Awards	March 10, 1992	Readers' Choice Award for Best Foreign Language Film	Dances With Wolves	Won	
Los Angeles Film Critics Association	January 16, 1991	Best Film	Dances With Wolves	2nd place	
Los Angeles Film Critics Association	January 16, 1991	Best Director	Kevin Costner	2nd place	
Los Angeles Film Critics Association	January 16, 1991	New Generation Award	Kevin Costner	2nd place	
Mainichi Film Awards	January 3, 1992	Best Foreign Film	Dances With Wolves	Won	
National Board of Review	December 16, 1990	Top Ten Films	Dances With Wolves	Won	
National Board of Review	December 16, 1990	Best Film	Dances With Wolves	Won	
National Board of Review	December 16, 1990	Best Director	Kevin Costner	Won	
National Film Preservation Board	December 27, 2007	Selection for the National Film Registry	Dances With Wolves	Won	
Nikkan Sports Film Awards	November 8, 1992	Best Foreign Film	Dances With Wolves	Won	
Producers Guild of America Awards	March 5, 1991	Best Theatrical Motion Picture	Jim Wilson and Kevin Costner	Won	
Political Film Society	March 26, 1991	Peace	Dances With Wolves	Won	
USC Scripter Award	February 19, 1991	Scripter Award	Michael Blake	Nominated	
Bronze Wrangler	January 11, 1991	Theatrical Motion Picture	Kevin Costner, Jim Wilson, and Rodney A. Grant	Won	
Spur Award	April 5, 1991	Best Motion Picture	Michael Blake	Won	
Writers Guild of America Awards	March 20, 1991	Best Adapted Screenplay	Michael Blake	Won	
Young Artist Awards	January 3, 1991	Most Entertaining Family Youth Motion Picture – Drama	Dances With Wolves	Won	

American Film Institute

- AFI's 100 Years...100 Cheers - #59
