= Yxney =

Part of Østerøya in Sandefjord, Norway

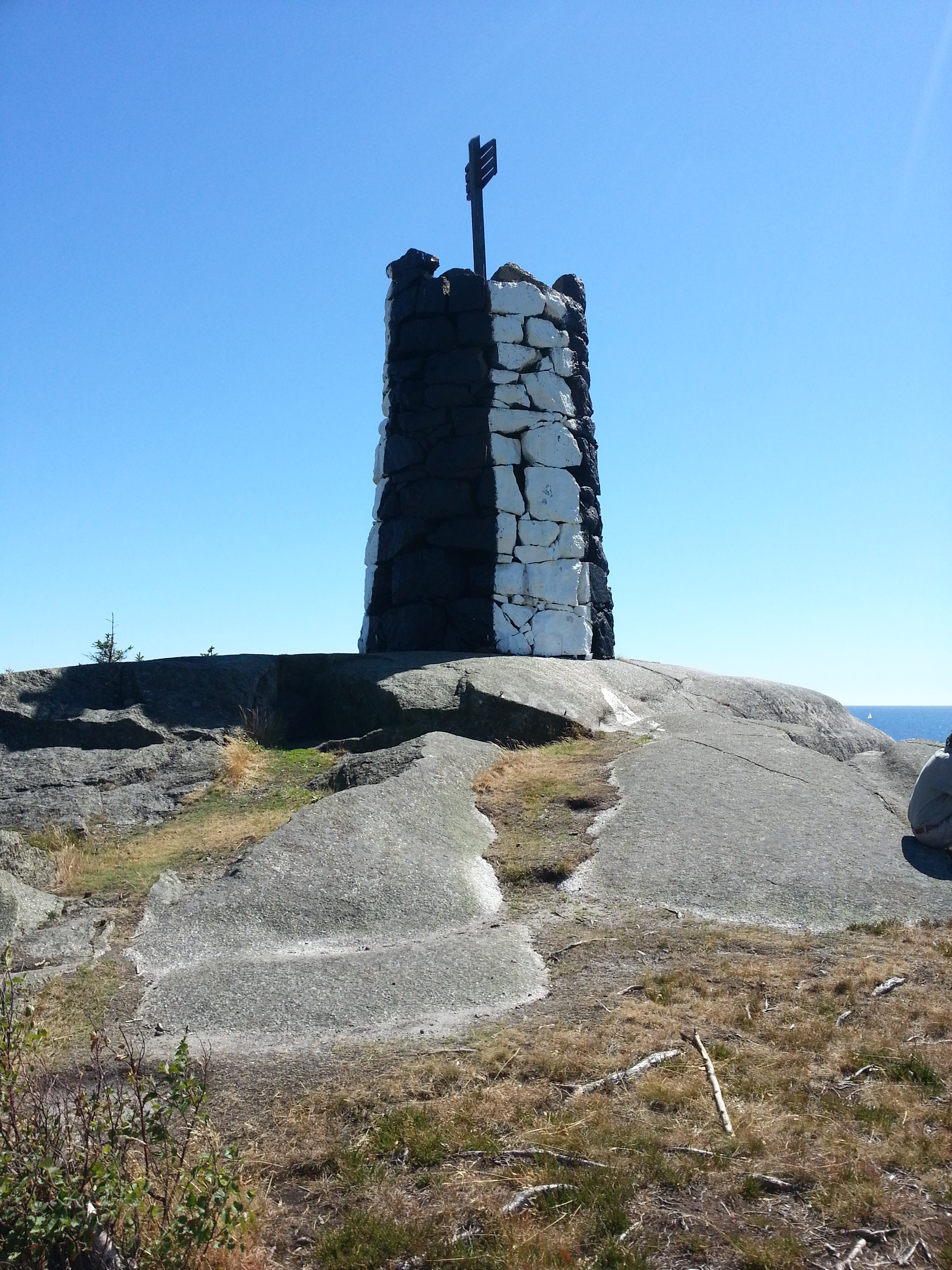
Tønsberg Barrel is located at the southern tip of Yxney.

Yxnøy (also spelled Yxney, formerly: Yxnøyn) is the southernmost part of Østerøya (East Island) in Sandefjord Municipality, Norway. It stretches from Nordre Truber to Ertsvika. It is one of the largest undeveloped areas found along the Vestfold coast. It is a recreational area home to several beaches, steep cliffs, forests, sloping rocks, glacial potholes, hiking trails, and Tønsberg Barrel.

The main trailhead is located at Tallakshavn, which has been named one of the most scenic beaches in the Tønsbergfjorden. There are marked hiking trails from the parking lot to Tønsberg Barrel and various beaches such as Strandvika and Ertsvika. Ertsvika is a sandy beach in the southern part of Yxnøy. This was the filming location for the 1993 film Head Above Water. A theory of this beach's namesake is the plant species Pisum. Another theory is that the beach is named for a species of seal.

There are public toilets at Nordre Truber, Strandvika, Ertsvika, and Engebukta. It is home to a variety of trails, including to Tønsberg Barrel and a variety of beaches. Designated campfire sites are located at Nordre Truber. Islands near Yxnøy include Espeholmen, which as an elevation of 20 meters above sea-level and lies in the Mefjord outside Yxnøy. Teistholmen, Terneskjær and Torsholmen are three other nearby islands.

Yxnøy is home to varied wildlife and a number of rare plant species. A 9 km trail from Yxnøy leads to the beach Skjellvika. It is part of the international North Sea Trail.

== History ==
Parts of southern Østerøya, the Skogan farm, was purchased by Christen Christensen in 1899, and the Christensen family has since owned parts of Yxnøy. The first property was purchased by Christen Christensen from Anders Kristian Hansen in 1899. The property was expanded in 1933 to 1,600 decares (1.6 km^{2}; 0.62 sq mi) and was now the largest property in Sandar Municipality. From 1961, the owner of Yxnøy was Lars Christensen. The area was now also beginning to take shape as a nature park.

Yxnøy and the area surrounding Tønsberg Barrel were fortified by the German occupation forces during World War II. Bunkers, trenches, and other remains from the occupation can still be seen at Yxney. Numerous ships have sunk near the seamark, including ships such as Wilhelm Tell in 1851 and Bjørgvin in 1961, which lies 70 meters from Tønsberg Barrel. In 1907, the ship Union sunk here and its crew of eight men drowned.

Skogan farm is now privately owned by Kjell Christian Ulrichsen who purchased the property in 1994 for NOK 31.8 million.

According to an editorial by Sandefjords Blad on July 5, 1986, Yxnøy would have likely been developed into a residential area had it not been owned by the Christensen family who could afford to leave the area undeveloped.

== Strandvika Nature Preserve ==
Strandvika is a nature preserve and protected beach. A protected coastal riparian forest is found here along with slopingrocks (svaberg) and adjacent farmland. The nature preserve was established by royal resolution on June 13, 1980, in accordance with the Nature Conservation Act. The purpose of the preservation is to protect the black alder swamp forest with its rich flora with species such as Allium ursinum, Filipendula ulmaria, and Orchis mascula. It is illegal to pick or remove plants or plant parts in the preserve, which is marked by signs and green marks on nearby trees. It is the only place in Norway where Valeriana dioica occurs.

== Tønsberg Tønne ==
Tønsberg Barrel ("Tønsberg Tønne") is a 5-meter (16 ft.) tall old beacon mentioned in Sverris saga from around year 1200. Many ships have sunk near the landmark, which is located at the southern tip of East Island. The seamark (navigation mark) sits on the mountain Tønneberget (Stenbåken) with ocean views in all directions. It has an elevation of 37 meters (121 ft.) and marks the entry point for the city of Tønsberg. Its circumference is at its most 12 meters (39 ft.), and it is painted in white and black. The beacon originally consisted of a barrel, hence the name, but was replaced with the current seamark in 1900.
