= Østerøya =

Peninsula in Sandefjord Municipality, Norway

- Peninsula
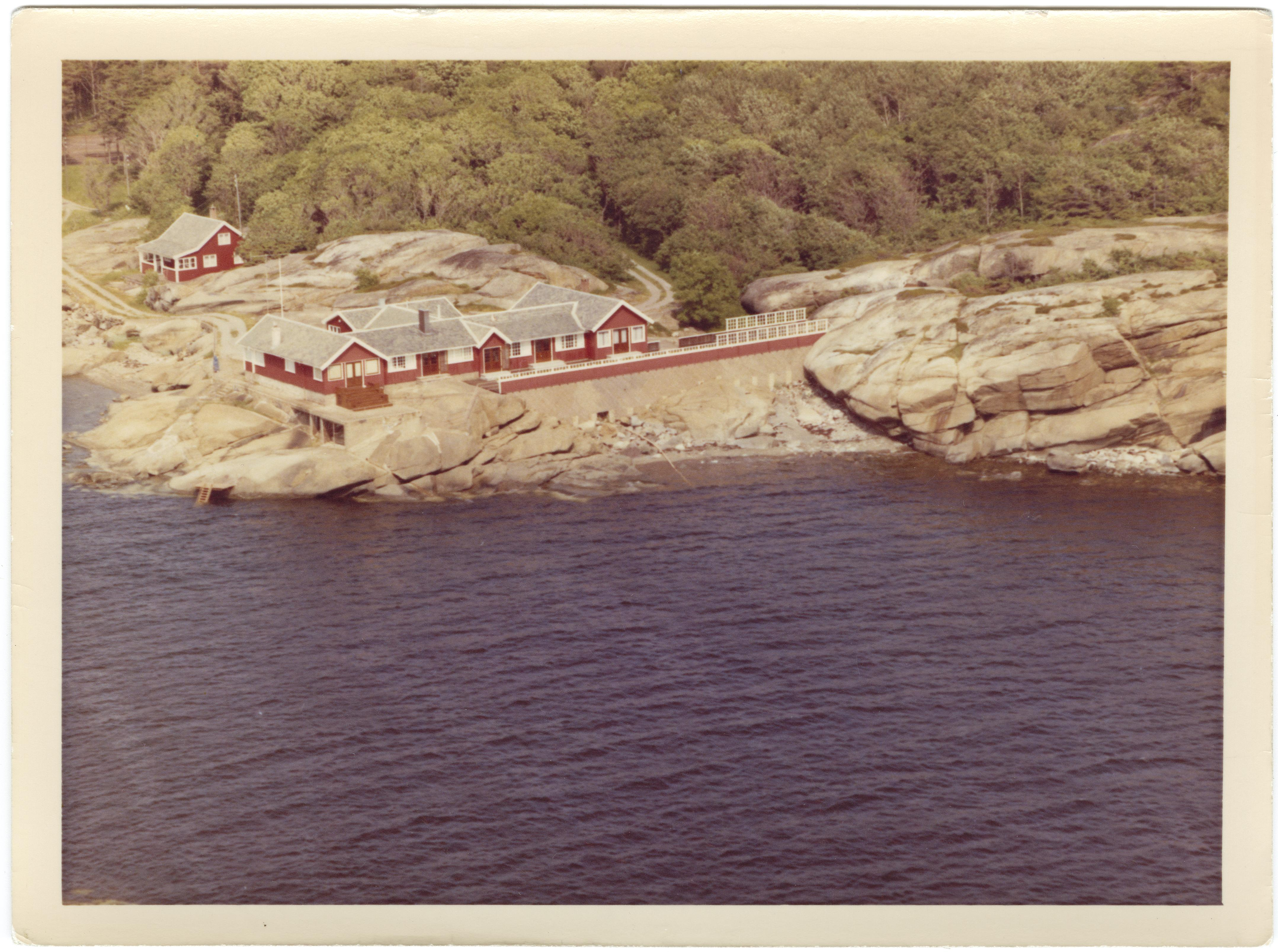
- View of a vacation home at Yxnøy
- Interactive map of Østerøya
- Coordinates: 59.09292°N 10.30255°E
- Location: Vestfold, Norway
- Water bodies: Mefjorden and Tønsbergfjorden

Østerøya (lit. 'East Island') a peninsula in Sandefjord Municipality in Vestfold county, Norway. It is one of two long, narrow peninsulas located south of the city of Sandefjord. The peninsula lies between the Mefjorden and Tønsbergfjorden and it sits across the fjord from the Vesterøya peninsula. The Tønsberg Barrel is located on the southern end of the peninsula. The Tønsberg Barrel is an old sea mark that is mentioned in Sverris saga. It has been described as one of the most beautiful sites in Sandefjord.

Østerøya has a large number of beaches, campgrounds, recreational areas, and vacation homes. The peninsula has a length of 10 kilometres (6.2 mi), and is between 1–2 kilometres (0.62–1.24 mi) in width. It was previously known as Yxnøy, a name which now is used for the southernmost point of the peninsula. Yxnøy, also spelled Yxney, is now a recreational area home to several beaches, forests, sloping rocks, hiking trails, and Tønsberg Barrel. The peninsula is now named Østerøya ("east island") since it is located east of the centre of the city of Sandefjord. The southern end of the peninsula contains public areas for outdoor activities, recreation, fishing and swimming. A preserved area with black alder swamp forest (containing ramsons, iris pseudacorus and early purple orchid) is located here.

During the Viking Age, ocean water levels were about 3 metres (9.8 ft) higher, which meant both Vesterøya and Østerøya peninsulas were islands surrounded by ocean waters.

There are 20 kilometres (12 mi) of hiking trails on Østerøya, which is an extension of the 25 kilometres (16 mi) coastal path at Vesterøya. The combined hiking trail is part of the international North Sea Trail.

Head Above Water ("Hodet over vannet") by film director Nils Gaup was filmed at the southern tip of Østerøya and features Ertsvika at Yxnøy.

== Yxnøy ==
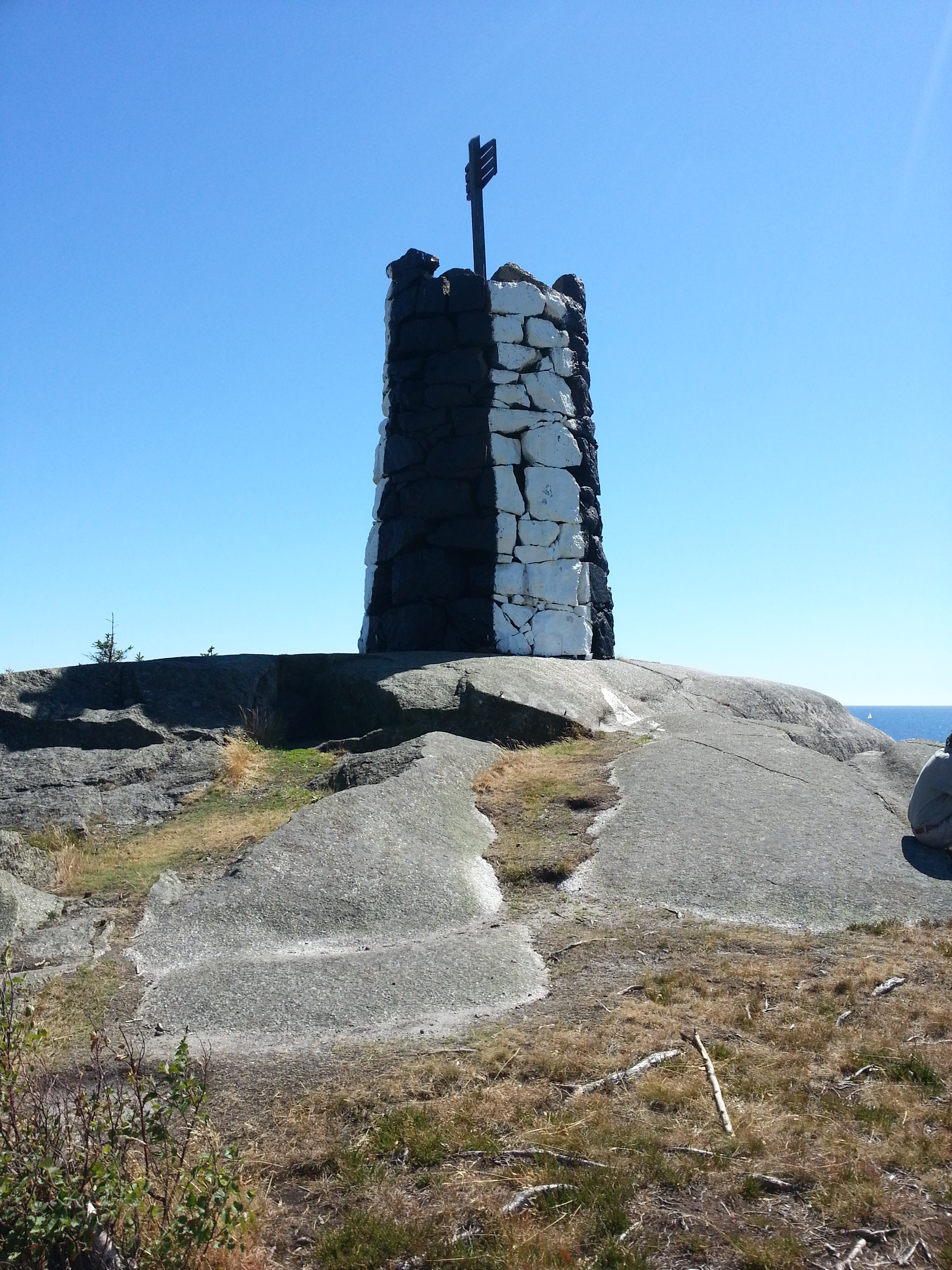
Tønsberg Barrel is located at Yxnøy, the southern tip of Østerøya.

Yxnøy is one of the largest undeveloped areas found along the Vestfold coast. The 5 metres (16 ft) tall Tønsberg Barrel is an old beacon mentioned in Sverris saga from around year 1200. Many ships have sunk near the landmark, which is located at Yxnøy (Yxney) on the southern tip of Østerøya. The seamark (navigation mark) sits on the mountain Tønneberget (Stenbåken) with ocean-views in all directions. It has an elevation of 37 metres (121 ft) and marks the entry point for the city of Tønsberg. Its circumference is at its most 12 metres (39 ft), and it is painted in white and black. The beacon originally consisted of a barrel, hence the name, but was replaced with the current seamark in 1900.

Yxnøy and the area surrounding Tønsberg Barrel were fortified by the German occupation forces during World War II. Bunkers, trenches and other remains from the war can still be seen in the surrounding area. A number of ships have also sunk here, including ships such as Wilhelm Tell in 1851 and Bjørgvin in 1961, which lies 70 metres (230 ft) from the Tønsberg Barrel. In 1907, the ship Union sunk here and its crew of eight men drowned. The coastal hiking trail from Tønsberg Barrel to Skjellvika Beach is about 9 kilometres (5.6 mi) long. It is part of the international North Sea Trail.

Yxnøy is the only place in Norway where the plant species Marsh valerian (Valeriana dioica) occurs. Strandvika Nature Preserve is located at Yxnøy. It is home to a black alder swamp forest containing ramsons, iris pseudacorus and early purple orchid. The nature preserve was established in 1980.

== History ==
Østerøya was fortified during World War II.

== Beaches ==
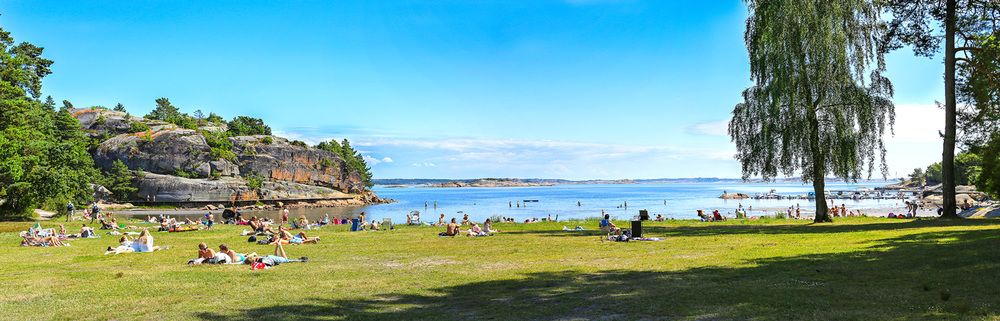
Skjellvika Beach.

Beaches on East Island include:

- Skjellvika
- Flautangen
- Nordre Trubervika
- Strandvika
- Yxnøy
- Ertsvika
- Hagaløkka
- Tallakshavn
