= Lene Elise Bergum =

Norwegian actress (born 1971)

- Born: November 19, 1971 (age 54); Kristiansand, Norway
- Occupation: Actress

Lene Elise Bergum (born November 19, 1971, in Kristiansand, Norway) is a Norwegian actress.

Her breakthrough as an actress came with her role as "Lene" in the movie Hodet over vannet (1993), which has later been remade as a Hollywood-movie, Head Above Water, with Cameron Diaz in the lead role. She had a prominent role as "Camilla" in the TVNorge sit-com Tre på toppen (Three on the Top) in 1997. It was, however, with her role as "Alexandra ‘Alex’ Kvamme" in TV2's success soap Hotel Cæsar that she became a household name for most Norwegians. She acted on the show from 1998 to 2001, and made a comeback in 2004 before she left once more in May of that year. She also had a role in the TV2-show Far og sønn (Father and Son) i 2002. In 2005 she competed for the Norwegian team on the Scandinavian Robinson VIP production.

Bergum also runs a catering company, called Appetitten Kantine og Catering (Appetite Canteen and Catering).

== Filmography ==
- 1993 Hodet over vannet, «Lene»
- 1998–2000 Hotel Cæsar (TV), Alexandra 'Alex' Kvamme
