= Hodet over vannet =

- Directed by: Nils Gaup
- Written by: Eirik Ildahl; Geir Eriksen
- Produced by: John M. Jacobsen
- Starring: Lene Elise Bergum; Svein Roger Karlsen; Morten Abel; Reidar Sørensen
- Cinematography: Erling Thurmann-Andersen
- Edited by: Malte Wadman
- Music by: Kjetil Bjerkestrand
- Production company: Filmkameratene A/S
- Release date: October 8, 1993
- Running time: 91 minutes
- Country: Norway
- Language: Norwegian
- Box office: NOK8.1 million

Hodet over vannet is a Norwegian comedy thriller film by director Nils Gaup. It became a big success at the Norwegian box office. In 1993, it was one of the ten most seen films in Norwegian movie theaters. In the year after, 1994, it won the Amanda Award for Best Norwegian Film in Theatrical Release.

It is a production of the company Filmkameratene A/S. In 1996, an American remake of the film was released, which starred Cameron Diaz and Harvey Keitel.

It was filmed at Yxnøy on Østerøya (East Island) in Sandefjord Municipality, Norway. It is inspired by Steven Spielberg's Jaws and various Alfred Hitchcock films.

== Plot ==
The storyline revolves around married couple Lene and Einar, who are vacationing on a small island off the coast of Southern Norway. The husband leaves for a fishing trip with his friend Bjørn. While they are gone, Lene is visited by Gaute, a former lover who arrives drunk. He spends the night at the vacation house. When Lene goes to wake Gaute, she discovers he is dead. The following morning, Einar comes back from his fishing trip and discovers Gaute's dead body in the basement. He and Lene then try to decide how to dispose of the body.

== Cast ==
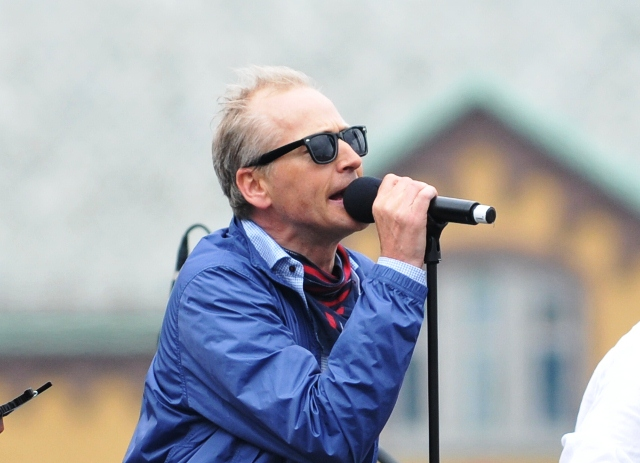
Morten Abel plays a role in the movie and made its title track. He is one of Norway's biggest pop stars.

- Lene Elise Bergum as Lene
- Svein Roger Karlsen as Einar
- Morten Abel as Bjørn
- Reidar Sørensen as Gaute
- Jon Skolmen as the Police officer

== Film music ==
The title track was recorded by pop artist Morten Abel who also plays the role of Bjørn in the film. On January 15, 1994, the song reached No. 9 in the Norwegian national record chart VG-lista for Top 10 Singles. It remains one of two times Morten Abel gained a hit on VG-lista. Additionally, "Hodet over vannet" charted on the Eurochart Hot 100, peaking at No. 88.

== Remake ==
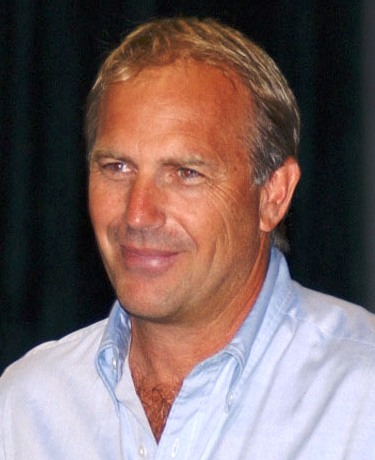
Kevin Costner purchased the remake rights in 1995.

In 1995, the film was sold to Hollywood for a remake production. Actor and filmmaker Kevin Costner was impressed with the film and later purchased the remake rights under Tig Productions in Hollywood. The American remake version, which is starring Cameron Diaz and Harvey Keitel, was directed by Jim Wilson. The U.S. version ultimately had little success at the box office in either country.

The U.S. version was rated PG-13 by the MPAA, while the Norwegian version was given a 15+ age restriction by the Norwegian Media Authority.

== Awards and nominations ==
Hodet over vannet was nominated for the Amanda Award for Best Nordic Film, Best Norwegian Film in Theatrical Release, Best Actor (Svein Roger Karlsen), and Best Actress (Lene Elise Bergum). It received the Amanda Award for Best Norwegian Film in Theatrical Release. It was also selected as the Norwegian entry for the Best Foreign Language Film at the 66th Academy Awards, but was not accepted as a nominee.
