= Vesterøya =

Peninsula in Sandefjord Municipality, Norway

- Peninsula
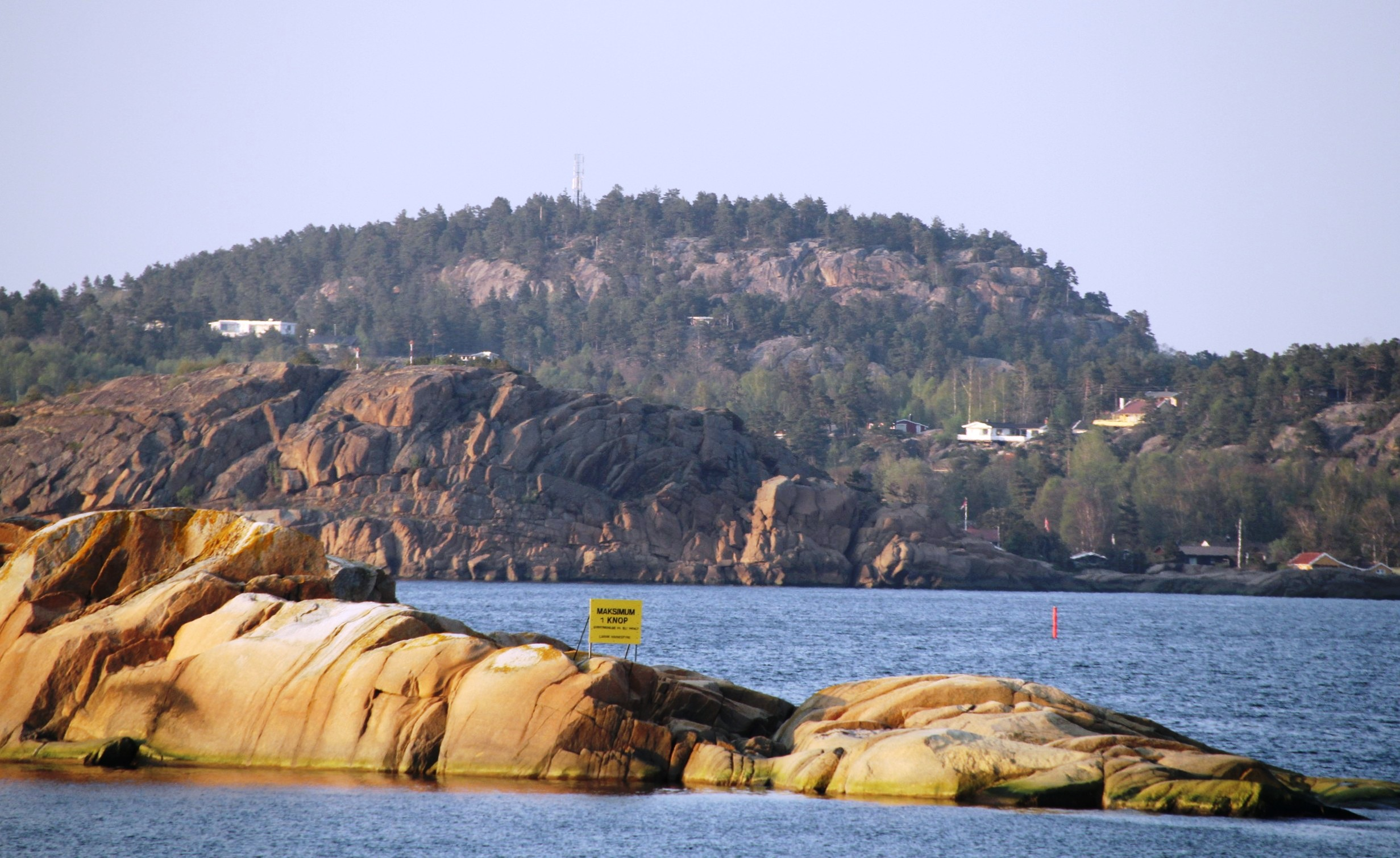
- View of Vesterøya
- Interactive map of Vesterøya
- Coordinates: 59.08002°N 10.26886°E
- Location: Vestfold, Norway
- Water bodies: Sandefjordsfjorden and Mefjorden

Vesterøya (lit. 'West Island') a peninsula in Sandefjord Municipality in Vestfold county, Norway. It is one of two long, narrow peninsulas located south of the city of Sandefjord. The peninsula lies between the Mefjorden and Sandefjordsfjorden and it sits across the fjord from the Østerøya peninsula. The peninsula is primarily known for its many beaches and idyllic coastal landscape, but there are also numerous trails used for hiking and biking.

The landscape is dominated by hills, mountains, forests, beaches, sloping rocks, and farm fields. The peninsula has a length of 10 kilometers. It is home to a large number of vacation homes, beaches, campgrounds, and recreational areas. There are about 25 kilometres (16 mi) of hiking trails on Vesterøya, which is connected to the 20-kilometre (12 mi) coastal path on Østerøya. The hiking trail is part of the international North Sea Trail.

== Name ==
Seawater levels were about| 20 metres (66 ft) higher 5,000 years ago, which means Vesterøya consisted of a large island and 25-30 minor islets. During the Viking Age, ocean water levels were about 3–4 metres (9.8–13.1 ft) higher than today. Therefore, Vesterøya was an island separated from the mainland by shallow waters (hence the name), and then later, it became a peninsula as water levels decreased. Vesterøya was previously known as Velløy, which derives from the Old Norse Vaðilløy. The first element comes from the word vaðill which means "shallow water" or "ford" and the word øy which means "island". Other historical names used for the peninsula include Velløy, Vælløy, Valløy, Veløyene, and Vælløynni.

== Folehavna Fort ==
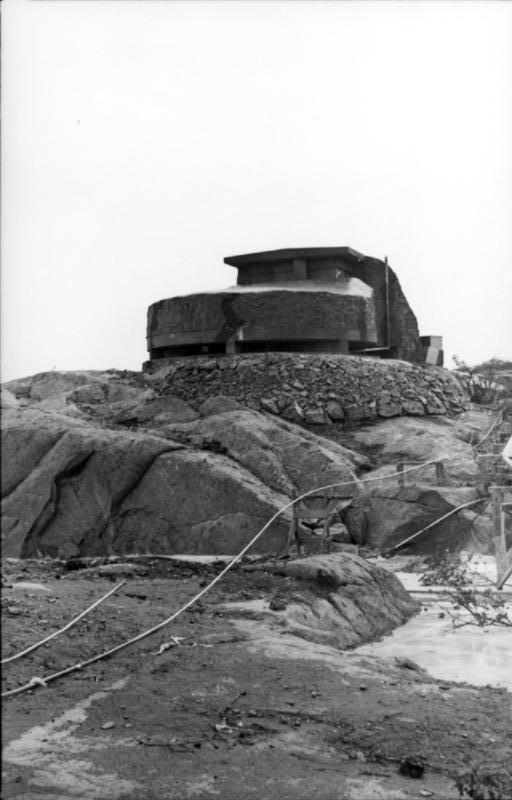
Folehavna Fort contains ruins from a German fortress erected in 1941.

Folehavna Fort is located at the southernmost point of the peninsula. It was constructed by the Germans in 1941 during the German occupation of Norway. The surrounding area came under German control on 8 May 1941, and the fortifications were raised the same month. By the end of the war, the fort was equipped with four Belgian cannons and several anti-aircraft cannons. The fort was in use by German occupation forces until January 1943. It was equipped with tunnels, bunkers, trenches, fencing, barracks, floodlights, battlements, and minefields.

The Norwegian Armed Forces maintained control of the area until 1995 when it became a public recreation area. Bunkers, trenches, barracks, and tunnels can still be seen at Folehavna. At most about 200 German troops were stationed at Folehavna Fort. It is the southernmost point of Sandefjord which is located on the mainland (not including islands).

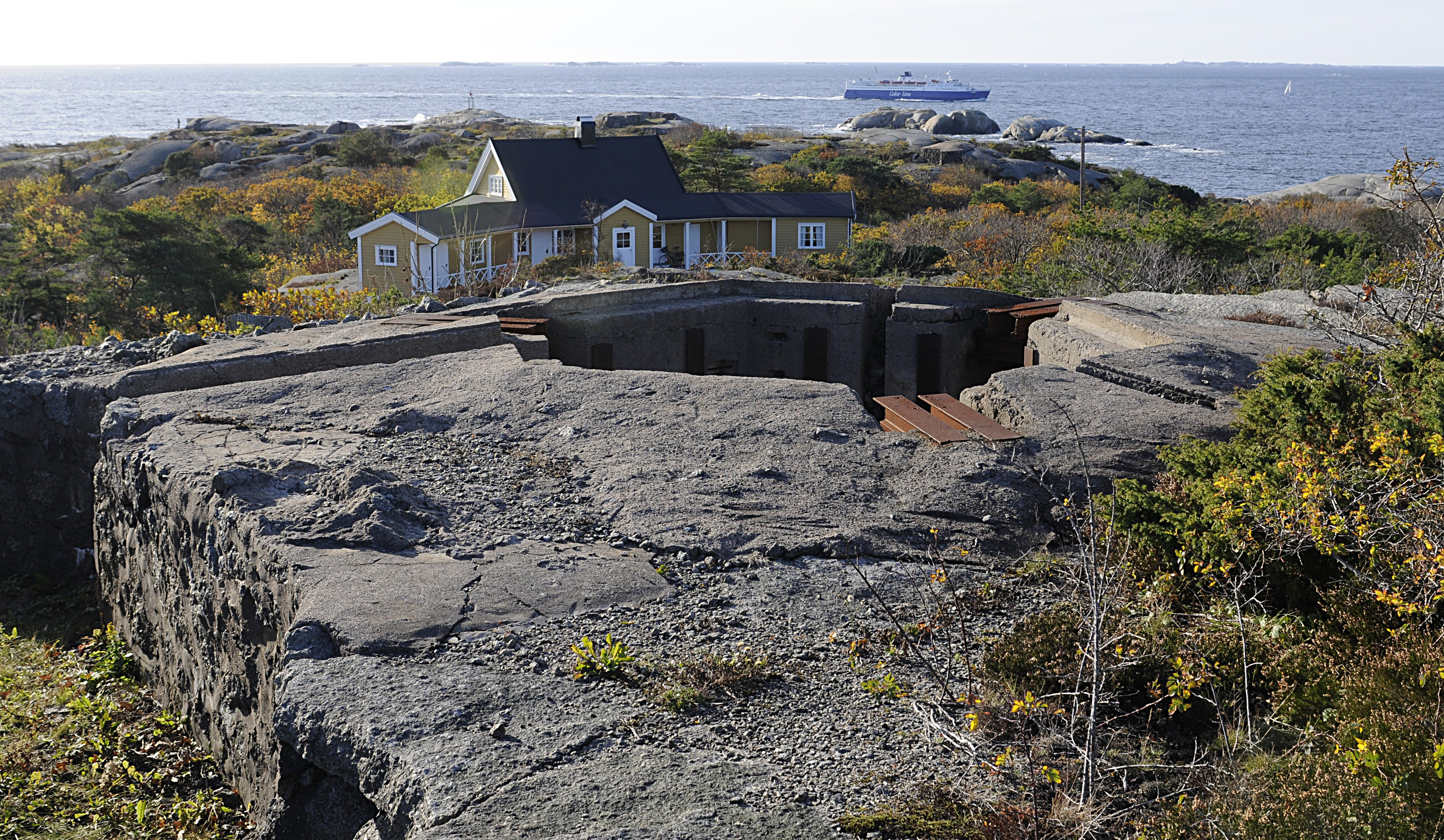
A former commander home at Folehavna.

German forces constructed three large tunnels at Folehavna, including a 120-metre (390 ft) long tunnel. Four 15-centimetre (5.9 in) cannons were also installed in concrete gun pits on the sloping rocks. The four K-370 b cannons had a target range of 15,000 metres (9.3 mi). The fort's first commander was Hauptmann Klenner and the fort's purpose was to protect the coastal entry to Sandefjord.

The fort was originally known as "Vesterøen" but was given the name Folehavna in 1943. The area was occupied by German forces in 1941 when Folehavna was owned by shipowner Anton Fredrik Klaveness. Folehavna came under the control of the Norwegian Armed Forces in May 1945, and in July 1950, an area of 0.2 square kilometres (49 acres) was deemed an open-space area open for visitors. The Norwegian Armed Forces maintained control of the area until 1993. Although German forces at the fort were never in direct battles, they utilized Folehavna Fort to shoot down a British airplane in 1944. Today, Folehavna is used for recreational activities such as hiking, biking, and fishing. The parking lot is located about 1.5 kilometres (0.93 mi) from the fort.

== Geography ==
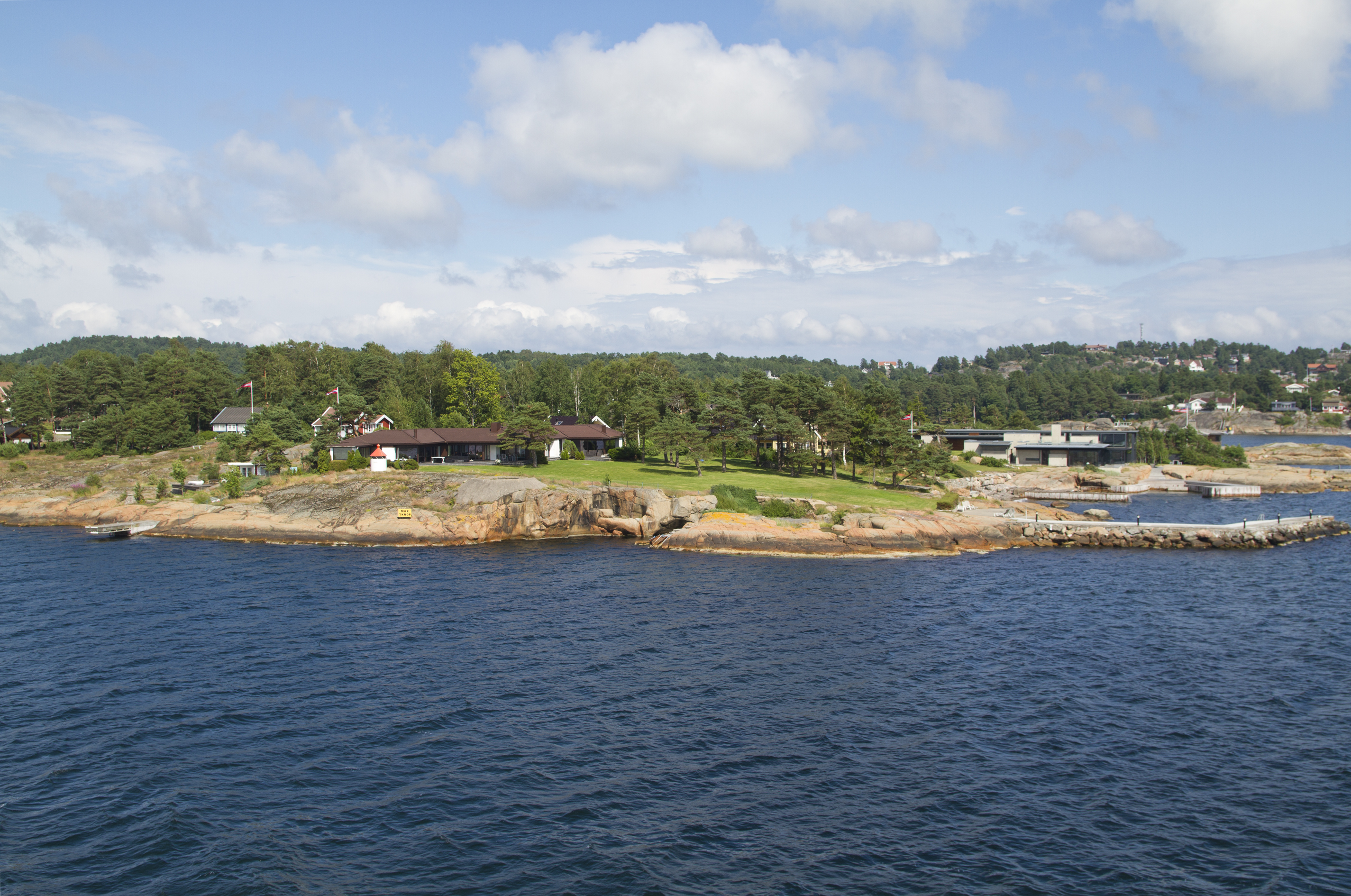
Åsnes

Veserøya is a 10-kilometre (6.2 mi) long peninsula that's located immediately south of the center of the city of Sandefjrod. Its highest hills, Kamfjordåsene, lie on the northern part of the peninsula and has an elevation of around 100 metres (330 ft) above sea level. Another hill, Vardås, is a popular hiking destination. The landscape is characterized by steep hills, smooth rock slopes, farm fields, minor bays, and a number of beaches and islets, and an extensive coastline. The bedrock that Vesterøya consists of, Larvikite, was created roughly 270 million years ago of plutonic rocks by magma.

Vesterøya is home to numerous preserved areas, including Holtan Plant Preserve, the only place in Vestfold where the species Pipsissewa (Chimaphila umbellata) occurs.

== Beaches ==
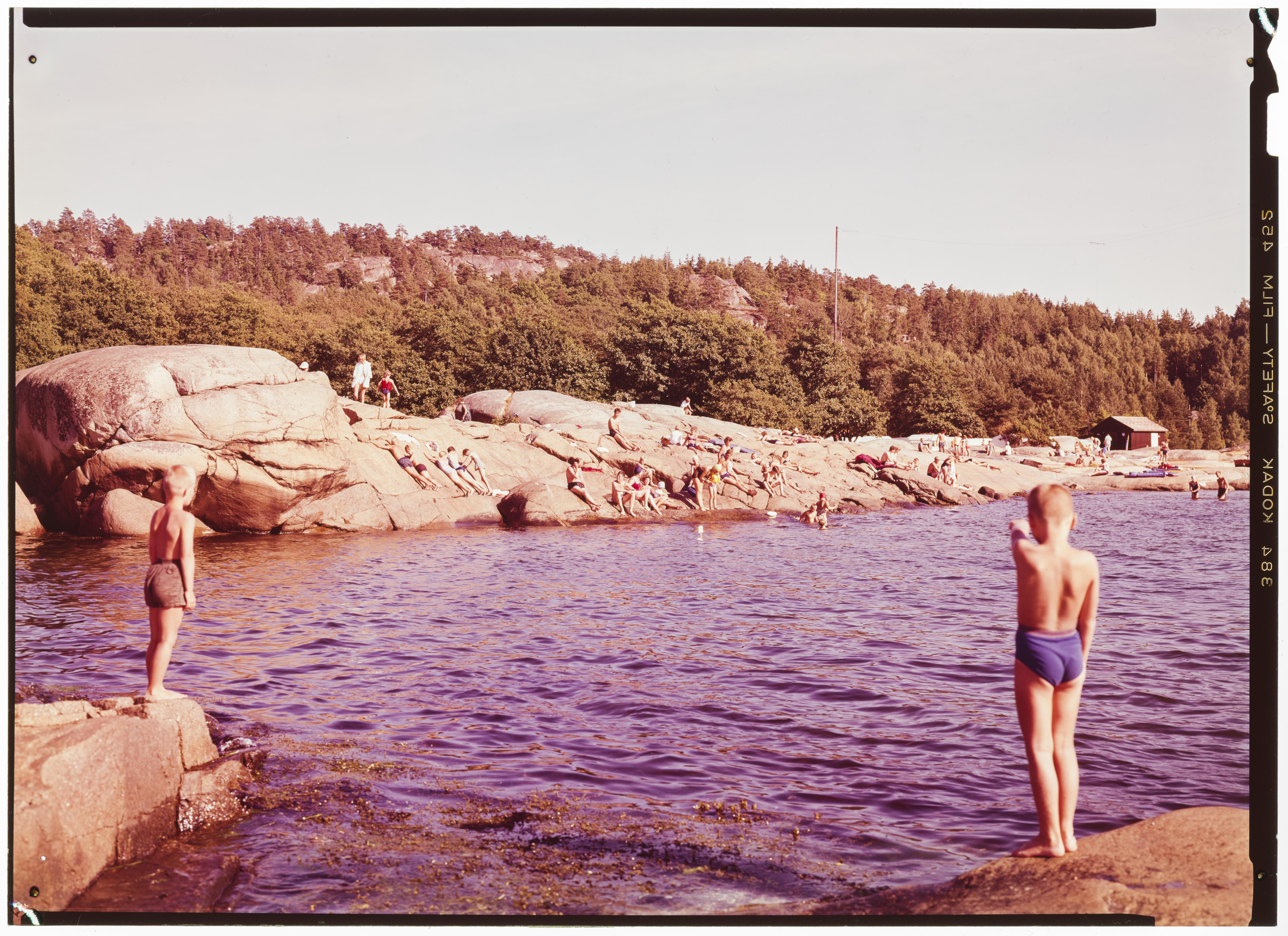
Langeby in 1966, National Library of Norway.

Some beaches located on the shores of Vesterøya:

- Asnes
- Tangen
- Folehavna
- Sjøbakken
- Langeby
- Albertstranda
- Vøra
- Fruvika
- Grubesand
- Langestrand
- Ormestadvika

A rest area ("Thomas Numme rasteplass") at Langeby Beach is named after TV personality Thomas Numme, who grew up on Vesterøya.

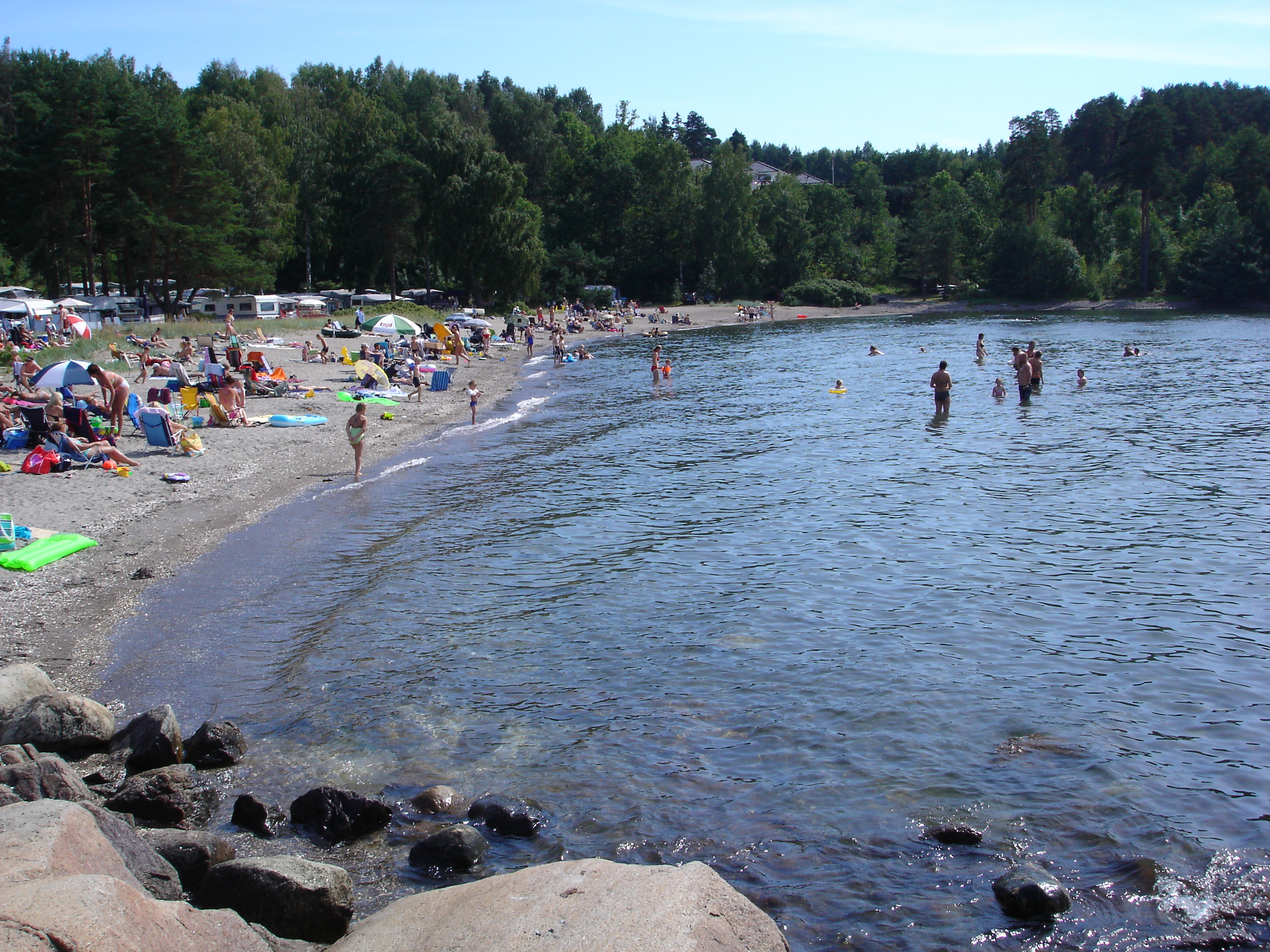
Langeby

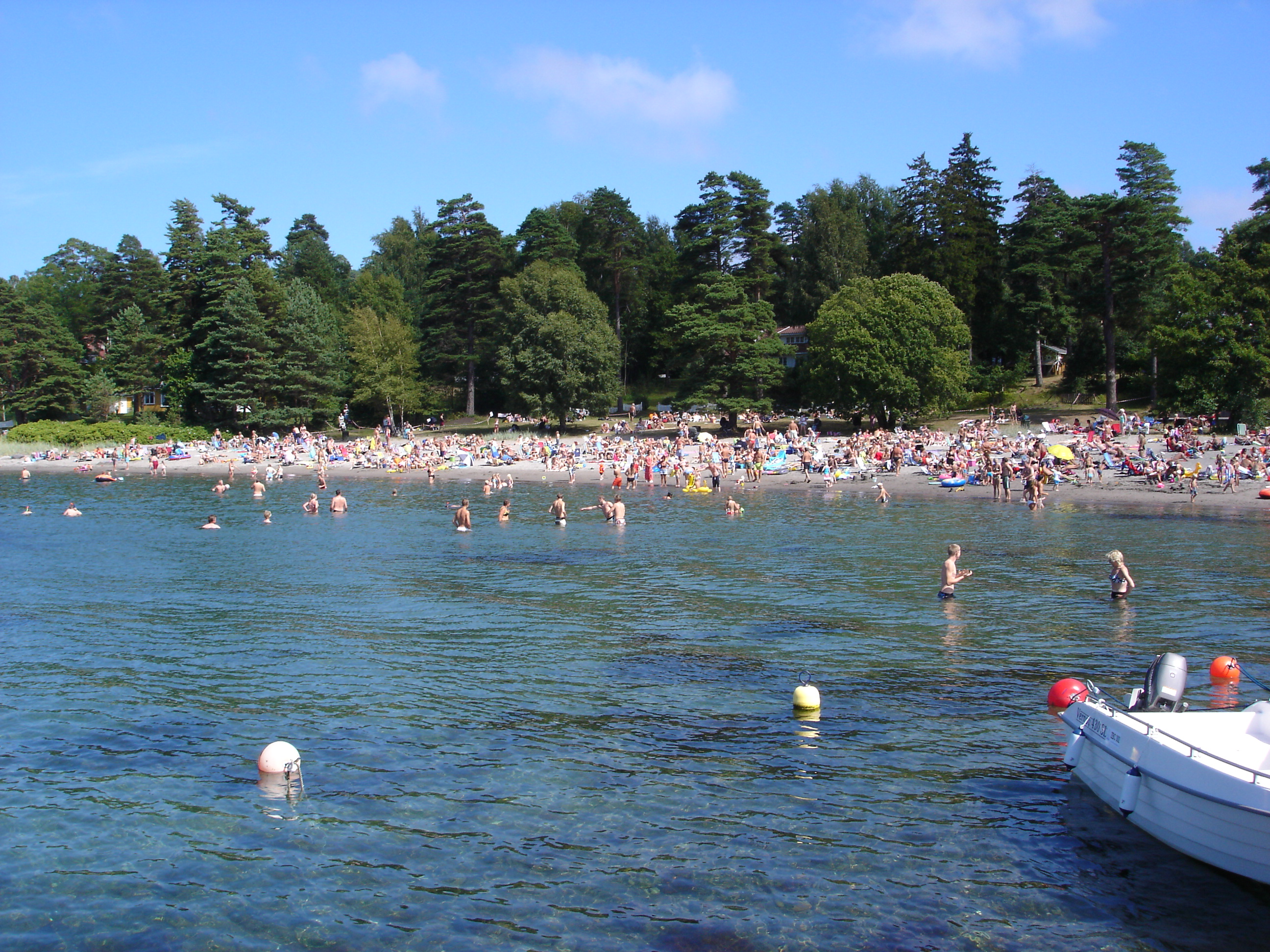
Vøra

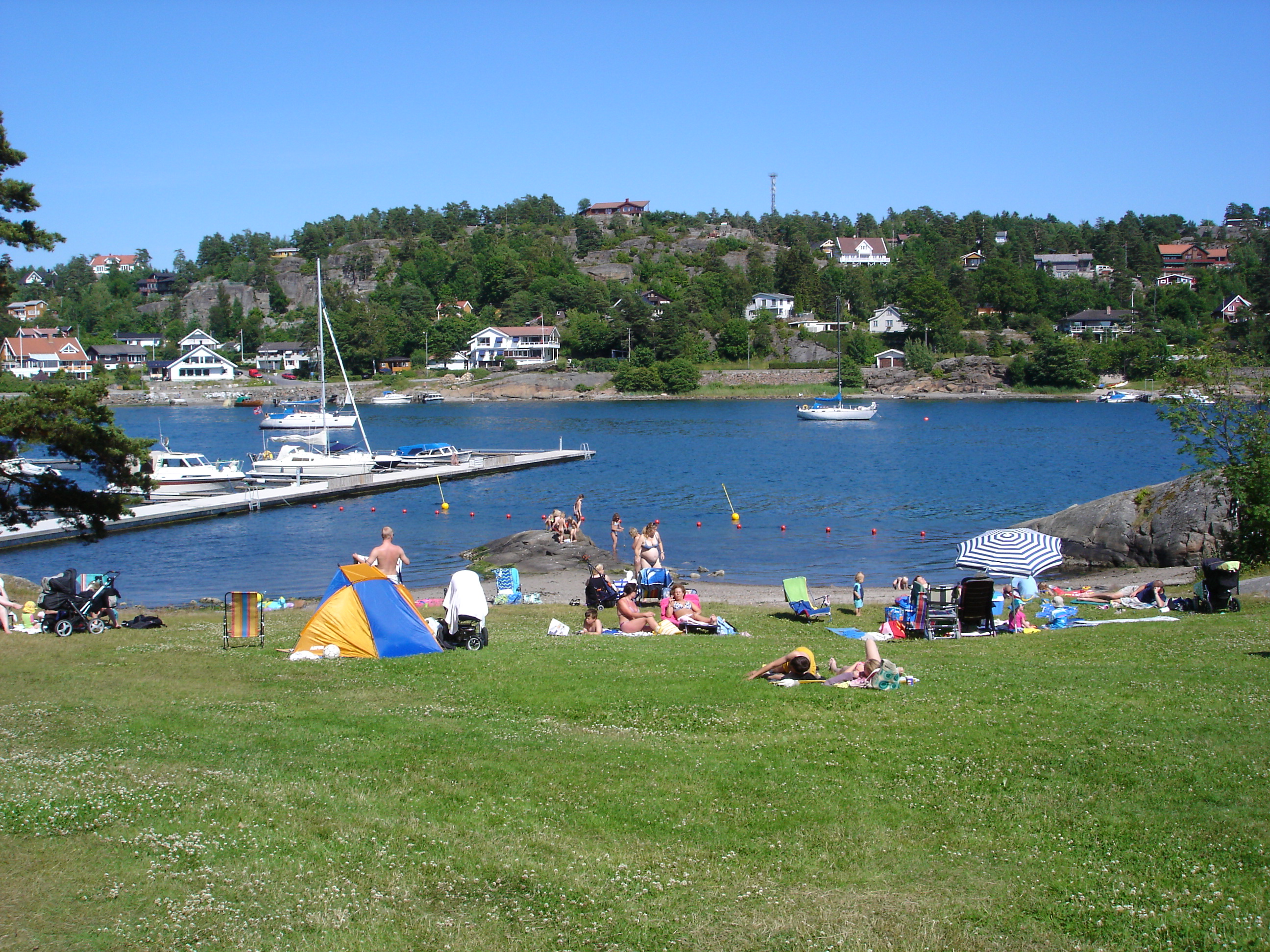
Tangen, north side

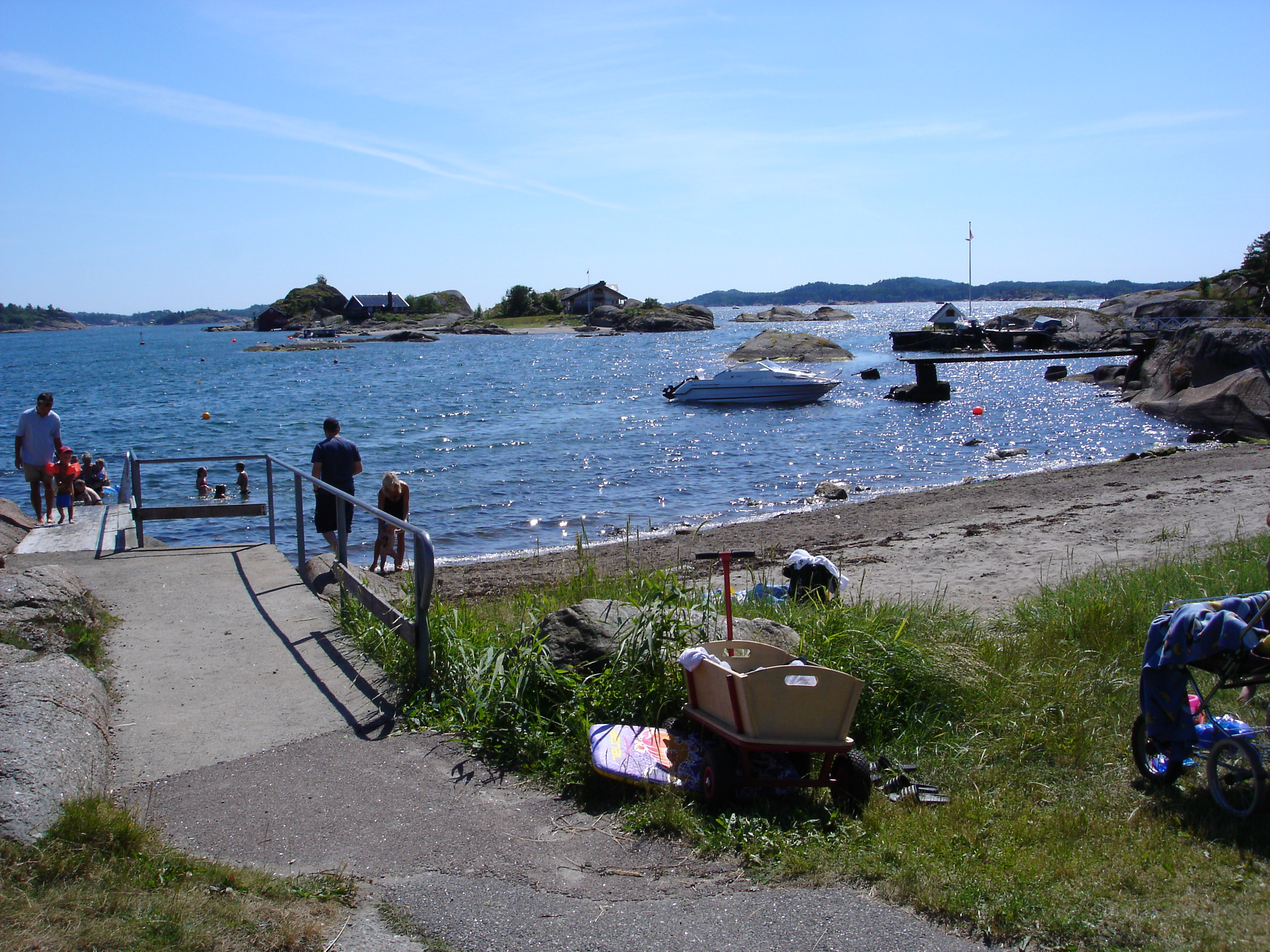
Tangen, south side
