= Dances With Wolves =

1990 film by Kevin Costner

- Theatrical release poster
- Directed by: Kevin Costner
- Screenplay by: Michael Blake
- Based on: Dances With Wolves by Michael Blake
- Produced by: Jim Wilson; Kevin Costner
- Starring: Kevin Costner; Mary McDonnell; Graham Greene; Rodney Grant
- Cinematography: Dean Semler
- Edited by: Neil Travis
- Music by: John Barry
- Production companies: Tig Productions; Majestic Films International
- Distributed by: Orion Pictures (North America); Majestic Films International (International)
- Release dates: October 19, 1990 (Uptown Theater); November 9, 1990 (United States)
- Running time: 181 minutes
- Country: United States
- Languages: English; Lakota; Pawnee
- Budget: $22 million
- Box office: $424.2 million

Dances With Wolves is a 1990 American epic revisionist Western film directed and produced by Kevin Costner in his feature directorial debut. Starring Costner with an ensemble cast including Mary McDonnell, Graham Greene and Rodney Grant, the film is a film adaptation of the 1988 novel Dances With Wolves by Michael Blake (who also wrote the screenplay). It tells the story of Union army Lieutenant John J. Dunbar (Costner), who travels to the American frontier to find a military post and who meets a group of Lakota.

Costner purchased the rights of the novel, with an eye on directing it, after encouraging Blake in early 1986 to turn a Western screenplay into a novel to improve its chances of being produced. The film was produced with an initial budget of $15 million, but was eventually produced with a budget of $22 million. The project was turned down by several studios due to the Western genre no longer being popular, as well as the length of the script. After the project languished at both Nelson Entertainment and Island Pictures, Costner and Jim Wilson sold the foreign rights in several countries and obtained enough money to go into pre-production. The two then made a deal with Orion Pictures. Much of the dialogue is spoken in Lakota with English subtitles. Filming occurred from July to November 1989 in South Dakota and Wyoming, and it was translated by Doris Leader Charge, of the Lakota Studies department at Sinte Gleska University.

Dances With Wolves premiered at the Uptown Theater in Washington, D.C. on October 19, and was released in the United States on November 9. The film received positive reviews from critics and audiences, who praised Costner's directing, the performances, screenplay, score, cinematography, and production values. It was a commercial success, grossing $424.2 million worldwide, becoming the fourth-highest-grossing film of 1990 and the highest-grossing film for Orion Pictures, as well as the highest-grossing independent film to that date. The film received twelve nominations at the 63rd Academy Awards and won seven awards: Best Picture, Best Director for Costner, Best Adapted Screenplay, Best Film Editing, Best Cinematography, Best Original Score, and Best Sound Mixing. The film also won the Golden Globe Award for Best Motion Picture – Drama. It is one of only four Westerns to win the Academy Award for Best Picture, the other three being Cimarron (1931), Unforgiven (1992), and No Country for Old Men (2007).

It is credited as a leading influence for the revitalization of the Western genre of filmmaking in Hollywood. In 2007, Dances With Wolves was selected for preservation in the United States National Film Registry by the Library of Congress as being "culturally, historically, or aesthetically significant".

== Plot ==
In 1863, 1st Lieutenant John J. Dunbar, serving with the Union army, is wounded in a stalemated battle at St. David's Field in Tennessee. The surgeon intends to amputate his leg. Choosing death in battle instead, Dunbar steals a horse and rides in front of Confederate lines unarmed, but miraculously survives his suicide attempt. Union troops take advantage of the distraction to mount a successful attack. Dunbar is given medical care that saves his leg and is awarded "Cisco", the horse he rode during his suicide attempt, along with his choice of posting. He requests a transfer to the American frontier to see it before it disappears.

Dunbar arrives at Fort Hays, where its commander, Major Fambrough, assigns him to the farthest outpost under his jurisdiction, Fort Sedgwick. Fambrough, who is mentally ill, fails to inform anyone where Dunbar is going and kills himself after Dunbar departs. Dunbar travels with Timmons, a foul-mouthed mule-wagon provisioner, and finds the fort deserted. He decides to rebuild the fort, recording his observations in his diary. Timmons is killed by a band of Pawnee while returning to Fort Hays. The deaths of Timmons and Fambrough leave the army unaware of Dunbar's assignment, so no other soldiers arrive to reinforce the post.

Dunbar encounters his Sioux neighbors when they attempt to steal his horse and intimidate him. Wanting to make peace, he seeks out the Sioux camp. En route, he comes across Stands With A Fist (formerly Christine Gunther), a white Sioux woman who was adopted as a girl by the tribe's medicine man, Kicking Bird, after Pawnee killed her family. She is mutilating herself in mourning for her late Sioux husband. Dunbar brings her back to the Sioux to recover. Though the Sioux are initially hostile, Dunbar gradually establishes a rapport with them, notably Kicking Bird, the Sioux fighter Wind In His Hair, and the youth Smiles A Lot. Stands With A Fist acts as an interpreter, speaking Lakota and English.

Dunbar comes to respect and appreciate the Sioux, winning their acceptance when he helps them find and hunt a large herd of buffalo. He also befriends a wolf he dubs "Two Socks" for his white forepaws. Observing Dunbar and Two Socks chasing each other, the tribe gives him a Sioux name that translates as "Dances With Wolves". Dunbar learns the Lakota language and gives the tribe his stash of firearms in time to defeat a raiding party of Pawnee warriors. He eventually earns Kicking Bird's approval to marry Stands With A Fist, becoming a full member of the tribe.

Because of the threat of encroaching white settlers, Chief Ten Bears decides to move his group to its winter camp. Dunbar decides to accompany them but first attempts to retrieve his diary from Fort Sedgwick, as it would help the U.S. Army locate the group at its new location. When he arrives, he finds the fort reoccupied by Union soldiers. Because of his Sioux clothing, the soldiers open fire, killing Cisco, and capture Dunbar. He cannot prove his story, as one of the soldiers had stolen his diary. Refusing to help the army hunt down the Sioux, he is charged with desertion and put in a wagon train returning to Fort Hays. Two Socks attempts to follow Dunbar but is shot dead by the soldiers as target practice.

Dunbar's Sioux friends track and attack the convoy, killing the soldiers and freeing Dunbar before taking him to the winter camp. Dunbar leaves with Stands With A Fist knowing that he will now be hunted by the Army as a traitor. As they leave, Dunbar and Kicking Bird exchange parting gifts. Smiles A Lot returns the diary he recovered during Dunbar's rescue, and Wind In His Hair proclaims his everlasting friendship to Dunbar.

U.S. troops and their Pawnee scouts search the mountains but cannot locate Dunbar or the Sioux. The film's epilogue text states that thirteen years later, the last of the free Sioux would surrender at Fort Robinson, Nebraska.

== Cast ==
- Kevin Costner as Lt. John J. Dunbar/Dances With Wolves (Lakota: Šuŋgmánitu Tȟáŋka Ób Wačhí)
- Mary McDonnell as Stands With A Fist (Napépȟeča Nážiŋ Wiŋ)/Christine Gunther
  - Annie Costner (Costner's real-life daughter) plays young Christine Gunther
- Graham Greene as Kicking Bird (Ziŋtká Nagwáka)
- Rodney A. Grant as Wind In His Hair (Pȟehíŋ Otȟáte)
- Floyd Westerman as Chief Ten Bears (Matȟó Wikčémna)
- Tantoo Cardinal as Black Shawl (Šiná Sápa Wiŋ)
- Jimmy Herman as Stone Calf (Íŋyaŋ Ptehíŋčala)
- Nathan Lee Chasing His Horse as Smiles A Lot (Iȟá S'a)
- Michael Spears as Otter (Ptáŋ)
- Jason R. Lone Hill as Worm (Waglúla)
- Charles Rocket as Lt. Elgin
- Robert Pastorelli as Timmons
- Tony Pierce as Spivey
- Larry Joshua as Bauer
- Kirk Baltz as Edwards
- Tom Everett as Sergeant Pepper
- Maury Chaykin as Major Fambrough
- Wes Studi as Toughest Pawnee
- Wayne Grace as the Major
- Michael Horton as Captain Cargill (extended version)
- Doris Leader Charge as Pretty Shield, Chief Ten Bears' wife (also credited as Lakota translator and dialogue coach)
- Donald Hotton as General Tide
- Frank P. Costanza as Tucker
- Otakuye Conroy as Kicking Bird's daughter
- Jim Wilson as Doctor (uncredited)

== Production ==
Originally written as a speculative script by Michael Blake, it went unsold in the mid-1980s. However, Kevin Costner had starred in Blake's only previous film, Stacy's Knights (1983) and encouraged Blake in early 1986 to turn the Western screenplay into a novel to improve its chances of being produced. The novel was rejected by numerous publishers, but finally was published in paperback in 1988. The rights were purchased by Costner, with an eye on directing it. Costner dropped out of The Hunt for Red October (1990) in favor of Dances of Wolves.

Costner and his producing partner, Jim Wilson, struggled to raise money for filming. The project was turned down by several studios who cited the waning popularity of Western films, the disastrous box office of Heaven's Gate several years earlier, and the length of the script. After the project languished at both Nelson Entertainment and Island Pictures, Costner and Wilson sold the foreign rights in several countries and obtained enough money to go into pre-production. The two then made a deal with Orion Pictures, which gave Costner final cut rights.

Actual production lasted from July 17 or 18 to November 21 or 23, 1989. Most of the movie was filmed on location in South Dakota, mainly on private ranches near Pierre and Rapid City, with a few scenes filmed in Wyoming. Specific locations included the Badlands National Park, the Black Hills, the Sage Creek Wilderness Area, and the Belle Fourche River area. The bison hunt scenes were filmed at the Triple U Buffalo Ranch outside Fort Pierre, South Dakota, as were the Fort Sedgewick scenes on a custom set.

Author and screenwriter Michael Blake said that Stands With A Fist was actually based upon Cynthia Ann Parker, the white girl captured by Comanches and mother of Quanah Parker.

== Reception ==
As of July 8, 2026, the film holds an approval rating of 87% on Rotten Tomatoes, based on 131 reviews, with an average rating of 8.1/10. The website's critical consensus reads: "Dances With Wolves suffers from a simplistic view of the culture it attempts to honor, but the end result remains a stirring western whose noble intentions are often matched by its epic grandeur." Metacritic gave the film a score of 72 out of 100 based on 20 critical reviews, indicating "generally favorable" reviews. CinemaScore reported that audiences gave the film a rare "A+" grade.

Dances With Wolves was named one of the top ten films of 1990 by over 115 critics and was named the best film of the year by 19 critics.

Because of the film's popularity and lasting impact on the image of Native Americans, members of the Lakota Sioux Nation held a ceremony in Washington, D.C., "to honor Kevin [Costner] and Mary [McDonnell] and Jim [Wilson] on behalf of the Indian Lakota nation", explained Floyd Westerman (who plays Chief Ten Bears in the movie). Albert Whitehat, a Lakota elder who served as a cultural adviser on the film, adopted Costner into his family, and two other families adopted McDonnell and Wilson. Westerman continued, that this is so "They will all become part of one family." At the 63rd Academy Awards ceremony in 1991, Dances With Wolves earned 12 Academy Award nominations and won seven, including Best Writing, Adapted Screenplay (Michael Blake), Best Director (Costner), and Best Picture. In 2007, the Library of Congress selected Dances With Wolves for preservation in the United States National Film Registry.

Some of the criticism of the film centered on the perceived lack of authenticity of the Lakota language used in the film, as only one of the actors was a native speaker of the language. Oglala Lakota activist and actor Russell Means was critical of the film's lack of accuracy. In 2009, he said: "Remember Lawrence of Arabia? That was Lawrence of the Plains. The odd thing about making that movie is that they had a woman teaching the actors the Lakota language, but Lakota has a male-gendered language and a female-gendered language. Some of the Natives and Kevin Costner were speaking in the feminine way. When I went to see it with a bunch of Lakota guys, we were laughing."

Michael Smith (Sioux), the director of San Francisco's long-running annual American Indian Film Festival, said that despite criticisms, "there's a lot of good feeling about the film in the Native community, especially among the tribes. I think it's going to be very hard to top this one." However, Blackfeet filmmaker George Budreau countered: "I want to say, 'how nice',... But, no matter how sensitive and wonderful this movie is, you have to ask who's telling the story. It's certainly not an Indian."

Judith A. Boughter wrote, "The problem with Costner's approach is that all of the Sioux are heroic, while the Pawnees are portrayed as stereotypical villains. Most accounts of Sioux–Pawnee relations see the Pawnees, numbering only 4,000 at that time, as victims of the more powerful Sioux."

Though promoted as a breakthrough in its use of an indigenous language, earlier English-language films, such as Eskimo (1933), Wagon Master (1950), and The White Dawn (1974) also have native dialogue.

David Sirota of Salon referred to Dances With Wolves as a "white savior" film, as Dunbar "fully embeds himself in the Sioux tribe and quickly becomes its primary protector". He argued that its use of the "noble savage" character type "preemptively blunts criticism of the underlying White Savior story".

=== Accolades ===
In addition to becoming the first Western film to win an Academy Award for Best Picture since 1931's Cimarron, Dances With Wolves swept the Motion Picture Academy Awards that year, with a record, for the genre, of seven Oscars (including Best Picture), by far the most of any Western film in history. It also won a number of additional awards, making it one of the most honored films of 1990.

=== Home media ===
The film was released on home video in the United States in September 1991 by Orion Home Video and beat the rental record set by Ghost, at 649,000 units. In 1992, there was a McDonald's promotion where customers could buy a VHS copy if they also purchased food.

The extended Special Edition was released on DVD on May 20, 2003, in a two-disc set. Dances With Wolves was then released on Blu-ray and DVD on January 11, 2011, and was re-released on Blu-ray on January 13, 2015, and again on November 13, 2018.

== Cancelled sequel ==
The Holy Road, a sequel novel by Michael Blake, the author of both the original novel and the movie screenplay, was published in 2001.

Salvador Carrasco was attached to direct the sequel, but the film was not realized. As of 2007, Blake was writing a film adaptation. However, Costner stated in a 2008 interview that he would "never make a sequel".

== Extended version ==
One year after the original theatrical release of Dances With Wolves, a four-hour version of the film opened at select cinemas in London. This longer cut was titled Dances With Wolves: The Special Edition, and it restored nearly an hour's worth of scenes that had been removed to keep the original film's running time under three hours. In a letter to British film reviewers, Kevin Costner and producer Jim Wilson addressed their reasons for presenting a longer version of the film:

Why add another hour to a film that by most standards pushes the time limit of conventional movie making? The 52 additional minutes that represent this "new" version were difficult to cut in the first place, and ... the opportunity to introduce them to audiences is compelling. We have received countless letters from people worldwide asking when or if a sequel would be made, so it seemed like a logical step to enhance our film with existing footage ... making an extended version is by no means to imply that the original Dances With Wolves was unfinished or incomplete; rather, it creates an opportunity for those who fell in love with the characters and the spectacle of the film to experience more of both.

Of course, exhibitors may not want a longer version of an already widely seen movie, but Wilson remains optimistic. "I don't think the time is now", he acknowledges, "but ideally, there is a point at which it would come out with an intermission, booked into the very best venues in America."

Costner later stated that he did not work on the creation of the Special Edition at all.

== Soundtrack ==
- John Barry composed the Oscar-winning and Grammy-winning score. It was issued in 1990, initially, and again in 1995 with bonus tracks and in 2004 with the score "in its entirety".
- Peter Buffett scored the "Fire Dance" scene.

== See also ==
- Avatar (2009 film) – 2009 film by James Cameron
- The Last Samurai – 2003 film by Edward Zwick
- A Man Called Horse (film) – 1970 Western film by Elliot Silverstein
- Red Scorpion – 1989 film by Joseph Zito
- Run of the Arrow – 1957 film by Samuel Fuller
- Survival film – Film genre depicting survival efforts
