= Coastline of the North Sea =

Land bordering the North Sea

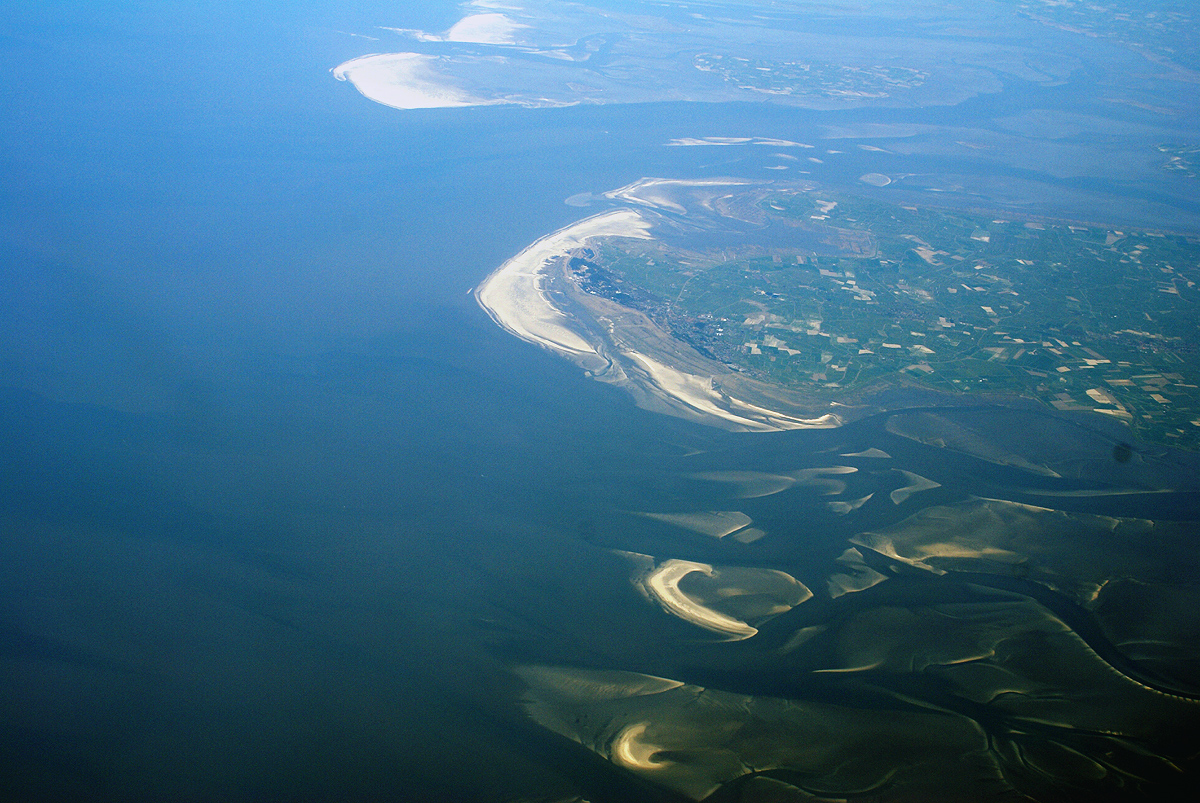
The German North Sea coast

The coastline of the North Sea has been evolving since the end of the last ice age. The coastline varies from fjords, river estuaries to mudflats.

The eastern and western coasts of the North Sea are jagged, as they were stripped by glaciers during the ice ages. The coastlines along the southernmost part are soft, covered with the remains of deposited glacial sediment, which was left directly by the ice or has been redeposited by the sea. The Norwegian mountains plunge into the sea, giving rise, north of Stavanger, to deep fjords and archipelagos. South of Stavanger, the coast softens, the islands become fewer. The eastern Scottish coast is similar, though less severe than Norway. Starting from Flamborough Head in the north east of England, the cliffs become lower and are composed of less resistant moraine, which erodes more easily, so that the coasts have more rounded contours. In the Netherlands, Belgium and in the east of England (East Anglia) the littoral is low and marshy. The east coast and south-east of the North Sea (Wadden Sea) have coastlines that are mainly sandy and straight owing to longshore currents, particularly along Belgium and Denmark.

== Northern fjords, skerries, and cliffs ==
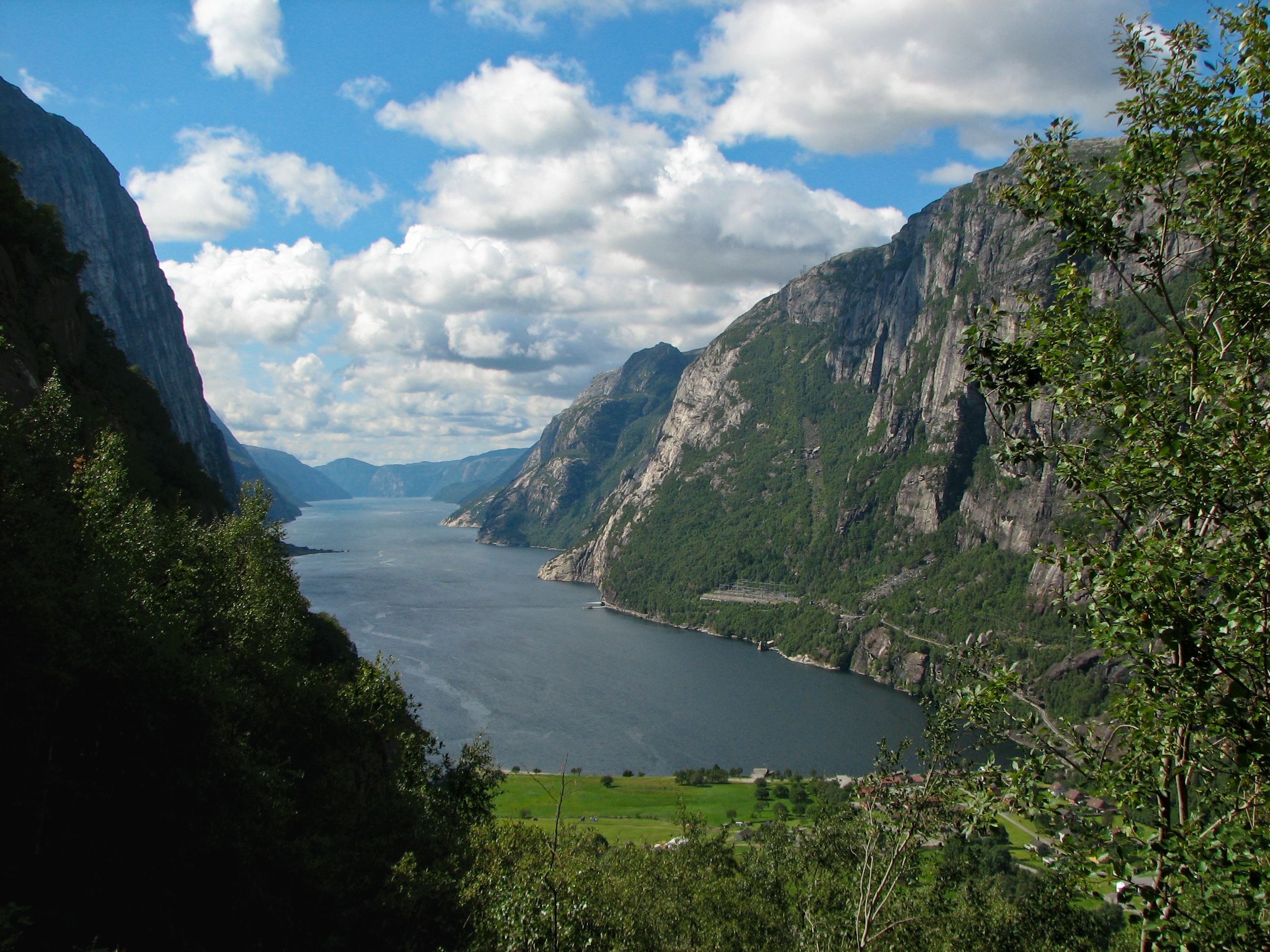
Lysefjord in Norway.

The northern North Sea coasts bear the impression of the enormous glaciers which covered them during the Ice Ages and created fjords, lakes and valleys along the coastline and landscape. Fjords arose by the action of glaciers, which dragged their way through them from the highlands, cutting and scraping deep trenches in the land. Fjords are particularly common on the coast of Norway.

Firths are similar to fjords, but are generally shallower with broader bays in which small islands may be found. The glaciers that formed them influenced the land over a wider area and scraped away larger areas. Firths are to be found on the Scottish coast. Individual islands in the firths, or islands and the coast, are often joined up by sandbars or spits made up of sand deposits known as "tombolos".

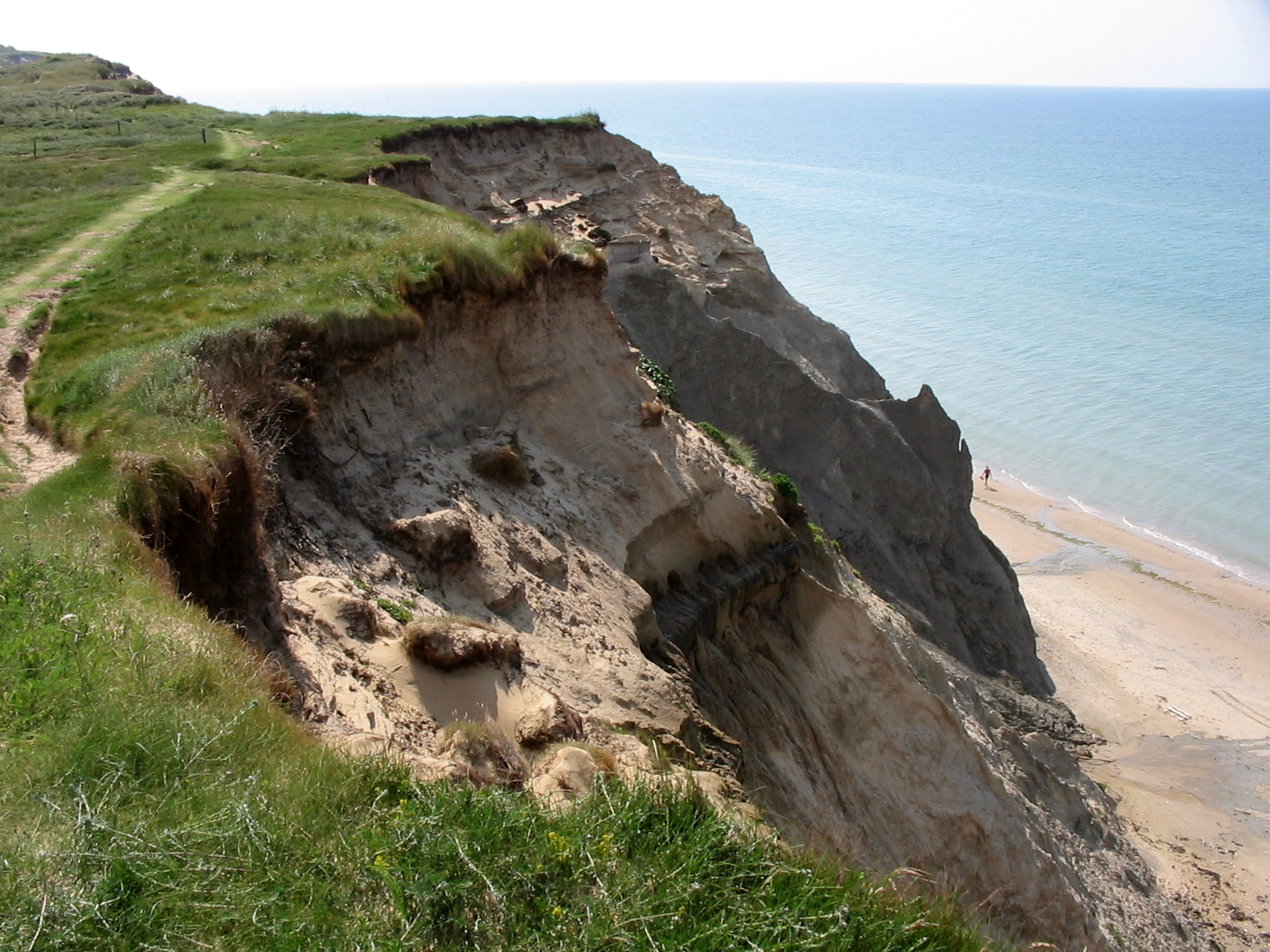
North Sea cliff

Towards the south the firths give way to a cliff coast, which was formed by the moraines of Ice Age glaciers. The horizontal impact of waves on the North Sea coast gives rise to eroded coasts. The cliff landscape is interrupted in southern England by large estuaries with their corresponding fringing marshes, notably the Humber and the Thames.

There are skerries in southern Norway formed by similar action to that which created the fjords and firths. The glaciers in these places affected the land to an even greater extent, so that large areas were scraped away. The coastal brim (Strandflaten), which is found especially in southern Norway, is a gently sloping lowland area between the sea and the mountains. It consists of plates of rock platforms, and often extends for kilometres, reaching under the sea, at a depth of only a few metres.

== Southern shoals and mudflats ==
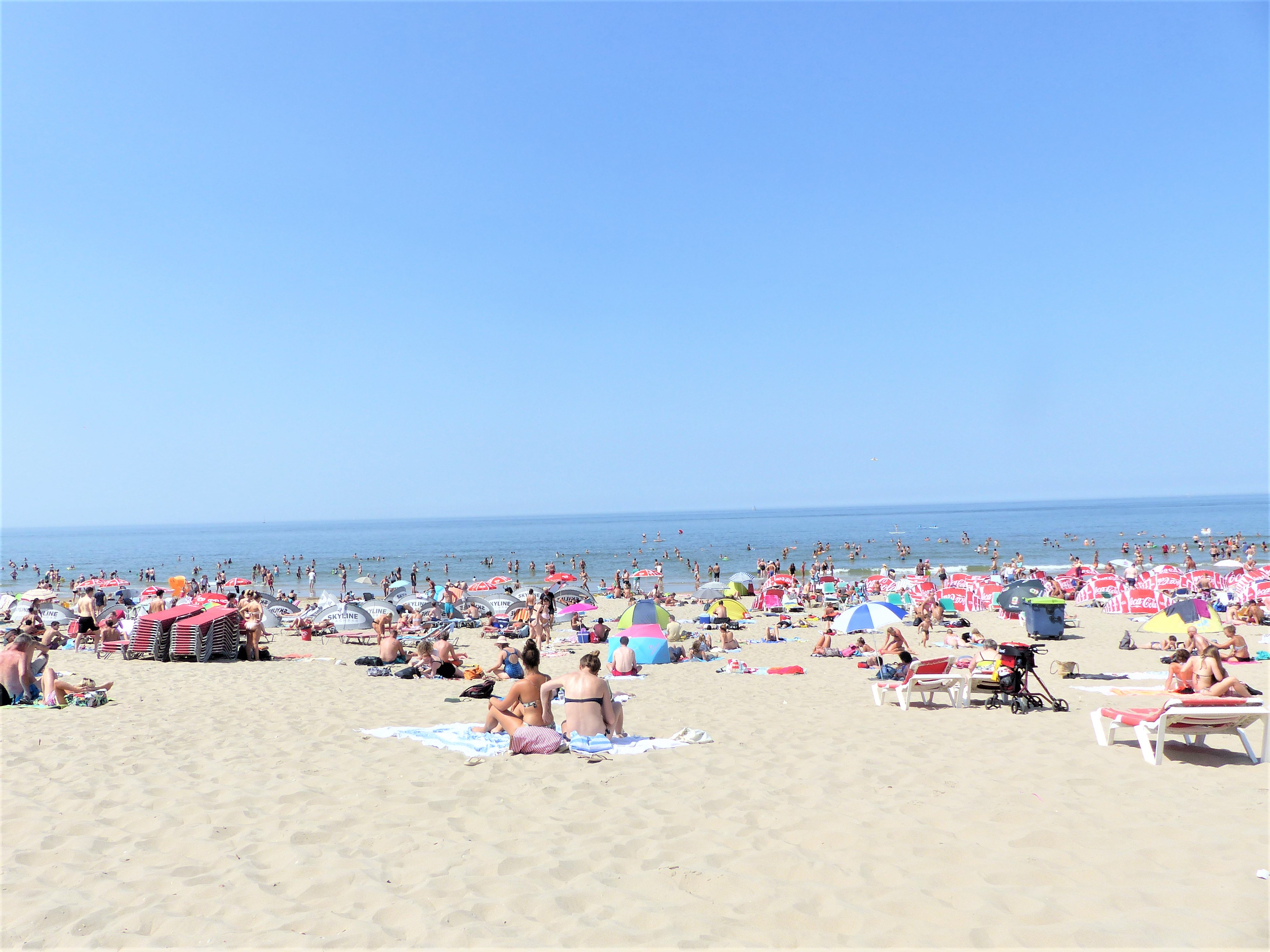
Seashore at Zandvoort aan Zee

The shallow-water coasts of the southern and eastern coast up to Denmark were formed by ice age activity, but their particular shape is determined for the most part by the sea and sediment deposits.

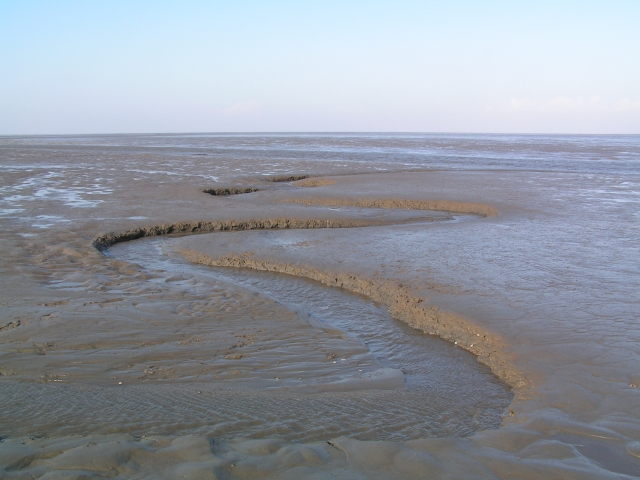
Mudflats in Germany

The Wadden Sea stretches between Esbjerg, Denmark in the north and Den Helder, Netherlands in the west. This landscape is heavily influenced by the tides and important sections of it have been declared a National Park. The whole of the coastal zone is shallow; the tides flood large areas and uncover them again, constantly depositing sediments. The Southern Bight has been especially changed by land reclamation, as the Dutch have been especially active. The largest project of this type was the diking and reclamation of the IJsselmeer.

Tidal forces have formed the Frisian Islands. In the micro tidal area, (a tidal range of up to 1.35 meters (4.4 ft), such as on the Dutch or Danish coasts, barrier beaches with dunes are formed. In the mesotidal area (a tidal range of between 1.35 and 2.9 m (4.4 and 9.5 ft)), barrier islands are formed; in the macrotidal area (above 2.9 meters (9.5 ft) tidal range), intertidal deposits raise the spring tide range 4 meters (13 ft). A soft rock coast is formed in the meso-macro tidal areas located in the southern North Sea. These soft rock coastal bedrock plains are interspersed with soft rock (shale and sandstone) cliffs.

The small, historically strategic island of Heligoland was not formed by recent sediment deposition; it is considerably older and is composed of early Triassic sandstone.

== See also ==
- Coastal management of the North Sea
- Coastline of the United Kingdom
- Geology of the North Sea
- List of rivers of Europe
- North Sea Trail
- Storm tides of the North Sea
