= Langeby =

Beach in Sandefjord, Norway

Coordinates: 59°04′41″N 10°15′42″E

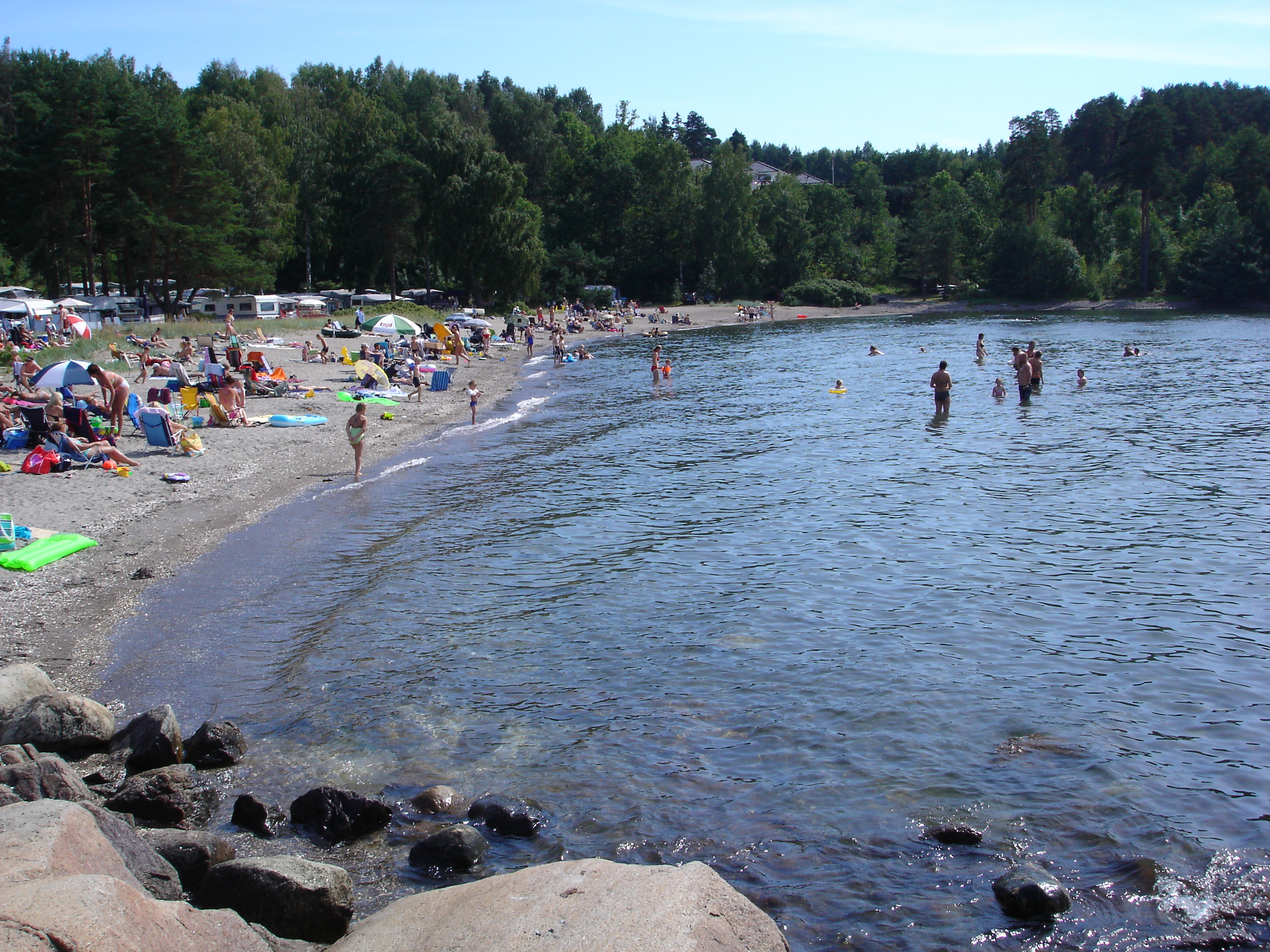
Langeby beach.

Langeby is a beach at West Island (Vesterøya) in Sandefjord Municipality in Norway. It is described as the city's best beach by both Frommer's- and Fodor's Travel Guides. Besides its 150 metres (490 ft) sandy beach, it is home to Langeby Camping which offers boat- and kayak rentals. Langeby has a convenience store and piers used for fishing and boats. The beach has sloping rocks, a floating platform, diving boards, and showers. There is also a playground as well as a soccer field and volleyball court.

Langeby attracts thousands of visitors every summer. It lies near Vøra, a beach and campground which attracts summer visitors and vacationers from throughout the country. A coastal path known as Kyststien connects Langeby to Vøra. Near Vesterøyveien between the two beaches are remains from the Stone Age, discovered at an area 23 metres (75 ft) from the ocean. Many archeological artifacts have been retrieved from this location. Tent camping is permitted on numerous nearby islets, including the 11 acres (4.5 ha) Hellesøya and 12 acres (4.9 ha) Buerøya. A nearby uninhabited island, Hellesøya, was purchased by the city in 1934 to become a public recreation area. Hellesøya Island is home to a campground, sandy beach, and a boat pier.

The beach was purchased and acquired by the city in 1958.

== Etymology ==
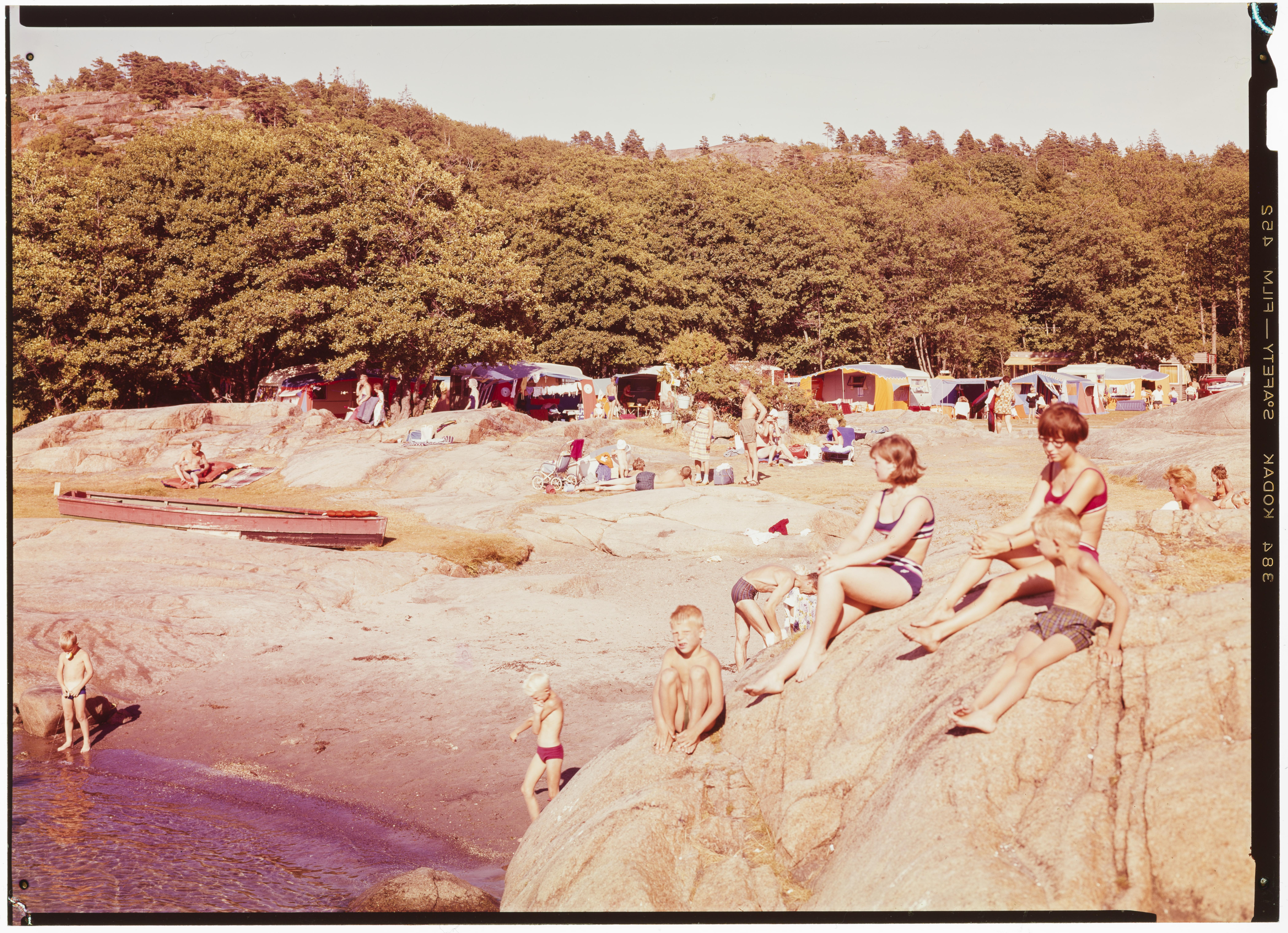
Langeby in 1966

Formerly known as Langibyr, it was pronounced Langabø until 1398 but got its current spelling in 1539. The name Langeby derives from “the long farm”.

== History ==
Archeological discoveries have found evidence for prehistoric settlements at Auve, immediately south of Langeby, dating to the Stone Age between 5,400 and 4,900 years ago.

Langeby has been a swimming destination since at least 1398. A number of farms were previously located around Langeby on West Island, but all agricultural activity ended in 1960. Langeby Pier was previously the main public pier for West Island, where many fishermen kept their vessels.

Camping at Langeby was first established by Olaf Olsen Langeby in 1934-35. Langeby Camping is now a company offering 12 rental apartments and 140 spaces for RV's, tents, and camping trailers. The campsites are no longer than 80 metres (260 ft) at most from the ocean. Besides its two sandy beaches, Langeby has 400 metres (1,300 ft) of sloping rocks. It is situated at West Island, 7 kilometres (4.3 mi) from the city centre.

The beach was purchased by the municipality of Sandefjord on February 26, 1958.

The prestigious headquarters of Bjørn Hansen AS is located in a villa near Langeby and is shielded by forest on one side and unrestricted views of Sandefjord on the other.
