= Jim Wilson (producer) =

American film producer

Jim Wilson is a film producer. He won the Academy Award for Best Picture for Dances With Wolves (1990).

== Career ==
=== Producing ===
In 1990, Wilson produced Dances With Wolves. It was adapted by Michael Blake, based on his novel. It grossed $424.2 million worldwide and was nominated for Academy Awards, winning seven.

Following Dances With Wolves, Wilson produced The Bodyguard in 1992, starring Kevin Costner and Whitney Houston. Released by Warner Bros. the film grossed $410.9 million worldwide. The soundtrack is the best-selling soundtrack in film history, selling over 44 million copies worldwide. It won the Grammy for Album of the Year.

Wilson has continued to produce films, including Wyatt Earp, The Postman, and Message in a Bottle. For television, Wilson executive-produced the award-winning 8-hour mini-series 500 Nations for CBS.

=== Directing ===
In addition to producing studio fare, Wilson has directed numerous features, including Stacy's Knights starring Kevin Costner, Head Above Water with Cameron Diaz and Harvey Keitel, Whirlygirl with Monet Mazur and a feature-length documentary Laffit – All About Winning.

In 2014, he finished 50 to 1, based on the true story of Mine That Bird, and his unlikely win in the 2009 Kentucky Derby. The film was released theatrically and acquired by Sony Pictures in 2015 for all worldwide rights.

== Filmography ==
He was producer for all films unless otherwise noted.

=== Film ===
| Year | Film | Credit | Ref. |
|---|---|---|---|
| 1983 | Stacy's Knights | Executive producer | |
| 1986 | Smart Alec | | |
| 1990 | Revenge | Associate producer | |
| 1990 | Dances with Wolves | | |
| 1992 | The Bodyguard | | |
| 1994 | Rapa-Nui | | |
| 1994 | Wyatt Earp | | |
| 1996 | Head Above Water | | |
| 1997 | The Postman | | |
| 1999 | Message in a Bottle | | |
| 2006 | Whirlygirl | | |
| 2007 | Mr. Brooks | | |
| 2008 | Swing Vote | | |
| 2014 | 50 to 1 | | |

As director

| Year | Film |
|---|---|
| 1983 | Stacy's Knights |
| 1986 | Smart Alec |
| 1996 | Head Above Water |
| 2006 | Whirlygirl |
| 2014 | 50 to 1 |

As an actor

| Year | Film | Role | Notes |
|---|---|---|---|
| 1990 | Dances with Wolves | Doctor | Uncredited |
| 1994 | Wyatt Earp | Doctor for Virgil Earp | Uncredited |

As writer

| Year | Film |
|---|---|
| 1986 | Smart Alec |
| 2014 | 50 to 1 |

=== Television ===
| Year | Title | Credit | Notes |
|---|---|---|---|
| 1990−91 | Hey Dude | Associate producer | |
| 1995 | 500 Nations | | Documentary |
