= Stacy's Knights =

- Directed by: Jim Wilson
- Written by: Michael Blake
- Produced by: Ann Locktov; Freddy Sweet
- Starring: Kevin Costner
- Cinematography: Joao Fernandes (credited as Raul Lomas)
- Edited by: Bonnie Koehler
- Music by: Norton Buffalo
- Release date: June 1983
- Running time: 100 minutes
- Country: United States
- Language: English

Stacy's Knights is a 1983 American film directed by Jim Wilson.

The film is also known as Double Down, The Touch (American video title), Winning Streak (British video title).

== Plot summary ==
Stacy (Andra Millian), a timid woman, is learning how to play blackjack and meets Will (Kevin Costner) who coaches her in card counting. When she is successful at a casino in Reno, Nevada, the corrupt casino management assigns a cheating dealer to stop her and eventually they have Will killed. In retaliation, Stacy recruits a team of players and trains them to win at the game. The team returns to the casino, with Stacy in disguise, to avenge Will's death by winning a large amount of money.

== Cast ==
- Kevin Costner as Will Bonner
- Andra Millian as Stacy Lancaster
- Eve Lilith as Jean Dennison
- Mike Reynolds as Shecky Poole
- Garth Howard as Mr. C.
- Ed Semenza as The Kid
- Don Hackstaff as Lawyer
- Loyd Catlett as Buster
- Cheryl Ferris as Marion
- Gary Tilles as Rudy
- Roge Roush as Rollin
- John Brevick as Floor Boss
- Robin Landis as Bourbon Drinker
- Shashawnee Hall as Recruit
- Robert Conder as Recruit
- Frederick Hughes as Recruit
- Steve Noonan as Make-Up Man
- David Brevick as Rejected Recruit
- Steve Kopanke as Video Tech #1
- Jim Kosub as Video Tech #2
- Ray Whittey as Frisker
- Roy Reeves as Dealer
- Tena Knox as Dealer
- Joanne Lisosky as Dealer
- Theresa Thompson as Dealer
- Mark Conrad as Dealer
- Pete Borsz as Dealer
- Dennis Pflederer as Security Man
- Jay Conder as Pit Boss
- John Coinman as Stiff

== Soundtrack ==
- "Good Things" Performed by Vicki Randle, written by John Lawrence, co-writer with J. Lawrence, Ken Hilton.
