= Mefjorden =

Fjord in Vestfold, Norway

- Mefjord (unofficial)
- Interactive map of the fjord
- Location: Vestfold county, Norway
- Coordinates: 59.09333°N 10.27802°E
- Type: Fjord
- Primary outflows: Ytre Oslofjord
- Basin countries: Norway
- Max. length: 9 kilometres (5.6 mi)
- Max. width: 1.6 kilometres (0.99 mi)

Mefjorden is a small fjord in Sandefjord Municipality in Vestfold county, Norway. The 9-kilometre (5.6 mi) long fjord lies in-between two long, narrow peninsulas: Vesterøya and Østerøya. It is a narrow fjord with many minor islands and islets.

== Tourism ==
There are many, many vacation homes on both sides of the fjord. Additionally, there is a large campground, Strand Leirsted, that is located on its east side. Several islands in the fjord are also home to vacation homes, including Grindholmen, Storholmen, and Brattholmen islands.

== History ==
The fjord was historically known as Midtfjorden (lit. 'the middle fjord'). During the Viking Age, a royal lodge (kongsseter) was located at Gokstad at the innermost part of the fjord. It is also the fjord used when burying Olav Geirstadr-Alv and the Gokstad Ship in the 9th century.

== See also ==
- List of Norwegian fjords
