= Head Above Water (film) =

- Promotional film poster
- Directed by: Jim Wilson
- Screenplay by: Theresa Marie
- Based on: Hodet over vannet by Nils Gaup
- Produced by: John M. Jacobsen; Jim Wilson
- Starring: Harvey Keitel; Cameron Diaz; Craig Sheffer; Billy Zane
- Cinematography: Richard Bowen
- Edited by: Michael R. Miller
- Music by: Christopher Young
- Production companies: Tig Productions; Majestic Films
- Distributed by: Fine Line Features
- Release dates: November 7, 1996 (Norway); June 25, 1997 (United States)
- Running time: 92 minutes
- Country: United States
- Language: English
- Box office: $32,212

Head Above Water is a 1996 American black comedy thriller film directed by Jim Wilson and starring Harvey Keitel, Cameron Diaz, Craig Sheffer and Billy Zane. The film is a remake of Hodet over vannet by Norwegian film director Nils Gaup.

== Plot ==
Newlyweds Nathalie and George are spending their vacation at her family's remote island beach house in Maine. Lance, who has known Nathalie since childhood, looks after the place. George goes on an overnight fishing trip with Lance to get to know him better.

Meanwhile, Nathalie's ex-boyfriend Kent arrives at the house, seemingly unannounced. He says that his girlfriend Evelyn recently left him because of his drinking problem. While Nathalie is in the bathroom, Kent grabs a bottle of vodka from George's supply. He makes a pass at her, while drinking directly from the bottle. The evening ends with him passing out on her marital bed. Waking up on the sofa, Nathalie discovers Kent dead, apparently from alcohol poisoning.

Panicked, Nathalie hides Kent's naked body in the cellar. When George returns from his fishing trip, she acts as though nothing has happened. However, George eventually notices that the cellar hatch under the dining table is not completely closed. George stomps on the floorboard and corrects the problem. George later finds the flowers and chocolate that Kent brought. She admits that he came on a surprise visit while George was on his fishing trip, and that she put his body in the cellar.

They take the body to the nearby tool shed, debating what to do. The situation is further complicated because Kent's clothes are missing and his neck was broken when George stomped on the cellar hatch. George's being a prominent judge and Nathalie's history of pill addiction make him feel that they must dispose of the body themselves.

While the two decide to dispose of Kent's body in the ocean by weighing him down with an old stove, Lance arrives, and the two are forced to rethink their plans. Nathalie and George return home. There, George discovers that Kent's bottle was actually not (ethyl) alcohol but poisonous methanol (methyl alcohol). George concludes that Kent's death resulted from his heart problems and methanol poisoning. Nathalie later goes for a swim.

Returning from her swim, Nathalie notices Kent's white linen suit drying on the porch of Lance's house. She insists on taking the suit to clean it. Believing that she has found a solution to their problem, Nathalie looks for George to tell him the good news. She spots George at the partially built oceanfront gazebo. He has apparently already embedded Kent's dismembered body into the concrete steps. Horrified, Nathalie runs but is captured by George. After taking her back to the house, tying and gagging her, George goes out to finish the job. Nathalie frees herself, goes to Lance and explains the situation. At Lance's house, Nathalie discovers a postcard Kent had sent her. Lance says that he meant to give it to her but forgot.

Nathalie then believes that Lance knew Kent was coming all along and switched the alcohol to kill him. Horrified, she runs to George, believing that he has been an unwitting pawn in Lance's murder plot. Lance, protesting his innocence, follows Nathalie outside to the beach. Lance and Nathalie are eventually confronted by George, who ends up shooting Lance. Nathalie runs but is captured by George again. He has been drinking heavily but manages to cement Nathalie's legs in a metal container on the gazebo platform.

George starts to have trouble walking and says that he cannot see. Nathalie realizes that George has unknowingly drunk the tainted liquor and that Kent really did die of a heart attack. Disoriented, George falls from the gazebo platform into the sea and is impaled by a spire knocked loose by Nathalie's efforts to free herself. She is eventually rescued by a passing beach patrol boat.

Nathalie is later in her own boat telling the beach patrolman her story. When his colleague asks for a beverage, she tells him to check in the cooler under the seat. Unbeknownst to Nathalie, George had added some of Nathalie's medication to the water bottle the patrolman is about to drink.

== Cast ==
- Harvey Keitel as George
- Cameron Diaz as Nathalie
- Craig Sheffer as Lance
- Billy Zane as Kent Draper
- Shay Duffin as Policeman

== Reception ==
Head Above Water holds a rating of 40% on Rotten Tomatoes based on 15 reviews.

Marc Savlov of The Austin Chronicle gave a positive review, calling Diaz "a terrific comedienne, all fluttery gestures and cockeyed charm". He added, "Keitel likewise sustains a single comic note throughout without wearing it too thin. As George starts to drink heavily and fall apart at the seams, Keitel tosses some of his trademark nastiness into the mix and the film really takes off. It's not a classic by any stretch of the imagination -- Head Above Water is simply too thin for that -- but it is an endearingly black comedy, with more than enough grisly chuckles to keep it afloat over its ricocheting 92-minute course."

In the Los Angeles Times, Jack Mathews said, "These kind of keep-the-audience-guessing whodunits depend on the dialogue and the actors' chemistry, and 'Head Above Water' fails both tests. Keitel is badly miscast as the comically jealous husband; Sheffer…doesn't begin to convey the mystery implied by Lance; and Diaz, while clearly talented at light comedy, is stuck in the middle, sputtering in confusion over which is the better man."

In The New York Times, Stephen Holden wrote, "Director Jim Wilson's approach to this material is fatally indecisive. One moment, 'Head Above Water' plays like a clanking melodrama, the next like a gallows comedy of corrupt yuppie manners. By the time the movie builds to a climactic sight gag involving two boats, a chain saw and a can of cement, the movie has lost its moorings and gone hopelessly adrift."
