= Skjellvika =

Beach in Vestfold, Norway

Coordinates: 59°07′00″N 10°17′32″E

Skjellvika is a lagoon and one of the most visited beaches in Sandefjord Municipality, Vestfold, Norway. It has the most shallow waters of any beach in town, furthermore, it has one of the city’s purest sea water quality. It is situated at East Island. It lies by the Lahellefjord and is owned and maintained by the municipality of Sandefjord. It lies one kilometer south of Lahelle. The oceans off Skjellvika are used for ice-fishing during winter months.

Skjellvika is home to a convenience store, diving boards, floating platforms, numerous sloping rocks, and a mountainside pier which follows the ocean. It is considered a child-friendly beach with its shallow waters. It is located 5.5 km (3.1 mi.) from the Sandefjord city center.

The nearby area is home to numerous seaside cabins and vacation homes.

There are several nearby hiking trails, including a 9 km (5.5 mi.) trail to Tønsberg Barrell, which sits at the southern tip of East Island. The trip can be made shorter by stopping at Flautangen Beach, which is 4.5 km (2.8 mi.) from Skjellvika. Tønsberg Barrel has been named the most beautiful place in Sandefjord.

Numerous islets can be found nearby, including Møyern, Natholmen, Fornet, and Marøyskjæra.

The beach was purchased and acquired by the city in the early 1940s through the work of Mayor Frithjof Holtedahl.

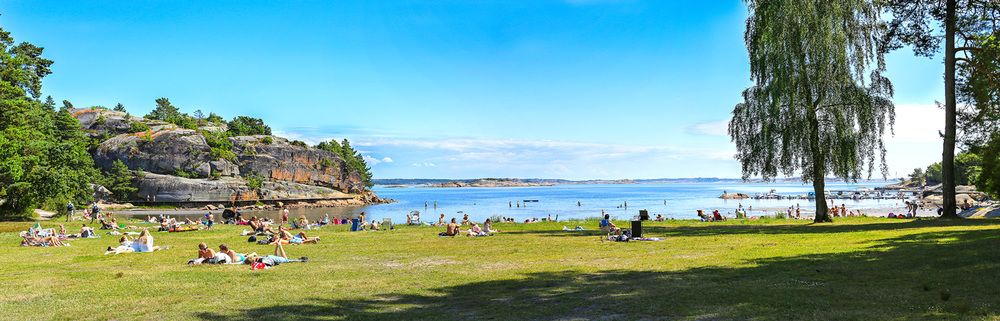
Skjellvika Beach during summer.
