= Dances With Wolves (novel) =

Novel by Michael Blake

- Author: Michael Blake
- Language: English
- Genre: Historical fiction
- Publication date: 1988
- Publication place: United States
- Media type: Print
- Pages: 304

Dances With Wolves is a 1988 American Civil War novel by Michael Blake. Originally written as an unsold spec script, it was converted into a novel at the behest of Kevin Costner; it was adapted into a film of the same name, directed by Costner, in 1990.

Set during the Civil War, the protagonist, U.S. Army Lieutenant John Dunbar, is sent to establish an outpost in the unsettled West but finds himself stranded when his wagoner is killed. Isolated and increasingly haunted by his memories of war, Dunbar abandons his post and settles with a tribe of Comanche people he has befriended, soon taking the name "Dances With Wolves". The novel and the film later came under criticism for similarity to Elliot Silverstein's A Man Called Horse (based on Dorothy M. Johnson's story).

On September 4, 2001, Michael Blake published The Holy Road, a sequel to Dances With Wolves; the story is set eleven years later, and deals with the increasing conflict between the Plains Indians and the white man, with tragic outcomes.
