= Michael Blake (author) =

American writer (1945–2015)

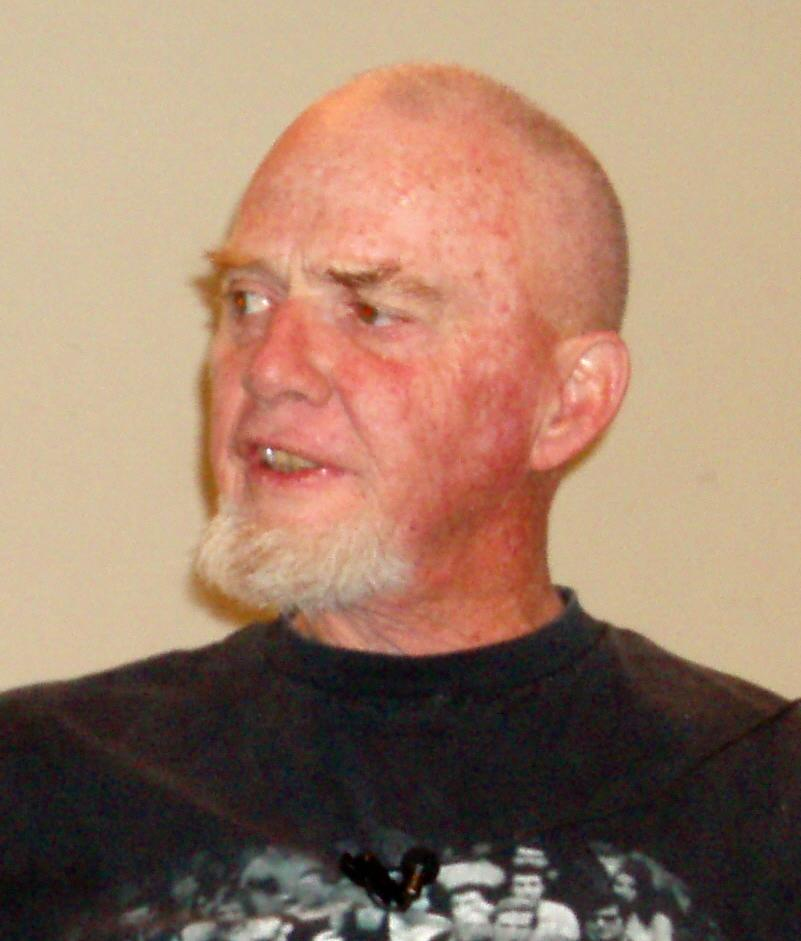
- Blake in 2005
- Born: Michael Lennox Blake; July 5, 1945; Fort Bragg, North Carolina, U.S.
- Died: May 2, 2015 (aged 69); Tucson, Arizona, U.S.
- Education: University of New Mexico; Eastern New Mexico University
- Occupations: Author; screenwriter

Michael Lennox Blake (July 5, 1945 – May 2, 2015) was an American author, best known for the film adaptation of his novel Dances With Wolves, for which he won an Academy Award for Best Adapted Screenplay.

== Biography ==
Early in his life, Blake's family lived in Texas, before moving to Southern California, where they moved frequently. He began writing while serving in the U.S. Air Force during the Vietnam War when he was stationed at Walker Air Force Base, where he wrote for the base newspaper. He studied journalism at the University of New Mexico, and later studied at a film school in Berkeley, California. He also attended Eastern New Mexico University in Portales. In the late 1970s, he moved to Los Angeles; during the 1980s, only one of his screenplays was produced, called Stacy's Knights (1983) which starred Kevin Costner, who later encouraged him to continue to write, and introduced him to key figures in the Hollywood Industry. Dances with Wolves was the result; Kevin Costner then asked him to write a screenplay for the film based on the novel.

Blake died on May 2, 2015, after a long illness in Tucson, Arizona.

== Works ==
=== Screenplays ===
- Stacy's Knights (1983)
- Dances with Wolves (1990)
- Winding Stair (1998) also directed
- The One (unfinished)
- The Holy Road (unfinished)
- Winnetou (unfinished)

=== Novels ===
- Dances with Wolves (1988) Fawcett Gold Medal ISBN 0-449-13448-2
- Airman Mortensen (1991) Seven Wolves Publishing ISBN 0-9627387-7-8
- Marching to Valhalla (1996) Villard Books ISBN 0-679-44864-0
- The Holy Road (2001) Villard Books ISBN 0-679-44866-7
- Into the Stars (2011) ZOVA Books ISBN 978-0-615-51053-8

=== Non-fiction ===
- Like a Running Dog (2002) (autobiography)
- Indian Yell (2006)
- Twelve the King (2009)

== Awards ==
- Academy Award for Best Writing (Adapted Screenplay)
- Golden Globe Award for Best Screenplay
- Writers Guild of America Award for Best Screenplay Based on Material from Another Medium
- Spur Award for Best Motion Picture
- Animal Protection Institute’s Humanitarian of the Year
- Air Force Sergeants Association’s Americanism Award (1992)
