= North Sea Trail =

Hiking trail in northern Europe

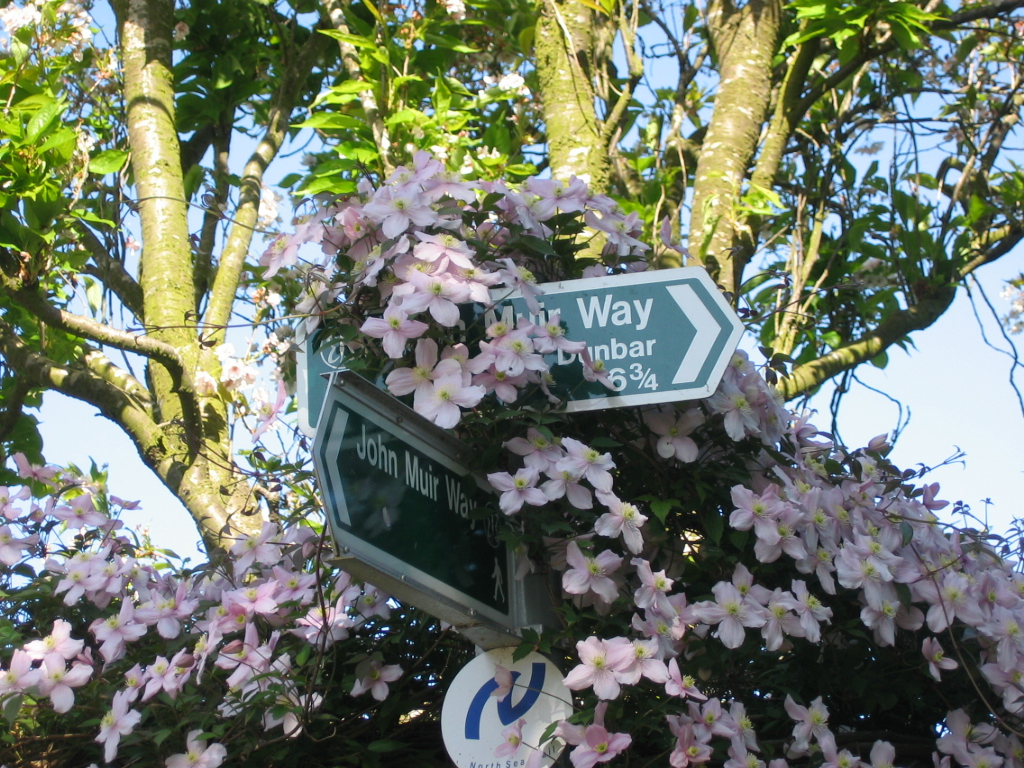
- John Muir Way fingerposts and North Sea Trail logo "N" below
- Length: 4,900 km (3,000 mi)
- Location: North Sea coasts
- Use: Hiking

The North Sea Trail is a transnational long-distance hiking trail along the coast of the North Sea. The route passes through seven countries and 26 partner areas. The aim of the project is to promote sustainable tourism and to keep alive the common cultural heritage of the North Sea countries. The trail has a theoretical total length of about 4,900 kilometres (3,000 mi), but so far only about 3,700 kilometres (2,300 mi) have been developed.

The EU-funded North Sea Trail project involves Sweden, Norway, Scotland, England, the Netherlands, Denmark, and Germany.

== Route ==
The trail starts in the north of Great Britain in Scotland and stretches along the entire east coast. The trail continues along the Dutch and German coasts to Denmark. Denmark is rounded out and the path on the west coast of Sweden continued from Kattegat to the Skagerrak. The trail then stretches along the Norwegian coast.

Only the Netherlands and Denmark offer a completed developed route. In Germany, the path is largely unknown and not signposted. On some short sections, the North Sea Trail is identical to the European long-distance path E9. On some sections, the North Sea Trail is identical to the better known North Sea Cycle Route.

== Member countries ==
The seven countries are:

- Denmark
  - Partner areas: Djursland, Thy, North Jutland, Sjælland
- England
  - Partner areas: Northumberland, North York Moors
- Germany
  - Partner areas: Karrharde
- Netherlands
  - Partner areas: Dutch Coastal Path (Lange-Afstands-Wandelpad 5), passing through the provinces of Zeeland, South Holland, North Holland, Friesland and Groningen
- Norway
  - Partner areas: Sogn og Fjordane, Hordaland, Rogaland, Vest-Agder, Vestfold, Møre og Romsdal, Østfold
- Scotland
  - Partner areas: Aberdeen City, Aberdeenshire, East Lothian (John Muir Way), Fife, and Moray Firth
- Sweden
  - Partner areas: Western Götaland, Halland, Scania (Skåneleden)

== North Sea Trail Association ==
The project was originally part funded by the European Union through its Interreg IIIB North Sea Programme.

The project partners have decided to establish a North Sea Trail Association so that the Trail can be supported in the long term. The UK's representative on the Association is Aberdeen.

There is also a North Sea Cycle Route integrated with the North Sea Trail.

== Gallery ==
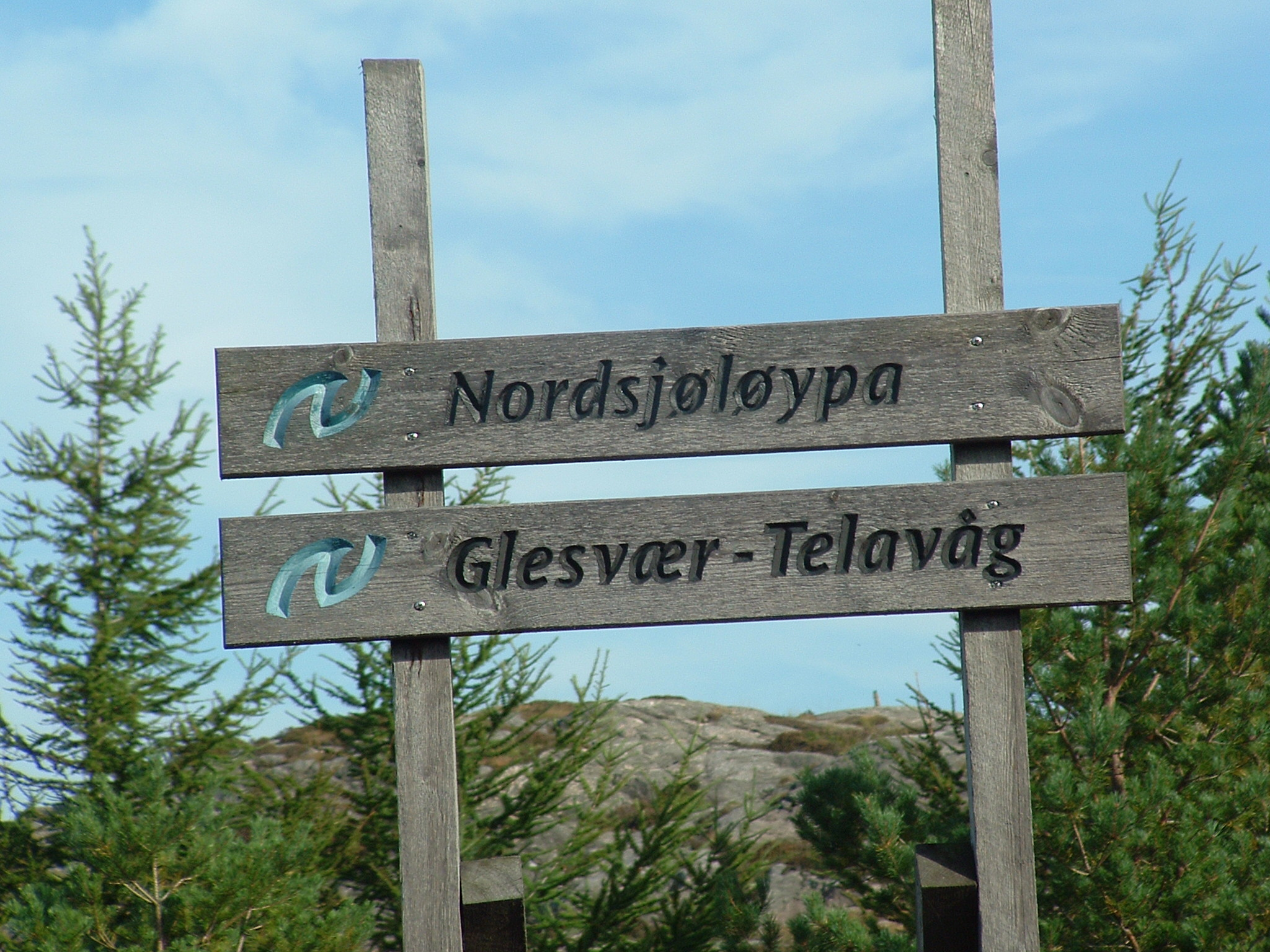
Directional signs near Sotra for the North Sea Trail

Path marker on boardwalk 'Nave Nortrail' coastal path.

== See also ==
- Coastline of the North Sea
- List of long-distance footpaths
- Long-distance footpaths in the United Kingdom

== Resources ==
- Aberdeen City's North Sea Trail leaflet
- Aberdeenshire Council's series of 38 downloadable maps and leaflets
- Welcome to the Moray Firth Trail
