= James Cook University =

Public university in North Queensland, Australia

- Coat of arms
- Former names: University College of Townsville (1961–1970); James Cook University of North Queensland (1970–1998)
- Motto: Latin: Crescente Luce
- Motto in English: "Light ever increasing"
- Type: Public research university
- Established: 1961 (university college); 1970 (university status)
- Accreditation: TEQSA
- Academic affiliations: Innovative Research Universities (IRU)
- Budget: A$648 million (2023)
- Chancellor: Ngaire Brown
- Vice-Chancellor: Simon Biggs
- Students: 21,207 (2023)
- Undergraduates: 13,098 (2021)
- Postgraduates: 5,193 (2021)
- Location: 1 James Cook Drive, Townsville, Queensland, 4814, Australia and Singapore; 19°19′40″S 146°45′30″E
- Campus: Urban, parkland and regional with multiple sites
- Named after: James Cook
- Colours: Blue Gold
- Sporting affiliations: UniSport; EAEN
- Mascots: James; Koalion
- Website: jcu.edu.au

James Cook University (JCU) is a public university in North Queensland, Australia. The second oldest university in Queensland, JCU is a teaching and research institution. The university's main campuses are located in the tropical cities of Cairns and Townsville, and one in the city state of Singapore. JCU also has study centres in Mount Isa, Mackay, Thursday Island and Rockhampton. A Brisbane campus delivers undergraduate and postgraduate courses to international students. The university's main fields of research include environmental sciences, biological sciences, mathematical sciences, earth sciences, agricultural and veterinary sciences, technology and medical and health sciences.

== History ==
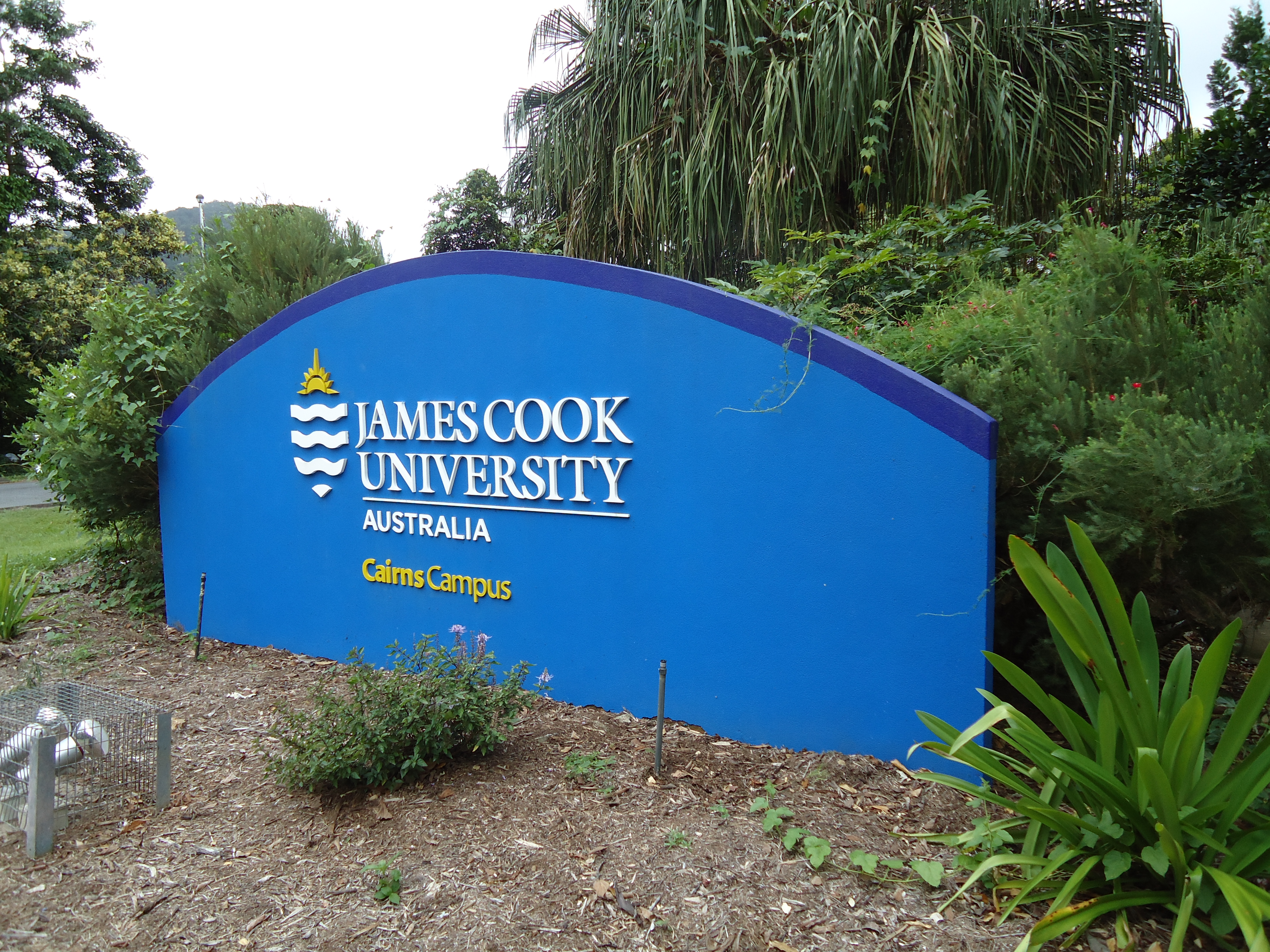
James Cook University, Cairns

In 1957, Professor John Douglas Story, vice chancellor of the University of Queensland, proposed a regional university college be established to cater to the people of North Queensland. At that time, the only higher education providers were located in the state capital, Brisbane. On 27 February 1961, the University College of Townsville was opened.

The university became the James Cook University of North Queensland with the passage of an act by the Queensland Parliament. It was assented by Queen Elizabeth II herself on 20 April 1970 during a royal visit to Queensland, with the Queen also officially opening the university.

In 2020, James Cook University celebrated its 50th anniversary with a Treasures exhibition, showcasing 50 collection items from Special Collections, Eddie Koiki Mabo Library, James Cook University, Townsville.

The rare collection item – 'James Cook University Development: Pimlico to the First Chancellor archival footage, 1960 – 1970' was one of the Treasures selected for the anniversary year. The 12min film preserved on NQHeritage, the University Library's Special Collections online repository, shows footage of Her Majesty Queen Elizabeth II arriving at the official ceremony and being introduced to the official party. Their Royal Highnesses first appear in the film at 6:06 minutes.

The namesake is British sea captain James Cook, who is best known for being the first European to explore the eastern coast of Australia. A year after JCU's proclamation, Cyclone Althea struck the Townsville region. This, together with the destruction caused by Cyclone Tracy in Darwin 1974, prompted the establishment of a cyclone research facility. The Cyclone Testing Station started out as a small project of Professor Hugh Trollope and began its operations on 1 November 1977 as James Cook Cyclone Structural Testing Station. Its name was later changed to The Cyclone Testing Station in 2002. The Cyclone Testing Station operates as a self funded unit of the College of Science, Technology and Engineering.

On 1 January 1982, JCU amalgamated with The Townsville College of Advanced Education located adjacent to the main campus in Douglas. The university established a campus in Cairns in 1987 which moved to its current location in the suburb of Smithfield in 1995. On 1 January 1991, the School of Art and Design of the Townsville College of TAFE was transferred to JCU. The current name of James Cook University became official on 1 January 1998. In 2003 the university opened an international campus in Singapore. The university further expanded its presence by establishing another campus in Brisbane, Queensland in 2006.

JCU Singapore moved campuses in February 2015. The Hon. Tony Abbott MP, Prime Minister of Australia officially opened the new JCU Singapore campus at 149 Sims Drive on 28 June 2015. In 2015, JCU opened the JCU Townsville City campus. In 2017, JCU opened the JCU Cairns, Bada-jali campus in Cairns CBD.

JCU celebrated its 50th anniversary on 20 April 2020. To honour Aboriginal and Torres Strait Islander peoples' continuing contribution to the university, JCU gave Indigenous names to a number of its locations:

- The Townsville (Douglas) campus was named Bebegu Yumba, meaning 'Place of Learning' in the Birri-Gubba language.
- The Cairns (Smithfield) campus was named Nguma-bada, meaning 'Place for tomorrow's learning, knowledge and wisdom' from the Yirrgay (Yirrganydji) coastal dialect of Djabugay.
- The Cairns City campus has been named Bada-jali, meaning 'Flowering of the Cocky Apple tree: Place and time for new beginnings and growth', from the Yirrgay (Yirrganydji) coastal dialect of Djabugay.
- The Mount Isa campus was named Murtupuni, meaning 'to come together, gather together' in the Kalkadoon language.
- The Mackay campus was named Ngudya Yamba, meaning 'place of knowledge' in the Yuwi language.

An Indigenous language name is still to be announced for the JCU Thursday Island campus.

In the early hours of 4 April 2019, a large fire broke out in the A Wing of University Hall requiring the evacuation of over 200 students. There were no serious injuries, although several students were treated for smoke inhalation. Immediately following the fire, the university rushed to find emergency housing for the residents affected. The renovation of the closed Clark Wing at St. Mark's College and construction of the new 'The Village' housing precinct began, and provided replacement housing for all residents from the A and B Wings of University Hall.

== Campuses and buildings ==
James Cook University operates three main campuses, located in the tropical cities of Cairns and Townsville in Australia, and the international city of Singapore. JCU's Brisbane campus offers courses for international students. The university also operates study centres in Mackay, Mount Isa, Thursday Island and Rockhampton. These study centres provide programs and support for students living in rural and remote areas.

=== JCU Cairns, Nguma-bada Campus, Smithfield ===
JCU's Cairns, Nguma-bada campus is located 15 kilometres north of the Cairns central business district, in the suburb of Smithfield. JCU moved to this location from its original inner-city site in 1995. About 3,000 students study at JCU Cairns, Nguma-bada campus, Smithfield, including 335 international students. Located on the campus grounds are the Australian Tropical Herbarium, JCU Dental and The Cairns Institute.

The JCU Ideas Lab was completed in July, 2020. The $30M eco-friendly building brings together students, staff and community entrepreneurs to progress Internet of Things Engineering and data science. In 2023, the first cohort of Medicine students commenced in Cairns.

A second campus, JCU Cairns, Bada-jali campus, is located in Cairns' CBD. The campus delivers a diverse range of progressive facilities and services for the university.

=== JCU Townsville, Bebegu Yumba Campus, Douglas ===
JCU's Townsville, Bebegu Yumba campus is the university's largest campus and is located on 386 hectares in the suburb of Douglas, near the army base and the lee of Mount Stuart. Originally located in the suburb of Pimlico, the university moved to its current site in 1967. Over 10,000 students study at the JCU Townsville, Bebegu Yumba campus, including over 1,300 international students. Adjacent to the university is the Townsville Hospital.

The Discovery Rise project was announced in September 2007. The $1 billion project, aimed at redeveloping the university's Townsville campus, was completed in 2015. The Eddie Koiki Mabo Library (built in 1968 and extended in 1990) has received the 25 Year Architecture Award presented by the Royal Australian Institute of Architects – Queensland Chapter. It also has been recognised as one of Australia's ten most iconic buildings alongside structures as the Sydney Opera House and the Shrine of Remembrance in Melbourne, Victoria, Australia.

In 2015, the JCU Townsville City campus was opened in Townsville's CBD on Flinders Street. The campus delivers a diverse range of progressive facilities and services for the university, business and community organisations.

Construction of the Technology Innovation Complex (TIC) began in March 2021. The 94m, 9,400sqm facility "will be the centrepiece of an innovation hub in which undergraduate and post-graduate engineering and IT students, industry partners and researchers will converge and collaborate".

TropiQ, Townsville's Tropical Intelligence and Health Precinct, is "a community dedicated to helping the world access, understand and benefit from breakthroughs and solutions in health and tropical science". Located on the Bebegu Yumba campus at JCU Townsville, it was developed in partnership between JCU, Townsville Hospital and Health Service and Townsville City Council.

=== Singapore International Campus ===
James Cook University's Singapore campus (JCUS) was opened in 2003. In January 2015, James Cook University Singapore relocated to a new campus at 149 Sims Drive, ceasing operations at its previous campus on Upper Thomson Road, where it had been operating since July 2008. In 2020 there were 3644 students studying with JCU Singapore. Courses offered include business, education, information technology, psychology, environmental science, and tourism and hospitality, to international and domestic students. All degrees awarded are accredited by JCU Australia. Unlike its parent institution in Australia, James Cook University Singapore is classified as a private institution under the Ministry of Education's Private Education Act and is accredited by both EduTrust and the Council for Private Education. JCUS was awarded two consecutive "Edutrust Star" ratings by EduTrust in 2015 and 2019, the first private school to attain this benchmark.

=== Other facilities: Brisbane, Mackay, Mount Isa, Thursday Island, Rockhampton ===
JCU Brisbane, operated by Russo Higher Education, delivers undergraduate and postgraduate courses in accounting, business, education, hospitality and tourism and information technology to international students.

JCU's Mackay Clinical School is located at Mackay Base Hospital. It offers Year 5 and Year 6 of Bachelor of Medicine, Bachelor of Surgery (MBBS). Mackay Clinical School also offers Year 1 – 4 in Pharmacy, allowing students to undertake their full course requirements locally. JCU Mackay, located at the Mater Hospital, offers the Bachelor of Nursing Science (Pre-Registration) and provides facilities for medical and dental placements.

JCU's Mount Isa, Murtupuni campus provides training, development and support of the rural and remote health workforce and the management of key health issues in rural and remote settings. The centre offers the Bachelor of Nursing Science with an emphasis on rural, remote and Indigenous health care.

JCU Rockhampton is located in a modern high rise building in the city. Postgraduate students can access the facilities as part of JCU's GP Training Program. The JCU GP Training Program "provides clinicians the opportunity to expand their scope of practice through working in private clinics and in hospitals where they will gain experience treating a range of conditions in low-resource settings".

There is also a study centre located in the Australian Institute of Tropical Health and Medicine (AITHM) building on Thursday Island, providing teaching and learning facilities for nursing, education and diploma of higher education students in the Torres Strait region, including the northern tip of Australia. The Thursday Island study centre opened in 2003.

== Governance and structure ==
=== Coat of arms ===
As a corporate body, James Cook University bears arms comprising four main elements – shield, crest (Captain James Cook's ship, HMS Endeavour, in full sail), supporters (a pair of brolgas with open wings), and motto.

The university motto is Cresente Luce, which means light ever increasing. This motto was first proposed by Professor Frederick Walter Robinson (Doc Robbie), professor of English at the University of Queensland, in 1962 for the then University College of Townsville. The university college was established as a college of the University of Queensland. Adopted in 1963, the motto remained unchanged after James Cook University of North Queensland was established and incorporated in April 1970, and later became James Cook University.

== Academic profile ==
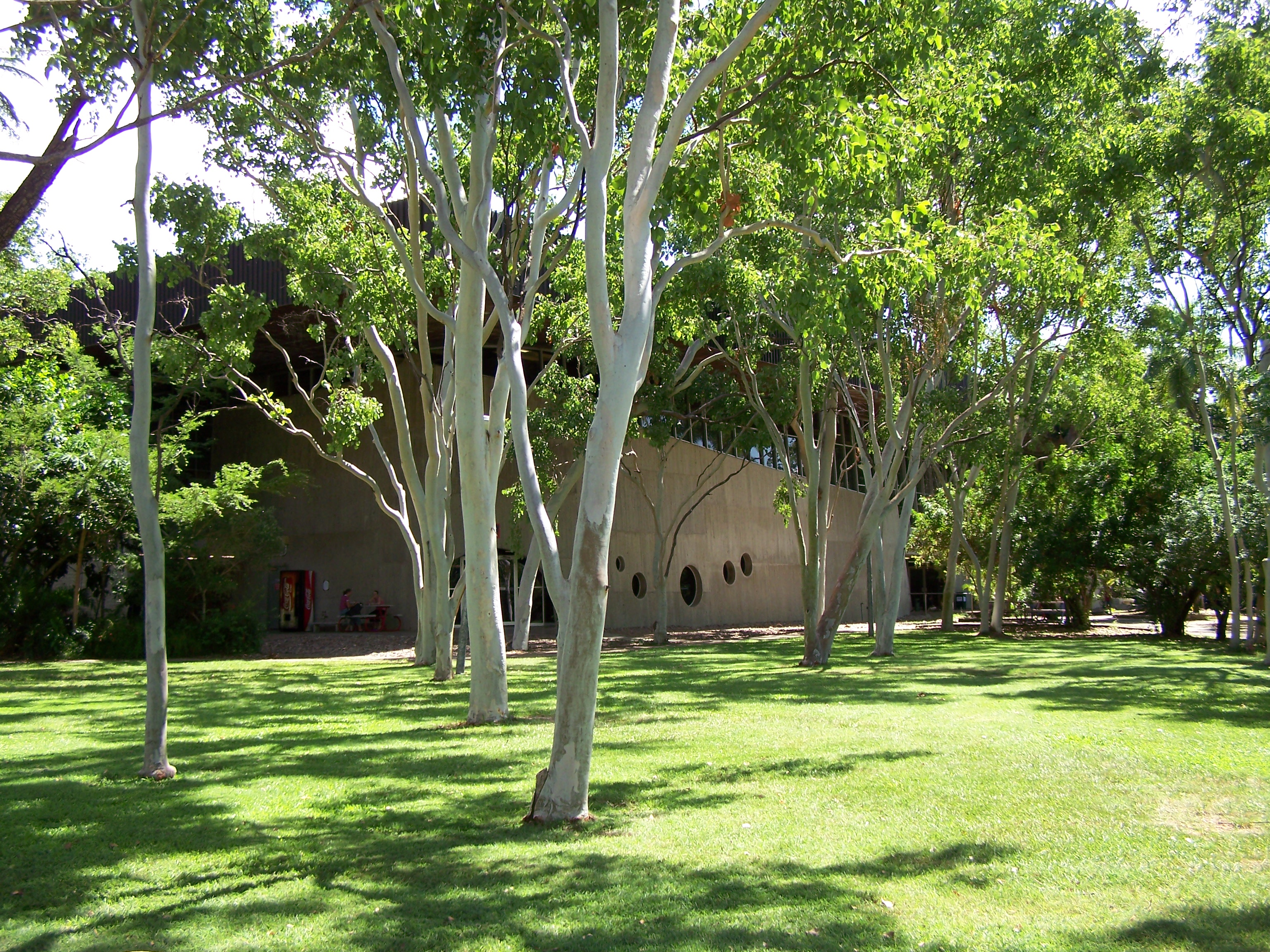
The library at Douglas Campus

In 2007 James Cook University became a member of Innovative Research Universities Australia (now called Innovative Research Universities). Innovative Research Universities (IRU) is a network of seven comprehensive universities committed to conducting research of national and international standing.

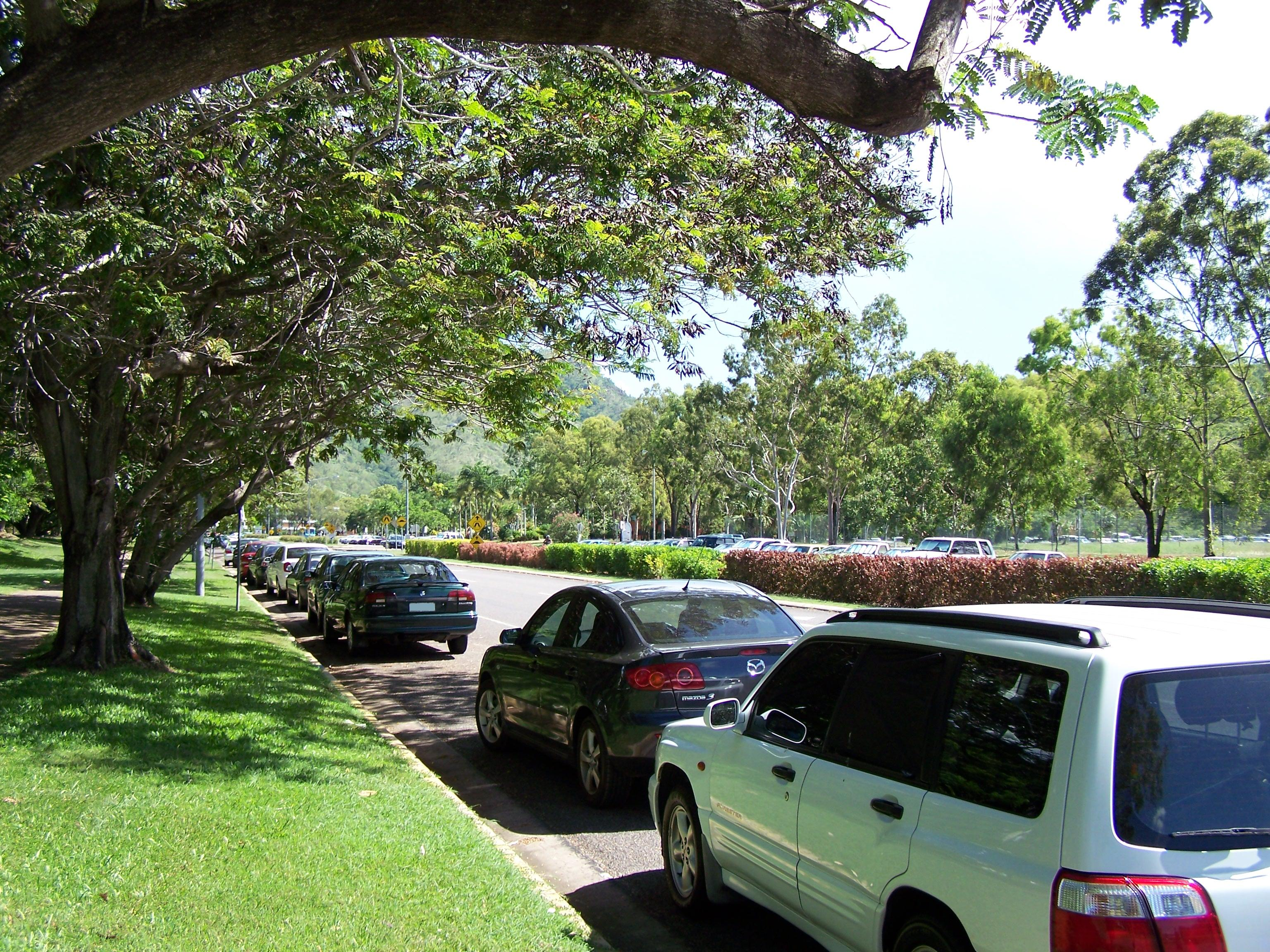
University Drive at Douglas Campus

=== Medicine ===
In 2001 the university took in its first medical students in its newly formed School of Medicine. An undergraduate veterinary degree was added to the university for the first time in 2006 and in 2009 the Bachelor of Dental Surgery commenced. Today the university offers undergraduate and postgraduate degrees in science, including marine biology and environmental science; arts, humanities and social work; business, law and governance; creative media; education; engineering and planning; healthcare, rehabilitation and psychology; medicine, dentistry and pharmacy; public health; and veterinary science. Many courses are available online.

=== Academic reputation ===
University rankings

Global – Overall
- ARWU World: 401–500 (2025)
- CWTS World: 601 (Note: The CWTS Leiden Ranking is based on P (top 10%).) (2024)
- QS World: =440 (2026)
- THE World: 351–400 (2026)
- USNWR Global: =416 (25/26)

National – Overall
- ARWU National: 21–24 (2025)
- CWTS National: 24 (2024)
- ERA National: 22 (2018)
- QS National: 25 (2026)
- THE National: 23–25 (2026)
- USNWR National: 23 (25/26)
- AFR National: =17 (2025)

In the 2024 Aggregate Ranking of Top Universities, which measures aggregate performance across the QS, THE and ARWU rankings, the university attained a position of #341 (24th nationally).

National publications

In the Australian Financial Review Best Universities Ranking 2025, the university was tied #17 amongst Australian universities.

Global publications

In the 2026 Quacquarelli Symonds World University Rankings (published 2025), the university attained a tied position of #440 (25th nationally).

In the Times Higher Education World University Rankings 2026 (published 2025), the university attained a position of #351–400 (tied 23–25th nationally).

In the 2025 Academic Ranking of World Universities, the university attained a position of #401–500 (tied 21–24th nationally).

In the 2025–2026 U.S. News & World Report Best Global Universities, the university attained a tied position of #416 (23rd nationally).

In the CWTS Leiden Ranking 2024, the university attained a position of #601 (24th nationally).

=== Student outcomes ===
The Australian Government's QILT (Note: Abbreviation for Quality Indicators for Learning and Teaching.) conducts national surveys documenting the student life cycle from enrolment through to employment. These surveys place more emphasis on criteria such as student experience, graduate outcomes and employer satisfaction than perceived reputation, research output and citation counts.

In the 2023 Employer Satisfaction Survey, graduates of the university had an overall employer satisfaction rate of 84.7%.

In the 2023 Graduate Outcomes Survey, graduates of the university had a full-time employment rate of 89.5% for undergraduates and 92.7% for postgraduates. The initial full-time salary was A$73,100 for undergraduates and A$108,100 for postgraduates.

In the 2023 Student Experience Survey, undergraduates at the university rated the quality of their entire educational experience at 74.9% meanwhile postgraduates rated their overall education experience at 76.7%.

=== Lecture Series ===
The Eddie Koiki Mabo Lecture Series was established in 2004, in honour of Indigenous land rights campaigner Eddie Mabo, who was employed by the university as a groundsman from 1967 to 1971, and later enrolled as a student at the Townsville College of Advanced Education, which later amalgamated with JCU. Mabo famously spent ten years on the Mabo case, in which a landmark ruling that established the concept of native title in Australia was made in 1992. The lecture takes place on Mabo Day, 3 June each year, with an address given by an invited speaker. Speakers have included:

- 2004: Frank Brennan
- 2005: Hugh Mackay
- 2006: Larissa Behrendt
- 2008: Jenny Macklin
- 2009: Ross Garnaut
- 2010: Chris Sarra
- 2011: Mick Gooda
- 2012: Henry Reynolds
- 2013: Bryan Keon-Cohen QC
- 2014: Shannan Dodson, Digital Campaign Manager of Recognise Australia
- 2016: N. M. Nakata, Pro-Vice Chancellor for Indigenous Education and Strategy, JCU
- 2017: Megan Davis
- 2022: Stan Grant, who spoke about the Mabo case on the 30th anniversary of the decision

== Student life ==
=== Student demographics ===
In 2021, JCU's student population was at 17,001, which includes 4,289 International students.

=== Residential colleges ===
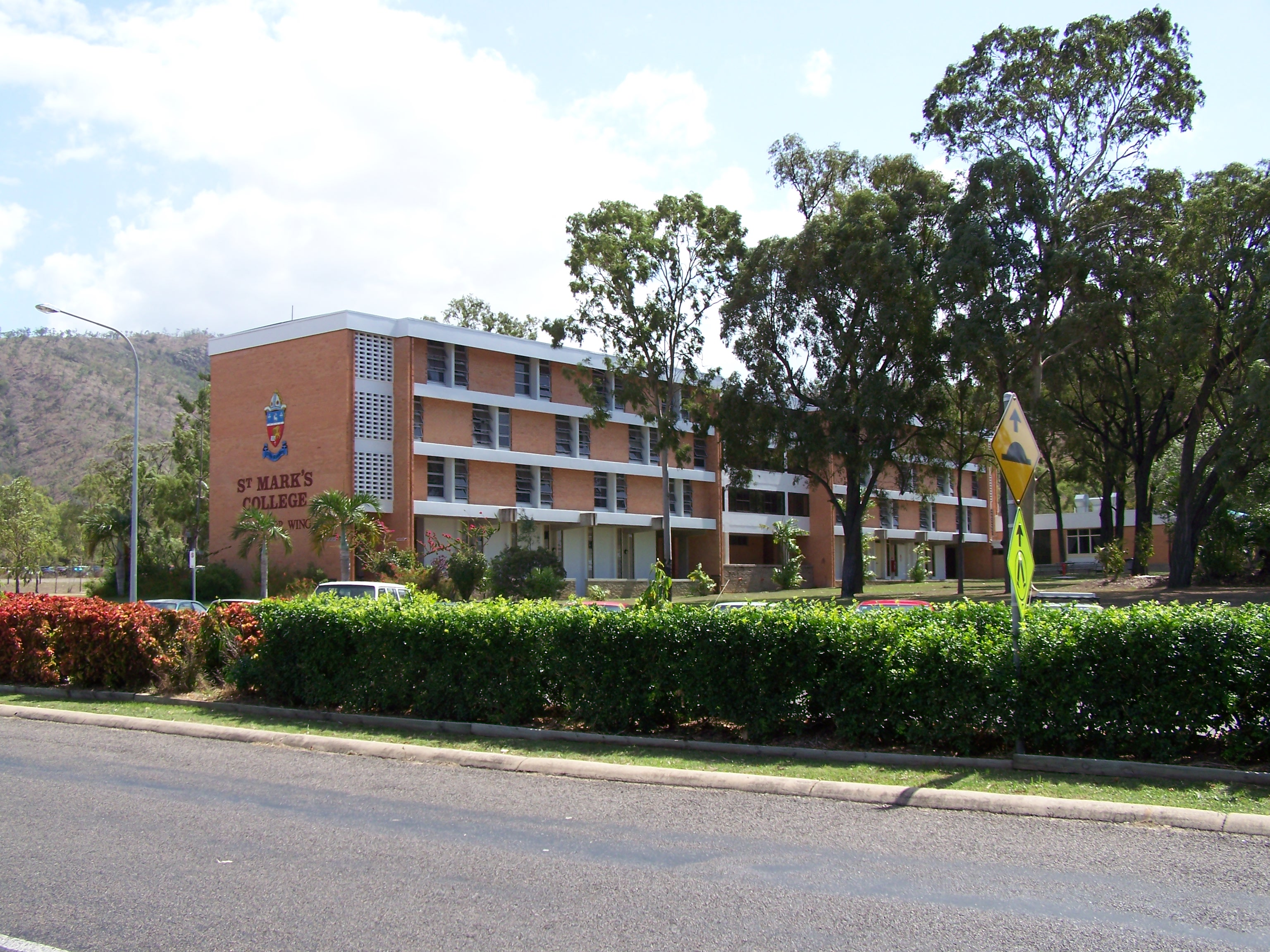
St Marks' College

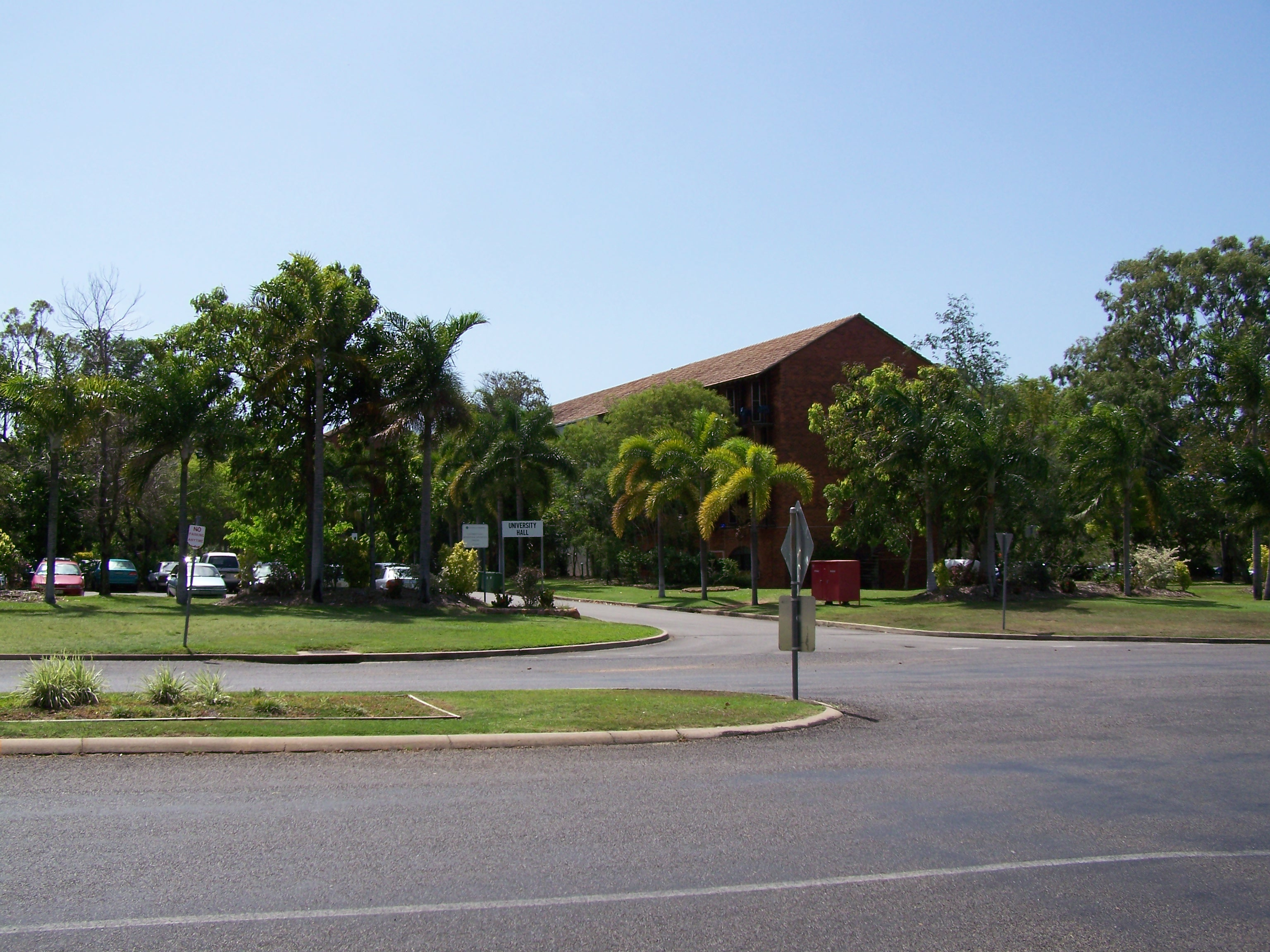
University Hall

James Cook University's Townsville, Bebegu Yuma campus, situated in the suburb of Douglas, has five on-campus residential halls and colleges, which can accommodate 1,158 students. Services offered by these facilities vary from self-catered to fully catered. James Cook University's Cairns, Nguma-bada campus, situated in the outer northern suburb of Smithfield, has one on-campus self-catered residential hall, John Grey Hall, which can accommodate 287 students.

=== Townsville ===
==== Affiliated colleges ====
Saints Catholic College, first founded in 1964 and run by the Roman Catholic Diocese of Townsville, was formed in 2011 with the amalgamation of the Catholic Colleges of St Raphael and St Paul and the addition of a third wing, St Mary MacKillop Wing, in honour of Australia's first Saint. Saints Catholic College provides fully catered accommodation to 296 students. Saint Mark's College, run by the Anglican Diocese of North Queensland, accommodated 154 male and female students until its closure in 2017 due to financial difficulties. The John Flynn College was established in 1968 and is named after Australian Presbyterian minister John Flynn. The college provides fully catered accommodation for more than 253 students.

==== Halls of Residence ====
James Cook University manages three non-denominational halls in Townsville for 771 students. University Hall was the first residence to be established at the university in the 1960s and offered 241 fully catered rooms. University Hall opened for student accommodation in 1967 as a co-educational hall of residence and lays claim to being the first co-educational university hall of residence in Australia. University Hall officially closed at the end of the 2021 academic year. George Roberts Hall opened in 2002 with unit-style, fully-catered accommodation for 250 students. Rotary International House, containing 118 self-catered beds, was established in 1990 with the assistance of Rotary Clubs. Burralga Yumba opened at the beginning of the 2022 academic year. The new building contains 403 self-catered beds. Western Halls and Western Courts, former Halls of Residence colleges, closed in 2008 and 2018 respectively.

=== Cairns ===
==== John Grey Hall ====
John Grey Hall, named after Lt. Gen. John Grey, opened in 2018 to meet the need for on-campus accommodation in Cairns. The residential hall, which is managed by UniLodge, accommodates 287 students in self-catered accommodation with plans to expand to accommodate 1000 students.

== Controversies ==
=== Peter Ridd sacking ===
In November 2017, marine physicist Peter Ridd commenced proceedings in the Federal Circuit Court against the university alleging that by censuring and eventually dismissing him from his employment, JCU had breached the intellectual freedom provision in its enterprise agreement, in violation of the Fair Work Act. Ridd was a long-term professor who had been the head of the physics department from 2009 to 2016, and head of the Marine Geophysical Laboratory at JCU for 15 years. He had been critical of the accuracy of studies by the JCU marine studies centre. JCU maintained that "it had never sought to silence Ridd, and his sacking was due to 'serious misconduct' and breaches of the university's code".

Following a hearing, the Federal Circuit Court found that the university's actions were unlawful, and in September 2019 ordered JCU to pay $1.2 million in compensation to Ridd. The Court found that JCU had failed to respect the rights to intellectual freedom under its enterprise agreement.

In July 2020, a Full Court of the Federal Court of Australia overturned the Federal Circuit Court's decision, finding that JCU's actions did not breach the Fair Work Act and that the enterprise agreement did not give Ridd an "untrammelled right" to express professional opinions beyond the standards imposed by the university's code of conduct. In February 2021, the High Court of Australia granted special leave to Ridd to appeal the decision. The High Court heard the matter in June 2021.

On October 13, 2021, the High Court unanimously dismissed the appeal brought by Ridd. Although the Court found that some of the university's censures of Ridd were in breach of its enterprise agreement, Ridd ran his case on an "all or nothing" basis, and the High Court found that the termination of his employment was ultimately justified in relying on 18 findings of serious misconduct which were not protected by the university's academic freedom clause.

=== Sexual harassment and assault ===
Nine cases of sexual abuse or harassment were reported officially on campus between 2011 and 2016, resulting in one person being removed from a college. These included an allegation of a 2015 incident in which three unidentified males tried to gang-rape a female student.

In 2015 the university promoted a research officer to academic adviser despite his having pleaded guilty to raping a student. The then acting vice-chancellor said there was a failure of internal processes and that the staff member would have been dismissed immediately if senior management had been aware that he had pleaded guilty. However, whistleblowers said there had been a cover-up and that senior management, including the vice-chancellor and the university secretary, had been told of the guilty plea prior to the perpetrator's promotion.

The university began a review in 2017 which led to revised policies, mandatory online training for students and staff, first responder training for staff, and counselling for victims.

=== Scientific fraud claims ===
In May 2021, the American publication Science Magazine made claims about scientific fraud involving 22 papers linked to James Cook University's Centre of Excellence for Coral Reef Studies. The Australian Research Council, the US National Science Foundation, and JCU had been asked to investigate the allegations. The article supported by the international Science Fund for Investigative Reporting, is the culmination of years of research and contested claims over how fish behaviour is changed by rising levels of carbon dioxide in the oceans. Researchers claimed to have evidence of manipulation in publicly available raw data files for two papers, one published in Science Magazine, the other in Nature Climate Change, combined with large and "statistically impossible" effects from CO_{2} reported in many of the other papers.

=== Scientific misconduct ===
An investigation by the UK scientific journal Nature published on 8 January 2020, found that eight James Cook University (JCU) studies on the effect of climate change on coral reef fish, one of which was authored by a JCU educated discredited scientist, had a 100 percent replication failure and thus none of the findings of the original eight studies were found to be correct. The Swedish scientists Josefin Sundin and Fredrik Jutfelt were the first to report their suspicions to Uppsala University. Their informal investigation, and the proofs they collected, lead to the formal investigation. Concerns raised about a study the scientist published while at JCU between 2010 and 2014 included an improbable number of lionfish claimed to have been used in this study, and images of 50 fish provided which appeared to include multiple images of some biological specimens, and two images that had been flipped making two fish appear to be four. The scientist had also been found guilty of fabricating data underpinning a study at Uppsala University in Sweden following her departure from JCU in Queensland, Australia. The study was subsequently retracted.

=== University response to medical student misconduct ===
In 2025, James Cook University faced significant scrutiny and widespread public backlash following a controversial incident involving one of its medical students. The controversy erupted when it was disclosed that a student, who had been convicted of physically assaulting a former partner in a violent act motivated by jealousy, had received a character reference from a member of the university's staff. This revelation sparked intense criticism from various quarters, including the local community, medical professionals, and student organisations, who expressed profound concern over the university's handling of the situation and its implications for the integrity of its medical program.

== Notable people ==
This is a list of alumni and former faculty and staff of James Cook University, including preceding institutions such as Townsville University College and Townsville College of Advanced Education.

=== Notable alumni ===
- Paul Amato, professor at Pennsylvania State University and researcher, among the 1% most cited scientists of 2004 according to Thomson Reuters' Highly Cited Researchers
- Rachel Carling-Jenkins, politician
- Katarina Carroll, Commissioner of the Queensland Police Service
- David Crisafulli, Premier of Queensland (2024–present)
- Peter Coaldrake, vice chancellor of the Queensland University of Technology and chair of the board of Universities Australia
- Harris Eyre, neuroscientist, entrepreneur and author
- Brentley Frazer, author
- Philip Freier, Anglican clergyman and current Archbishop of Melbourne
- Julie-Ann Guivarra, diplomat
- Phillip Gwynne, author
- Julie Hall, World Health Organization Representative in the Philippines, and principal coordinator of international medical relief efforts for Typhoon Haiyan
- Silma Ihram, activist
- Merilyn Manley-Harris, professor of chemistry at University of Waikato
- Helen McGregor, geologist and climate change researcher, a Fellow with the Research School of Earth Sciences, Australian National University
- Jan McLucas, politician (Townsville CAE)
- Sue Meek, chief executive of the Australian Academy of Science
- Tony Mooney, former mayor of Townsville
- Susan Murabana, Kenyan astronomer
- Shaun Nelson, Queensland politician
- Christina Ochoa, Spanish actress and marine biologist
- Curtis Pitt, Queensland Treasurer, Minister for Industrial Relations and Minister for Aboriginal and Torres Strait Islander Partnerships
- Henry Reynolds, historian
- Margaret Reynolds, politician
- Glen Richards, entrepreneur and founder and CEO of Greencross
- Mark Robinson, Queensland politician
- Lindsay Simpson, journalist
- Natasha Smith, diplomat
- Andrew Stoner, former Deputy Premier of New South Wales, National Party Member for Oxley, New South Wales, in the New South Wales Legislative Assembly
- Jan Strugnell, Professor in the Centre for Sustainable Tropical Fisheries and Aquaculture at James Cook University and the first JCU alumnus to receive a Rhodes Scholarship to study at Oxford University
- Nicole Webster, principal research scientist at the Australian Institute of Marine Science
- Breiana Whitehead (born 2000), Olympic kitefoiler
- Ian Young, former vice chancellor, Swinburne University of Technology and Australian National University
- Thon Thamrongnawasawat, oceanographer, marine biologist, environmentalist

=== Notable staff ===
- Alexandra Aikhenvald (1957–), linguist, member of the Australian Academy of the Humanities
- Robert M. W. Dixon (1939–), professor of linguistics at the Cairns Institute and member of the Australian Academy of the Humanities
- John Endler, (1947-), ethologist and evolutionary biologist
- Terry Hughes (1956–), professor of marine biology, member of the Australian Academy of Science
- Betsy Jackes (1935–), adjunct professor, botanist, former dean
- Rhondda Jones (1945–), former professor of zoology, deputy vice-chancellor, and member of the Academy of Technological Sciences and Engineering (ATSE)
- George Kneipp (1922–1993), chancellor (1974–1993)
- William F. Laurance (1957–), biologist, recipient of the Australian Laureate Fellowship, and member of the American Association of the Advancement of Science (AAAS)
- Leonard Francis Lindoy, chemist, professor emeritus and member of the Australian Academy of Science
- Eddie Mabo (1936–1992), First Nations community leader and human rights activist, was employed at JCU as a gardener/groundsman between 1967 and 1971
- Christopher Margules, adjunct professor, College of Science and Engineering

=== Honorary degrees ===
Recipients of honorary degrees include:

- Tommy George (1928–2016), awarded an honorary Doctorate of Letters for his work in ecology
- David Hudson (1962–), Aboriginal musician
- Silma Ihram (1954–), pioneer of Muslim education in Australia
- Betsy Jackes (1935–), sixth JCU Doctor of Science honoris causa (2022) for enduring contributions to scholarship, community engagement, culture, achievements to the university and relating to tropical flora in northern Queensland
- Eddie Mabo (1936–1992), awarded an honorary Doctorate of the university for his efforts in improving the rights of Aboriginal and Torres Strait Islander people
- George Musgrave (1921–2006), awarded an honorary Doctorate of Letters for his work in traditional law
- Percy Trezise (1923–2005), awarded an honorary Doctorate of Letters in recognition of outstanding service to the community of Far North Queensland

== See also ==
- List of universities in Australia
