= Magnus Langseth =

Norwegian researcher (born 1952)

- Born: 18 June 1952 (age 73); Norway
- Occupation: Professor at the Department of Structural Engineering at the Norwegian University of Science and Technology

Magnus Langseth (born 18 June 1952) is a Norwegian researcher. He is a professor at the Department of Structural Engineering at the Norwegian University of Science and Technology (NTNU) in Trondheim, Norway. «His research is primarily related to impact and crashworthiness of aluminium and high-strength steel structures as well as lightweight ballistic protection. Included here is the development of test facilities for material testing at elevated rates of strain as well as facilities for impact and crashworthiness testing of components and structures.»

He is also the Director of SFI CASA at NTNU for the period 2015–2023. SFI is short for Senter for forskningsdrevet innovasjon = Centre for Research-based Innovation, and CASA is part of the SFI scheme administered by the Research Council of Norway. Langseth was the Director of another SFI, SIMLab, from 2007 through 2014.

He graduated from the Norwegian Institute of Technology (NTH) as a civil engineer in 1976, and worked for some years as a consulting engineer. In 1983 he went back to NTH (now integrated in NTNU) where he took his doctorate in 1988 with the thesis Dropped objects : plugging capacity of steel plates. He was appointed professor in 1995.

He is the Editor-in-Chief of the International Journal of Impact Engineering, and sits on the editorial boards of the journals Multidiscipline Modeling in Materials and Structures and Ships and Offshore Structures.

== Honours ==
Langseth is a member of the Royal Norwegian Society of Sciences and Letters and the Norwegian Academy of Technological Sciences.

He was awarded the "Médaille Albert Portevin" by Société française de métallurgie et de matériaux, SF2M in 2005. The medal is awarded by SF2M every two years, to a French or foreign person who has made an outstanding contribution in the areas in which Portevin distinguished himself, especially in processing and formatting properties of materials.

In 2009 he was appointed Honorary Doctor at the Université de Valenciennes et du Hainaut-Cambrésis.

== Publications ==
- List of publications by Magnus Langseth in BIBSYS (Norway)

List of publications by Magnus Langseth in CRIStin (The Norwegian Scientific Index)

== Sources ==
- Elsevier's information on Langseth
- NTNU's information on Langseth
