= Fredrik Jutfelt =

Swedish scientist (born 1975)

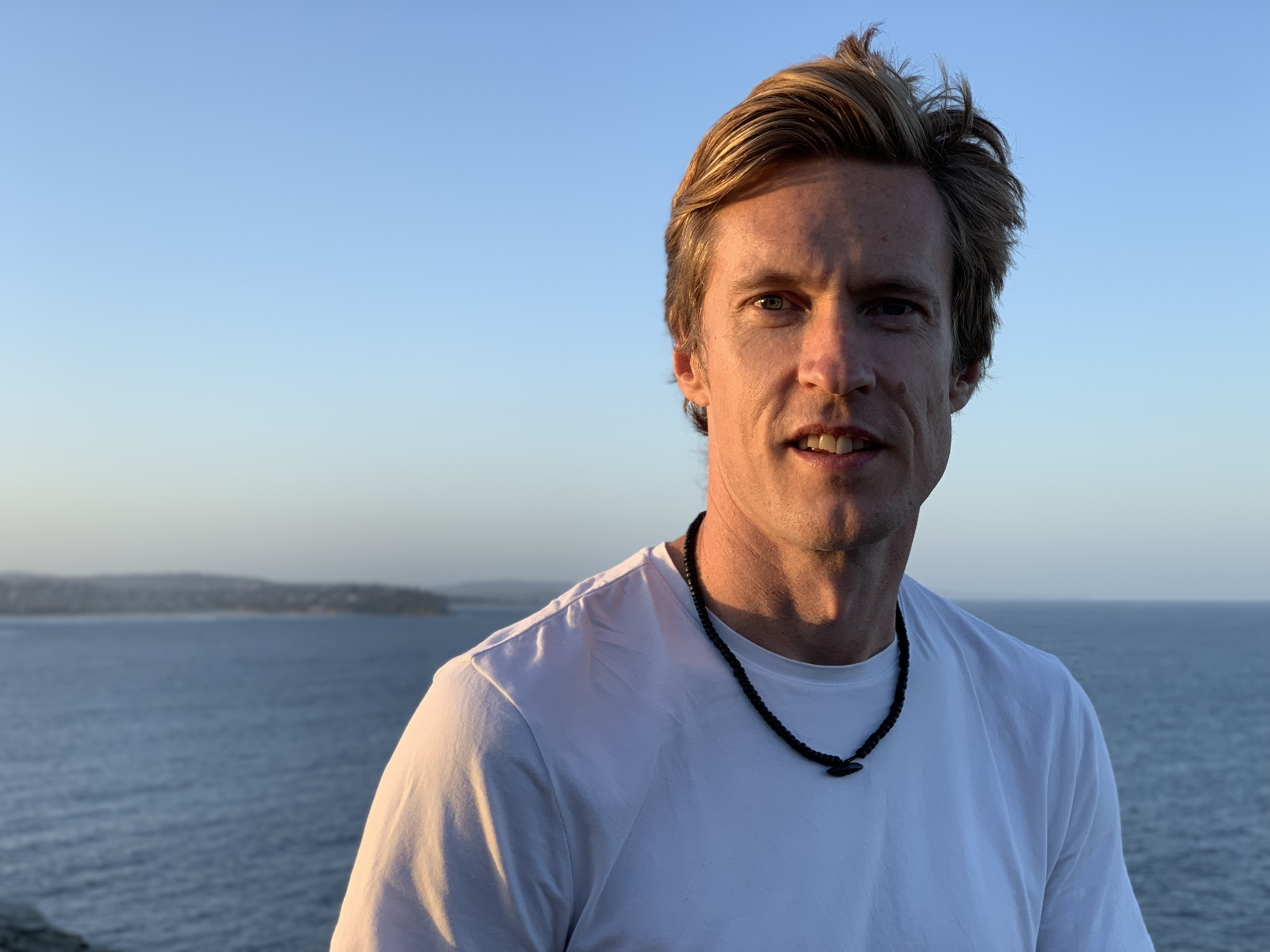
- Jutfelt in 2019
- Born: 18 September 1975 (age 50)
- Education: University of Gothenburg
- Scientific career
- Fields: Ecophysiology
- Workplaces: Current: University of Gothenburg Former: Norwegian University of Science and Technology (NTNU)
- Thesis: The intestinal epithelium of salmonids: transepithelial transport, barrier function and bacterial interactions (2006)

Fredrik Jutfelt (born 1975) is a Swedish scientist and animal physiologist. He is a professor at the Department of Biological & Environmental Sciences at the University of Gothenburg in Sweden and former professor at the Department of Biology at the Norwegian University of Science and Technology (NTNU) in Trondheim, Norway. His research group, the Jutfelt Fish Ecophysiology Lab, investigates how fish respond physiologically and behaviourally to changes in the environment, with a particular focus on the effects of ocean warming and ocean acidification on the physiology and behaviour of fish. Much of the research is based on laboratory studies of zebrafish, and the group also studies the impacts of climate change on various other marine animals.

In 2006, Jutfelt graduated with a PhD from the University of Gothenburg, Sweden, with the thesis titled "The intestinal epithelium of salmonids: transepithelial transport, barrier function and bacterial interactions." After finishing his PhD, he was a postdoc at the University of Gothenburg in collaboration with the Norwegian Institute of Marine Research in Bergen, Norway. During his PhD and postdoc, his research topic was animal physiology, and specifically on epithelial physiology in fish. In 2010–2014 he was employed as an assistant professor at the University of Gothenburg, and in 2015 he was employed as an associate professor at the Department of Biology, NTNU, where he was promoted to full professor in 2021.

Jutfelt was a member of the NTNU Outstanding Academic Fellows Programme during 2017–2021. The participants of this group are scientists who are internationally recognized in their field. In 2022, he was elected as a member of The Royal Norwegian Society of Sciences and Letters.

More recently, his research topic focuses on climate change physiology, investigating how both ocean acidification and temperature affect fish. The research on ocean acidification was highly publicised following papers published in the scientific journals Nature and PLOS Biology. The articles «Ocean acidification does not impair the behaviour of coral reef fishes» (2020) and «Meta-analysis reveals an extreme "decline effect" in the impacts of ocean acidification on fish behavior» (2022) are both highly cited. Earlier studies had suggested that coral reef fishes were threatened by ocean acidification, causing severe behavioural abnormalities. In contrast, the results of the two studies from Jutfelt's group revealed that ocean acidification doesn't dramatically affect the behaviour of coral reef fish as previously though. However, both coral reefs and the associated diversity of marine organisms that inhabit them are threatened by rising CO_{2} levels. This research also led to the discovery of data fabrication and scientific misconduct in this field. Jutfelt and colleagues have been active in detecting and countering data fabrication and scientific misconduct in other related topics as well, which has led to the retractions of numerous articles, including those published in the prestigious journal Science.

Currently, the Jutfelt Fish Ecophysiology Lab investigates how evolution can lead to physiological adaptation to the temperature environment where the fish live. Their research regarding the ability of fish to evolve in response to freshwater warming has been integral in understanding animal responses to climate change. This research received an ERC Consolidator Grant from the European Research Council for the years 2021–2026 (2 million Euro). In 2020, the group published the results of a large artificial selection experiment in Proceedings of the National Academy of Sciences of the United States of America (PNAS), showing that evolution of tolerance to warming can occur in fish. The rate of evolution, however, was suggested to be too slow for evolutionary rescue to protect fish from the impacts of climate change. More recently, the group's publication in Nature Climate Change showed that evolution of warming tolerance does not lead to trade-offs with numerous life history traits but, surprisingly, improves cold tolerance in zebrafish.

== Publications ==
- Fredrik Jutfelt publications indexed by Google Scholar
- List of publications by Fredrik Jutfelt in BIBSYS (Norway)
- List of publications by Fredrik Jutfelt in CRIStin (The Norwegian Scientific Index)
