= Unit (Norway) =

Agency of the Norwegian Ministry of Education and Research

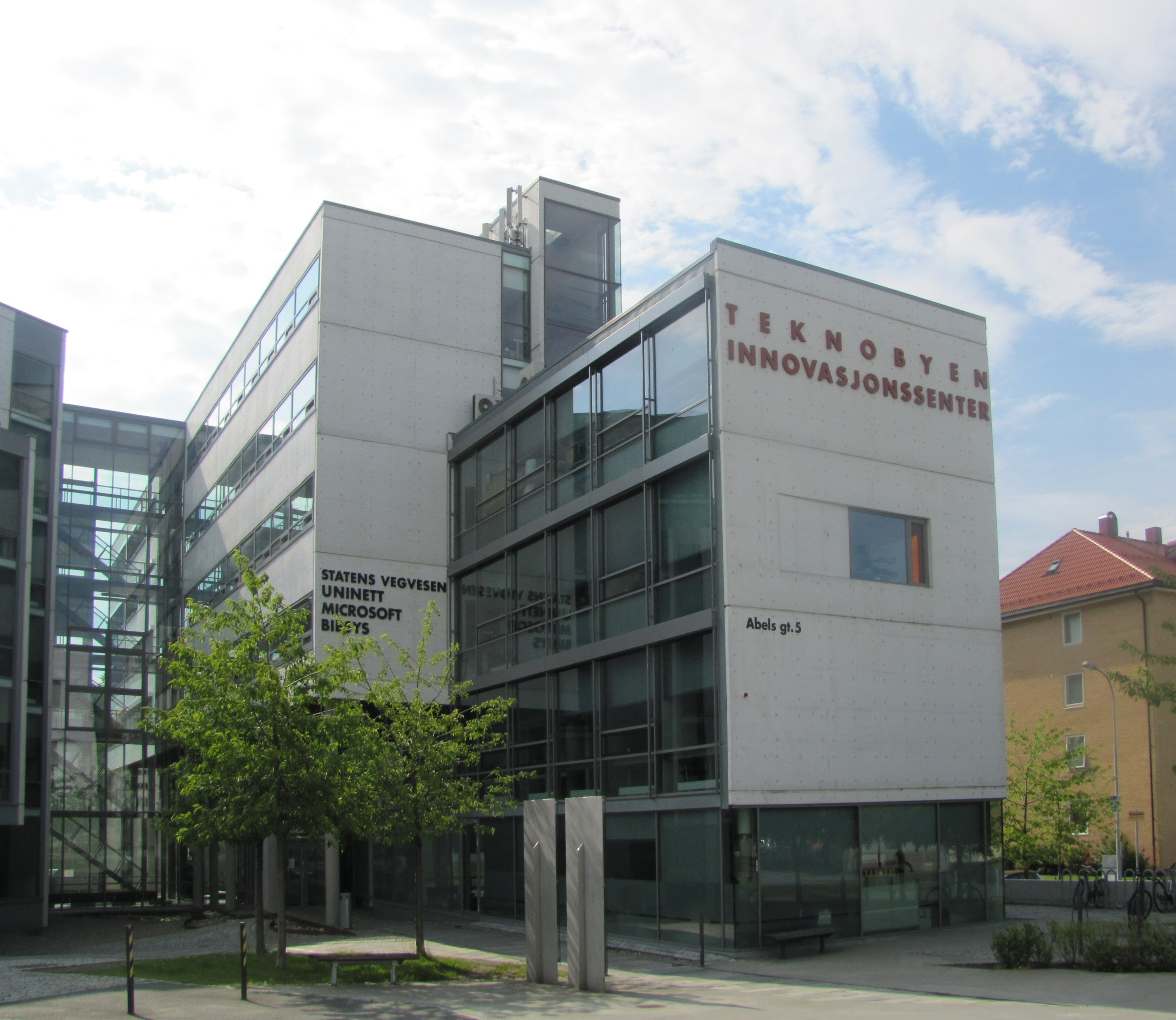

Directorate overview
- Formed: January 1, 2018; 8 years ago
- Preceding agencies: BIBSYS; CERES; parts of Uninett
- Type: government directorate
- Headquarters: Teknobyen Innovasjonssenter; Abels gate 5A; 7030 Trondheim, Norway; 63.41562589°N 10.39292431°E
- Employees: 204
- Directorate executive: Roar Olsen, director
- Parent department: Ministry of Education and Research
- Key document: https://www.unit.no/en/about-unit-0
- Website: www.unit.no/en
- Agency ID: 919 477 822

Unit, which labels itself as the Norwegian "directorate for ICT and joint services in higher education and research", is the government directorate within the Ministry of Education and Research which provides governance of and access to shared information and communications technology (ICT) services. Unit was created on January 1, 2018, following a merger of BIBSYS, CERES and parts of Uninett.

== See also ==
- National Library of Norway
- Open access in Norway
- Project DEAL
