= Norwegian Centre for Research Data =

The Norwegian Centre for Research Data (Norwegian: Norsk senter for forskningsdata) (NSD) was a Norwegian institution established to manage data for the research community of Norway. Until 1 March 2016 it was known as Norwegian Social Science Data Services. In 2022, the organization was merged together with Uninett and Unit (Norway) into Sikt, the Norwegian Agency for Shared Services in Education and Research.

The centre was established in 1971 as part of the Research Council of Norway. In 2003, the NSD was restructured as a limited company, with ownership retained by the Norwegian Ministry of Education and Research. As of 2015, it was one of the world's largest archives for research data, employing a staff of 90 people in Bergen

NSD operated the Norwegian Scientific Index and the European database ERIH PLUS, the first of which continues to be provided by Sikt since the merger. ERIH PLUS is currently hosted by the Norwegian Directorate for Higher Education and Skills.
