= Scoundrel Days: A Memoir =

Memoir by Brentley Frazer

Scoundrel Days: a memoir
- Author: Brentley Frazer
- Cover artist: Josh Durham
- Language: English
- Genre: Memoir, Bildungsroman, Künstlerroman, Roman-à-clef, Creative Nonfiction
- Published: March 01, 2017
- Publisher: University of Queensland Press (UQP)
- Publication place: Australia
- Pages: 312
- ISBN: 9780702259562
- OCLC: 957466618

Scoundrel Days is a memoir by Australian contemporary poet Brentley Frazer. Described as "a gritty, Gen X memoir, recounting wild escapades into an under-culture of drugs and violence and sex by ABC Radio National and by the publisher as "Tom Sawyer on acid, a 21st-century On the Road, a Holden Caulfield for punks", literary critic Rohan Wilson compared Frazer's ability to shock, surprise and unsettle with that of Marcel Duchamp, concluding: "Frazer is writing here in the tradition of Helen Garner, Andrew McGahan and Nick Earls.This is dirty realism at its dirtiest."

== Writing and publication ==
Scoundrel Days was first published in Australia in March 2017 by University of Queensland Press in trade paperback format. Frazer wrote Scoundrel Days as the creative component of a Doctoral thesis in experimental creative non-fiction while a post-graduate student at Griffith University in Brisbane, Australia. In an academic paper published by TEXT Journal describing the writing process of Scoundrel Days, Frazer refers to the work as a 'novelised memoir, written in first person present perfect . . . there is no Wonder Years voiceover telling you what to think.'

During an interview on Radio National ABC Nightlife Frazer recounted that he first began to write Scoundrel Days in 1993 while living between share-houses in Fortitude Valley: 'The very first draft was disorder manifest, simply typed up transcriptions from journals written while itinerant, hitch-hiking or on long-distance trains and buses between Townsville and Brisbane from the mid 80s. I abandoned several drafts, lost several in floods and evictions, working on it sometimes for a year and sometimes not wanting to look at it at all for months, all the while I kept doing stupid things to get more material to write about. The final draft came together when I decided to get very serious about learning how to write a novel and successfully pitched the work in progress to undertake a PhD in creative writing . . . I wrote the final sentence and felt comfortable thinking of it as finished and ready to submit to publishers in 2015, so, yeah, it took more than twenty years to write.'

== Synopsis ==
The underlying narrative arc is of rejection and redemption, of anarchy and order, hate and love. The story follows a recalcitrant boy who finds the sacred bond of familial trust broken by parents who, since their own birth, are members of a secretive fundamentalist evangelical Christian cult. Exacerbating this Amish like environment is his father's job as a police officer and his dad has an ever-watchful eye on those who transcend both God and Man's rules and regulations. The first part of the book deals with the hyperbolic bravado the author adopts to counter his social standing as weirdo and cop's son in an outback mining town in far north Queensland. He starts a gang and adopts an outlook that one critic has described as 'anti coming of age' [...] in this type of story the protagonist is far less mutable than they have any right to be. Instead, he is stubbornly sure of himself and resistant to change. Rather than stumble with trepidation through his teenage years he bypasses puberty and charges into adult situations with an unwarranted confidence.

After the family relocate to Townsville in 1984 he encounters extreme bullying at high school and soon befriends a dangerous and violent punk named Reuben, also new to town, who grew up on the streets of Sydney. After Reuben almost murders a bully in the schoolyard during one of numerous fights and our protagonist narrowly escapes a predatory pederast preacher visiting the family home, the two boys flee and go on a series of breath-taking adventures, soaked in smut and crime, walking on the very edge of life and death, up and down the east coast of Australia. The exploits and the break-neck pace of the narrative do not let up until the late 1990s when redemption comes and the protagonist finds love with a young woman who checkmates his immorality and self-destructive tendencies.

== Style, technique and genre ==
Written in a transgressive minimalist style and leaning heavily on techniques developed by Tom Spanbauer's theories of Dangerous Writing, Scoundrel Days has been described as reading with: a visceral and urgent internal perspective which is both direct and poetic, often charming, and sometimes bleakly funny, gritty with a lyrical cadence, a nervy present-perfect tense reminiscent of the hyperbolic, ugly-beautiful prose of Kathy Acker, a terse telegraphic prose that brings the reader very close to the details laid down thick and terrible, and as an immersive, vital prose that almost drags the reader along.

Scoundrel Days is marketed as a memoir, but does not use the reflective voice common to the genre, and therefore reads like a novel. It is Bildungsroman in that it examines the author's formative years and also explicitly his spiritual education. It is Künstlerroman in the tradition of Portrait of the Artist as a Young Man, Look Homeward, Angel and Ham on Rye, as from the outset the reader witnesses the emergence of the poet from the psychosocial chrysalis of childhood, and it is an autobiographical Roman à clef novel like those of Henry Miller and Jack Kerouac. All the fictitious names of the characters portray real people, all the events represent real events in the author's life but the ever-present drugs and alcohol lend an hallucinatory quality, which challenges the readers ability to trust the author's recall. It is this effective use of the unreliable narrator that has led both the publisher and the critics to compare the protagonist of Scoundrel Days with Tom Sawyer, Sal Paradise and Holden Caulfield.

Frazer composed Scoundrel Days using an obscure literary constraint. According to Frazer's Doctoral thesis, is the first long-form creative work in history composed entirely in English Prime, a language discipline in which there are no tenses of the verb “to be”. By using this technique and abandoning the copula (are, am, is, was, were, be, etc.,), it's misuse which results in Deity mode of speech (Bourland Jr & Kellogg III, 1990), the literary voice of the narrator becomes what Frazer refers to as, Human Mode of Speech, the problem of show vs tell fades to insignificance as the narrative moves from the showing to the doing. The result is a narrative that one critic wrote 'should become the gold-standard how-to manual on writing clear, utterly active prose.'

The author himself, talking about the writing of Scoundrel Days during an interview on Radio National, Canberra (Books and Arts) hosted by Michael Cathcart and Cassie McCullagh, says he is influenced by Henry Miller, but does not like the misogyny, sexual violence and overuse of gendered nouns present in Miller's work. Frazer says he made sure that those things never happened in his writing, and says he did not want to give the readers a shocking, judgemental explicitness. Frazer denies there is any misogyny in the writing of his experiences, and says he is a passive partner. McCullagh says she was around in the time when the book was based, and asks about the genuine sexual nature of the women around the 1980s and 1990s. Frazer says the females in the smaller country towns were bored and very adventurous, and says they were experimenting sexually earlier on, as were the boys. He talks about the human drive to have freedom, and his way of life during the time of the memoir. He says he put new techniques borrowed from the world of filmmaking in his book for the more astute readers, and says he only sees the central figure as a slightly magnified character. McCullagh asks Frazer about the time when the memoir was based, and asks him to describe the narrative arc of the time frame. Frazer discusses the contents of the book, the situations he put himself into to create an exciting narrative, and the influence of the character Tom Sawyer written by Mark Twain's had on his own life. He says he stopped pushing the boundaries when he fell in love, and said his lifestyle as a sort-of teenaged Valmont had given him enough lived experience to write the memoir.

== Themes ==
Focusing mainly on the lifestyle and proclivities of bohemian artists, writers and poets in Australia in the 80s and 90s the book largely functions as a meditation on the pursuit of total artistic and personal freedom and embodies the philosophy of Oscar Wilde's tenet Life imitates Art; the living and the writing are one and the same, indistinguishable to the protagonist. Transgressive tropes abound: promiscuity, group sex, drugs, institutionalised violence, anti-socialism, nihilism, immorality, perversion and crime are the main focus and the young poet, disillusioned with his parents and the foundational morality of their religious cult, rejects the corruption he perceives in society by getting out of control. He becomes a problem. Precocious, brash, and certain of his own perceptions, he reads poetry and despises any attempt to socialise him into a system he has no intention of joining. Scoundrel Days pays homage to lost boys who grow up to be troubled young men. Frazer's childhood in Greenvale, 220 kilometres northwest of Townsville, is populated by budding pugilists, often themselves the victims of casual violence or sexual abuse. More than once there looms a drunken father as awful as Pap in The Adventures of Tom Sawyer.

Growing up godless in a "deranged, apocalyptic" cult, Frazer develops a disdain for authority, cemented by his run-ins with the ne'er-do-wells in his policeman father's cells, and also the "tramp preachers" who pass through town and who have a tendency to wander into the bathroom as he showers.

Already inured to pain and violence through living next door to the lock-up where his father works as the local cop, Brentley arrives at school and his world expands, as does his capacity for observation and recall. Brentley, the outsider – the weird kid – takes all the punches in the gut from the outset and consequently becomes wary, vigilant and extremely self-conscious. He watches himself act, and soon learns how to put on other personas and slip into characters from the books he reads. Scoundrel Days examines the concepts of conscience and morality and how we form them. Do we acquire the inner voice? Or does it emerge from within, inherent, like the colour of one’s eyes? This memoir throws up questions about the nature of conscience, which propels much of young Brentley’s character development.

Under it all lies a dark, nihilist void where, like Gordon in Andrew McGahan’s Praise (1992), expectation is seen as the root of unhappiness. But unlike Gordon, who slouches towards destruction content in the acceptance of a flawed physicality, Frazer oscillates between bravado and moments of self-awareness. This enigmatic, self-styled outsider bravely lets us into the inner sanctum, which makes for a fascinating read.

== Characters ==
The true identity of the characters portrayed in Scoundrel Days have not been revealed by the author.

Other than the first person narrator 'Brentley', the major characters include, in order of appearance:

=== Uncle Parky ===
An elder indigenous Australian who is a Kuradji (similar to a shaman) and opens the young protagonist's eyes to the injustices of the European invader.

=== Hardy ===
A boy also born into the cult but is a secret member of a locally notorious graffiti posse The Heartbreak Kids and serves as the protagonist's link to:

=== Gigolo ===
A ward of the state half Australian Aboriginal street artist and leader of graffiti posse The Heartbreak Kids. Described as resembling the pop star Prince and an expert at breakdancing and break and entering.

=== Muddy ===
A half Australian Aboriginal bully and the schoolyard nemesis of the protagonist. Described as an anorexic leather jacket dragged through broken windscreens and thorny interpersonal relationships.

=== Harlan ===
The son of a British Army Captain and a violent brawler with an unfortunate facial scar who dresses like a Greaser.

=== Billy Jean ===
The protagonist's first childhood girlfriend who awakens him to idealised romantic love.

Reuben

The antihero of the book. A maladjusted, sociopathic and violent street kid who was the leader of a Sydney razor gang, described as both resembling spaghetti western heartthrob Terence Hill and as a deadly Nureyev.

=== Candy ===
A beautiful bisexual junky who is a student of fashion design and a nude artist's model. The protagonist meets her in a nightclub and the pair becomes inseparable for about seven years in the timeline of the narrative. Described as a miniature replica of Audrey Hepburn who dresses like Siouxsie Sioux and dances like a Fraggle on acid wearing roller skates.

=== Josef ===
An expat New Zealand musician who the protagonist meets at a model agency in Melbourne. Josef moves in with Brentley to start a punk band, much to the disdain of Candy. Josef spends several years on and off share housing with the couple between Melbourne, Brisbane and Townsville. Described as a thin hipped bass-playing kiwi bastard.

=== Yuri ===
A neo-beat poet from Brisbane who Brentley meets at a poetry reading in 1994. Yuri moves into an apartment shared by Brentley, Candy and Candy's sister Marie, an artist with the proclivity of painting in the nude and instigating group sex with the two poets whenever her sister is absent.

== Critical reception ==
In the first six months of its publication Scoundrel Days was reviewed by The Australian, The Australian Book Review, The Newtown Review of Books, all the metropolitan newspapers of Fairfax Media (The Age, The Sydney Morning Herald, The Canberra Times, The Brisbane Times, et al.), The Saturday Paper, Vogue Magazine, The Brag, Good Reading Magazine and nationally on ABC radio.

Frazer was immediately compared with Kerouac, Salinger and Twain (as asserted by the publisher) but also Henry Miller, Kathy Acker, Helen Garner, Andrew McGahan, Christos Tsiolkas, Nick Earls, Charlotte Wood, Elizabeth Harrower, Ruth Park, Justine Ettler and Christina Stead.

While the critics unanimously agreed that an important new literary voice had arrived on the Australian literary scene and gave universal acclaim for the quality and power of the writing (addictive and compelling, that rarest of literary treats: a good dose of the shocking, how brilliant is the writing? Like poetry written with a nail gun. Shit he's good. Uncommonly good, a roller-coaster ride of wild excess and anti-authoritarian adventures told in urgent and beautiful prose) and all commended its groundbreaking status in the discipline of E-Prime, the book's subject matter was widely condemned and its veracity challenged. One reviewer wrote: "So little of the story features ordinary doings that the reader must wonder how much comprises recollections from childhood and how much adventure arising in the writer’s imagination. Notwithstanding that, the level of detail speaks to authentic recall rather than confabulation. But this writer’s mind runs on no ordinary tracks.

The Saturday Paper argued that the writing of the beat generation has been a toxic influence on the literature of male writers in the late 20th and early 21st centuries and the days of readers wishing to revel in aggressively masculine, hedonistic worlds of hard drinking, drug-taking and sexual conquest are long gone. Literary critic Pam Greet wrote: Fuelled by drugs, alcohol, thousands of cigarettes, and punctuated by sex, violence, and wanton acts of both public and private (self-) destruction, Brentley Frazer’s memoir does not scream ‘poet in the making’.

The Australian singled out the sexual escapades of the author for criticism, writing this is what seems to get author in the most trouble, predatory religious figures, horny American backpackers, or desperately lonely long-distance lovers, our hero is never more than a few steps away from some new entanglement [...] They shed little light on who Brentley was at these points in his life, and [as] the women come and go and we learn barely more about them than what they look like. The question of misogyny starts to peek out of the text but any sense that it might be dealt with is forestalled until later on. Pam Greet also criticised Frazer's female characters, writing: Other writers describe Scoundrel Days as demonic, compelling, transcendent, sublime, radical. For me, scary. Frazer’s females I found especially difficult. Three basic groups include sisters and family relatives (thinly rendered: ‘I said to my mother once during an argument that I’ll never forgive her for getting me circumcised, that my recalcitrant attitude results from her karma.’), teachers and deputy principals (condemned by position) and girlfriends/sex objects (sex seemingly one of the only things that mattered: girlfriends, their sisters, their mothers, their friends, twosomes, threesomes, whatever).

The Newtown Review of Books questioned the precociousness of the protagonist, questioning: how does the young teen find the fortitude to reject his family’s religious beliefs? How does he decide to act and expose a predatory preacher at such a tender age, when no one else will? How can he be so attached to a violent punk like Reuben, whom he loves like a brother? How could he have sex with his girlfriend’s sisters, able to blithely ‘slaunt’ from one risky sexual encounter to the next, then somehow develop into an adult capable of deep empathy? Brisbane radio station 4ZZZ referred to Scoundrel Days as A Boy's Manifesto for Brutal Disrespect of Self and heavily criticised the author's laissez-faire and bohemian attitude to excessive smoking, drinking, drugs, violence and promiscuity; arguing that it is irresponsible of the publisher to market such a book to troubled young men and inappropriate for the author to encourage seeking value in vice. The Sydney Morning Herald makes a subtle reference to the books inherent promiscuity, dangerous living, drug taking and possible hyperbole, writing that "Frazer scatters memories like used tissues in share houses across Brisbane, Townsville, Airlie Beach, Melbourne and Perth. He subsists on pot noodles and weed, fuelled by Kerouac, Byron, Burroughs and Russian revolutionaries. Money, he reckons, is "coloured paper printed by some swindler [...] Sometimes the yarns stretch into tales taller than Mount Surprise, but then Scoundrel Days is more autobiographical fiction than memoir.". The Newtown Review of Books commented Scoundrel Days contains enough meat for half a dozen creative writing theses, but violence emerges as the major theme [...] teens who railed against stultifying suburban hells of the late 20th century and came of age in share houses, surviving on shit jobs and the dole, will recall the taste of amphetamine and cheap booze and the smell of mouldy sheets on a stained mattress. The Brag also made point of noting the tender age at which the protagonist learns the meanings of the words suicide, rape, jacking off, growling out, and a number of common swears [...] and while part of a rebellious schoolyard gang called The Wreckers, he discovers tobacco, alcohol, marijuana, amphetamines, pornography, madness, family violence and death.

Besides the subject matter, other criticisms included the perception that Frazer did not include enough about the fundamentalist Christian cult which featured heavily in promotional material for the book. The Saturday Paper wrote: "The shame is that Frazer’s childhood in The Truth is so teasingly dismissed, as he chooses instead to chronicle the most boring decade of a young literary hoon’s life, aping, for the umpteenth time, the tired old conventions of a movement whose toxic influence still lingers."

=== Individual reviewers ===
On Scoundrel Days the following notable Australian writers have commented:

"'How brilliant is the writing in Scoundrel Days? Like poetry written with a nail gun. Shit he's good. Uncommonly good. He's got a great eye, but also a lot of muscle to his writing, and that combo doesn't come along often enough. I hope he's got a lot more prose in him." ~ Nick Earls

"With a poet's eye for locating the marvellous within the commonplace and a novelist's ear for the nuances and rhythms of natural speech, Brentley Frazer has crafted a unique narrative from the myths and rumours of life and a wild imagination. Scoundrel Days is fiercely original, inspirational, and will no doubt find a wide, varied readership." ~ Anthony Lawrence

"An artist's true journey from blindness (or, what we call youth) into glimmerings of sight (coming of age). The writing is wonderful, and the writer lives in the tradition of the Beats, yet has managed to create something new through his use of the E-prime constraint." ~ Dr Venero Armanno, (Black Mountain and The Dirty Beat)

"A unique new voice in the Australian literary landscape." ~ Lindsay Simpson (Brothers in Arms and The Curer of Souls)

In an opinion piece in The Australian, the critic writes: "as far as anyone knows, this is the first time anyone has attempted a full-length memoir without the copula. Friends have asked me: “OK, that sounds cute, but is it any good?” Which is a question forbidden under the rules. But yes. It is." ~ Caroline Overington

Jenny Valentish for Fairfax Media writes: Frazer is a legendary protagonist, in the vein of Bukowski’s literary alter-ego [...] His writing is sometimes compared to that of Andrew McGahan, in particular, McGahan’s coming-of-age novel Praise, but Scoundrel Days spends little time examining the consistency of its author’s bodily fluids. Instead, he uses that nervy present-perfect tense to take us further, faster, harder. It has more in common with the hyperbolic, ugly-beautiful prose of Kathy Acker.”

“Poet and author Brentley Frazer recounts his rebellious youth with searing honesty in his memoir Scoundrel Days. Gritty with a lyrical cadence, the characters and violent, drug-fuelled, sexually-charged experiences he recounts are compelling for their raw detail and darkness. Frazer’s innate attraction to dissent, his untamed spirit and how it shaped his young life will sometimes shock, but makes reading his words an addiction in itself.” ~ Vogue Magazine, Australia

“Scoundrel Days is the compelling memoir from poet Brentley Frazer about his misspent adolescence in Queensland, a roller-coaster ride of wild excess and anti-authoritarian adventures told in urgent and beautiful prose.” —Sunday Life Magazine, READ, Sun Herald and Sunday Age

== Awards ==
- 2018 longlisted APA Book Design Awards — Best Designed Autobiography / Biography / Memoir
- 2018 shortlisted Mascara Avant-garde Awards — Non-Fiction

== Interviews ==
- Brentley Frazer's Scoundrel Days: Radio National, Australian Broadcasting Corp. Broadcast Monday 10 April 2017 10:27am
- Nightlife: featuring Brentley Frazer: Australian Broadcasting Corp. Broadcast Friday 24 Feb 2017, 10:00pm
- Social Work: Brentley Frazer: Trouble Magazine. Published March 29, 2017
- Five Minutes with Brentley Frazer, author of Scoundrel Days. The Brag Magazine. Published March 1, 2017
- Spotlight: Brisbane News magazine, March 22-28, 2017
