= Magne Børset =

Norwegian doctor and professor

- Born: 29 January 1958 (age 68); Rindal Municipality, Norway
- Scientific career
- Fields: Cancer Research
- Workplaces: Norwegian University of Science and Technology

Magne Børset (born 1958) is a Norwegian physician, Professor and Head of Department of Cancer Research and Molecular Medicine at Norwegian University of Science and Technology (NTNU) in Trondheim, Norway. Børset is a senior consultant in clinical immunology and transfusion medicine. He is doing research on molecular oncology, immunology, and cancer cells from patients with multiple myeloma – a type of cancer which is localized to the bone marrow.

== Honors ==
- 1997: Dr Alexander Malthes award for internal medicine

== Publications ==
- Articles
- List of publications by Magne Børset in BIBSYS (Norway)
