= E-Prime =

Restricted form of the English language

E-Prime (short for English-Prime or English Prime, sometimes É or E′) denotes a restricted form of English in which authors avoid all forms of the verb to be.

E-Prime excludes forms such as be, being, been, present tense forms (am, is, are), past tense forms (was, were) along with their positive and negative contractions (e.g. isn't, aren't, wasn't, weren't, ain't, twas, I'm, we're, you're, he's, she's, it's, they're, there's, that's).

Some scholars claim that E-Prime can clarify thinking and strengthen writing, while others doubt its utility.

== History ==
D. David Bourland Jr., who had studied under Alfred Korzybski, devised E-Prime as an addition to Korzybski's general semantics in the late 1940s. Bourland published the concept in a 1965 essay entitled "A Linguistic Note: Writing in E-Prime" (originally published in General Semantics Bulletin). The essay quickly generated controversy within the general semantics field, partly because practitioners of general semantics sometimes saw Bourland as attacking the verb 'to be' as such, and not just certain usages.

Bourland collected and published three volumes of essays in support of his innovation. The first (1991), co-edited by Paul Dennithorne Johnston, bore the title: To Be or Not: An E-Prime Anthology. For the second, More E-Prime: To Be or Not II, published in 1994, he added a third editor, Jeremy Klein. Bourland and Johnston then edited a third book, E-Prime III: a third anthology, published in 1997.

== Functions of "to be" ==
In English, the verb 'to be' (also known as the copula) has several distinct functions:

- identity: noun-phrase copula definite-noun
  - The cat is my only pet.
- class membership: definite-noun copula noun-phrase
  - Garfield is a cat.
- class inclusion: noun-phrase copula noun-phrase
  - A cat is an animal.
- predication: noun-phrase copula adjective
  - The cat is furry.
- ownership: noun-phrase copula possessive-noun
  - The cat is theirs.
- auxiliary: noun-phrase copula verb-phrase
  - The cat is sleeping. – with the copula being part of the progressive aspect with the present participle
  - The cat is being bitten by the dog. – with the copula being part of the passive with the past participle of a transitive verb
- existence: medial-proadverb-of-location copula noun-phrase
  - There is a cat.
- location: noun-phrase copula location-phrase
  - The cat is nowhere to be found.

Bourland sees specifically the "identity" and "predication" functions as pernicious but advocates the exclusion of all forms for the sake of simplicity. In the case of the "existence" form or the "location" form, terms such as exist, sit or lie could substitute for the copula.

Some ergative verbs may substitute the copula, including taste, feel, smell, sound, grow, hinge, remain, rest, stay, reside, and turn, among others.

== Examples ==
Colloquial English	E-Prime
The electron is a particle.	The electron functions as a particle.
The electron is a wave.	The electron functions as a wave.

One could rewrite the functions of "to be" as follows:

- "The cat is my only pet": "I have only a pet cat".
- "The cat is Garfield": "People call the cat Garfield".
- "Garfield is a cat": "Garfield belongs to the cat species".
- "A cat is an animal": "'Cat' denotes an animal".
- "The cat is furry": "The cat feels furry" / "The cat looks furry" / "The cat has fur".
- "The cat is sleeping": "The cat currently lies asleep".
- "The dog is chasing the cat": "At present, the dog chases the cat".
- "There is a cat": "A cat exists".
- "The cat is on the mat": "The cat currently sits on the mat".
- "The cat is here": anything context-specific: "I see/hear/smell/sense/suspect (the presence of) the cat here"

== Rationale ==
Bourland and other advocates also suggest that use of E-Prime leads to a less dogmatic style of language that reduces the possibility of misunderstanding or conflict.

Kellogg and Bourland describe misuse of the verb to be as creating a "deity mode of speech", allowing "even the most ignorant to transform their opinions magically into god-like pronouncements on the nature of things".

== Psychological effects ==
While teaching at the University of Florida, Alfred Korzybski counseled his students to

eliminate the infinitive and verb forms of "to be" from their vocabulary, whereas a second group continued to use "I am," "You are," "They are" statements as usual. For example, instead of saying, "I am depressed," a student was asked to eliminate that emotionally primed verb and to say something else, such as, "I feel depressed when ..." or "I tend to make myself depressed about ..."

Korzybski observed improvement "of one full letter grade" by "students who did not generalize by using that infinitive".

Albert Ellis advocated the use of E-Prime when discussing psychological distress to encourage framing these experiences as temporary (see also Solution focused brief therapy) and to encourage a sense of agency by specifying the subject of statements. According to Ellis, rational emotive behavior therapy "has favored E-Prime more than any other form of psychotherapy and I think it is still the only form of therapy that has some of its main books written in E-Prime". However, Ellis did not always use E-Prime because he believed it interferes with readability.

== Criticisms ==
Many authors have questioned E-Prime's effectiveness at improving readability and reducing prejudice (Lakoff, 1992; Murphy, 1992; Parkinson, 1992; Kenyon, 1992; French, 1992, 1993; Lohrey, 1993). These authors observed that communication under the copula ban can remain obscure and imply prejudice, while losing important speech patterns, such as identities and identification. Further, prejudices and judgments may become more difficult to notice or refute.

Various arguments against E-Prime (in the context of general semantics) have been conjectured:

- "Effective writing techniques" are not relevant to general semantics as a discipline, and therefore it should not be promoted as general semantics practice. E-Prime does not distinguish statements that disobey the principles of general semantics from statements that do not. It lacks consistency with the other tenets of general semantics and should not be included into the discipline.
- The advocates of E-Prime have not proven that it is easier to exclude the verb to be than to eliminate only the "is" of identity and the "is" of predication. It may well be easier to do the latter for many people. To be statements convey not only identity but also asymmetrical relations ("X is taller than Y"); negation ("A is different from B"); location ("The princess is in another castle"); auxiliary ("He is going to the store") etc., forms that would also have to be excluded.
- The elimination of a whole class of sentences results in fewer alternatives and is likely to make writing less, rather than more, interesting. One can improve bad writing more by reducing use of the verb 'to be' than by excluding it.
- The context often ameliorates the possible harmful effects from the use of the "is" of identity and the "is" of predication, so it is not necessary to eliminate all such sentences. For example, "He is a judge" in response to a question about what someone does for a living would not be questionable, although "He works as a judge" would be an equivalent E-Prime sentence.
- Excluding to be has little effect on eliminating identity. For example, a statement of apparently equal identification, "The silly ban on copula continues," can be made without the copula assuming an identity rather than asserting it, consequently hampering our awareness of it.
- Identity-in-the-language is not the same as the far more important identity-in-reaction (identification). General semantics cuts the link between the two through the practice of silence on the objective levels, adopting a self-reflexive attitude, e.g., "as I see it" "it seems to me" etc., and by the use of quotation marks—without using E-Prime. One of the best languages for time-binding is mathematics, which relies heavily on the notion of equivalence and equality. For the purposes of time-binding, it may be better to cut the link between identity-in-the-language and identity-in-reaction.

According to an article (written in E-Prime and advocating a role for E-Prime in ESL and EFL programs) published by the Office of English Language Programs of the Bureau of Educational and Cultural Affairs in the State Department of the United States, "Requiring students to avoid the verb to be on every assignment would deter students from developing other fundamental skills of fluent writing."

== Publications ==
- Laws of Form by G. Spencer-Brown, 1969 (except for one statement)
- Quantum Psychology, by Robert Anton Wilson (1990)
- Worlds of Wonder: How to Write Science Fiction & Fantasy by David Gerrold has a chapter about (and written in) E-Prime
- The New American Standard Bible in E-Prime, composed by Dr. David F. Maas
- Scoundrel Days: A Memoir, 2017 Brentley Frazer
- An Insider’s Guide to Robert Anton Wilson by Eric Wagner
- A New Guide to Rational Living, by Albert Ellis and Robert A. Harper (1975)
- Warrens Witches Psionics, by John Tait (2024). ISBN 978-1-0687390-0-2 (paperback), ISBN 978-1-0687390-1-9 (ebook)

== See also ==
- Ego eimi – First person singular present active indicative of the verb "to be" in ancient Greek
- I am (biblical term) – Christian term used in the Bible
- English passive voice – Grammatical voice in the English language
- Epistemology – Philosophical study of knowledge
- Implicit attitude
- Language ideology § Language use and structure
- Language proficiency – Measurement of linguistic ability
- Linguistic philosophy – View emphasising importance of language in philosophy
- Linguistic relativity – Hypothesis of language influencing thought
- Ontology – Philosophical study of being
- Perspectivism – Philosophical principle that perspectives and epistemology are always linked
- Point of view (philosophy) – Concept of personal perspective in philosophy
- Temporality – Concept in philosophy
- Universality (philosophy) – Concept that some ideas have universal applicability
- Wooden language – Language used to divert attention
- Zero copula – Lacking or omission of a "to be" verb, common in some languages and stylistic in others
