= ERIH =

ERIH may refer to:

- European Route of Industrial Heritage
- ERIH PLUS, previously ERIH or European Reference Index for the Humanities

== See also ==
- includes various people with forename or surname Erih
