= Paul Amato =

American sociologist and criminologist

- Born: Paul R. Amato
- Education: James Cook University (PhD, 1983)
- Scientific career
- Fields: Sociology
- Workplaces: Pennsylvania State University

Paul R. Amato is an American sociologist who is a professor at Pennsylvania State University in the Department of Sociology and Criminology. He is most well-known for his research in social science related fields. His research focuses on marital quality, divorce, and other family related issues.

== Works ==
Amato has published over 100 academic journals over the course of his career. His publications have earned him several awards, including the Stanley Cohen Distinguished Research Award from the American Association of Family and Conciliation Courts in 2002 and the Reuben Hill Award from the National Council on Family Relations in 2003. He was listed as a notable scientist in Thomson Reuters' Highly Cited Researchers in 2004, which ranked him as being among the top 1% most cited scientists at the time.
