= Harris Eyre =

Australian neuroscientist

Harris Eyre is an Australian physician, neuroscientist, entrepreneur, economic strategist, and author. He is most noted for his work on the brain economy

According to the McKinsey Health Institute and the World Economic Forum Brain Economy Action Forum, the brain economy is a new economic paradigm that prioritizes brain capital, encompassing brain health and brain skills, as its core asset. Driven by a neuroscience renaissance, it responds to the growing demand for brain skills — cognitive, emotional, and social — in the modern workforce.

Harris was the senior author of the first technical paper on the brain economy published in 2020 (Smith et al. Molecular Psychiatry) and co-led the early OECD Neuroscience-Inspired Economics Initiative. He now leads the Global Brain Economy Initiative and is co-chair of the Nature Medicine Commission on Brain Health for Economic Resilience.

Prominent organizations now believe the world is increasingly relying on brain capital, where a premium is put on brain skills and brain health (e.g., individual's cognitive, emotional, and social brain resources), and that investing in building brain capital is fundamental to meet modern societal challenges and to drive innovation.

Eyre studies transdisciplinary or convergence science and was lead editor of the Oxford University Press book, Convergence Mental Health: A Roadmap for Transdisciplinary Innovation. In his work, he melds and fuses insights from precision medicine, clinical care, entrepreneurship, convergence science, consumer participation, workforce development, economics, public policy and diplomacy.

Eyre is a migraineur and wrote a short story titled "My migraines are a super power" for the European Federation of Neurological Associations.

== Education ==
Eyre grew up in Mackay, Queensland, Australia, attended the Whitsunday Anglican School where he was awarded the 2024 Young Old Scholar Award. He completed his undergraduate medical degree (Bachelor of Medicine, Bachelor of Surgery (MBBS) with Honours) at James Cook University in North Queensland, Australia, where he was awarded the 2017 Early Career Alumni Award. His medical education specialized in rural, remote, Indigenous and tropical health. He then completed his PhD in neuroscience at the University of Adelaide. During his PhD, he was awarded the W.G. Walker Fulbright Scholarship to study at UCLA. The W.G. Walker Fulbright Scholarship is awarded to the top Australian Fulbright Scholar annually.

== Career ==
=== Think tanks ===
Eyre works with leading think tanks including the McKinsey Health Institute, The Baker Institute for Public Policy at Rice University, the Meadows Mental Health Policy Institute, the Euro-Mediterranean Economists Association, The Brookings Institution, the Center for European Policy Studies, and the Global Brain Health Institute.

=== Convergence mental health ===
Eyre is the lead editor of 'Convergence Mental Health: A Roadmap Towards Transdisciplinary Innovation' with Oxford University Press. The book description as outlined on the Oxford University Press website reads "Modern mental health issues are characterized by their complex, multi-systemic nature and broad societal impact, making them poorly suited to siloed approaches of thinking and innovation. Convergence science integrates knowledge, tools, and thought strategies from various fields and is the focal point where novel insights arise. Convergence Mental Health presents a blueprint for leveraging convergence science within the context of mental health in order to improve patient outcomes and health care systems."

This book includes contributions from organizations including the Milken Institute, APEC, OECD, Harvard University, Stanford University and the Mayo Clinic.

Notable chapter contributors include Julio Licinio, Vikram Patel and Reid Hoffman.

Notable quotes of support come from Jeff Cummings, John Arnold, Peter C Farrell, Victor Dzau and Ernestine Fu.

=== Brain economy ===
The brain economy model recognizes solving brain health challenges will require major transitions across most major sectors. Each of these is complex and will require a systems approach. Incremental change will not be sufficient and there are few silver bullets. No single technology, policy, or actor alone can achieve these critical shifts. Rather, it will take a community of people working together across systems to employ innovative solutions and accelerate change.

Eyre led the development of the Brain Capital Grand Strategy. This includes exploring and actioning Brain Capital in-all-policies, articulating and actioning the Brain Capital Investment Plan, and developing a Brain Capital Index.

He co-led the OECD Neuroscience-inspired Policy Initiative. This Initiative sought to advance brain-based policy and investment innovations. On January 27, 2021, the OECD held a Brain Capital Event on this topic. Notable speakers included Angel Gurria (OECD Secretary General), Admiral William H McRaven, Thomas C Leppert, Megan Greene and Francesca Colombo. On March 26, 2021, the OECD held an event titled 'Innovations to Address Women's Brain Health Inequalities'. Notable speakers included Juan Yermo (OECD Chief of Staff), Maureen Hackett, Antonella Santuccione, Sofia Noori, Sandra Bond Chapman and Megan Green. On June 10, 2021, the OECD held an event titled 'Rethinking Productivity: Insights from Neuroscience'. Notable speakers included George Vradenburg, Andy Keller, Husseini K Manji, Chiara Crisculo and Andrew S Nevin.

He leads the Brain Capital Alliance. This is an expanded, multi-national and multi-organisational programme.

The brain economy has been profiled in the following policy innovation fora:

- World Economic Forum

- United Nations General Assembly

- Wharton Neuroscience Initiative Summit

- Women in Government Leadership and Innovation Summit

- FENS Forum

- Congressional Neuroscience Caucus

- US House Select Committee on Economic Disparity and Fairness in Growth

- Lundbeck position statement on brain health

- WHO position statement on brain health

- Brookings Policy Paper proposing a White House Brain Capital Council

- European Brain Initiative

- United Nations Development Programme Human Development Report

- PwC

Eyre is an advisor to the University of Sydney's Mental Wealth Initiative (MWI). Notable members of the MWI Advisory Panel include former Australian Prime Minister, the Hon. Malcolm Turnbull, Businesswoman, Lucy Turnbull, AO, Economist and Lawyer, Professor Allan Fels, AO, economist and former Labor Party politician, the Hon. Dr Craig Emerson, and World Bank economist, Professor William Hynes.

=== Academia ===
Eyre published 200 + articles and chapters.

In his research career, he has co-authored numerous works including the 'Brain Capital Grand Strategy', 'B rain Capital Industrial Innovation Policy', 'Comprehensive Brain Deal' 'Green Brain Capital', 'Neuroshield','Brain Health Executive', 'Sleep Diplomacy', 'Responsible Innovation in Mental Health ', 'Brain-based Stakeholder Capitalism', 'Brain Health Gap', 'Measurement-based Cognitive Care', 'Mental Health Innovation Diplomacy' , the 'Brain Health Diplomacy' model, the 'Mars Mental Health' model, the 'Phase-specific Neuroimmune Model of Depression', a meta-analysis of chemokines in depression, a meta-analysis of pharmacogenetic-based decision support tools for depression, a randomized controlled trial of yoga to prevent dementia and the model of 'Convergence Psychiatry'.

He maintains advisory roles with Baylor College of Medicine, Houston Methodist, the Davos Alzheimer's Collaborative. and the Latin American Brain Health Institute.

== Public and media appearances ==
His academic work has been profiled in The New York Times, the Financial Post, neo.life, STAT, the Australian Financial Review, the 'Financial Times', Univision, Dallas Morning News and Les Echos.

== Awards ==
Eyre has been awarded various awards throughout his career including:

- 2024 Young Old Scholar Award from the Whitsunday Anglican School
- 2024 Texas Impact Enterprise Award
- 2020 Innovation Award for the Australian American Chamber of Commerce
- 2018 Forbes 30 Under 30 Asia Listing
- 2015 W.G. Walker Fulbright Scholar
- 2017 Victorian State Finalist for Young Australian of the Year
- 2017 Outstanding Early Career Alumni Award for the College of Medicine and Dentistry at James Cook University
- 2013 Junior Medical Officer of the Year, Australian Medical Association of Queensland

== Works ==
=== Select research articles ===
- The global brain capital dashboard. The Brookings Institution
- Build back brainier: base policies on brain science. A chapter in the OECD book Systemic Recovery.
- Investing in Late Life Brain Capital. Innovations in Aging. 2022
- Eyre, Harris A.; Ayadi, Rym; Ellsworth, William; Aragam, Gowri; Smith, Erin; Dawson, Walter D.; Ibanez, Agustin; Altimus, Cara; Berk, Michael; Manji, Husseini K.; Storch, Eric A.; Leboyer, Marion; Kawaguchi, Naoko; Freeman, Michael; Brannelly, Patrick; Manes, Facundo; Chapman, Sandra B.; Cummings, Jeffrey; Graham, Carol; Miller, Benjamin F.; Sarnyai, Zoltan; Meyer, Retsina; Hynes, William (5 May 2021). "Building brain capital". Neuron. 109 (9): 1430–1432. doi:10.1016/j.neuron.2021.04.007. PMC 8240507. PMID 33957073.
- Dawson, Walter D.; Bobrow, Kirsten; Ibanez, Agustin; Booi, Laura; Pintado-Caipa, Maritza; Yamamoto, Stacey; Tarnanas, Ioannis; Evans, Timothy; Comas-Herrera, Adelina; Cummings, Jeffrey; Kaye, Jeffrey; Yaffe, Kristine; Miller, Bruce L.; Eyre, Harris A. (1 December 2020). "The necessity of diplomacy in brain health". The Lancet Neurology. 19 (12): 972–974. doi:10.1016/S1474-4422(20)30358-6. PMC 8315828. PMID 33212057. S2CID 226974108.
- Smith, Erin; Ali, Diab; Wilkerson, Bill; Dawson, Walter D.; Sobowale, Kunmi; Reynolds, Charles; Berk, Michael; Lavretsky, Helen; Jeste, Dilip; Ng, Chee H.; Soares, Jair C.; Aragam, Gowri; Wainer, Zoe; Manji, Husseini K.; Licinio, Julio; Lo, Andrew W.; Storch, Eric; Fu, Ernestine; Leboyer, Marion; Tarnanas, Ioannis; Ibanez, Agustin; Manes, Facundo; Caddick, Sarah; Fillit, Howard; Abbott, Ryan; Robertson, Ian H.; Chapman, Sandra B.; Au, Rhoda; Altimus, Cara M.; Hynes, William; Brannelly, Patrick; Cummings, Jeffrey; Eyre, Harris A. (26 October 2020). "A Brain Capital Grand Strategy: toward economic reimagination". Molecular Psychiatry. 26 (1): 3–22. doi:10.1038/s41380-020-00918-w. PMC 8244537. PMID 33100330. S2CID 225063066.
- Eyre, Harris; Baune, Bernhard T. (1 September 2012). "Neuroplastic changes in depression: A role for the immune system". Psychoneuroendocrinology. 37 (9): 1397–1416. doi:10.1016/j.psyneuen.2012.03.019. PMID 22525700. S2CID 29560032.
- Siddarth, Prabha; Burggren, Alison C.; Eyre, Harris A.; Small, Gary W.; Merrill, David A. (12 April 2018). "Sedentary behavior associated with reduced medial temporal lobe thickness in middle-aged and older adults". PLOS ONE. 13 (4) e0195549. Bibcode:2018PLoSO..1395549S. doi:10.1371/journal.pone.0195549. PMC 5896959. PMID 29649304.
- Eyre, Harris A.; Ellsworth, William; Fu, Ernestine; Manji, Husseini K.; Berk, Michael (1 September 2020). "Responsible innovation in technology for mental health care". The Lancet Psychiatry. 7 (9): 728–730. doi:10.1016/S2215-0366(20)30192-9. PMC 7440881. PMID 32828153. S2CID 221190638.
- Chang, Donald D.; Storch, Eric A.; Black, Lance; Berk, Michael; Pellis, Neal; Lavretsky, Helen; Sutton, Jeffrey; Ternes, Kylie; Shepanek, Marc; Smith, Erin; Abbott, Ryan; Eyre, Harris A. (1 September 2020). "Promoting Tech Transfer Between Space and Global Mental Health". Aerospace Medicine and Human Performance. 91 (9): 737–745. doi:10.3357/AMHP.5589.2020. PMID 32867906. S2CID 221404577.

=== Selected commentaries ===
- 2024 Op Ed in Dallas Morning News titled 'Brain capital is the new oil boom'.
- 2023 Op Ed in Dallas Morning News with Admiral William H. McRaven titled 'Strengthen brain health, strengthen the country'.
- 2022 Commentary in Contemporary OBGYN titled 'Violence against women and acquired brain injuries'
- 2021 Op Ed in Dallas Morning News titled 'Social media is changing our brains'
