= CRIStin =

- Website type: Research information system
- Available in: Norwegian; English
- Owner: Royal Ministry of Education and Research
- Website: cristin.no
- Launched: 2004; 22 years ago
- Current status: Active

CRIStin (Current Research Information System in Norway) is the national research information system of Norway, and is owned by the Royal Ministry of Education and Research. CRIStin documents all scholarly publications by Norwegian researchers, and complements the BIBSYS database, which focuses on storage and retrieval of data pertaining to research, teaching and learning – historically metadata related to library resources. CRIStin is the first database of its kind worldwide.

The CRIStin system includes the Norwegian Scientific Index, a comprehensive government-owned bibliographic database aimed at covering and rating all serious academic publication channels worldwide, including academic journals and publishers. Publication channels may be nominated by Norwegian academics, and the database does not accept self-nominations by publishers. The index includes journal-level ratings and book publisher-level ratings. Publishers and journals may be assigned the rating 1 (standard rating for publication channels that meet basic academic quality criteria), 2 (rating for internationally leading publication channels), 0 (non-academic) or X (possibly predatory publication channels).

The database was started at the University of Oslo, but later became a national system operated on behalf of the government. As the first and largest database of its kind, the Norwegian Scientific Index is also used in other countries than Norway, e.g. in Sweden and South Africa, and it is the model of similar indices in other countries, including Denmark. It also serves as the basis for a joint Nordic bibliographic database that is being developed under the auspices of the Nordic governments and the Nordic Council. Additionally, the European database ERIH PLUS is now a sister project of the Norwegian Scientific Index, after it was transferred from the European Science Foundation to the Norwegian Centre for Research Data in 2014.

== History ==
The CRIStin system traces its roots to the research documentation system of the University of Oslo, that was developed during the 1990s and known as Forskningsdokumentasjon ved Universitetet i Oslo ("Research Documentation at the University of Oslo"), abbreviated ForskDok. Until 2010/2011 Norway had two competing research documentation databases. Almost all colleges and universities used the BIBSYS FORSKDOK database, that was developed from 1991 as part of the national BIBSYS system, itself established in 1972. The University of Oslo, the country's preeminent university, chose to develop its own and similarly named system. In 2004, the research documentation system of the University of Oslo formed the basis for a joint system, renamed Frida, for the University of Oslo and the then three other Norwegian universities, but excluding the country's many colleges and other research institutions. In 2010, Frida was transferred to the government and became a national research documentation system, and was renamed CRIStin. The BIBSYS FORSKDOK database was then closed in 2011. CRIStin is being integrated into the National Science Archive (Nasjonalt vitenarkiv).

== Norwegian Scientific Index ==
Ratings in the Norwegian Scientific Index
Rating	Explanation
Level 2	The highest rating, reserved for the internationally most prestigious publication channels (journals and publishers). A maximum of 20% of (serious) publication channels in a given discipline may be given this rating. Generates substantially increased funding.
Level 1	The standard rating, which designates publication channels (journals and publishers) as academic. Intended to cover at least 80% of (serious) publication channels in a given discipline. Generates funding.
Level 0	The lowest normal rating, which designates publication channels (journals and publishers) as non-academic. Generates no funding.
Level X	Level x are publication channels where CRIStin are uncertain whether the publication channel should be approved or not, in light of current criteria and available information. As long as the publication channel are at level X, the level it had before will be the counting level in terms of publication points.

The Norwegian Scientific Index (Norwegian: Norsk vitenskapsindeks, NVI) is a comprehensive Norwegian bibliographic database established by the Norwegian government, aimed at covering all academic publication channels worldwide, i.e. academic journals, series with ISSN, and scholarly presses. It is operated by the government-owned company Norwegian Centre for Research Data on behalf of the Royal Ministry of Education and Research, and forms one of the key parts that together make up the CRIStin system.

The index divides journals and publishers considered to meet academic quality criteria (including peer review) into "level 1" and "level 2." Journals and publishers are rated separately, with journal-level ratings applying to journal publications and publisher-level ratings applying to books. Level 1 is the standard rating for publication channels considered to meet academic quality criteria, and is intended to cover at least 80% of all serious journals and publishers in a given discipline. Level 2 is the highest rating and is reserved for the internationally most prestigious journals and publishers within the discipline. "Level 2" status is granted by national expert committees for each discipline, and may be given to a maximum of 20% of all publication channels in a given discipline.

Funding of research institutions in Norway is partially tied to the Norwegian Scientific Index, and only recognised "level 1" or "level 2" publications generate funding. "Level 2" publications generate significantly increased funding compared to "level 1" publications.

Journals and publishers that are designated as not academic are identified as "level 0," which means that they don't count in the official academic career system or public funding of research institutions. The "0" rating may imply that the publication channel lacks adequate peer review or that it in some other way doesn't meet basic quality standards for academic journals, that it is a trade journal with no academic aspirations or some other form of entirely non-academic publication, or that it is regarded as predatory. Such publication channels are not systematically included in the index, and the rating may, but doesn't necessarily, indicate that the publication channel was nominated for "level 1" status and failed to be approved as such, or that it has been downgraded from "level 1" status, e.g. due to predatory publishing practices. Some Norwegian publications are included in the database and identified as level 0 mainly for legacy reasons, that is, they were included in the database's predecessors before the rating system was invented; they include a number of trade journals, newspapers and other non-academic publications.

In 2021 the National Publication Committee introduced a new level called "level X" for journals and publishers that they are soliciting comments on whether it should be approved or not. Becoming operational in the autumn of 2021, the National Publication Committee linked the creation of level X to concerns regarding the publisher MDPI. The new level became active in September 2021; of the 13 initial journals included in the level, five were MDPI journals. In 2022, 10 of the 13 initial journals are rated as non-academic (level 0), while one (Geosciences) has been rated as academic (level 1). As of May 2022, there were 7 journals in the list, out of which 2 from the initial journals. As of February 2024, there is one publisher (Bentham Science Publishers) and 46 individual journals in this list, including 13 from MDPI, nine from Hindawi, and seven from Elsevier.

The Norwegian Scientific Index is also used in other countries than Norway, both formally and informally. For example, South Africa started using the index in 2016. The Norwegian Scientific Index also forms the basis for the Nordic List, a joint Nordic bibliographic database that is developed under the auspices of the Nordic Council and the governments of the Nordic countries. As of February 2023, the Nordic List website from its 2018 presentation is not functional.

The responsibility for the European Reference Index for the Humanities and the Social Sciences, now called ERIH PLUS, was transferred from the European Science Foundation to the Norwegian Centre for Research Data in 2014 and is now available on the same website as the Norwegian Scientific Index.

== See also ==
- ERIH PLUS, a European sister database of the Norwegian Scientific Index
- Journal ranking by country
