= Open access in Norway =

Open access scholarly communication of Norway can be searched via the Norwegian Open Research Archive (NORA). (Note: "The country’s total scholarly publication output is registered in Ceres, formerly CRIStin, the Current Research Information System in Norway.") "A national repository consortium, BIBSYS Brage, operates shared electronic publishing system on behalf of 56 institutions." Cappelen Damm Akademisk, Nordic Open Access Scholarly Publishing, University of Tromsø, and Universitetsforlaget belong to the Open Access Scholarly Publishers Association. Norwegian signatories to the international "Open Access 2020" campaign, launched in 2016, include CRIStin, Norsk institutt for bioøkonomi (Norwegian Institute of Bioeconomy Research, NIBIO), Norwegian Institute of Palaeography and Historical Philology, Norwegian University of Science and Technology, Oslo and Akershus University College of Applied Sciences, University of Tromsø, University of Bergen, University of Oslo, and Wikimedia Norge.

== Repositories ==
There are a number of collections of scholarship in Norway housed in digital open access repositories.

== Timeline ==
Key events in the development of open access in Norway include the following:

- 2001
  - 26 November: Norwegian Wikipedia, an open educational resource, begins publication.
- 2003
  - Norsk Institutt for Palaeografi og Historisk Filologi signs the Berlin Declaration on Open Access to Knowledge in the Sciences and Humanities.
- 2006
  - Munin Conference on Scholarly Publishing begins in Tromsø.
- 2007
  - May: OpenAccess.no website launched.
  - 27 June: Ministry of Education and Research State Secretary Lisbet Rugtvedt endorses open access.
  - November: National policy adopted "requiring government agencies to provide open access to any geodata they gather or produce."
- 2009
  - Research Council of Norway signs the Berlin Declaration.
- 2010
  - CRIStin (Current Research Information System in Norway) launched.
- 2011
  - 18 February: University of Tromsø creates fund to cover author fees.
- 2013
  - Research Council of Norway pays for 40 open access journals.
  - Norwegian University of Science and Technology creates fund to cover author fees.
- 2017
  - Comparative Research Programme on Poverty (CROP), a government agency, begins providing "open access to two of its publications: the CROP Series in International Poverty Poverty Studies and Global Challenges - Working Paper Series."
- 2019
  - Used title of ISSC Comparative Research Programme on Poverty (CROP). Transitioned into a new programme of University of Norway and A-XM6956 - International Science Council (ISC).
