= Brentley Frazer =

Australian poet

Dr Brentley Frazer
- Born: January 1972 (age 54); Australia
- Education: Ph.D (creative writing). Master of Arts (writing).
- Occupation: poet/writer
- Known for: Poetry, Scoundrel Days: A Memoir
- Notable work: Scoundrel Days: A Memoir 2017, Aboriginal to Nowhere: new poems 2016, A Dark Samadhi: poems + microtexts 2003
- Style: Dirty Realism Grunge lit Transgressive fiction creative non-fiction
- Title: Dr
- Website: https://www.brentley.com

Brentley Frazer is an Australian poet widely known for his dirty realist, gritty, Gen. X memoir Scoundrel Days (UQP, 2017).

Brentley has been a guest at numerous literary festivals, poetry readings, culture conserves and academic conferences, including: The Queensland Poetry Festival, The Australian National Poetry Festival, The Sydney Poetry Festival, Brisbane Writers Festival, The Wellington International Poetry Festival, The Oxfam Bookfest in London, "Spoken" and "Couplet" at the State Library of Queensland, The Sydney Writers Festival, Asia Pacific Writers and Translators and the Australasian Association of Writing Programs (Massey University 2014, Swinburne University 2015, University of Canberra 2016).

From 2001 to 2013 he was publisher and editor of Retort Magazine ISSN 1445-7164 and was co-founder of The Vision Area (1998–2000) and a founding member of the Brisbane spoken word event Speed Poets (2003–2017). In 2012 he completed a MA at James Cook University under the supervision of Lindsay Simpson. In December 2017 he was awarded a Doctor of Philosophy from Griffith University under the supervision of Nigel Krauth and the poet Anthony Lawrence.

Brentley's memoir Scoundrel Days: A Memoir was published by University of Queensland Press in March, 2017.

== Published works ==
- Novels
  - Scoundrel Days: A Memoir, UQP University of Queensland Press (Australia, 2017) ISBN 9780702258923
  - Brilliant Future - The Butcher's Saga (with Fakie Wilde), Impressed Publishing (Australia, 2004) ISBN 9781500389581
- Poetry
  - Opera of Destruction, Homunculus Publications (Australia, 1991) ISBN 0646091956
  - Oneirodynia, laTorre Press (Australia, 1993)
  - Blood Psalms, Sabazeos Books (Australia, 1995)
  - Fugue, Sabazeos Books (Australia, 1996) ISBN 9780646248592
  - A Dark Samadhi, PCPress (Australia, New Zealand, 2003) ISBN 0975039709
  - Memories Like Angels at a Ball Tripping Over Their Gowns, Black Star Books (Australia 2007)
  - Tableland Phantoms, Retort Books (Digital 2013)
  - Kulturkampf: new + selected poems, Bareknuckle Books (Australia, 2015) ISBN 9780994186119
  - Aboriginal to Nowhere: new poems, HeadworX (New Zealand, 2016) ISBN 9780473365677
- Academic Papers
  - Aboriginal to Nowhere ~ Song Cycle of the Post Modern Dispossessed
  - Untitled Plane Crash
  - Beyond Is: Creative Writing with English Prime
  - A Greener Pasture

== Publications (as editor) ==
- Journals
  - Retort Magazine ISSN 1445-7164 (2001–2014)
  - Bareknuckle Poet Journal of Letters ISSN 2204-0420 (2013–2020)
  - Bareknuckle Poet Journal of Letters Anthology Volume 01, 2015
  - Bareknuckle Poet Journal of Letters Anthology Volume 02, 2016
- Books
  - We the Mapless: new and selected poems by Ian Mcbryde
  - Travel Under Any Star: Collected Short Stories by Venero Armanno
  - Rock & Roll: Selected poems in Five Sets by Mark Pirie
  - For All The Veronicas: The Dog Who Staid - New Poems by Andrew Galan
  - Improvised Dirges: New & Selected Poems by A. G. Pettet

== Sources ==
- "Search results for 'frazer%2C brentley' - Books". Trove.
