= European Science Foundation =

European science organisation

ESF
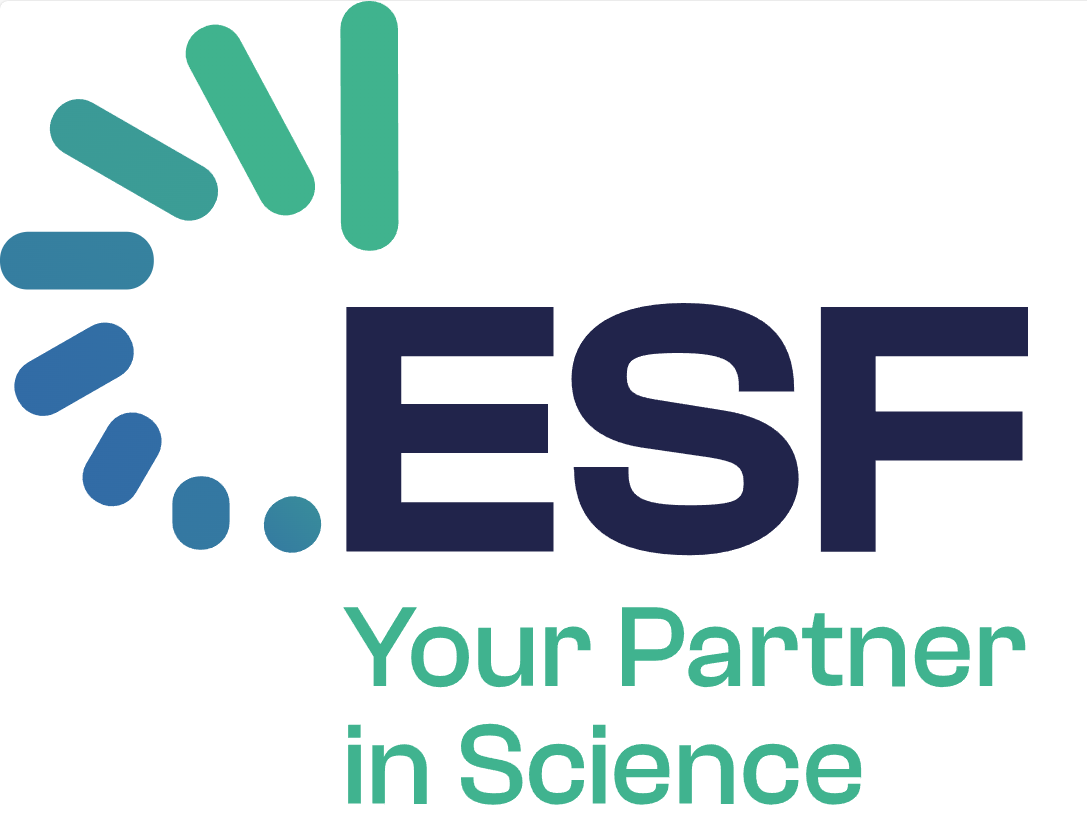
- Formation: July 1974; 52 years ago
- Legal status: Non-profit association
- Location: Strasbourg, France
- Members: 10 (2025)
- Staff: 56
- Website: www.esf.org

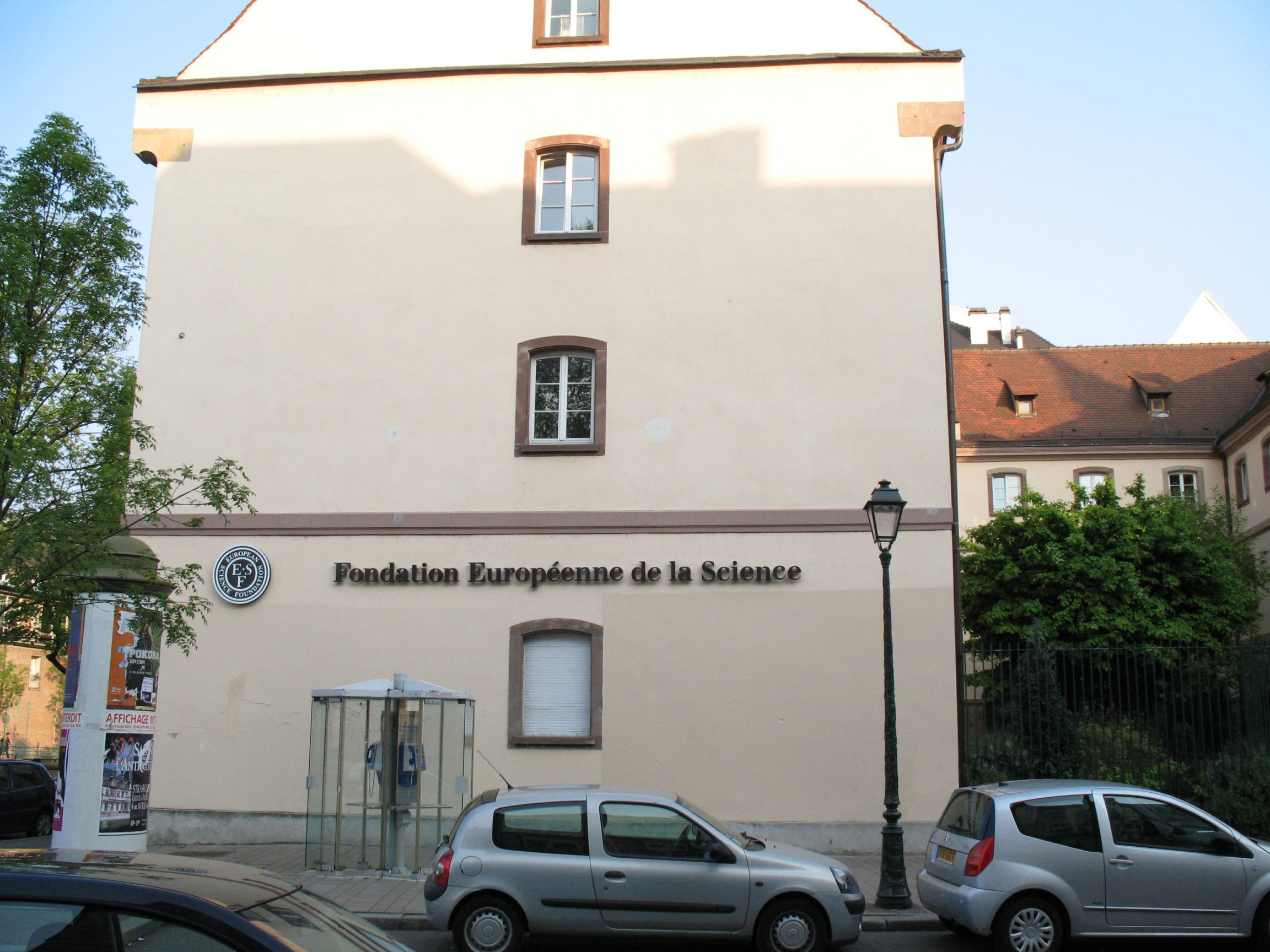
Office in Strasbourg

The European Science Foundation (ESF) is a non-profit association based in Strasbourg.

Established in 1974 by a group of national research organisations, ESF historically supported pan-European scientific collaboration through networking instruments and programme coordination. Since the 2010s, following changes in European research governance, ESF's role has evolved and it now operates primarily as a facilitator for research assessment, research programme management, hosting of scientific structures and support for EU funded projects on a partnership basis.

In 2025, the association – which operates under the French and Local law in Alsace–Moselle – has 10 members from 8 countries: Belgium, Bulgaria, France, Hungary, Luxembourg, Romania, Serbia and Türkiye. It has 56 staff members.

== Activities ==
Since the restructuring of European research coordination mechanisms in the 2010s, ESF's activities have focused on management and evaluation services for research projects, funding programmes and scientific networks.

=== Research assessment and grant evaluation ===
ESF provides research assessment and grant evaluation support for research funding organisations, universities and public authorities. These services include managing application procedures, organising expert peer review and panel meetings, and preparing assessment reports to inform funding or selection decisions. ESF maintains a Community of Experts drawn from a wide range of disciplines to support these processes; according to ESF, expert honoraria are paid for timely and substantiated reviews.

=== Management of research funding programmes ===
On behalf of public and private funders, ESF manages research funding programmes, including call administration and publication, proposal evaluation, contracting and post award monitoring. As an example, the collaborative programme Fight Kids Cancer funds research in paediatric oncology through competitive calls administered with ESF support.

=== Hosting and support for scientific structures ===
ESF hosts and supports scientific committees, coalitions, networks and associations, providing governance, financial administration, operational coordination, and communication services. Hosted or supported entities have included the European Space Sciences Committee (ESSC), the Nuclear Physics European Collaboration Committee (NuPECC), the Committee on Radio Astronomy Frequencies (CRAF) and the European Astrobiology Institute (EAI), among others. ESF also hosts the secretariat of cOAlition s, the HERA network, the Global Research Initiative on Open Science (GRIOS) and the Coalition for Advancing Research Assessment (CoARA).

=== Support for EU funded projects ===
ESF coordinates and contributes to EU funded projects (29 overall contributions under Horizon 2020 and 24 under Horizon Europe), including proposal development, project coordination, implementation, financial and administrative management, communication and compliance with funding and reporting requirements.

== History ==
=== Establishment (1974) and early role ===
The European Science Foundation (ESF) was established in 1974 by national research organisations to facilitate cross border scientific collaboration and to represent an independent, fundamental research led approach to European cooperation. A first meeting was held near Stockholm on 2–3 May 1974, where representatives from 45 research organisations across 14 European countries agreed to create the ESF. This initiative followed earlier discussions at Gif sur Yvette in 1973, gathering research councils from 17 countries to consider a European-level mechanism for fostering fundamental research. Headquartered in Strasbourg, its principal aims included advancing cooperation in basic research, promoting the mobility of researchers, supporting the free circulation of scientific information and ideas, and facilitating the harmonisation of basic research activities conducted by its member organisations. Additional objectives encompassed fostering cooperation in the use of existing research facilities, coordinating the assessment and execution of major scientific projects, supporting shared access to costly specialised services, and providing grants to encourage collaborative actions and research schemes.

=== Early instruments and initiatives (late 1970s–2000s) ===
In the late 1970s and 1980s, ESF started to develop instruments to support research collaboration, by coordinating exploratory workshops to identify new research directions and foster early networking, the foundations of what later became Research Networking Programmes (RNPs), designed to support long-term thematic networks of nationally funded research groups, evaluated through international peer review. By the late 2000s, RNP‑related workshops, training events and exchanges involved several thousand researchers annually.

=== Thematic coordination and major research initiatives (1990s–2000s) ===
ESF's standing committees and expert boards coordinated programmes, evaluated proposals, and guided long term scientific agendas in areas including humanities, life and environmental sciences, physical and engineering sciences and social sciences. ESF additionally supported large scale scientific undertakings, including the Ocean Drilling Programme, the European Geotraverse Project, environmental toxicology programmes, forest ecosystem networks, and the Greenland Icecore Project.

=== Expansion and consolidation (2000s–2009) ===
Between 2000 and 2009, its membership grew up to 77 member organisations across 30 countries. ESF broadened its portfolio and structured its activities into three major domains: foresighting, science synergy, and science management. ESF also contributed to European science policy by providing platforms for coordination among national research organisations and supporting the development of the European Research Area (ERA). In 2008, ESF at the time served as the implementation agency for EUROCOREs' (European Heads of Research Councils) collaborative research programme, supported by national agencies in over 30 countries. During these years, it collaborated with EUROHORCs on joint policy initiatives that informed changes in research governance, including developments surrounding the establishment of the European Research Council (ERC).

The European Reference Index for the Humanities (ERIH) was launched by the ESF in 2002 through its at the time Standing Committee for the Humanities as a reference index of humanities journals. From 2008, ERIH's initial A/B/C banding drew criticism from editors and learned societies, who warned it could be misused for research assessment; sector media reported coordinated protests and opt-outs. In January 2009 ESF dropped the letter grades and replaced them with descriptive categories.

=== Portugal research unit evaluation controversy (2013–2014) ===
Independent coverage reported controversy surrounding the evaluation of Portuguese research units commissioned by the national funder FCT and supported by ESF; reports highlighted methodological criticism and political repercussions, including leadership changes at FCT, although an independent panel concluded that the evaluation followed international standards.

=== Shift in European research funding structures and transition period (2011–2014) ===
In October 2011, the majority of the ESF's national research-funding and research-performing member organisations established Science Europe, a Brussels-based association created to represent their collective interests and coordinate research policy at the European level. This represented a strategic shift away from ESF's traditional roles in managing research programmes and distributing funding and toward a dedicated platform for policy advocacy and alignment with European Union institutions.

Voided of its former coordination functions, media anticipated the dissolution of ESF. Reporting at the time also documented the cancellation of ESF programme calls and the planned reorientation away from earlier funding/networking roles. Local reporting noted concerns that the ESF might be dissolved or relocated to Brussels as European-level bodies consolidated, highlighted declining staff numbers, and flagged a late-November 2012 general assembly as a decision point. In December 2012, ESF's members deferred a final decision on the organisation's future until end of 2014.

In 2014, responsibility for ERIH was transferred from ESF to Norway's NSD – Norwegian Centre for Research Data, and the index was relaunched and expanded as ERIH PLUS to include social sciences.

Over the same period, EU research funding was consolidated within the European Commission's framework programmes, notably Horizon 2020. The programme, launched in 2014 with a budget of nearly €80 billion (around €30 billion more than the preceding Commission's Seventh Framework Programme), was designed to streamline EU research and innovation initiatives under a single framework, strengthen Europe's global competitiveness, and address major societal challenges through coordinated funding at Union level. In 2014, the intergovernmental COST programme (European Cooperation in Science and Technology) – also long administered by ESF under FP6 and FP7 – became legally independent as the COST Association under Belgian law.

During its general assembly late 2014, ESF finally avoided dissolution with members approving changes in statute to allow new categories of membership and a shift to a service oriented model focused on programme management, peer review and evaluation. Commentary in Europhysics News in 2015 further described ESF's budget reductions, the discontinuation of earlier programmes, and the move toward science management support.

=== ESF Science Connect (2016–2023) ===
From 2016 to 2023, ESF operated under the brand "ESF-Science Connect", an expert organisation supporting institutions for the implementation of scientific assessment of research proposals submitted to funding organisations, programmes, focusing mainly on administrative services, while applying to participate in Horizon Europe projects. Regional press reported in April 2017 that ESF confirmed its presence in Strasbourg "on different bases", describing a transition from roughly 120 employees to 19 after three redundancy plans (two voluntary, one compulsory).

=== Today ===
ESF's new strategy for 2023–2028 focuses on four main lines of action (research assessment and grant evaluation, programme management, hosting of scientific networks, and EU project management). The association has since been operating under "ESF" and celebrated its 50th anniversary in 2024. In 2025 the organisation has 56 staff members.

== Member organisations ==
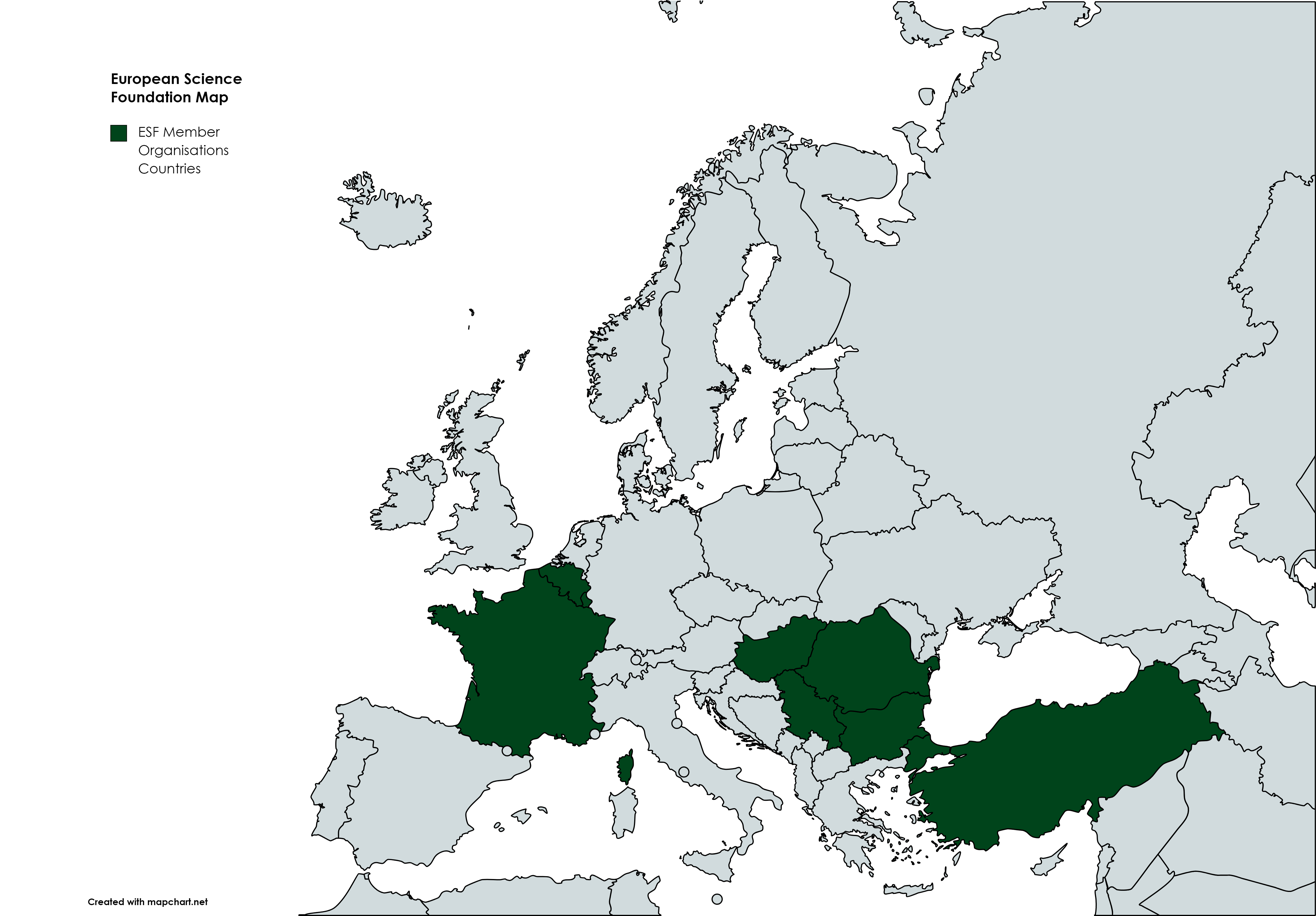
Map of membership of ESF – 10 members from 8 countries: Belgium, Bulgaria, France, Hungary, Luxembourg, Romania, Serbia and Türkiye.

ESF reports ten members from eight countries, including full and associate members. Belgium

- Fonds de la Recherche Scientifique – FNRS (F.R.S.–FNRS) National Fund for Scientific Research
- Association of ERC grantees (AERG)

Bulgaria

- Bulgarian Academy of Sciences Българска академия на науките

France

- Institut Français de Recherche pour l'Exploitation de la Mer
- Core Technologies for Life Sciences (CTLS)

Hungary

- Magyar Tudományos Akadémia Hungarian Academy of Sciences (MTA)

Luxembourg

- Fonds national de la recherche – ofgekierzt FNR (lb)

Romania

- Consiliul Național al Cercetării Științifice

Serbia

- Српска академија наука и уметности

Turkey

- Türkiye Bilimsel ve Teknolojik Arastırma Kurumu

=== Institutional relations ===
Beyond its formal membership, ESF maintains long‑term relationships with a broad range of scientific organisations through its role in hosting and supporting scientific structures and networks (see Activities section). As a result, over 88 national funding organisations, research-performing institutions, universities, research institutes, and space agencies from 49 European and non-European countries actively contribute to ESF activities.

== Governance ==
ESF is an association under French and Local law in Alsace–Moselle. It has been led by the following presidents:

- 1974-1979: Brian_Flowers,_Baron_Flowers
- 1979-1984: Hubert Curien
- 1985-1990: Eugen Seibold
- 1991-1993: Umberto_Colombo_(scientist)
- 1994-1999: Dai_Rees_(biochemist)
- 2000-2005: Reinder van Duinen
- 2006-2011: Ian Halliday
- 2012-2015: Pär Omling
- 2016-2020: Martin Hynes
- 2020-2026: Véronique Halloin

The chief executive officer (CEO) is responsible for day-to-day management. The organisation does not publish details on CEO term limits, appointment procedures, or independent checks and balances beyond statutory auditing.

- 2012–2015 Martin Hynes
- 2004-2007: Bertil Andersson
- 2007: John Marks
- 2008-2011: Marja Makarow
- 2012-2016: Martin Hynes
- 2016–2019: Jean-Claude Worms
- 2019 to date: Nicolas Walter
