= Christopher Margules =

Christopher Robert Margules (AM) is the Leader of the Indo-Pacific Field Division of Conservation International. He is based in Queensland, Australia and has written extensively on the management of biological diversity and biological diversity planning.
