= Venero Armanno =

Australian novelist

- Born: Venero Geraldo Armanno; Brisbane, Queensland, Australia
- Education: University of Queensland (BA); Queensland University of Technology (MA, PhD)
- Occupations: Author and Senior Lecturer in Creative Writing
- Writing career
- Language: English
- Years active: 1991-
- Notable works: The Volcano; Firehead; Candle Life; Black Mountain
- Notable awards: Queensland Premier's Literary Awards, Best Fiction Book, 2002

Venero Armanno is an Australian novelist. He was born in Brisbane of Sicilian parents. He received a BA from the University of Queensland, and later an MA and PhD in Creative Writing from the Queensland University of Technology. Armanno completed ten unpublished manuscripts over fourteen years before being accepted for publication.

He is currently a Senior Lecturer in the School of Communication & Arts at the University of Queensland, where he received the 2004 award for excellence in teaching.

Venero Armanno appeared in 2 events at the 2017 Brisbane Writers Festival in Brisbane, Queensland, Australia.

== Awards ==
- The Australian/Vogel Literary Award (for an unpublished manuscript), 1992: highly commended for The Lonely Hunter
- Warana Writers' Awards, Steele Rudd Award, 1993: runner-up for Jumping at the Moon
- Aurealis Award for Best Horror Novel, 1995: runner-up for My Beautiful Friend
- Queensland Premier's Literary Awards, 1999: nominated for Firehead
- Queensland Premier's Literary Awards, Best Fiction Book, 2002: winner for The Volcano
- Queensland Premier's Literary Awards, Courier Mail People's Choice Award for Best Book of the Year, 2002: shortlisted for The Volcano
- One Book One Brisbane, 2003: shortlisted for The Volcano
- One Book One Brisbane, 2004: shortlisted for Firehead
- Queensland Premier's Literary Awards, Courier Mail People's Choice Award for Best Book of the Year, 2018: shortlisted for Burning Down
- Ditmar Award for Best Novel, 2021: shortlisted for The Crying Forest

== Bibliography ==
=== Novels ===
- The Lonely Hunter (1993)
- Romeo of the Underworld (1994)
- My Beautiful Friend (1995)
- Strange Rain (1996)
- Firehead (1999)
- The Volcano (2001)
- Candle Life (2006)
- The Dirty Beat (2007)
- Black Mountain (2012)
- Burning Down (2017)
- The Crying Forest (2021)

=== Short story collections ===
- Jumping at the Moon (1992)
- Travel Under Any Star (2016)

=== Young adult ===
- The Ghost of Love Street (1997)
- The Ghost of Deadman's Beach (1998)

=== Children's ===
- The Very Super Adventures of Nic and Naomi (2002)
