= ERIH PLUS =

Humanities and social sciences research index

- Producer: Norwegian Directorate for Higher Education and Skills (Norway)
- History: 2014 - present

Coverage
- Disciplines: Humanities and Social Sciences
- Record depth: Bibliographic information
- Format coverage: Academic journals
- Geospatial coverage: Europe

Links
- Website: erihplus.hkdir.no
- Title list(s): kanalregister.hkdir.no/publiseringskanaler/erihplus/periodical/listApproved

ERIH PLUS (originally called the European Reference Index for the Humanities or ERIH) is an index containing bibliographic information on academic journals in the humanities and social sciences (SSH). The index includes all journals that meet the following requirements: "explicit procedures for external peer review; an academic editorial board, with members affiliated with universities or other independent research organizations; a valid ISSN code, confirmed by the international ISSN register; abstracts in English and/or another international language relevant for the field for all published articles; information on author affiliations and addresses; a maximum two thirds of the authors published in the journal from the same institution". ERIH has not been intended for evaluation purposes.

ERIH was originally established by the European Science Foundation and was transferred to the NSD - Norwegian Centre for Research Data in 2014, mainly because it already operated the Norwegian Register for Scientific Journals, Series and Publishers. At the same time, it was extended to also include social science disciplines and renamed ERIH PLUS. The aim of ERIH PLUS is to increase the visibility and availability of SSH. The index goes beyond the commercial indexing services by providing a comprehensive coverage of the scholarly communication and publishing in the fields, enabling researchers to better disseminate their work in national and international languages. As of July 1, 2021, the ownership was transferred to the fresh Norwegian Directorate for Higher Education and Skills.

== Criticism ==
ERIH PLUS has been criticized for "the ease of having the journal included [in it] – semi-automatically, upon a set of criteria which are mostly formal, without taking quality into consideration".
