= Engø =

Peninsula in Sandefjord, Norway

Engø Engøy
- Peninsula
- Location of the peninsula Engø (Norway)
- Coordinates: 59.1469°N 10.3133°E
- Location: Vestfold, Norway
- Offshore water bodies: Tønsbergfjord and Lahellefjord

Engø or Engøy is a peninsula in Sandefjord Municipality in Vestfold county, Norway. It is located between the Tønsbergfjorden and Lahellefjorden, about 5 kilometres (3.1 mi) to the east of the city of Sandefjord. The island of Natholmen lies just to the south of the peninsula. Engøy is located next to Lahelle, northeast of the city.

A ferry operator, known as Jutøya AS, operates a small ferry which connects Engø to the nearby car-free island of Veierland, which is a popular summer tourist attraction. The ferry, known as MF Jutøya, is operated on contract with Vestviken Kollektivtrafikk. The ferry ride to Veierland island takes approximately 10 minutes.

== Name ==
The original name of the island was Engøy, which is a combination of the words eng which means "meadow" and øy which means "island". Former written forms include Ænghøy (in 1398), Enngøenn (1575), Engøen (1644), and later on Engø.
