= Silver Wolf Award (Norwegian Guide and Scout Association) =

Silver Wolf
- Owner: Norwegian Guide and Scout Association
- Awarded for: Outstanding service to Norwegian Guide and Scout Association

The Silver Wolf (Norwegian: Sølvulven) is the highest award made by the Norwegian Guide and Scout Association "for services of the most exceptional character." The award consists of a Silver Wolf suspended from a blue and green neck ribbon. Recipients may wear the corresponding square knot, with a green strand over a blue strand, on their uniform.

The Norwegian Silver Wolf was first awarded by the Norwegian Boy Scout Association in 1915. When the Boy Scout Association and Girl Guide Association merged in 1978, the Silver Wolf Award was discontinued, but in 1998 the merged Norwegian Guide and Scout Association restarted awarding the Silver Wolf.

== Recipients ==
Notable recipients include Ragnvald Iversen, Kaare Amdam, Christian Dons, Hans Møller Gasmann, Robert Baden-Powell, Hubert S. Martin, Birger L. D. Brekke, Odd Hopp, J. S. Wilson, Stein Løvold and Gisle Johnson.

== See also ==
- Bronze Wolf of World Scout Committee
- Silver Wolf of The Scout Association
- Silver Wolf of Scouterna
- Silver Buffalo Award of the Boy Scouts of America
- Silver Fish
