= Hans M. Nordahl =

Norwegian psychologist (born 1961)

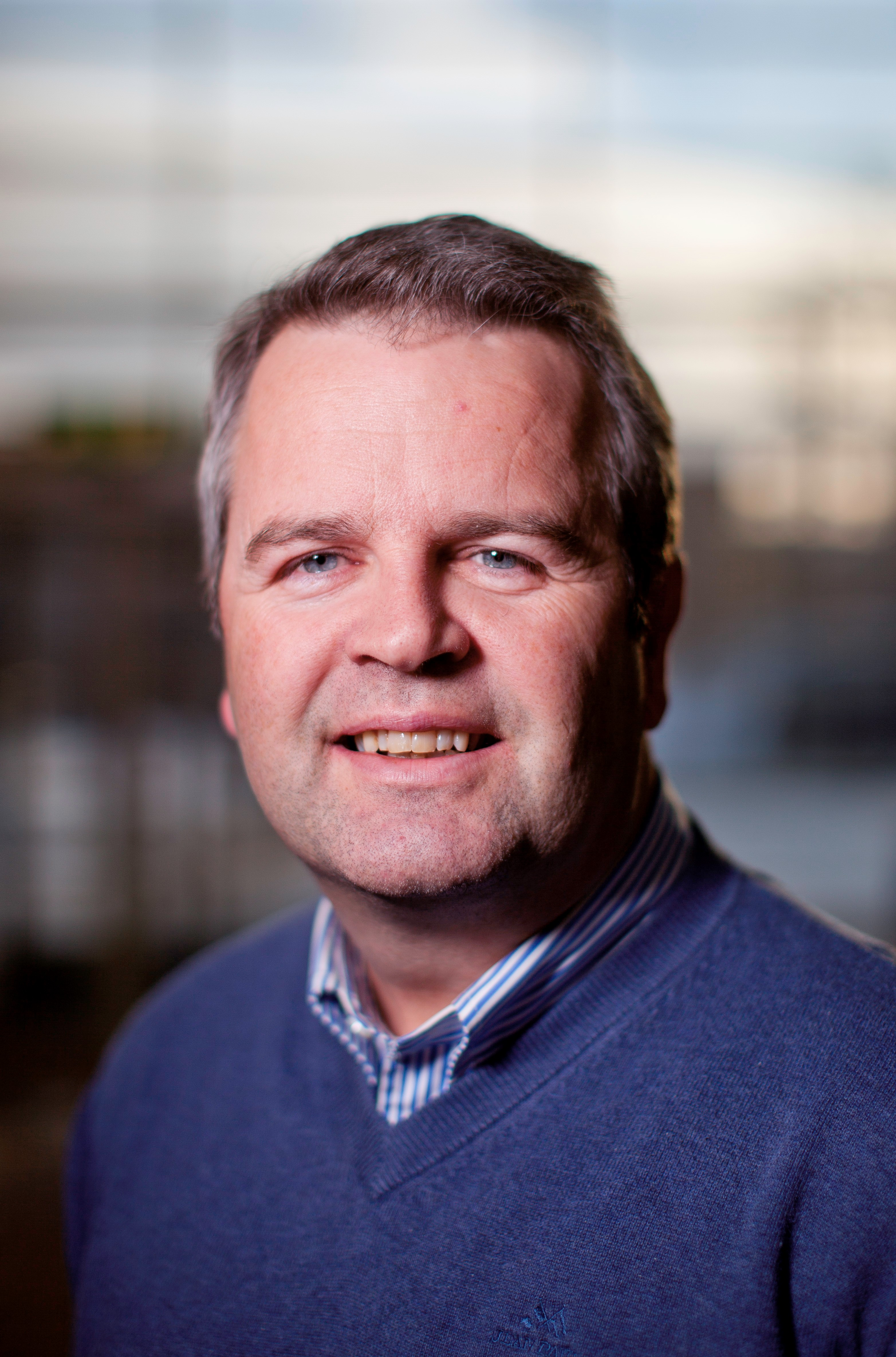

Hans Morten Nordahl (born 1961) Dr.Philos. and professor in clinical psychology and behavioral medicine at the Norwegian University of Science and Technology (NTNU) in Trondheim, Norway.

== Research ==
Prof. Nordahl has contributed to the formation Norwegian Association of Cognitive Therapy (1994) and a former president of the Norwegian Association for CBT (NFKT). He has been a board member of the European Association of Behavioral and Cognitive Therapies (EABCT 1999–2002) and a former board member in the European Society for the Study of Personality Disorders (ESSPD, 2010–2013). In 2007 he founded Metacognitive Therapy Institute with Prof. Adrian Wells. https://mct-institute.co.uk/ From 2010- 2020 he has been the research director of the Trauma Clinic at St. Olav's Hospital, Trondheim. Since 2016 he has been professor of medicine (Behavioral Sciences in Medicine) at the Institute of Mental Health, NTNU.

== Publications ==
Prof. Nordahl has been extensively involved in the training and supervision of therapists both nationally and internationally and has also published several articles and book chapters during the last two decades.

He has been elected member of the Royal Norwegian Society of Sciences and Letters since 2007.

Selected publications:

- Nordahl, HM, Vogel, PA., Morken, G., Stiles, T., Sandvik, P., & Wells, A. (2016). Paroxetine, Cognitive therapy or their combination in the treatment of Social Anxiety Disorder with and without avoidant personality disorder: A randomized clinical trial. Psychotherapy and Psychosomatics, 85, 346–356.
- Nordahl HM, Borkovec TD, Hagen R, Kennair LEO, Hjemdal O, Solem S, Hansen B, Haseth S & Wells A. (2018). Metacognitive Therapy versus Cognitive Behaviour Therapy in adults with Generalized Anxiety Disorder: A Randomised Controlled Trial. British Journal of Psychiatry(open access), 4, 393–400. DOI: 10.1192/bjo2018.54
