= Løvold =

Løvold is a surname. Notable people with the surname include:

- Ansgar Løvold (1888–1961), Norwegian wrestler and philanthropist
- Halvor Løvold (1875–??), Norwegian naval officer
- Stein Løvold (1944–2015), Norwegian Chief Scout of the Norwegian Scout association
- Thomas Løvold (born 1981), Norwegian curler
- Lars Løvold (born 1951), Norwegian environmental activist, social anthropologist and founder of Rainforest Foundation Norway
