= Bente Gunnveig Berg =

Norwegian neuroscientist

Bente Gunnveig Berg (born 20 February 1954) is a Norwegian neuroscientist and Professor of Neuroscience at the Department of Psychology at the Norwegian University of Science and Technology (NTNU). Her research seeks to understand how the brain processes olfactory information, including how signals are encoded in a functional neural network. She is a member of the Royal Norwegian Society of Sciences and Letters.
