= Hans Møller Gasmann =

Norwegian educator

- Born: 28 January 1872; Oslo
- Died: 6 December 1961 (aged 89)
- Occupation: Educator
- Known for: Starting scouting i Norway, promoter of association football

Pastor Hans Møller Gasmann (28 January 1872 – 6 December 1961) was a Norwegian educator from Oslo, promoter of association football and one of Norway's first Scout leaders, who founded the Second Christiania Scout Troop at Frogner in Oslo in 1910. In spring 1911, he met with Christian Dons, who had started the First Christiania Scout Troop. They founded the Norwegian Guide and Scout Association (Norwegian: Norsk Speidergutt-Forbund).

The history of Vålerenga Fotball goes back to Fotballpartiet Spark, which he founded in May 1903. An early mission for Gasmann was to give the local youth social activity and exercise. On a larger scale, the club was part of the movement known as Muscular Christianity.

In 1917, he was awarded the third Silver Wolf, the highest commendation of Norwegian Scouting.

Hans Møller Gasmanns vei in Oslo is named in his honor.
