= Nico Norman =

Norwegian physicist

Nicolai "Nico" Norman (17 April 1919 – 2 July 2006) was a Norwegian physicist.

He was born in Trondhjem as a son of a postal clerk. He finished his secondary education in 1938, and having also attended mercantile school, he graduated with the cand.real. degree from the University of Oslo in 1947. He became a research assistant, then research fellow and took the dr.philos. degree in 1956.

He was employed by the Sentralinstitutt for industriell forskning before being appointed as professor of condensed matter physics at the University of Oslo in 1964. He was inducted into the Norwegian Academy of Science and Letters in 1966 and the Royal Norwegian Society of Sciences and Letters in 1968.

He retired in 1986, but frequented the University of Oslo as a professor emeritus almost up until his death in July 2006, aged 87.
