= Nattholmen =

Island in Vestfold, Norway

Nattholmen Natholmen
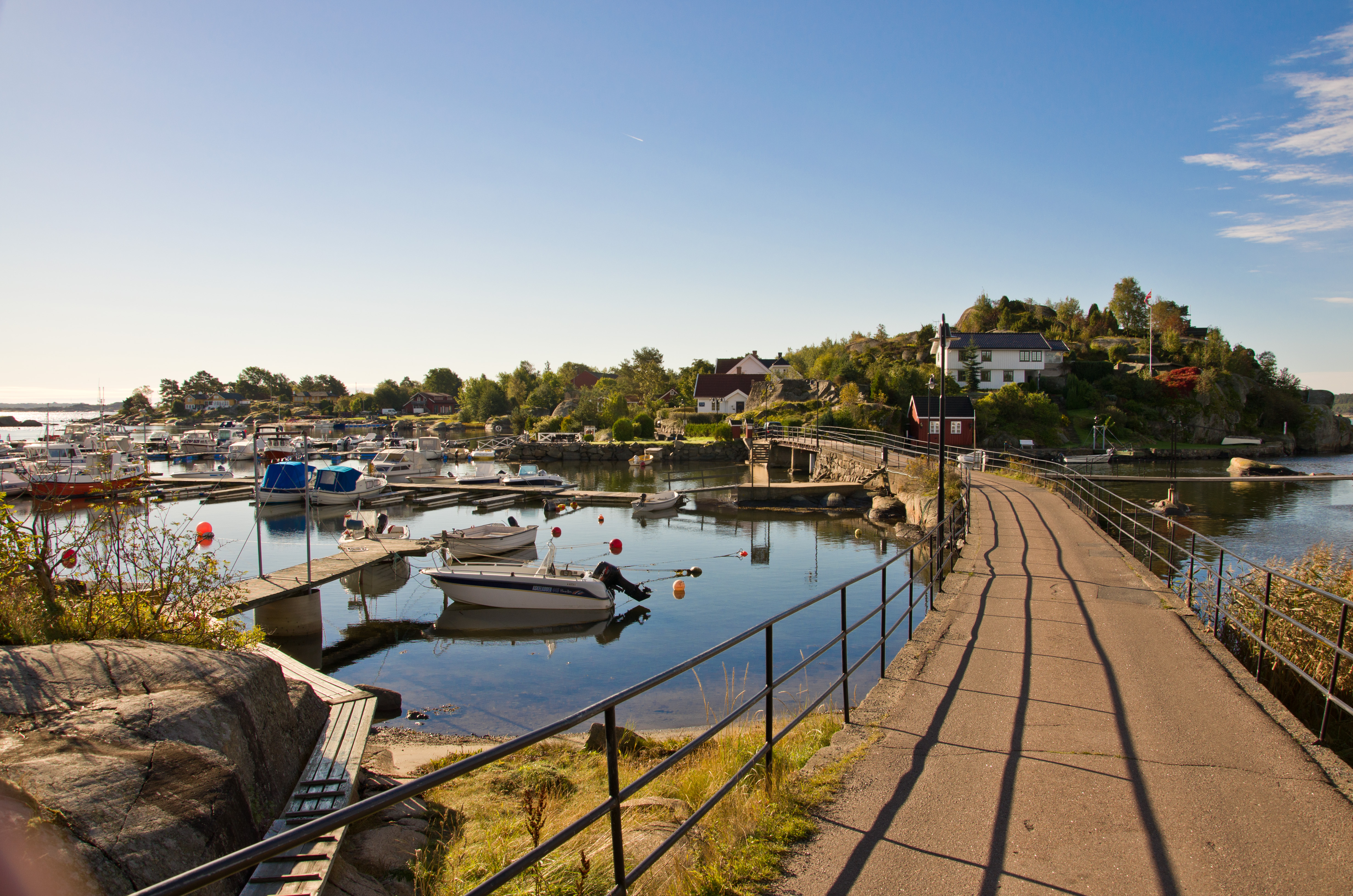
- Bridge to Natholmen
- Interactive map of the island

Geography
- Location: Vestfold, Norway
- Coordinates: 59.12373°N 10.32267°E
- Area: 0.22 km^{2} (0.085 sq mi)
- Length: 0.9 km (0.56 mi)
- Width: 0.4 km (0.25 mi)

Administration
- Norway
- County: Vestfold
- Municipality: Sandefjord Municipality

Nattholmen is an island in Sandefjord Municipality in Vestfold county, Norway. The island is located in the Tønsbergfjorden at the entrance to the Lahellefjorden. The 0.22-square-kilometre (22 ha; 54-acre) island is situated about 5 kilometres (3.1 mi) to the east of the town of Sandefjord. The island was only accessible by boat until a bridge was installed in 1920 connecting the island to the mainland. The inhabited island is the home to Knattholmen Campground (Knattholmen leirsted), which is the oldest campground in Norway.

On 12 August 1923 the YWCA-YMCA (Norwegian: KFUK-KFUM) established the campground on the island. The campground is called Knattholmen, which may have been the original name given to the island.

The island was the largest island in Sandefjord Municipality prior to the 2017 merger with Andebu Municipality and Stokke Municipality. It is 900 metres (3,000 ft) long from north to south, and 400 metres (1,300 ft) wide at its widest from east to west. It is located between the Lahellefjord and the Tønsbergfjord. It is 6 kilometres (3.7 mi) east of the centre of the city of Sandefjord, and immediately south of the Årø peninsula.

The island is a gated community that is connected to the mainland by a private bridge. However, there is a parking lot by the gate, which can be accessed by pedestrians. There is also a public bus route to the island (route 163). Attractions on the island include Sandbukta ("sand bay"), which is a beach on its eastern side. It is also a common destination for recreational activities such as camping, paddling, sea trout fishing, hiking, and sailing. It has surrounding views of the Tønsbergfjord and the nearby Stauper islands. A former customs station on the island, known as Blåsen, has also become a landmark. The island hosts annual summer camps for the Queer Youth Festival and the YWCA-YMCA Guides and Scouts of Norway.

== Etymology ==
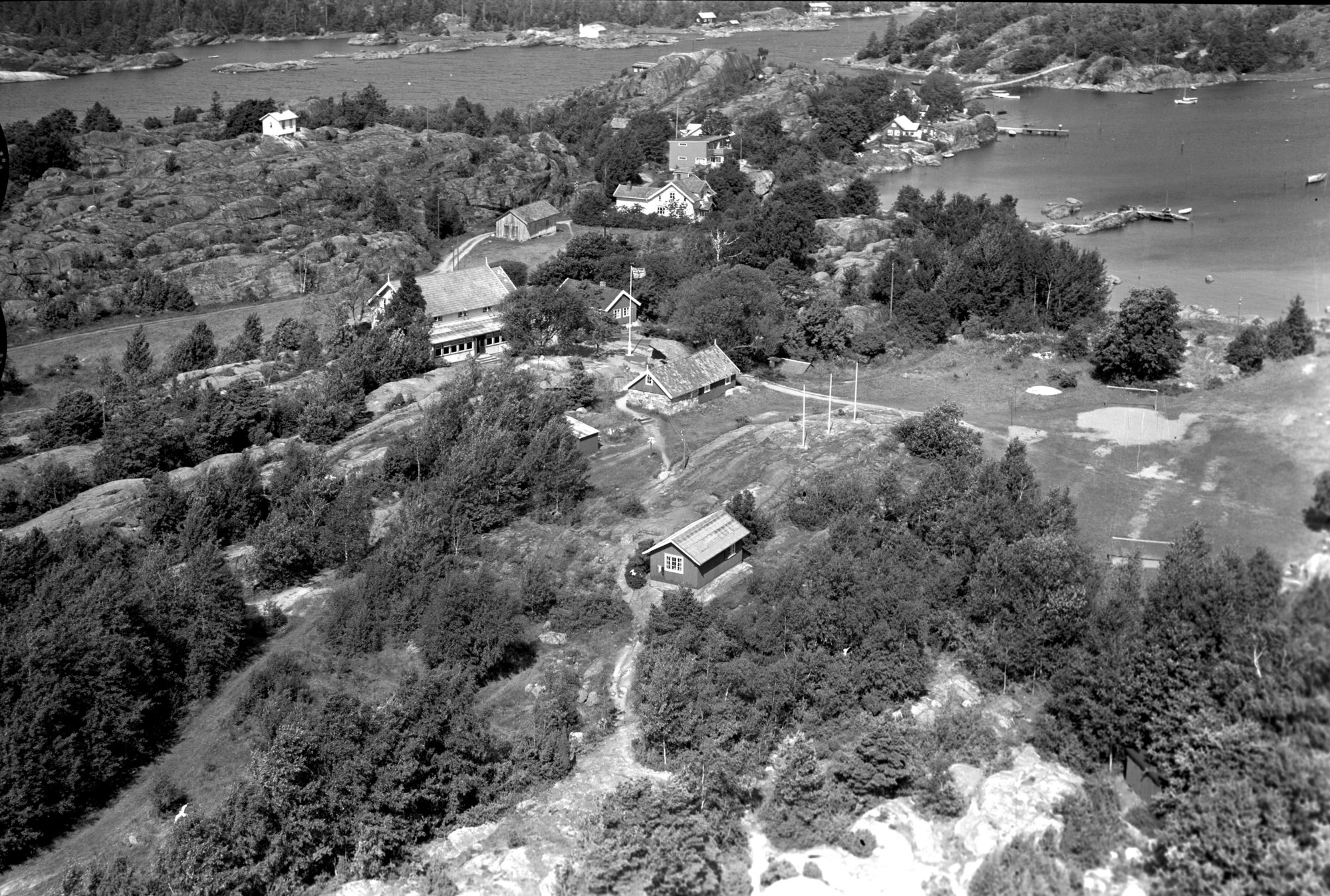
Natholmen in 1947.

The name Natholmen ("night islet") derives from the older days when the island was used overnight for local fishermen. One theory of the name’s origin is that fishermen stayed here overnight, hence the island was named nattholmen or "night islet". This theory is however unlikely to be true. Another theory is that the word “Nat” derives from nate (soak, wet).

The island was named "Hnatholmanom" in written sources from 1398, while the oldest written form of the name was Knattholminn, which derives from "knottr", meaning rock ("fjellknatte") and "holmi", which means islet. In words beginning with 'kn', the pronunciation of the letter k often disappears. In 1723, the island was named Knattholminn.

Since 1977, Natholmen has also been the name of the road that connects the island to the mainland. Natholmen is also the name of a 100-square-metre (1,100 sq ft) artificial lake on the island, which was formerly used as a reservoir.

== History ==
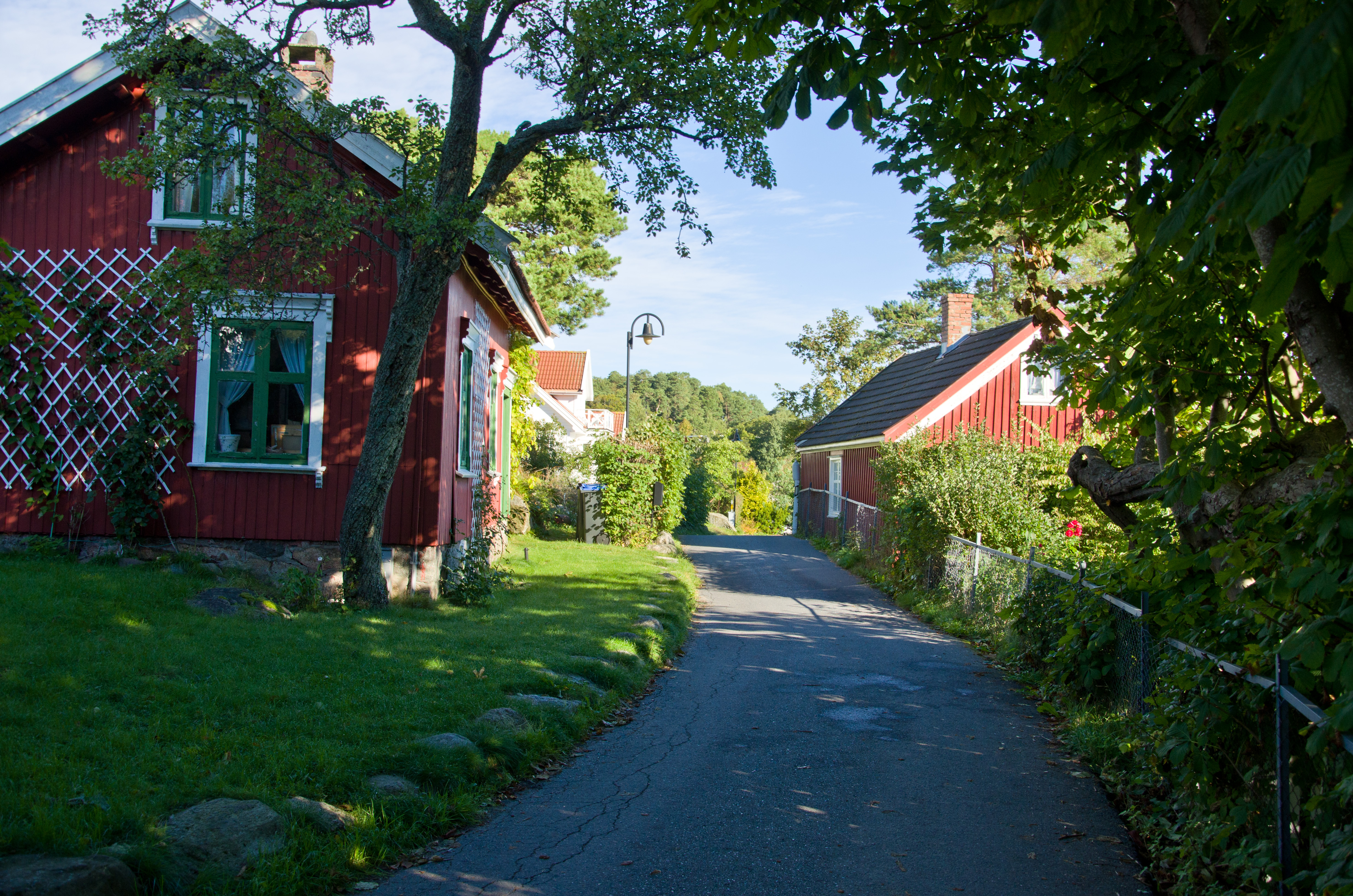
Main road at Natholmen.

The island was often visited by foreigners, particularly Dutch, who purchased lumber in the 1600s. Until World War II, there were four or five families living on the island. In the early 1600s, the island was a loading site for Dutch ships that arrived to purchase lumber. In 1758, Rasmus Hanssøn, the great grandfather of Christen Christensen, moved to the island.

The scouting organization YWCA-YMCA Guides and Scouts of Norway (Norwegian: KFUK-KFUM) utilized a cabin owned by the Norwegian Boy Scout Organization for their first summer camp in 1916. This cabin was located by the Mefjorden and was the beginning of an annual camping tradition for the YWCA-YMCA. In 1921, the board established a committee to find and suggest an appropriate permanent campground. On 18 May 1923 the board met on Natholmen Island after hearing of a farm for sale on the island. The organization purchased the farm and opened the campground "Knattholmen Leirsted & Kystleirskole" in August of the same year.

The first bridge to the mainland was built in the early 1920s when an inhabitant on the island had purchased a Ford Model T. The original lumber bridge was replaced by a stone bridge in 1928.

== See also ==
- List of islands of Norway
