= Stein Løvold =

Norwegian Scouting leader

Chief Scout of the Norwegian Scout association
- In office 1992–1996

Stein Løvold (April 17, 1944 – September 1, 2015) served as the Chief Scout of the Norwegian Scout association, Norges Speiderforbund from 1992 to 1996, and was elected to serve from 1996 to 2002 on the World Scout Committee at the 34th World Scout Conference held from 8 to 12 July 1996 at the Folkets Hus Congress Centre, in Oslo, Norway.

Løvold was the 86th recipient of the Silver Wolf, Norway's highest Scout award, in 1998.
