= Kristian Fossheim =

Norwegian physicist (born 1935)

Kristian Johan Fossheim (born 4 December 1935) is a Norwegian physicist.

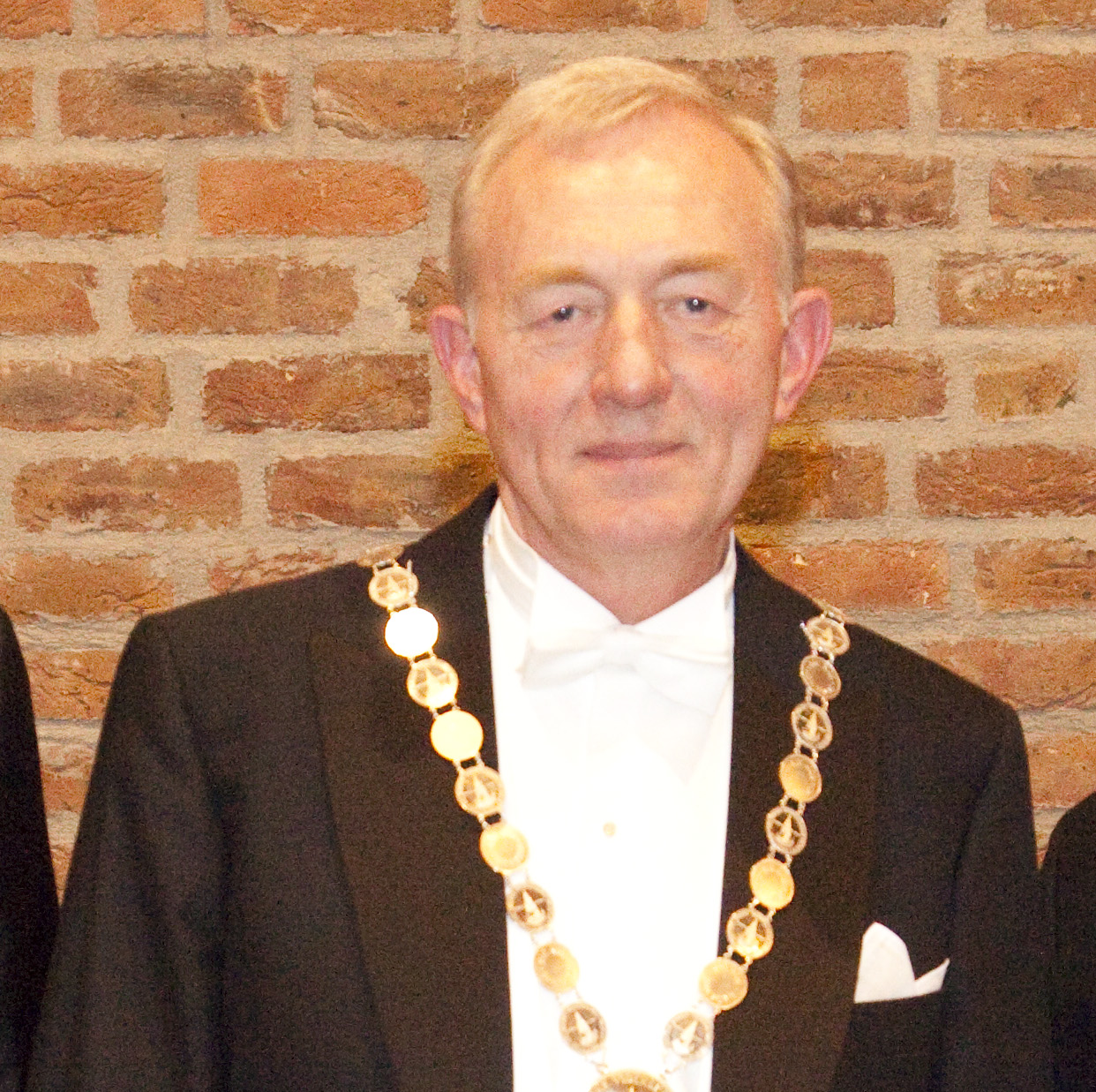
Kristian Johan Fossheim

He was born in Jølster Municipality. He took the dr.philos. degree in 1972, was an associate professor at the Norwegian Institute of Technology from 1970 to 1980, and professor from 1980. He has been vice-praeses of the Royal Norwegian Society of Sciences and Letters, and is a member of the Norwegian Academy of Science and Letters and the Norwegian Academy of Technological Sciences.
