= The Guides and Scouts of Norway =

National Scouting and Guiding federation of Norway

Speiderne i Norge
- Former name (2003-2022): Speidernes fellesorganisasjon (Spf)
- Country: Norway
- Founded: 2003
- Membership: 32,000
- Landssjef: Anne Sjømæling
- Viselandssjef: Thorbjørn Geirbo
- Affiliation: World Association of Girl Guides and Girl Scouts, World Organization of the Scout Movement
- Website http://www.scout.no/

The Guides and Scouts of Norway (Norwegian: Speiderne i Norge) is the national Scouting and Guiding federation of Norway, founded in 2003 as "Speidernes Fellesorganisasjon". It took over the WOSM membership of Norges Speiderforbund and the WAGGGS membership of the Fellesrådet for speiderpiker i Norge. Speidernes Fellesorganisasjon serves 17,348 Scouts (as of 2011) and 14,443 Guides (as of 2008).

The federation has actual two independent member associations:

- Norges Speiderforbund (Norwegian Guide and Scout Association)
- Norges KFUK-KFUM-speidere (YWCA-YMCA Guides and Scouts of Norway)

== National jamborees ==
The federation host its first joint National Jamboree, landsleir, in July 2025, in Gjøvik.
