= Lisa Lorentzen =

Norwegian mathematician

Lisa Lorentzen (born 1943, also published as Lisa Jacobsen) is a Norwegian mathematician known for her work on continued fractions. She is a professor emerita in the Department of Mathematical Sciences at the Norwegian University of Science and Technology (NTNU).

== Books ==
With Haakon Waadeland, Lorentzen is the author of the book Continued Fractions with Applications (Studies in Computational Mathematics 3, North-Holland, 1992; 2nd ed., Atlantis Studies in Mathematics for Engineering and Science, Springer, 2008).

She is also the author of two textbooks in Norwegian: Kalkulus for ingeniører [Calculus for engineers] and Hva er matematikk [What is mathematics?], and co-author with Arne Hole and Tom Louis Lindstrøm of Kalkulus med én og flere variable [Calculus with single and multiple variables].

== Recognition ==
Lorentzen is a member of the Royal Norwegian Society of Sciences and Letters. She was the 1986 winner of the academic prize of the Royal Norwegian Society of Sciences and Letters.
