= Niels Schultz =

Norwegian politician

Niels Stockfleth Schultz
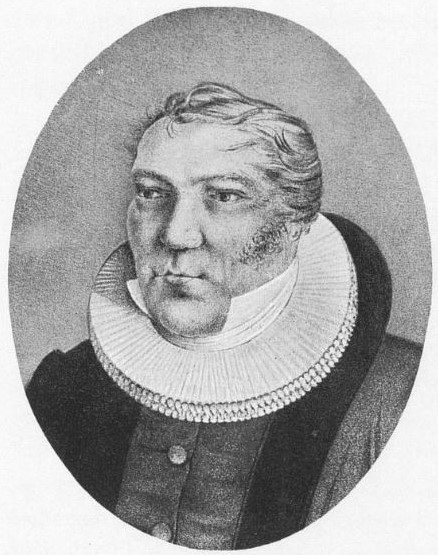

Personal details
- Born: 14 March 1780 Krødsherad, Norway
- Died: 30 May 1832 (aged 52) Oslo, Norway
- Denomination: Lutheran
- Parents: Ole Schultz; Anne Kirstine Stockfleth
- Spouse: Anne Louise Frederikke Rohleder (1782–1870)
- Occupation: Priest
- Education: University of Copenhagen

Niels Stockfleth Schultz (14 March 1780 – 30 May 1832) was a Norwegian cleric, author and politician.

== Biography ==
Niels Stockfleth Schultz was born in Krødsherad in Buskerud and grew up in nearby Sigdal. His father, Ole Schultz (1737–97) was a parish priest. His mother, Anne Kirstine Stockfleth, died when he was five years old and his father when he was 17. He was a pupil at the Cathedral School in Christiania, (now Oslo). He came to the attention of Niels Treschow who arranged for Marcus Gjøe Rosenkrantz to pay for his education. He graduated in theology at University of Copenhagen during 1802. In 1807 he published a textbook on the English language and later an English grammar. He also wrote a Danish-Norwegian language text and a Biblical text. In 1809, he was appointed resident chaplain at Vår Frue Church in Trondheim, an office he held until his death.

Schultz was first elected to represent Trondhjem at the Norwegian Constituent Assembly at Eidsvoll in 1814. He continued to attend parliamentary assemblies (except in 1821) until 1830. In 1827, he served as President of the Parliament. Schultz was a member of Royal Norwegian Society of Sciences and Letters from 1811, serving as secretary from 1813-1815; Praeses from 1829–1832.

== Selected works ==
- Praktisk Engelsk Sproglære, 1807
- Prædikener, 1823
- Engelsk Grammatik, 1826
- Kortfattet Norsk Sproglære, 1826

Academic offices
Preceded by Christian Krohg	Praeses of the Royal Norwegian Society of Sciences and Letters; 1829–1832	Succeeded by Frederich Christopher Trampe
