= Birger Brekke =

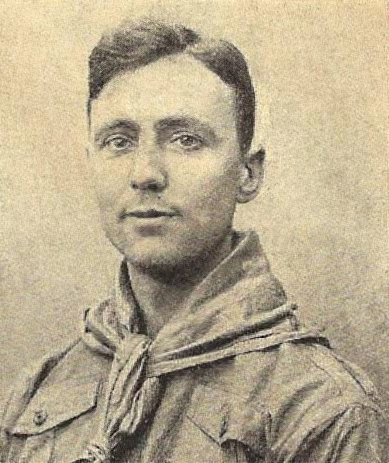
- Born: May 3, 1891
- Died: April 15, 1981 (aged 89)
- Occupation: Scout leader
- Known for: Chief Scout of the Norsk Speidergutt-Forbund

Pastor Birger L. D. Brekke (3 May 1891 – 15 April 1981) was a Norwegian Scout leader, and served as the Chief Scout of the Norsk Speidergutt-Forbund from 1945 to 1956.

Brekke was the 20th recipient of the Silver Wolf, Norway's highest Scout award, in 1949.
