= Ragnvald Iversen =

- Born: January 18, 1882; Tromsø
- Died: August 21, 1960 (aged 78); Trondheim
- Education: Kongsbakken Upper Secondary School
- Spouse: Clara Grace Brodersen
- Children: 2
- Awards: His Majesty the King's Gold Medal, Fridtjof Nansen Prize for Outstanding Research, Gunnerus Medal
- Scientific career
- Fields: North Germanic linguistics
- Institutions: Norwegian College of Teaching
- Thesis: Bokmål og talemål i Norge 1560–1630 (1921)

Ragnvald Iversen (January 18, 1882 – August 21, 1960) was a Norwegian educator and professor of North Germanic linguistics.

Iversen was born in Tromsø. After passing his examen artium in 1899 at the Kongsbakken Upper Secondary School, he moved to Oslo, where he worked as a teacher (among other places, at Brandbu Middle School from 1907 to 1909) while studying. He received his university degree in 1910 with a thesis titled Senjen-maalet. Lydverket i hoveddrag (The Senja Dialect: Phonology and Main Features, published 1913), after which he taught in Arendal from 1910 to 1913. In 1913 he became a teacher at Hønefoss Middle School, where he met his first wife Clara Brodersen, who had worked there as a teacher since 1911. Iversen worked at Hønefoss until 1920, with a stay abroad in Copenhagen from 1913 to 1914, and he won His Majesty the King's Gold Medal in 1917 for his thesis Syntaksen i Tromsø bymål (Syntax of the Tromsø Urban Dialect). In 1918 he went on partial leave to pursue a university scholarship that enabled him to receive his PhD in 1921 with the dissertation Bokmål og talemål i Norge 1560–1630 (Standard Language and Dialects in Norway from 1560 to 1630).

In 1922 Iversen became a professor at the newly established Norwegian College of Teaching in Trondheim (where he was appointed chancellor in 1936), and the same year he was elected to the Norwegian Academy of Science and Letters. He became president of Royal Norwegian Society of Sciences and Letters in 1932. Together with Halvdan Koht (also from Tromsø), Johan Bojer, Gustav Natvig-Pedersen, Arne Bergsgård, and Martin Birkeland, in 1934 Iversen was appointed to a committee whose recommendations led to the 1938 orthographic reform and the common language variety known as Samnorsk.

Iversen retired in 1952 and also received the Fridtjof Nansen Prize for Outstanding Research the same year. In 1957 he received the Gunnerus Medal. At Uppsala University, he became a member of the Royal Gustavus Adolphus Academy in 1933, a member of the Upsala Linguistics Society in 1952, and a member of the Royal Society of Humanities at Uppsala in 1959, and he received an honorary doctorate from the university in 1954. He was also a recipient of the Swedish Order of the Polar Star. Iversen also held the position of Deputy Chief Scout from 1920 to 1945, for which he received the Silver Wolf award in 1924 and the King's Medal of Merit in Gold in 1936, as well as the Order of St. Olav (knight and commander).

Iversen married Clara Grace Brodersen (1878–1921) in 1915 while they were both teachers at Hønefoss. He remarried in 1932 to Torborg Tjernström (1909–2001), with whom he had a son (Gudmund, born 1932) and a daughter (Reidun, born 1937). Iversen died in Trondheim.
