= Stauper =

Archipelago in Vestfold, Norway

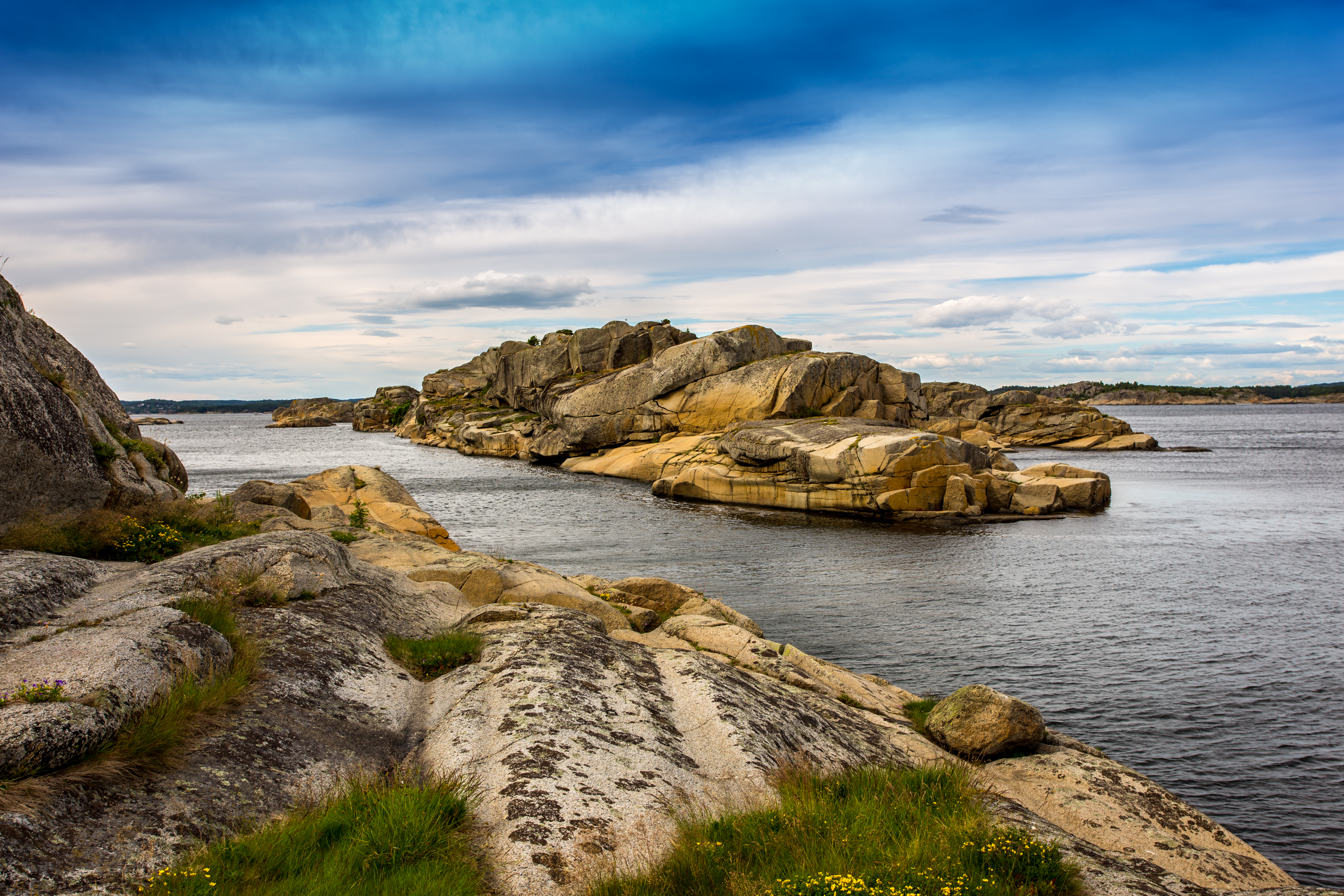
- Interactive map of the island

Geography
- Location: Vestfold, Norway
- Coordinates: 59.09658°N 10.33571°E
- Total islands: 21
- Major islands: 4
- Area: 17 ha (42 acres)

Administration
- Norway
- County: Vestfold
- Municipality: Sandefjord Municipality

Stauper is an archipelago in Sandefjord Municipality in Vestfold County, Norway. The islands are located in the Tønsbergfjorden, about 2 kilometres (1.2 mi) south of the island of Natholmen. It consists of 170 decares (17 ha; 42 acres) of rocky islands, islets, and skerries. The uninhabited islands are only accessible by boat. Stauper consists of 21 islands, including the larger islands of Betjenterholmen (0.03 square kilometres or 7.4 acres), Terneskjær, Teholmen, Stauperkollen, Kistholmen, Langholmen, Ærholmen, Stauperluva, Lyngholmen, Torgerskjær, and Helgerødskjær. They are located in-between the Østerøya peninsula in Sandefjord Municipality and Tjøme in Færder Municipality.

The islands have deep bays, long straits, cliff formations, and round rocks and skerries. Naturally occurring island plants include European red raspberry, Wild pansy, Sea thrift, and Yellow toadflax. Several cabins were previously located on the island of Betjenterholmen. Despite its location in-between Flautangen (Østerøya) and Lindholmen (Tjøme) in the Tønsbergfjord, the archipelago belongs to Sandefjord Municipality.

It is particularly popular during the summer months for recreational activities, including swimming, sunbathing, kayaking, diving, boating, fishing, and camping. Public toilets and trash cans have been installed on the islands. However, the islands have no piers or established campground facilities. The islands are popular for boaters during summer. While there are no sandy beaches on the islands, they are used for jumping, diving, and snorkeling. Since 2012, Pernille Sjølett Hansen has held annual concerts on the islands.

== Media gallery ==
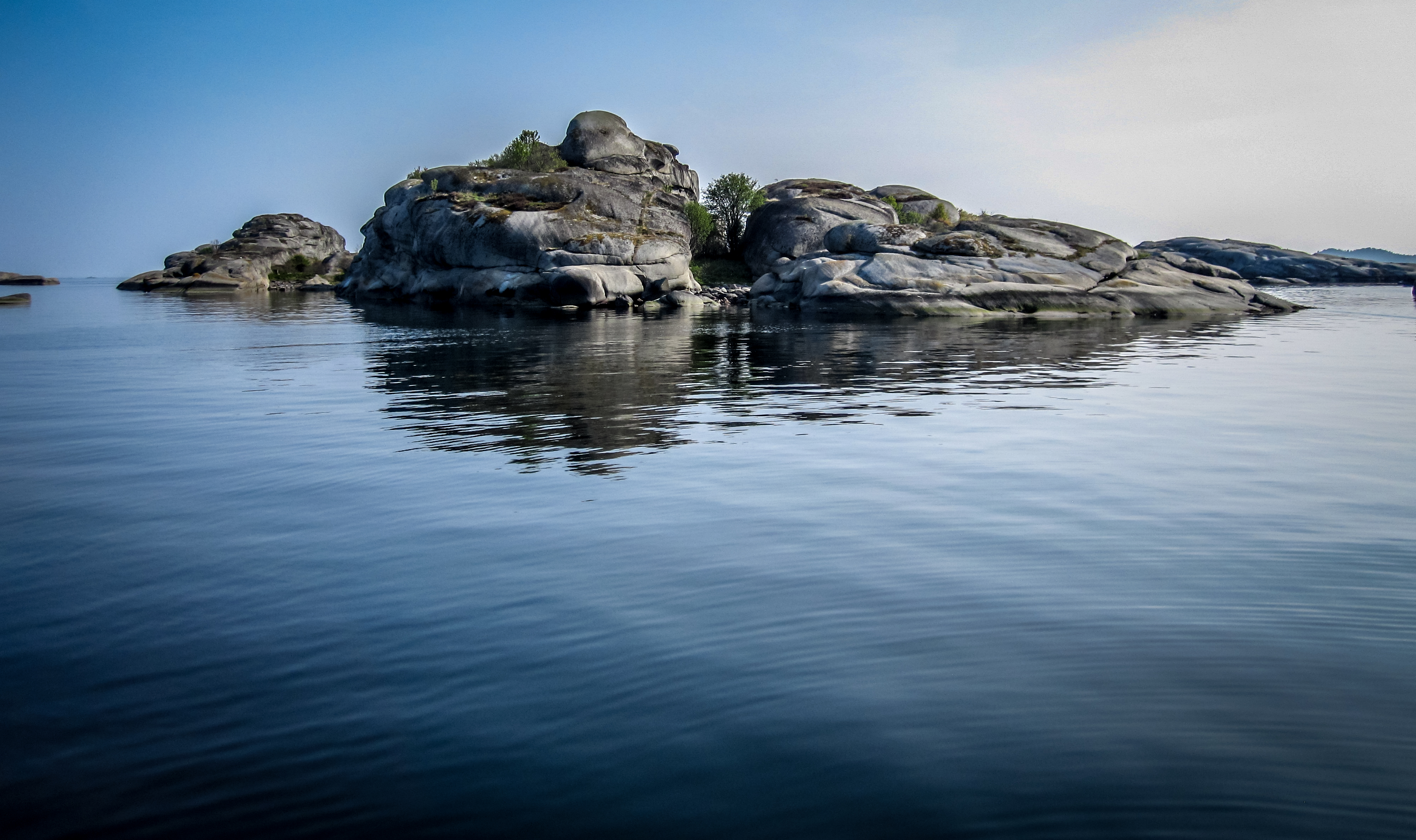

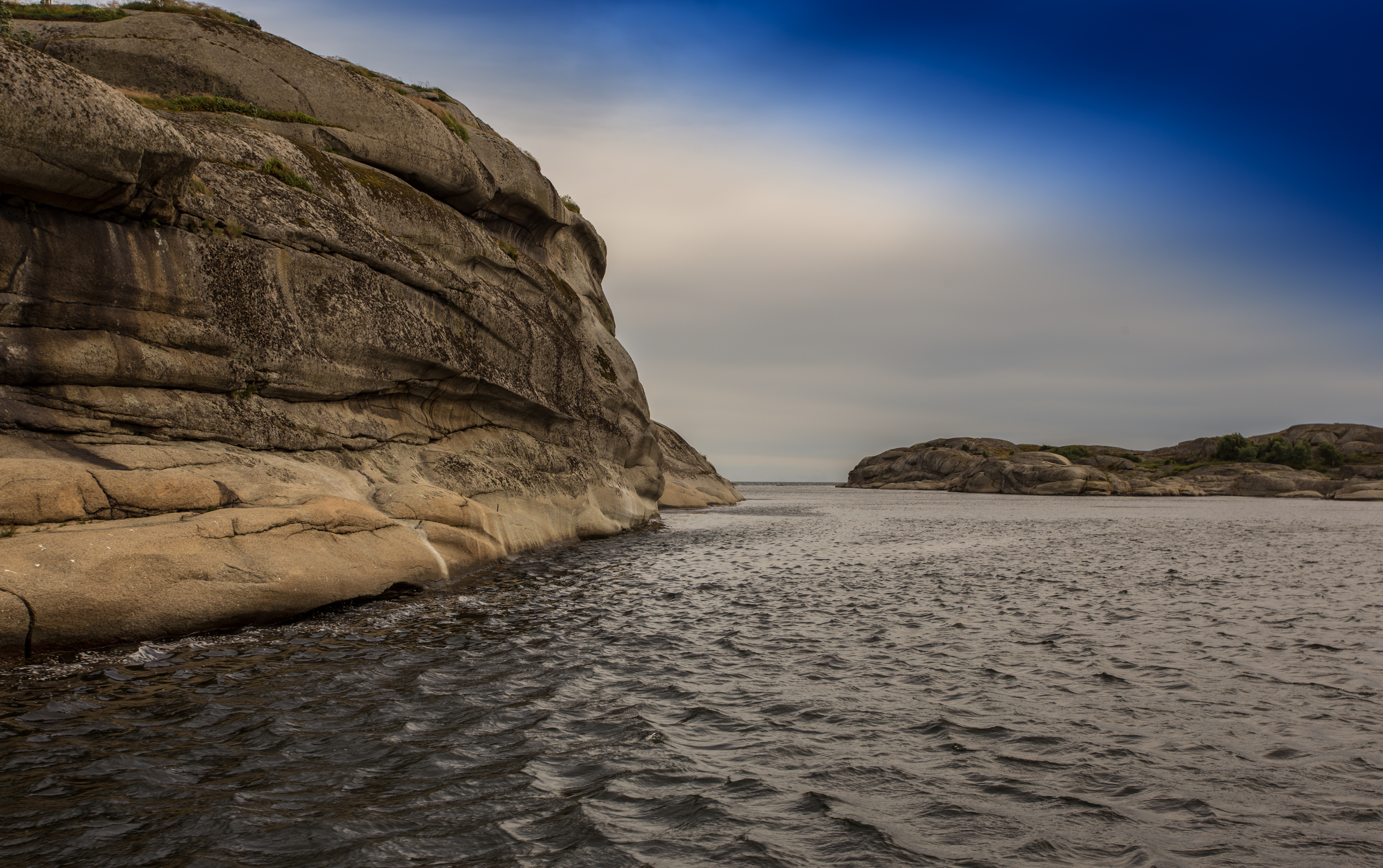

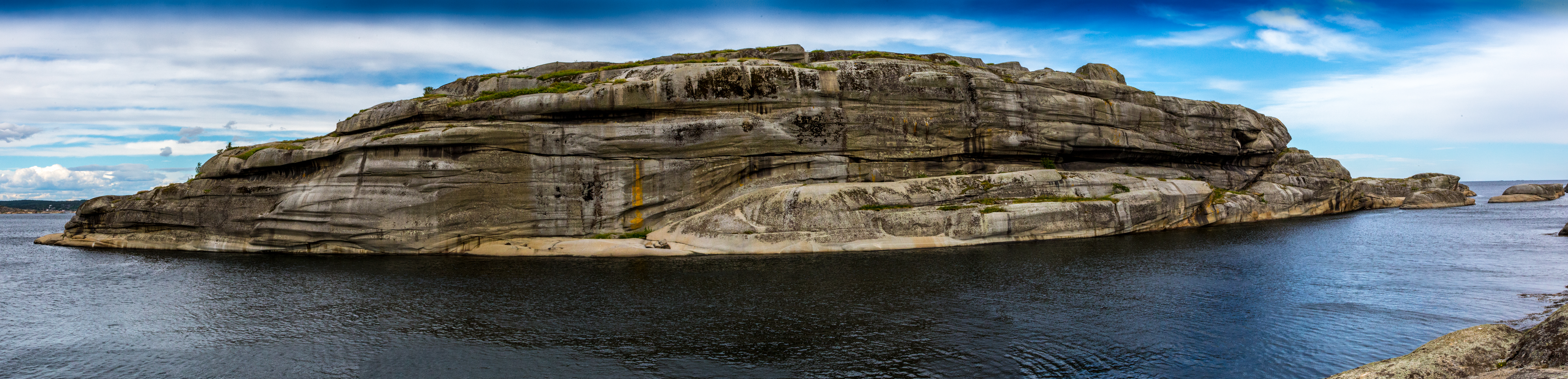

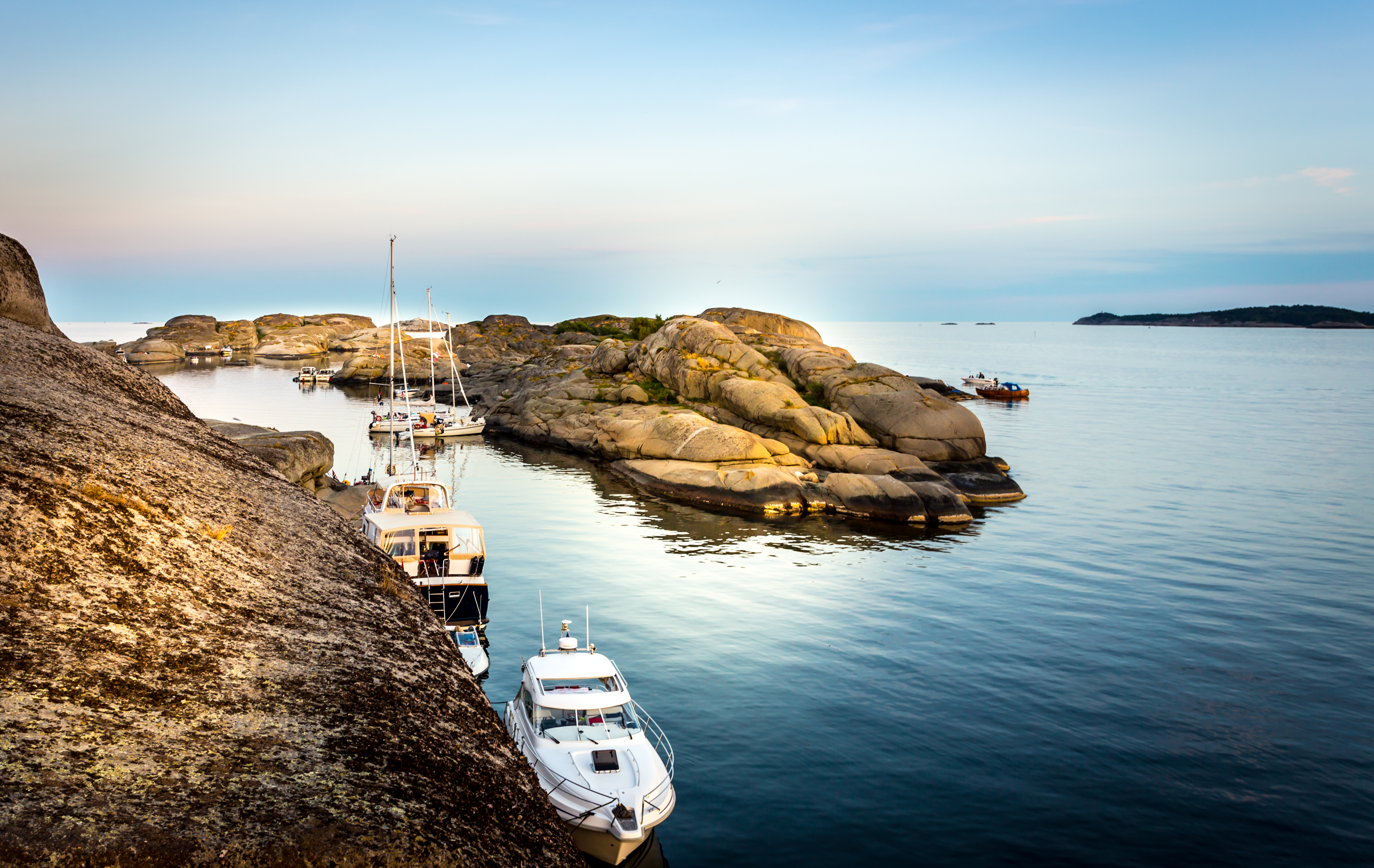

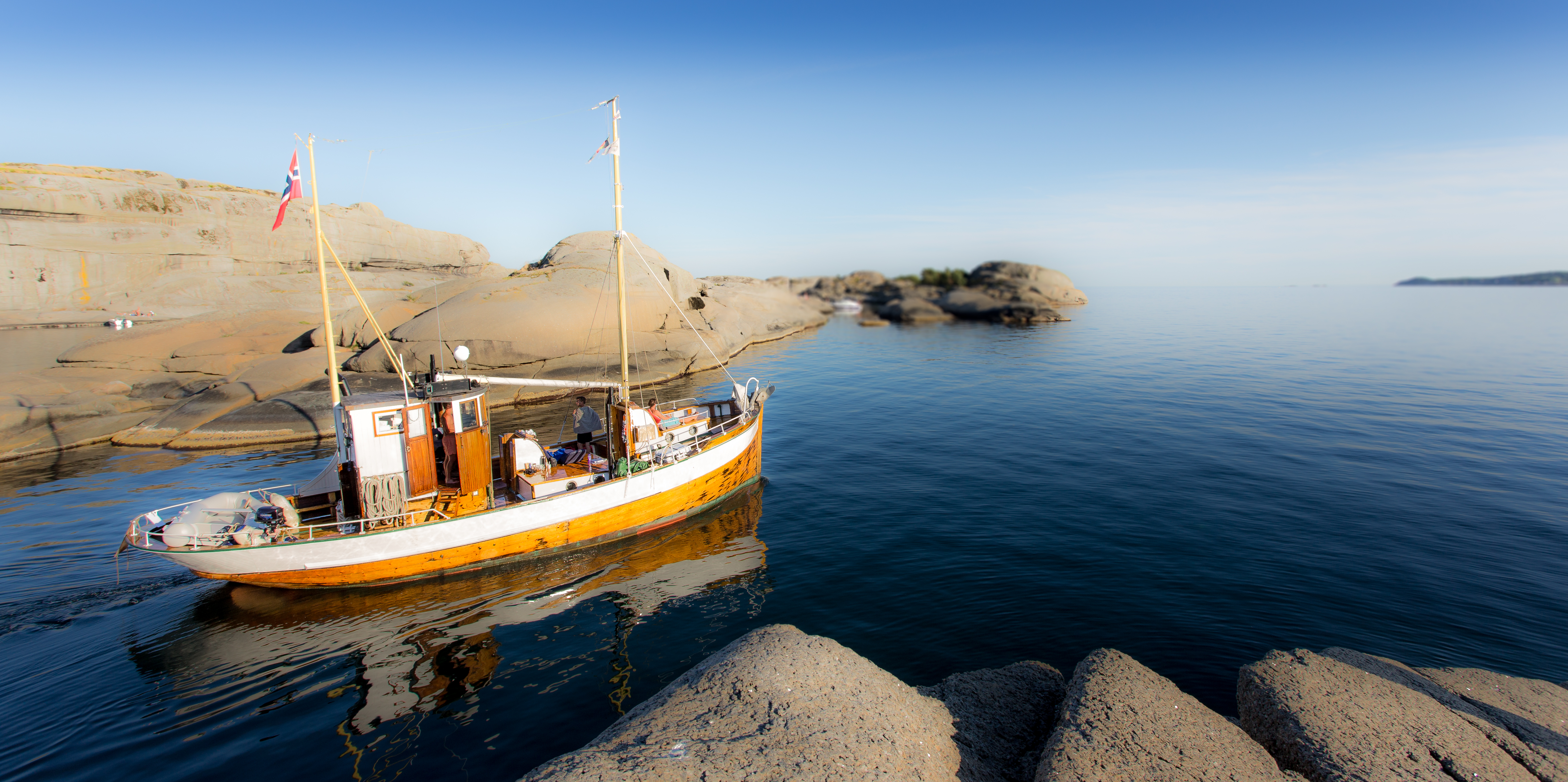

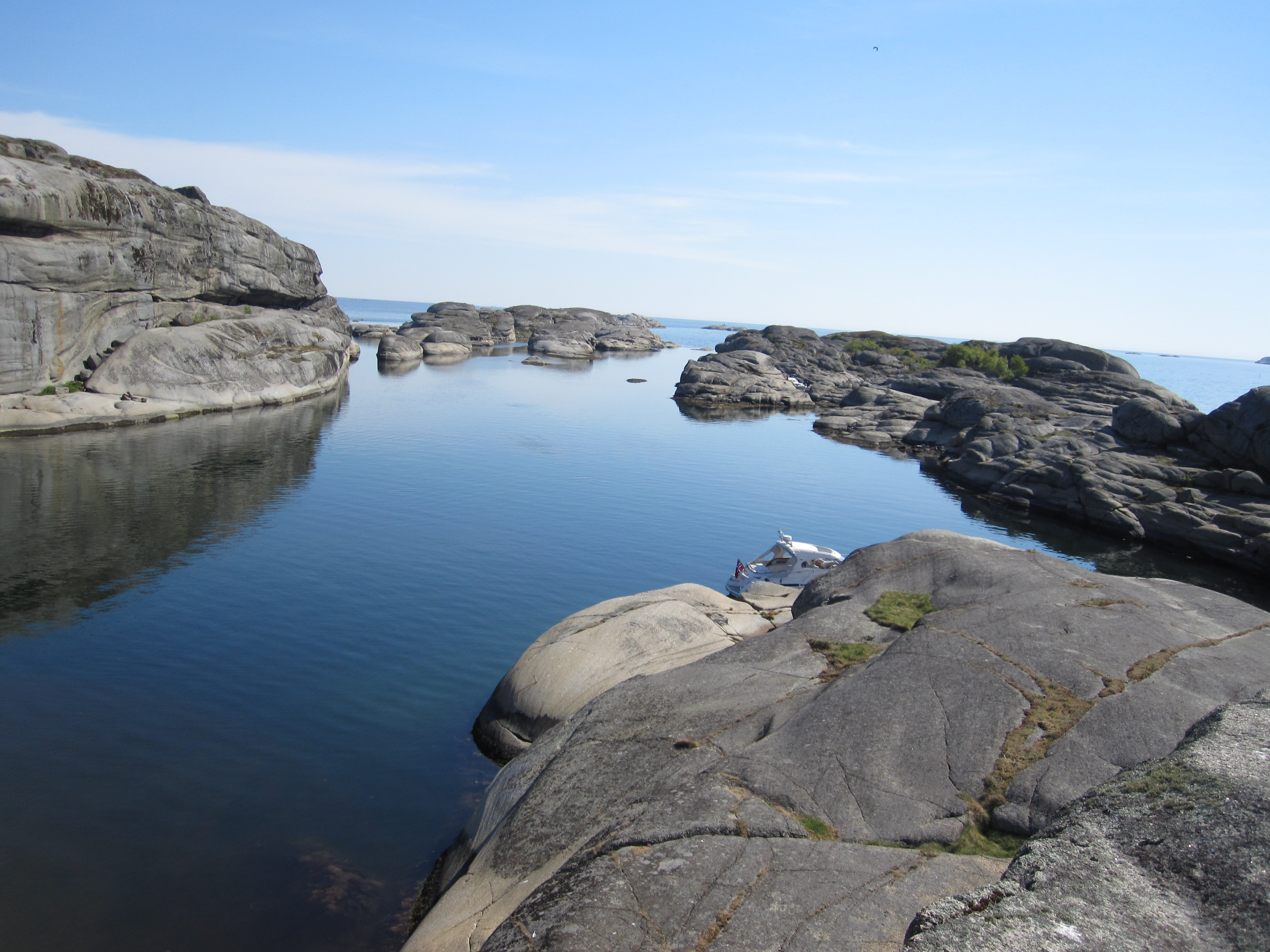
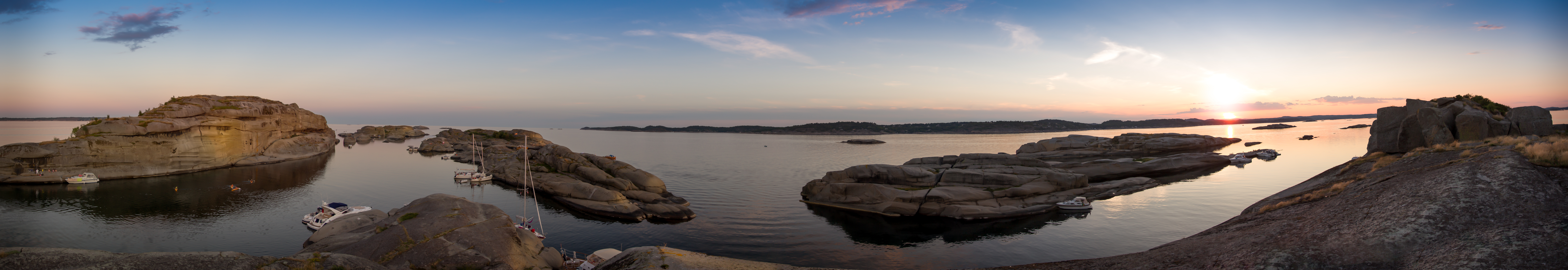
View of the islands

== See also ==
- List of islands of Norway
