= Jutøya =

Norwegian passenger ferry company

Jutøya AS is a passenger ferry company that operates services between Tenvik on Nøtterøy island in Færder Municipality, Engø in Sandefjord Municipality, and the island of Veierland in Færder Municipality. The company was founded in 2000 and operates the ferry MF Jutøya on contract with Vestviken Kollektivtrafikk.
