= Christian Krohg (government minister) =

Norwegian politician (1777–1828)

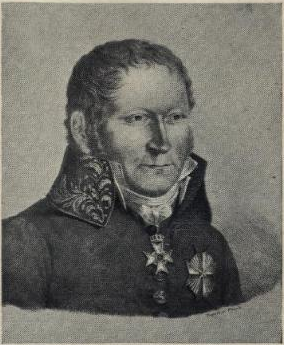
Christian Krohg by Jacob Munch

Christian Krohg (15 January 1777 – 10 November 1828) was a Norwegian lawyer and politician. He is mostly remembered for his activity in the years following the passing of the constitution of Norway in 1814. Krohg was the head of the recently established parliament's constitutional committee in 1824 when it rebuked attempts by the king of Sweden-Norway to expand the king's constitutional powers, for which he was widely celebrated among the public. After his death, a memorial to Christian Krohg was inaugurated in Oslo on the 17th of May, 1833 with an accompanying speech by Henrik Wergeland. The Krohg memorial would remain a focal point of Constitution Day celebrations until the 1860s. He was the grandfather of Christian Krohg, the painter.

In addition to serving as a member of parliament representing Trøndelag, during which time he was sometimes president of parliament, Krohg served in a number of government roles. From 1814, he was councillor of state without ministry in 1814, member of the Council of State Division in Stockholm 1815–1816, Minister of the Interior and Minister of Finance in 1816, Minister of Education and Church Affairs 1816–1817, head of Ministry of the Police in 1817, Minister of Education and Church Affairs and Minister of Justice in 1817, Minister of Justice 1817–1818, as well as head of Ministry of the Police again in 1818, and councillor of state without ministry in 1818.

Krohg also served as praeses of the Royal Norwegian Society of Sciences and Letters from 1820 to his death.

Academic offices
Preceded by Peter Olivarius Bugge	Praeses of the Royal Norwegian Society of Sciences and Letters; 1820–1828	Succeeded by Niels Stockfleth Schultz
