= Simen Ådnøy Ellingsen =

Norwegian Professor

Simen Andreas Ådnøy Ellingsen
- Born: May 14, 1981 (age 44)
- Occupation: Professor at the Norwegian University of Science and Technology

Simen Andreas Ådnøy Ellingsen (born 14 May 1981) is a Norwegian engineering physicist specializing in fluid mechanics, especially waves, turbulence, and quantum mechanics. He is a full professor at the Norwegian University of Science and Technology, at the Department of Energy and Process Engineering. He is known for having expanded Lord Kelvin's work known as Kelvinangle. He received the Royal Norwegian Society of Sciences and Letters Prize for Young Researchers in the Natural Sciences in 2011 and became a member of the Young Academy of Norway in 2019. He received a European Research Council Consolidator Grant in 2022.

He plays several instruments and has published music with the band Shamblemaths.

== Education ==
Ellingsen has two doctoral degrees. The first from 2009 is Nuclear Terrorism and Rational Choice from King's College London. The second from 2011 is Dispersion forces in Micromechanics: Casimir and Casimir-Polder forces affected by geometry and non-zero temperature from the Norwegian University of Science and Technology.

== Publications (selection) ==
- List of publications by Simen Ådnøy Ellingsen in BIBSYS (Norway)
- List of publications by Simen Ådnøy Ellingsen in CRIStin (The Norwegian Scientific Index)

== Membership and honours ==
In 2011 he was the winner of the Royal Norwegian Society of Sciences and Letters Prize for Young Researchers in the Natural Sciences.

Ellingsen became one of 12 new members of the Young Academy of Norway in 2019, and is member of the Royal Norwegian Society of Sciences and Letters.
