= Veierland =

Island in Vestfold, Norway

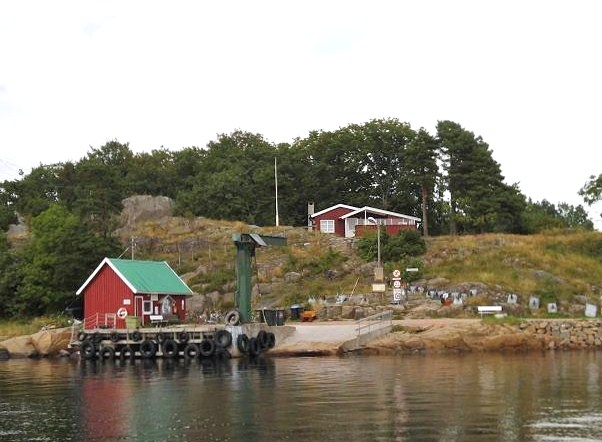
- Ferry harbour at Veierland Island
- Interactive map of the island

Geography
- Location: Vestfold, Norway
- Coordinates: 59.14858°N 10.33719°E
- Area: 4.4 km^{2} (1.7 sq mi)
- Coastline: 17 km (10.6 mi)
- Highest elevation: 56 m (184 ft)
- Highest point: Brentås

Administration
- Norway
- County: Vestfold
- Municipality: Færder Municipality

Demographics
- Population: 150

Veierland is a populated, car-free island in Færder Municipality in Vestfold county, Norway. The 4.4-square-kilometre (1.7 sq mi) island is located in the Tønsbergfjorden, between the mainland (to the west), the island of Tjøme (to the east), and the island of Nøtterøy (to the northeast). Veierland Church was established in 1905. Historically, there was a Veierland School; however, this closed in 2013. Veierland is primarily a summer vacation community. The island has a 17-kilometre (11 mi) shoreline with many popular swimming beaches including Kjølholmen, Hverveodden, and Kongshavn. Places for accommodation and eateries are open during the summer months.

Veierland has been inhabited as long as Vestfold county. The island has a permanent year-round population of about 150 people; however, the island experiences significant summer tourism. Over 450 vacation homes can be found on the island. The island has no bridge or road connections. Veierland is connected to the mainland by 9-17 daily ferries from Tenvik on the island of Nøtterøy via the Jutøya AS. During the summer months there are also ferries from Engø peninsula in Sandefjord Municipality.

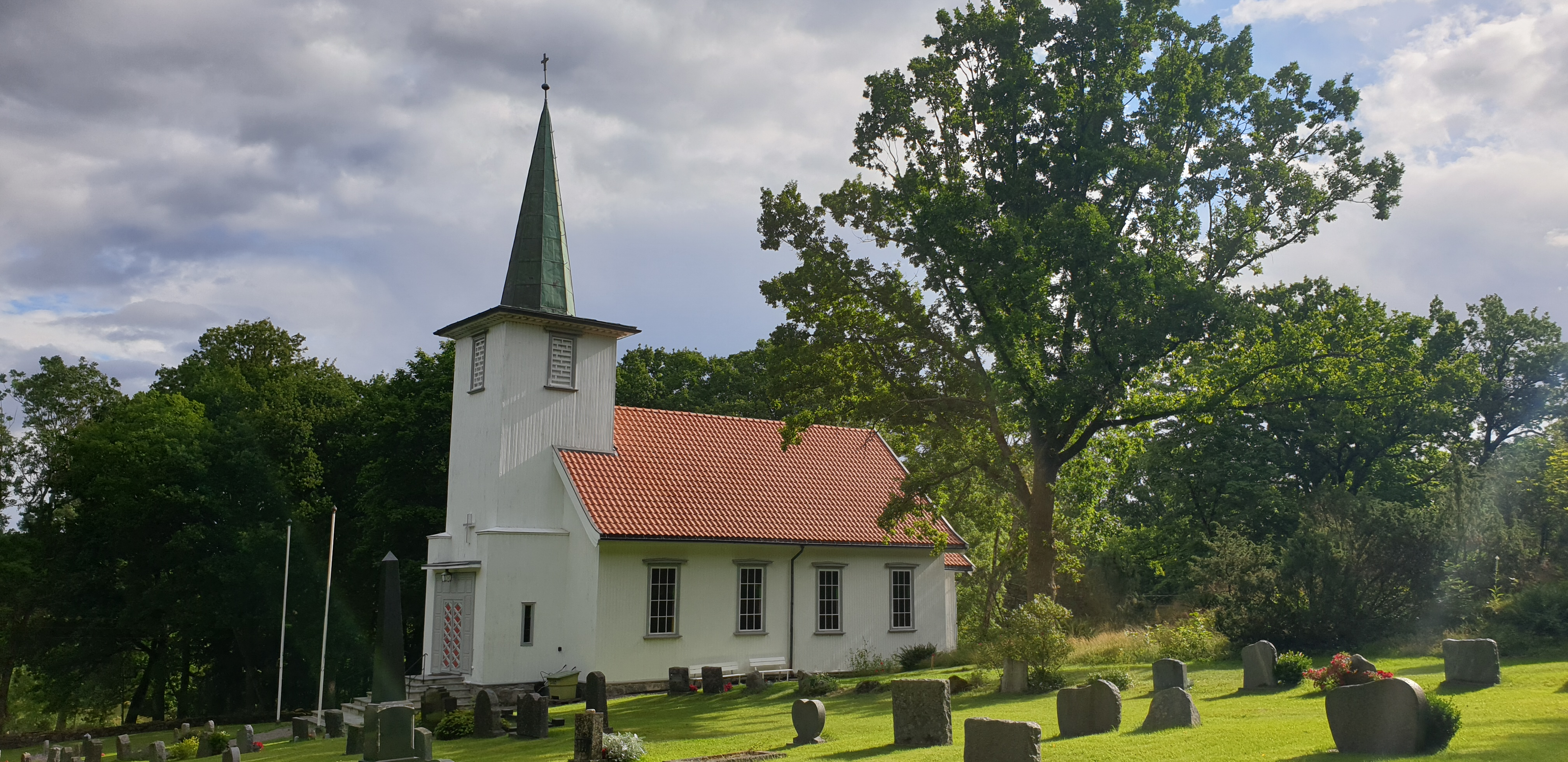
Veierland Church was erected in 1905.

Convenience stores, a golf course, and restaurants are operated on the island during summers, although most services are closed outside the tourist season. The island is primarily car-free, but residents may acquire permits for vehicles such as tractors, golf carts, mopeds, and ATVs. Besides its boat harbors, beaches, and cabin communities, the island remains densely forested with much agricultural activity.

== Name ==
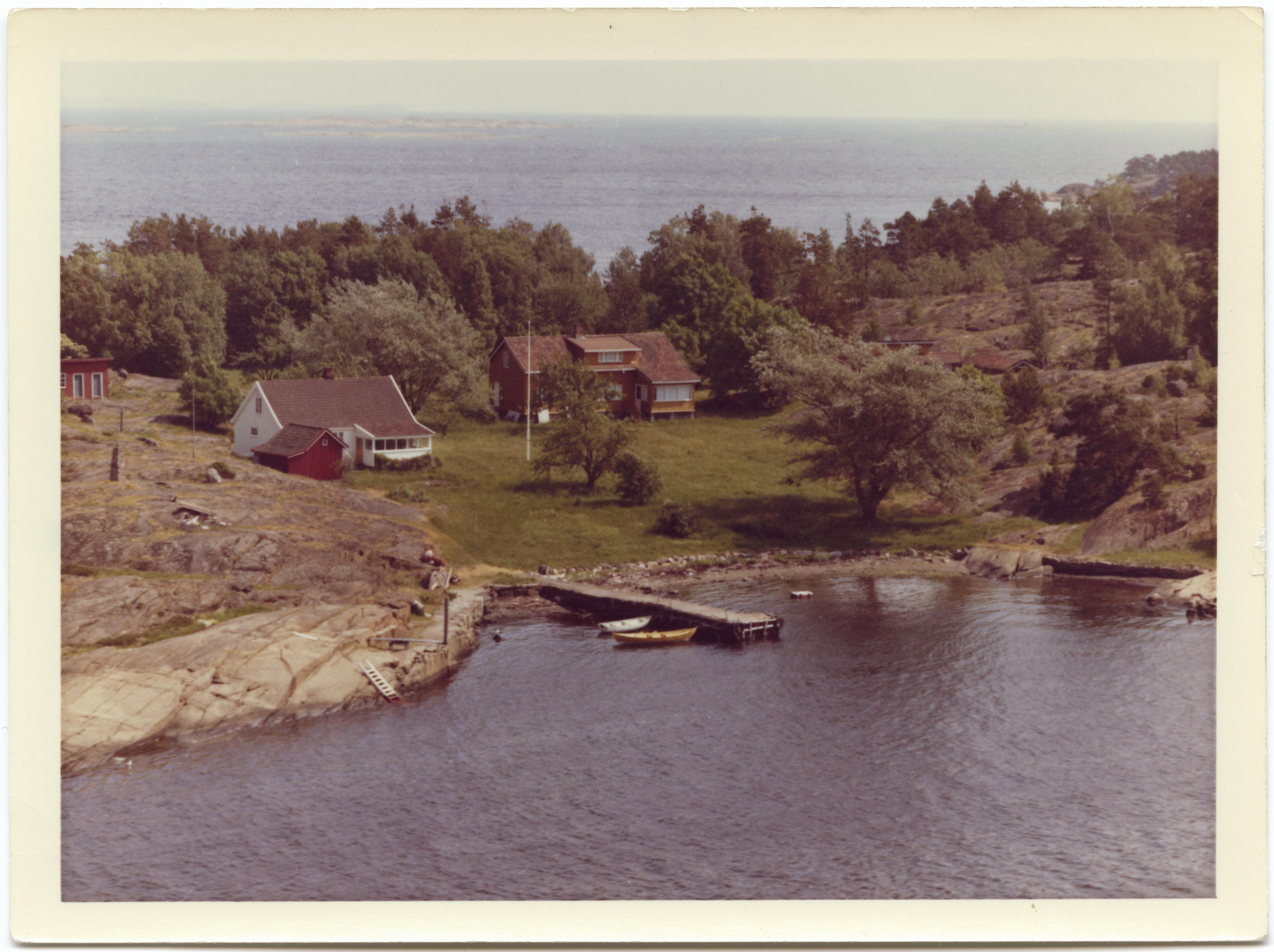
Kjølholmen on northernmost Veierland.

The island is named Veierland (Old Norse: Vájir). The first element is the plural form of vá which means "inlet". The last element is land which means "land".

== Demographics ==
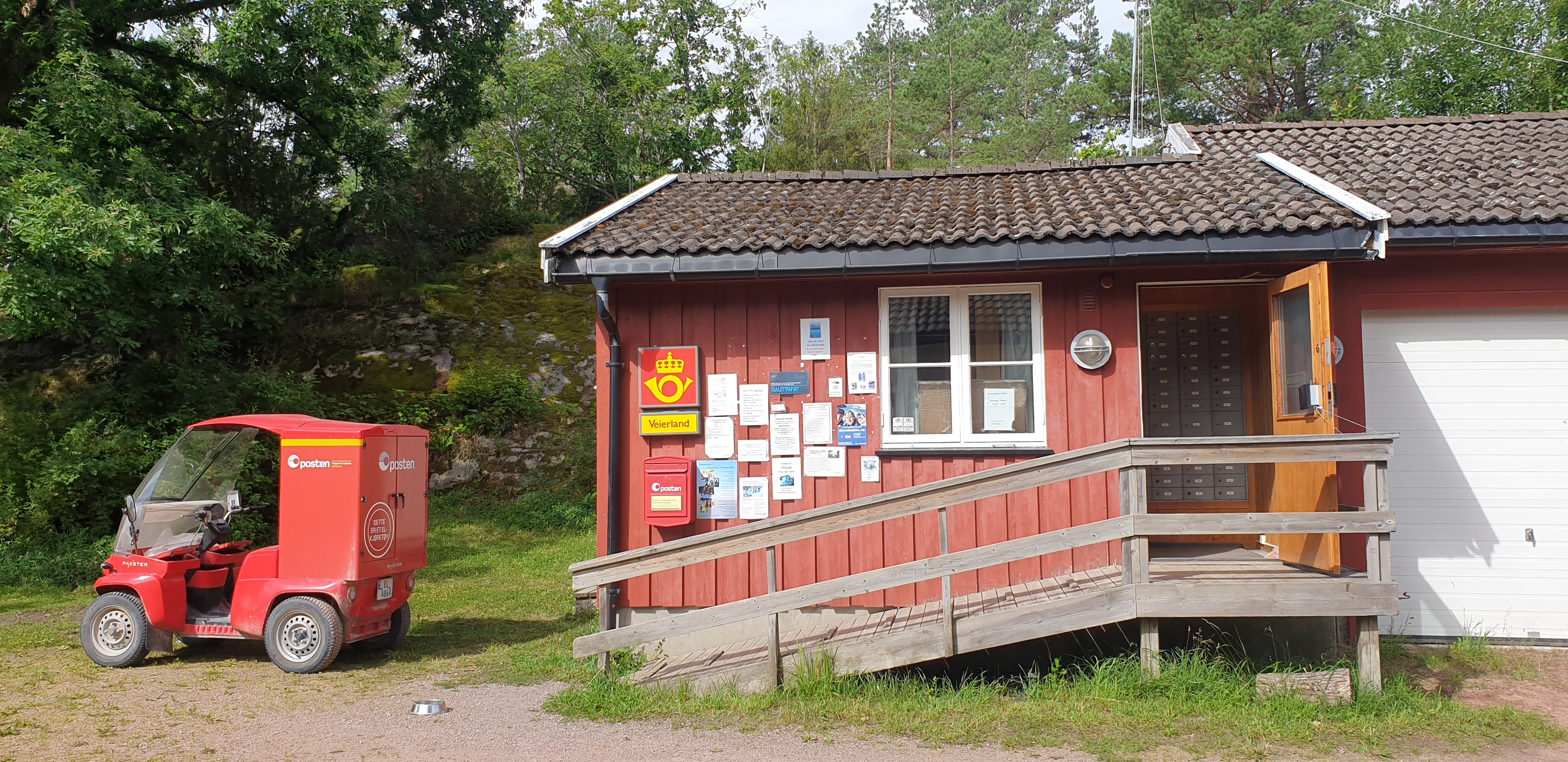
The post office on Veierland Island.

The island was populated by between 300-400 people in the early 1900s, but the population later decreased to under 100. As of 2012, the island has a population of 150 permanent residents but the population more than doubles during summers when many of the island’s 450 vacation homes are utilized. It is a current goal of the municipality to increase the island’s year-round population to 300.

Veierland has experienced a population decline in recent years, and the population decreased by 12 percent from 2012 to 2017. While the island had a permanent population of 158 in 2012, the population was 111 as of 2017. The school on the island was shut down in 2013 and the library closed in 2014. Several residents argued for the island to be transferred into Sandefjord Municipality following the 2017 municipal reform. The island had a policy requiring residents to live on the island (Norwegian: boplikt) from 1998-2012. Half of the homes sold on the island since 2012 are now used as vacation homes.

== Notable people ==
Author Jens Bjørneboe purchased a home on Veierland from singer-songwriter Ole Paus and lived on the island until his death on 9 May 1976. Ole Paus has written a song entitled “Veierland” (on the album “Stjerner i rennesteinen”) about the island, while author Karin Bang has written three novels in which the island goes by the name Jutøy. Artist Edvard Munch spent the summer of 1887 on the island, and painted numerous works while visiting on Veierland.

== Wildlife ==
Veierland is known for its high population of deer. During 2001, 78 deer were hunted on the island.

== See also ==
- List of islands of Norway
