= Gisle Johnson (Scouting) =

Chief Scout of the Norges Speiderforbund
- In office 1982–1986

Dr. Gisle Johnson (January 18, 1934 – November 19, 2014) was Chief Scout of the Norges Speiderforbund from 1982 to 1986, and served on the European Scout Committee from 1977 to 1983, as the Chairman the last three years.

In 1985, Johnson was awarded the 178th Bronze Wolf, the only distinction of the World Organization of the Scout Movement, awarded by the World Scout Committee for exceptional services to world Scouting. He was also the 71st recipient of the Silver Wolf, Norway's highest Scout award, in 1977.
