= Lahellefjorden =

Fjord in Vestfold, Norway

- Lahellefjord (unofficial)
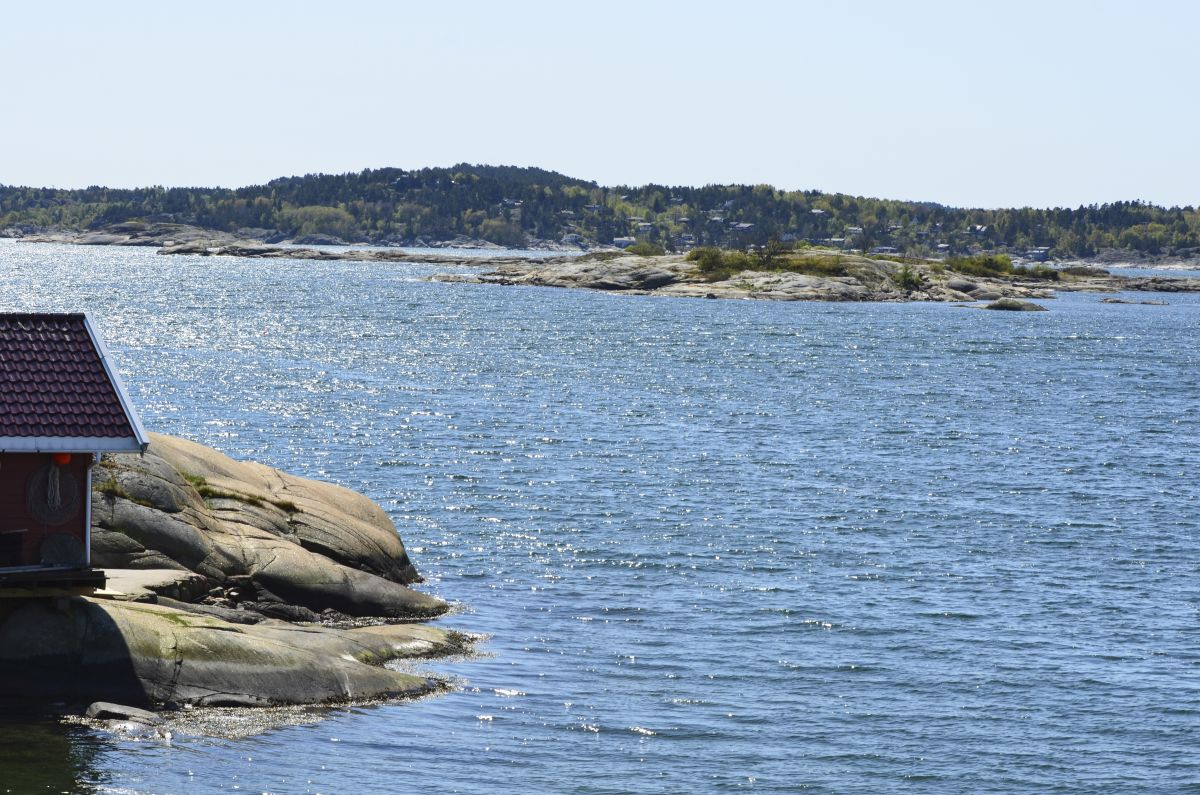
- View of the fjord
- Interactive map of the fjord
- Location: Vestfold county, Norway
- Coordinates: 59.12908°N 10.29969°E
- Type: Fjord
- Basin countries: Norway
- Max. length: 5 kilometres (3.1 mi)

Lahellefjorden is a minor fjord-arm off the main Tønsbergfjorden in Sandefjord Municipality in Vestfold county, Norway. The 5-kilometre (3.1 mi) long fjord stretches from Nattholmen island to its base at the village of Lahelle. The fjord is one of four fjords located along the Sandefjord coast.

Islands and islets within the fjord include Nattholmen (by its mouth), Faraholmen, Trondskjær, Rauern, Marøyskjæra, and Møyern.

== See also ==
- List of Norwegian fjords
