= Tønsbergfjorden =

Fjord in Vestfold, Norway

- Vestfjorden
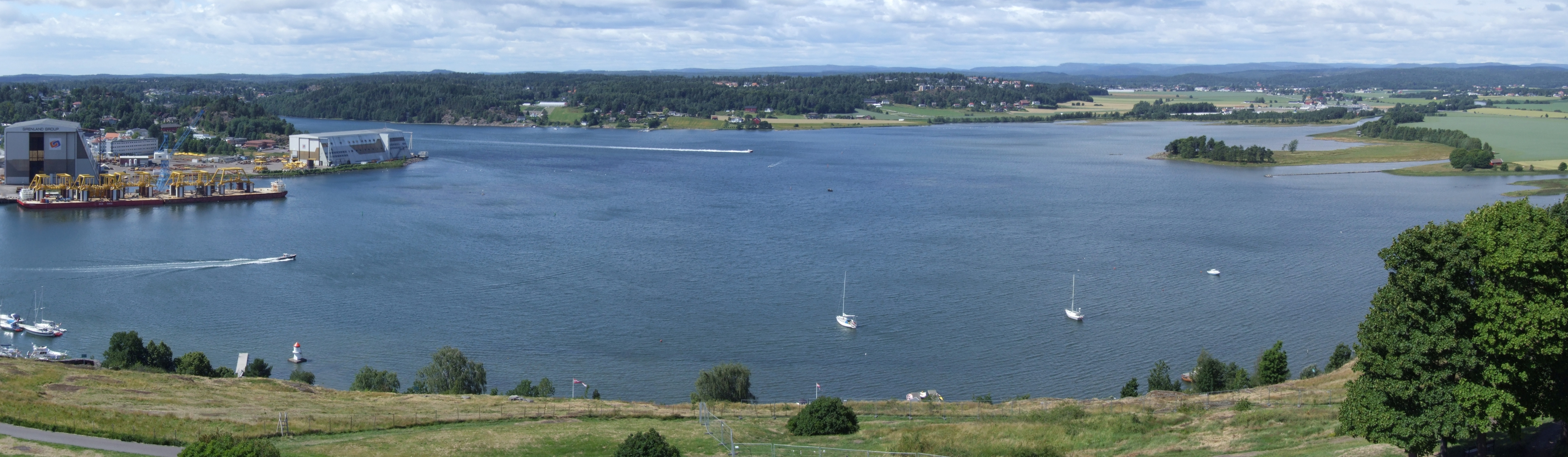
- View of the fjord
- Interactive map of the fjord
- Location: Vestfold county, Norway
- Coordinates: 59.191054°N 10.348434°E
- Type: Fjord
- Primary outflows: Ytre Oslofjord
- Basin countries: Norway
- Max. length: 25 kilometres (16 mi)
- Max. width: 5 kilometres (3.1 mi)

Tønsbergfjorden or Vestfjorden is a fjord in Vestfold county, Norway. The 25-kilometre (16 mi) long fjord runs between the mainland (Sandefjord Municipality) and the islands of Tjøme and Nøtterøy (Færder Municipality). The fjord has a number of islands located within it including Veierland, Hui, Langø, Nattholmen, and the Stauper islands.

The fjord starts out with a width of about 5 kilometres (3.1 mi) and as it heads northwards, it narrows considerably, at one point the fjord is only 250 metres (820 ft) across. The city of Tønsberg is located at the northern end of the fjord. There is a small canal that runs through Tønsberg and it connects the northern end of the fjord to the Ytre Oslofjord to the east. The southern end of the fjord is where the mouth is, emptying into the Ytre Oslofjord. The mouth lies between Verdens Ende on the east side and the Østerøya peninsula in the west. The small Lahellefjorden is an arm which branches off the Tønsbergfjorden to the west.

== See also ==
- List of Norwegian fjords
