= Eivin Røskaft =

Norwegian evolutionary biologist

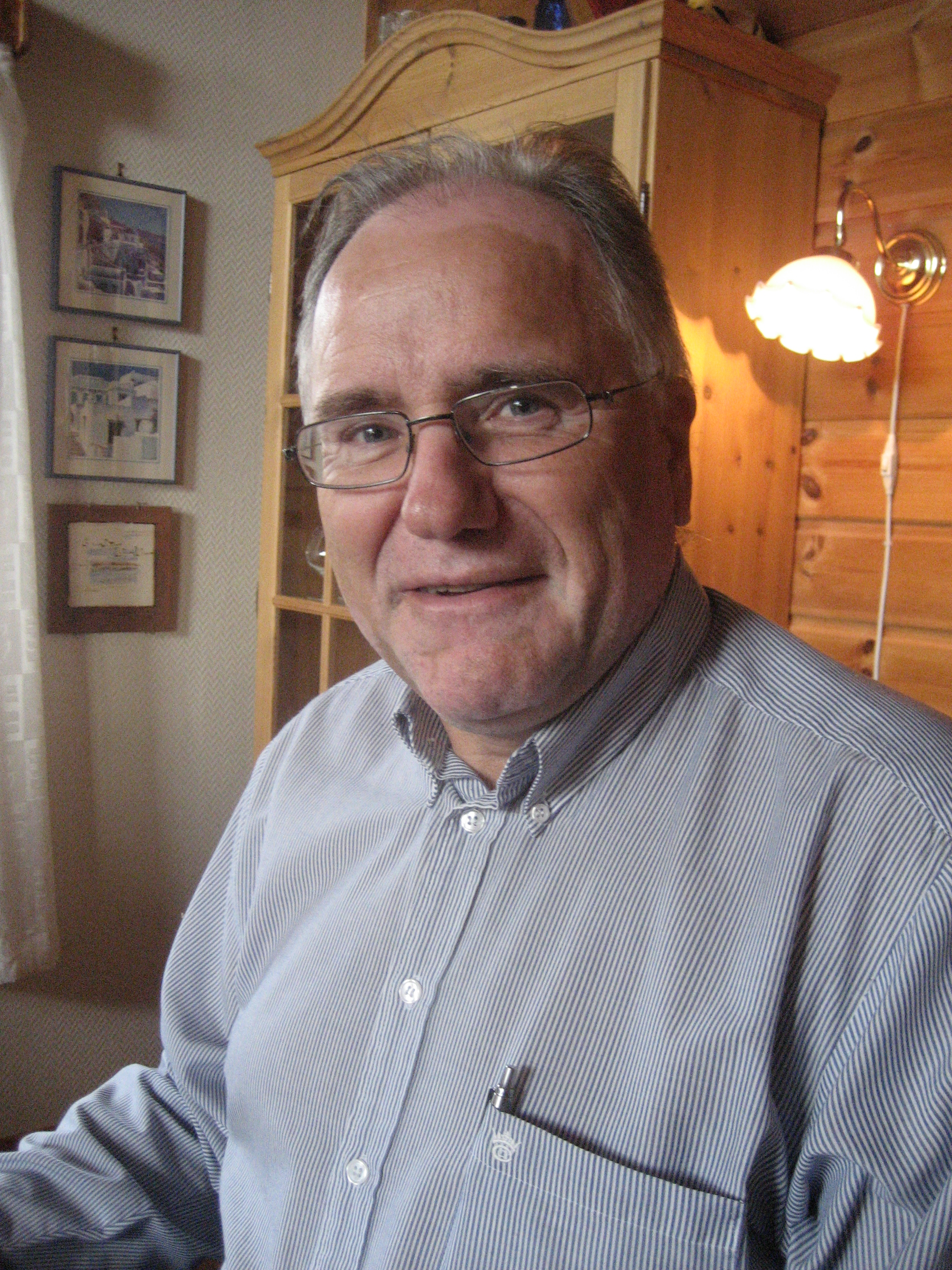
- Born: February 16, 1951 (age 75); Namsos, Norway
- Occupations: Evolutionary biologist, academic and author

Academic background
- Education: PhD. in Ethology/Sociobiology
- Alma mater: University of Trondheim

Eivin Røskaft is a Norwegian evolutionary biologist, academic, and author. He is a professor emeritus in evolutionary biology at the department of biology at the Norwegian University of Science and Technology.

Røskaft's research is focused on the application of evolutionary biology to conservation. As of 2025, his work has been cited 8900 times according to Scopus.

== Education ==
Røskaft completed his PhD in 1984 in zoology (ethology/sociobiology) under the supervision of Yngve Espmark from University of Trondheim. He then worked at the University of Trondheim from 1978 to 1982 as a research assistant before getting appointed as a scientific researcher there in 1985. Additionally, he conducted research in sociobiology as a postdoctoral researcher at the Burke Museum, University of Washington under Sievert Rohwer from 1984 to 1985, and later joined the faculty of his alma mater in 1988.

== Career ==
Røskaft started his academic career as an associate professor at the University of Trondheim in 1988, and was promoted to professor there in 1991. As of 1999, he has been serving as a professor in evolutionary biology in the department of biology at the Norwegian University of Science and Technology.

== Research ==
Røskaft's research has been focused in the fields of conservation biology, ecology, and ethology.

Røskaft has conducted research on the behavior and ecology of birds, with a focus on avian brood parasitism. His research showed that varied degrees of host species responses to cuckoo parasitism represent distinct stages in a continuous coevolutionary arms race.

Røskaft coordinated an EU-funded four-year project, AfricanBioServices, focused on understanding the relations and relationships between humans and ecosystems, and analyzed how biodiversity and human well-being are impacted by ongoing climate change, human rising population, and land use change in the Greater Serengeti-Mara ecosystem in Eastern Africa.

In his studies focused on human attitudes towards large carnivores, Roskaft assessed the self-reported fear of carnivore species in Norwegian population, and discussed how factors such as gender, age, human population density and activities related to experience with or knowledge about these animals affect this fear.

As of 2025, his work has been cited 8900 times according to Scopus.

== Awards and honors ==
- 1985 – Scientific Award, Royal Norwegian Scientific Society

== Bibliography ==
=== Books ===
- Conservation of Natural Resources: Some African & Asian Examples (2010) ISBN 9788251926010
- Northern Serengeti Road Ecology (2017) ISBN 9788245023596

=== Selected articles ===
- Moksnes, A.; Røskaft, E.; Braa, A. T.; Korsnes, L.; Lampe, H. M.; Pedersen, H. C. (1991). "Behavioural responses of potential hosts towards artificial Cuckoo eggs and dummies". Behaviour. 116 (1–2): 64–89. doi:10.1163/156853990X00365.
- Moksnes, A.; Røskaft, E. (1995). "Egg-Morphs and Host Preference in the Common Cuckoo (Cuculus-Canorus) – an Analysis of Cuckoo and Host Eggs from European Museum Collections". Journal of Zoology. 236 (4): 625–648. doi:10.1111/j.1469-7998.1995.tb02736.x.
- Clarke, A. L.; Sæther, B. E.; Røskaft, E. (1997). "Sex biases in avian dispersal: A reappraisal". Oikos. 79 (3): 429–438. Bibcode:1997Oikos..79..429C. doi:10.2307/3546885. JSTOR 3546885.
- Røskaft, E.; Bjerke, T.; Kaltenborn, B. P.; Linnell, J. D. C.; Andersen, R. (2003). "Patterns of self-reported fear towards large carnivores among the Norwegian public". Evolution and Human Behavior. 24 (3): 184–198. Bibcode:2003EHumB..24..184R. doi:10.1016/S1090-5138(03)00011-4.
- Holmern, T.; Nyahongo, J. W.; Røskaft, E. (2007). "Livestock loss caused by predators outside the Serengeti National Park, Tanzania". Biological Conservation. 135 (4): 534–542. Bibcode:2007BCons.135..518H. doi:10.1016/j.biocon.2006.10.049.
- Kideghesho, J. R.; Røskaft, E.; Kaltenborn, B. P. (2007). "Factors influencing conservation attitudes of local people in Western Serengeti, Tanzania". Biodiversity and Conservation. 16 (7): 2213–2230. Bibcode:2007BiCon..16.2213K. doi:10.1007/s10531-006-9132-8.
- Røskaft, E.; Händel, B.; Bjerke, T.; Kaltenborn, B. P. (2007). "Human attitudes towards large carnivores in Norway". Wildlife Biology. 13 (2): 172–185. doi:10.2981/0909-6396(2007)13[172:HATLCI]2.0.CO;2.
