= Christian Dons =

Norwegian businessman

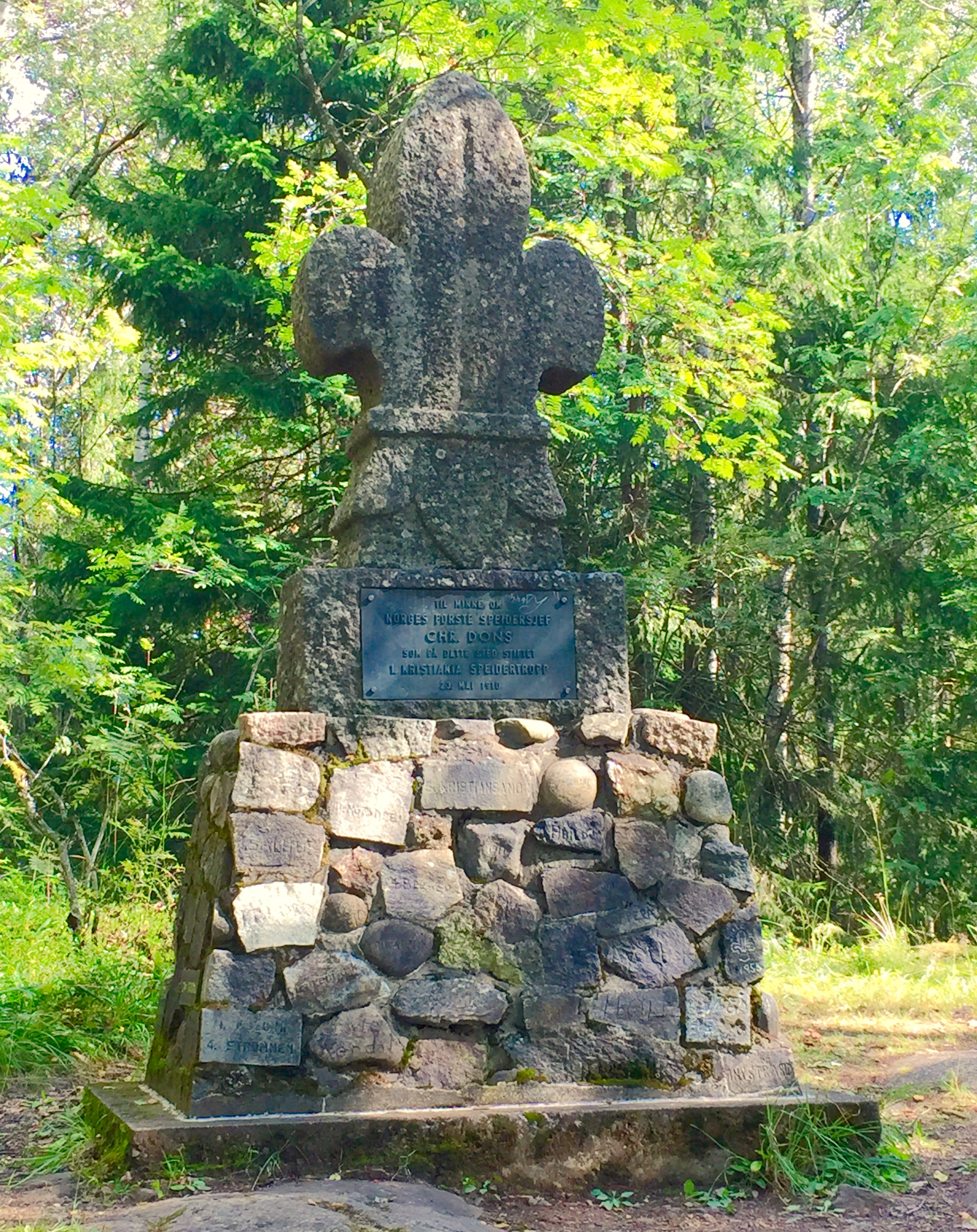
- Along Queen's Road, at the height of Sarabråten to Hauktjern, stands a granite monument to Dons commemorating the founding of Scouting in Norway, a gift from the sculptor Arne Vinje Gunnerud
- Born: 25 March 1886
- Died: 23 March 1953 (aged 66)
- Occupation: Businessman
- Known for: Norway's first Scout

Christian Fredrik Dons (25 March 1886 – 23 March 1953) was a Norwegian businessman from Oslo and Norway's first Scout, who founded the First Christiania Scout Troop in 1910. In spring 1911, he met with Hans Møller Gasmann, who had started the Second Christiania Scout Troop at Frogner in Oslo. They founded the Norwegian Guide and Scout Association (Norwegian: Norsk Speidergutt-Forbund). Dons was the Norwegian Scout Association's first Chief Scout from 1911 to 1920.

Dons was secretary and treasurer of the Norwegian Missionary Society, member of the Norwegian Missionary Council and active in the YMCA movement. Dons was buried at Ullern Church 27 March 1953.
