= YWCA-YMCA Guides and Scouts of Norway =

Norges KFUK-KFUM-speidere
- YWCA-YMCA Guides and Scouts of Norway
- Headquarters: St. Olavs plass, N-0130 Oslo
- Country: Norway
- Founded: 2003
- Membership: 13,000
- Affiliation: Speiderne i Norge
- Website https://KMSpeider.no/

The YWCA-YMCA Guides and Scouts of Norway (Norwegian: Norges KFUK-KFUM-speidere) is a Norwegian Scouting and Guiding association founded in its present form in 2003, when the YMCA-Scouts and the YWCA-Guides merged. Norges KFUK-KFUM-speidere serves about 13,000 members.

The association is a member of Speiderne i Norge, the national Scouting and Guiding federation of Norway. It is divided in 20 districts with about 350 local troops.

== History ==
Guiding within the YWCA was started in 1920, Scouting in the YMCA in 1945. In 2003 both organizations merged; for the first years after the merger, the association run both former programs and the units were free to decide if they followed the Guide or the Scout scheme. In 2007, a new organizational structure as well as new program were decided.

== Program ==
Since 2007, the association is divided in four sections according to age:

- Oppdagere (Discoverers) - ages 8 to 10
- Stifinnere (Pathfinders) - ages 10 to 12
- Vandrere (Wanderers) - ages 12 to 17
- Rovere (Rovers) - ages 17 and older

== Ideals ==
=== Scout law ===
1. A Guide and a Scout are open to God and His word.
  En speider er åpen for Gud og Hans ord.
2. A Guide and a Scout feel responsibility for themselves and others.
  En speider kjenner ansvar for seg selv og andre.
3. A Guide and a Scout are helpful and considerate.
  En speider er hjelpsom og hensynsfull.
4. A Guide and a Scout are a good friend.
  En speider er en god venn.
5. A Guide and a Scout are honest and reliable.
  En speider er ærlig og pålitelig.
6. A Guide and a Scout know nature and protect it.
  En speider kjenner naturen og verner om den.
7. A Guide and a Scout think and act on their own and try to understand others.
  En speider tenker og handler selvstendig og prøver å forstå andre.
8. A Guide and a Scout do their best in hard times and difficulties.
  En speider gjør sitt beste i motgang og vansker.
9. A Guide and a Scout are modest and try to manage on their own.
  En speider er nøysom og prøver å klare seg selv.
10. A Guide and a Scout work for peace and understanding among people.
  En speider arbeider for fred og forståelse mellom mennesker.

=== Scout promise ===
In belief of God's help, I promise
to serve God,
help others,
and live according to the scout law.

I tro på Guds hjelp lover jeg
å tjene Gud,
hjelpe andre
og leve etter speiderloven.

=== Scout motto ===
Alltid Beredt: Always Prepared.

== Emblem ==
The elements used in the logo of the Norges KFUK-KFUM-speidere are a fleur-de-lis for Boy Scouting, a trefoil for Girl Guiding and a triangle for YWCA-YMCA. The triangle is more prominent in the historic logo of Norges KFUM speidere prior to the merger.
