= Royal Norwegian Society of Sciences and Letters =

Learned society in Norway

The Royal Norwegian Society of Sciences and Letters (Danish: Det Kongelige Norske Videnskabers Selskab, DKNVS) is a Norwegian learned society based in Trondheim. It was founded in 1760 and is Norway's oldest scientific and scholarly institution. The society's Protector is King Haakon VIII of Norway. Its membership consists of no more than 435 members elected for life among the country's most prominent scholars and scientists.

The society’s Danish name predates both written standards for Norwegian and has remained unchanged after Norway’s independence from Denmark in 1814 and the spelling reforms of the 20th century.

== History ==
DKNVS was founded in 1760 by the bishop of Nidaros Johan Ernst Gunnerus, headmaster at the Trondheim Cathedral School Gerhard Schøning and Councillor of State Peter Frederik Suhm under the name Det Trondhiemske Selskab (the Trondheim Society). From 1761 it published academic papers in a series titled Skrifter. It was the northernmost learned society in the world, and was established in a time when Norway did not have universities or colleges.

It received the royal affirmation of its statutes on 17 July 1767, and was given its present name at a ceremony on 29 January 1788, king Christian VII of Denmark's birthday. In 1771, when Johann Friedrich Struensee took over the de facto rule of Denmark-Norway, Johan Ernst Gunnerus was summoned to Copenhagen, where he was given the mission to establish a university in Norway. Gunnerus did not suggest that the university be established in Trondhjem, but in southern Christianssand (Kristiansand), due to its proximity to Jutland. If this happened, he would have the Society of Sciences and Letters moved to Christianssand, to correspond with the new university. However, the plan was never carried out. Struensee's reign ended in 1772, but he reportedly dismissed the plan before this. (Kristiansand got its university in 2007.)

The society was housed in the premises of Trondheim Cathedral School until 1866, when it acquired its own localities. Since 1903 its main task was to run a museum. In 1926 there was a split in which the museum became a separate entity, receiving the assets of the learned society. Also in 1926, another publication series Det Kongelige Norske Videnskabers Selskab Forhandlinger was inaugurated. Ownership of the museum was transferred to the University of Trondheim in 1968, today the Norwegian University of Science and Technology, but DKNVS re-received some assets in a 1984 reorganization, and now controls these assets through the foundation DKNVSS.

A history of the Royal Norwegian Society of Sciences and Letters was written in 1960 by Hans Midbøe, and released in two volumes.

In connection with the 250th anniversary of the Society, Håkon With Andersen, Brita Brenna, Magne Njåstad, and Astrid Wale wrote an updated history. Also, Arild Stubhaug wrote a shorter history, prepared for a general audience.

== Organisation ==
The board of directors consists of seven people, five men and two women. It is led by praeses Steinar Supphellen and vice-praeses Kristian Fossheim. Other board members are Hanna Mustaparta, Britt Dale, Ola Dale, Joar Grimsbu and Asbjørn Moen. The daily administration is led by a secretary-general; Kristian Overskaug. The board is responsible for awarding the Gunnerus Medal for academic achievement. The medal was inaugurated in 1927.

Before 1815, the sitting King held the title of praeses, while the highest-ranked non-royal member was vice praeses. In the tradition of Gunnerus the bishop, the latter post was filled by clerics until 1820, when Christian Krohg took the seat. From 1815 the King holds the title of "protector". Today King Haakon VIII of Norway is the protector of the society.

Members of the learned society are divided into two divisions, Letters and Sciences. In 2005 there were 470 members, of whom 134 were foreign. This is a marked increase from 1996, when it had 399 members, of whom 94 were foreign.

== Awards ==
The society awards the following prizes:

=== Gunnerus Sustainability Science Award ===
The Gunnerus Sustainability Science Award is the society's highest award. It is awarded for outstanding scientific work that promotes sustainable development globally. As of 2017 the prize is awarded by DKNVS in collaboration with the Norwegian University of Science and Technology.

The award was established in 2012, as a cooperation between DKNVS, Sparebanken Midt-Norge and the foundation Technoport. It is named after the Norwegian scientist and bishop Johan Ernst Gunnerus, and consists of a cash award of 1,000,000 Norwegian kroner.

The first laureate was announced in February 2012, and the prize was handed over the 17 April in Olavshallen in Trondheim, Norway during the conference Technoport 2012.

Laureates are:

- 2017: The ecologist Carl Folke.
- 2012: The biologist Kamal Bawa for his pioneering work on population biology in rainforest areas.

=== The Royal Norwegian Society of Sciences and Letters annual prize for young researchers ===
This award is funded by I. K. Lykke. The prize is awarded annually to two people under 40 years who are "Norwegian researchers or foreign researchers at the Norwegian research institutions that have demonstrated outstanding talent, originality and effort, and who have achieved excellent results in their fields".

Awardees are:

- 1999 Baard Kasa (science) and Kaja Borthen (humanities)
- 2000 Ørjan Johansen (science) and Toril Aalberg (humanities)
- 2001 Magne Lygren (science) and Marianne Ryghaug (humanities)
- 2002 Alexander Øhrn (science) and Tanja Ellingsenand (humanities)
- 2003 Sigurd Weidemann Løvseth (science) and Cathrine Brun (humanities)
- 2004 Bård Gunnar Stokke (science) and Anne Beate Maurseth (humanities)
- 2005 Sigurd Einum (science) and Dag Trygve Truslew Haug (humanities)
- 2006 Marianne Fyhn (science), Torkel Hafting Fyhn (science) and Halvard Buhaug, (humanities)
- 2007 Marit Sletmoen (science)
- 2008 Jill Kristin Lautgeb (science) and Jo Jakobsen (humanities)
- 2009 Xavier Raynaud (science) and Terje Andreas Eikemo (humanities)
- 2010 Petter Andreas Bergh (science), Jacob Linder (science) and Jon Hernes Fiva (humanities)
- 2011 Simen Ådnøy Ellingsen (science) and Thomas Hegghammer (humanities)
- 2012 Sverre Magnus Selbach (science) and Martin Wåhlberg (humanities)
- 2013 Yasser Roudi (science) and Theresa M. Olasveengen (science)
- 2014 Andriy Bondarenko (science) and Terje Lohndal (humanities)
- 2015 Steffen Oppermann (science) and Ivar Berg (humanities)
- 2016 Jannike Solsvik (science) and Siv Gøril Brandtzæg (humanities)
- 2017 David Bassett (science) and Mats Ingulstad (humanities)
- 2018 Marie Elisabeth Rognes (science) and Trond Nordfjærn (humanities)

=== The Royal Norwegian Society of Sciences and Letters scientific annual prize ===
- 1984 Linda R. White and Terje Espevik
- 1985 Jan Ragnar Hagland, Eivin Røskaft and Trond E. Ellingsen
- 1986 Lisa Jacobsen and Jarle Mork
- 1987 Håkon With Andersen and Randi Eidsmo Reinertsen
- 1988 Dagfinn Berntzen and Berit Kjeldstad
- 1989 Arne Sandvik and Bernt-Erik Saether
- 1990 Yngvar Olsen and Karin Gjøl Hagen
- 1991 Tore C. Stiles and Jarle Hjelen
- 1992 Øyvind Solberg and Eirik Helseth
- 1993 Tor Anders Åfarli and Halvor Kjørholt
- 1995 Jon Thomas Kringlebotn and Tor Grande
- 1996 Stig Arild Slørdahl and Geir Johnsen
- 1997 Magne Sætersdal and Baard Pedersen
- 1998 Jarle André Haugan
- 1999 May-Britt Moser and Edvard Moser
- 2000 Rolf Hobson
- 2001 Jonathan W. Moses and Erlend Rønnekleiv
- 2002 Johannes Skaar and Jarle Tufto

== Heads of the society ==
This is a list of the heads of the Royal Norwegian Society of Sciences and Letters:

Protector (praeses until 1815)

- 1772–1805: Crown Prince Frederik of Denmark-Norway
- 1805–1814: Crown Prince Christian Frederick of Denmark-Norway
- 1814–1815: vacant
- 1815–1818: Crown Prince Charles III John of Norway and Sweden
- 1818–1859: Oscar I of Norway and Sweden
- 1859–1872: Charles IV of Norway and Sweden
- 1872–1905: Oscar II of Norway and Sweden
- 1906–1957: Haakon VII of Norway
- 1957–1991: Olav V of Norway
- 1991–2026: Harald V of Norway
- Since 2026: Haakon VIII of Norway

Praeses (vice praeses until 1815)

- 1766–1773: Johan Ernst Gunnerus
- 1773–1780: Ole Irgens
- 1780–1791: Christian Frederik Hagerup
- 1791–1803: Johan Christian Schønheyder
- 1804–1820: Peter Olivarius Bugge
- 1820–1828: Christian Krohg
- 1829–1832: Niels Stockfleth Schultz
- 1832–1832: Frederik Christoffer, greve af Trampe
- 1833–1838: Christian Hersleb Hornemann
- 1838–1851: Frederik Moltke Bugge
- 1851–1855: Hans Jørgen Darre
- 1855–1865: Christian Petersen
- 1865–1870: Andreas Grimelund
- 1870–1872: Hans Jørgen Darre
- 1872–1874: Andreas Grimelund
- 1874–1883: Bernhard Ludvig Essendrop
- 1883–1897: Karl Ditlev Rygh
- 1897–1899: Johannes Sejersted
- 1899–1902: Knud H. Lossius
- 1903–1914: Bjarne Lysholm
- 1914–1926: Axel Sommerfelt
- 1926–1933: Halfdan Bryn
- 1933–1945: Ragnvald Iversen
- 1946–1946: Viggo Brun
- 1946–1949: Ragnvald Iversen
- 1950–1958: Thorolf Vogt
- 1958–1965: Harald Wergeland
- 1966–1973: Tord Godal
- 1974–1981: Sigmund Selberg
- 1982–1989: Grethe Authén Blom
- 1990–1995: Haakon Olsen
- 1996–1999: Peder Borgen
- 2000–2004: Karsten Jakobsen
- 2005–2010: Steinar Supphellen
- 2010–2013: Kristian Fossheim
- 2013–2013: Jan Ragnar Hagland
- 2014–2016: Helge Holden
- 2017-2019: Ida Bull
- 2020-present May Thorseth

== See also ==
- Norwegian Academy of Science and Letters, another Norwegian learned society
