= Norwegian Guide and Scout Association =

Norges Speiderforbund
- Norwegian Guide and Scout Association
- Headquarters: St. Olavs gate 25, 0166 Oslo
- Country: Norway
- Founded: 1978
- Membership: 18,500
- Affiliation: The Guides and Scouts of Norway, WOSM, WAGGGS
- Website speiding.no

The Norwegian Guide and Scout Association (Norwegian: Norges Speiderforbund, NSF) is a Norwegian Scouting and Guiding association founded in its present form in 1978, when the Norwegian Boy Scout Organization (founded in 1911 and among the charter members of the World Organization of the Scout Movement in 1922) and the Norwegian Girl Guide Organization (founded in 1921 and an early member of World Association of Girl Guides and Girl Scouts) merged.

NSF is a member of Speiderne i Norge, the national Scouting and Guiding federation of Norway. NSF is also a member of WOSM and WAGGGS.

== Program ==
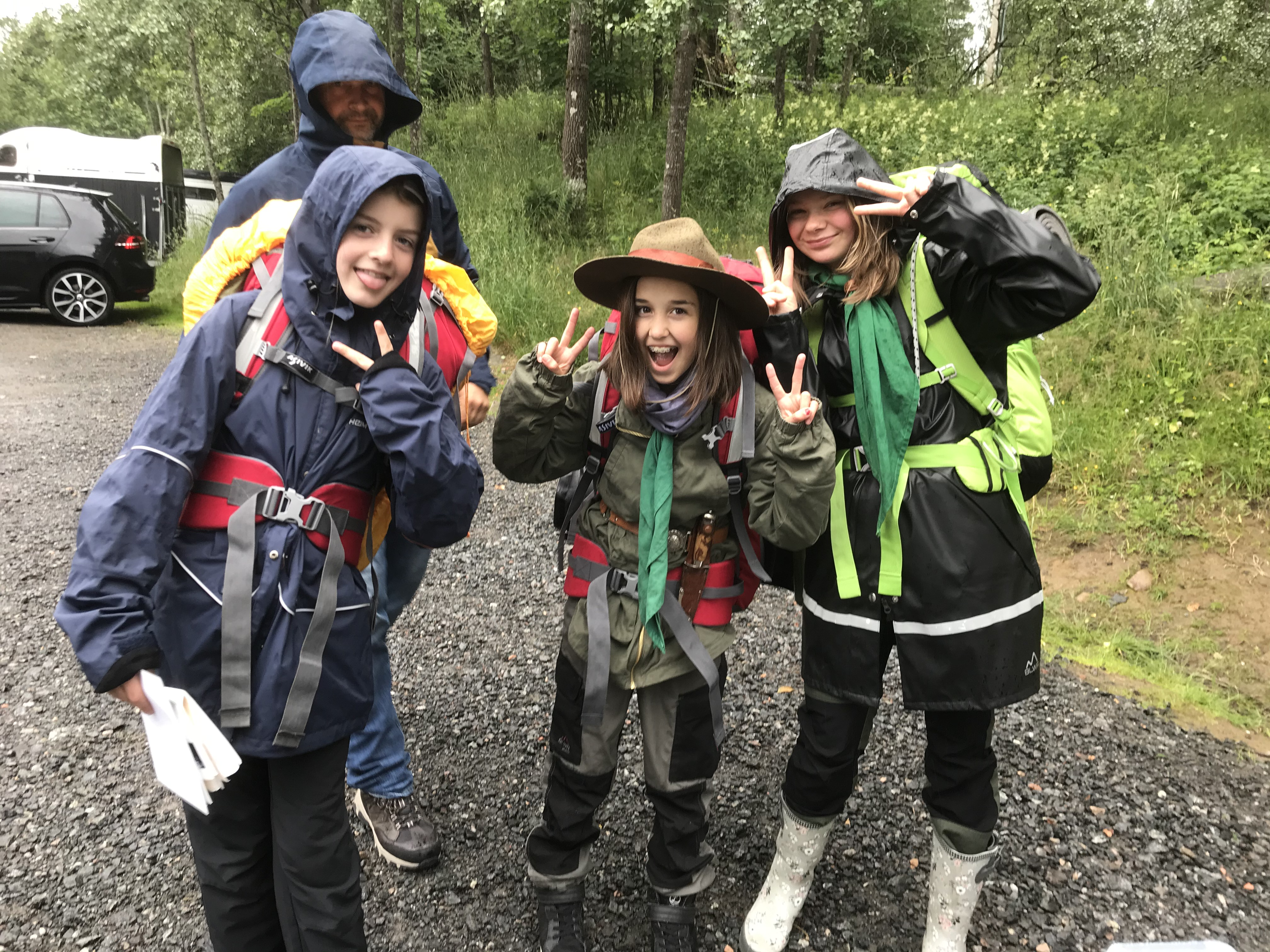
Young Norwegian scouts from the 1. Haugerud platoon on their way to spending a rainy weekend in the forest. Outdoor activity is a central part of scouting in Norway.

=== Purpose ===
Scouting's main purpose is to develop young members into independent, self sufficient and responsible adults. This is achieved using a training program with outdoor recreation and practical activities, teamwork in small groups (patrol system), and by actively using the "learning by doing" method.

=== Themes ===
Program of the Norges speiderforbund is structured into five themes:

- Outdoor Life
- Creativity
- Friendships
- Community Involvement
- Life quality

The program is structured to provide members with progression to continually meet new challenges. The methods are very much based on practical aspects and mastery over theory. As might be expected in Norway, outdoor activities is emphasized, with much of the program centered around classical themes like first aid, camping, pioneering, field cooking, woodcraft and hiking.

=== Age structure ===
To be adapted to the individual member's level of development, the program is divided up into age groups by grade (division varies):

- Beavers – ages 6 to 8
- Cubs/Brownies – ages 8 to 10
- Scouts/Guides – ages 10 to 16
- Rovers – ages 16 to 24

== History ==
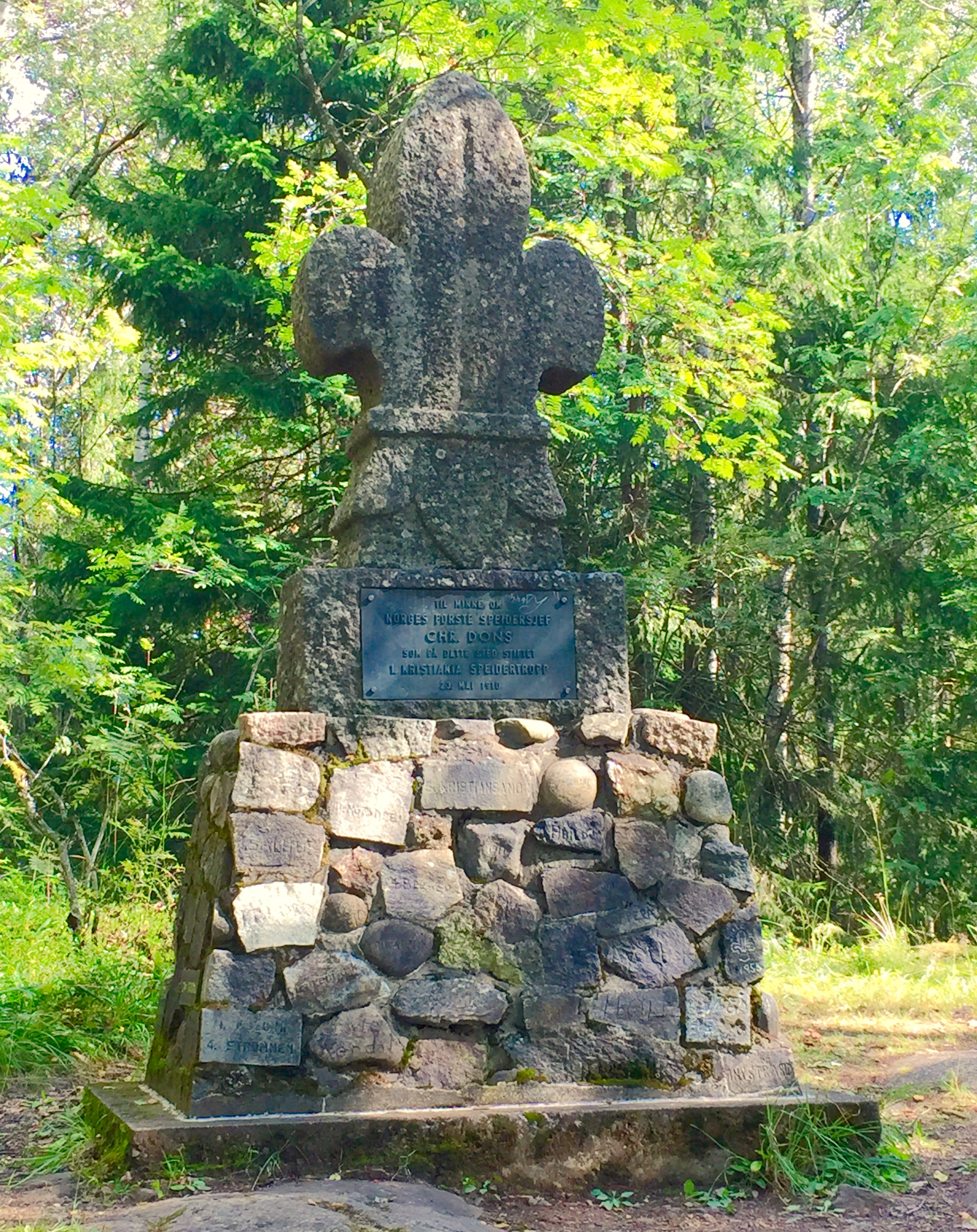
The Dons monument erected on Sarabråten near Oslo, where the first Norwegian Scout group was founded.

=== The start of boy scouting ===
Thanks to Norway's economical and constitutional ties to Britain, Norway was among the early nations where scouting emerged. The first scouting activity took place in 1909, and in 1910, the 1st Christiania Scout group was established in the then named Christiania (later Oslo) as Norway's first official Scout group. In early 1911 the 2nd Christiania was founded. These two initial scout troops founded the Norwegian Boy-Scout association (Norsk Speidergutt-Forbund) in February of the same year, marking the official beginning of the Scout Movement in Norway.

=== Girl Guides in Norway ===
In 1916, the head of the Danish Girl Guides (Dansk Pikespejerforbund) was invited by Queen Maud to Christiania to give a lecture on girl guiding. This resulted in a working committee to establish scouting for girls, but an association failed to form. The Norwegian branch of YWCA had however taken up the challenge, starting several scouting groups for girls. On 3 November 1920, a number of these groups formed the Norwegian YWCA-scouts (Norges KFUK-speidere). The association's oldest squad, Trondheim 1 had been established back in 1915 in Trondheim.

Girl scouting groups had however emerged in Norway in connection to the established boy-scout groups, well before the initiative by the Queen. An article on boy scouting in Stavanger Aftenblad from back in 1910 stated that scout work has already spread to the girls. These independent girl scouting groups eventually merged into the Norwegian girl scouts association (Norsk Speiderpikeforbund). The official foundation date was set to 1 July 1921.

=== Later development ===
In 1922, the Norwegian scouting associations gained recognition by the World Bureau in 1922, as a founding member of the World Organization of the Scout Movement. Several religious associations like the YMCA, Methodist Church and Salvation Army started their own scouting groups.

During the Second World War Norway was occupied, and with their international ties and obvious militarily useful skills, the collaborator government fared the scouts could become a center for resistance work. All forms of scouting were banned in September 1941. The funds, equipment, banners and even uniform details were to be turned over to authorities. Scout leaders spirited away what they could, but many groups lost much of their equipment and funds. The youth wing of collaborator political party Nasjonal Samling was the only allowed scout-like activity allowed. After the war, scouting was quickly taken up again.

The 14th World Scout Jamboree in 1975 took place in Norway.

On April 23, 1978 unit Norsk Speidergutt-Forbund (NSF) og Norsk Speiderpikeforbund (NSPF) merged to form the Norges speiderforbund (NSF) for both girls and boys, while the YMCA/YWCA, Methodist and Salvation Army groups elected to remain separate, though they often participate and cooperate with the NSF-groups and participate in their jamborees.

In 1985, Dr. Gisle Johnson was awarded the Bronze Wolf, the only distinction of the World Organization of the Scout Movement, awarded by the World Scout Committee for exceptional services to world Scouting.

=== Adjusting the religious aspect ===
In its original form, Christianity was a central pillar of scouting. Both the Scout law and Scout pledge reflect this. All members organizations of the World Organization of the Scout Movement are required to have a spiritual aspect. As the association viewed itself as a Christian organization based on Christian values, several non-religious groups applying for membership in the Norwegian Guide and Scout Association had been rejected.

With an increasingly secular society and rising number of immigrant youth with religious background other than Christianity in post-war Norway, the 1st paragraph of the Norwegian Scouts law requiring Christian faith became contentious. It was rewritten in 1978 to a non-denominational "A Scout is open to God and His Word", but this too was seen as excluding for the increasingly non-religious member mass. Based on changes to the British Girl Guide pledge a few years earlier, the paragraph was changed again in 2016, to "A scout will seek their own belief, and respect that of others". In 2018 the scouts pledge was changed accordingly.

== Structure ==
As of 2015, NSF had 18,500 members, organised in 29 districts and 6 corps with 450 local groups.

== Activities ==
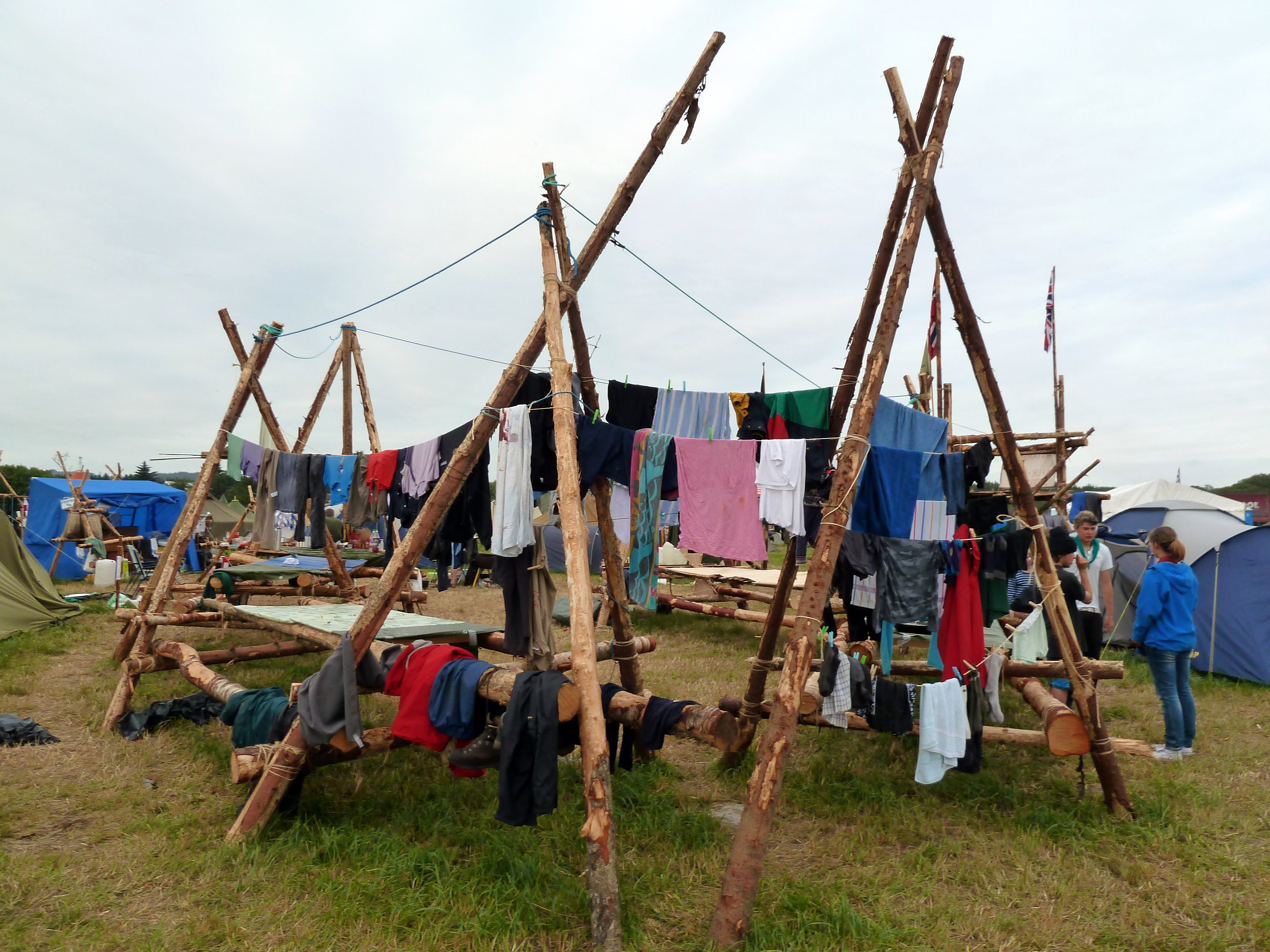
Most Norwegian groups participate in a week long scout camp during the summer. Typical pioneering work here used to dry clothing, Farsund, 2010.

The main activities of the Norges speiderforbund takes place in work units (see age groups above) in Scout groups. The meetings are regular, often weekly, and with several trips a year. Most Scout groups offer their members a camp of about one week's duration each summer.

NSF also have some events on the regional and federation level. At the federal level there's national jamboree, held every four years. The last Norwegian national Jamboree was held in Bodø in 2017, as the 2021 national Jamboree could not be held due to the COVID-19 pandemic.

At an international level, NSF along with Norges KFUK-KFUM-speidere are due to host Roverway in 2024. The motto of this event is ‘North of the Ordinary’.

Regional competitions are where patrols compete in Scouting skills. The best patrols in each region qualify for the Norwegian Scouting Championships. Each national Scouting championship and region banner competition lasts a weekend. Some typical exercises during these events are the orienteering, the pioneering, circular track with nature study, citizenship and first aid.

As part of the Norges Speiderforbund of Community Involvement, the Scout campaign has been held every year since 2004. This is a fundraiser that goes to NRC projects.

== Circuits ==
NSF is divided up into 29 circuits (Norwegian: krets). Groups include members of the same circuit. The circles are the link between the Federation and groups.

- Asker og Bærum krets
- Aust-Agder krets
- Follo krets
- Finmark krets (Non Activity)
- Fredrikstad krets
- Glåmdal krets
- Grenland krets
- Gudbrandsdal krets
- Hedmark krets
- Helgeland krets
- Hordaland krins
- Hålogaland krets
- Nedre Buskerud krets
- Nord-Troms krets
- Nord-Trøndelag krets
- Oslospeiderne
- Romerike krets
- Romsdal og Nordmøre krets
- Ryvarden krets
- Salten krets
- Sogn og Fjordane krets
- Sunnmøre krets
- Sørlandet krets
- Sør-Trøndelag krets
- Tele-Busk krets
- Vesterlen krets
- Vestfold krets
- Vestoppland krets
- Østre Østfold krets
- Øvre Buskerud krets

== National jamboree ==
Every four years there is a week-long national jamboree for all NSF members, and usually also participants from other nations. Between national jamborees there are usually circuit camps every four years, and group camps every two years. The following regions have hosted national jamborees:

=== Norsk Speidergutt-Forbund (NSF) ===
- 1914 Christiania
- 1916 Bergen
- 1920 Trondheim
- 1924 Hamar
- 1928 Åndalsnes
- 1932 Mandal
- 1936 Jeløya
- 1940 Tromsø (Cancelled due to WW2)
- 1948 Mandal
- 1952 Verdalsøra
- 1956 Voss
- 1960 Brunlanes
- 1964 Bodø
- 1968 Lillehammer
- 1972 Røros
- 1976 Åndalsnes

du

=== Norsk Speiderpikeforbund (NSPF) ===
- 1923 Brandbu
- 1925 Stabekk
- 1929 Steinkjersannan
- 1933 Jørstadmoen
- 1937 Mandal
- 1948 Borre
- 1953 Olberg
- 1957 Rømoen
- 1961 Ringerike
- 1965 Følling
- 1969 Kongsted (in Fredrikstad Municipality)
- 1973 Alvdal
- 1978 Ulven in Os Municipality

=== Norges Speiderforbund (NSF) ===
- 1981 Åsnes, where the uniform and plaid neckerchief of the new organization was introduced.
- 1985 Notodden, noted for an event of extreme flooding, putting much of the campsite under water during the camp.
- 1989 Skaugum
- 1993 Ingelsrud in Eidskog Municipality
- 1997 Austrått (at Austråttborgen)
- 2001 Urban 2001 (Fredrikstad)
- 2005 Fri:05 (Ingelsrud in Eidskog Municipality)
- 2009 Utopia (Åndalsnes in Rauma Municipality)
- 2013 Stavanger 2013 (Stavanger/Hafrsfjord)
- 2017 Nord 2017 Bodø
- 2021 Agenda 2021, held as a distributed camp of 100 smaller camps due to the COVID-19 pandemic

== Ideals ==
=== Guide and Scout Law ===
The Norwegian scouts translated to English:

1. A Guide and a Scout seeks their own belief and respect that of others.
2. A Guide and a Scout feel responsibility for themselves and others.
3. A Guide and a Scout are helpful and considerate.
4. A Guide and a Scout are a good friend.
5. A Guide and a Scout are honest and reliable.
6. A Guide and a Scout know nature and protect it.
7. A Guide and a Scout think and act on their own and try to understand others.
8. A Guide and a Scout do their best in hard times and difficulties.
9. A Guide and a Scout are modest and try to manage on their own.
10. A Guide and a Scout work for peace and understanding among people.

=== Guide and Scout promise ===
I promise, to the best of my ability,
to seek my own belief,
to help others and
to live according to the Guide and Scout Law.

== Scout motto ==
Alltid Beredt: Always Prepared.
