= Dag Kavlie =

Norwegian shipping engineer (born 1939)

- Born: 14 April 1939 (age 87); Oslo
- Citizenship: Norwegian
- Education: Norwegian Institute of Technology
- Scientific career
- Fields: ship construction
- Workplaces: Norwegian Institute of Technology lecturer 1973–1976 professor 1976–1991 rector 1984–1990

Dag Kavlie (born 14 April 1939) is a Norwegian shipping engineer. He was a professor and rector (1984–1990) at the Norwegian Institute of Technology, and later worked for the Research Council of Norway.

== Career ==
He was born in Oslo, and took the siv.ing. degree at the Norwegian Institute of Technology in 1963. He then spent a year as a conscript in the Royal Norwegian Navy, took the doctorate in ship construction at the Institute of Technology, studied at the University of California at Berkeley before entering the shipping sector. In 1972 he took the Ph.D. degree. He then returned to academia, being hired as a lecturer at the Institute of Technology. In 1976 he was promoted to professor. From 1980 he was the deputy rector of the Norwegian Institute of Technology, and from 1984 to 1990 he served as rector. Deputy rector during this period was Kjell Egil Eimhjellen. The Kavlie–Eimhjellen team was succeeded in July 1990 by rector Karsten Jakobsen and deputy rector Emil Spjøtvoll. Kavlie continued as a professor until 1991.

He was a member of the technical committee of Det Norske Veritas for many years, and has also held positions in NTNF, the European Science Foundation, the International Ship and Offshore Structures Congress and the Nordic Research Council, a predecessor of NordForsk. During his research career he was also a visiting scholar at Berkeley and the Massachusetts Institute of Technology. In 1993 he was hired in the newly established Research Council of Norway, and from 1995 to 1998 he was their director of strategy. He later worked as an advisor. Among other projects, he was responsible for the establishment of fourteen new "Centres of Research-Driven Innovation". In 2012 he was appointed by Foreign Minister Espen Barth Eide to serve on the Governing Board of the U.S. Norway Fulbright Foundation for Educational Exchange.

He is a fellow of the Norwegian Academy of Technological Sciences.

== Personal life ==
Kavlie resides in Vestre Aker, Oslo. His hobbies include horticulture, cycling and cross-country skiing. He participates regularly in the Birkebeinerrennet ski race.

Academic offices
Preceded by Inge Johansen	Rector of the Norwegian Institute of Technology; 1984–1990	Succeeded by Karsten Jakobsen
