= Gunnerus Medal =

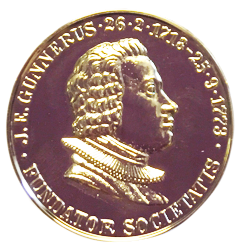
Avers of the Gunnerus Medal, awarded by the Royal Norwegian Society of Sciences and Letters.

The Gunnerus Medal (Norwegian: Gunnerusmedaljen) is a medal awarded by the learned society Royal Norwegian Society of Sciences and Letters.

It was inaugurated in 1927, and named after Johan Ernst Gunnerus, founder of the learned society. Members of the learned society are eligible to suggest candidates, and the medal is awarded by the board of directors.

Current bearers of the medal are Johannes Moe (since 1988), Stig Strömholm (1997), Olaf I. Rønning (1998), Jørn Sandnes (1999), Gunnar Sundnes (2001), Peder Johan Borgen (2003), Harald A. Øye (2004), Jens Glad Balchen (2006), Olav Smidsrød (2008) and Ivar Giaever (2010).

== Awardees ==
Medal Recipients
| Year | Awardee |
|---|---|
| 2023 | Nils Christian Stenseth |
| 2022 | Helge Holden |
| 2021 | Lars Walløe |
| 2021 | Arnoldus Schytte Blix |
| 2020 | May-Britt Moser |
| 2020 | Edvard Moser |
| 2016 | Ernst Håkon Jahr |
| 2015 | Steinar Supphellen |
| 2015 | Kristian Fossheim |
| 2012 | Håkon Bleken |
| 2011 | Karsten Jakobsen |
| 2011 | Jon Ofstad Lamvik |
| 2010 | Ivar Giæver |
| 2008 | Olav Smidsrød |
| 2006 | Jens Glad Balchen |
| 2004 | Harald A. Øye |
| 2003 | Peder Johan Borgen |
| 2002 | Atle Selberg |
| 2001 | Gunnar Sundnes |
| 1999 | Jørn Sandnes |
| 1998 | Olaf I. Rønning |
| 1997 | Stig Strömholm |
| 1996 | Magne Skodvin |
| 1994 | Gustav Lorentzen |
| 1992 | Grethe Authén Blom |
| 1991 | Katrine Seip Førland |
| 1991 | Tormod Førland |
| 1990 | Kristen B. Eik-Nes |
| 1989 | Arne E. Holm |
| 1988 | Johannes Moe |
| 1987 | John Ugelstad |
| 1986 | Olav Gjærevoll |
| 1985 | Helge Ingstad |
| 1984 | Olav Næs |
| 1983 | Sverre Westin |
| 1977 | Einar Haugen |
| 1975 | Erling Sivertsen |
| 1973 | Ove Arbo Høeg |
| 1970 | Hans Peter L'Orange |
| 1970 | Harald Wergeland |
| 1968 | Sverre Steen |
| 1966 | Ivar Asbjørn Følling |
| 1964 | Odd Hassel |
| 1963 | Carl Johan Sverdrup Marstrander |
| 1962 | Thoralf Albert Skolem |
| 1960 | Johan Peter Falkberget |
| 1960 | Egil Andersen Hylleraas |
| 1959 | Didrik Arup Seip |
| 1958 | Viggo Brun |
| 1957 | Ragnvald Iversen |
| 1957 | Otto Lous Mohr |
| 1955 | Olaf Holtedahl |
| 1952 | Halvdan Koht |
| 1950 | Kristian Emil Schreiner |
| 1949 | Konrad Hartvig Isak Rosenvinge Nielsen |
| 1948 | Bjørn Helland-Hansen |
| 1946 | Magnus Bernhard Olsen |
| 1938 | Vilhelm Frimann Koren Bjerknes |
| 1935 | Theodor Frölich |
| 1935 | Valentin Fürst |
| 1934 | Sigurd Einbu |
| 1931 | Sigval Schmidt-Nielsen |
| 1930 | Just Knud Qvigstad |
| 1927 | Waldemar C. Brøgger |
| 1927 | Lars Christensen |
| - | Nils Pedersen |
| - | Theodor Petersen |
| - | Hjalmar Riiser-Larsen |
