= Inge Johansen =

Norwegian electrical engineer

Inge Johannes Tjernes Johansen (21 May 1928 – 5 December 2018) was a Norwegian electrical engineer and academic.

== Career ==
Johansen was born in Gjerpen Municipality to an electrician and a homemaker. He took the sivling. degree, and in 1957, the dr.techn. degree. From 1959 to 1985, he was a professor of high-voltage technology at the Norwegian Institute of Technology. From 1975 he was the deputy rector, from 1976 to 1984 he served as rector, and from 1985 to 1989 was the director of the NTNF. In 1990, he returned to academia as a professor of elkraftteknikk. He chaired the Statoil board from 1984 to 1987 but resigned together with the rest of the board members after they lost control over spending in the Mongstad project.

Johansen contributed to the establishment of Kathmandu University, for which a university building was named after him: the Prof. Inge Johansen Engineering Block.

Johansen was decorated in 1981 as a Commander of the Order of St. Olav for his work in technical research and education in Norway.

== Bibliography ==
- "Energi og Etikk -Etiske perspektiver på elforsyning", Forlaget Press, 2006

== Links ==
- Inge Johansen at NTNU.no
- Inge Johansen, private archive at (University Library of Trondheim, Dorabiblioteket)

Academic offices
Preceded by Johannes Moe	Rector of the Norwegian Institute of Technology; 1976–1984	Succeeded by Dag Kavlie
Business positions
Preceded by Finn Lied	Chair of Statoil; 1984–1987	Succeeded by Jan Erik Langangen
