= Signe Kjelstrup =

Norwegian chemist and professor

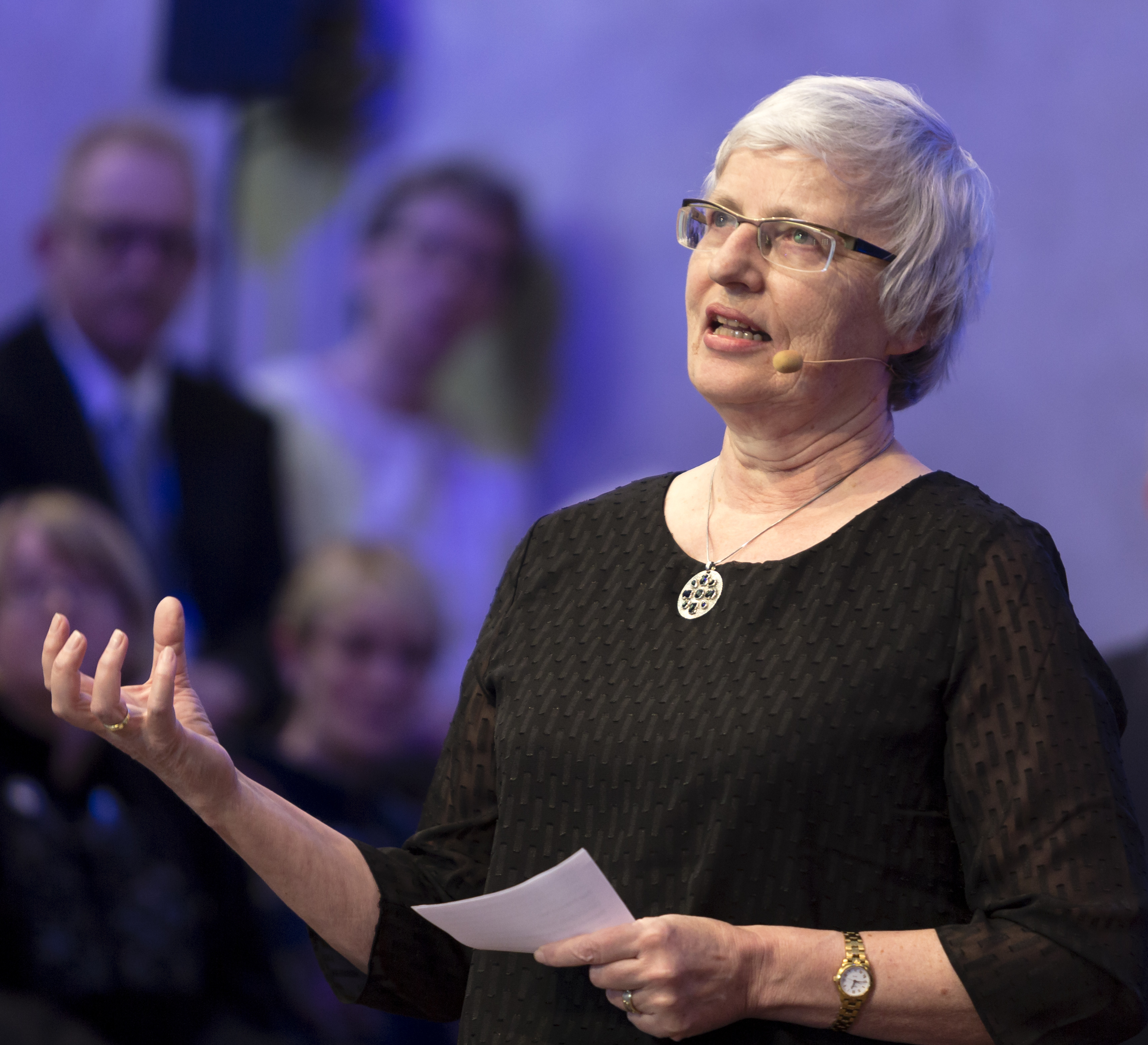
- Signe Kjelstrup in 2016
- Born: August 27, 1949 (age 77); Oslo
- Education: Norges tekniske høgskole (NTH)
- Occupations: Professor of physical chemistry at the Norwegian University of Science and Technology (NTNU)
- Honors: Norsk Kjemisk Selskaps medalje til minne om Guldberg og Waages massevirkningslov

Signe Helene Kjelstrup (born August 29, 1949) is a Norwegian professor of physical chemistry at the Norwegian University of Science and Technology (NTNU) in Trondheim, Norway. She is a principal investigator at PoreLab, a Center of Excellence at NTNU.

Her main area of research is non-equilibrium thermodynamics, and in August 2019 PoreLab hosted «The International Workshop on Non-Equilibrium Thermodynamics in Porous Media» on the occasion of professor Kjelstrup's 70th birthday.

== Education and professional career ==
Kjelstrup was born in Oslo. She has an Msc (sivilingeniør) in chemistry from the Norwegian Institute of Technology (NTH), Trondheim, (1971) and her thesis received the honour «commended to the King» (laudabilis cum litteris commendatitiis). This was the first time in the history of the school that a woman received this highest honour.

In 1974 she received the degree lic. techn. with the thesis Complex formations in alkali-aluminium fluoride melts. She later received a Fulbright grant and worked as an assistant professor at the School of Medicine and Dentistry, University of Rochester (New York, USA).

She has a dr.techn. degree from 1982. Her thesis is titled On the energetics of coupled transport processes : a theoretical and experimental irreversible thermodynamic investigation.

In 1985 Kjelstrup was appointed professor at NTH. Together with Professor Tormod Førland, she developed the field of irreversible thermodynamics there. Her scientific work has been of great importance in this field. She is particularly interested in improving the second law of thermodynamics and of renewable energy technology.

She has been a visiting professor at several foreign universities: Medical College of Ohio (1988/1989); Leiden University (1997/1998); Kyoto University (2000) and University of Barcelona (2004).

== Publications (selection) ==
- List of publications by Signe Kjelstrup in BIBSYS (Norway)
- List of publications by Signe Kjelstrup in CRIStin (The Norwegian Scientific Index)

== Memberships and honours ==
Kjelstrup is an elected member of Norwegian Academy of Science and Letters, Norwegian Academy of Technological Sciences and Royal Norwegian Society of Sciences and Letters.

She has been awarded an honorary doctorate at The Northeastern University of China.

She has received the Guldberg and Waage medal from the Norwegian Chemical Society.

In 1980 she received «Fridtjof Nansens belønning for yngre forskere», (the Fridtjof Nansen Reward for young scientists).

In 2018 her daughter, the composer Maja Ratkje, wrote the musical work «A Highway in State Space», dedicated to Kjelstrup and inspired by her research. The work, which has the same title as one of Kjelstrup's research articles, was part of the project and album Sound of Science, where seven composers were invited by the musician Jeffrey Zeigler to contribute with a new piece of music each.
