= Stein Magnus Aukland =

Norwegian radiologist, researcher and professor

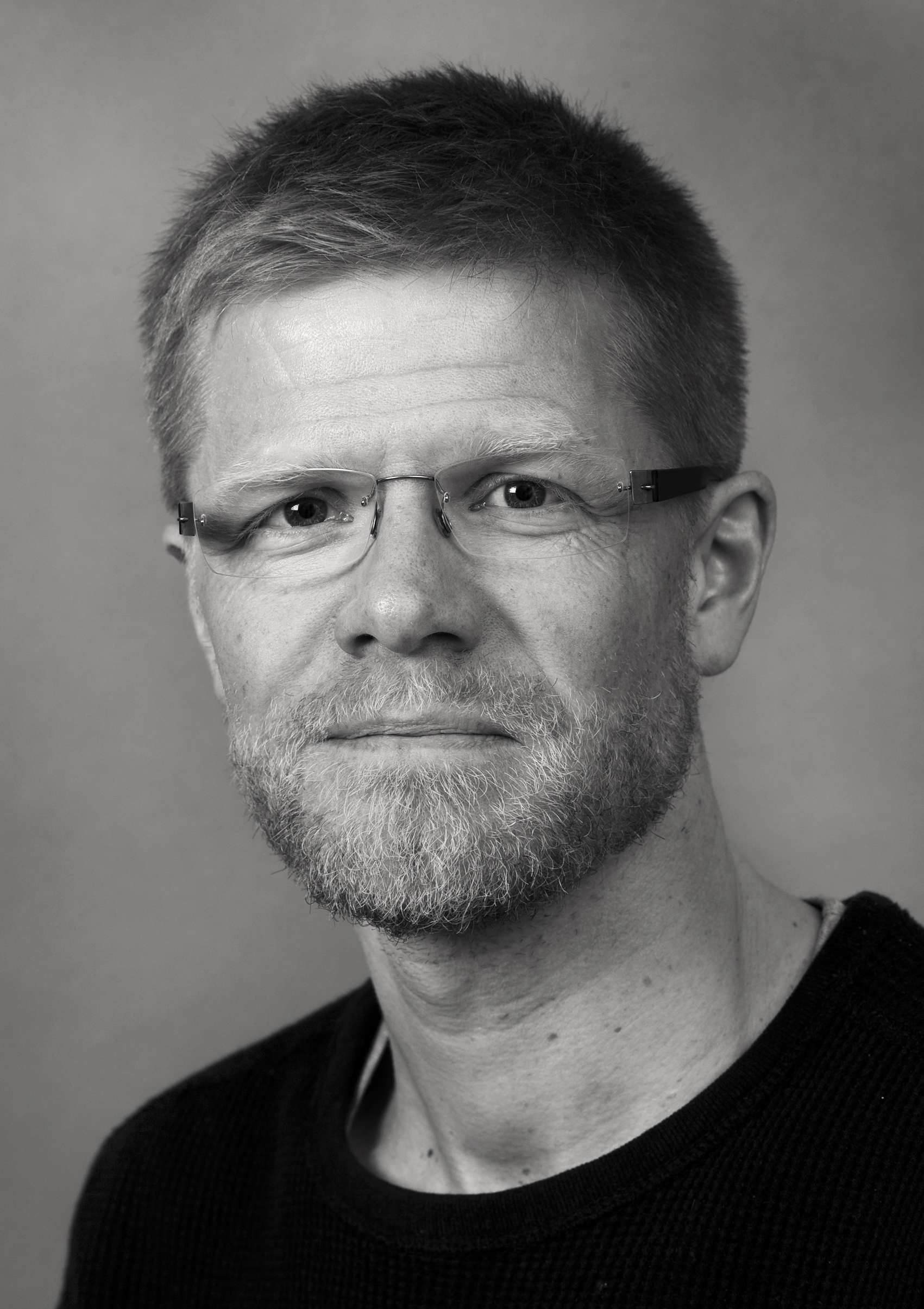
- A.S. Herdlevær / UiB
- Born: July 16, 1967 (age 59); Oslo, Norway
- Education: University of Bergen
- Occupation: Radiologist
- Years active: 1992–present

Stein Magnus Aukland (born 16 July 1967) is a Norwegian radiologist, researcher, and professor of radiology at the University of Bergen who specializes in the long-term health effects on at-risk children, including children born prematurely, exposed to substances during pregnancy, or involved in suspected child abuse. He is the son of physiologist Knut Aukland.

Educated at the University of Bergen, he obtained his cand.med. degree in 1992. After completing his studies, he worked as a general practitioner in Aure Municipality from 1995 to 1996. He then began his residency in radiology at Ålesund Hospital, a position he held from 1996 to 2000, before continuing at Haukeland University Hospital. In 2001, he became a staff radiologist at Haukeland University Hospital, earning his specialty in radiology in 2002. Since then, he has been working at the children unit of the Radiology Department at Haukeland University Hospital.

In 2011, Aukland completed his PhD, which focused on radiological findings of the brain and lungs in young adults born prematurely or with low birth weight. This research addressed their structural abnormalities, their connections to neonatal factors, and the potential long-term clinical consequences. In 2018, he was appointed as a professor of radiology. His research includes long-term follow-up of premature children as well as MRI examinations of children exposed to drugs or alcohol during pregnancy, cancer patients, and in cases of suspected child abuse.

In addition to his research, Aukland is called upon as an expert witness in legal cases involving suspected child abuse, providing radiological evaluations to clarify injuries. He also teaches radiology at the University of Bergen and speaks at international radiology conferences. Moreover, he has contributed to radiology education in Tanzania by organizing and teaching courses modeled after Norwegian specialist programs.

== Selected publications ==
- Aukland, Stein Magnus; Rosendahl, Karen; Owens, Catherine M. et al. (2009). "Neonatal bronchopulmonary dysplasia predicts abnormal pulmonary HRCT in long-term survivors of extreme preterm birth". Thorax. 64 (5): 405–410.
- Aukland, Stein Magnus; Westerhausen, René; Plessen, Kerstin J. et al. (2011). "Selectively reduced posterior corpus callosum size in a population-based sample of young adults born with low birth weight". American Journal of Neuroradiology. 32 (5): 970–975.
- Arne Stray-Pedersen, Claus Møller, Charlotte de Lange et al. (2018). "The doctors' role in cases of suspected child abuse". Tidsskrift for den Norske Legeforening. 138 (2): 126–128.
