= Time delay cosmography =

Cosmological distance measurement method

In astrophysics, time delay cosmography measures cosmological distances by analysis of time delays between multiple images of distant galaxies viewed by gravitational lensing. It provides a distance measurement independent of the cosmic distance ladder.

== Concept ==
The technique requires a gravitational lens, typically a massive galaxy, and an active galactic nucleus (AGN) behind the galaxy as viewed from Earth. The AGN is a compact region in a galaxy that emits vast amounts radiation that varies in time, creating a light curve. Monitoring the light curve from multiple images of the same AGN viewed through the lens every few days for years allows the time delays computed. These time delays plus estimates of the mass of the lens can be analyzed to extract parameters for the expansion of the universe especially the Hubble constant. The time delays are on the order of months.

== History ==
The idea that a gravitational lens could be used to measure cosmological distances to supernova and thus infer the Hubble constant was first proposed by Sjur Refsdal in 1964. Multiple supernova were only successfully imaged in 2014 with the first strongly lensed supernova to be discovered named SN Refsdal. Before that the discovery of quasars and then AGNs provided alternative means accomplish the measurements. Lensed quasars were studied in the 1980s and 1990s with large scale studies of AGNs beginning in the first decade of the 2000s.

Initial efforts failed due to systematic errors and the difficulty of estimated the mass of the lens. Modern measurements require both a long time base of solid data and sophisticated modeling of the lensing effect.

== Ongoing efforts ==
While measurements of supernova have been rare, they have technical advantages as sources for time delay measurement: their light curves can be modeled accurately and when the nova fades the imaged area can be used for background subtraction. New telescopes such as Vera C. Rubin Observatory are expected to discover ~10 lensed SNe in the first three years of observation.
