= Ivar Giaever =

Norwegian–American physicist (1929–2025)

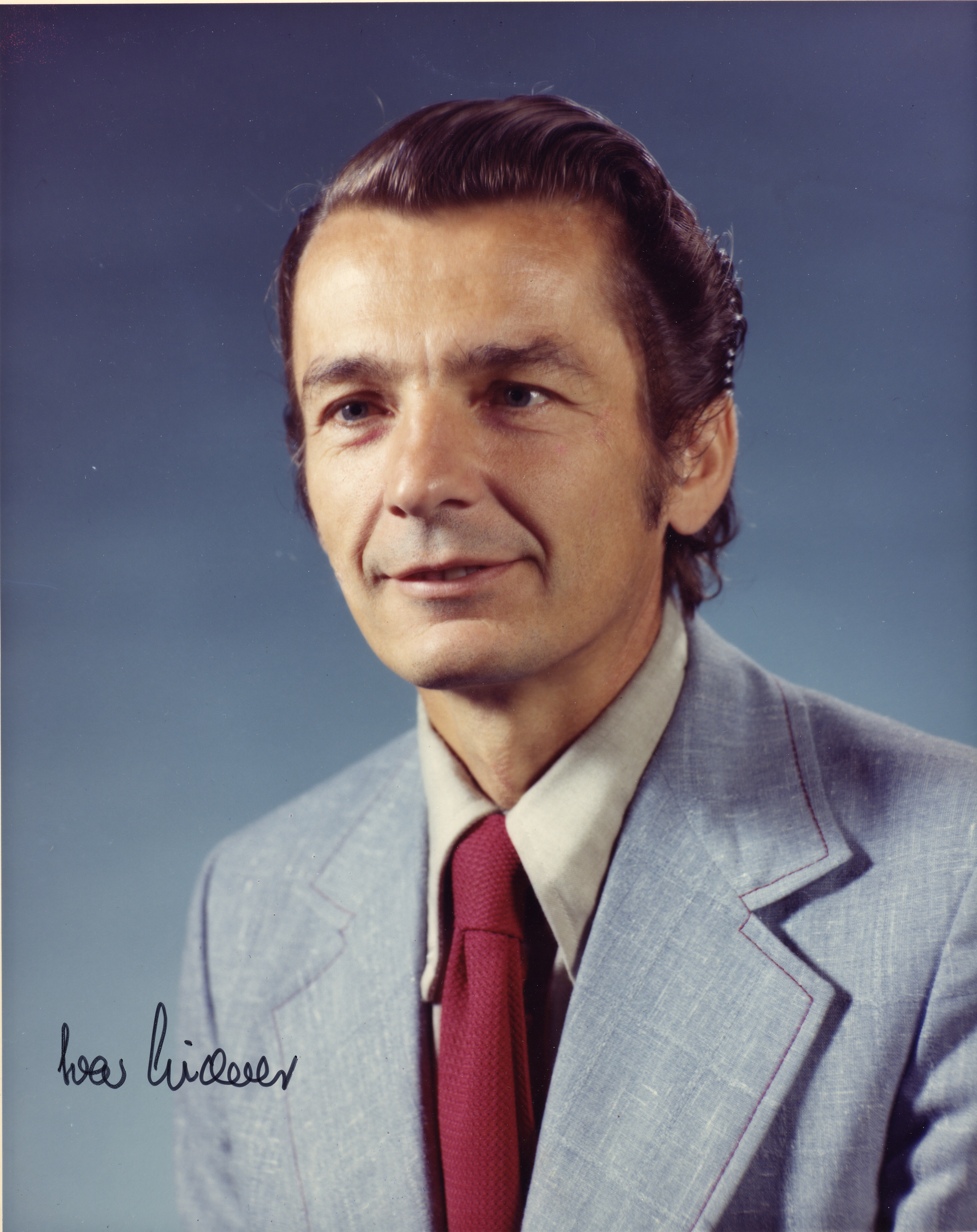
- Giaever in 1973
- Born: Ivar Giæver; April 5, 1929; Bergen, Norway
- Died: June 20, 2025 (aged 96); Schenectady, New York, U.S.
- Citizenship: Norway; United States (nat. 1964)
- Education: Norwegian Institute of Technology: Siv.ing., Mechanical Engineering; Rensselaer Polytechnic Institute: Ph.D., Theoretical Physics
- Known for: Tunneling in superconductors
- Spouse: Inger Skramstad (m. 1952; died 2023)
- Children: 4
- Awards: Oliver E. Buckley Prize (1965); Nobel Prize in Physics (1973); Onsager Medal (2003); Gunnerus Medal (2010)
- Scientific career
- Fields: Physics
- Workplaces: Canadian General Electric; General Electric Research Laboratory; Rensselaer Polytechnic Institute
- Thesis: The Conductivity and the Hall Effect in Binary Alloys (1964)
- Doctoral advisor: Hillard Bell Huntington

Ivar Giaever (Note: /ˈjeɪvər/ YAY-ver; Norwegian: Giæver, pronounced [ˈjæːvər]) (April 5, 1929 – June 20, 2025) was a Norwegian–American physicist who shared the 1973 Nobel Prize in Physics with Leo Esaki and Brian Josephson. One half of the prize was jointly awarded to Esaki and Giaever "for their experimental discoveries regarding tunneling phenomena in semiconductors and superconductors, respectively."

== Biography ==
Ivar Giaever was born on April 5, 1929, in Bergen, Norway, the second of three children of John A. Giaever, a pharmacist. He grew up in Toten, where he attended elementary school, before moving to Hamar to receive his secondary education. In 1948, Giaever entered the Norwegian Institute of Technology (now part of the Norwegian University of Science and Technology), where he graduated in 1952 with a degree in Mechanical Engineering. In 1953, he completed his military service in the Norwegian Army, before going on to work for the Norwegian Patent Office as a patent examiner.

In 1954, Giaever emigrated to Canada to join the Advanced Engineering Program of Canadian General Electric. He then moved to the United States in 1956, and worked as an applied mathematician for General Electric until 1958, when he became a researcher at the General Electric Research Laboratory.

In 1964, Giaever received a Doctor of Philosophy in Theoretical Physics from Rensselaer Polytechnic Institute, where he was an Institute Professor from 1988 until his retirement in 2004. He was also a professor at the University of Oslo, sponsored by Statoil.

Giaever died on June 20, 2025, in Schenectady, New York, at the age of 96. He is buried in the cemetery of Hoff Church in Østre Toten, Norway.

== Research ==
=== Tunneling ===
From 1958 to 1969, Giaever worked on thin films, tunneling, and superconductivity. In 1960, following from Leo Esaki's discovery of tunneling in semiconductors in 1957, Giaever showed that tunneling also took place in superconductors, demonstrating tunneling through a very thin layer of oxide surrounded on both sides by metal in a superconducting or normal state. His experiments demonstrated the existence of an energy gap in superconductors, one of the most important predictions of the BCS theory of superconductivity, which had been developed in 1957. (Note: Bardeen, Cooper, and Schrieffer won the Nobel Prize in Physics in 1972 for this theoretical advance, which bears their initials.) Giaever's experimental demonstration of tunneling in superconductors stimulated the theoretical physicist Brian Josephson to work on the phenomenon, leading to his prediction of the Josephson effect in 1962. Esaki and Giaever shared half of the 1973 Nobel Prize in Physics, and Josephson received the other half.

=== Biophysics ===
Giaever's research later in his career was mainly in the field of biophysics. In 1969, he was awarded a Guggenheim Fellowship to study biophysics for one year at the University of Cambridge in England. In 1991, Giaever and Charles R. Keese (who worked with Giaever at GE) founded Applied BioPhysics Inc., a company that develops and markets electric cell-substrate impedance sensing.

== Activism ==
Giaever was a climate change denier, who fueled doubt on climate change, for example calling it a "new religion." However, he had presented no strong evidence to support this position. On September 13, 2011, he resigned from the American Physical Society, after the organization called the evidence of damaging global warming "incontrovertible."

Giaever was a science advisor to the Heartland Institute, an American conservative and libertarian think tank that denies climate change.

Giaever co-signed a letter from over 70 Nobel laureate scientists to the Louisiana State Legislature supporting the repeal of the anti-evolution Louisiana Science Education Act.

== Personal life ==
In 1952, Giaever married his childhood sweetheart, Inger Skramstad, who died on September 12, 2023, at the age of 94. They had four children.

In 1964, Giaever became a naturalized U.S. citizen.

Giaever was an atheist.

== Recognition ==
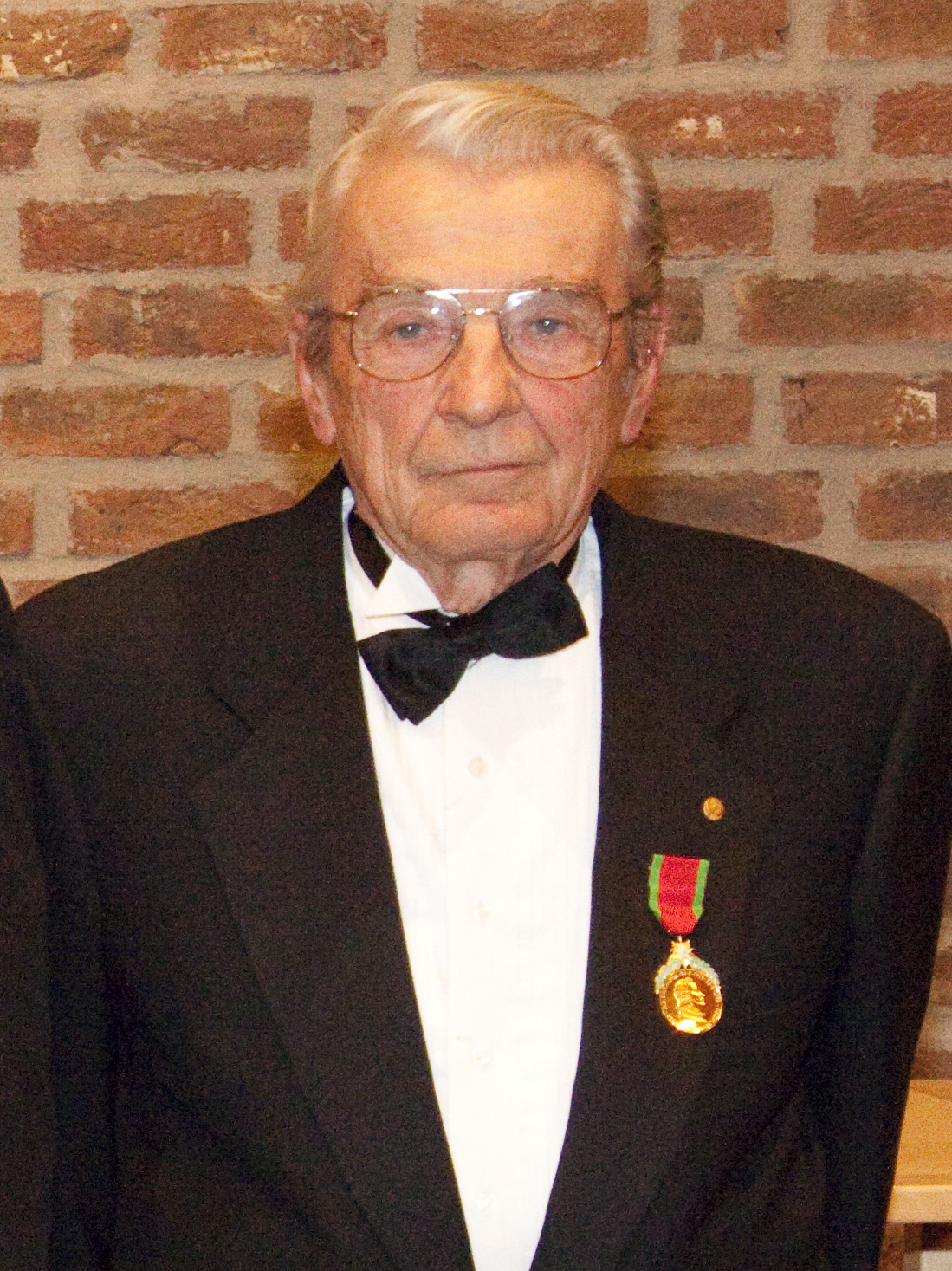
Giaever at the awards ceremony for the Gunnerus Medal, 2010.

=== Memberships ===
Year	Organization	Type	Ref.
1962	American Physical Society	Fellow	
1974	National Academy of Sciences	Member	
1975	National Academy of Engineering	Member	

=== Awards ===
Year	Organization	Award	Co-recipients	Citation	Ref.
1965	American Physical Society	Oliver E. Buckley Prize	—	"For being first to use electron tunneling in the study of the energy gap in super-conductors and for demonstrating the power of this technique."	
1973	Royal Swedish Academy of Sciences	Nobel Prize in Physics	Leo Esaki and Brian Josephson	"For their experimental discoveries regarding tunneling phenomena in semiconductors and superconductors, respectively."	
2003	Norwegian University of Science and Technology	Onsager Medal	—	—	
2010	Royal Norwegian Society of Sciences and Letters	Gunnerus Medal	—	—	

=== Honorary degrees ===
Year	University	Degree	Ref.
1985	Norwegian Institute of Technology	—	

== Publications ==
- Giaever, Ivar (1960). "Electron Tunneling Between Two Superconductors". Physical Review Letters. 5 (10): 464–466. Bibcode:1960PhRvL...5..464G. doi:10.1103/PhysRevLett.5.464.
- Giaever, Ivar (1974). "Electron tunneling and superconductivity". Reviews of Modern Physics. 46 (2): 245–250. Bibcode:1974RvMP...46..245G. doi:10.1103/RevModPhys.46.245.
