= Olav Smidsrød =

Norwegian biochemist (1936–2017)

Olav Aasmund Smidsrød (9 November 1936 – 29 January 2017) was a Norwegian biochemist.

He was born in Sem. He took the siv.ing. degree in 1961 and the dr.ing. degree in 1971 at the Norwegian Institute of Technology, and was a professor at the University of Trondheim from 1977, later the Norwegian University of Science and Technology. He is known for his work with polymers, particularly heteropolysaccharides. In 2008 he was awarded the Gunnerus Medal. He is a fellow of the Norwegian Academy of Science and Letters and the Norwegian Academy of Technological Sciences.

Awards
Preceded by John Birks; John Gray	Recipient of the Fridtjof Nansen Excellent Research Award in Science; 2000 (with Kjell B. Døving)	Succeeded by Sjur Refsdal; Jon Storm-Mathisen
