= Eivind Hiis Hauge =

Norwegian physicist (born 1937)

- Born: November 15, 1937 (age 88); Bergen
- Occupation: Physicist
- Awards: Commander of the Royal Norwegian Order of St. Olav

Eivind Hiis Hauge (born 15 November 1937) is a Norwegian physicist.

== Early life and career ==
Hauge was born in Bergen, but took his secondary education at Oslo Cathedral School. He then took the siv.ing. degree, graduating from the Norwegian Institute of Technology in 1962 and took the dr.techn. degree in 1965. He spent the years 1965 to 1967 as a research fellow at Rockefeller University. He was a professor of theoretical physics at the Norwegian Institute of Technology from 1976.

In 2001, having been dean of the Faculty of Information Technology, Mathematics and Electrical Engineering, he ran for election as rector of the Norwegian University of Science and Technology, the successor of the Institute of Technology. He chose Julie Feilberg as his vice rector candidate, and they edged out the other candidates Kathrine Skretting and Ingvald Strømmen. He assumed the rector chair in 2002. In the summer of 2005 his period ended, and he was succeeded by Torbjørn Digernes.

He has been the chair of Trondheim Symphony Orchestra and the Trondheim Soloists, and a board member of the Nansen Academy. He is a member the Norwegian Academy of Technological Sciences. In 2006 he was decorated as a Commander of the Royal Norwegian Order of St. Olav.

Academic offices
| Preceded by Emil Spjøtvoll | Rector of the Norwegian University of Science and Technology; 2002–2005 | Succeeded by Torbjørn Digernes |
