= Kjell Egil Eimhjellen =

Norwegian microbiologist (1928–2023)

Kjell Egil Eimhjellen (20 October 1928 – 23 July 2023) was a Norwegian microbiologist.

Eimhjellen took the siv.ing. degree at the Norwegian Institute of Technology in 1953, and studied at Stanford University from 1957 to 1959. From 1960 to 1996 he worked at the Norwegian Institute of Technology, except for stays at the Woods Hole Oceanographic Institution from 1969 to 1970 and 1980 to 1981. He started as a lecturer, but was promoted to professor. He was dean of the Department of Chemistry from 1975 to 1977, and deputy rector of the university from 1984 to 1990, under rector Dag Kavlie.

Eimhjellen was a member of the Norwegian Academy of Science and Letters, the Royal Norwegian Society of Sciences and Letters and the Norwegian Academy of Technological Sciences.

Kjell Eimhjellen resided in Ranheim. He died on 23 July 2023, at the age of 94.
