= Peder Borgen =

Norwegian Methodist minister (1928–2023)

Peder Johan Borgen (26 January 1928 – 8 April 2023) was a Norwegian Methodist minister, had a Doctorate in Theology, and was a professor at Norwegian University of Science and Technology. He was considered a pioneer "within the theological scientific community in Norway and was the first Methodist and the first member of a Norwegian free church who took their theological doctorate at a Norwegian university."

== Life and career ==
Peder Johan Borgen was born in Lillestrøm on 26 January 1928. He grew up with a background in both the Inner Mission and the Methodist Church, and was Candidatus theologiæ at the University of Oslo 1953. In 1956 he earned a Ph.D. at Drew University, Madison, New Jersey, USA and then his Doctorate of Theology at the University of Oslo in 1966. He was a Methodist priest in Harstad 1956–1958, research fellow from 1958 to 1962 and professor at Wesley Theological Seminary in Washington from 1962. In 1967 he became associate professor at the University of Bergen. In 1973 he was appointed professor at the University of Trondheim specializing in the New Testament and religion of the Greco-Roman world. From 1994 to 1997 he was a senior researcher on the Research Council. After retirement, he settled in Lillestrøm.

Borgen researched the Dead Sea Scrolls and, from 1995, was a member of the Board of Advisors of The Dead Sea Scrolls' Foundation. His popular scientific writings included the theology and history of the Sami. He was also present at the first Nordic-Sami meeting that was held at Trondheim Methodist church in 1917.

Borgen was a Knight of the Order of St. Olav in 1998 and Member of the academy and of the Royal Vetenskapssamhället, Uppsala. Borgen was assistant rector at AVH 1984 to 1987, president of the Royal Norwegian Society of Sciences and Letters from 1996 to 1999 and President of the International Fellowship of New Testament studies from 1998 to 1999. During the period 1986 to 1991 he was part of the World Methodist Council and from 1973 to 1993 he was a member of the European Methodist Theological Commission. Borgen was also a member of the theological dialogue commission appointed by the World Methodist Council and the Lutheran World Federation.

"In 2003 he was awarded the Gunnerus Medal, which is the highest honour given by The Royal Norwegian Society of Sciences and Letters." He was also a fellow of the Norwegian Academy of Science and Letters.

Borgen died on 8 April 2023, at the age of 95.

== Bibliography ==
- Bread from Heaven: An Exegetical Study of the Concept of Manna in the Gospel of John and the Writings of Philo (1965, 1981)
- Logos was the true light, and other essays on the Gospel of John (1983)
- Paul Preaches Circumcision and Pleases Men: And Other Essays on Christian Origins (1983)
- Philo, John, and Paul: New Perspectives on Judaism and Early Christianity (1987)
- Early Christianity and Hellenistic Judaism (1996)
- The Philo Index: A Complete Greek Word Index to the Writings of Philo of Alexandria (2000)
- The Complete Works of Philo of Alexandria: A Key-word-in-context Concordance (2005)
- Way Outside of the High-Road (2009)
