= Jon Storm-Mathisen =

Norwegian neuroscientist

Jon Storm-Mathisen (born 16 January 1941 in Oslo) is a highly cited Norwegian neuroscientist known for his work on the morphology and immunocytochemistry of the central nervous system. He is a professor of medicine at the Department of Anatomy at the University of Oslo.

Storm-Mathiesen completed his examen artium at Oslo Cathedral School in 1959, graduated from the University of Oslo in 1965, and qualified as doctor of medicine from the same university in 1976. He is a member of the Norwegian Academy of Science and Letters.

Awards
Preceded by Olav Smidsrød	Recipient of the Fridtjof Nansen Excellent Research Award in Science; 2001 (with Sjur Refsdal)	Succeeded by Knut Aukland
