= Dark siren =

Gravitational wave generating event

A dark siren is a gravitational wave event without electromagnetic counterparts. They are significant as part of a method used by astronomers to establish the Hubble constant, first suggested by Bernard F. Schutz in 1986. Dark sirens are caused by mergers of two black holes or two neutron stars. The collision of two such objects creates distortions in space-time which propagate as waves through space. These events are fairly rare in the universe, and must be detected by multiple gravitational wave telescopes in order to be valuable for scientists.

A dark siren is an alternate form of a standard siren, an interstellar measurement of "loudness" of gravitational waves (analogous to sound waves). The binary black hole merger GW170814 in 2017 was used as a standard siren to measure the Hubble constant to a value of 75+40
−32 (km/s)/Mpc.
