= Tormod Førland =

Norwegian chemist (1920–1995)

- Born: 6 June 1920; Høyland, Norway
- Died: 10 November 1995 (aged 75); Trondheim, Norway
- Occupation: Chemist
- Relatives: Didrik Arup Seip (father-in-law)
- Awards: Gunnerus Medal (1991)

Tormod Ernst Dittmar Førland (6 June 1920 – 10 November 1995) was a Norwegian chemist, a researcher in inorganic and physical chemistry, and professor at the Norwegian Institute of Technology.

== Personal life ==
Førland was born in Høyland Municipality (now part of Sandnes Municipality) on 6 June 1920, a son of chemical engineer Tormod Reinert Førland and Berta Josefine Dittmar. In 1943 he married Katrine Seip, a daughter of Didrik Arup Seip.

== Career ==
Førland graduated as chemical engineer from the Norwegian Institute of Technology in 1946, and as dr. techn. in 1958. From 1947 to 1950 he attended universities in the United States, first the Carnegie Institute of Technology and then Pennsylvania State University. He was appointed as docent at the Norwegian Institute of Technology from 1959, and as professor of physical chemistry from 1963.

His research interests included oxygen ion activity, electrochemistry and irreversible thermodynamics. He was awarded the Gunnerus Medal in 1991.

== Selected works ==
- On the properties of some mixtures of fused salts. 1958. (thesis)
- Practicals in physical chemistry. With K. S. Førland and G. Ndaalio. Dar-es-Salaam. 1980.
- Irreversible Thermodynamics. Theory and Applications. With K. S. Førland and S. K. Ratkje. Chichester. 1988. ISBN 9780471917069. OCLC 16758791.
- Chemical thermodynamics. With K. S. Førland. Dar-es-Salaam. 1991.
