= Karsten Jakobsen =

Norwegian engineer (1928–2019)

- Born: 15 July 1928; Sandefjord, Norway
- Died: 8 January 2019 (aged 90)
- Occupation: Engineer
- Known for: Rector (1990–1993) at the Norwegian Institute of Technology
- Awards: Order of St. Olav (2002); Gunnerus Medal (2011)

Karsten Jakobsen (15 July 1928 – 8 January 2019) was a Norwegian engineer. He was a professor and rector (1990–1993) at the Norwegian Institute of Technology, and was the first rector of the Norwegian University of Science and Technology in 1996.

== Career ==
Jakobsen was born in Sandefjord. He graduated as dr.ing. from the Norwegian Institute of Technology, and was appointed professor in mechanical engineering at the Norwegian Institute of Technology in 1982. He was decorated Knight of the Order of St. Olav in 2002. He was awarded the Gunnerus Medal in 2011.

Academic offices
Preceded by Dag Kavlie	Rector of the Norwegian Institute of Technology; 1990–1993	Succeeded by Emil Spjøtvoll
