= Sjur Refsdal =

Norwegian astrophysicist (1935–2009)

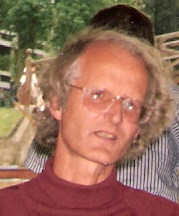
Sjur Refsdal, Cambridge, UK, 1987

Sjur Refsdal (30 December 1935 – 29 January 2009) was a Norwegian astrophysicist, born in Oslo. He is best known for his pioneer work on gravitational lensing, including the Chang-Refsdal lens.

== Biography ==
In 1964 and 1966 he published a series of articles on the effects and possible applications of gravitational lenses. In 1970 he earned a doctorate at the Institute of Theoretical Astrophysics, University of Oslo. Later that year he became professor in astrophysics at the Hamburg Observatory in Germany, and remained in that position until he retired in 2001.

He later started work on stellar evolution, but returned to gravitational lensing shortly before the first detection of a gravitational lens, dubbed the Twin Quasar. He was a member of the Norwegian Academy of Science and Emeritus at the Institute for theoretical Astrophysics at the University of Oslo. On 16 February 2005, he was awarded the King's Medal of Merit in Gold.

He is particularly known for the "Refsdal Method", which describes how one may estimate the expansion rate of the Universe (Hubble constant) using the measured time-delay and lens properties of a gravitationally lensed supernova (SN). This method was applied for the first time in 2018, with the homonymous SN Refsdal, nicknamed in his honor.

Awards
Preceded by Olav Smidsrød	Recipient of the Fridtjof Nansen Excellent Research Award in Science; 2001 (with Jon Storm-Mathisen)	Succeeded by Knut Aukland
