= Emil Spjøtvoll =

Norwegian mathematician (1940–2002)

Emil Oskar Spjøtvoll (21 July 1940 – 4 March 2002) was a Norwegian mathematician and statistician.

== Early life ==
Spjøtvoll was born in Hemne Municipality. He finished his secondary education in 1959 at Trondheim Cathedral School, took the cand.mag. degree at the University of Oslo in 1962 and then the cand.real. degree in 1964. Spjøtvoll lectured at the university from 1965 to 1968, and in 1968 he took the dr.philos. degree with the thesis A Mixed Model in the Analysis of Variance. Optimal Properties.

== Career ==
He was a guest scholar at University of California, Berkeley and the University of Wisconsin, Madison from 1968 to 1970, then docent at the University of Oslo. From 1973 to 1983 he was a professor at the Norwegian College of Agriculture. Spjøtvoll had guest scholarships in Paris (1980–1981) and Zürich (1982–1983).

In 1983 Spjøtvoll was hired at the Norwegian Institute of Technology. He was prorector from 1990 to 1993 and rector from 1993 to 1995. Spjøtvoll was then the first rector at the Norwegian University of Science and Technology, a post he held from 1996 until 31 December 2001. He also worked for Statistics Norway and SINTEF. Spjøtvoll was originally an opponent of the merger which led to the Norwegian University of Science and Technology, but then turned around and became a defender of the new university.

Spjøtvoll was a fellow of the Norwegian Academy of Technological Sciences from 1984, the Royal Norwegian Society of Sciences and Letters from 1985, the Norwegian Academy of Science and Letters from 1987. In 1999 he was decorated as a Commander of the Order of St. Olav.

== Personal life ==
He was married twice. He died from cancer in March 2002.

Academic offices
Preceded by Karsten Jakobsen	Rector of the Norwegian Institute of Technology; 1993–1995	Position abolished (due to a university merger)
New post	Rector of the Norwegian University of Science and Technology; 1996–2001	Succeeded by Eivind Hiis Hauge
