= Jens Glad Balchen =

Norwegian civil engineer (1926–2009)

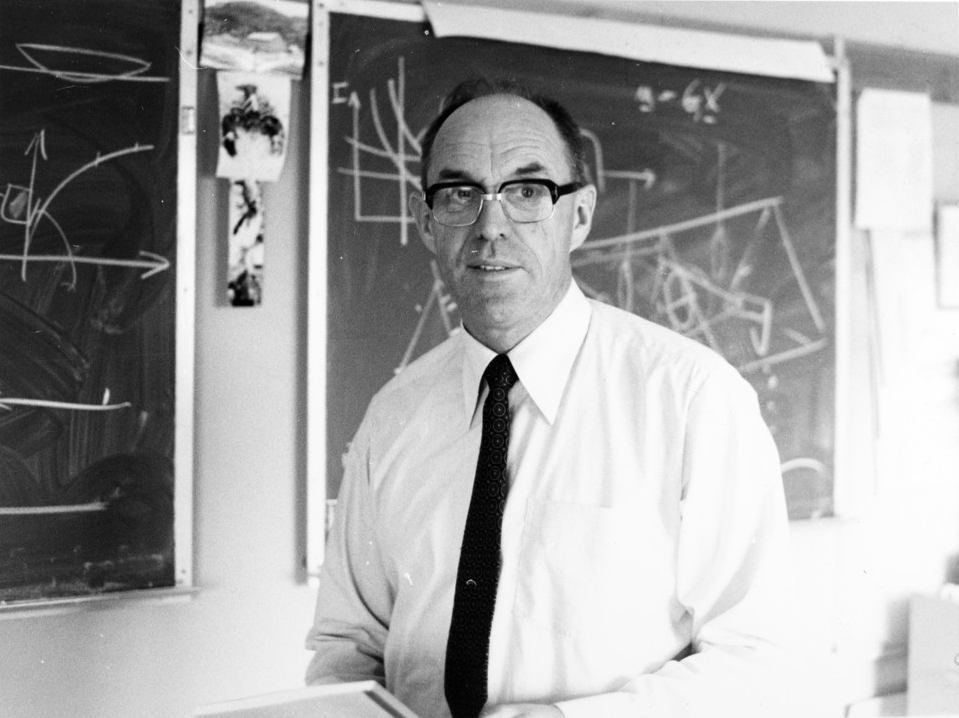
- Born: 20 April 1926; Kristiansand, Norway
- Died: 12 April 2009 (aged 82); Trondheim, Norway
- Occupation: professor of cybernetics

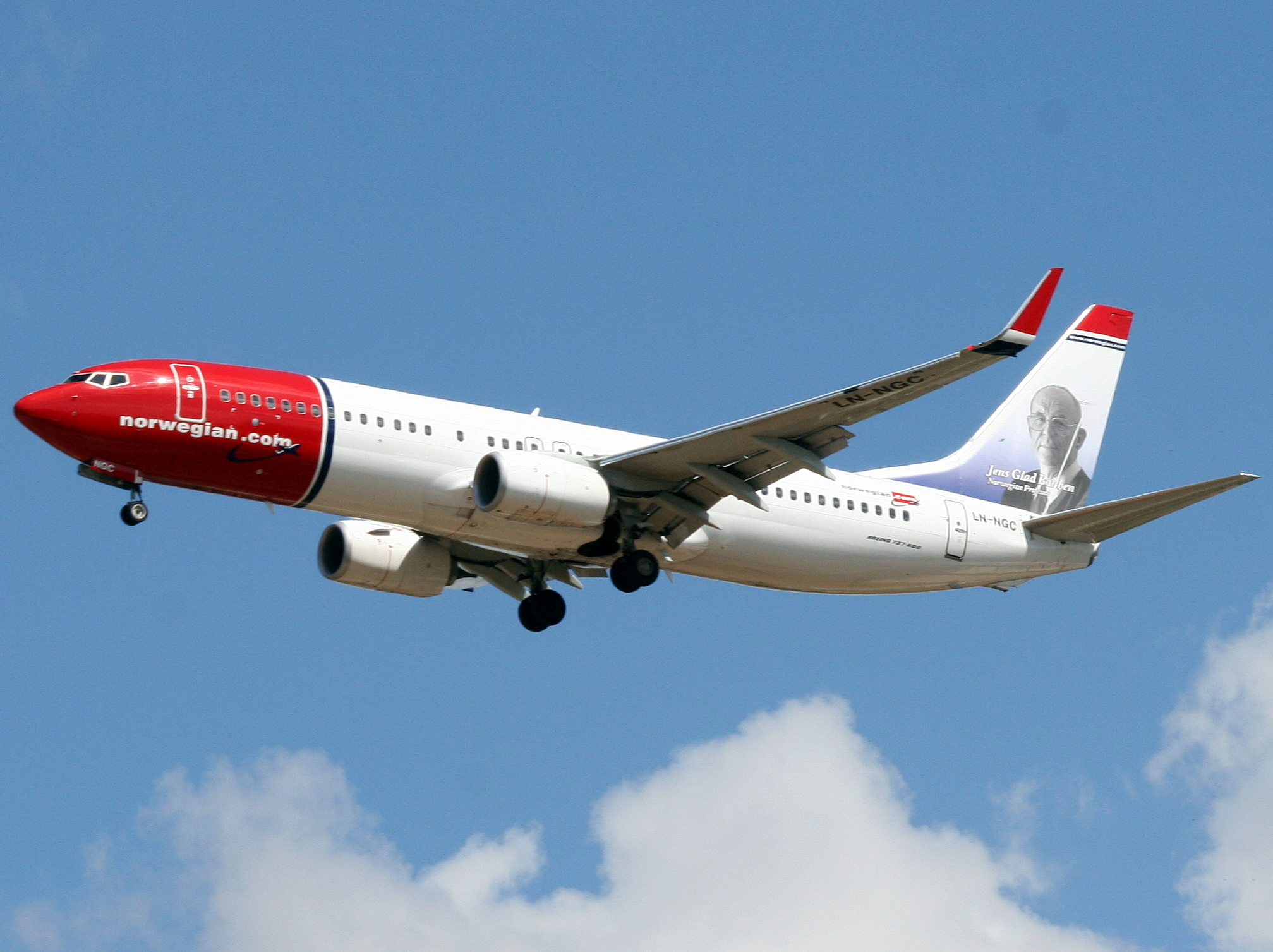
Jens Glad Balchen commemorated on the tail of a Norwegian Air Shuttle Boeing 737-800

Jens Glad Balchen (20 April 1926 – 12 April 2009) was a Norwegian engineer. He was born in Kristiansand and graduated from the Norwegian Institute of Technology and the Yale University. He was appointed professor of cybernetics at the Norwegian Institute of Technology from 1962. His research included projects in medicine, on aquaculture and on dynamic positioning of ships and platforms. He was decorated Commander of the Order of St. Olav in 1996.
