= NordForsk =

Organisation under the Nordic Council of Ministers

NordForsk is an organization under the Nordic Council of Ministers that facilitates and funds Nordic research cooperation. Established in 2005, it aims to strengthen the research capabilities of the Nordic region by fostering collaboration across national borders in Denmark, Finland, Iceland, Norway, Sweden, and the autonomous regions of the Faroe Islands, Greenland, and Åland. NordForsk focuses on creating synergies between national research policies, funding agencies, and researchers to address shared challenges and advance the competitiveness of the Nordic region in the global knowledge economy. By funding and managing research initiatives, NordForsk brings together national environments and ensures the highest quality research. The NordForsk Board, appointed by the Nordic Council of Ministers, holds overall responsibility for the organization's operations, including its strategy, budget, and personnel policy. It comprises representatives from the largest national research funding agencies in Denmark, Finland, Iceland, Norway, Sweden, and the Faroe Islands, along with a representative from the Nordic University Association (NUS). Observers from Greenland, Åland, and the Nordic Council of Ministers also participate. The chairmanship rotates among the board members, ensuring shared leadership within the organization.

== Mission and objectives ==
Nordic cooperation is based on the beliefs that working together makes the Nordic region stronger, and that collective accomplishments will benefit not just the people living in the Nordic region but also the rest of the globe. Here, NordForsk aims to be an effective facilitator of Nordic research co-operation based on scientific quality, efficiency and trust. In addition, this co-operation is also expected to generate Nordic added value. Activities that manifest and develop a sense of Nordic community; activities that increase Nordic competence and competitiveness; activities that strengthen the Nordic international influence; and activities that foster equal and balanced social, economic, and environmental interaction in the Nordic region are examples of activities that have Nordic added value. These activities are similar to those that could be undertaken at the national level but produce concretely positive effects through common Nordic solutions.

== Funding and collaboration ==
NordForsk is financed through contributions from national research funding agencies and institutions in the Nordic countries, along with funding from the Nordic Council of Ministers. It allocates funds to research projects, networks, and infrastructure that have strategic importance for the Nordic region. Projects funded by NordForsk often focus on issues of common interest, such as health, welfare, digitalization, the environment, climate change, and societal security.

Collaboration is a core principle of NordForsk’s operations. It works closely with other organizations, such as the Nordic Innovation and Nordic Energy Research, to foster a comprehensive approach to research and innovation in the region. NordForsk also collaborates with other international research institutions and networks to enhance the impact of Nordic research.

== Call and funding process ==
NordForsk funds research by issuing calls developed in cooperation with national research funding organizations, primarily through the Open Invitation mechanism. Each proposal must be supported by the research councils from at least three Nordic countries. The NordForsk Board makes the final decision, with national funders providing 2/3 of the total budget and NordForsk adding 1/3 to the total.

A committee reviews applications, considering international expert assessments, Nordic added value, and strategic relevance.

Funding models:

1. Real common pot: All funding is pooled and allocated to the best proposals, regardless of the contributing country. Researchers from all Nordic countries can receive funding, but only co-funding countries can act as project owners. The NordForsk Board makes the final funding decisions and oversees the projects.
2. Virtual common pot: National funders finance their participants directly, with NordForsk funding filling any gaps. Only researchers from co-funding countries can receive support. National funders manage applications from their countries and monitor project progress.
