= Knut Aukland =

Norwegian physiologist

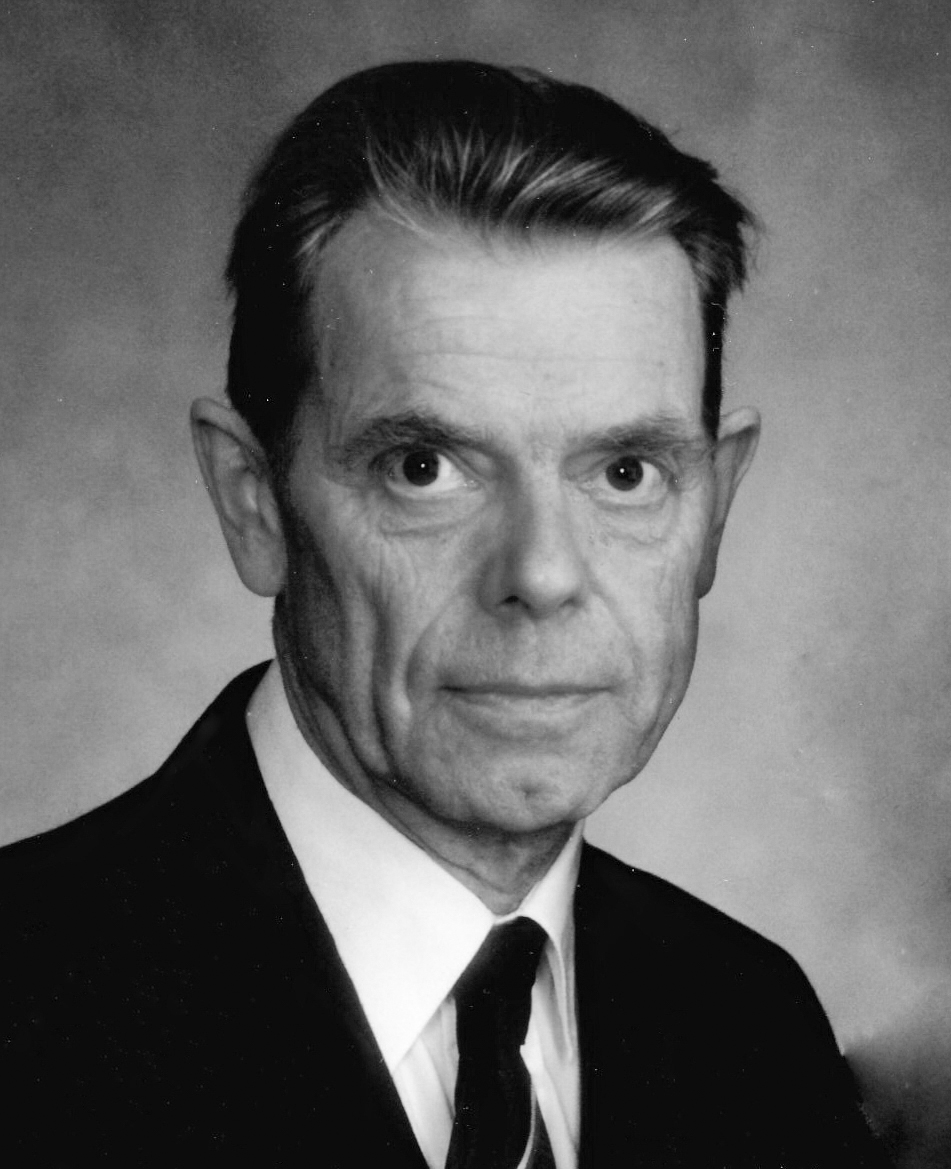
- Born: 28 March 1929; Vigmostad, Norway
- Died: 24 January 2014 (aged 84); Storetveit, Norway
- Resting place: Storetveit Cemetery
- Education: University of Bergen
- Occupation: Physiologist
- Awards: Fridtjof Nansen Award of Excellence, 2002

Knut Aukland (28 March 1929 – 24 January 2014) was a Norwegian physiologist. He made significant contributions to renal physiology, particularly in fields of renal blood flow measurement and regulation and transcapillary fluid balance, through his studies of blood circulation in the kidneys.

== Education ==
Aukland finished his secondary in Mandal in 1948 and took the Candidate of Medicine degree at the University of Bergen in 1954.

== Medical career ==
Knut Aukland began his career as a research fellow at Ullevål Hospital in 1958, and was a researcher the rest of his career, except for a year as a physician from 1961 to 1962. He then worked at the National Institute of Health in Bethesda, Maryland. Back in Norway he took the Doctor Medicinae degree in 1965 with the thesis Studies on intrarenal circulation with special reference to gas exchange.

Aukland was a professor at the University of Bergen from 1970. He became an honorary member of the American Physiological Society in 1982, fellow of the Norwegian Academy of Science and Letters from 1986 and won the Fridtjof Nansen Excellent Research Award in Science in 2002.

== Publications ==
- Renal oxygen tension (sm.m. J. Krog), i Nature, vol. 188, London 1960, p. 671
- Renal sodium transport and oxygen consumption (sm.m. F. Kiil og H. Refsum), i American Journal of Physiology,vol. 201, Bethesda 1961, pp. 511–516
- Measurement of local blood flow with hydrogen gas (sm.m. B. F. Bower og R. W. Berliner), i Circulation Research, vol. 14, Hagerstown 1964, pp. 164–187
- Studies on intrarenal circulation with special reference to gas exchange, PhD UiO, 1965
- Tubular salt and water transport in hydrated dogs studied with push-flow technique 1966
- Effect of adrenaline, noradrenaline, angiotensin and renal nerve stimulation on intrarenal distribution of blood flow in dogs, i Acta Physiologica Scandinavica, vol. 72, Stockholm 1968, p. 498–509
- Protein concentration of interstitial fluid collected from rat skin by a wick method (sm.m. H. O. Fadnes), ibid. vol. 88, Stockholm 1973, pp. 350–358
- A colloid osmometer for small fluid samples (sm.m. H. M. Johnsen), ibid. vol. 90, Stockholm 1974, pp. 485–490
- Effect of L-NAME on glomerular filtration rate in deep and superficial layers of rat kidneys 1997
- Micropuncture measurement of interstitial fluid pressure in rat subcutis and skeletal muscle: Comparison to wick-in-needle technique (sm.m. H. Wiig og R. K. Reed), i Microvascular Research, vol. 21, New York, 1981, pp. 308–319
- Skimming of microspheres in vitro: implications for measurement of intrarenal blood flow 1981
- Interstitial fluid volume: local regulatory mechanisms., (sm.m. G. Nicolaysen), i Physiolological Reviews, vol. 61, Baltimore 1981, pp. 556–643
- Protein concentration of lymph and interstitial fluid in the rat tail 1984
- Hemodynamics and interstitial fluid pressure in the rat tail 1984
- Renal autoregulation: models combining tubuloglomerular feedback and myogenic response 1987
- Measurement of interstitial fluid pressure in dogs: evaluation of methods 1987
- Distribution volumes and macromolecular mobility in rat tail tendon interstitium 1991
- Interstitial-lymphatic mechanisms in the control of extracellular fluid volume (sm.m. R. K. Reed), ibid. vol 73, Baltimore 1993, pp. 1–78
- Repeatable measurement of local and zonal GFR in the rat kidney with aprotinin (sm.m. O. Tenstad og H. E. Williamson), i Acta Physiologica Scandinavica, vol. 152, London 1994, pp. 21–31
- Renal cortical interstitium and fluid absorption by peritubular capillaries 1994
- Autoregulation of zonal glomerular filtration rate and renal blood flow in spontaneously hypertensive rats 1995
- Interstitial exclusion of macromolecules studied by graded centrifugation of rat tail tendon 1997
- Distribution spaces for hyaluronan and albumin in rat tail tendons 2001
- Isolation of interstitial fluid from rat mammary tumors by a centrifugation method 2002
- Odd E. Hanssen and the Hanssen method for measurement of single-nephron glomerular filtration rate UiB, Bergen 2001

Awards
Preceded by Jon Storm-Mathisen; Sjur Refsdal	Recipient of the Fridtjof Nansen Excellent Research Award in Science; 2002	Succeeded by Per Brandtzæg
