= Johannes Moe =

Norwegian engineer and research administrator (1926–2023)

- Born: 24 April 1926; Modalen Municipality, Norway
- Died: 19 September 2023 (aged 97)
- Occupation: Engineer
- Awards: Order of St. Olav

Johannes Moe (24 April 1926 – 19 September 2023) was a Norwegian engineer and research administrator.

== Biography ==
Johannes Moe was born in Modalen Municipality on 24 April 1926. He graduated from the Norwegian Institute of Technology in 1952. Moe was appointed professor at the Norwegian Institute of Technology from 1962 to 1976, and from 1972 to 1976 he served as rector of the institute. From 1977 to 1989, he was appointed director of SINTEF. He was the president of the Norwegian Academy of Technological Sciences from 1993 to 1999. He was decorated Commander of the Order of St. Olav in 1976.

Moe was elected a member of the National Academy of Engineering in 1977 for contributions to structural analyses and optimization with applications to wood and concrete construction and to ship and shell structures.

Moe died on 19 September 2023, at the age of 97.
