= Sivilingeniør =

Engineering title in Norway

Sivilingeniør (transl. 'civilian engineer'; abbreviated siv. ing.) is a legally protected engineering title awarded by technical universities in Norway. To qualify for the title, a student must follow a structured study programme in technology and natural sciences of 5 years duration (4.5 years before 2002) at a Norwegian university or university college. Previously it was also a degree in and of itself, though today it is the equivalent of a Master of Science or Master of Technology degree. Before 1992, it was considered by the Norwegian Institute of Technology (NTH) to be equivalent to a Master of Science degree. Although the name is cognate with the English term civil engineer, the meanings do not correspond in modern usage.

The title was not awarded in 2002, when the study program's length was expanded by six months, instead the title Master of Technology was used. This changed in 2003 after criticism from Norwegian universities. Since 2003 the title Sivilingeniør has been used in addition to the title Master of Technology. In 2016 regulations were clarified and today specify that any Norwegian educational institution awarding master in technological subjects may use the title sivilingeniør as well as Master of Science or Master of Technology.

== Education ==
Today the title sivilingeniør is awarded to students who either fulfill a structured five-year program in technology and natural sciences, or who take a three-year Bachelor engineering program at a university college and then transfer to the Master's programs two last year at an applicable institution. The degree is equivalent to a Master of Science, if the degree is awarded from the Norwegian University of Science and Technology (NTNU). Other institutions typically award the title Master of Technology.

Most regional colleges offer engineering, though which programs are offered may vary. The Master's programs are primarily offered at the Norwegian University of Science and Technology (NTNU), the Norwegian University of Life Sciences (NMBU), the University of Bergen (UiB), the University of Stavanger (UiS), the University of Tromsø (UiT), and the University of Agder (UiA), though some regional colleges also offer Master's programs. The references to Bachelor and Master level degrees refer to the definition of the degrees given in the Bologna Framework.

== History ==
The origin of the phrase Civil Engineer stems from the need to differentiate between a military engineer and a civilian engineer.

Traditionally only the Norwegian Institute of Technology (now part of NTNU) was allowed to educate sivilingeniørs in Norway. Until the 2002 Quality Reform that implemented the Bologna process, the education took 4.5 years, but was then changed to five years and the graduates are now awarded a master's degree according to the Bologna Framework, in addition to the title Sivilingeniør.
