= List of rallycross drivers =

This is a list of notable current and former rallycross drivers, many of whom have competed or are competing in the European Rallycross Championship.

== Drivers ==
Driver	International Titles
(Brazil) Átila Abreu	
(United Kingdom) Tom Airey	
(Finland) Matti Alamäki	ERC GT Division (1981), Division 2 (1985, 1988, 1989, 1990)
(Netherlands) André Albers	
(Portugal) Filipe Albuquerque	
(Sweden) Per-Gunnar Andersson	
(United Kingdom) Colin Anson	
(Sweden) Olle Arnesson	
(Canada) Steve Arpin	
(Germany) Mandie August	
(Norway) Andreas Bakkerud	ERC Super1600s (2011, 2012)
(Austria) Manfred Beck	ERC 1400 Cup (1996)
(United States) Townsend Bell	
(France) Eddy Bénézet	ERC Division 2 (2000)
(Austria) Andy Bentza	
(Sweden) Susann Bergvall	ERC 1400 Cup (1994)
(Norway) Morten Bergminrud	
(United Kingdom) David Binks	
(United States) Ken Block	
(Sweden) Stig Blomqvist	
(Norway) Knut Ove Børseth	ERC Division 2 (2009)
(France) Olivier Bossard	
(Norway) Anders Bråten	
(Austria) Herbert Breiteneder	
(Canada) Richard Burton	
(United Kingdom) John Button	
(Spain) Ferran Cañadó	
(Czech Republic) Roman Častoral	ERC Division (2006)
(Czech Republic) Zdeněk Čermák	
(Canada) Patrick Carpentier	
(United Kingdom) Phil Chicken	
(Canada) Andrew Comrie-Picard	
(Netherlands) Wout Couwenberg	
(Germany) Ronny C'Rock	
(Sweden) Alx Danielsson	
(United States) Brian Deegan	X Games (2011)
(United States) Mitchell DeJong	Global RX Lites (2014)
(Belgium) Michaël De Keersmaecker	ERC Division 1A (2007)
(United Kingdom) Liam Doran	
(United Kingdom) Pat Doran	
(Belgium) Marc Duez	
(Belgium) François Duval	
(Sweden) Per Eklund	ERC Division 1 (1999)
(United Kingdom) Vic Elford	
(Netherlands) Jos Fassbender	
(Colombia) Alejo Fernandez	
(Iceland) Viðar Finnsson	
(United States) Tanner Foust	Global RX (2011, 2012), X Games (2010)
(Italy) Gigi Galli	
(United Kingdom) Rob Gibson	
(New Zealand) Emma Gilmour	
(United Kingdom) Julian Godfrey	
(United Kingdom) Will Gollop	ERC Division 2 (1992)
(Sweden) Richard Göransson	
(United Kingdom) Rodney Green	
(Poland) Krzysztof Groblewski	ERC Division 1A (2006)
(Finland) Marcus Grönholm	
(Finland) Niclas Grönholm	
(France) Jérôme Grosset-Janin	
(Austria) Herbert Grünsteidl	
(Poland) Arkadiusz Gruszka	
(Norway) Ole Håbjørg	
(Sweden) Kenneth Hansen	ERC Division 1 (1989, 1990, 1991, 1992, 1998, 2000, 2001, 2002, 2003, 2004, 2005, 2008), Division 2 (1994, 1996)
(Sweden) Kevin Hansen	ERC JRX Cup (2012, 2013)
(Sweden) Timmy Hansen	
(Hungary) Zoltán Harsányi	
(Finland) Toomas Heikkinen	Global RX (2013), X Games (2013)
(United States) Colton Herta	
(United Kingdom) David Higgins	
(Austria) Alois Höller	
(Norway) Frode Holte	
(Norway) Daniel Holten	
(Sweden) Samuel Hübinette	
(Norway) Ludvig Hunsbedt	ERC Division 1 (1993, 1997)
(United Kingdom) Richard Hutton	ERC Division 1 (1994)
(Norway) Even Hvaal	
(Norway) Sverre Isachsen	ERC Division 1 (2009, 2010), SuperCars (2011)
(France) Davy Jeanney	
(Sweden) Michael Jernberg	
(Norway) Steinar Jøranli	
(United Kingdom) Andrew Jordan	
(Czech Republic) Jaroslav Kalný	ERC 1400 Cup (1997, 1998), Division 1A (2003)
(Lebanon) Nabil Karam	
(Sweden) Ramona Karlsson	
(Netherlands) Ko Kasse	ERC 1400 Cup (1995)
(Hungary) Tamás Pál Kiss	
(Hungary) Péter Kotán	
(France) Hervé Knapick	
(Sweden) Johan Kristoffersson	
(Sweden) Tommy Kristoffersson	
(Slovenia) Valter Kobal	
(Czech Republic) Tomáš Kotek	ERC Division 2 (2007, 2008)
(Iceland) Eiríkur Kristinn Kristjánsson	
(Netherlands) Piet Kruythof	
(Italy) Jos Kuypers	
(Belgium) Tony Kuypers	ERC 1400 Cup (1993)
(Sweden) Robin Larsson	ERC Supercars (2014)
(United States) Bucky Lasek	
(Finland) Jussi-Petteri Leppihalme	
(Denmark) Ulrik Linnemann	
(France) Sébastien Loeb	X Games (2012)
(Poland) Bohdan Ludwiczak	
(Sweden) Daniel Lundh	ERC TouringCars (2014)
(Norway) Mats Lysen	ERC Division 1A (2009)
(Finland) Atro Määttä	
(Australia) Robbie Maddison	
(Poland) Andi Mancin	
(Sweden) Anton Marklund	
(Brazil) Eduardo Marques Jr.	
(United Kingdom) Kris Meeke	
(United States) Bryce Menzies	
(New Zealand) Rhys Millen	
(United States) Dave Mirra	
(Russia) Nikita Misiulia	
(United States) Patrick Moro	
(Germany) René Münnich	
(Brazil) Mauricio Neves	
(Finland) Seppo Niittymäki	
(Latvia) Reinis Nitišs	ERC Super1600s (2013)
(Sweden) Anders Norstedt	ERC Division 1 (1984, 1985, 1986)
(Republic of Ireland) Ollie O'Donovan	
(Sweden) Emil Öhman	
(Sweden) Mats Öhman	
(Estonia) Sten Oja	
(Norway) Eivind Opland	ERC Division 1 (1995, 1996), Division 2 (1997, 1998)
(Estonia) Andri Õun	
(France) Jean-Luc Pailler	ERC Division 2 (1993)
(United States) Travis Pastrana	
(Belgium) Koen Pauwels	
(Austria) Gerry Pfeiffer	
(Finland) Jussi Pinomäki	ERC Division 2 (2004, 2005), Division 1A (2008)
(Brazil) Nelson Piquet Jr.	
(United Kingdom) Kevin Procter	
(Sweden) Thomas Rådström	
(Russia) Ildar Rakhmatullin	
(Finland) Pekka Rantanen	
(Estonia) Valdur Reinsalu	
(United States) Buddy Rice	
(Netherlands) Jan de Rooy	
(Norway) Tommy Rustad	
(France) Adeline Sangnier	
(Norway) Martin Schanche	FIA European Cup (1978), ERC TC Division (1979, 1981), Division 2 (1984, 1991, 1995)
(United Kingdom) Andy Scott	
(United Kingdom) Marc Scott	
(Germany) Sven Seeliger	ERC 1400 Cup (2000, 2001)
(Canada) Kevin Sherry	
(Poland) Krzysztof Skorupski	
(Netherlands) Ron Snoeck	ERC Division 1A (2004, 2005)
(Norway) Henning Solberg	
(Norway) Petter Solberg	WRC (2014)
(United States) Scott Speed	X Games (2014)
(Austria) Günther Spindler	
(Brazil) Guilherme Spinelli	
(Norway) Egil Stenshagen	ERC Division 1 (1982, 1983)
(Finland) Teemu Suninen	
(Sweden) Gunde Svan	
(United Kingdom) John Taylor	Embassy ERC (1973)
(Netherlands) Cees Teurlings	Embassy ERC (1975)
(Russia) Timur Timerzyanov	ERC Division 1A (2010), SuperCars (2012, 2013)
(Turkey) Yigit Timur	
(Romania) Florin Tincescu	
(Republic of Ireland) Derek Tohill	ERC Division 3 (2010), TouringCars (2013)
(Iceland) Ólafur Tryggvason	
(United States) Dillon Van Way	
(Hungary) Szabolcs Végh	
(France) Stéphane Verdier	
(Iceland) Gunnar Viðarsson	
(Canada) Jacques Villeneuve	
(Netherlands) Marc-Jan Vlassak	ERC Division 2 (2002)
(Sweden) Björn Waldegård	
(Sweden) Per-Inge Walfridsson	ERC TC Division (1980)
(United States) Danny Way	
(Austria) Jürgen Weiß	
(United Kingdom) Guy Wilks	
(Finland) Joni Wiman	Global RX Lites (2013), Global RX (2014)
(Germany) Markus Winkelhock	
(Austria) Franz Wurz	Embassy ERC (1974), ERC (1976), Division 2 (1982)
(Russia) Sergej Zagumennov	ERC Super1600s (2014)
(Poland) Łukasz Zoll	
