= 1994 European Rallycross Championship =

FIA European Rallycross Championship season

Seasons
- ← 1993 1995 →

The 1994 European Rallycross Championship season was the nineteenth season of the FIA European Rallycross Championship under that name. It was held across eleven rounds starting at the Rallycross-Ring in Austria on April 17 and ending at the Estering in Germany on October 2.

The champions were Richard Hutton (Division 1), Kenneth Hansen (Division 2), and Susann Bergvall (1400 Cup), who became the first ever female European Rallycross champion.

== Calendar ==
Round	Date	Venue	City	Country	Winner (Div 1)	Winner (Div 2)	Winner (1400 Cup)
1	April 17	Rallycross-Ring	Melk	Austria	(Norway) Ludvig Hunsbedt	(Sweden) Kenneth Hansen	(Austria) Manfred Beck
2	May 8	Eurocircuito de Lousada	Lousada	Portugal	(United Kingdom) Richard Hutton	(Sweden) Kenneth Hansen	(Sweden) Susann Bergvall
3	June 5	Circuit des Ducs	Essay	France	(Germany) Bernd Leinemann	(France) Jean-Luc Pailler	(Netherlands) Ruud Verkooijen
4	June 12	Mondello Park	Naas	Ireland	(Germany) Bernd Leinemann	(France) Jean-Luc Pailler	(United Kingdom) Cecil Haffey
5	June 19	Croft Circuit	Croft-on-Tees	United Kingdom	(United Kingdom) Nick Jones	(Norway) Martin Schanche	(United Kingdom) John Haffey
6	July 10	Höghedenbanan	Älvsbyn	Sweden	(Germany) Bernd Leinemann	(Sweden) Kenneth Hansen	(Czech Republic) Pavel Novotný
7	July 17	Ahvenisto Race Circuit	Hämeenlinna	Finland	(United Kingdom) Richard Hutton	(Norway) Martin Schanche	(Belgium) Rudy Lauwers
8	August 14	Duivelsbergcircuit	Maasmechelen	Belgium	(Norway) Gunnar Kittilsen	(Sweden) Kenneth Hansen	(Belgium) Etienne Van Den Branden
9	August 21	Eurocircuit	Valkenswaard	Netherlands	(Czech Republic) Pavel Koutný	(Norway) Martin Schanche	(Netherlands) Ko Kasse
10	September 4	Lyngås Motorbane	Tranby i Lier	Norway	(Norway) Ludvig Hunsbedt	(Sweden) Kenneth Hansen	(Sweden) Susann Bergvall
11	October 2	Estering	Buxtehude	Germany	(United Kingdom) Richard Hutton	(France) Jean-Luc Pailler	(Sweden) Susann Bergvall

== Drivers ==
=== Div. 1 ===
Constructor	Car	Driver	Rounds
Ford	Ford Escort RS Cosworth	(Norway) Ludvig Hunsbedt	All
Ford	Ford Escort RS Cosworth	(United Kingdom) Richard Hutton	2–11
Ford	Ford Escort RS Cosworth	(Czech Republic) Pavel Koutný	All
Ford	Ford Escort RS Cosworth	(Germany) Bernd Leinemann	All
Nissan	Nissan Sunny GTI	(United Kingdom) Tony Bardy	5, 9, 11
Nissan	Nissan Sunny GTI	(Germany) Jan H. Becker	6–9, 11
Nissan	Nissan Sunny GTI	(Norway) Eivind Opland	All
Nissan	Nissan Sunny GTI	(Norway) Henning Solberg	10
Nissan	Nissan Sunny GTI	(Netherlands) Nelis Verkooijen	1–3, 5, 8–9, 11
Toyota	Toyota Celica Turbo 4WD	(Sweden) Ingvar Carlsson	11
Toyota	Toyota Celica Turbo 4WD	(Sweden) Gunde Svan	All

=== Div. 2 ===
Constructor	Car	Driver	Rounds
Citroën	Citroën Xantia T16 4x4	(France) Jean-Luc Pailler	All
Citroën	Citroën ZX 16V Turbo 4x4	(Sweden) Kenneth Hansen	All
Ford	Ford Escort RS Cosworth	(Sweden) Stig Blomqvist	10
Ford	Ford Escort RS Cosworth	(France) Patrick Herbert	3
Ford	Ford Escort RS Cosworth	(Norway) Jan Arthur Iversen	3, 5–9, 11
Ford	Ford Escort RS Cosworth	(Norway) Martin Iversen	1
Ford	Ford Escort RS Cosworth	(Sweden) Michael Jernberg	1–3, 8–11
Ford	Ford Escort RS Cosworth	(Czech Republic) Petr Koutný	3–7, 10–11
Ford	Ford Escort RS Cosworth	(United Kingdom) Terry Maynard	5
Ford	Ford Escort RS Cosworth	(France) Christian Ménier	3
Ford	Ford Escort RS Cosworth	(United Kingdom) Steve Palmer	11
Ford	Ford Escort RS Cosworth	(Norway) Bjørn Skogstad	4–10
Ford	Ford Escort RS Cosworth	(United Kingdom) Barry Squibb	All
Ford	Ford Escort RS 2000 T16 4x4	(Norway) Martin Schanche	All
Peugeot	Peugeot 309 GTi T16 4x4	(United Kingdom) Will Gollop	All
Renault	Renault 21 Turbo 4x4	(Russia) Alexander Erofeev	1–6, 8–11
Renault	Renault 21 Turbo 4x4	(Russia) Vladimir Makarov	All
Subaru	Subaru Impreza 555 BiTurbo	(Sweden) Per Eklund	All

=== 1400 Cup ===
Constructor	Car	Driver	Rounds
Citroën	Citroën AX GTi	(Netherlands) Ko Kasse	3, 8–11
Citroën	Citroën AX GT	(Belgium) Johan Moons	8
Citroën	Citroën AX Sport		
Citroën	Citroën AX Sport	(Austria) Manfred Beck	All
Citroën	Citroën AX Sport	(Sweden) Susann Bergvall	All
Citroën	Citroën AX Sport	(Czech Republic) Vlastimil Boháček	1–5, 8–11
Citroën	Citroën AX Sport	(Portugal) José Borges	2
Citroën	Citroën AX Sport	(United Kingdom) Ian Brooks	5, 8
Citroën	Citroën AX Sport	(Belgium) Noël Cokelaere	8–9
Citroën	Citroën AX Sport	(France) Michel Danjou	3, 8–9, 11
Citroën	Citroën AX Sport	(Sweden) Lars Hagestig	8–11
Citroën	Citroën AX Sport	(Belgium) Christian Heck	3, 8–9
Citroën	Citroën AX Sport	(Germany) Kerstin Hellström	2, 6, 8–9, 11
Citroën	Citroën AX Sport	(Denmark) Johnny Jensen	6
Citroën	Citroën AX Sport	(Netherlands) René Kusters	9
Citroën	Citroën AX Sport	(Belgium) Tony Kuypers	1–3, 8–9, 11
Citroën	Citroën AX Sport	(Portugal) José Lacerda	2
Citroën	Citroën AX Sport	(Finland) Juha Lehtonen	6–7, 10
Citroën	Citroën AX Sport	(Spain) António Nabeira	2
Citroën	Citroën AX Sport	(Sweden) Björn Ohlsson	1, 3, 6–11
Citroën	Citroën AX Sport	(United Kingdom) Sohrab Padidar Nazar	5
Citroën	Citroën AX Sport	(Czech Republic) Pavel Novotný	All
Citroën	Citroën AX Sport	(Germany) Sven Seeliger	8–9, 11
Citroën	Citroën AX Sport	(Germany) Harry Siebert	1, 3
Citroën	Citroën AX Sport	(Netherlands) Jo van de Ven	8–9, 11
Rover	Rover 114 GTi 16V	(United Kingdom) Mike Dresser	1. 8–9, 11
Rover	Rover Metro GTi	(Denmark) Gert Jakobsen	1, 6–11
Rover	Rover Metro GTi	(Denmark) Peter Købke Nielsen	1–5, 8–11
Rover	Rover Metro GTi	(Sweden) Lars Månsson	8–11
Rover	Rover Metro GTi	(Austria) Gert Pfeifer	1
Suzuki	Suzuki Swift 1300	(Sweden) Joakim Gustavsson	10
Suzuki	Suzuki Swift 1300	(United Kingdom) Cecil Haffey	4
Suzuki	Suzuki Swift 1300	(United Kingdom) John Haffey	5
Suzuki	Suzuki Swift 1300	(Portugal) Fernando Santos	2
Suzuki	Suzuki Swift 1300	(Canada) Kevin Sherry	4
Suzuki	Suzuki Swift 1300	(Netherlands) Ruud Verkooijen	1–3, 5, 8–9, 11

== Standings ==
=== Div. 1 ===
Pos	Driver	(Austria)	(Portugal)	(France)	(Republic of Ireland)	(United Kingdom)	(Sweden)	(Finland)	(Belgium)	(Netherlands)	(Norway)	(Germany)	Pts
1	(United Kingdom) Richard Hutton		20	17	17	(11)	17	20	(12)	(0)	17	20	128
2	(Germany) Bernd Leinemann	17	(10)	20	20	13	20	(9)	(11)	17	(10)	12	119
3	(Norway) Ludvig Hunsbedt	20	(0)	(10)	(6)	15	13	13	17	13	20	(11)	111
