= 2013 European Rallycross Championship =

FIA European Rallycross Championship season

Seasons
- ← 2012 2014 →

The 2013 European Rallycross Championship was the thirty seventh season of the FIA European Championships for Rallycross Drivers. The season consisted of nine rounds and started on 31 March with the British round at Lydden Hill Race Circuit. The season ended on 21 September, at Germany in Estering.

== Calendar ==
Round	Event	Dates	Venue	Class	Final Winner	Car	Team	Report
1	(United Kingdom) Euro RX of Great Britain	31 March–1 April	Lydden Hill Race Circuit, Wootton					
1	(United Kingdom) Euro RX of Great Britain	31 March–1 April	Lydden Hill Race Circuit, Wootton	Supercar	(United States) Tanner Foust	Ford Fiesta ST	(Sweden) Olsbergs MSE	report
1	(United Kingdom) Euro RX of Great Britain	31 March–1 April	Lydden Hill Race Circuit, Wootton	Super1600	(Denmark) Ulrik Linnemann	Peugeot 207	(Denmark) Linnemann Motorsport	report
1	(United Kingdom) Euro RX of Great Britain	31 March–1 April	Lydden Hill Race Circuit, Wootton	TouringCar	(Republic of Ireland) Derek Tohill	Ford Fiesta	(Republic of Ireland) Derek Tohill	report
2	Euro RX of Portugal	27–28 April	Pista Automóvel de Montalegre, Montalegre					
2	Euro RX of Portugal	27–28 April	Pista Automóvel de Montalegre, Montalegre	Supercar	(United Kingdom) Liam Doran	Citroën DS3	(United Kingdom) LD Motorsports	report
2	Euro RX of Portugal	27–28 April	Pista Automóvel de Montalegre, Montalegre	Super1600	(Sweden) Kevin Eriksson	Renault Clio	(Finland) Set Promotion	report
2	Euro RX of Portugal	27–28 April	Pista Automóvel de Montalegre, Montalegre	TouringCar	(Sweden) Robin Larsson	Škoda Fabia	(Sweden) Robin Larsson	report
3	Euro RX of Hungary	25–26 May	Nyirád Motorsport Centrum, Nyirád					
3	Euro RX of Hungary	25–26 May	Nyirád Motorsport Centrum, Nyirád	Supercar	(Sweden) Timmy Hansen	Citroën DS3	(Sweden) Citroën Hansen Motorsport	report
3	Euro RX of Hungary	25–26 May	Nyirád Motorsport Centrum, Nyirád	Super1600	(Latvia) Reinis Nitišs	Renault Clio	(Finland) Set Promotion	report
3	Euro RX of Hungary	25–26 May	Nyirád Motorsport Centrum, Nyirád	TouringCar	(Sweden) Daniel Lundh	Volvo C30	(Sweden) Daniel Lundh	report
4	Euro RX of Finland	8–9 June	Tykkimäen Moottorirata, Kouvola					
4	Euro RX of Finland	8–9 June	Tykkimäen Moottorirata, Kouvola	Supercar	(United States) Tanner Foust	Ford Fiesta ST	(Sweden) Olsbergs MSE	report
4	Euro RX of Finland	8–9 June	Tykkimäen Moottorirata, Kouvola	Super1600	(Latvia) Reinis Nitišs	Renault Clio	(Finland) Set Promotion	report
4	Euro RX of Finland	8–9 June	Tykkimäen Moottorirata, Kouvola	TouringCar	(Czech Republic) Roman Častoral	Opel Astra	(Czech Republic) Roman Častoral	report
5	Euro RX of Norway	15–16 June	Lånkebanen, Hell					
5	Euro RX of Norway	15–16 June	Lånkebanen, Hell	Supercar	(United Kingdom) Liam Doran	Citroën DS3	(United Kingdom) LD Motorsports	report
5	Euro RX of Norway	15–16 June	Lånkebanen, Hell	Super1600	(Latvia) Reinis Nitišs	Renault Clio	(Finland) Set Promotion	report
5	Euro RX of Norway	15–16 June	Lånkebanen, Hell	TouringCar	(Norway) Lars Øivind Enerberg	Ford Fiesta	(Norway) Lars Øivind Enerberg	report
6	Euro RX of Sweden	6–7 July	Höljesbanan, Höljes					
6	Euro RX of Sweden	6–7 July	Höljesbanan, Höljes	Supercar	(Norway) Andreas Bakkerud	Citroën DS3	(Norway) Bakkerud Motorsport	report
6	Euro RX of Sweden	6–7 July	Höljesbanan, Höljes	Super1600	(Denmark) Ulrik Linnemann	Peugeot 207	(Denmark) Linnemann Motorsport	report
6	Euro RX of Sweden	6–7 July	Höljesbanan, Höljes	TouringCar	(Republic of Ireland) Derek Tohill	Ford Fiesta	(Republic of Ireland) Derek Tohill	report
7	Euro RX of France	31 August–1 September	Circuit de Lohéac, Lohéac					
7	Euro RX of France	31 August–1 September	Circuit de Lohéac, Lohéac	Supercar	(Norway) Andreas Bakkerud	Citroën DS3	(Norway) Bakkerud Motorsport	report
7	Euro RX of France	31 August–1 September	Circuit de Lohéac, Lohéac	Super1600	(Latvia) Reinis Nitišs	Renault Clio	(Finland) Set Promotion	report
7	Euro RX of France	31 August–1 September	Circuit de Lohéac, Lohéac	TouringCar	(Republic of Ireland) Derek Tohill	Ford Fiesta	(Republic of Ireland) Derek Tohill	report
8	Euro RX of Austria	14–15 September	PS Racing Center, Greinbach					
8	Euro RX of Austria	14–15 September	PS Racing Center, Greinbach	Supercar	(Norway) Alexander Hvaal	Citroën DS3	(Sweden) Citroën Hansen Motorsport	report
8	Euro RX of Austria	14–15 September	PS Racing Center, Greinbach	Super1600	(Latvia) Reinis Nitišs	Renault Clio	(Finland) Set Promotion	report
8	Euro RX of Austria	14–15 September	PS Racing Center, Greinbach	TouringCar	(Republic of Ireland) Derek Tohill	Ford Fiesta	(Republic of Ireland) Derek Tohill	report
9	Euro RX of Germany	21–22 September	Estering, Buxtehude					
9	Euro RX of Germany	21–22 September	Estering, Buxtehude	Supercar	(Norway) Alexander Hvaal	Citroën DS3	(Sweden) Citroën Hansen Motorsport	report
9	Euro RX of Germany	21–22 September	Estering, Buxtehude	Super1600	(Latvia) Reinis Nitišs	Renault Clio	(Finland) Set Promotion	report
9	Euro RX of Germany	21–22 September	Estering, Buxtehude	TouringCar	(Sweden) Robin Larsson	Škoda Fabia	(Sweden) Robin Larsson	report

== Entries ==
=== Supercar ===
Constructor	Entrant	Car	No.	Driver	Round(s)
Citroën
Citroën	(France) Davy Jeanney	Citroën C4	6	(France) Davy Jeanney	All
Citroën	(Norway) Morten Bermingrud	Citroën C4	14	(Norway) Morten Bermingrud	5–9
Citroën	(Finland) Janne Kanerva	Citroën C4	48	(Finland) Janne Kanerva	4
Citroën	(France) Alain Heu	Citroën C4	79	(France) Alain Heu	7
Citroën	(Sweden) Namus Hansen Motorsport	Citroën DS3	1	(Russia) Timur Timerzyanov	All
Citroën	(Sweden) PSRX	Citroën DS3	11	(Norway) Petter Solberg	All
Citroën	(Sweden) Citroën Hansen Motorsport	Citroën DS3	21	(Sweden) Timmy Hansen	All
Citroën	(Sweden) Citroën Hansen Motorsport	Citroën DS3	25	(Norway) Alexander Hvaal	All
Citroën	(United Kingdom) LD Motorsports	Citroën DS3	33	(United Kingdom) Liam Doran	All
Citroën	(United Kingdom) Pat Doran	Citroën DS3	46	(United Kingdom) Pat Doran	1
Citroën	(Norway) Bakkerud Motorsport	Citroën DS3	66	(Norway) Andreas Bakkerud	All
Citroën	(France) Alexandre Theuil	Citroën DS3	81	(France) Alexandre Theuil	7
Citroën	(France) Hervé "Knapick" Lemonnier	Citroën DS3	82	(France) Sébastien Loeb	7
Citroën	(Portugal) Pedro Matos	Citroën Xsara	42	(Portugal) Pedro Matos	2
Ford	(United Kingdom) Julian Godfrey	Ford Fiesta	12	(United Kingdom) Julian Godfrey	1
Ford	(Sweden) Olsbergs MSE	Ford Fiesta	18	(Sweden) Patrik Sandell	6
Ford	(Sweden) Olsbergs MSE	Ford Fiesta	34	(United States) Tanner Foust	1, 4, 7
Ford	(Sweden) Olsbergs MSE	Ford Fiesta	38	(United States) Brian Deegan	4
Ford	(Sweden) Olsbergs MSE	Ford Fiesta	57	(Finland) Toomas Heikkinen	4
Ford	(Sweden) Olsbergs MSE	Ford Fiesta	63	(Sweden) Mikael Thiman	6
Ford	(Estonia) Reinsalu Sport	Ford Fiesta	44	(Estonia) Valdur Reinsalu	4–6
Ford	(Estonia) Reinsalu Sport	Ford Fiesta	45	(Estonia) Andri Õun	4–6
Ford	(Finland) Silvo Viitanen	Ford Fiesta	47	(Finland) Silvo Viitanen	4, 6
Ford	(Finland) Ari Perkiömäki	Ford Fiesta	51	(Finland) Ari Perkiömäki	4
Ford	(Norway) Tore Kristoffersen	Ford Fiesta	59	(Norway) Tore Kristoffersen	5–7
Ford	(Norway) Frank Valle	Ford Fiesta	67	(Norway) Frank Valle	6
Ford	(Norway) Knut Ove Børseth	Ford Focus	7	(Norway) Knut Ove Børseth	5–6
Ford	(Belgium) De Bokkenrijders	Ford Focus	9	(Belgium) Michaël De Keersmaecker	1
Ford	(Finland) Pekka Leppihalme	Ford Focus	10	(Finland) Jussi-Petteri Leppihalme	1, 4–6
Ford	(Austria) Alois Höller	Ford Focus	16	(Austria) Alois Höller	8
Ford	(Germany) Jörg Jockel	Ford Focus	17	(Germany) Jörg Jockel	9
Ford	(Finland) Atro Määttä	Ford Focus	50	(Finland) Atro Määttä	4, 6
Ford	(Belgium) Jos Jansen	Ford Focus	54	(Belgium) Jos Jansen	All
Ford	(Norway) Stein Egil Jenssen	Ford Focus	55	(Norway) Stein Egil Jenssen	5–6, 9
Ford	(United Kingdom) Kevin Procter	Ford Focus	77	(United Kingdom) Kevin Procter	7
Ford	(France) Pascal Le Nouvel	Ford Focus	99	(France) Pascal Le Nouvel	7
Mitsubishi	(Hungary) RXC Technics Motorsport	Mitsubishi Lancer	36	(Hungary) Zoltán Vass	3
Mitsubishi	(Hungary) RXC Technics Motorsport	Mitsubishi Lancer	37	(Hungary) Zoltán Harsányi	3
Mitsubishi	(Estonia) Sten Oja	Mitsubishi Lancer	56	(Estonia) Sten Oja	9
Mitsubishi	(Finland) Pekka Mustakallio	Mitsubishi Lancer	58	(Finland) Pekka Mustakallio	4
Opel	(Portugal) Joaquim Santos	Opel Astra	41	(Portugal) Joaquim Santos	2
Peugeot	(Belgium) Oud-Turnhout Rally Team	Peugeot 207	4	(Belgium) Ronny Scheveneels	1–3
Peugeot	(France) Gaëtan Sérazin	Peugeot 207	71	(France) Gaëtan Sérazin	7
Peugeot	(France) Hervé Lemonnier	Peugeot 207	72	(France) "Knapick"	7
Peugeot	(Lebanon) Nabil Karam	Peugeot 207	74	(Lebanon) Nabil Karam	7
Peugeot	(France) Jean Juin	Peugeot 207	75	(France) Jean Juin	7
Peugeot	(France) Jean Philippe Dayraut	Peugeot 207	80	(France) Jean Philippe Dayraut	7
Peugeot	(France) Jean-Luc Pailler	Peugeot 208	2	(France) Jean-Luc Pailler	7
Peugeot	(Belgium) De Bokkenrijders	Peugeot 208	9	(Belgium) Michaël De Keersmaecker	2–3
Peugeot	(United Kingdom) Albatec Racing	Peugeot 208	26	(United Kingdom) Andy Scott	All
Peugeot	(United Kingdom) Albatec Racing	Peugeot 208	27	(United Kingdom) Kris Meeke	7
Peugeot	(France) Fabien Pailler	Peugeot 208	73	(France) Fabien Pailler	7
Renault	(Sweden) Helmia Motorsport	Renault Clio	5	(Sweden) Stig-Olov Walfridson	1–6, 8–9
Renault	(Norway) Tord Linnerud	Renault Clio	15	(Norway) Tord Linnerud	5, 8–9
Renault	(Norway) Mats Lysen	Renault Clio	22	(Norway) Mats Lysen	1–6
Renault	(Norway) Henning Nyberg	Renault Clio	64	(Norway) Henning Nyberg	6
Renault	(France) Jérôme Grosset-Janin	Renault Clio	70	(France) Jérôme Grosset-Janin	7
Saab	(Sweden) Eklund Motorsport	Saab 9-3	39	(Sweden) Per Eklund	9
Saab	(Sweden) Eklund Motorsport	Saab 9-3	53	(Finland) Toni Lukander	4, 6
Saab	(Norway) Henning Solberg Motorsport	Saab 9-3	88	(Norway) Henning Solberg	1, 5–7
SEAT	(Denmark) Team Rømer	SEAT Córdoba	65	(Denmark) Dennis Rømer	6, 9
Škoda	(Norway) Knut Ove Børseth	Škoda Fabia	7	(Norway) Knut Ove Børseth	1–4
Škoda	(Sweden) Peter Hedström	Škoda Fabia	8	(Sweden) Peter Hedström	All
Škoda	(Germany) Bernd Schomaker	Škoda Fabia	29	(Germany) Bernd Schomaker	9
Škoda	(Hungary) Nyirád Motorsport	Škoda Fabia	35	(Hungary) Attila Mózer	3
Škoda	(Finland) Aki Karttunen	Škoda Fabia	52	(Finland) Aki Karttunen	4
Volkswagen	(France) Robert Theuil	Volkswagen Golf	78	(France) Robert Theuil	7
Volkswagen	(Sweden) Marklund Motorsport	Volkswagen Polo	68	(Sweden) Mattias Ekström	6
Volkswagen	(Sweden) Marklund Motorsport	Volkswagen Polo	92	(Sweden) Anton Marklund	All
Volkswagen	(Sweden) Volkswagen Dealer Team KMS	Volkswagen Scirocco	61	(Sweden) Johan Kristoffersson	6
Volkswagen	(Sweden) Volkswagen Dealer Team KMS	Volkswagen Scirocco	62	(Sweden) Pontus Tidemand	6
Volvo	(Norway) Daniel Holten	Volvo C30	3	(Norway) Daniel Holten	5–6
Volvo	(Norway) Frode Holte	Volvo C30	13	(Norway) Frode Holte	8–9
Volvo	(Norway) HTB Racing	Volvo C30	60	(Norway) Tommy Rustad	5–6
Volvo	(Sweden) Mats Öhman	Volvo S40	49	(Sweden) Mats Öhman	6–7, 9

=== Super1600 ===
Constructor	Entrant	Car	No.	Driver(s)	Round(s)
Audi	(France) Yvonnick Jagu	Audi A1	78	(France) Yvonnick Jagu	7
Citroën	(Austria) Werner Panhauser	Citroën C2	8	(Austria) Werner Panhauser	8
Citroën	(Sweden) Citroën Hansen Motorsport	Citroën C2	21	(Sweden) Eric Färén	All
Citroën	(Spain) Jose Alberto Pereira Blanco	Citroën C2	23	(Spain) Jose Alberto Pereira Blanco	2
Citroën	(Estonia) RS Racing Team	Citroën C2	41	(Estonia) Siim Saluri	4, 6, 9
Citroën	(Norway) Lina Marie Holt	Citroën C2	64	(Norway) Lina Marie Holt	6
Citroën	(Denmark) Jan Petersen	Citroën C2	65	(Denmark) Jan Petersen	6, 9
Citroën	(France) Laurent Chartrain	Citroën C2	71	(France) Laurent Chartrain	7
Citroën	(France) Maximiliem Eveno	Citroën C2	75	(France) Maximiliem Eveno	7
Citroën	(France) Guy Moreton	Citroën C2	86	(France) Guy Moreton	7
Citroën	(France) Rudolf Schafer	Citroën DS3	25	(France) Rudolf Schafer	2, 7
Citroën	(Belgium) Oud-Turnhout Rally Team	Citroën DS3	55	(Belgium) Davy Van Den Branden	9
Citroën	(France) Nicolas Gouriou	Citroën DS3	80	(France) Nicolas Gouriou	7
Citroën	(Portugal) José Polónio	Citroën Saxo	20	(Portugal) José Polónio	2
Citroën	(Portugal) Olavo Ribeiro	Citroën Saxo	24	(Portugal) Pedro Ribeiro	2
Citroën	(France) Franck Hello	Citroën Saxo	72	(France) Franck Hello	7
Citroën	(France) Julien Fébreau	Citroën Saxo	74	(France) Julien Fébreau	7
Citroën	(France) Mickaël Martin	Citroën Saxo	88	(France) Mickaël Martin	7
Citroën	(Hungary) RXC Technics Motorsport	Citroën Saxo	97	(Hungary) Szabolcs Végh	8–9
Ford	(Czech Republic) L.S Racing SRO	Ford Fiesta	5	(Czech Republic) Ondřej Smetana	1, 3, 6–9
Ford	(Germany) Sven Seeliger	Ford Fiesta	12	(Germany) Sven Seeliger	9
Ford	(Norway) Robert Aamodt	Ford Fiesta	51	(Norway) Robert Aamodt	6
Ford	(France) Guillaume Bergeon	Ford Puma	90	(France) Guillaume Bergeon	7
Opel	TQS Hungary	Opel Astra	34	(Hungary) Béla Ujházi	3
Opel	TQS Hungary	Opel Corsa	32	(Hungary) Béla Gorácz	3
Opel	(Norway) Malin Gjerstad	Opel Corsa	52	(Norway) Malin Gjerstad	5–6
Opel	(Norway) Christoffer Lia	Opel Corsa	63	(Norway) Christoffer Lia	6
Peugeot	(Hungary) Strotising-Bánkuti Motorsport	Peugeot 206	31	(Hungary) Gábor Bánkuti	3
Peugeot	(Hungary) Strotising-Bánkuti Motorsport	Peugeot 206	33	(Hungary) "Luigi"	3
Peugeot	(Denmark) Mike Louring Frederiksen	Peugeot 206	56	(Denmark) Mike Louring Frederiksen	9
Peugeot	(France) Emmanuel Martin	Peugeot 206	73	(France) Emmanuel Martin	7
Peugeot	(France) Yves Lecomte	Peugeot 206	83	(France) Yves Lecomte	7
Peugeot	(France) Patrick Jarret	Peugeot 206	85	(France) Patrick Jarret	7
Peugeot	(France) Jimmy Terpereau	Peugeot 206	96	(France) Jimmy Terpereau	7
Peugeot	(Denmark) Linnemann Motorsport	Peugeot 207	2	(Denmark) Ulrik Linnemann	All
Peugeot	(Portugal) Olavo Ribeiro	Peugeot 207	24	(Portugal) Pedro Ribeiro	7
Peugeot	(France) Christophe Larroque	Peugeot 207	91	(France) Christophe Larroque	7
Peugeot	(Czech Republic) LAS Racing SRO	Peugeot 208	95	(Czech Republic) Jan Skála	7
Renault	(Finland) Set Promotion	Renault Clio	15	(Latvia) Reinis Nitišs	All
Renault	(Finland) Set Promotion	Renault Clio	39	(Sweden) Kevin Eriksson	1–3, 5–6
Renault	(Finland) Set Promotion	Renault Clio	43	(Finland) Joni Wiman	4
Renault	(Finland) Set Promotion	Renault Clio	92	(France) Steven Bossard	7
Renault	(Germany) ACN-Buxtehude	Renault Clio	22	(Germany) Andreas Steffen	5–6, 9
Renault	(Germany) ACN-Buxtehude	Renault Clio	30	(Germany) Ralph Wilhelm	1, 9
Renault	(Sweden) Mattias Andersson	Renault Clio	62	(Sweden) Mattias Andersson	6
Renault	(France) Eric Guillemette	Renault Clio	70	(France) Eric Guillemette	7
Renault	(France) Dorian Launay	Renault Clio	76	(France) Dorian Launay	7
Renault	(France) Jean-Luc Durel	Renault Clio	81	(France) Jean-Luc Durel	7
Renault	(France) Jean-Baptiste Dubourg	Renault Clio	82	(France) Jean-Baptiste Dubourg	7
Renault	(Finland) Set Promotion	Renault Twingo	4	(Russia) Ildar Rakhmatullin	All
Renault	(Finland) Set Promotion	Renault Twingo	89	(Russia) Timur Shigaboutdinov	All
Renault	(Russia) STK Namus	Renault Twingo	46	(Russia) Rasul Minnikhanov	2–9
Renault	(France) David Olivier	Renault Twingo	77	(France) David Olivier	7
Renault	(France) Gaëtan Jan	Renault Twingo	84	(France) Gaëtan Jan	7
Škoda	(Russia) Vadim Makarov	Škoda Fabia	6	(Russia) Vadim Makarov	1–4, 6–7
Škoda	(Estonia) Ligur Racing	Škoda Fabia	10	(Estonia) Janno Ligur	4, 6, 8–9
Škoda	(Lithuania) VSI Kauno Sporto Klubas	Škoda Fabia	11	(Lithuania) Kasparas Navickas	9
Škoda	(Germany) Clemens Meyer	Škoda Fabia	14	(Germany) Clemens Meyer	9
Škoda	(Russia) Sergej Zagumennov	Škoda Fabia	16	(Russia) Sergej Zagumennov	1–5, 7–9
Škoda	(Germany) Andreas Steffen	Škoda Fabia	22	(Germany) Andreas Steffen	3
Škoda	(Austria) Klaus Freudenthaler	Škoda Fabia	35	(Austria) Klaus Freudenthaler	3
Škoda	(Germany) All-Inkl.com Münnich Motorsport	Škoda Fabia	37	(Germany) René Münnich	1, 3, 6–8
Škoda	(Germany) All-Inkl.com Münnich Motorsport	Škoda Fabia	38	(Germany) Mandie August	1, 3, 6–8
Škoda	(Sweden) Sandra Hultgren	Škoda Fabia	60	(Sweden) Sandra Hultgren	6
Škoda	(Sweden) Simon Olofsson	Škoda Fabia	61	(Sweden) Simon Olofsson	6
Škoda	(Czech Republic) Zdeněk Kučera	Škoda Fabia	94	(Czech Republic) Zdeněk Kučera	7
Volkswagen	(Lithuania) ASK Vilkyciai	Volkswagen Polo	3	(Lithuania) Ernestas Staponkus	1, 4
Volkswagen	(Germany) Erik Jockel	Volkswagen Polo	17	(Germany) Erik Jockel	9
Volkswagen	(Latvia) Reinis Safonovs	Volkswagen Polo	40	(Latvia) Reinis Safonovs	4
Volkswagen	(Austria) RCC Süd	Volkswagen Polo	42	(Austria) Christian Petrakovits	1, 3, 8
Volkswagen	(France) Dominique Gerbaud	Volkswagen Polo	87	(France) Dominique Gerbaud	7
Toyota	(Denmark) Peter Nielsen	Toyota Yaris	7	(Denmark) Peter Nielsen	9

=== TouringCar ===
Constructor	Entrant	Car	No.	Drivers	Round(s)
BMW	(Finland) Jari Järvenpää	BMW RX 120i	62	(Finland) Jari Järvenpää	6
Citroën	(Norway) Thorbjørn Ulla	Citroën C4	66	(Norway) Thorbjørn Ulla	6
Citroën	(Norway) Ernst H. Holten Leifsen	Citroën DS3	56	(Norway) Ernst H. Holten Leifsen	6
Citroën	(Norway) Christian Sandmo	Citroën Xsara	54	(Norway) Christian Sandmo	5
Ford	(Norway) Anders Bråten	Ford Fiesta	3	(Norway) Anders Bråten	1, 5–7, 9
Ford	(Belgium) Koen Pauwels	Ford Fiesta	5	(Belgium) Koen Pauwels	All
Ford	(Sweden) RMM Byggplåt	Ford Fiesta	10	(Sweden) Lars Rosendahl	6, 9
Ford	(Republic of Ireland) Derek Tohill	Ford Fiesta	11	(Republic of Ireland) Derek Tohill	All
Ford	(Finland) Ville Rautiainen	Ford Fiesta	41	(Finland) Ville Rautiainen	4
Ford	(Sweden) Roger Enlund	Ford Fiesta	42	(Sweden) Roger Enlund	4–8
Ford	(Finland) Tomi Koirikivi	Ford Fiesta	43	(Finland) Tomi Koirikivi	4
Ford	(Norway) Lars Øivind Enerberg	Ford Fiesta	55	(Norway) Lars Øivind Enerberg	5–6
Ford	(Denmark) Jakob Teil Hansen	Ford Fiesta	60	(Denmark) Jakob Teil Hansen	6
Ford	(Finland) Janne Sinkkonen	Ford Fiesta	61	(Finland) Janne Sinkkonen	9
Ford	(Norway) Åge R. Hansen	Ford Fiesta	63	(Norway) Åge R. Hansen	6
Ford	(Norway) Torleif Lona	Ford Fiesta	73	(Norway) Torleif Lona	1–3, 6
Ford	(Norway) David Nordgård	Ford Focus	73	(Norway) David Nordgård	1–3, 6
Mazda	(Norway) Jan Gabrielsen	Mazda RX-8	52	(Norway) Jan Gabrielsen	5–6
Mazda	(Norway) Tom Daniel Tånevik	Mazda RX-8	64	(Norway) Tom Daniel Tånevik	6
Opel	(Czech Republic) Czech National Team	Opel Astra	7	(Czech Republic) Roman Častoral	All
Opel	(Norway) Kevin Taylor	Opel Astra	67	(Norway) Kevin Taylor	6
Opel	(Norway) Ole Håbjørg	Opel Corsa	51	(Norway) Ole Håbjørg	5–6, 8–9
Peugeot	(Hungary) M-F Motorsport	Peugeot 206	31	(Hungary) Gyӧrgy Fodor	3, 8
Škoda	(Sweden) Robin Larsson	Škoda Fabia	4	(Sweden) Robin Larsson	All
Volvo	(Sweden) Daniel Lundh	Volvo C30	6	(Sweden) Daniel Lundh	1, 3–9
Volvo	(Norway) Cato Erga	Volvo C30	53	(Norway) Cato Erga	5–6

== Championship standings ==
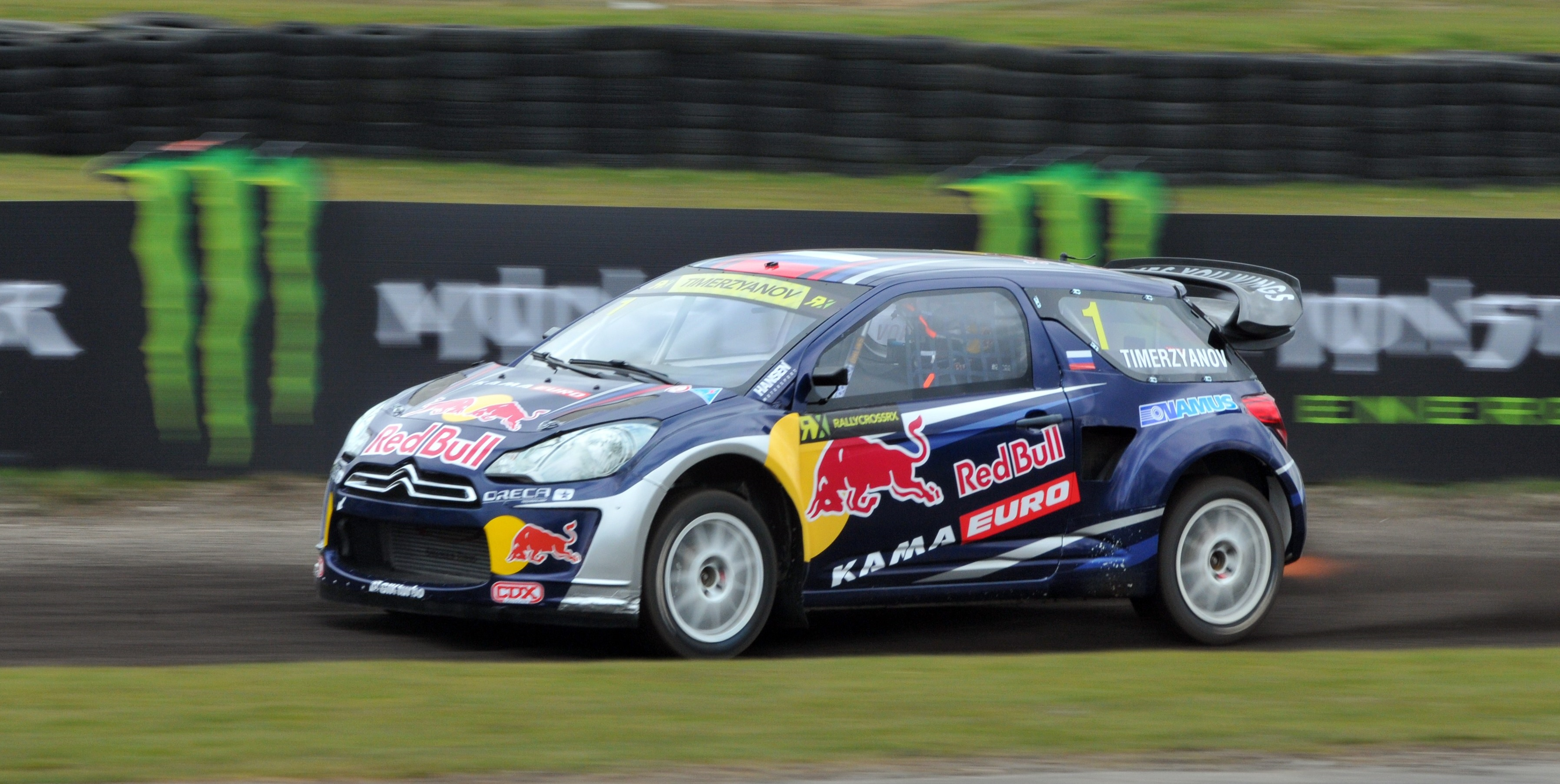
Timur Timerzyanov won his second consecutive European Championship

=== Supercar ===
(key)

Pos.	Driver	GBR (United Kingdom)	POR (Portugal)	HUN (Hungary)	FIN (Finland)	NOR (Norway)	SWE (Sweden)	FRA (France)	AUT (Austria)	GER (Germany)	Points
1	(Russia) Timur Timerzyanov	5	6	2	2	2	11	4	2	4	185
2	(France) Davy Jeanney	6	5	3	8	3	8	3	3	7	156
3	(Sweden) Timmy Hansen	3	11	1	3	9	3	8	10	13	145
4	(Norway) Andreas Bakkerud	12	7	15	6	5	1	1	13	2	133
5	(United Kingdom) Liam Doran	11	1	12	4	1	35	14	5	3	121
6	(Norway) Alexander Hvaal	8	4	6	12	4	7	10	1	1	116
7	(Sweden) Anton Marklund	7	9	8	9	7	21	13	7	9	102
8	(Norway) Petter Solberg	10	3	9	5	13	6	2	6	6	93
9	(United States) Tanner Foust	1			1			6			68
10	(Sweden) Peter Hedström	17	12	5	17	6	18	21	8	8	63
11	(Sweden) Stig-Olov Walfridsson	12	8	17	18	16	14		4	5	57
12	(Norway) Knut Ove Børseth	9	10	4	10	17	16				47
13	(Norway) Mats Lysen		2	7	14	22	19				42
14	(Norway) Daniel Holten					11	5				28
15	(Norway) Henning Solberg	15				18	4	12			28
16	(Finland) Jussi-Petteri Leppihalme	2			19	12	31				27
17	(Sweden) Mattias Ekström						2				23
18	(Finland) Toomas Heikkinen				7						18
19	(France) Gaëtan Sérazin							5			17
20	(Norway) Tommy Rustad					8	17				16
21	(Norway) Frode Holte								9	14	15
22	(Sweden) Patrik Sandell						9				14
22=	(United Kingdom) Julian Godfrey	4									14
24	(France) Fabien Pailler							7			14
25	(Norway) Morten Bermingrud					15	15	20		11	13
26	(Norway) Tord Linnerud					10			11	12	12
27	(France) Sébastien Loeb							9			11
27=	(Sweden) Johan Kristoffersson						10				11
29	(Hungary) Zoltán Harsányi			10							10
30	(Finland) Toni Lukander				15		12				9
31	(Finland) Ari Perkiömäki				11						8
32	(France) Jean-Philippe Dayraut							11			8
33	(Hungary) Attila Mózer			11							7
34	(Belgium) Michaël De Keersmaecker		14	13							7
35	(France) Jean-Luc Pailler		13					28			6
36	(Belgium) Jos Jansen	16	16	16	20	20	24	26	15	18	5
37	(United States) Brian Deegan				13						4
38	(Hungary) Zoltán Vass			14							4
39	(Sweden) Mikael Thiman						13				4
40	(United Kingdom) Andy Scott	14	15	19	26	19	23	15	12	15	3
41	(Norway) Tore Kristoffersen					14	25	27			3
41=	(Austria) Alois Höller								14		3
43	(France) Hervé Lemonnier							16			1
43=	(Denmark) Dennis Rømer						34			16	1
45	(United Kingdom) Pat Doran	18									0
45=	(Belgium) Ronny Scheveneels	19	18	19							0
45=	(Portugal) Joaquim Santos		17								0
45=	(Portugal) Pedro Matos		19								0
45=	(Finland) Pekka Mustakallio				21						0
45=	(Finland) Atro Määttä				22		32				0
45=	(Estonia) Valdur Reinsalu				23	21	28				0
45=	(Finland) Janne Kanerva				24						0
45=	(Finland) Silvo Viitanen				27		30				0
45=	(Norway) Stein Egil Jenssen					20	20			20	0
45=	(Norway) Henning Nyberg						22				0
45=	(Sweden) Pontus Tidemand						26				0
45=	(Norway) Frank Valle						29				0
45=	(France) Jérôme Grosset-Janin							17			0
45=	(United Kingdom) Kevin Procter							19			0
45=	(France) Alain Heu							22			0
45=	(France) Pascal Le Nouvel							23			0
45=	(France) Jean Juin							24			0
45=	(France) Robert Theuil							29			0
45=	(France) Alexandre Theuil							30			0
45=	(Lebanon) Nabil Karam							31			0
45=	(Sweden) Per Eklund									17	0
45=	(Estonia) Sten Oja									19	0
45=	(Germany) Bernd Schomaker									21	0
45=	(Germany) Jörg Jockel									22	0
70	(Sweden) Mats Öhman						27	25		10	-6
71	(Finland) Aki Karttunen				16						-14
72	(Estonia) Andri Õun					24	33				-15
72=	(United Kingdom) Kris Meeke							18			-15
Pos.	Driver	GBR (United Kingdom)	POR (Portugal)	HUN (Hungary)	FIN (Finland)	NOR (Norway)	SWE (Sweden)	FRA (France)	AUT (Austria)	GER (Germany)	Points

=== Super1600 ===
(key)

Pos.	Driver	GBR (United Kingdom)	POR (Portugal)	HUN (Hungary)	FIN (Finland)	NOR (Norway)	SWE (Sweden)	FRA (France)	AUT (Austria)	GER (Germany)	Points
1	(Latvia) Reinis Nitišs	6	4	1	1	1	2	1	1	1	227
2	(Russia) Ildar Rakhmatullin	5	5	2	2	2	5	7	3	6	187
3	(Denmark) Ulrik Linnemann	1	3	6	5	3	1	22	2	3	185
4	(Sweden) Eric Färén	3	2	7	3	5	4	5	5	5	184
5	(Russia) Timur Shigaboutdinov	4	10	12	4	7	15	11	10	2	117
6	(Russia) Sergej Zagumennov	8	6	9	9	4		18	4	4	104
7	(Russia) Vadim Makarov	2	7	5	6		3	9			101
8	(Sweden) Kevin Eriksson	9	1	3		6	6				96
9	(Russia) Rasul Minnikhanov		8	4	8	8	7	17	14	9	76
10	(Germany) René Münnich	7		8			8	12	9		54
11	(Germany) Andreas Steffen					9	12			8	30
12	(Estonia) Janno Ligur				13		10 <		12	12	26
13	(France) Steven Bossard							2			26
14	(Austria) Christian Petrakovits	13		15					6		25
15	(Czech Republic) Ondřej Smetana						13	21	7	10	24
16	(France) David Olivier							3			21
17	(Germany) Mandie August	10		18			17	30	11		18
18	(Latvia) Ernestas Staponkus	11			10						17
19	(France) Laurent Chartrain							6			15
20	(France) Jean-Baptiste Dubourg							8			14
21	(France) Maximilien Eveno							4			14
22	(France) Rudolf Schafer		9					13			14
23	(Lithuania) Kasparas Navickas									7	13
23=	(Finland) Joni Wiman				7						13
25	(Estonia) Siim Saluri				11		14			16	12
26	(Austria) Werner Panhauser								8		11
27	(Hungary) "Luigi"			10							10
28	(Sweden) Sandra Hultgren						9				10
29	(Sweden) Simon Olofsson						11				9
30	(France) Julien Fébreau							10			9
31	(Hungary) Gábor Bánkuti			11							9
31=	(Norway) Malin Gjerstad					10	22				9
33	(Germany) Sven Seeliger									11	8
34	(Portugal) José Polonio		11								7
35	(Germany) Ralph Wilhelm	12								19	6
35=	(Portugal) Pedro Ribeiro		12					36			6
35=	(Latvia) Reinis Safonovs				12						6
38=	(Austria) Klaus Freudenthaler			13							4
38=	(Germany) Mike Louring Frederiksen									13	4
38=	(Hungary) Szabolcs Végh								13	17	4
41	(France) Mickaël Martin							14			3
41=	(Hungary) Béla Gorácz			14							3
41=	(Germany) Clemens Meyer									14	3
44=	(Belgium) Davy Van Den Branden									15	2
44=	(France) Guillaume Bergeon							15			2
46	(France) Eric Guillemette							16			1
46=	(Norway) Robert Aamodt						16				1
46=	(Hungary) Béla Ujházi			16							1
49	(Denmark) Jan Petersen						18			18	0
50	(Norway) Christoffer Lia						19				0
50=	(France) Jimmy Terpereau							19			0
52	(Norway) Lina Marie Holt						20				0
52=	(France) Dominique Gerbaud							20			0
52=	(Germany) Erik Jockel									20	0
55	(Sweden) Mattias Andersson						21				0
55=	(Denmark) Peter Nielsen									21	0
57	(France) Yvonnick Jagu							23			0
58	(Czech Republic) Jan Skála							24			0
59	(France) Jean-Luc Durel							25			0
60	(France) Franck Hello							26			0
61	(France) Nicolas Gouriou							27			0
62	(France) Guy Moreton							28			0
63	(France) Emmanuel Martin							29			0
64	(France) Christophe Larroque							31			0
65	(France) Patrick Jarret							32			0
66	(Czech Republic) Zdeněk Kučera							33			0
67	(France) Gaëtan Jan							34			0
68	(France) Yves Lecomte							35			0
69	(France) Dorian Launay							37			0
Pos.	Driver	GBR (United Kingdom)	POR (Portugal)	HUN (Hungary)	FIN (Finland)	NOR (Norway)	SWE (Sweden)	FRA (France)	AUT (Austria)	GER (Germany)	Points

=== TouringCar ===
(key)

Pos.	Driver	GBR (United Kingdom)	POR (Portugal)	HUN (Hungary)	FIN (Finland)	NOR (Norway)	SWE (Sweden)	FRA (France)	AUT (Austria)	GER (Germany)	Points
1	(Republic of Ireland) Derek Tohill	1	5	3	2	2	1	1	1	6	212
2	(Sweden) Robin Larsson	2	1	5	6	10	5	6	2	1	170
3	(Czech Republic) Roman Častoral	3	3	2	1	7	3	3	3	9	168
4	(Belgium) Koen Pauwels	4	2	4	8	4	10	5	4	7	156
5	(Sweden) Daniel Lundh	8		1	3	9	2	2	6	5	152
6	(Norway) David Nordgård	6	4	7	7	5	9	7	5	10	121
7	(Norway) Anders Bråten	7				3	21	8		2	61
8	(Norway) Ole Håbjørg					8	11		7	3	58
9	(Norway) Torleif Lona	5	6	6			6				56
10	(Sweden) Roger Enlund				4	13	12	4	9		52
11	(Norway) Lars Øivind Enerberg					1	19				28
12	(Norway) Jan Gabrielsen					11	8				22
13	(Sweden) Lars Rosendahl						14			4	21
14	(Hungary) Gyӧrgy Fodor			8					8		21
15	(Norway) Christian Sandmo					6					19
16	(Norway) Ernst Holten Leifsen						7				17
17	(Norway) Tom Daniel Tånevik						4				14
18	(Finland) Ville Rautiainen				5						13
19	(Finland) Janne Sinkkonen									8	11
20	(Finland) Tomi Koirikivi				9						8
21	(Norway) Cato Erga					12	18				7
22	(Denmark) Jakob Teil Hansen						13				4
23	(Finland) Jari Järvenpää						15				2
24	(Norway) Ben-Philip Gundersen						16				1
25	(Norway) Kevin Taylor						17				0
26	(Norway) Thorbjørn Ulla						20				0
27	(Norway) Åge Roar Hansen						22				0
Pos.	Driver	GBR (United Kingdom)	POR (Portugal)	HUN (Hungary)	FIN (Finland)	NOR (Norway)	SWE (Sweden)	FRA (France)	AUT (Austria)	GER (Germany)	Points
