= Michael Jernberg =

Swedish rallycross driver (born 1963)

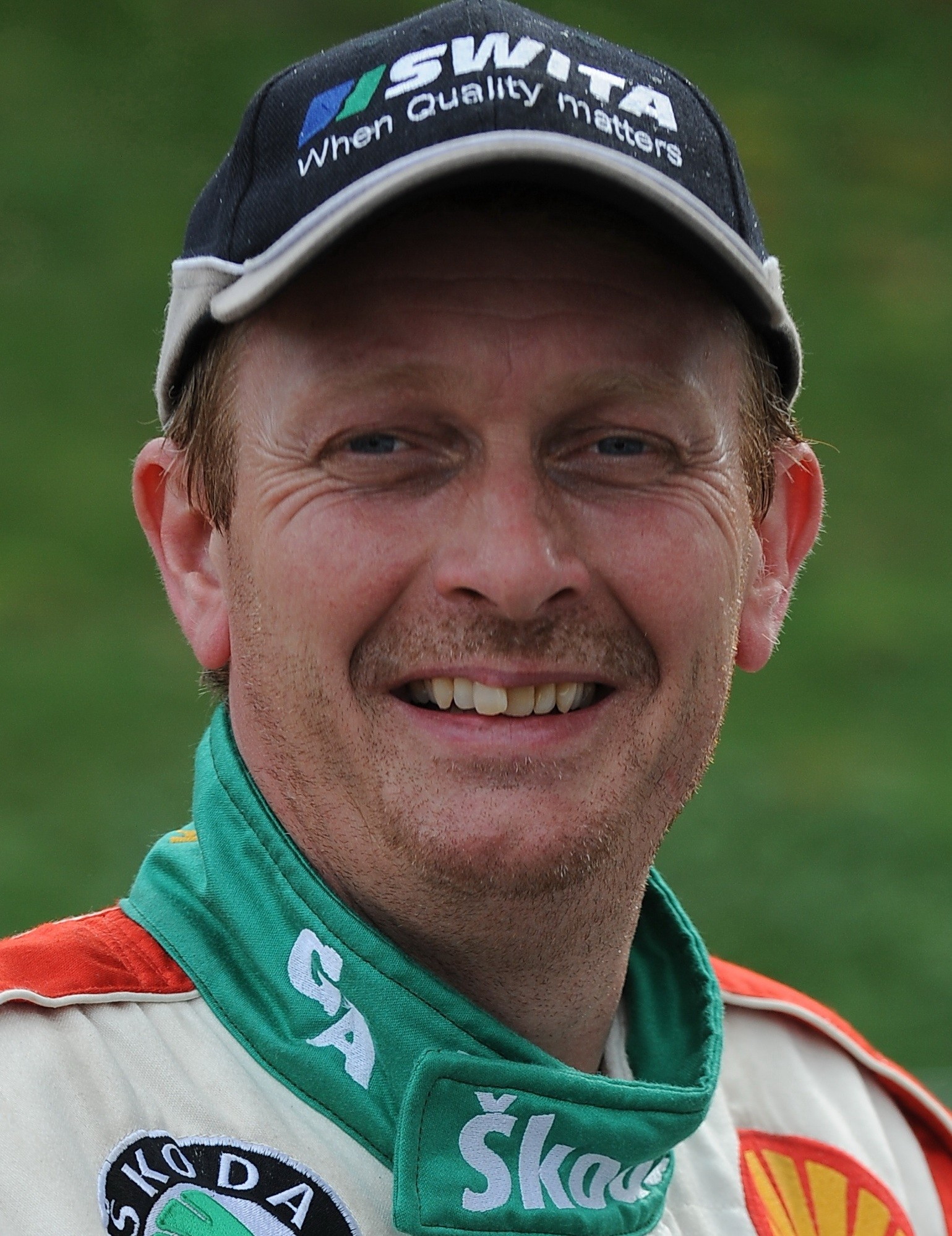
- Jernberg in 2008
- Nationality: (Sweden) Swedish
- Born: Kennet Michael Jernberg; January 6, 1963 (age 63) Kinna, Sweden
- Retired: 2011

FIA European Rallycross Championship
- Years active: 1991–2010
- Teams: Jernberg Motorsport
- Starts: 187
- Wins: 18
- Podiums: 64
- Best finish: 2nd in 2004, 2005 and 2009 (Division 1)

Kennet Michael Jernberg (born January 6, 1963) is a former rallycross driver from Kinna, Sweden.

== Career ==
Jernberg made his debut in the European Rallycross Championship (ERX) in 1991, driving an ex-Stig Blomqvist Ford Sierra RS 500 Cosworth in Division 1, finishing fifth overall. He improved to third overall in 1992, winning the last round at Estering, Germany. In 1993 he switched to the more prestigious Division 2, driving a Ford Escort RS Cosworth, finishing eleventh in his first season. Over the next sixteen years he challenged for the title, but the closest him came was second overall in 2004, 2005 and 2009. He ended his long association with Ford after the 2007 ERX season and used cars from Škoda until his retirement.

Despite the lack of title success in Europe, he managed to win the Swedish Rallycross Championship in 1995, 1998 and 2001.

He took part in the inaugural season of the Global RallyCross Championship (GRC) in 2011, finishing fourth overall in the AWD class.

== Retirement ==
He retired after the 2011 GRC season and in 2014 he became team principal of Larsson Jernberg Motorsport (LJM). LJM currently runs an Audi A1 for Robin Larsson in the FIA World Rallycross Championship.

== Racing record ==
=== Complete European Rallycross Championship results ===
==== Division 1 ====
Year	Entrant	Car	1	2	3	4	5	6	7	8	9	10	11	ERX	Points
1991	Jernberg Motorsport	Ford Sierra RS500 Cosworth	POR; 4	AUT; 4	FIN; 5	FRA (7)	IRE; 2	SWE; 3	BEL; 6	NED (16)	NOR (8)	GBR; 3	GER (9)	5th	95
1992	Jernberg Motorsport	Ford Sierra RS500 Cosworth	GBR (6)	AUT	POR	FIN; 2	SWE; 1	FRA; 3	IRE; 3	BEL (9)	NED; 3	NOR; 3	GER; 1	3rd	117

==== Division 2 ====
Year	Entrant	Car	1	2	3	4	5	6	7	8	9	10	11	12	ERX	Points
1993	Jernberg Motorsport	Ford Escort RS Cosworth	AUT	POR	FRA	IRE	SWE; 3	FIN; 10	BEL; 11	NED; NC	NOR; 9	GER; 7			11	46
1994	Jernberg Motorsport	Ford Escort RS Cosworth	AUT; 5	POR; 4	FRA; NC	IRE	GBR	SWE	FIN	BEL; 8	NED; 8	NOR; 8	GER; 11		9th	58
1995	Jernberg Motorsport	Ford Escort RS Cosworth	AUT	POR	FRA	SWE; 5	GBR (8)	IRE; 7	BEL; 3	NED; 6	NOR; 7	FIN; 3	CZE; 7	GER; 5	7th	95
1996	Jernberg Motorsport	Ford Escort RS Cosworth	AUT; 4	POR; 2	FRA; 5	SWE (6)	IRE; 4	GBR; 3	BEL (8)	NED; 1	NOR (5)	CZE; 3	GER (6)		4th	105

==== Division 1^{*} ====
Year	Entrant	Car	1	2	3	4	5	6	7	8	9	10	11	ERX	Points
1997	Jernberg Motorsport	Ford Escort RS Cosworth	AUT (NC)	FRA; 3	POR; 1	GBR; 5	SWE; 5	FIN; 4	BEL (6)	NOR (8)	CZE; 3	GER; 2		4th	106
1998	Jernberg Motorsport	Ford Escort RS Cosworth	AUT; 5	POR; 3	FRA; 4	SWE; 2	GBR (6)	FIN	BEL; 3	NOR (6)	GER; 4	CZE; 1		4th	105
1999	Jernberg Motorsport	Ford Focus RS WRC	CZE; 3	FRA; 4	POR; 11	SWE; 2	FIN (NC)	BEL (NC)	NED; 6	NOR; 5	GER; 10			5th	81
2000	Jernberg Motorsport	Ford Focus RS WRC	POR	FRA	CZE; 6	SWE; 6	BEL; 2	NED; 2	NOR; 4	POL; 3	GER; 11			6th	90
2001	Jernberg Motorsport	Ford Focus RS WRC	FRA	POR	AUT; 9	CZE; 7	SWE; 6	BEL (NC)	NED; 3	NOR (8)	POL; 1	GER; 5		6th	76
2002	Jernberg Motorsport	Ford Focus RS WRC	POR	FRA; 11	AUT; 7	CZE; 11	SWE; 9	BEL; 6	NED; 9	NOR (10)	POL; 6	GER; 3		6th	75
2003	Jernberg Motorsport	Ford Focus T16	POR; 8	FRA (NC)	AUT; 8	CZE; 5	SWE; 12	BEL; 4	NED; 10	NOR; 7	POL; 11	GER (NC)		9th	71
2004	Jernberg Motorsport	Ford Focus T16	POR (10)	FRA; 9	CZE; 4	AUT; 5	NOR; 4	SWE; 3	BEL (11)	NED; 2	POL; 2	GER; 2		2nd	112
2005	Jernberg Motorsport	Ford Focus T16	FRA; 3	POR; 3	AUT (6)	CZE; 1	NOR; 5	SWE; 1	BEL; 1	NED; 2	POL (6)	GER; 6		2nd	130
2006	Jernberg Motorsport	Ford Focus T16	POR; 11	FRA; 5	CZE; 10	AUT; 11	SWE; 5	HUN; 3	BEL (NC)	NED; 4	NOR; 1	POL; 3	GER; 6	6th	111
2007	Jernberg Motorsport	Ford Focus ST T16	POR; 7	FRA; 1	HUN; 1	AUT; 6	SWE (NC)	NOR; 8	BEL; 1	NED; 4	POL; 10	CZE (NC)		5th	110
2008	Jernberg Motorsport	Škoda Fabia T16	POR; 5	FRA; 4	HUN; 2	AUT; 1	NOR (6)	SWE; 3	BEL; 2	NED (NC)	CZE; 8	POL; 6	GER; 4	3rd	127
2009	Jernberg Motorsport	Škoda Fabia T16	GBR; 6	POR (11)	FRA; 3	HUN; 1	AUT; 1	SWE (6)	BEL; 2	GER; 3	POL; 2	CZE; 2		2nd	132
2010	Jernberg Motorsport	Škoda Fabia T16	POR; 1	FRA; 1	GBR (9)	HUN; 2	SWE; 5	FIN; 6	BEL; 3	GER (11)	POL; 4	CZE; 4		4th	121

^{*} Division 2 was rebranded as Division 1 in 1997.

=== Complete Global RallyCross Championship results ===
==== Super AWD ====
Year	Entrant	Car	1	2	3	4	5	6	7	8	GRC	Points
2011	Jernberg Motorsport	Škoda Fabia T16	IRW1; 2	IRW2; 9	SEA1; 4	SEA2; 2	PIK1; 5	PIK2; 7	LA1; 15	LA2; 15	4th	81

== Publications ==
Michael Jernberg – Jakten på EM-guldet, by Michael Jernberg & Morgan Björk, 176 pages, Swedish language, ISBN 9789197655491
