= Per Eklund =

Swedish rally driver (born 1946)

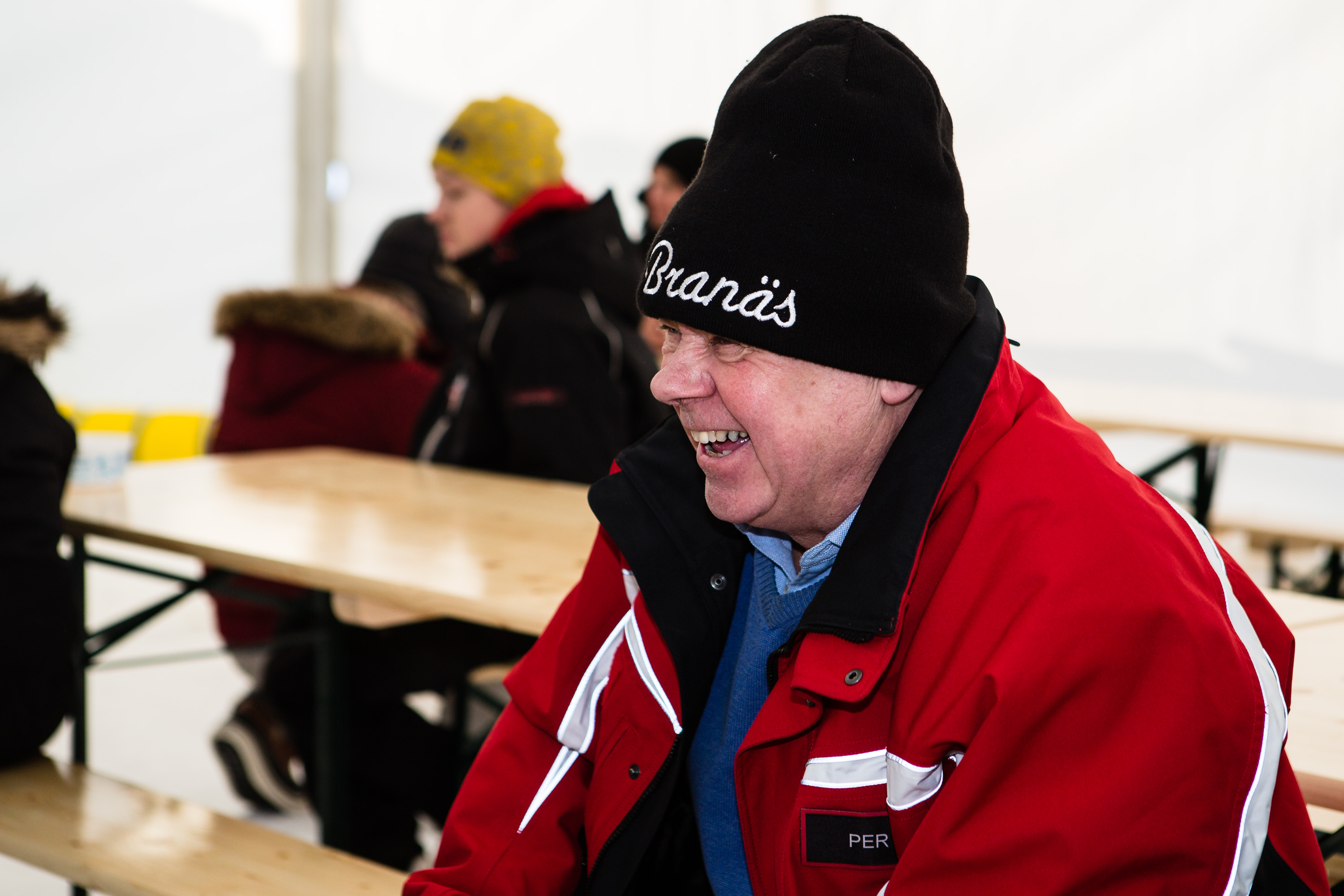
- Per Eklund in February 2015

Personal information
- Nationality: (Sweden) Swedish
- Full name: Per Torsten Eklund
- Born: 21 June 1946 (age 80); Eda, Sweden

World Rally Championship record
- Years active: 1973–1997
- Co-driver: (Sweden) Rolf Carlsson (Sweden) Björn Cederberg (Sweden) Bo Reinicke (Sweden) Hans Sylvan (Sweden) Ragnar Spjuth (Sweden) Jan-Olof Bohlin (United Kingdom) Dave Whittock (Sweden) Bruno Berglund (Sweden) Johnny Johansson (Sweden) Anders Olsson
- Teams: Saab, Toyota, Nissan, Austin Rover, Subaru
- Rallies: 83
- Championships: 0
- Rally wins: 1
- Podiums: 13
- Stage wins: 73
- Total points: 270
- First rally: 1973 Swedish Rally
- First win: 1976 Swedish Rally
- Last rally: 1997 RAC Rally

FIA World Rallycross Championship
- Years active: 2014–2015
- Former teams: Eklund Motorsport
- Starts: 2
- Wins: 0
- Podiums: 0
- Best finish: 35th in 2015

FIA ERX Supercar Championship
- Years active: 2011, 2013–2014
- Former teams: Eklund Motorsport
- Starts: 4
- Wins: 0
- Podiums: 0
- Best finish: 22nd in 2011

FIA ERX Division 1 (1997–2010) Championship
- Years active: 1997–2010
- Former teams: Eklund Motorsport; Clarion Team Europe
- Starts: 131
- Championships: 1 (1999)
- Wins: 12
- Podiums: 42

FIA ERX Division 2 (1982–1996) Championship
- Years active: 1990–1991, 1993–1996
- Former teams: Clarion Team Europe
- Starts: 47
- Wins: 2
- Podiums: 17
- Best finish: 4th in 1995

FIA European Rallycross Cup
- Years active: 1976–1978
- Former teams: Saab
- Starts: 7
- Wins: 0
- Podiums: 1
- Best finish: 10th in 1976

Per Torsten Eklund (born 21 June 1946) is a Swedish Rally and Rallycross driver. His nickname is "Pekka". In rallying he never made it to the very top but he has been very successful in his later rallycross career. He has been described in CAR Magazine in 2022 as a "rally legend".

== Biography ==
=== Saab works drive ===
After his education as a driving instructor, together with later teammate Stig Blomqvist at the Kvinnersta Folkhögskola outside of Örebro, Eklund was a Saab factory driver from 1970 till 1979. In 1982, however, the year after Saab discontinued its official rallying involvement, he achieved the brand's last top position in a World Championship event, finishing fourth in the Swedish Rally driving a privately entered, Clarion-sponsored Saab 99 Turbo. He was always proud of that result, since the competition consisted mostly of four-wheel-drive cars, and the event was run in snow. This signified the end of the rally era at Saab, even though Eklund went on to drive an officially-entered Saab 900 Turbo in the British round of the 1997 World Rally Championship. He was Swedish Champion in 1978, beating his team mate Stig Blomqvist. In 1982, Eklund finished fifth overall of the FIA World Rally Championship for Drivers.

=== Rallycross ===
In 1971, Eklund started driving Rallycross at Valkenswaard in The Netherlands, and some months later he won the first ever Swedish Rallycross event at Hedemora, on 17 October 1971. He first drove a Saab 96 V4, in the early years of the Embassy/ERA European Rallycross Championship as teammate to his compatriot Stig Blomqvist. He was always prominent, became 7th overall respectively fourth overall in the first and second European Championship series of 1973 and 1974, but his greatest successes have been in later times. From the early 1990s till 2009, his last full season, he was one of the fastest competitors of the FIA European Championship for Rallycross Drivers. In 1999, Eklund claimed his first and only European title for Drivers of the Division 1, nowadays known as the SuperCars category.

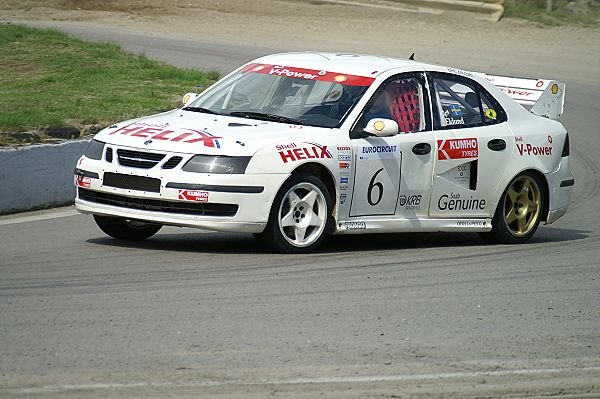
Per Eklund in a Saab 9-3 in the Netherlands in 2006

=== Toyota ===
Eklund joined Toyota Team Europe in 1980, and gave the second generation Celica's one of its best WRC result by finished second in the 1981 Rallye Côte d'Ivoire. He drove the Group B Celica Twincam Turbo TA64 in selected 1983 and 1984 World Rally Championship events. Eklund also rallied Group A Corolla AE86 and Celica Supra 2800 GT in the British Rally Championship.

==== Accomplishments ====
- FIA European Rallycross Champion 1999 with Saab 9-3 T16 4x4
- 2nd overall in the 1998, 2002 and 2003 FIA European Rallycross Championships
- 3rd overall in the 2000 and 2001 FIA European Rallycross Championships
- Swedish Rallycross Champion 2004

== Best international rally results (top three results only) ==
=== 1969 ===
- Norwegian Winter Rally (N), 1st, Saab 96 V4, co-driver ?

=== 1971 ===
- Norwegian Winter Rally (N), 1st, Saab 96 V4, co-driver ?

=== 1972 ===
- Firestone Rally (E), 1st, Saab 96 V4, co-driver ?
- Dutch Texaco Rally (NL), 1st, Saab 96 V4, co-driver ?
- Österreichische Alpenfahrt (A), 3rd, Saab 96 V4, co-driver Bo Reinicke

=== 1973 ===
- Swedish Rally (S), 2nd, Saab 96 V4, co-driver Rolf Carlsson
- Österreichische Alpenfahrt (A), 3rd, Saab 96 V4, co-driver Bo Reinicke

=== 1976 ===
- Swedish Rally (S), 1st, Saab 96 V4, co-driver Björn Cederberg

=== 1980 ===
- 1000 Lakes Rally (FIN), 3rd, Triumph TR7 V8, co-driver Hans Sylvan

=== 1981 ===
- Ivory Coast Rally (CI), 2nd, Toyota Celica 2000GT, co-driver Ragnar Spjuth

=== 1982 ===
- Portugal Rally (P), 2nd, Toyota Celica 2000GT (RA45), co-driver Ragnar Spjuth
- Rally of New Zealand (NZ), 2nd, Toyota Celica 2000GT (RA64), co-driver Ragnar Spjuth
- Ivory Coast Rally (CI), 2nd, Toyota Celica 2000GT (RA64), co-driver Ragnar Spjuth

=== 1983 ===
- Ivory Coast Rally (CI), 3rd, Toyota Celica TCT, co-driver Ragnar Spjuth

=== 1984 ===
- Swedish Rally (S), 3rd, Audi quattro A2, co-driver Dave Whittock
- RAC Rally (GB), 3rd, Toyota Celica TCT, co-driver Dave Whittock

=== 1988 ===
- Safari Rally (EAK), 3rd, Nissan 200SX, co-driver Dave Whittock

=== 1989 ===
- Swedish Rally (S), 2nd, Lancia Delta HF integrale, co-driver Dave Whittock

=== 1991 ===
- Hunsrück-Rallye (D), 3rd, Lancia Delta HF integrale 16V, co-driver Jan-Olof Bohlin

== Pikes Peak ==
- Pikes Peak International Hill Climb (USA): In 2000, Per Eklund achieved a record time of 11:21.58 in his Saab 9-3 Viggen 4x4 while racing the Pikes Peak Open category that was valid until being bettered in 2012 by Frenchman Romain Dumas.
- In 2002, Per Eklund took the Unlimited Class Victory. Eklund and his Saab's performance defeated the second place Unlimited Class entry and long-time Swedish rival Stig Blomqvist by over 34 seconds with a time of 11:13.20.

== Trivia ==
En får ente ge sej (Värmland dialect for "One must not give up") is Eklund's motto and the title of his biography. By Per Eklund & Anders Tunberg, 210 pages, Sportförlaget 1998, ISBN 91-88540-95-2

== Racing record ==
=== Complete IMC results ===
Year	Entrant	Car	1	2	3	4	5	6	7	8	9
1970	Saab AB	Saab 96 V4	MON	SWE; Ret	ITA	KEN	AUT	GRE	GBR		
1971	Saab Scania	Saab 96 V4	MON	SWE; Ret	ITA	KEN	MAR	AUT	GRE	FRA	GBR; 7
1972	Saab Scania	Saab 96 V4	MON	SWE; 8	KEN	MAR	GRE; Ret	AUT; 3	ITA	USA	GBR; Ret

=== Complete WRC results ===
Year	Entrant	Car	1	2	3	4	5	6	7	8	9	10	11	12	13	14	WDC	Pts
1973	Saab-Scania	Saab 96 V4	MON	SWE; 2	POR	KEN	MOR	GRE	POL	FIN; Ret	AUT; 3	ITA	USA	GBR; Ret	FRA		N/A	
1974	Saab-Scania	Saab 96 V4	POR	KEN	FIN; Ret	ITA	CAN	USA	GBR; Ret	FRA							N/A	
1975	Saab-Scania	Saab 96 V4	MON	SWE; 4	KEN	GRE	MOR	POR	FIN; 4	ITA	FRA	GBR; Ret					N/A	
1976	Saab-Scania	Saab 96 V4	MON	SWE; 1	POR	KEN	GRE	MOR									N/A	
1976	Saab-Scania	Saab 99 EMS							FIN; Ret	ITA	FRA	GBR; Ret					N/A	
1977	Saab-Scania	Saab 99 EMS	MON	SWE; Ret	POR	KEN	NZL	GRE	FIN; Ret	CAN	ITA	FRA	GBR; 9				NC	0
1978	Saab-Scania	Saab 99 EMS	MON	SWE; Ret	KEN	POR	GRE										NC	0
1978	Per Eklund	Porsche Carrera						FIN; 4	CAN	ITA	CIV	FRA					NC	0
1978	Saab-Scania	Saab 99 Turbo											GBR; Ret				NC	0
1979	Fiat Alitalia	Fiat Ritmo 75	MON; Ret														54th	3
1979	Saab-Scania	Saab 99 Turbo		SWE; Ret	POR	KEN	GRE	NZL									54th	3
1979	British Leyland Cars	Triumph TR7 V8							FIN; 8	CAN	ITA; Ret	FRA	GBR; 13	CIV			54th	3
1980	Pierburg	Volkswagen Golf GTi	MON; 5														11th	27
1980	Team Datsun Sweden	Datsun 160J		SWE; 8													11th	27
1980	British Leyland Cars	Triumph TR7 V8			POR; Ret	KEN	GRE	ARG	FIN; 3	NZL	ITA	FRA	GBR; 7				11th	27
1980	Premoto Toyota	Toyota Celica 2000 GT												CIV; Ret			11th	27
1981	Pierburg	Volkswagen Golf GTi	MON; Ret														10th	29
1981	Publimo Racing / Clarion	Porsche 911 SC		SWE; 9													10th	29
1981	Toyota Team Europe	Toyota Celica 2000 GT			POR; Ret	KEN	FRA; 6	GRE; Ret	ARG	BRA							10th	29
1981	Rallysport News Team	Porsche 911 SC									FIN; Ret	ITA					10th	29
1981	Premoto Toyota	Toyota Celica 2000 GT											CIV; 2				10th	29
1981	Toyota Team Great Britain	Toyota Celica 2000 GT												GBR; 6			10th	29
1982	Saab Sport	Saab 99 Turbo	MON	SWE; 4													5th	57
1982	Toyota Team Europe	Toyota Celica 2000 GT			POR; 2	KEN	FRA	GRE	NZL; 2	BRA							5th	57
1982	Rallysport News Team	Porsche 911 SC									FIN; Ret						5th	57
1982	Volkswagen Motorsport	Volkswagen Golf GTi 16S										ITA; Ret					5th	57
1982	Premoto Toyota	Toyota Celica 2000 GT											CIV; 2				5th	57
1982	Toyota Team Great Britain	Toyota Celica 2000 GT												GBR; 9			5th	57
1983	Saab Sport	Saab 99 Turbo	MON	SWE; Ret	POR	KEN	FRA	GRE	NZL	ARG							10th	22
1983	Sesab Service	Audi Quattro A2									FIN; 4	ITA					10th	22
1983	Premoto Toyota	Toyota Celica 2000 GT											CIV; 3				10th	22
1983	Toyota Team Great Britain	Toyota Celica 2000 GT												GBR; Ret			10th	22
1984	Clarion	Audi Quattro A2	MON	SWE; 3	POR						FIN; 6	ITA	CIV				7th	30
1984	Westlands Motors	Toyota Celica Twincam Turbo				KEN; Ret	FRA	GRE	NZL	ARG							7th	30
1984	Toyota Team Great Britain	Toyota Celica Twincam Turbo												GBR; 3			7th	30
1985	Clarion Svenska	Audi Quattro A2	MON	SWE; 5	POR	KEN	FRA	GRE	NZL	ARG	FIN; 6	ITA	CIV	GBR; 4			10th	24
1986	Austin Rover WRT	MG Metro 6R4	MON	SWE; Ret	POR	KEN	FRA	GRE	NZL	ARG				GBR; 7	USA		34th	8
1986	Clarion Team Europe	MG Metro 6R4									FIN; 7	CIV	ITA				34th	8
1987	Subaru Deutschland	Subaru RX Turbo	MON; 10														12th	25
1987	Clarion Team Europe	Audi Coupé Quattro		SWE; 7	POR							FIN; 4	CIV	ITA	GBR; EX		12th	25
1987	Fuji Heavy Industries	Subaru RX Turbo				KEN; 5	FRA	GRE									12th	25
1987	Nissan Motorsports International	Nissan 200SX							USA; 9	NZL	ARG						12th	25
1988	Clarion Team Europe	Lancia Delta HF 4WD	MON	SWE; Ret													20th	12
1988	Nissan Motorsports International	Nissan 200SX			KEN; 3	FRA	GRE	USA	NZL	ARG	FIN	CIV	ITA				20th	12
1988	Clarion Team Europe	Nissan March Turbo												GBR; 21			20th	12
1989	Clarion Team Europe	Lancia Delta Integrale	SWE; 2								FIN; Ret	AUS	ITA	CIV	GBR; Ret		19th	16
1989	Clarion Team Europe	Nissan March Turbo		MON; Ret	POR			GRE; 10	NZL	ARG							19th	16
1989	Nissan Motorsports International	Nissan 200SX				KEN; Ret	FRA										19th	16
1990	Clarion Team Europe	Lancia Delta Integrale 16V	MON	POR	KEN	FRA	GRE	NZL	ARG	FIN; Ret	AUS	ITA	CIV	GBR; 12			NC	0
1991	Clarion Team Europe	Lancia Delta Integrale 16V	MON	SWE; 8	POR	KEN	FRA	GRE	NZL	ARG	FIN	AUS	ITA	CIV	ESP	GBR; Ret	49th	3
1992	Clarion Team Europe	Subaru Legacy RS	MON	SWE; 6	POR												32nd	8
1992	Noriyuki Koseki	Subaru Legacy 4WD Turbo				KEN; 9	FRA	GRE	NZL	ARG	FIN	AUS	ITA	CIV	ESP		32nd	8
1992	Per Eklund	Subaru Legacy RS														GBR; 12	32nd	8
1993	Eklund Team Europe	Subaru Legacy RS	MON	SWE; 6	POR	KEN	FRA	GRE	ARG	NZL	FIN	AUS	ITA	ESP			31st	6
1996	Clarion Team Europe	Subaru Legacy RS	SWE; 17	KEN	IDN	GRE	ARG	FIN	AUS	ITA	ESP						NC	0
1997	Per Eklund	Saab 900 Turbo	MON	SWE	KEN	POR	ESP	FRA	ARG	GRE	NZL	FIN	IDN	ITA	AUS	GBR; Ret	NC	0

=== Complete FIA European Rallycross Cup results ===
Year	Entrant	Car	1	2	3	4	5	6	7	8	9	10	11	ERC	Points
1976	Saab	Saab 96 V4 Turbo	AUT1; 4	GER1; 6	FIN; 9	SWE	BEL; 6	AUT2	NED	GBR1	GER2	GBR2		10th	24
1977	Saab	Saab 96 V4 Turbo	AUT1	NED1; 6	ITA	SWE1	FIN	BEL1	SWE2	NED2	BEL2	GER	AUT2	24th	6
1978	Per Eklund	Porsche Carrera 3.0	AUT	ITA	SWE; 9	FIN; 3	BEL	NED	FRA	GBR	GER			27th	14

=== Complete FIA European Rallycross Championship results ===
==== Division 2 ====
Year	Entrant	Car	1	2	3	4	5	6	7	8	9	10	11	12	ERX	Points
1990	Clarion Team Europe	MG Metro 6R4	AUT	SWE; 6	FIN	IRE	FRA	BEL	NED	NOR	GER	GBR			21st	11
1991	Clarion Team Europe	MG Metro 6R4	POR	AUT	FIN	FRA	IRE	SWE; 2	BEL	NED	NOR; NC	GBR	GER		20th	17
1993	Clarion Team Europe	Subaru Legacy Turbo	AUT (6)	POR; 4	FRA; 4	IRE (6)	SWE; 4	FIN; 2	BEL; 3	NED (NC)	NOR; 3	GER; 1			4th	106
1994	Clarion Team Europe	Subaru Impreza	AUT; 2	POR; 7	FRA; 3	IRE; 5	GBR; 4	SWE (NC)	FIN; 3	BEL; 7	NED (NC)	NOR (7)	GER; 6		6th	93
1995	Clarion Team Europe	Subaru Impreza	AUT; 2	POR (NC)	FRA; 5	SWE; 3	GBR (7)	IRE (8)	BEL; 4	NED; 5	NOR; 2	FIN (6)	CZE; 2	GER; 3	4th	118
1996	Clarion Team Europe	Subaru Impreza	AUT; 1	POR (9)	FRA; 4	SWE (6)	IRE (7)	GBR; 2	BEL; 3	NED; 5	NOR (6)	CZE; 3	GER (6)		5th	104

==== Division 1^{*} ====
Year	Entrant	Car	1	2	3	4	5	6	7	8	9	10	11	ERX	Points
1997	Clarion Team Europe	Saab 900 Turbo	AUT; 3	FRA (6)	POR (6)	GBR; 3	SWE; 4	FIN (9)	BEL; 5	NOR; 4	CZE; 2	GER; 5		6th	97
1998	Clarion Team Europe	Saab 900 Turbo	AUT; 2	POR; 1	FRA (6)	SWE (4)	GBR; 1	FIN; 3	BEL (8)	NOR; 2	GER; 3	CZE; 3		2nd	119
1999	Clarion Team Europe	Saab 9-3 T16	CZE; 1	FRA; 3	POR; 2	SWE (3)	FIN; 2	BEL; 2	NED; 2	NOR; 1	GER (NC)			1st	123
2000	Clarion Team Europe	Saab 9-3 T16	POR; 1	FRA; 3	CZE; 1	SWE; DNS	BEL; 3	NED; 3	NOR; 7	POL (DSQ)	GER; 2			3rd	102
2001	Clarion Team Europe	Saab 9-3 T16	FRA (11)	POR; 3	AUT; 2	CZE; 2	SWE; DNS	BEL; 4	NED (9)	NOR (6)	POL; 2	GER; 1		3rd	99
2002	Clarion Team Europe	Saab 9-3 T16	POR (5)	FRA; 4	AUT; 1	CZE; 4	SWE; 4	BEL; 1	NED (7)	NOR; 3	POL; 5	GER; 1		2nd	126
2003	Clarion Team Europe	Saab 9-3 T16	POR; 3	FRA (5)	AUT; 2	CZE; 1	SWE; 2	BEL; 2	NED; 7	NOR; 5	POL (7)	GER; 2		2nd	125
2004	Clarion Team Europe	Saab 9-3 T16	POR; 6	FRA; 1	CZE; 5	AUT; 4	NOR (8)	SWE; 7	BEL; 7	NED (10)	POL; 3	GER; 8		5th	100
2005	Clarion Team Europe	Saab 9-3 T16	FRA (9)	POR; 7	AUT; 7	CZE; 5	NOR; 8	SWE; 3	BEL; 4	NED (12)	POL; 4	GER; 7		6th	92
2006	Eklund Motorsport	Saab 9-3 T16	POR; 8	FRA (12)	CZE; 12	AUT; 12	SWE; 7	HUN; 7	BEL; 7	NED; 8	NOR; 8	POL; 11	GER (NC)	9th	73
2007	Eklund Motorsport	Saab 9-3 T16	POR; 4	FRA; 4	HUN; 6	AUT; 9	SWE (11)	NOR (14)	BEL; 14	NED; 14	POL; 4	CZE; 6		8th	75
2008	Eklund Motorsport	Saab 9-3 T16	POR; 6	FRA; 14	HUN (15)	AUT; 9	NOR; 13	SWE; 9	BEL; 12	NED (NC)	CZE; 10	POL; NC	GER; 6	10th	57
2009	Eklund Motorsport	Saab 9-3 T16	GBR; 10	POR; 12	FRA (NC)	HUN; 10	AUT; NC	SWE; 13	BEL; DNS	GER; 12	POL; 14	CZE; NC		14th	31
2010	Eklund Motorsport	Saab 9-3 T16	POR	FRA	GBR	HUN	SWE; 14	FIN; 15	BEL	GER	POL; 10	CZE; 15		22nd	14

^{*} Division 2 was rebranded as Division 1 in 1997.

==== Supercar ====
Year	Entrant	Car	1	2	3	4	5	6	7	8	9	10	ERX	Points
2011	Eklund Motorsport	Saab 9-3	GBR	POR	FRA	NOR	SWE; 24	BEL	NED	AUT	POL	CZE; 7	22nd	10
2013	Eklund Motorsport	Saab 9-3	GBR	POR	HUN	FIN	NOR	SWE	FRA	AUT	GER; 22		45th	0
2014	Eklund Motorsport	Saab 9-3	GBR	NOR	BEL	GER; 22	ITA						37th	0

=== Complete FIA World Rallycross Championship results ===
==== Supercar ====
Year	Entrant	Car	1	2	3	4	5	6	7	8	9	10	11	12	13	WRX	Points
2014	Eklund Motorsport	Saab 9-3	POR	GBR	NOR	FIN	SWE	BEL	CAN	FRA	GER; 30	ITA	TUR	ARG		57th	0
2015	Eklund Motorsport	Saab 9-3	POR	HOC	BEL	GBR	GER	SWE; 24	CAN	NOR	FRA	ESP	TUR	ITA	ARG	35th	0

Sporting positions
Preceded by Kenneth Hansen	European Rallycross Division 1 Champion; 1999	Succeeded by Kenneth Hansen
