= 2025 FIA European Rallycross Championship =

The 2025 FIA European Rallycross Championship was the 50th season of the FIA European Rallycross Championship (ERX). The championship consisted of two classes: RX1 and RX3. The RX2e class was discontinued after the 2024 season.

The championship began on 31 May at the Circuito Automóvel de Lousada in Portugal, and finished on 21 September at Istanbul Park in Turkey. Patrick O'Donovan is the reigning RX1 champion. Nils Volland is the reigning RX3 champion.

== Calendar ==
The calendar was announced by the FIA on Instagram on 27 March 2025. It featured five rounds.

| Rnd | Event | Date | Venue | Class | Winner | Team |
|---|---|---|---|---|---|---|
| 1 | Euro RX of Portugal | 31 May–1 June | Circuito Automóvel de Lousada, Lousada | RX1 | (Switzerland) Yury Belevskiy | (Germany) Volland Racing |
| 1 | Euro RX of Portugal | 31 May–1 June | Circuito Automóvel de Lousada, Lousada | RX3 | (Portugal) João Ribeiro | (Portugal) João Ribeiro |
| 2 | Euro RX of Sweden | 5–6 July | Höljesbanan, Höljes | RX1 | (Switzerland) Yury Belevskiy | (Germany) Volland Racing |
| 2 | Euro RX of Sweden | 5–6 July | Höljesbanan, Höljes | RX3 | (Lithuania) Rytis Gurklys | (Lithuania) NG Racing Team |
| 3 | Euro RX of Hungary | 19–20 July | Nyirád Racing Center, Nyirád | RX1 | (Hungary) Zoltán Koncseg | (Hungary) Nyirad Racing Center Nonprofit Kft |
| 3 | Euro RX of Hungary | 19–20 July | Nyirád Racing Center, Nyirád | RX3 | (Portugal) João Ribeiro | (Portugal) João Ribeiro |
| 4 | Euro RX of Finland | 23–24 August | Kymiring, Kausala | RX1 | (Estonia) Maiko Tamm | (Estonia) Tamm Racing |
| 4 | Euro RX of Finland | 23–24 August | Kymiring, Kausala | RX3 | (Portugal) João Ribeiro | (Portugal) João Ribeiro |
| 5 | Euro RX of Turkey | 20–21 September | TOSFED İstanbul Park, Istanbul | RX1 | (Poland) Damian Litwinowicz | (Poland) Automax Motorsport |
| 5 | Euro RX of Turkey | 20–21 September | TOSFED İstanbul Park, Istanbul | RX3 | (Lithuania) Rytis Gurklys | (Lithuania) NG Racing Team |

== Entries ==
=== RX1 ===
| Constructor | Team | Car | No. | Driver | Rounds | Ref |
|---|---|---|---|---|---|---|
| Audi | (Hungary) Nyirad Racing Center Nonprofit Kft | Audi S1 RX | 9 | (Hungary) Zoltán Koncseg | 3 | |
| Audi | (Hungary) Nyirad Racing Center Nonprofit Kft | Audi S1 RX | 73 | (Hungary) Tamás Kárai | 3, 5 | |
| Audi | (Germany) Volland Racing | Audi S1 RX | 30 | (Germany) Nils Volland | All | |
| Audi | (Germany) Volland Racing | Audi S1 RX | 95 | (Switzerland) Yury Belevskiy | All | |
| Audi | (Poland) Automax Motorsport | Audi S1 RX | 66 | (Poland) Damian Litwinowicz | All | |
| Ford | (Portugal) Cesar Pereira | Ford Fiesta RX | 8 | (Portugal) Cesar Pereira | 1 | |
| Ford | (Estonia) Tamm Racing | Ford Fiesta RX | 11 | (Estonia) Maiko Tamm | 4 | |
| Ford | (Finland) Joni Turpeinen | Ford Fiesta RX | 20 | (Finland) Joni Turpeinen | 2, 4 | |
| Ford | (Hungary) Nyirad Motorsport Kft | Ford Fiesta RX | 50 | (Hungary) Attila Mózer | 3, 5 | |
| Ford | (Hungary) Nyirad Motorsport Kft | Ford Fiesta RX | 51 | (Hungary) Mark Mózer | 3, 5 | |
| Ford | (Sweden) Martin Enlund | Ford Fiesta RX | 60 | (Sweden) Martin Enlund | 1–2, 4 | |
| Ford | (Finland) SET Promotion | Ford Fiesta RX | 99 | (Sweden) Lukas Andersson | 2 | |
| Hyundai | (France) PGRX | Hyundai i20 RX | 20 | (Finland) Joni Turpeinen | 5 | |
| Hyundai | (Finland) Mika Liimatainen | Hyundai i20 RX | 37 | (Finland) Mika Liimatainen | All | |
| Hyundai | (Finland) Mikko Ikonen | Hyundai i20 RX | 76 | (Finland) Mikko Ikonen | 2, 4 | |
| Peugeot | (Sweden) Hedström Motorsport | Peugeot 208 RX | 8 | (Sweden) Peter Hedström | 2 | |
| Peugeot | (Portugal) José Oliveira | Peugeot 208 RX | 10 | (Portugal) José Oliveira | 1 | |
| Peugeot | (Hungary) Speedbox Racing Team KFT. | Peugeot 208 RX | 27 | (Hungary) László Kiss | 1–3 | |
| Peugeot | (Portugal) SRT RX Team | Peugeot 208 RX | 29 | (Portugal) Antonio Sousa | 1 | |
| Renault | (Hungary) TRX Motorsport | Renault Mégane RX | 88 | (Hungary) Andor Trépak | 3 | |
| SEAT | (Germany) All-Inkl.com Münnich Motorsport | SEAT Ibiza RX | 38 | (Germany) Mandie August | 2–3, 5 | |
| SEAT | (Germany) All-Inkl.com Münnich Motorsport | SEAT Ibiza RX | 77 | (Germany) René Münnich | 2–5 | |
| Škoda | (Hungary) Glasstone Trans KFT | Škoda Fabia RX | 7 | (Hungary) Krisztián Pál | 2 | |
| Škoda | (Hungary) Proex Autó Ès Motorsport | Škoda Fabia RX | 18 | (Hungary) Ottó Horváth | 3 | |
| Škoda | (Finland) Anton Seppä | Škoda Fabia RX | 24 | (Finland) Anton Seppä | 4 | |
| Volkswagen | (Sweden) JC Raceteknik | Volkswagen Polo | 17 | (Sweden) Mats Öhman | 2, 4 | |
| Volkswagen | (Sweden) Hedström Motorsport | Volkswagen Polo | 28 | (Sweden) Filip Thorén | 2 | |
| Volkswagen | (Finland) Iivari Niemi | Volkswagen Polo | 74 | (Finland) Iivari Niemi | 4 | |

=== RX3 ===
| Constructor | Team | Car | No. | Driver | Rounds | Ref |
|---|---|---|---|---|---|---|
| Audi | (Czech Republic) Libor Teješ | Audi A1 | 14 | (Czech Republic) Libor Teješ | 1–4 | |
| Audi | (Lithuania) NG Racing Team | Audi A1 | 22 | (Lithuania) Rytis Gurklys | All | |
| Audi | (Germany) Volland Racing | Audi A1 | 26 | (Antigua and Barbuda) Nicolas Geleyns | All | |
| Audi | (Portugal) João Ribeiro | Audi A1 | 99 | (Portugal) João Ribeiro | All | |
| Audi | (Portugal) André Sousa | Audi A1 | 104 | (Portugal) André Sousa | All | |
| Audi | (Portugal) Joaquim Machado | Audi A1 | 146 | (Portugal) Joaquim Machado | 1 | |
| Citroën | (Portugal) Ricardo Costa | Citroën C3 S1600 | 36 | (Portugal) Ricardo Costa | 1 | |
| Ford | (Portugal) Rogerio Sousa | Ford Fiesta | 105 | (Portugal) Rogerio Sousa | All | |
| Peugeot | (Portugal) Rafaela Barbosa | Peugeot 208 | 76 | (Portugal) Rafaela Barbosa | 1 | |
| Peugeot | (Portugal) SRT RX Team | Peugeot 208 | 106 | (Portugal) Antonio Sousa Jr. | 1 | |
| Peugeot | (Portugal) SRT RX Team | Peugeot 208 | 147 | (Portugal) Leonel Sampaio | 1–2 | |
| Peugeot | (Portugal) Tiago Ferreira | Peugeot 208 | 128 | (Portugal) Tiago Ferreira | 2 | |
| Renault | (Portugal) Luis Pedro Ferreira | Renault Twingo | 118 | (Portugal) Luis Pedro Ferreira | 1 | |
| Škoda | (Hungary) Korda Racing | Škoda Fabia | 7 | (Hungary) Sámuel Kovács | All | |
| Škoda | (Czech Republic) KRTZ Motorsport | Škoda Fabia | 28 | (Austria) Josef Strebinger | 2 | |
| Škoda | (Czech Republic) KRTZ Motorsport | Škoda Fabia | 58 | (Austria) Dominic Senegacnik | 1–3 | |
| Škoda | (Czech Republic) Václav Tuma | Škoda Fabia | 88 | (Czech Republic) Václav Tuma | 1–3 | |
| Škoda | (Portugal) José A. Teixeira | Škoda Fabia | 119 | (Portugal) José A. Teixeira | 1 | |
| Škoda | (Norway) Markus Røsrud | Škoda Fabia | 195 | (Norway) Markus Røsrud | 2 | |
| Suzuki | (Hungary) Speedy Motorsport | Suzuki Swift | 110 | (Hungary) Levente Kacor | 2–3 | |
| Volkswagen | (Hungary) Nyirad Racing Center Nonprofit Kft | Volkswagen Polo | 2 | (Hungary) Tamás Végh | 3 | |
| Volkswagen | (Hungary) Szada Ring Racing KFT. | Volkswagen Polo | 131 | (Hungary) Balázs Körmöczi | 1–4 | |

== Championship standings ==
Points are scored as follows:

| Position | 1st | 2nd | 3rd | 4th | 5th | 6th | 7th | 8th | 9th | 10th | 11th | 12th | 13th | 14th | 15th | 16th | 17th | 18th |
|---|---|---|---|---|---|---|---|---|---|---|---|---|---|---|---|---|---|---|
| Final points | 25 | 20 | 17 | 15 | 14 | 13 | 12 | 11 | 10 | 9 | 8 | 7 | 6 | 5 | 4 | 3 | 2 | 1 |
| Heat ranking | 3 | 2 | 1 | | | | | | | | | | | | | | | |

=== RX1 Championship ===
| Pos. | Driver | PRT (Portugal) | SWE (Sweden) | HUN (Hungary) | FIN (Finland) | TÜR (Turkey) | Points |
|---|---|---|---|---|---|---|---|
| 1 | (Switzerland) Yury Belevskiy | 1^{1} | 1 | 6 | 4^{1} | 7^{3} | 97 |
| 2 | (Poland) Damian Litwinowicz | 2 | 4 | 3^{2} | 5^{3} | 1 | 94 |
| 2 | (Finland) Mika Liimatainen | 3^{2} | 3^{1} | 2^{1} | 7 | 3^{1} | 94 |
| 4 | (Germany) Nils Volland | 7^{3} | 8 | 4 | 10 | 6 | 61 |
| 5 | (Sweden) Martin Enlund | 4 | 7^{3} | | 6^{2} | | 43 |
| 6 | (Germany) René Münnich | | 11 | 8 | 12 | 5 | 40 |
| 7 | (Finland) Joni Turpeinen | | 5 | | 9 | 4 | 39 |
| 8 | (Hungary) Tamás Kárai | | | 5 | | 2^{2} | 36 |
| 9 | (Hungary) László Kiss | 5 | 12 | 10 | | | 30 |
| 10 | (Finland) Mikko Ikonen | | 9 | | 3 | | 27 |
| 11 | (Sweden) Mats Öhman | | 13 | | 2 | | 26 |
| 12 | (Estonia) Maiko Tamm | | | | 1 | | 25 |
| 13 | (Hungary) Zoltán Koncseg | | | 1 | | | 25 |
| 14 | (Hungary) Attila Mózer | | | 7 | | 8 | 23 |
| 15 | (Sweden) Lukas Andersson | | 2^{2} | | | | 22 |
| 16 | (Hungary) Mark Mózer | | | 9 | | 9 | 20 |
| 17 | (Germany) Mandie August | | 14 | 13 | | 10 | 20 |
| 18 | (Portugal) José Oliveira | 6 | | | | | 13 |
| 19 | (Sweden) Peter Hedström | | 6 | | | | 13 |
| 20 | (Portugal) Antonio Sousa | 8 | | | | | 11 |
| 21 | (Finland) Iivari Niemi | | | | 8 | | 11 |
| 22 | (Portugal) Cesar Pereira | 9 | | | | | 10 |
| 23 | (Sweden) Filip Thorén | | 10 | | | | 9 |
| 24 | (Hungary) Andor Trépak | | | 11^{3} | | | 9 |
| 25 | (Finland) Anton Seppä | | | | 11 | | 8 |
| 26 | (Hungary) Ottó Horváth | | | 12 | | | 7 |
| 27 | (Hungary) Krisztián Pál | | 15 | | | | 4 |
| Pos. | Driver | PRT (Portugal) | SWE (Sweden) | HUN (Hungary) | FIN (Finland) | TÜR (Turkey) | Points |

| Colour | Result |
|---|---|
| Gold | Winner |
| Silver | Second place |
| Bronze | Third place |
| Green | Points classification |
| Blue | Non-points classification |
| Blue | Non-classified finish (NC) |
| Purple | Retired, not classified (Ret) |
| Red | Did not qualify (DNQ) |
| Red | Did not pre-qualify (DNPQ) |
| Black | Disqualified (DSQ) |
| White | Did not start (DNS) |
| White | Withdrew (WD) |
| White | Race cancelled (C) |
| Blank | Did not practice (DNP) |
| Blank | Did not arrive (DNA) |
| Blank | Excluded (EX) |

In-line notation
| ^{1–3} | Top 3 heat ranking |

=== RX3 Championship ===
| Pos. | Driver | PRT (Portugal) | SWE (Sweden) | HUN (Hungary) | FIN (Finland) | TÜR (Turkey) | Points |
|---|---|---|---|---|---|---|---|
| 1 | (Portugal) João Ribeiro | 1^{1} | 7^{3} | 1^{1} | 1 | 6 | 107 |
| 2 | (Lithuania) Rytis Gurklys | 6 | 1^{2} | 5 | 6^{1} | 1^{1} | 98 |
| 3 | (Antigua and Barbuda) Nicolas Geleyns | 8 | 2 | 7 | 2 | 2^{2} | 85 |
| 4 | (Hungary) Sámuel Kovács | 3 | 12 | 3 | 5 | 4^{3} | 71 |
| 5 | (Portugal) André Sousa | 2 | 9 | 10 | 8^{3} | 3 | 68 |
| 6 | (Portugal) Rogerio Sousa | 9 | 10 | 9 | 3 | 5 | 60 |
| 7 | (Hungary) Balázs Körmöczi | 7 | 8 | 2^{3} | 7^{2} | | 58 |
| 8 | (Czech Republic) Libor Teješ | 5^{3} | 5 | 6 | 4 | | 57 |
| 9 | (Czech Republic) Václav Tuma | 12 | 6 | 4 | | | 35 |
| 10 | (Austria) Dominic Senegacnik | 16 | 4 | 11^{2} | | | 28 |
| 11 | (Portugal) Tiago Ferreira | | 3 | | | | 17 |
| 12 | (Portugal) Joaquim Machado | 4^{2} | | | | | 17 |
| 13 | (Hungary) Levante Kacor | | 13 | 8 | | | 17 |
| 14 | (Portugal) Leonel Sampaio | 11 | 15 | | | | 12 |
| 15 | (Norway) Markus Røsrud | | 11^{1} | | | | 11 |
| 16 | (Portugal) José A. Teixeira | 10 | | | | | 9 |
| 17 | (Hungary) Tamás Végh | | | 12 | | | 7 |
| 18 | (Portugal) Antonio Sousa Jr. | 13 | | | | | 6 |
| 19 | (Portugal) Rafaela Barbosa | 14 | | | | | 5 |
| 20 | (Austria) Josef Strebinger | | 14 | | | | 5 |
| 21 | (Portugal) Luis Pedro Ferreira | 15 | | | | | 4 |
| 22 | (Portugal) Ricardo Costa | 17 | | | | | 2 |
| Pos. | Driver | PRT (Portugal) | SWE (Sweden) | HUN (Hungary) | FIN (Finland) | TÜR (Turkey) | Points |

| Colour | Result |
|---|---|
| Gold | Winner |
| Silver | Second place |
| Bronze | Third place |
| Green | Points classification |
| Blue | Non-points classification |
| Blue | Non-classified finish (NC) |
| Purple | Retired, not classified (Ret) |
| Red | Did not qualify (DNQ) |
| Red | Did not pre-qualify (DNPQ) |
| Black | Disqualified (DSQ) |
| White | Did not start (DNS) |
| White | Withdrew (WD) |
| White | Race cancelled (C) |
| Blank | Did not practice (DNP) |
| Blank | Did not arrive (DNA) |
| Blank | Excluded (EX) |

In-line notation
| ^{1–3} | Top 3 heat ranking |
