= Roman Častoral =

Czech rally driver (born 1976)

- Nationality: (Czech Republic) Czech
- Born: 9 June 1976 (age 50) Strakonice, Czech Republic

FIA ERX TouringCar Championship
- Years active: 2011–2013
- Former teams: Czech National Team
- Starts: 27
- Wins: 4
- Podiums: 19
- Best finish: 2nd in 2011

FIA ERX Division 2 Championship
- Years active: 1997–2010
- Former teams: Czech National Team
- Starts: 123
- Championships: 1 (2006)
- Wins: 14
- Podiums: 41

Roman Častoral (born September 6, 1976) is a Czech rallycross driver. He has previously won the 2006 EuroRX Division 2 Championship.

== Racing record ==
=== Complete FIA European Rallycross Championship results ===
==== Division 1^{*} ====
Year	Entrant	Car	1	2	3	4	5	6	7	8	9	10	11	ERX	Points
1996	Roman Častoral	Ford Escort RS Cosworth	AUT	POR	FRA	SWE	IRE	GBR	BEL; 16	NED	NOR	CZE; 11	GER	30th	7

^{*} Division 1 was rebranded as Division 2 in 1997.

==== Division 2 ====
Year	Entrant	Car	1	2	3	4	5	6	7	8	9	10	11	ERX	Points
1997	Roman Častoral	Ford Escort RS Cosworth	AUT; 11	FRA; 9	POR; 4	GBR (6)	SWE; 9	FIN; 4	BEL; 9	NOR (12)	CZE; 8	GER (14)		8th	65
1998	Roman Častoral	Ford Escort RS Cosworth	AUT; 10	POR; 7	FRA; 9	SWE; 14	GBR	FIN; 7	BEL; 6	NOR	GER; 8	CZE; 10		7th	62
1999	Roman Častoral	Nissan Sunny GTi	CZE; 7	FRA; 12	POR; 3	SWE; 7	FIN; 7	BEL; 8	NED (12)	NOR; 7	GER			8th	69
2000	Roman Častoral	SEAT Ibiza GTI	POR; 6	FRA; 14	CZE; 11	SWE; 14	BEL (14)	NED; 11	NOR	POL; 9	GER; 13			13th	41
2001	Roman Častoral	SEAT Ibiza GTI	FRA	POR	AUT; 9	CZE	SWE	BEL	NED	NOR	POL	GER		34th	8
2002	Roman Častoral	SEAT Ibiza GTI	POR; 7	FRA; 10	AUT; 4	CZE; 8	SWE	BEL; 7	NED; 6	NOR; 10	POL; 6	GER (14)		7th	78
2002	Roman Častoral	SEAT Ibiza GTI	POR; 8	FRA (NC)										5th	90
2002	Roman Častoral	Opel Astra G OPC			AUT; 5	CZE; NC	SWE; 5	BEL; 5	NED; 4	NOR	POL; 4	GER; 1		5th	90
2004	Roman Častoral	Opel Astra G OPC	POR; 6	FRA (10)	CZE; 2	AUT; 4	NOR; 3	SWE; 3	BEL; 3	NED (6)	POL; 3	GER; 5		4th	113
2005	Roman Častoral	Opel Astra G OPC	FRA; 4	POR (10)	AUT; 2	CZE; 6	NOR; 3	SWE (6)	BEL; 2	NED; 4	POL; 2	GER; 3		4th	118
2006	Czech National Team	Opel Astra G OPC	POR; 2	FRA; 2	CZE; 1	AUT; 2	SWE (3)	HUN; 1	BEL; 1	NED; 1	NOR (6)	POL; 1	GER; 2	1st	168
2007	Czech National Team	Opel Astra G OPC	POR (5)	FRA; 4	HUN; 1	AUT; 1	SWE; 3	NOR (6)	BEL; 6	NED; 1	POL; 4	CZE; 1		2nd	132
2008	Czech National Team	Opel Astra G OPC	POR; 3	FRA; 2	HUN; 1	AUT; 1	NOR; 2	SWE (6)	BEL; 1	NED (2)	CZE; 2	POL; 2	GER; 1	2nd	163
2009	Czech National Team	Opel Astra G OPC	GBR (5)	POR; 4	FRA; 5	HUN; 4	AUT; 4	SWE; 4	BEL; 3	GER (10)	POL; 3	CZE; 3		4th	109
2010	Czech National Team	Opel Astra G OPC	POR; 4	FRA; 4	GBR; 3	HUN; 4	SWE	FIN	BEL; 7	GER; 5	POL; 4	CZE; 4		5th	102

==== Touringcar ====
Year	Entrant	Car	1	2	3	4	5	6	7	8	9	10	ERX	Points
2011	Czech National Team	Opel Astra G OPC	GBR; 2	POR; 4	FRA; 5	NOR	SWE; 5	BEL; 1	NED; 1	AUT; 1	POL (2)	CZE; 2	2nd	131
2012	Czech National Team	Opel Astra G OPC	GBR; 2	FRA; 3	AUT; 3	HUN; 3	NOR	SWE; 7	BEL; 4	NED (13)	FIN; 3	GER; 3	3rd	115
2013	Czech National Team	Opel Astra G OPC	GBR; 3	POR; 3	HUN; 2	FIN; 1	NOR; 7	SWE; 3	FRA; 3	AUT; 3	GER; 9		3rd	168

Sporting positions
Preceded by Jussi Pinomäki	European Rallycross Division 2 Champion; 2006	Succeeded by Tomáš Kotek
