= FIA European Rallycross Championship =

Rallycross competition

- Category: Supercar, Super1600 and TouringCar
- Country: Europe
- Inaugural season: 1976
- Drivers' champion: (Switzerland) Yury Belevskiy (RX1) (Portugal) João Ribeiro (RX3)
- Official website: www.fiaworldrallycross.com

The European Rallycross Championship (former abbreviation ERC, now Euro RX or ERX) is a rallycross competition held in Europe, organised by the FIA.

== History ==
The predecessor championship began in 1973 as the Embassy/ERA European Rallycross Championship. In 1976 the FIA created regulations for rallycross, including Group 5 regulations for the cars, and awarded the first official European cup. For 1978 two classes became introduced, one class for Touring cars and one for Grand Touring cars, but the FIA European Cup was for the driver with the most scored points from both Divisions, Norwegian Martin Schanche. In 1979 Schanche claimed the first ever true FIA European Championship title.

In 1982 the FIA reorganized the classes into Division 1, for Group A but restricted to two-wheel drive, and Division 2 for the so-called Rallycross Specials, which allowed the use of four-wheel drive. The first European Champions under these new rules became Norwegian Egil Stenshagen and Austrian Franz Wurz (father of ex-Formula One driver Alexander Wurz).

After several major accidents, Group B cars were banned from the WRC at the end of 1986, but found their new home in the European Rallycross Championship in 1987. Division 1 continued to use only two-wheel drive touring cars, but the Division 2 received the exotic Group B machinery such as the Peugeot 205 Turbo 16 E2, Ford RS200 E2, Lancia Delta S4, Audi Sport Quattro S1 or MG Metro 6R4, which continued to be prepared past their highest point of evolution in rallying.

Beginning in the 1993 season, the Group B cars disappeared and the four-wheel drive "specials" came into the era. Division 1 was now open to four-wheel drive cars, but using Group N regulations. Division 2 was based in Group A, but allowing several extra modifications such as changing to a different engine produced by the same manufacturer, adding a turbocharger or four-wheel drive. This allowed the creation of machines based on the Citroën Xantia, Peugeot 306 or Ford Escort RS2000. A third division was added, for two-wheel drive cars up to 1.4 litres, called 1400 Cup, but the title was recognized by the FIA only in 1995.

In 1997, the divisions were swapped, with Division 1 now becoming the primary class, with Group A-based cars, and Group N moving to Division 2. In 1999, Division 1 was allowed cars based on WRC and Supertouring regulations, but with the same set of freedoms as the Group A (adding turbochargers and four-wheel drive where needed). Division 2 kept Group N, but with a maximum displacement of 2.0 litres and only two-wheel drive. In 2001 the 1400 Cup's status was upgraded to Division 2A.

For 2003, the class format was revised once more, assuming the form that is currently used. Division 1 and Division 2 remain essentially identical, with 4WD turbocharged Group A "specials" and 2WD normally aspirated 2.0 litre Group N cars, respectively, but a new Division 1A was created to replace the 1400 Cup, with regular Group A cars up to 1.6 litres.

In 2013 the European Rallycross Championship was promoted for the first time by IMG Motorsports. Rebranded as RallycrossRX (brand is not in official use any longer) the championship underwent changes to the racing format.

In 2014, the FIA approved plans for the championship to become a fully sanctioned FIA World Championship. Together with the creation of the FIA World Rallycross Championship (World RX), the European Rallycross Championship (Euro RX) was restructured into a five round championship Supercar series with races in Great Britain, Norway, Belgium, Germany and Italy, while all nine rounds of the World RX to be held in Europe count for the European titles of the Super1600 and TouringCar drivers.

== Champions ==
Year		Overall							
1976	1.	(Austria) Franz Wurz	Lancia Stratos HF 2.4						
1976	2.	(Netherlands) Kees Teurlings	Porsche 911 Carrera						
1976	3.	(Sweden) Rolf Nilsson	Porsche 911 Carrera						
1977	1.	(Austria) Herbert Grünsteidl	Alpine A310 16V; Alpine A310 V6						
1977	2.	(Norway) Per Engseth	Porsche 911 Carrera						
1977	3.	(Sweden) Stig Emilsson	Porsche 911 Turbo						
1978	1.	(Norway) Martin Schanche (FIA European Cup winner)	Ford Escort RS1800						
1978	2.	(Austria) Andy Bentza (GT Division winner)	Lancia Stratos HF 3.0						
1978	3.	(Sweden) Åke Andersson	Porsche 911 Carrera						
Year		TC Division		GT Division					
1979	1.	(Norway) Martin Schanche	Ford Escort RS1800	(Sweden) Olle Arnesson	Porsche 911 Carrera				
1979	2.	(Netherlands) Jan de Rooy	Ford Escort RS1800	(Norway) Per Engseth	Porsche 911 Carrera				
1979	3.	(Sweden) Anders Hultqvist	VW 1303S Turbo	(Austria) Andy Bentza	Lancia Stratos HF 3.0				
1980	1.	(Sweden) Per-Inge Walfridsson	Volvo 343 Turbo	(Sweden) Olle Arnesson	Porsche 911 SC				
1980	2.	(Norway) Martin Schanche	Ford Escort RS1800	(Austria) Andy Bentza	Lancia Stratos HF 3.0				
1980	3.	(Norway) Per Engseth	Volvo 343 Turbo	(Finland) Matti Alamäki	Porsche 911 SC				
1981	1.	(Norway) Martin Schanche	Ford Escort RS1800 Turbo	(Finland) Matti Alamäki	Porsche 911 SC				
1981	2.	(Netherlands) Piet Dam	BMW 320i	(Sweden) Olle Arnesson	Porsche 911 SC				
1981	3.	(Sweden) Per-Inge Walfridsson	Volvo 343/16 Turbo	(Austria) Andy Bentza	Lancia Stratos HF 3.0				
Year		Division 1		Division 2					
1982	1.	(Norway) Egil Stenshagen	Volkswagen Golf GTi 1.6	(Austria) Franz Wurz	Audi Quattro				
1982	2.	(Norway) Svein Hagen	Talbot Rallye 3	(Norway) Martin Schanche	Ford Escort RS1800 Turbo				
1982	3.	(Norway) Knut Boberg	Volkswagen Golf GTi	(Netherlands) Jan de Rooy	Audi Quattro				
1983	1.	(Norway) Egil Stenshagen	Volkswagen Golf GTi 1.8	(Sweden) Olle Arnesson	Audi Quattro				
1983	2.	(Sweden) Lars Nyström	Volvo 240 Turbo	(Sweden) Rolf Nilsson	Porsche 911 SC				
1983	3.	(Norway) Ludvig Hunsbedt	Opel Ascona i2000	(Finland) Seppo Niittymäki	Porsche 911 BiTurbo				
1984	1.	(Sweden) Anders Norstedt	Saab 900 Turbo	(Norway) Martin Schanche	Ford Escort XR3 T16 4x4				
1984	2.	(Sweden) Lars Nyström	Volvo 240 Turbo	(Finland) Seppo Niittymäki	Porsche 911 BiTurbo 4x4				
1984	3.	(Norway) Bjørn Skogstad	Opel Ascona i2000	(Sweden) Olle Arnesson	Audi Quattro				
1985	1.	(Sweden) Anders Norstedt	Saab 900 Turbo	(Finland) Matti Alamäki	Porsche 911 BiTurbo 4x4				
1985	2.	(Sweden) Lars Nyström	Volvo 240 Turbo	(Norway) Martin Schanche	Ford Escort XR3 Turbo 4x4				
1985	3.	(Norway) Bjørn Skogstad	Opel Ascona i2000	(Sweden) Olle Arnesson	Audi Quattro				
1986	1.	(Sweden) Anders Norstedt	Saab 900 Turbo	(Sweden) Olle Arnesson	Audi Quattro 20V				
1986	2.	(Sweden) Per-Ove Davidsson	Volvo 240 Turbo	(Norway) Martin Schanche	Ford Escort XR3 T16 4x4				
1986	3.	(United Kingdom) Trevor Reeves	Ford Escort RS Turbo	(Finland) Matti Alamäki	Porsche 911 BiTurbo 4x4				
1987	1.	(Sweden) Per-Ove Davidsson	Volvo 240 Turbo	(Finland) Seppo Niittymäki	Peugeot 205 T16 E2				
1987	2.	(Austria) Herbert Breiteneder	Volkswagen Golf GTi 16V	(Finland) Matti Alamäki	Lancia Delta S4				
1987	3.	(Sweden) Anders Norstedt	Saab 900 Turbo	(Sweden) Olle Arnesson	Audi Sport Quattro S1				
1988	1.	(Norway) Bjørn Skogstad	Ford Sierra RS500 Cosworth	(Finland) Matti Alamäki	Peugeot 205 T16 E2				
1988	2.	(Austria) Herbert Breiteneder	Volkswagen Golf GTi 16V	(Norway) Martin Schanche	Ford RS200 E2				
1988	3.	(Sweden) Anders Norstedt	Saab 900 Turbo 16	(United Kingdom) Will Gollop	MG Metro 6R4				
1989	1.	(Sweden) Kenneth Hansen	Ford Sierra RS500 Cosworth	(Finland) Matti Alamäki	Peugeot 205 T16 E2				
1989	2.	(Norway) Bjørn Skogstad	Ford Sierra RS500 Cosworth	(Norway) Martin Schanche	Ford RS200 E2				
1989	3.	(United Kingdom) Trevor Reeves	Ford Sierra RS500 Cosworth	(United Kingdom) Will Gollop	MG Metro 6R4				
1990	1.	(Sweden) Kenneth Hansen	Ford Sierra RS500 Cosworth	(Finland) Matti Alamäki	Peugeot 205 T16 E2				
1990	2.	(Norway) Bjørn Skogstad	Ford Sierra RS500 Cosworth	(Norway) Martin Schanche	Ford RS200 E2				
1990	3.	(Sweden) Bengt Ekström	BMW M3	(United Kingdom) Will Gollop	MG Metro 6R4				
1991	1.	(Sweden) Kenneth Hansen	Ford Sierra RS500 Cosworth	(Norway) Martin Schanche	Ford RS200 E2				
1991	2.	(Norway) Bjørn Skogstad	Ford Sierra RS500 Cosworth	(United Kingdom) Will Gollop	MG Metro 6R4 BiTurbo				
1991	3.	(Norway) Steinar Jøranli	Opel Kadett GSi 16V	(Norway) Thor Holm	Ford RS200 E2				
1992	1.	(Sweden) Kenneth Hansen	Ford Sierra RS500 Cosworth	(United Kingdom) Will Gollop	MG Metro 6R4 BiTurbo				
1992	2.	(Norway) Bjørn Skogstad	Ford Sierra RS500 Cosworth	(United Kingdom) Pat Doran	Ford RS200 E2				
1992	3.	(Sweden) Michael Jernberg	Ford Sierra RS500 Cosworth	(Finland) Pekka Rantanen	Ford RS200 E2				
Year		Division 1		Division 2		1400 Cup			
1993	1.	(Norway) Ludvig Hunsbedt	Ford Escort RS Cosworth	(France) Jean-Luc Pailler	Citroën BX GTi T16 4x4	(Belgium) Tony Kuypers	Citroën AX GT; Citroën AX Sport		
1993	2.	(Norway) Eivind Opland	Nissan Sunny GTI-R	(Sweden) Kenneth Hansen	Citroën ZX T16 4x4	(Austria) Manfred Beck	Citroën AX Sport		
1993	3.	(United Kingdom) Richard Hutton	Ford Escort RS Cosworth	(Sweden) Tommy Kristoffersson	Audi Coupé S2 20V	(Czech Republic) Pavel Novotný	Citroën AX Sport		
1994	1.	(United Kingdom) Richard Hutton	Ford Escort RS Cosworth	(Sweden) Kenneth Hansen	Citroën ZX T16 4x4	(Sweden) Susann Bergvall	Citroën AX Sport		
1994	2.	(Germany) Bernd Leinemann	Ford Escort RS Cosworth	(Norway) Martin Schanche	Ford Escort RS2000 T16 4x4	(Austria) Manfred Beck	Citroën AX Sport		
1994	3.	(Norway) Ludvig Hunsbedt	Ford Escort RS Cosworth	(France) Jean-Luc Pailler	Citroën Xantia T16 4x4	(Belgium) Rudy Lauwers	Peugeot 205 Rallye		
1995	1.	(Norway) Eivind Opland	Mitsubishi Lancer Evolution II	(Norway) Martin Schanche	Ford Escort RS2000 T16 4x4	(Netherlands) Ko Kasse	Citroën AX GTi		
1995	2.	(Netherlands) Jos Kuypers	Mitsubishi Lancer Evolution II	(Sweden) Kenneth Hansen	Citroën ZX T16 4x4	(Austria) Manfred Beck	Citroën AX Sport		
1995	3.	(Sweden) Gunde Svan	Toyota Celica GT-Four	(France) Jean-Luc Pailler	Citroën Xantia T16 4x4	(Czech Republic) Pavel Novotný	Citroën AX GTi		
1996	1.	(Norway) Eivind Opland	Mitsubishi Lancer Evolution III	(Sweden) Kenneth Hansen	Citroën ZX T16 4x4	(Austria) Manfred Beck	Citroën AX GTi		
1996	2.	(Sweden) Lasse Sällström	Mitsubishi Lancer Evolution III	(Norway) Ludvig Hunsbedt	Ford Escort RS2000 T16 4x4	(Netherlands) Ko Kasse	Citroën AX GTi		
1996	3.	(Netherlands) Jos Kuypers	Mitsubishi Lancer Evolution III	(France) Jean-Luc Pailler	Citroën Xantia T16 4x4	(Germany) Sven Seeliger	Citroën AX GTi		
Year		Division 1		Division 2		1400 Cup (Div. 2A)			
1997	1.	(Norway) Ludvig Hunsbedt	Ford Escort RS2000 T16 4x4	(Norway) Eivind Opland	Mitsubishi Lancer Evolution III	(Czech Republic) Jaroslav Kalný	Peugeot 106 Rallye		
1997	2.	(Sweden) Kenneth Hansen	Citroën ZX T16 4x4	(Czech Republic) Pavel Koutný	Ford Escort RS Cosworth	(Germany) Sven Seeliger	Citroën AX GTi		
1997	3.	(Norway) Martin Schanche	Ford Escort RS2000 T16 4x4	(Sweden) Lasse Sällström	Mitsubishi Lancer Evolution III	(Czech Republic) Vlastimil Boháček	Peugeot 106 XSi		
1998	1.	(Sweden) Kenneth Hansen	Citroën Xsara VTS T16 4x4	(Norway) Eivind Opland	Mitsubishi Lancer Evolution V	(Czech Republic) Jaroslav Kalný	Peugeot 106 Rallye		
1998	2.	(Sweden) Per Eklund	Saab 900 T16 4x4	(Netherlands) Jos Kuypers	Mitsubishi Lancer Evolution III	(Sweden) Magnus Hansen	Citroën AX GTi		
1998	3.	(Norway) Martin Schanche	Ford Escort RS2000 T16 4x4	(Norway) Bjørn Skogstad	Mitsubishi Lancer Evolution III	(Belgium) Jean-Michel Laurant	Peugeot 106 XSi		
1999	1.	(Sweden) Per Eklund	Saab 9-3 T16 4x4	(Sweden) Magnus Hansen	Citroën Xsara VTS	(Denmark) Johnny Jensen	Citroën AX GTi		
1999	2.	(Sweden) Kenneth Hansen	Citroën Xsara VTS T16 4x4	(Czech Republic) Jaroslav Kalný	Peugeot 306 S16	(Belgium) Jean-Michel Laurant	Peugeot 106 XSi		
1999	3.	(Norway) Ludvig Hunsbedt	Ford Escort RS2000 T16 4x4	(Czech Republic) Pavel Novotný	Citroën Xsara VTS	(Czech Republic) Jaroslav Marchal	Volkswagen Polo 1.4 16V		
2000	1.	(Sweden) Kenneth Hansen	Citroën Xsara WRC	(France) Eddy Bénézet	Peugeot 306 S16	(Germany) Sven Seeliger	Citroën AX GTi		
2000	2.	(France) Jean-Luc Pailler	Peugeot 206 WRC	(Finland) Jouko Kallio	Honda Integra Type R	(Belgium) Michaël De Keersmaecker	Peugeot 106 XSi		
2000	3.	(Sweden) Per Eklund	Saab 9-3 T16 4x4	(Sweden) Magnus Hansen	Citroën Xsara VTS	(Czech Republic) Jaroslav Marchal	Volkswagen Polo 1.4 16V		
2001	1.	(Sweden) Kenneth Hansen	Citroën Xsara WRC	(Belgium) Ronny Scheveneels	Volkswagen Golf GTI 16V	(Germany) Sven Seeliger	Citroën AX GTi		
2001	2.	(Norway) Ludvig Hunsbedt	Ford Focus WRC	(Sweden) Magnus Hansen	Citroën Xsara VTS	(Poland) Tomasz Oleksiak	Peugeot 106 XSi		
2001	3.	(Sweden) Per Eklund	Saab 9-3 T16 4x4	(Norway) Guttorm Lindefjell	Peugeot 306 S16	(Belgium) Michaël De Keersmaecker	Peugeot 106 XSi		
2002	1.	(Sweden) Kenneth Hansen	Citroën Xsara WRC	(Netherlands) Marc-Jan Vlassak	Opel Astra OPC	(Czech Republic) Aleš Zázvorka	Volkswagen Polo 1.4 16V		
2002	2.	(Sweden) Per Eklund	Saab 9-3 T16 4x4	(Sweden) Magnus Hansen	Citroën Xsara VTS	(Poland) Krzysztof Groblewski	Volkswagen Polo 1.4 16V		
2002	3.	(Czech Republic) Pavel Koutný	Ford Focus WRC; Ford Escort WRC	(Belgium) Ronny Scheveneels	Volkswagen Golf GTI 16V	(Czech Republic) Milan Peruth	Volkswagen Polo 1.4 16V		
Year		Division 1		Division 1A		Division 2			
2003	1.	(Sweden) Kenneth Hansen	Citroën Xsara T16 4x4	(Czech Republic) Jaroslav Kalný	Peugeot 206 XS	(Norway) Guttorm Lindefjell	Opel Astra OPC		
2003	2.	(Sweden) Per Eklund	Saab 9-3 T16 4x4	(Poland) Krzysztof Groblewski	Volkswagen Polo GTI	(Norway) Harald Sachweh	Opel Astra OPC		
2003	3.	(France) Jean-Luc Pailler	Peugeot 206 T16 4x4	(Netherlands) Ron Snoeck	SEAT Ibiza 16V	(Finland) Jussi Pinomäki	Renault Clio RS		
2004	1.	(Sweden) Kenneth Hansen	Citroën Xsara T16 4x4	(Netherlands) Ron Snoeck	SEAT Ibiza 16V	(Finland) Jussi Pinomäki	Renault Clio RS Ragnotti		
2004	2.	(Sweden) Michael Jernberg	Ford Focus T16 4x4	(Poland) Krzysztof Groblewski	Volkswagen Polo GTI	(Norway) Harald Sachweh	Opel Astra OPC		
2004	3.	(Netherlands) Jos Kuypers	Ford Focus T16 4x4	(Poland) Marcin Laskowski	Peugeot 106 S16	(Sweden) Per Gustafsson	Peugeot 206 RC		
2005	1.	(Sweden) Kenneth Hansen	Citroën Xsara T16 4x4	(Netherlands) Ron Snoeck	SEAT Ibiza 16V	(Finland) Jussi Pinomäki	Renault Clio RS Ragnotti		
2005	2.	(Sweden) Michael Jernberg	Ford Focus T16 4x4	(Czech Republic) Jaroslav Kalný	Peugeot 206 XSi	(Belgium) Michaël De Keersmaecker	Honda Civic Type R		
2005	3.	(Norway) Sverre Isachsen	Ford Focus T16 4x4	(Denmark) Morten Jespersen	Peugeot 106 S16	(Sweden) Marcus Nilsson	Peugeot 206 RC		
2006	1.	(Sweden) Lars Larsson	Škoda Fabia T16 4x4	(Poland) Krzysztof Groblewski	Volkswagen Polo GTI	(Czech Republic) Roman Častoral	Opel Astra OPC		
2006	2.	(Sweden) Kenneth Hansen	Citroën C4 T16 4x4	(Denmark) Morten Jespersen	Peugeot 106 S16	(Sweden) Mattias Thörjesson	Opel Astra OPC		
2006	3.	(Norway) Tommy Rustad	Ford Focus T16 4x4	(Finland) Jussi Pinomäki	Renault Clio 1.6	(Czech Republic) Tomáš Kotek	Honda Civic Type R		
2007	1.	(Sweden) Lars Larsson	Škoda Fabia T16 4x4	(Belgium) Michaël De Keersmaecker	Opel Corsa GSi	(Czech Republic) Tomáš Kotek	Honda Civic Type R		
2007	2.	(Sweden) Kenneth Hansen	Citroën C4 T16 4x4	(Czech Republic) Jaroslav Kalný	Peugeot 206 XS	(Czech Republic) Roman Častoral	Opel Astra OPC		
2007	3.	(Sweden) Andréas Eriksson	Ford Fiesta ST T16 4x4	(France) Olivier Bossard	Citroën Saxo VTS; Citroën C2 GT	(Lithuania) Martynas Padgurskis	Renault Clio RS		
2008	1.	(Sweden) Kenneth Hansen	Citroën C4 T16 4x4	(Finland) Jussi Pinomäki	Renault Clio	(Czech Republic) Tomáš Kotek	Honda Civic Type R		
2008	2.	(Norway) Ludvig Hunsbedt	Volvo S40 T16 4x4	(France) Olivier Bossard	Citroën C2	(Czech Republic) Roman Častoral	Opel Astra OPC		
2008	3.	(Sweden) Michael Jernberg	Škoda Fabia Mk2 T16 4x4	(Czech Republic) Zdeněk Čermák	Škoda Fabia Mk1	(Czech Republic) Ondřej Smetana	Honda Civic Type R		
2009	1.	(Norway) Sverre Isachsen	Ford Focus ST T16 4x4	(Norway) Mats Lysen	Renault Clio Mk2	(Norway) Knut Ove Børseth	Ford Fiesta ST RWD		
2009	2.	(Sweden) Michael Jernberg	Škoda Fabia Mk2 T16 4x4	(Russia) Eduard Leganov	Volkswagen Polo Mk4	(Belgium) Jos Sterkens	Ford Focus ST RWD		
2009	3.	(Sweden) Kenneth Hansen	Citroën C4 T16 4x4	(Russia) Timur Timerzyanov	Renault Clio Mk2	(Belgium) Guino Kenis	BMW 120		
2010	1.	(Norway) Sverre Isachsen	Ford Focus ST T16 4x4	(Russia) Timur Timerzyanov	Renault Clio Mk2	(Republic of Ireland) Derek Tohill	Ford Fiesta Mk7 RWD		
2010	2.	(Sweden) Kenneth Hansen	Citroën C4 T16 4x4	(Russia) Ildar Rakhmatullin	Renault Clio Mk2	(Norway) Knut Ove Børseth	Ford Fiesta Mk7 RWD		
2010	3.	(United Kingdom) Liam Doran	Citroën C4 T16	(Norway) Andreas Bakkerud	Peugeot 206/Renault Clio	(Norway) Ole Kristian Nøttveit	Citroën Xsara RWD/Mazda RX-8		
Year		Supercar		Super1600		TouringCar			
2011	1.	(Norway) Sverre Isachsen	Ford Focus T16	(Norway) Andreas Bakkerud	Renault Clio	(Norway) Lars Øivind Enerberg	Ford Fiesta ST RWD		
2011	2.	(United States) Tanner Foust	Ford Fiesta T16	(Denmark) Ulrik Linnemann	Peugeot 207	(Czech Republic) Roman Častoral	Opel Astra OPC RWD		
2011	3.	(Russia) Timur Timerzyanov	Citroën C4 T16	(Poland) Krzysztof Skorupski	Volkswagen Polo	(Republic of Ireland) Derek Tohill	Ford Fiesta RWD		
2012	1.	(Russia) Timur Timerzyanov	Citroën DS3 T16	(Norway) Andreas Bakkerud	Renault Twingo	(Sweden) Anton Marklund	Ford Fiesta RWD		
2012	2.	(United Kingdom) Liam Doran	Citroën DS3 T16	(Poland) Krzysztof Skorupski	Volkswagen Polo	(Republic of Ireland) Derek Tohill	Ford Fiesta RWD		
2012	3.	(United States) Tanner Foust	Ford Fiesta T16	(Finland) Jussi-Petteri Leppihalme	Renault Clio	(Czech Republic) Roman Častoral	Opel Astra OPC RWD		
2013	1.	(Russia) Timur Timerzyanov	Citroën DS3 T16	(Latvia) Reinis Nitišs	Renault Clio	(Republic of Ireland) Derek Tohill	Ford Fiesta RWD		
2013	2.	(France) Davy Jeanney	Citroën C4 T16	(Russia) Ildar Rakhmatullin	Renault Twingo	(Sweden) Robin Larsson	Škoda Fabia RWD		
2013	3.	(Sweden) Timmy Hansen	Citroën DS3 T16	(Denmark) Ulrik Linnemann	Peugeot 207	(Czech Republic) Roman Častoral	Opel Astra G RWD		
2014
2014	1.	(Sweden) Robin Larsson	Audi A1	(Russia) Sergey Zagumennov	Škoda Fabia	(Sweden) Daniel Lundh	Volvo C30 RWD		
2014	2.	(Norway) Henning Solberg	Saab 9-3/Citroën DS3	(Russia) Nikita Misiulia	Škoda Fabia	(Norway) Torleif Lona	Ford Fiesta RWD		
2014	3.	(Sweden) Pontus Tidemand	Audi S1	(Latvia) Jānis Baumanis	Renault Twingo	(Norway) Anders Bråten	Ford Fiesta RWD		
2015
2015	1.	(Norway) Tommy Rustad	Volkswagen Polo	(Latvia) Jānis Baumanis	Renault Twingo	(Sweden) Fredrik Salsten	Citroën DS3 RWD		
2015	2.	(France) Jérôme Grosset-Janin	Peugeot 208	(Denmark) Ulrik Linnemann	Peugeot 208	(Norway) Fredrik Magnussen	Ford Fiesta RWD		
2015	3.	(Norway) Ole Christian Veiby	Volkswagen Polo	(Hungary) Krisztián Szabó	Škoda Fabia	(Norway) David Nordgård	Ford Fiesta RWD		
2016
2016	1.	(Sweden) Kevin Hansen	Peugeot 208	(Hungary) Krisztián Szabó	Škoda Fabia	(Norway) Ben-Philip Gundersen	Ford Fiesta RWD		
2016	2.	(France) Jérôme Grosset-Janin	Peugeot 208	(Denmark) Ulrik Linnemann	Peugeot 208	(Sweden) Magda Andersson	Ford Fiesta RWD		
2016	3.	(Norway) Tord Linnerud	Volkswagen Polo	(Lithuania) Kasparas Navickas	Škoda Fabia	(Norway) Fredrik Magnussen	Ford Fiesta RWD		
2017
2017	1.	(Sweden) Anton Marklund	Volkswagen Polo	(Hungary) Krisztián Szabó	Škoda Fabia	(Norway) Lars Øivind Enerberg	Ford Fiesta RWD		
2017	2.	(Norway) Thomas Bryntesson	Ford Fiesta	(Latvia) Artis Baumanis	Škoda Fabia	(Norway) Anders Nymoen Bråten	Ford Fiesta RWD		
2017	3.	(Hungary) Tamás Pál Kiss	Peugeot 208	(Finland) Jussi-Petteri Leppihalme	Renault Twingo	(Sweden) Philip Gehrman	Ford Fiesta RWD		
2018
2018	1.	(Latvia) Reinis Nitišs	Ford Fiesta	(Lithuania) Rokas Baciuška	Audi A1	(Belgium) Steve Volders	Ford Fiesta RWD		
2018	2.	(Sweden) Anton Marklund	Volkswagen Polo	(Russia) Aydar Nuriev	Škoda Fabia	(Norway) Fredrik Magnussen	Ford Fiesta RWD		
2018	3.	(France) Cyril Raymond	Peugeot 208	(Latvia) Artis Baumanis	Audi A1	(Norway) Daniel Holten	Ford Fiesta RWD		
2019
2019	1.	(Sweden) Robin Larsson	Audi S1	(Russia) Aydar Nuriev	Audi A1				
2019	2.	(France) Jean-Baptiste Dubourg	Peugeot 208	(Hungary) Gergely Márton	Audi A1				
2019	3.	(Norway) Thomas Bryntesson	Volkswagen Polo	(Russia) Artur Egorov	Audi A1				
2020	Not awarded (Finale was cancelled due to the COVID-19 pandemic in Europe)								
Year		RX1		RX3					
2021	1.	(Norway) Andreas Bakkerud	Škoda Fabia	(Switzerland) Yury Belevskiy	Audi A1				
2021	2.	(France) Fabien Pailler	Peugeot 208	(Belgium) Kobe Pauwels	Audi A1				
2021	3.	(Latvia) Janis Baumanis	Škoda Fabia	(Russia) Marat Knyazev	Audi A1				
2022	1.	(Sweden) Anton Marklund	Hyundai i20	(Belgium) Kobe Pauwels	Audi A1				
2022	2.	(Latvia) Janis Baumanis	Peugeot 208	(Poland) Damian Litwinowicz	Audi A1				
2022	3.	(Belgium) Enzo Ide	Audi S1	(Czech Republic) Jan Černý	Škoda Citigo				
Year		RX1		RX3		RX2e			
2023	1.	(Sweden) Anton Marklund	Ford Fiesta	(Poland) Damian Litwinowicz	Audi A1	(Sweden) Nils Andersson	ZEROID X1		
2023	2.	(Latvia) Janis Baumanis	Peugeot 208	(Norway) Espen Isaksaetre	Audi A1	(Sweden) Isak Sjökvist	ZEROID X1		
2023	3.	(United Kingdom) Patrick O'Donovan	Peugeot 208	(Germany) Nils Volland	Audi A1	(Sweden) Mikaela Åhlin-Kottulinsky	ZEROID X1		
2024	1.	(United Kingdom) Patrick O'Donovan	Peugeot 208	(Germany) Nils Volland	Audi A1	(Sweden) Nils Andersson	ZEROID X1		
2024	2.	(Switzerland) Yury Belevskiy	Audi S1	(Portugal) João Ribeiro	Audi A1	(Sweden) Isak Sjökvist	ZEROID X1		
2024	3.	(Hungary) Máté Benyó	Peugeot 208	(Austria) Dominik Senegacnik	Škoda Fabia	(Estonia) Marko Muru	ZEROID X1		
Year		RX1		RX3					
2025	1.	(Switzerland) Yury Belevskiy	Audi S1	(Portugal) João Ribeiro	Audi A1				
2025	2.	(Poland) Damian Litwinowicz	Audi S1	(Lithuania) Rytis Gurklys	Audi A1				
2025	3.	(Finland) Mika Liimatainen	Hyundai i20	(Antigua and Barbuda) Nicolas Geleyns	Audi A1				
Year		RX1		RX3		RX4		RX5	
2026	1.	(Sweden) Johan Kristoffersson	Volkswagen Polo	(Lithuania) Rytis Gurklys	Audi A1	(France) Andrea Benezet	Renault Clio	(Estonia) Armin Raag	P-tech ESTfighter 2
2026	2.	(Finland) Juha Rytkönen	Hyundai i20	(France) Julien Meunier	Audi A1	(Poland) Filip Melon	Peugeot 208	(Estonia) Martin Juga	LifeLive TN11
2026	3.	(Norway) Andreas Bakkerud	Ford Fiesta	(Czech Republic) Libor Teješ	Audi A1	(China) Haotian Deng	Renault Clio	(Spain) Diego Martínez	Speedcar Wonder-R

== See also ==
- FIA World Rallycross Championship
- List of rallycross drivers
