= Embassy/ERA European Rallycross Championship =

The Embassy/ERA European Rallycross Championship was the forerunner of the FIA European Rallycross Championship. It was organised in 1973 and 1974 by automobile clubs from Austria, Germany, Belgium, The Netherlands, Sweden and Finland (joined in 1974) under the supervision of the Thames Estuary Automobile Club (TEAC) of Great Britain on behalf of the manufacturer of Embassy cigarettes, tobacco company W. D. & H. O. Wills. At the end of 1974 the organisers founded the European Rallycross Association (ERA), before the motor sport of Rallycross was officially recognised by the FIA in 1976.

== 1973 Embassy ERC ==
=== Overall ===
- 1st - John Taylor (GB) - Ford Escort RS 1600 BDA
- 2nd - Rod Chapman (GB) - Ford Escort RS 1600 BDA
- 3rd - Franz Wurz (A) - VW 1302S 2.2

== 1974 Embassy ERC ==
=== Overall ===
- 1st - Franz Wurz (A) - VW 1302S 2.4 (VW 411 engine)
- 2nd - Björn Waldegård (S) - Porsche Carrera RSR
- 3rd - Stig Blomqvist (S) - Saab 96 V4

== 1975 ERA ERC ==
=== Overall ===
- 1st - Kees Teurlings (NL) - VW 1303S 3.0 (Porsche Carrera engine)
- 2nd - Dick Riefel (NL) - VW 1303S 3.0 (Porsche Carrera engine)
- 3rd - John Taylor (GB) - Ford Escort RS1600 / RS1800
