= Estering =

Race track in Buxtehude, Germany

- Location: Buxtehude, Lower Saxony, Germany
- Coordinates: 53°26′56″N 9°41′31″E
- Capacity: 15,000
- FIA Grade: 6R (Rallycross)
- Opened: 21 May 1972; 53 years ago
- Major events: Former: FIA World Rallycross Championship; World RX of Germany (2014–2018); FIA European Rallycross Championship; Euro RX of Germany (1973–1982, 1984–2006, 2008–2010, 2012–2019, 2023); Titans-RX Europe (2019)
- Website: https://www.estering.de/
- Length: 0.952 km (0.590 miles)
- Turns: 8

Estering is a rallycross race track situated in Buxtehude, Lower Saxony Germany. It primarily ran the German round of the FIA European Rallycross Championship until 2019. It also ran the World RX of Germany event of the FIA World Rallycross Championship from 2014 to 2018 before being dropped in 2019.
