= Temte =

Temte is a Norwegian surname. Notable people with the surname include:

- Ole Kristian Temte (born 1975), Norwegian race car driver
- Rune Temte (born 1965), Norwegian actor
