= 2017 FIA European Rallycross Championship =

FIA European Rallycross Championship season

The 2017 FIA European Rallycross Championship was the 42nd season of the FIA European Championships for Rallycross Drivers. The season consisted of nine rounds across three categories; Supercar, Super1600 and TouringCar. The season commencing on 1 April with the Spanish round at the Circuit de Barcelona-Catalunya, and culminating on 1 October in Germany at the Estering.

Swede Kevin Hansen was the defending Supercar champion, Hungarian Krisztián Szabó was defending Super1600 champion and Norwegian Ben-Philip Gundersen was defending TouringCar champion.

2017 champions were Anton Marklund (Supercar), Krisztián Szabó (Super1600) and Lars Øivind Enerberg (TouringCar).

== Calendar ==
| Round | Event | Venue | Dates | Category | Final Winner | Car | Team |
|---|---|---|---|---|---|---|---|
| 1 | (Spain) Euro RX of Barcelona | Circuit de Barcelona-Catalunya | 1–2 April | Supercar | (Sweden) Anton Marklund | Volkswagen Polo | (Sweden) Marklund Motorsport |
| 1 | (Spain) Euro RX of Barcelona | Circuit de Barcelona-Catalunya | 1–2 April | TouringCar | (Sweden) Philip Gehrman | Ford Fiesta | (Sweden) Bridgestone Motorsport |
| 2 | Euro RX of Portugal | Pista Automóvel de Montalegre | 22–23 April | Super1600 | (Denmark) Ulrik Linnemann | Peugeot 208 | (Denmark) Linnemann Motorsport |
| 3 | Euro RX of Belgium | Circuit Jules Tacheny Mettet | 13–14 May | Super1600 | (Lithuania) Kasparas Navickas | Škoda Fabia | (Lithuania) Taurages Automobiliu Klubas VŠĮ |
| 3 | Euro RX of Belgium | Circuit Jules Tacheny Mettet | 13–14 May | TouringCar | (Norway) Lars Øivind Enerberg | Ford Fiesta | (Norway) Lars Øivind Enerberg |
| 4 | (United Kingdom) Euro RX of Great Britain | Lydden Hill Race Circuit | 27–28 May | TouringCar | (Norway) Lars Øivind Enerberg | Ford Fiesta | (Norway) Lars Øivind Enerberg |
| 5 | Euro RX of Norway | Lånkebanen | 10–11 June | Supercar | (Sweden) Robin Larsson | Audi A1 | (Sweden) Robin Larsson |
| 5 | Euro RX of Norway | Lånkebanen | 10–11 June | TouringCar | (Norway) Lars Øivind Enerberg | Ford Fiesta | (Norway) Lars Øivind Enerberg |
| 6 | Euro RX of Sweden | Höljesbanan | 1–2 July | Supercar | (Sweden) Anton Marklund | Volkswagen Polo | (Sweden) Marklund Motorsport |
| 6 | Euro RX of Sweden | Höljesbanan | 1–2 July | Super1600 | (Latvia) Artis Baumanis | Škoda Fabia | (Hungary) Volland Racing |
| 7 | Euro RX of France | Circuit de Lohéac | 2–3 September | Supercar | (Norway) Thomas Bryntesson | Ford Fiesta | (Sweden) JC Raceteknik |
| 7 | Euro RX of France | Circuit de Lohéac | 2–3 September | Super1600 | (Hungary) Krisztián Szabó | Škoda Fabia | (Hungary) Volland Racing |
| 8 | Euro RX of Latvia | Biķernieku Kompleksā Sporta Bāze | 16–17 September | Supercar | (Sweden) Anton Marklund | Volkswagen Polo | (Sweden) Marklund Motorsport |
| 8 | Euro RX of Latvia | Biķernieku Kompleksā Sporta Bāze | 16–17 September | Super1600 | (Hungary) Krisztián Szabó | Škoda Fabia | (Hungary) Volland Racing |
| 9 | Euro RX of Germany | Estering | 30 September–1 October | Super1600 | (Lithuania) Kasparas Navickas | Škoda Fabia | (Lithuania) Taurages Automobiliu Klubas VŠĮ |
| 9 | Euro RX of Germany | Estering | 30 September–1 October | TouringCar | (Norway) Ben-Philip Gundersen | Ford Fiesta | (Norway) Ben-Philip Gundersen |

== Entry list ==
=== Supercar ===
| Constructor | Entrant | Car | No. | Driver | Rounds |
|---|---|---|---|---|---|
| Audi | (Sweden) Robin Larsson | Audi A1 | 4 | (Sweden) Robin Larsson | All |
| Audi | (Hungary) Kárai Motorsport Sportegyesület | Audi A1 | 102 | (Hungary) Tamás Kárai | All |
| Audi | (Germany) All-Inkl.com Münnich Motorsport | Audi S3 | 38 | (Germany) Mandie August | 1–3 |
Citroën
| Citroën | (Norway) Ole Kristian Temte | Citroën C4 | 30 | (Norway) Ole Kristian Temte | All |
| Citroën | (France) Firmin Cadeddu | Citroën C4 | 62 | (France) Firmin Cadeddu | 1–2, 4 |
| Citroën | (France) DA Racing | Citroën DS3 | 22 | (France) Andréa Dubourg | All |
| Citroën | (Norway) Tore Kristoffersen | Citroën DS3 | 32 | (Norway) Tore Kristoffersen | All |
| Citroën | (France) Hervé "Knapick" Lemonnier | Citroën DS3 | 74 | (France) Jérôme Grosset-Janin | All |
| Citroën | (Germany) All-Inkl.com Münnich Motorsport | Citroën DS3 | 77 | (Germany) René Münnich | 2–3 |
| Ford | (Republic of Ireland) Oliver O'Donovan | Ford Fiesta | 2 | (Republic of Ireland) Oliver O'Donovan | All |
| Ford | (Estonia) Tikkri Motorsport | Ford Fiesta | 23 | (Estonia) Mart Tikkerbär | 2, 5 |
| Ford | (Finland) Ari-Pekka Niemi | Ford Fiesta | 37 | (Finland) Ari-Pekka Niemi | 3 |
| Ford | (Belgium) "M.D.K" | Ford Fiesta | 49 | (Belgium) "M.D.K" | All |
| Ford | (Sweden) Mats Öhman | Ford Fiesta | 54 | (Sweden) Mats Öhman | 2–4 |
| Ford | (Lithuania) Baltijos Sportas Klaipedos m. TSK | Ford Fiesta | 55 | (Lithuania) Paulius Pleskovas | 2–5 |
| Ford | (Norway) Stein Egil Jenssen | Ford Fiesta | 61 | (Norway) Stein Egil Jenssen | 3 |
| Ford | (Sweden) Hedströms Motorsport | Ford Fiesta | 63 | (Norway) Joachim Hvaal | All |
| Ford | (Poland) Martin Kaczmarski | Ford Fiesta | 69 | (Poland) Martin Kaczmarski | 1–2, 5 |
| Ford | (Germany) Andreas Steffen | Ford Fiesta | 80 | (Germany) Andreas Steffen | 1-4 |
| Ford | (Sweden) JC Raceteknik | Ford Fiesta | 90 | (Norway) Thomas Bryntesson | All |
| Ford | (Sweden) JC Raceteknik | Ford Fiesta | 91 | (Norway) Ola Frøshaug | All |
| Ford | (Estonia) Valdur Reinsalu|Reinsalu Sport | Ford Fiesta | 95 | (Estonia) Andri Õun | All |
| Ford | (Republic of Ireland) Derek Tohill | Ford Fiesta | 111 | (Republic of Ireland) Derek Tohill | All |
| Ford | (Norway) Knut-Ove Børseth | Ford Focus | 70 | (Norway) Knut-Ove Børseth | 2 |
| Mini | (Finland) #MiniSuomi | Mini Countryman | 12 | (Finland) Riku Tahko | All |
| Mitsubishi | (United Kingdom) James Grint | Mitsubishi Mirage | 27 | (United Kingdom) James Grint | 4 |
| Peugeot | (France) Pailler Compétition | Peugeot 208 | 18 | (France) Jonathan Pailler | 4 |
| Peugeot | (France) Pailler Compétition | Peugeot 208 | 20 | (France) Fabien Pailler | 4 |
| Peugeot | (United Kingdom) Albatec Racing | Peugeot 208 | 14 | (Finland) Jere Kalliokoski | All |
| Peugeot | (United Kingdom) Albatec Racing | Peugeot 208 | 24 | (Norway) Tommy Rustad | All |
| Peugeot | (United Kingdom) Albatec Racing | Peugeot 208 | 121 | (France) Philippe Maloigne | 1 |
| Peugeot | (Lebanon) Nabil Karam | Peugeot 208 | 35 | (Lebanon) Nabil Karam | 4 |
| Peugeot | (Hungary) Speedbox Racing Team | Peugeot 208 | 47 | (Hungary) Tamás Pál Kiss | All |
| Peugeot | (France) Rodolphe Audran | Peugeot 208 | 56 | (France) Rodolphe Audran | 4 |
| Peugeot | (France) Patrick Guillerme | Peugeot 208 | 83 | (France) Patrick Guillerme | 1, 4 |
| Renault | (France) David Olivier | Renault Logan | 85 | (France) David Olivier | 4 |
| SEAT | (Germany) All-Inkl.com Münnich Motorsport | Seat Ibiza | 38 | (Germany) Mandie August | 4–5 |
| SEAT | (Germany) All-Inkl.com Münnich Motorsport | Seat Ibiza | 77 | (Germany) René Münnich | 1, 4–5 |
| Volkswagen | (Sweden) Marklund Motorsport | Volkswagen Polo | 19 | (Sweden) Magda Andersson | All |
| Volkswagen | (Sweden) Marklund Motorsport | Volkswagen Polo | 92 | (Sweden) Anton Marklund | All |
| Volkswagen | (Sweden) Hedströms Motorsport | Volkswagen Polo | 8 | (Sweden) Peter Hedström | All |
| Volkswagen | (Sweden) Hedströms Motorsport | Volkswagen Polo | 53 | (Norway) Alexander Hvaal | All |
| Volkswagen | (Belgium) Oud-Turnhout Rally Team | Volkswagen Polo | 28 | (Belgium) Jochen Coox | 3 |
| Volkswagen | (Sweden) Eklund Motorsport | Volkswagen Beetle | 39 | (Sweden) Philip Gehrman | 3, 5 |
| Volkswagen | (Sweden) Eklund Motorsport | Volkswagen Beetle | 73 | (Norway) Henning Solberg | 1–3 |
| Volvo | (Norway) Tom Daniel Tånevik | Volvo C30 | 16 | (Norway) Tom Daniel Tånevik | All |

=== Super1600 ===
| Constructor | Entrant | Car | No. | Driver | Rounds |
|---|---|---|---|---|---|
| Alfa Romeo | (Italy) Tedak Racing | Alfa Romeo MiTo | 43 | (Italy) Davide Medici | 4 |
| Alfa Romeo | (Italy) Tedak Racing | Alfa Romeo MiTo | 45 | (Italy) Max Vercelli | 2 |
| Alfa Romeo | (Italy) Luciano Visintin | Alfa Romeo MiTo | 69 | (Italy) Luciano Visintin | 4 |
| Citroën | (Portugal) Hélder Ribeiro | Citroën C2 | 22 | (Portugal) Hélder Ribeiro | 1 |
| Citroën | (France) Damien Meunier | Citroën C2 | 25 | (France) Damien Meunier | 4 |
| Citroën | (Portugal) Nuno Araújo | Citroën C2 | 26 | (Portugal) Nuno Araújo | 1 |
| Citroën | (France) Jimmy Terpereau | Citroën C2 | 37 | (France) Jimmy Terpereau | 1–5 |
| Citroën | (Norway) Marius Bermingrud | Citroën C2 | 51 | (Norway) Marius Bermingrud | 6 |
| Citroën | (France) Maximilien Eveno | Citroën C2 | 75 | (France) Maximilien Eveno | 4 |
| Citroën | (Norway) Ada Marie Hvaal | Citroën C2 | 97 | (Norway) Ada Marie Hvaal | 2–3 |
| Citroën | (Belgium) Oud-Turnhout Rally Team | Citroën DS3 | 13 | (Belgium) Davy van den Branden | 2 |
| Citroën | (Portugal) Antonio Sousa | Citroën DS3 | 28 | (Portugal) Antonio Sousa | 1 |
| Ford | (Czech Republic) LS Racing Czech National Team | Ford Fiesta | 5 | (Czech Republic) Ondřej Smetana | All |
| Ford | (Germany) Schomaker-Racing | Ford Fiesta | 72 | (Germany) Sven Seeliger | 2, 6 |
| Ford | (Portugal) Marió Barbosa | Ford Fiesta | 76 | (Portugal) Marió Barbosa | 1–2, 4 |
| Ford | (Portugal) Marió Texeira | Ford Fiesta | 77 | (Portugal) Marió Texeira | 1 |
| Ford | (Estonia) Reinsalu Sport | Ford Ka | 29 | (Estonia) Arvo Kask | 3, 5 |
| Opel | (Norway) Lars Christian Lote Rosland | Opel Corsa | 80 | (Norway) Lars-Christian Rosland | All |
| Peugeot | (Czech Republic) Jihocesky Autocklub V ACR | Peugeot 207 | 30 | (Czech Republic) Marcel Suchý | 3–6 |
| Peugeot | (Denmark) Linnemann Motorsport | Peugeot 208 | 2 | (Denmark) Ulrik Linnemann | All |
| Peugeot | (Denmark) Linnemann Motorsport | Peugeot 208 | 12 | (Denmark) Daniel Nielsen | 6 |
| Peugeot | (Norway) Espen Isaksætre | Peugeot 208 | 8 | (Norway) Espen Isaksætre | 3, 5 |
| Peugeot | (France) Emmanuel Martin | Peugeot 208 | 39 | (France) Emmanuel Martin | 4 |
| Peugeot | (France) Grégory Fosse | Peugeot 208 | 40 | (France) Grégory Fosse | 4 |
| Peugeot | (Czech Republic) Veverka Czech National Team | Peugeot 208 | 66 | (Czech Republic) Václav Veverka | All |
| Peugeot | (France) Rudolf Schafer | Peugeot 208 | 73 | (France) Rudolf Schafer | 1–2, 4 |
| Renault | (France) Anthony Jan | Renault Clio | 35 | (France) Anthony Jan | 4 |
| Renault | (Netherlands) Marcel Snoeijers | Renault Mégane | 50 | (Netherlands) Marcel Snoeijers | 5–6 |
| Renault | (Finland) Set Promotion | Renault Twingo | 11 | (Finland) Jussi-Petteri Leppihalme | All |
| Renault | (Finland) Set Promotion | Renault Twingo | 46 | (Latvia) Mārtiņš Lapiņš | 5 |
| Renault | (Finland) Set Promotion | Renault Twingo | 89 | (Russia) Timur Shigaboutdinov | All |
| Renault | (Estonia) RS Racing Team | Renault Twingo | 20 | (Estonia) Siim Saluri | All |
| Renault | (Latvia) TT Motorsport | Renault Twingo | 33 | (Latvia) Arnis Odiņš | 3, 5–6 |
| Renault | (Latvia) TT Motorsport | Renault Twingo | 34 | (Latvia) Juris Spikis | 2–3, 5–6 |
| Renault | (France) Enzo Libner | Renault Twingo | 36 | (France) Enzo Libner | 4 |
| Škoda | (Czech Republic) Diana Czech National Team | Škoda Fabia | 3 | (Czech Republic) Pavel Vimmer | All |
| Škoda | (Lithuania) Taurages Automobiliu Klubas VŠĮ | Škoda Fabia | 6 | (Lithuania) Kasparas Navickas | All |
| Škoda | (Czech Republic) Zdeněk Kučera | Škoda Fabia | 9 | (Czech Republic) Zdeněk Kučera | All |
| Škoda | (Estonia) Ligur Racing | Škoda Fabia | 10 | (Estonia) Janno Ligur | All |
| Škoda | (Hungary) Volland Racing | Škoda Fabia | 14 | (Lithuania) Rokas Baciuska | 4–5 |
| Škoda | (Hungary) Volland Racing | Škoda Fabia | 15 | (Hungary) Gergely Marton | All |
| Škoda | (Hungary) Volland Racing | Škoda Fabia | 17 | (Latvia) Artis Baumanis | All |
| Škoda | (Hungary) Volland Racing | Škoda Fabia | 23 | (Hungary) Krisztián Szabó | All |
| Škoda | (Czech Republic) Josef Šusta | Škoda Fabia | 16 | (Czech Republic) Josef Šusta | All |
| Škoda | (Hungary) Speedy Motorsport | Škoda Fabia | 18 | (Hungary) Zsolt Szíjj | 1–3 |
| Škoda | (France) Patrice Durand | Škoda Fabia | 27 | (France) Patrice Durand | 4 |
| Škoda | (Estonia) Reinsalu Sport | Škoda Fabia | 47 | (Estonia) Andre Krug | 4–5 |
| Škoda | (Hungary) Nyirád Motorsport | Škoda Fabia | 48 | (Hungary) Attila Mózer | 5 |
| Suzuki | (France) Julien Hardonnière | Suzuki Swift | 41 | (France) Julien Hardonnière | 4 |
| Suzuki | TQS Hungary | Suzuki Swift | 52 | (Hungary) Marcell Kovács | 6 |
| Volkswagen | (Norway) Anders Bjørland Hansen | Volkswagen Polo | 4 | (Norway) Anders Bjørland Hansen | 1–5 |
| Volkswagen | (Latvia) Edijs Ošs | Volkswagen Polo | 49 | (Latvia) Edijs Ošs | 5 |
| Volkswagen | (Belgium) Nationale Renstal Trommelke Vzw | Volkswagen Polo | 94 | (Belgium) Nick Vanalken | 2 |

=== TouringCar ===
| Constructor | Entrant | Car | No. | Driver | Round |
|---|---|---|---|---|---|
| BMW | (Germany) Ralf Evers | BMW E87 | 28 | (Germany) Ralf Evers | 5 |
| Citroën | (Norway) Camilla Antonsen | Citroën DS3 | 15 | (Norway) Camilla Antonsen | 4 |
| Citroën | (Sweden) Fredrik Salsten | Citroën DS3 | 17 | (Sweden) Fredrik Salsten | 5 |
| Ford | (Norway) Ben-Philip Gundersen | Ford Fiesta | 1 | (Norway) Ben-Philip Gundersen | All |
| Ford | (Norway) David Nordgård | Ford Fiesta | 2 | (Norway) David Nordgård | All |
| Ford | (Norway) Anders Nymoen Bråten | Ford Fiesta | 3 | (Norway) Anders Nymoen Bråten | All |
| Ford | (Norway) Fredrik R. Magnussen | Ford Fiesta | 12 | (Norway) Fredrik R. Magnussen | 4 |
| Ford | (Belgium) Trommelke | Ford Fiesta | 77 | (Belgium) Steve Volders | All |
| Ford | (Netherlands) Mandy Kasse | Ford Fiesta | 88 | (Netherlands) Mandy Kasse | 2–3 |
| Ford | (Norway) Lars Øivind Enerberg | Ford Fiesta | 90 | (Norway) Lars Øivind Enerberg | All |
| Ford | (Sweden) Bridgestone Motorsport | Ford Fiesta | 95 | (Sweden) Philip Gehrman | All |
| Ford | (Norway) Kai Arne Homme | Ford Focus | 78 | (Norway) Kai Arne Homme | 1–2, 4 |
| Mazda | (Norway) Per Magne Røyrås | Mazda RX-8 | 5 | (Norway) Per Magne Røyrås | All |
| Mazda | (Norway) Sivert Svardal | Mazda RX-8 | 9 | (Norway) Sivert Svardal | 4 |
| Mazda | (Norway) Steinar Stokke | Mazda RX-8 | 11 | (Norway) Steinar Stokke | All |
| Opel | (Norway) Petter Brauten | Opel Corsa | 86 | (Norway) Petter Brauten | 1–2, 4 |
| Škoda | (Sweden) Bridgestone Motorsport | Škoda Fabia | 4 | (Norway) Kjetil Larsen | All |
| Škoda | (Belgium) Ecurie N.E.W. Racing | Škoda Fabia | 22 | (Belgium) Florent Hontoir | 2 |
| Toyota | (Sweden) Sören Hedlund | Toyota Auris | 83 | (Sweden) Sören Hedlund | 5 |
| Volvo | (Belgium) OTRT | Volvo C30 | 14 | (Belgium) Danny de Beuckelaer | 2 |

== Championship Standings ==
(key)

=== Supercar ===
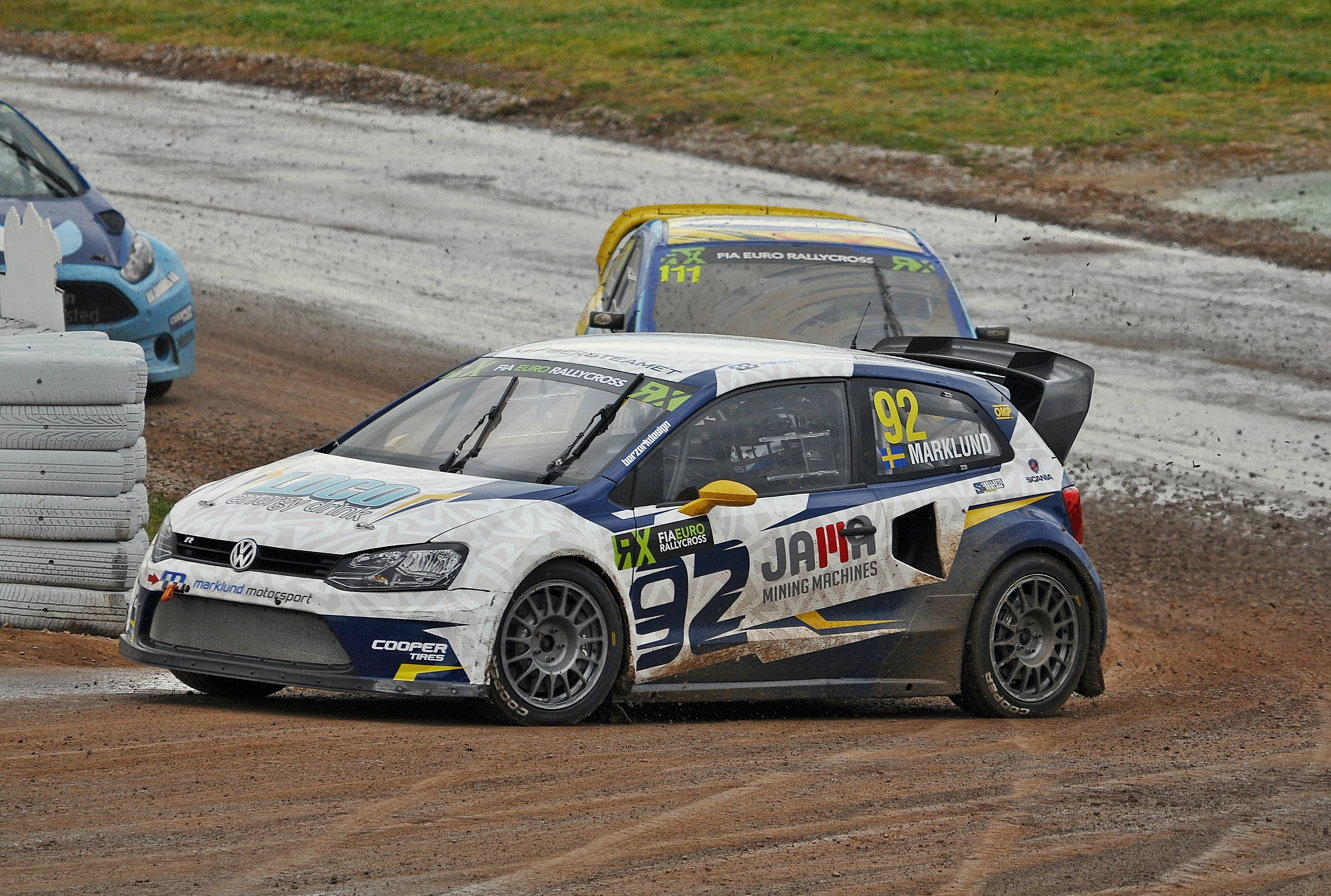
Anton Marklund was the champion in the Supercar class

| Pos. | Driver | BAR (Spain) | NOR (Norway) | SWE (Sweden) | FRA (France) | LAT (Latvia) | Points |
|---|---|---|---|---|---|---|---|
| 1 | (Sweden) Anton Marklund | 1 | 2 | 1 | 4^{b} | 1 | 129 |
| 2 | (Norway) Thomas Bryntesson | 7 | 7 | 7 | 1 | 6 | 101 |
| 3 | (Hungary) Tamás Pál Kiss | 2 | 5 | 32 | 2 | 3 | 90 |
| 4 | (Sweden) Robin Larsson | 8 | 1 | 8 | 14 | 2 | 88 |
| 5 | (Norway) Tommy Rustad | 9 | 6 | 9 | 6 | 4 | 86 |
| 6 | (Norway) Alexander Hvaal | 10 | 3 | 5 | 8 | 10^{c} | 61 |
| 7 | (Republic of Ireland) Derek Tohill | 5 | 10 | 11 | 5 | 8 | 59 |
| 8 | (Sweden) Peter Hedström | 29 | 4 | 2 | 17 | 12 | 50 |
| 9 | (France) Jérôme Grosset-Janin | 11 | 8 | 18 | 10 | 7 | 45 |
| 10 | (Norway) Ola Frøshaug | 13 | 9 | 4 | 16 | 9 | 40 |
| 11 | (Germany) René Münnich | 4 | 19 | 3 | 13 | 17 | 38 |
| 12 | (Republic of Ireland) Oliver O'Donovan | 3 | 13 | 16 | 12 | 13 | 33 |
| 13 | (Finland) Jere Kalliokoski | 15 | 11 | 10 | 15 | 15 | 25 |
| 14 | (Norway) Henning Solberg | 6 | 12 | 14 | | | 23 |
| 15 | (France) Firmin Cadeddu | 17 | 18 | | 3 | | 21 |
| 16 | (Sweden) Magda Andersson | 28 | 15 | 12 | 9 | 19 | 19 |
| 17 | (Hungary) Tamás Kárai | 23 | 23 | 22 | 25 | 5 | 16 |
| 18 | (Sweden) Mats Ӧhman | | 24 | 6 | 26 | | 11 |
| 19 | (Sweden) Philip Gehrman | | | 19 | | 11 | 8 |
| 20 | (France) Patrick Guillerme | 24 | | | 11 | | 7 |
| 21 | (Poland) Martin Kaczmarski | 12 | 24 | | | 24 | 7 |
| 22 | (France) Andréa Dubourg | 16 | 16 | 13 | 21 | 25 | 6 |
| 23 | (Finland) Riku Tahko | 14 | 21 | 21 | 33 | 14 | 6 |
| 24 | (France) Jonathan Pailler | | | | 7^{a} | | 4 |
| 25 | (Norway) Knut-Ove Børseth | | 14 | | | | 3 |
| 26 | (Belgium) "M.D.K" | 18 | 28 | 15 | 23 | 27 | 2 |
| 27 | (Norway) Tom-Daniel Tånevik | 21 | 26 | 31 | 18 | 16 | 1 |
| 28 | (Norway) Joachim Hvaal | 20 | 20 | 17 | 19 | 23 | 0 |
| 29 | (Germany) Mandie August | 25 | 22 | 23 | 22 | 18 | 0 |
| 30 | (France) Philippe Maloigne | 19 | | | | | 0 |
| 31 | (Lithuania) Paulius Pleskovas | | 29 | 24 | 31 | 20 | 0 |
| 32 | (Norway) Stein-Egil Jenssen | | | 20 | | | 0 |
| 33 | (France) David Olivier | | | | 20 | | 0 |
| 34 | (Norway) Tore Kristoffersen | 26 | 30 | 25 | 29 | 21 | 0 |
| 35 | (Germany) Andreas Steffen | 22 | 25 | 28 | 24 | | 0 |
| 36 | (Estonia) Andri Õun | 27 | 27 | 26 | 30 | 22 | 0 |
| 37 | (Estonia) Mart Tikkerbär | | 32 | | | 26 | 0 |
| 38 | (Belgium) Jochen Coox | | | 27 | | | 0 |
| 39 | (Norway) Ole-Kristian Temte | 30 | 31 | 30 | 32 | 28 | 0 |
| 40 | (Finland) Ari-Pekka Niemi | | | 29 | | | 0 |
| 41 | (France) Rodolphe Audran | | | | 34 | | 0 |
| 42 | (United Kingdom) James Grint | | | | 35 | | 0 |
| 43 | (France) Fabien Pailler | | | | 27^{a} | | -10 |
| 44 | (Lebanon) Nabil Karam | | | | 28^{a} | | -10 |
| Pos. | Driver | BAR (Spain) | NOR (Norway) | SWE (Sweden) | FRA (France) | LAT (Latvia) | Points |

^{a} Loss of ten championship points for presenting a turbocharger for sealing after initial scrutineering.
^{b} Loss of five championship points for receiving his third reprimand of the season.
^{c} Loss of ten championship points – stewards decision No.10.

=== Super1600 ===
| Pos. | Driver | POR (Portugal) | BEL (Belgium) | SWE (Sweden) | FRA (France) | LAT (Latvia) | GER (Germany) | Points |
|---|---|---|---|---|---|---|---|---|
| 1 | (Hungary) Krisztián Szabó | 2 | 8 | 2 | 1 | 1 | 6 | 137 |
| 2 | (Latvia) Artis Baumanis | 3 | 5 | 1 | 5 | 8 | 3 | 127 |
| 3 | (Finland) Jussi-Petteri Leppihalme | 6 | 3 | 5 | 9 | 3 | 2 | 121 |
| 4 | (Lithuania) Kasparas Navickas | 4 | 1 | 8 | 24 | 7 | 1 | 110 |
| 5 | (Denmark) Ulrik Linnemann | 1 | 6 | 11 | 3 | 12 | 9 | 93 |
| 6 | (Estonia) Janno Ligur | 8 | 2 | 3 | 11 | 4 | 4 | 92 |
| 7 | (Russia) Timur Shigaboutdinov | 5 | 4 | 4 | 8 | 9 | 12 | 88 |
| 8 | (Czech Republic) Josef Šusta | 19 | 11 | 9 | 7 | 13 | 5 | 58 |
| 9 | (Hungary) Gergely Marton | 11 | 14 | 6 | 4 | 6 | 15 | 54 |
| 10 | (Czech Republic) Ondřej Smetana | 7 | 9 | 12 | 15 | 11 | 7 | 53 |
| 11 | (Lithuania) Rokas Baciuska | | | | 6 | 2 | | 44 |
| 12 | (Czech Republic) Václav Veverka | 12 | 12 | 14 | 31 | 15 | 8 | 30 |
| 13 | (France) Jimmy Terpereau | 13 | 7 | 10 | 18 | 18 | | 29 |
| 14 | (France) Maximilien Eveno | | | | 2 | | | 26 |
| 15 | (Latvia) Juris Spikis | | 10 | 19 | | 5 | 13 | 25 |
| 16 | (Czech Republic) Pavel Vimmer | 9 | 20 | 17 | 12 | 20 | 11 | 25 |
| 17 | (Estonia) Siim Saluri | 10 | 13 | 21 | 16 | 21 | 10 | 24 |
| 18 | (Norway) Espen Isaksætre | | | 7 | | 17 | | 16 |
| 19 | (Latvia) Arnis Odiņš | | | 15 | | 10 | | 13 |
| 20 | (France) Enzo Libner | | | | 10 | | | 10 |
| 21 | (Norway) Anders Bjørland Hansen | 21 | 15 | 13 | 14 | 16 | | 10 |
| 22 | (France) Julien Hardonnière | | | | 13 | | | 4 |
| 23 | (Czech Republic) Zdeněk Kučera | 14 | 19 | 24 | 23 | 19 | 18 | 3 |
| 24 | (Germany) Sven Seelinger | | 18 | | | | 14 | 3 |
| 25 | (Latvia) Mārtiņš Lapiņš | | | | | 14 | | 3 |
| 26 | (France) Rudolf Schafer | 15 | 16 | | 22 | | | 3 |
| 27 | (Norway) Lars-Christian Rosland | 20 | 17 | 16 | 19 | 25 | 19 | 1 |
| 28 | (Hungary) Zsolt Szíjj | 16 | 24 | 18 | | | | 1 |
| 29 | (Hungary) Marcell Kovács | | | | | | 16 | 1 |
| 30 | (Portugal) Mário Barbosa | 17 | 21 | | 21 | | | 0 |
| 31 | (France) Damien Meunier | | | | 17 | | | 0 |
| 32 | (Portugal) Mário Teixeira | 18 | | | | | | 0 |
| 33 | (Norway) Ada Marie Hvaal | | 25 | 20 | | | | 0 |
| 34 | (Norway) Marius Bermingrud | | | | | | 20 | 0 |
| 35 | (France) Patrice Durand | | | | 20 | | | 0 |
| 36 | (Netherlands) Marcel Snoeijers | | | | | 27 | 21 | 0 |
| 37 | (Estonia) Arvo Kask | | | 22 | | 22 | | 0 |
| 38 | (Czech Republic) Marcel Suchý | | | 23 | 27 | 26 | 22 | 0 |
| 39 | (Portugal) Nuno Araújo | 22 | | | | | | 0 |
| 40 | (Belgium) Davy Van Den Branden | | 22 | | | | | 0 |
| 41 | (Estonia) Andre Krug | | | | 26 | 23 | | 0 |
| 42 | (Portugal) Hélder Ribeiro | 23 | | | | | | 0 |
| 43 | (Denmark) Daniel Nielsen | | | | | | 23 | 0 |
| 44 | (Belgium) Nick Vanalken | | 23 | | | | | 0 |
| 45 | (Latvia) Edijs Ošs | | | | | 24 | | 0 |
| 46 | (Portugal) Antonio Sousa | 24 | | | | | | 0 |
| 47 | (Italy) Davide Medici | | | | 25 | | | 0 |
| 48 | (Italy) Max Vercelli | | 26 | | | | | 0 |
| 49 | (Hungary) Attila Mózer | | | | | 28 | | 0 |
| 50 | (France) Grégory Fosse | | | | 28 | | | 0 |
| 51 | (France) Anthony Jan | | | | 29 | | | 0 |
| 52 | (Italy) Luciano Visintin | | | | 30 | | | 0 |
| 53 | (France) Emmanuel Martin | | | | 32 | | | 0 |
| Pos. | Driver | POR (Portugal) | BEL (Belgium) | SWE (Sweden) | FRA (France) | LAT (Latvia) | GER (Germany) | Points |

=== TouringCar ===
| Pos. | Driver | BAR (Spain) | BEL (Belgium) | GBR (United Kingdom) | NOR (Norway) | GER (Germany) | Points |
|---|---|---|---|---|---|---|---|
| 1 | (Norway) Lars Øivind Enerberg | 6 | 1 | 1 | 1 | 7 | 123 |
| 2 | (Norway) Anders Nymoen Bråten | 4 | 2 | 5 | 8 | 3 | 107 |
| 3 | (Sweden) Philip Gehrman | 1 | 3 | 8 | 2 | 4 | 104 |
| 4 | (Belgium) Steve Volders | 8 | 5 | 2 | 6 | 5 | 91 |
| 5 | (Norway) David Nordgård | 3 | 12 | 6 | 4 | 2 | 86 |
| 6 | (Norway) Kjetil Larsen | 5 | 9 | 3 | 9 | 6 | 82 |
| 7 | (Norway) Ben-Phillip Gundersen | 10 | 7 | 4 | 7 | 1 | 79 |
| 8 | (Norway) Steinar Stokke | 9 | 4 | 7 | 5 | 9 | 60 |
| 9 | (Norway) Per Magne Røyrås | 2 | 13 | 9 | 10 | 12 | 49 |
| 10 | (Norway) Fredrik R. Magnussen | | | | 3 | | 23 |
| 11 | (Netherlands) Mandy Kasse | | 6 | 10 | | | 22 |
| 12 | (Norway) Kai Arne Homme | 7 | 14 | | 13 | | 21 |
| 13 | (Belgium) Danny De Beuckelaer | | 8 | | | | 12 |
| 14 | (Sweden) Fredrik Salsten | | | | | 8 | 10 |
| 15 | (Sweden) Sören Hedlund | | | | | 10 | 9 |
| 16 | (Norway) Petter Brauten | DSQ | 10 | | 14 | | 8 |
| 17 | (Belgium) Florent Hontoir | | 11 | | | | 8 |
| 18 | (Germany) Ralf Evers | | | | | 11 | 8 |
| 19 | (Norway) Camilla Antonsen | | | | 11 | | 8 |
| 20 | (Norway) Sivert Svardal | | | | 12 | | 7 |
| Pos. | Driver | BAR (Spain) | BEL (Belgium) | GBR (United Kingdom) | NOR (Norway) | GER (Germany) | Points |
