= 2015 FIA European Rallycross Championship =

FIA European Rallycross Championship season

The 2015 FIA European Rallycross Championship was the thirty-ninth season of the FIA European Championships for Rallycross Drivers. The season consisted of five rounds, commencing on 16 May with the Belgian round at Circuit Jules Tacheny Mettet, and culminating on 18 October, in Italy at Franciacorta.

== Calendar ==
Round	Event	Dates	Venue	Class	Final Winner	Car	Team	Report
1	Euro RX of Portugal	25–26 April	Pista Automóvel de Montalegre, Montalegre	Super1600	(Hungary) Krisztián Szabó	Škoda Fabia	(Hungary) MGAMS	report
2	Euro RX of Belgium	13–14 May	Circuit Jules Tacheny Mettet, Mettet					
2	Euro RX of Belgium	13–14 May	Circuit Jules Tacheny Mettet, Mettet	Supercar	(France) Jérôme Grosset-Janin	Peugeot 208	(United Kingdom) Albatec Racing	report
2	Euro RX of Belgium	13–14 May	Circuit Jules Tacheny Mettet, Mettet	Super1600	(Latvia) Janis Baumanis	Renault Twingo	(Finland) Set Promotion	report
2	Euro RX of Belgium	13–14 May	Circuit Jules Tacheny Mettet, Mettet	TouringCar	(Norway) Fredrik Magnussen	Ford Fiesta	(Norway) Fredrik Magnussen	report
3	(United Kingdom) Euro RX of Great Britain	23–24 May	Lydden Hill Race Circuit, Wootton	TouringCar	(Sweden) Fredrik Salsten	Citroën DS3	(Sweden) Salsten Racing	report
4	Euro RX of Germany	20–21 June	Estering, Buxtehude					
4	Euro RX of Germany	20–21 June	Estering, Buxtehude	Supercar	(Norway) Tommy Rustad	Volkswagen Polo	(Sweden) HTB Racing-Marklund Motorsport	report
4	Euro RX of Germany	20–21 June	Estering, Buxtehude	Super1600	(Denmark) Ulrik Linnemann	Peugeot 208	(Denmark) Linnemann Motorsport	report
4	Euro RX of Germany	20–21 June	Estering, Buxtehude	TouringCar	(Sweden) Fredrik Salsten	Citroën DS3	(Sweden) Salsten Racing	report
5	Euro RX of Sweden	4–5 July	Höljesbanan, Höljes					
5	Euro RX of Sweden	4–5 July	Höljesbanan, Höljes	Super1600	(Latvia) Janis Baumanis	Renault Twingo	(Finland) Set Promotion	report
5	Euro RX of Sweden	4–5 July	Höljesbanan, Höljes	TouringCar	(Sweden) Fredrik Salsten	Citroën DS3	(Sweden) Salsten Racing	report
6	Euro RX of Norway	22–23 August	Lånkebanen, Hell					
6	Euro RX of Norway	22–23 August	Lånkebanen, Hell	Supercar	(Norway) Tommy Rustad	Volkswagen Polo	(Sweden) HTB Racing-Marklund Motorsport	report
6	Euro RX of Norway	22–23 August	Lånkebanen, Hell	TouringCar	(Norway) Christian Sandmo	Mazda RX-8	(Norway) Christian Sandmo	report
7	Euro RX of France	5–6 September	Circuit de Lohéac, Lohéac	Super1600	(Denmark) Ulrik Linnemann	Peugeot 208	(Denmark) Linnemann Motorsport	report
8	(Spain) Euro RX of Barcelona	19–20 September	Circuit de Barcelona-Catalunya, Montmeló					
8	(Spain) Euro RX of Barcelona	19–20 September	Circuit de Barcelona-Catalunya, Montmeló	Supercar	(Norway) Ole Christian Veiby	Volkswagen Polo	Volkswagen Team Sweden	report
8	(Spain) Euro RX of Barcelona	19–20 September	Circuit de Barcelona-Catalunya, Montmeló	Super1600	(France) Andréa Dubourg	Renault Clio	(France) Andréa Dubourg	report
9	Euro RX of Italy	17–18 October	Franciacorta International Circuit, Franciacorta					
9	Euro RX of Italy	17–18 October	Franciacorta International Circuit, Franciacorta	Supercar	(Norway) Tommy Rustad	Volkswagen Polo	(Sweden) HTB Racing-Marklund Motorsport	report
9	Euro RX of Italy	17–18 October	Franciacorta International Circuit, Franciacorta	Super1600	(Denmark) Ulrik Linnemann	Peugeot 208	(Denmark) Linnemann Motorsport	report

== Entries ==
=== Supercar ===
Constructor	Entrant	Car	No.	Driver	Rounds
Ford	(Republic of Ireland) Oliver O'Donovan	Ford Fiesta	2	(Republic of Ireland) Oliver O'Donovan	All
Ford	(Sweden) Peter Hedström	Ford Fiesta	8	(Sweden) Peter Hedström	3-5
Ford	(Norway) Bermingrud Motorsport	Ford Fiesta	59	(Norway) Morten Bermingrud	3
Ford	(Norway) Stein Egil Jenssen	Ford Fiesta	61	(Norway) Stein Egil Jenssen	3
Ford	(Norway) CircleX	Ford Fiesta	63	(Norway) Svein Frustol	3
Ford	(Italy) Christian Giarolo	Ford Fiesta	80	(Italy) Christian Giarolo	4
Ford	(Norway) Knut Ove Børseth	Ford Fiesta	103	(Norway) Anders Bråten	5
Ford	(Belgium) Koen Pauwels	Ford Focus	22	(Belgium) Koen Pauwels	1-4
Ford	(United Kingdom) Mark Flaherty	Ford Focus	49	(United Kingdom) Mark Flaherty	2
Ford	(Belgium) Ecurie Bayard ASBL	Ford Focus	67	(Belgium) François Duval	1
Ford	(Germany) ADAC Team Hansa	Ford Focus	86	(Germany) Jörg Jockel	2
Škoda	(Sweden) Peter Hedström	Škoda Fabia	8	(Sweden) Peter Hedström	1-2
Škoda	(Hungary) Racing-Com KFT	Škoda Fabia	102	(Hungary) Tamás Kárai	1-2, 4
BMW Mini	(Finland) #MiniSuomi	Mini Countryman	12	(Finland) Riku Tahko	All
Hyundai	(Norway) Frode Holte Motorsport	Hyundai i20	14	(Norway) Frode Holte	1-4
Peugeot	(Sweden) Hansen Talent Development	Peugeot 208	16	(Hungary) Tamás Pál Kiss	5
Peugeot	(Sweden) Hansen Talent Development	Peugeot 208	111	(Sweden) Fredrik Salsten	4
Peugeot	(Sweden) Hansen Talent Development	Peugeot 208	199	(Latvia) Jānis Baumanis	3
Peugeot	(France) Pailler Competition	Peugeot 208	18	(France) Jonathan Pailler	1-2, 4-5
Peugeot	(France) Pailler Competition	Peugeot 208	20	(France) Fabien Pailler	1-2, 4-5
Peugeot	(United Kingdom) James Grint	Peugeot 208	27	(United Kingdom) James Grint	1, 4
Peugeot	(United Kingdom) Albatec Racing	Peugeot 208	27	(United Kingdom) James Grint	2-3, 5
Peugeot	(United Kingdom) Albatec Racing	Peugeot 208	74	(France) Jérôme Grosset-Janin	2-5
Peugeot	(France) Jérôme Grosset-Janin	Peugeot 208	74	(France) Jérôme Grosset-Janin	1
Volkswagen	(Sweden) HTB Marklund Motorsport	Volkswagen Polo	24	(Norway) Tommy Rustad	All
Volkswagen	Volkswagen Team Sweden	Volkswagen Polo	52	(Norway) Ole Christian Veiby	All
Volkswagen	(Sweden) RamonaRX	Volkswagen Scirocco	47	(Sweden) Ramona Karlsson	1-4
Volkswagen	(Belgium) OTRT	Volkswagen Scirocco	68	(Belgium) Ronny Schevenheels	1
Citroën	(Norway) JC Race Teknik	Citroën DS3	28	(Norway) Alexander Hvaal	4-5
Citroën	(Norway) Ole Kristian Temte	Citroën C4	30	(Norway) Ole Kristian Temte	5
Citroën	(France) Philippe Maloigne	Citroën C4	72	(France) Philippe Maloigne	4-5
Citroën	(France) Jean-Baptiste Dubourg	Citroën C4	87	(France) Jean-Baptiste Dubourg	All
Renault	(Norway) Ole Håbjørg	Renault Clio	35	(Norway) Ole Håbjørg	3
Renault	(Sweden) Helmia Motorsport	Renault Clio	48	(Sweden) Lukas Walfridson	All
Renault	(Norway) Ada Marie Hvaal	Renault Clio	58	(Norway) Stian Hafsengen	3
Saab	(Sweden) Eklund Motorsport	Saab 9-3	60	(Finland) Joni-Pekka Rajala	All
Volvo	(Norway) CircleX	Volvo C30	73	(Norway) Pål Try	3
Mitsubishi	(Poland) Robert Czarnecki	Mitsubishi Lancer	83	(Poland) Robert Czarnecki	5
Audi	(Hungary) Racing-Com KFT	Audi S1	102	(Hungary) Tamás Kárai	5

=== Super1600 ===
Constructor	Entrant	Car	No.	Driver	Round(s)
Audi	(France) Yvonnick Jagu	Audi A1	31	(France) Yvonnick Jagu	5
BMW Mini	(Finland) #MiniSuomi	Mini Countryman	27	(Finland) Kalle Markkanen	2
Citroën	(Netherlands) Willem Veltman	Citroën C2	26	(Netherlands) Willem Veltman	2
Citroën	(France) Jimmy Terpereau	Citroën C2	37	(France) Jimmy Terpereau	5
Citroën	(United Kingdom) Phil Chicken	Citroën C2	62	(United Kingdom) Phil Chicken	2
Citroën	(France) Maximilien Eveno	Citroën C2	75	(France) Maximilien Eveno	5
Citroën	(United Kingdom) Michael Boak	Citroën C2	81	(United Kingdom) Michael Boak	2
Citroën	(Belgium) OTRT	Citroën DS3	11	(Belgium) Davy Van Den Branden	All
Ford	(Czech Republic) LS Racing Czech National Team	Ford Fiesta	5	(Czech Republic) Ondřej Smetana	All
Ford	(Portugal) Mario Teixeira	Ford Fiesta	77	(Portugal) Mario Teixeira	6
Ford	(Estonia) Reinsalu Sport	Ford Ka	29	(Estonia) Robert Reinsalu	2, 4
Peugeot	(France) Emmanuel Martin	Peugeot 206	39	(France) Emmanuel Martin	5
Peugeot	(Denmark) Linnemann Motorsport	Peugeot 208	2	(Denmark) Ulrik Linnemann	All
Peugeot	(France) Rudolf Schafer	Peugeot 208	73	(France) Rudolf Schafer	5
Peugeot	(France) Emmanuel Galivel	Peugeot 208	93	(France) Emmanuel Galivel	5
Renault	(Italy) Mirko Zanni	Renault Clio	7	(Italy) Mirko Zanni	5-6
Renault	(Russia) TT Motorsport	Renault Clio	19	(Russia) Dmitry Bragin	7
Renault	(Russia) TT Motorsport	Renault Clio	98	(Russia) Egor Sanin	5
Renault	(France) Anthony Jan	Renault Clio	35	(France) Anthony Jan	5
Renault	(Italy) Davide Medici	Renault Clio	84	(Italy) Davide Medici	All
Renault	(Finland) SET Promotion	Renault Clio	89	(Russia) Timur Shigaboutdinov	All
Renault	(France) Andréa Dubourg	Renault Clio	92	(France) Andréa Dubourg	All
Renault	(Estonia) RS Racing Team	Renault Twingo	20	(Estonia) Siim Saluri	All
Renault	(Finland) SET Promotion	Renault Twingo	21	(Norway) Magnus Bergsjøbrenden	2-4
Renault	(Finland) SET Promotion	Renault Twingo	25	(Finland) Karoliina Leppihalme	1, 6-7
Renault	(Finland) SET Promotion	Renault Twingo	90	(Latvia) Artis Baumanis	5
Renault	(Finland) SET Promotion	Renault Twingo	99	(Latvia) Jānis Baumanis	All
Renault	(France) Enzo Libner	Renault Twingo	36	(France) Enzo Libner	5
Škoda	(Czech Republic) Pavel Vimmer	Škoda Fabia	3	(Czech Republic) Pavel Vimmer	All
Škoda	(Lithuania) ASK Vilkyciai	Škoda Fabia	6	(Lithuania) Kasparas Navickas	6-7
Škoda	(Germany) Andreas Steffen	Škoda Fabia	8	(Germany) Andreas Steffen	1-4
Škoda	(Estonia) Ligur Racing	Škoda Fabia	10	(Estonia) Janno Ligur	All
Škoda	(Hungary) O.Z.S Racing Team	Škoda Fabia	18	(Hungary) Lajos 'LUIGI' Gyula	All
Škoda	(Hungary) MGAMS KFT	Škoda Fabia	23	(Hungary) Krisztián Szabó	All
Škoda	(Germany) All-Inkl.com Münnich Motorsport	Škoda Fabia	38	(Germany) Mandie August	All
Škoda	(Estonia) Reinsalu Sport	Škoda Fabia	47	(Estonia) Andre Kurg	1-3
Škoda	(Russia) Nikita Misyulya	Škoda Fabia	50	(Russia) Nikita Misyulya	All
Volkswagen	(Lithuania) ASK Vilkyciai	Volkswagen Polo	16	(Lithuania) Ernestas Staponkus	All
Volkswagen	(France) Dominique Gerbaud	Volkswagen Polo	32	(France) Dominique Gerbaud	5
Volkswagen	(Norway) Lise Marie Sandmo	Volkswagen Polo	55	(Norway) Lise Marie Sandmo	2-4
Volkswagen	(Austria) Christian Petrakovits	Volkswagen Polo	83	(Austria) Christian Petrakovits	7

=== TouringCar ===
Constructor	Entrant	Car	No.	Driver	Round(s)
Citroën	(Sweden) Salsten Racing	Citroën DS3	11	(Sweden) Fredrik Salsten	All
Ford	(Norway) David Nordgård	Ford Fiesta	2	(Norway) David Nordgård	All
Ford	(Norway) Anders Bråten	Ford Fiesta	3	(Norway) Anders Bråten	All
Ford	(Sweden) Magda Andersson	Ford Fiesta	7	(Sweden) Magda Andersson	All
Ford	(Norway) Geir Hagadokken	Ford Fiesta	8	(Norway) Geir Hagadokken	4
Ford	(Norway) Fredrik Magnussen	Ford Fiesta	12	(Norway) Fredrik Magnussen	All
Ford	(Norway) Camilla Antonsen	Ford Fiesta	15	(Norway) Camilla Antonsen	All
Ford	(Norway) Ben-Philip Gundersen	Ford Fiesta	16	(Norway) Ben-Philip Gundersen	All
Ford	(Norway) Torleif Lona	Ford Fiesta	73	(Norway) Torleif Lona	All
Ford	(Netherlands) Mandy Kasse	Ford Fiesta	88	(Netherlands) Mandy Kasse	1-3
Ford	(Sweden) Philip Gehrman	Ford Fiesta	95	(Sweden) Philip Gehrman	All
Mazda	(Norway) Jan Gabrielsen	Mazda RX-8	29	(Norway) Jan Gabrielsen	All
Mazda	(Norway) Christian Sandmo	Mazda RX-8	55	(Norway) Christian Sandmo	All
Mazda	(Norway) Tom Daniel Tånevik	Mazda RX-8	64	(Norway) Tom Daniel Tånevik	All
Opel	(Norway) Petter Brauten	Opel Corsa	86	(Norway) Petter Brauten	5
Peugeot	(Norway) Per Magne Røyrås	Peugeot 206	5	(Norway) Per Magne Røyrås	All
Peugeot	(Sweden) RMM-Byggplat	Peugeot 207	63	(Sweden) Lars Rosendahl	All
Škoda	(Norway) Kjetil Larsen	Škoda Fabia	4	(Norway) Kjetil Larsen	All
Toyota	(Sweden) Sören Hedlund	Toyota Auris	83	(Sweden) Sören Hedlund	1, 3-4
Volvo	(Sweden) Daniel Lundh	Volvo C30	6	(Sweden) Daniel Lundh	All
Volvo	(Norway) Cato Erga	Volvo C30	30	(Norway) Cato Erga	1-2

=== RX Lites Cup ===
Entrant	No.	Drivers	Rounds
JC RACE TEKNIK	3	(Sweden) Per Björnson	3
JC RACE TEKNIK	95	(Norway) Ada Marie Hvaal	3
JC RACE TEKNIK	97	(United Kingdom) Tristan Ovenden	2
JC RACE TEKNIK	99	(Norway) Joachim Hvaal	All
Garret Grist	5	(Canada) Garret Grist	4
Olsbergs MSE	6	(United Kingdom) Tom Onslow-Cole	7
Olsbergs MSE	20	(Norway) Oscar Solberg	5
Olsbergs MSE	39	(Sweden) Kevin Eriksson	1-3, 5-8
Olsbergs MSE	51	(Sweden) Sandra Hultgren	1-3, 5
Olsbergs MSE	77	(France) Cyril Raymond	4, 6
Olsbergs MSE	78	(United States) Austin Cindric	8
Olsbergs MSE	89	(Sweden) Andreas Wernersson	3
Olsbergs MSE	98	(Sweden) Oliver Eriksson	1-2, 4-5, 8
LOTTO TEAM	7	(Poland) Krzysztof Hołowczyc	1-2, 5-8
LOTTO TEAM	69	(Poland) Martin Kaczmarski	1-2, 5-8
Set Promotion	8	(Norway) Simon Wågø Syversen	1-3, 5-8
TBRX	16	(Norway) Thomas Bryntesson	2-3, 5-8
Alex Tagliani	18	(Canada) Alex Tagliani	4
Kyle Kaiser	19	(United States) Kyle Kaiser	4
Helmia Motorsport	21	(Sweden) Andreas Persson	3
Helmia Motorsport	73	(Sweden) Jonathan Walfridsson	3
Andrew Ranger	27	(Canada) Andrew Ranger	4
TOKSPORT WRT	33	(Kenya) Tejas Hirani	6-8
TOKSPORT WRT	44	(Spain) Laia Sanz	6
TOKSPORT WRT	96	(Qatar) Halid Al-Suwaidi	7
Alexander Westlund	47	(Sweden) Alexander Westlund	3
Simon Olofsson	52	(Sweden) Simon Olofsson	1-3, 5-6, 8
Thomas Holmen	56	(Norway) Thomas Holmen	3, 5
Peugeot Red Bull Hansen Junior Team	71	(Sweden) Kevin Hansen	1-3, 5-8
Brink Motorsport	77	(Sweden) Tobias Brink	1-3
Alejandro Fernández	126	(Colombia) Alejandro Fernández	4, 6

== Championship Standings ==
=== Supercar ===
Pos.	Driver	BEL (Belgium)	GER (Germany)	NOR (Norway)	ESP (Spain)	ITA (Italy)	Points
1	(Norway) Tommy Rustad	4	1	1	6	1	135
2	(France) Jérôme Grosset-Janin	1	2	4	5	5	117
3	(Norway) Ole Christian Veiby	2	7	18	1	3	86
4	(Finland) Joni-Pekka Rajala	7	5	2	3	8	86
5	(France) Jean-Baptiste Dubourg	8	4	7	13	2	77
6	(France) Fabien Pailler	9	3		8	13	47
7	(Norway) Frode Holte	5	8	6	20		45
8	(Republic of Ireland) Oliver O'Donovan	13	9	5	4	15	41
9	(Norway) Alexander Hvaal				2	7	33
10	(France) Jonathan Pailler	10	6		9	9	32
11	(Hungary) Tamás Kárai	3	16		10	12	32
12	(Sweden) Peter Hedström	16	11	8	12	4	31
13	(United Kingdom) James Grint	14	10	10	17	14	24
14	(Latvia) Jānis Baumanis			3			23
15	(Sweden) Lukas Walfridson	11	17	13	14	11	23
16	(Belgium) Koen Pauwels	12	12	11	18		22
17	(Belgium) François Duval	6					21
18	(Hungary) Tamás Pál Kiss					6	20
19	(France) Philippe Maloigne				11	10	17
20	(Sweden) Fredrik Salsten				7		15
21	(Norway) Stein Egil Jenssen			9			11
22	(Norway) Stian Hafsengen			12			11
23	(Sweden) Ramona Karlsson	15	14	17	19		5
24	(Finland) Riku Tahko	17	15	16	15	19	5
25	(United Kingdom) Mark Flaherty		13				4
26	(Norway) Morten Bergminrud			14			3
27	(Norway) Svein Frustol			15			2
28	(Italy) Christian Giarolo				16		1
29	(Norway) Anders Bråten					16	1

=== Super1600 ===
Pos.	Driver	POR (Portugal)	BEL (Belgium)	GER (Germany)	SWE (Sweden)	FRA (France)	BAR (Spain)	ITA (Italy)	Points
1	(Latvia) Jānis Baumanis	3	1	5	1	7	3	6	158
2	(Denmark) Ulrik Linnemann	9	7	1	7	1	19	1	134
3	(Hungary) Krisztián Szabó	1	6	3	5	9	2	5	128
4	(Russia) Nikita Misyulya	6	2	7	2	11	4	4	120
5	(France) Andréa Dubourg	2	3	18	8	2	1	10	109
6	(Russia) Timur Shigabutdinov	7	5	2	14	3	14	2	109
7	(Lithuania) Ernestas Staponkus	5	12	4	9	12	6	13	86
8	(Italy) Davide Medici	15	13	9	11	4	5	7	85
9	(Czech Republic) Ondřej Smetana	4	4	16	6	27	10	16	60
10	(Estonia) Janno Ligur	8	22	6	10	8	8	19	57
11	(Norway) Magnus Bergsjøbrenden		8	10	3				47
12	(Estonia) Siim Saluri	16	11	12	13	15	7	9	47
13	(Czech Republic) Pavel Vimmer	11	10	14	15	16	9	8	44
14	(Hungary) "Luigi"	12	18	11	4	19	18	12	41
15	(Germany) Andreas Steffen	10	20	8	12				30
16	(Russia) Egor Sanin					6			22
17	(Belgium) Davy Van Den Branden	13	9	13	17	26	13	18	22
18	(Russia) Dmitry Bragin							3	19
19	(France) Maximilien Eveno					5			18
20	(France) Enzo Libner					10			10
21	(Italy) Mirko Zanni					18	12		8
22	(Portugal) Mário Teixeira						11		8
22=	(Austria) Christian Petrakovits							11	8
24	(Finland) Karoliina Leppihalme	14					15	14	8
25	(Germany) Mandie August	18	16	15	16	22	16	17	5
26	(France) Jimmy Terpereau					13			4
27	(Norway) Lise Marie Sandmo		14	17	18				3
27=	(Latvia) Artis Baumanis					14			3
29	(Netherlands) Willem Veltman		15						2
29=	(Lithuania) Kasparas Navickas						17	15	2

=== TouringCar ===
Pos.	Driver	BEL (Belgium)	GBR (United Kingdom)	GER (Germany)	SWE (Sweden)	NOR (Norway)	Points
1	(Sweden) Fredrik Salsten	14	1	1	1	2	113
2	(Norway) Fredrik Magnussen	1	13	8	2	4	87
3	(Norway) David Nordgård	4	12	6	5	7	84
4	(Sweden) Magda Andersson	12	5	2	3	8	81
5	(Norway) Ben-Philip Gundersen	8	2	4	7	9	80
6	(Norway) Jan Gabrielsen	5	7	7	9	13	64
7	(Norway) Anders Bråten	2	6	9	17	10	62
8	(Norway) Tom Daniel Tånevik	3	9	11	13	6	62
9	(Sweden) Daniel Lundh	10	4	14	10	12	55
10	(Sweden) Philip Gehrman	9	8	10	8	16	54
11	(Norway) Camilla Antonsen	7	3	12	6	17	52
12	(Norway) Christian Sandmo	15	15	18	4	1	51
13	(Norway) Kjetil Larsen	16	18	3	11	3	45
14	(Norway) Per Magne Røyrås	6	11	16	14	11	37
15	(Norway) Torleif Lona	DSQ	17	5	16	5	30
16	(Netherlands) Mandy Kasse	13	10	13			17
17	(Norway) Cato Erga	11	16				9
18	(Sweden) Lars Rosendahl	17	14	17	15	15	7
19	(Norway) Geir Hagadokken				12		6
20	(Norway) Petter Brauten					14	3
21	(Sweden) Sören Hedlund	18		15	18		2
