= Misyulya =

Misyulya is a surname. Notable people with the surname include:

- Yevgeniy Misyulya (born 1964), Belarusian race walker
- Natalya Misyulya (born 1966), Belarusian race walker, wife of Yevgeniy
- Nikita Misyulya (born 1990), Russian racing driver
