= 2014 European Rallycross Championship =

FIA European Rallycross Championship season

The 2014 European Rallycross Championship was the thirty-eighth season of the FIA European Championships for Rallycross Drivers. The season consisted of five rounds, commencing on 24 May with the British round at Lydden Hill Race Circuit, and culminating on 28 September, at Italy at Franciacorta.

The Supercar title was won by Sweden's Robin Larsson, while the supporting Super 1600 and Touringcar titles were won by Sergej Zagumennov and Daniel Lundh respectively.

== Calendar ==
Round	Event	Dates	Venue	Class	Final Winner	Car	Team	Report
1	Euro RX of Portugal	3–4 May	Pista Automóvel de Montalegre, Montalegre					
1	Euro RX of Portugal	3–4 May	Pista Automóvel de Montalegre, Montalegre	Super1600	(Russia) Sergey Zagumennov	Škoda Fabia	(Russia) Sergey Zagumennov	report
1	Euro RX of Portugal	3–4 May	Pista Automóvel de Montalegre, Montalegre	TouringCar	(Norway) Torleif Lona	Ford Fiesta	(Norway) Torleif Lona	report
2	(United Kingdom) Euro RX of Great Britain	24–25 May	Lydden Hill Race Circuit, Wootton					
2	(United Kingdom) Euro RX of Great Britain	24–25 May	Lydden Hill Race Circuit, Wootton	Supercar	(Sweden) Robin Larsson	Audi A1	(Sweden) Larsson Jernberg Motorsport	report
2	(United Kingdom) Euro RX of Great Britain	24–25 May	Lydden Hill Race Circuit, Wootton	Super1600	(Russia) Sergey Zagumennov	Škoda Fabia	(Russia) Sergey Zagumennov	report
2	(United Kingdom) Euro RX of Great Britain	24–25 May	Lydden Hill Race Circuit, Wootton	TouringCar	(Sweden) Daniel Lundh	Volvo C30	(Sweden) Daniel Lundh	report
3	Euro RX of Norway	14–15 June	Lånkebanen, Hell					
3	Euro RX of Norway	14–15 June	Lånkebanen, Hell	Supercar	(United States) Ken Block	Ford Fiesta	(United States) Hoonigan Racing Division	report
3	Euro RX of Norway	14–15 June	Lånkebanen, Hell	Super1600	(Latvia) Jānis Baumanis	Renault Twingo	(Finland) Set Promotion	report
3	Euro RX of Norway	14–15 June	Lånkebanen, Hell	TouringCar	(Norway) Tom Daniel Tånevik	Mazda RX-8	(Norway) Tom Daniel Tånevik	report
4	Euro RX of Finland	28–29 June	Tykkimäen Moottorirata, Kouvola					
4	Euro RX of Finland	28–29 June	Tykkimäen Moottorirata, Kouvola	Super1600	(Russia) Nikita Misyulya	Škoda Fabia	(Russia) Nikita Misyulya	report
4	Euro RX of Finland	28–29 June	Tykkimäen Moottorirata, Kouvola	TouringCar	(Sweden) Daniel Lundh	Volvo C30	(Sweden) Daniel Lundh	report
5	Euro RX of Sweden	5–6 July	Höljesbanan, Höljes					report
5	Euro RX of Sweden	5–6 July	Höljesbanan, Höljes	Super1600	(Russia) Sergey Zagumennov	Škoda Fabia	(Russia) Sergey Zagumennov	report
5	Euro RX of Sweden	5–6 July	Höljesbanan, Höljes	TouringCar	(Norway) Tom Daniel Tånevik	Mazda RX-8	(Norway) Tom Daniel Tånevik	report
6	Euro RX of Belgium	12–13 July	Circuit Jules Tacheny Mettet, Mettet					
6	Euro RX of Belgium	12–13 July	Circuit Jules Tacheny Mettet, Mettet	Supercar	(Sweden) Robin Larsson	Audi A1	(Sweden) Larsson Jernberg Motorsport	report
6	Euro RX of Belgium	12–13 July	Circuit Jules Tacheny Mettet, Mettet	Super1600	(Latvia) Jānis Baumanis	Renault Twingo	(Finland) Set Promotion	report
6	Euro RX of Belgium	12–13 July	Circuit Jules Tacheny Mettet, Mettet	TouringCar	(Belgium) Filip Baelus	Volvo C30	(Belgium) OTRT	report
7	Euro RX of France	6–7 September	Circuit de Lohéac, Lohéac					
7	Euro RX of France	6–7 September	Circuit de Lohéac, Lohéac	Super1600	(France) Steven Bossard	Renault Clio	(France) Steven Bossard	report
7	Euro RX of France	6–7 September	Circuit de Lohéac, Lohéac	TouringCar	(Norway) David Nordgård	Ford Fiesta	(Norway) David Nordgård	report
8	Euro RX of Germany	20–21 September	Estering, Buxtehude					
8	Euro RX of Germany	20–21 September	Estering, Buxtehude	Supercar	(Sweden) Mattias Ekström	Audi S1	(Sweden) EKS RX	report
8	Euro RX of Germany	20–21 September	Estering, Buxtehude	Super1600	(Latvia) Jānis Baumanis	Renault Twingo	(Finland) Set Promotion	report
8	Euro RX of Germany	20–21 September	Estering, Buxtehude	TouringCar	(Norway) Camilla Antonsen	Ford Fiesta	(Norway) Camilla Antonsen	report
9	Euro RX of Italy	27–28 September	Franciacorta International Circuit, Franciacorta					
9	Euro RX of Italy	27–28 September	Franciacorta International Circuit, Franciacorta	Supercar	(Sweden) Johan Kristoffersson	Volkswagen Polo	(Sweden) Volkswagen Dealer Team KMS	report
9	Euro RX of Italy	27–28 September	Franciacorta International Circuit, Franciacorta	Super1600	(Russia) Nikita Misyulya	Škoda Fabia	(Russia) Nikita Misyulya	report
9	Euro RX of Italy	27–28 September	Franciacorta International Circuit, Franciacorta	TouringCar	(Norway) Anders Bråten	Ford Fiesta	(Norway) Anders Bråten	report

== Entries ==
=== Supercar ===
Entries
Constructor	Entrant	Car	No.	Driver	Round(s)
Audi	(Sweden) Larsson Jernberg Motorsport	Audi A1	4	(Sweden) Robin Larsson	All
Audi	(Sweden) EKS RX	Audi S1	5	(Sweden) Pontus Tidemand	2–5
Audi	(Sweden) EKS RX	Audi S1	10	(Sweden) Mattias Ekström	2, 4
Audi	(Sweden) EKS RX	Audi S1	79	(Sweden) Edward Sandström	3, 5
Audi	(Germany) All-Inkl.com Münnich Motorsport	Audi S3	49	(Germany) René Münnich	4–5
Citroën	(France) Alexandre Theuil	Citroën DS3	6	(France) Alexandre Theuil	1, 3–5
Citroën	(Sweden) Öhman Racing	Citroën DS3	7	(Sweden) Emil Öhman	All
Citroën	(Sweden) Öhman Racing	Citroën DS3	17	(Sweden) Mats Öhman	1–2, 4
Citroën	(Sweden) Eric Färén	Citroën DS3	40	(Sweden) Eric Färén	1
Citroën	(United Kingdom) LD Motorsports	Citroën DS3	27	(France) Davy Jeanney	3–5
Citroën	(United Kingdom) LD Motorsports	Citroën DS3	44	(Poland) Krzysztof Skorupski	1–2
Citroën	(United Kingdom) LD Motorsports	Citroën DS3	88	(Norway) Henning Solberg	4–5
Citroën	(Sweden) PSRX	Citroën DS3	95	(Italy) Simone Romagna	4–5
Citroën	(Norway) Morten Bergminrud	Citroën C4	30	(Norway) Morten Bergminrud	2, 4–5
Citroën	(Latvia) TT Motorsport	Citroën C4	63	(Russia) Roman Stepanenko	5
Ford	(Norway) Tore Kristofferson	Ford Fiesta	31	(Norway) Tore Kristofferson	2, 5
Ford	(Czech Republic) Czech National Team	Ford Fiesta	37	(Czech Republic) Pavel Koutný	1–3, 5
Ford	(United Kingdom) Julian Godfrey	Ford Fiesta	51	(United Kingdom) Julian Godfrey	1
Ford	(Belgium) OTRT	Ford Fiesta	70	(Belgium) Patrick Van Mechelen	3
Ford	(Italy) Erwin Untersalmberger	Ford Fiesta	102	(Italy) Erwin Untersalmberger	5
Ford	(United States) Hoonigan Racing Division	Ford Fiesta ST	43	(United States) Ken Block	2
Ford	(Sweden) Olsbergs MSE	Ford Fiesta ST	73	(Norway) Daniel Holten	2
Ford	(Sweden) Olsbergs MSE	Ford Fiesta ST	77	(United Kingdom) Andrew Jordan	1
Ford	(Sweden) Olsbergs MSE	Ford Fiesta ST	111	(Sweden) Richard Göransson	5
Ford	(Sweden) Olsbergs MSE	Ford Fiesta ST	125	(Italy) Gigi Galli	5
Ford	(Republic of Ireland) Oliver O'Donovan	Ford Focus	2	(Republic of Ireland) Oliver O'Donovan	1
Ford	(Belgium) Koen Pauwels	Ford Focus	22	(Belgium) Koen Pauwels	1–4
Ford	(Norway) Stein Egil Jenssen	Ford Focus	36	(Norway) Stein Egil Jenssen	4
Ford	(Italy) Christian Giarolo	Ford Focus	46	(Italy) Christian Giarolo	5
Ford	(Germany) ACN Buxtehude	Ford Focus	86	(Germany) Jörg Jockel	4
Hyundai	(Norway) Frode Holte Motorsport	Hyundai i20	14	(Norway) Frode Holte	1–2, 4
Peugeot	(France) Pailler Racing	Peugeot 208	19	(France) Jean-Luc Pailler	1
Peugeot	(France) Pailler Racing	Peugeot 208	20	(France) Fabien Pailler	1
Peugeot	(United Kingdom) Albatec Racing	Peugeot 208 GTi	27	(France) Davy Jeanney	1
Peugeot	(United Kingdom) Albatec Racing	Peugeot 208 GTi	47	(Sweden) Ramona Karlsson	4
Renault	(Norway) Ole Håbjørg	Renault Clio	35	(Norway) Ole Håbjørg	2
Renault	(Sweden) Helmia Motorsport	Renault Clio	48	(Sweden) Lukas Walfridson	All
Renault	(Sweden) Helmia Motorsport	Renault Clio	99	(Norway) Tord Linnerud	All
Renault	(France) Jérôme Grosset-Janin	Renault Clio	74	(France) Jérôme Grosset-Janin	All
Saab	(Sweden) Eklund Motorsport	Saab 9-3	47	(Sweden) Ramona Karlsson	1–2
Saab	(Sweden) Eklund Motorsport	Saab 9-3	88	(Norway) Henning Solberg	1–3
Saab	(Sweden) Eklund Motorsport	Saab 9-3	101	(Sweden) Per Eklund	4
Saab	(Sweden) Eklund Motorsport	Saab 9-3	105	(Sweden) Linus Westman	5
SEAT	(Denmark) Dennis Rømer	SEAT Córdoba	29	(Denmark) Dennis Rømer	4
Škoda	(Sweden) Hedströms Motorsport	Škoda Fabia	8	(Sweden) Peter Hedström	All
Škoda	(Sweden) Hedströms Motorsport	Škoda Fabia	100	(Sweden) Per-Gunnar Andersson	4
Škoda	(Germany) Bernd Schomaker	Škoda Fabia	38	(Germany) Bernd Schomaker	4
Škoda	(Belgium) Ronny Scheveneels	Škoda Fabia	68	(Belgium) Ronny Scheveneels	3
Škoda	(Hungary) Racing-Com Kft.	Škoda Fabia	102	(Hungary) Tamás Kárai	5
Škoda	(Hungary) Nyirád Motorsport	Škoda Fabia	104	(Hungary) Attila Mózer	5
Volkswagen	(Sweden) Marklund Motorsport	Volkswagen Polo	34	(United States) Tanner Foust	1
Volkswagen	(Sweden) Marklund Motorsport	Volkswagen Polo	67	(Belgium) François Duval	3
Volkswagen	(Sweden) Marklund Motorsport	Volkswagen Polo	90	(Germany) Ronny Wechselberger	4
Volkswagen	(Sweden) Volkswagen Dealer Team KMS	Volkswagen Polo	52	(Norway) Ole Christian Veiby	3
Volkswagen	(Sweden) Volkswagen Dealer Team KMS	Volkswagen Polo	53	(Sweden) Johan Kristoffersson	3–5
Volkswagen	(Belgium) De Bokkenrijders	Volkswagen Scirocco	9	(Belgium) Michaël De Keersmaecker	3
Volkswagen	(Belgium) OTRT	Volkswagen Scirocco	69	(Belgium) Jochen Coox	1, 4
Volvo	(Norway) HTB Racing	Volvo C30	24	(Norway) Tommy Rustad	All
Volvo	(Norway) Ole Kristian Nøttveit	Volvo C30	32	(Norway) Ole Kristian Nøttveit	2
Volvo	(Norway) DWC Racing	Volvo C30	91	(Norway) Guttorm Lindefjäll	4

=== Super1600 ===
Constructor	Entrant	Car	No.	Driver	Round(s)
Audi	(France) Yvonnick Jagu	Audi A1	31	(France) Yvonnick Jagu	7
Citroën	(Czech Republic) Adell Mogul Racing Team	Citroën C2	4	(Czech Republic) Jaroslav Vančík	2
Citroën	(Netherlands) Willem Veltman	Citroën C2	26	(Netherlands) Willem Veltman	6
Citroën	(Estonia) RS Racing Team	Citroën C2	27	(Estonia) Siim Saluri	All
Citroën	(Denmark) Jan Petersen	Citroën C2	45	(Denmark) Jan Petersen	8
Citroën	(United Kingdom) Phil Chicken	Citroën C2	62	(United Kingdom) Phil Chicken	2
Citroën	(France) Maximilien Eveno	Citroën C2	75	(France) Maximilien Eveno	7
Citroën	(Norway) Solberg Rally Event	Citroën C2	88	(Norway) Oscar Solberg	3, 5
Citroën	(Belgium) OTRT	Citroën DS3	11	(Belgium) Davy Van Den Branden	2, 6–8
Citroën	(France) Rudolf Schafer	Citroën DS3	25	(France) Rudolf Schafer	1–2, 7–9
Citroën	(Norway) Espen Isaksætre	Citroën Saxo	8	(Norway) Espen Isaksætre	3, 5
Citroën	(France) Jimmy Terpereau	Citroën Saxo	37	(France) Jimmy Terpereau	7
Citroën	(Portugal) José Polónio	Citroën Saxo	41	(Portugal) José Polónio	1
Citroën	(France) Philippe Maloigne	Citroën Saxo	71	(France) Philippe Maloigne	7
Dacia	(France) Fabien Grosset-Janin	Dacia Sandero	79	(France) Fabien Grosset-Janin	7
Ford	(Czech Republic) LS Racing	Ford Fiesta	5	(Czech Republic) Ondřej Smetana	All
Ford	(Norway) Glenn Haug	Ford Fiesta	9	(Norway) Glenn Haug	3, 5
Ford	(Belgium) Nat. Renstal Trommelke	Ford Fiesta	21	(Belgium) Dennis Remans	6
Ford	(Netherlands) Thijs Heezen	Ford Fiesta	28	(Netherlands) Thijs Heezen	5
Ford	(Portugal) António Teixeira	Ford Fiesta	42	(Portugal) António Teixeira	1
Opel	(Denmark) Peter Lindgaard	Opel Corsa C	17	(Denmark) Peter Lindgaard	5, 8
Opel	(Norway) Preben Myklebust	Opel Corsa C	48	(Norway) Preben Myklebust	8
Peugeot	(France) Emmanuel Martin	Peugeot 206	39	(France) Emmanuel Martin	7
Peugeot	(Czech Republic) Czech National Team	Peugeot 206	66	(Czech Republic) Václav Veverka	1
Peugeot	(Belgium) Nat. Renstal Trommelke	Peugeot 206	80	(Belgium) Bart Stouten	6
Peugeot	(Norway) Lars Otto Holt	Peugeot 207	14	(Norway) Lina Maria Holt	3, 5
Peugeot	(Norway) Even Hvaal	Peugeot 207	23	(Norway) Ada Marie Hvaal	3, 5
Peugeot	(France) Michel Vigouroux	Peugeot 207	34	(France) Michel Vigouroux	7
Peugeot	(Denmark) Linnemann Motorsport	Peugeot 208	2	(Denmark) Ulrik Linnemann	All
Peugeot	(France) Emmanuel Galivel	Peugeot 208	93	(France) Emmanuel Galivel	7
Renault	(Finland) SET Promotion	Renault Clio	19	(Norway) Simon Syversen	5
Renault	(Finland) SET Promotion	Renault Clio	59	(France) Stéphane Dréan	7
Renault	(Norway) Magnus Bergsjøbrenden	Renault Clio	20	(Norway) Magnus Bergsjøbrenden	5
Renault	(Belgium) Dave Van Beers	Renault Clio	29	(Belgium) Dave Van Beers	2, 6
Renault	(Germany) Ralph Wilhelm	Renault Clio	30	(Germany) Ralph Wilhelm	8
Renault	(France) Jean-Louis Poirier	Renault Clio	33	(France) Jean-Louis Poirier	7
Renault	(France) Anthony Jan	Renault Clio	40	(France) Anthony Jan	7
Renault	(France) Steven Bossard	Renault Clio	69	(France) Steven Bossard	7
Renault	(Italy) Silvano Ruga	Renault Clio	82	(Italy) Silvano Ruga	6
Renault	(Italy) Mirko Zanni	Renault Clio	81	(Italy) Mirko Zanni	5
Renault	(Italy) Davide Medici	Renault Clio	84	(Italy) Davide Medici	7, 9
Renault	(France) Andréa Dubourg	Renault Clio	92	(France) Andréa Dubourg	7
Renault	(France) Cyril Raymond	Renault Twingo	35	(France) Cyril Raymond	7
Renault	(France) Evan Libner	Renault Twingo	36	(France) Evan Libner	7
Renault	(Russia) STK Namus	Renault Twingo	46	(Russia) Rasul Minnikhanov	1–6
Renault	(Finland) SET Promotion	Renault Twingo	89	(Russia) Timur Shigaboutdinov	All
Renault	(Finland) SET Promotion	Renault Twingo	99	(Latvia) Jānis Baumanis	All
Škoda	(Czech Republic) Pavel Vimmer	Škoda Fabia	3	(Czech Republic) Pavel Vimmer	All
Škoda	(Lithuania) RIMO	Škoda Fabia	6	(Lithuania) Kasparas Navickas	1–6
Škoda	(Russia) Denis Salikov	Škoda Fabia	7	(Russia) Denis Salikov	1, 3, 6–9
Škoda	(Estonia) Ligur Racing	Škoda Fabia	10	(Estonia) Janno Ligur	3–6, 8–9
Škoda	(Czech Republic) Zdeněk Kučera	Škoda Fabia	13	(Czech Republic) Zdeněk Kučera	1–2
Škoda	(Russia) Sergej Zagumennov	Škoda Fabia	16	(Russia) Sergej Zagumennov	All
Škoda	(Hungary) O.Z.S Racing Team	Škoda Fabia	18	(Hungary) Lajos 'LUIGI' Gyula	5, 8–9
Škoda	(Germany) ACN Buxtehude	Škoda Fabia	22	(Germany) Andreas Steffen	1–6, 8–9
Škoda	(Germany) All-Inkl.com Münnich Motorsport	Škoda Fabia	38	(Germany) Mandie August	5, 8–9
Škoda	(Germany) Clemens Meyer	Škoda Fabia	44	(Germany) Clemens Meyer	8
Škoda	(Estonia) Reinsalu Sport	Škoda Fabia	47	(Estonia) Andre Kurg	4
Škoda	(Russia) Nikita Misyulya	Škoda Fabia	50	(Russia) Nikita Misyulya	All
Škoda	(Hungary) MGAMS Szolgaltato	Škoda Fabia	51	(Hungary) Krisztián Szabó	9
Škoda	(Hungary) MF-Motorsport	Škoda Fabia	98	(Hungary) Gergely Marton	9
Toyota	(Belgium) Nat. Renstal Trommelke	Toyota Yaris	24	(Belgium) Danny Luyten	6
Volkswagen	(Lithuania) ASK Vilkyciai	Volkswagen Polo	15	(Lithuania) Ernestas Staponkus	2–5, 7–9
Volkswagen	(France) Dominique Gerbaud	Volkswagen Polo	32	(France) Dominique Gerbaud	7
Volkswagen	(Norway) Lise Marie Sandmo	Volkswagen Polo	55	(Norway) Lise Marie Sandmo	3, 5
Volkswagen	(Austria) RCC Süd	Volkswagen Polo	83	(Austria) Christian Petrakovits	2, 6–8

=== TouringCar ===
Constructor	Entrant	Car	No.	Driver	Round(s)
BMW	(Estonia) Elea Racing	BMW 120	89	(Estonia) Ruve Veski	4–5
Citroën	(Sweden) Salsten Racing	Citroën DS3	11	(Sweden) Fredrik Salsten	1–7
Citroën	(Norway) Ernst Holten Leifsen	Citroën DS3	17	(Norway) Ernst Holten Leifsen	5
Citroën	(Norway) Robert Aamodt	Citroën C4	93	(Norway) Robert Aamodt	3, 5
Citroën	(Norway) Christian Sandmo	Citroën Xsara	55	(Norway) Christian Sandmo	3, 5
Ford	(Norway) David Nordgård	Ford Fiesta	2	(Norway) David Nordgård	2–3, 5, 7–8
Ford	(Norway) Anders Bråten	Ford Fiesta	3	(Norway) Anders Bråten	All
Ford	(Norway) Fredrik Magnussen	Ford Fiesta	12	(Norway) Fredrik Magnussen	3, 5
Ford	(Norway) Kjetil Tangen	Ford Fiesta	14	(Norway) Kjetil Tangen	3–9
Ford	(Norway) Camilla Antonsen	Ford Fiesta	15	(Norway) Camilla Antonsen	3, 5, 8
Ford	(Norway) Ben-Philip Gundersen	Ford Fiesta	16	(Norway) Ben-Philip Gundersen	3, 5, 8
Ford	(Finland) Pekka Mustakallio	Ford Fiesta	18	(Finland) Pekka Mustakallio	4–5
Ford	(Finland) Jari Järvenpää	Ford Fiesta	19	(Finland) Jari Järvenpää	4–5
Ford	(Belgium) OTRT	Ford Fiesta	20	(Belgium) Nick Snoeys	6
Ford	(Sweden) Roger Enlund	Ford Fiesta	42	(Sweden) Roger Enlund	5
Ford	(Finland) Tomi Koirikivi	Ford Fiesta	43	(Finland) Tomi Koirikivi	4
Ford	(Norway) Torleif Lona	Ford Fiesta	73	(Norway) Torleif Lona	All
Ford	(Netherlands) Mandy Kasse	Ford Fiesta	88	(Netherlands) Mandy Kasse	2, 6–7
Ford	(Sweden) Philip Gehrman	Ford Fiesta	95	(Sweden) Philip Gehrman	5
Ford	(Norway) Hans Børge Ovesen	Ford Focus	10	(Norway) Hans Børge Ovesen	5
Mazda	(Norway) Atle Vik	Mazda RX-8	9	(Norway) Atle Vik	3
Mazda	(Norway) Tom Daniel Tånevik	Mazda RX-8	64	(Norway) Tom Daniel Tånevik	2–3, 5
Peugeot	(Norway) Per Magne Røyrås	Peugeot 206	5	(Norway) Per Magne Røyrås	2–3, 5, 9
Peugeot	(Portugal) José Fábrica	Peugeot 206	41	(Portugal) José Fábrica	1
Škoda	(Norway) Kjetil Larsen	Škoda Fabia	4	(Norway) Kjetil Larsen	All
Volkswagen	(Belgium) RT Titanic	Volkswagen Polo	49	(Belgium) Patrick Mertens	1–6, 8–9
Volvo	(Sweden) Daniel Lundh	Volvo C30	6	(Sweden) Daniel Lundh	All
Volvo	(Belgium) OTRT	Volvo C30	22	(Belgium) Filip Baelus	6–9
Volvo	(Norway) Cato Erga	Volvo C30	53	(Norway) Cato Erga	5

=== RX Lites Cup ===
Entrant	No.	Drivers	Rounds
Set Promotion	3	(Colombia) Alejandro Fernández	1, 5
Set Promotion	10	(Finland) Niclas Grönholm	3
Set Promotion	20	(Finland) Jere Kalliokoski	3
Set Promotion	79	(Sweden) Linus Leise	4
Set Promotion	22	(Belgium) Koen Pauwels	6
Set Promotion	92	(Latvia) Jānis Baumanis	7
Nelson Piquet Jr.	7	(Brazil) Nelson Piquet Jr.	2
Patrik Sandell	18	(Sweden) Patrik Sandell	5
Olsbergs MSE	11	(Sweden) Sebastian Eriksson	1–2, 7
Olsbergs MSE	24	(United States) Mitchell DeJong	2
Olsbergs MSE	51	(Sweden) Sandra Hultgren	3–4, 6–7
Olsbergs MSE	39	(Sweden) Kevin Eriksson	All
Olsbergs MSE	53	(Sweden) Richard Göransson	1–2, 4
Olsbergs MSE	17	(Canada) Antoine L'Estage	5
Olsbergs MSE	19	(Canada) Garrett Grist	5
Olsbergs MSE	16	(Sweden) Oliver Eriksson	5
Olsbergs MSE	82	(France) Julien Febreau	5
Olsbergs MSE	44	(Italy) Piero Longhi	6
Daniel Holten	13	(Norway) Daniel Holten	1–3, 6–7
Daniel Holten	31	(Norway) Asmund Holten	4
Daniel Björk	27	(Sweden) Daniel Björk	1–2
C4 Motorsports LLC	77	(United States) Austin Cindric	5
Westlund Entreprenad AB	55	(Sweden) Alexander Westlund	1–4, 6
Simon Olofsson	52	(Sweden) Simon Olofsson	3–4, 6
Toksport WRT	96	(Turkey) Yigit Timur	1–4, 6–7
Toksport WRT	40	(Turkey) Fatih Kara	6–7
Hansen Junior Team	81	(Sweden) Kevin Hansen	3–7
JC Race Teknik	99	(Poland) Aron Domzala	1
JC Race Teknik	89	(Sweden) Mikaela Åhlin-Kottulinsky	4, 7
JC Race Teknik	29	(Germany) Mark Wallenwein	6
Kenneth Tomasson	54	(Sweden) Kenneth Tomasson	4
Joachim Hvaal	9	(Norway) Joachim Hvaal	4, 6–7
Tobias Brink	71	(Sweden) Tobias Brink	4
Patrik Flodin	57	(Sweden) Patrik Flodin	4

== Results and standings ==
=== Supercar ===
Pos.	Driver	GBR (United Kingdom)	NOR (Norway)	BEL (Belgium)	GER (Germany)	ITA (Italy)	Points
1	(Sweden) Robin Larsson	1	11	1	2	2	67
2	(Norway) Henning Solberg	5	4	7	10	3	56
3	(Sweden) Pontus Tidemand		6	2	4	6	50
4	(Sweden) Peter Hedström	20	5	3	5	15	40
5	(Sweden) Emil Öhman	10	3	6	19	9	40
6	(Norway) Tommy Rustad	12	8	13	6	7	39
7	(France) Jérôme Grosset-Janin	2	15	9	9	21	33
8	(Sweden) Johan Kristoffersson			DSQ	3	1	30
9	(France) Davy Jeanney	14		4	15	8	27
10	(Sweden) Mattias Ekström		11		1		22
11	(Sweden) Lukas Walfridsson	9	7	17	14	24	21
12	(Norway) Tord Linnerud	15	9	11	17	13	20
13	(France) Alexandre Theuil	8		14	28	10	19
14	(Sweden) Edward Sandström			5		12	17
15	(United States) Ken Block		1				16
16	(Belgium) Koen Pauwels	7	21	12	16		16
17	(Norway) Daniel Holten		2				15
18	(United States) Tanner Foust	3					14
19	(United Kingdom) Andrew Jordan	4					13
19	(Sweden) Richard Göransson					4	13
21	(Norway) Frode Holte	23	14			7	13
22	(Italy) Gigi Galli					5	12
23	(France) Fabien Pailler	6					11
24	(Belgium) François Duval			8			9
24	(Sweden) Per-Gunnar Andersson				8		9
26	(Norway) Morten Bermingrud				11	14	9
27	(Poland) Krzysztof Skorupski	16	10				8
28	(Czech Republic) Pavel Koutný	11	16	16		17	8
29	(Norway) Ole Christian Veiby			10			7
30	(Sweden) Linus Westman					11	6
31	(Germany) Ronny Wechselberger				12		5
32	(Sweden) Eric Färén	13					4
32	(Norway) Ole Kristian Nøttveit		13				4
32	(Norway) Stein Egil Jenssen				13		4
35	(Belgium) Michaël De Keersmaecker			15			2
36	(Germany) René Münnich				23	16	1
Pos.	Driver	GBR (United Kingdom)	NOR (Norway)	BEL (Belgium)	GER (Germany)	ITA (Italy)	Points

=== Super1600 ===
Pos.	Driver	POR (Portugal)	GBR (United Kingdom)	NOR (Norway)	FIN (Finland)	SWE (Sweden)	BEL (Belgium)	FRA (France)	GER (Germany)	ITA (Italy)	Points
1	(Russia) Sergej Zagumennov	1	1	5	6	1	7	4	4	5	203
2	(Russia) Nikita Misyulya	2	5	8	1	3	4	2	8	1	185
3	(Latvia) Jānis Baumanis	3	17	1	2	7	1	16	1	2	171
4	(Denmark) Ulrik Linnemann	4	2	2	5	25	11	6	3	8	157
5	(Czech Republic) Ondřej Smetana	7	4	4	8	2	5	30	6	4	129
6	(Russia) Timur Shigabutdinov	5	9	6	7	15	2	8	20	13	107
7	(Estonia) Janno Ligur			10	4	5	3		10	11	85
8	(Germany) Andreas Steffen	12	8	12	12	6	9		5	10	80
9	(Russia) Rasul Minnikhanov	11	13	9	3	11	6				70
10	(Lithuania) Kasparas Navickas	8	3	7	13	4	21				69
11	(Russia) Denis Salikov	13		15			8	9	7	7	65
12	(Lithuania) Ernestas Staponkus		7	11	10	18		12	2	15	64
13	(Czech Republic) Pavel Vimmer	10	6	14	9	23	13	14	21	9	54
14	(France) Steven Bossard							1			30
15	(Norway) Espen Isaksætre			3		8					30
16	(France) Andréa Dubourg							3			23
17	(Hungary) Lajos Gyula					10			14	12	22
18	(France) Rudolf Schafer	9	12					15	16	18	21
19	(Estonia) Siim Saluri	17	16	16	11	13	19	25	12	16	21
20	(Hungary) Krisztián Szabó									3	20
21	(Austria) Christian Petrakovits		11				18	11	15		18
22	(Italy) Davide Medici							18		6	17
23	(Czech Republic) Václav Veverka	6									16
24	(France) Maximilien Eveno							7			14
25	(Norway) Oscar Solberg			18		9					12
26	(Norway) Preben Myklebust								9		12
27	(France) Evan Libner							5			11
28	(Norway) Simon Syversen					12					10
29	(Belgium) Dennis Remans						10				9
30	(France) Cyril Raymond							10			9
31	(Germany) Clemens Meyer								11		9
32	(Czech Republic) Jaroslav Vančík		10								8
33	(Belgium) Bart Stouten						12				7
34	(Norway) Glenn Haug			13		14					7
35	(France) Philippe Maloigne							13			7
36	(Czech Republic) Zdeněk Kučera	14	15								5
37	(Denmark) Peter Lindgaard					26			13		4
38	(Belgium) Davy Van Den Branden		14				20	22	22		3
39	(Italy) Silvano Ruga						14				3
40	(Hungary) Gergely Márton									14	3
41	(Portugal) António Teixeira	15									2
42	(Belgium) Danny Luyten						15				2
43	(Portugal) José Polónio	16									1
44	(Italy) Mirko Zanni					16					1
45	(Netherlands) Willem Veltman						16				1
	(Estonia) Andre Kurg				14						0
	(Germany) Mandie August					20			17	17	0
	(Belgium) Dave van Beers		18				17				0
	(Norway) Lise-Marie Sandmo			19		17					0
	(Norway) Lina Maria Holt			17		22					0
	(France) Stéphane Dréan							17			0
	(Germany) Ralph Wilhelm								18		0
	(United Kingdom) Phil Chicken		19								0
	(Norway) Marcus Bergsjøbrenden					19					0
	(France) Jimmy Terpereau							19			0
	(Denmark) Jan Petersen								19		0
	(Norway) Ada Marie Hvaal			20		21					0
	(France) Emmanuel Martin							20			0
	(France) Jean-Louis Poirier							21			0
	(France) Dominique Gerbaud							23			0
	(Netherlands) Thijs Heezen					24					0
	(France) Emmanuel Galivel							24			0
	(France) Fabien Grosset-Janin							26			0
	(France) Yvonnick Jagu							27			0
	(France) Anthony Jan							28			0
	(France) Michel Vigouroux							29			0
Pos.	Driver	POR (Portugal)	GBR (United Kingdom)	NOR (Norway)	FIN (Finland)	SWE (Sweden)	BEL (Belgium)	FRA (France)	GER (Germany)	ITA (Italy)	Points

=== TouringCar ===
Pos.	Driver	POR (Portugal)	GBR (United Kingdom)	NOR (Norway)	FIN (Finland)	SWE (Sweden)	BEL (Belgium)	FRA (France)	GER (Germany)	ITA (Italy)	Points
1	(Sweden) Daniel Lundh	6	1	2	1	7	8	2	6	4	189
2	(Norway) Torleif Lona	1	6	9	3	10	3	7	2	3	170
3	(Norway) Anders Bråten	3	2	16	5	11	2	3	3	1	167
4	(Norway) Kjetil Larsen	2	7	8	7	12	5	6	7	7	154
5	(Norway) Fredrik Salsten	7	10	3	8	2	4	9			91
6	(Norway) David Nordgård		4	10		9		1	8		84
7	(Belgium) Filip Baelus						1	4	5	2	82
8	(Norway) Kjetil Tangen			5	9	22	7	8	9	8	78
9	(Norway) Tom Daniel Tånevik		3	1		1					74
10	(Norway) Per Magne Røyrås		8	13		3				5	65
11	(Belgium) Patrick Mertens	4	9	14	11	23	9		10	6	63
12	(Norway) Ben-Philip Gundersen			4		8			4		50
13	(Netherlands) Mandy Kasse		5				10	5			40
14	(Norway) Camilla Antonsen			12		19			1		39
15	(Norway) Christian Sandmo			6		4					34
16	(Finland) Pekka Mustakallio				4	5					30
17	(Finland) Jari Järvenpää				2	14					28
18	(Norway) Atle Vik			7							16
19	(Belgium) Nick Snoeys						6				14
20	(Portugal) José Fábrica	5									12
21	(Norway) Fredrik Magnussen			11		17					12
22	(Finland) Tomi Koirikivi				6						11
23	(Norway) Cato Erga					6					11
24	(Estonia) Ruve Veski				10	18					10
25	(Sweden) Roger Enlund					13					4
26	(Norway) Robert Aamodt			15		15					2
27	(Norway) Ernst Holten Leifsen					16					1
	(Sweden) Philip Gehrman					20					0
	(Norway) Hans Børge Ovesen					21					0
Pos.	Driver	POR (Portugal)	GBR (United Kingdom)	NOR (Norway)	FIN (Finland)	SWE (Sweden)	BEL (Belgium)	FRA (France)	GER (Germany)	ITA (Italy)	Points

=== RX Lites ===
Pos.	Driver	POR (Portugal)	GBR (United Kingdom)	FIN (Finland)	SWE (Sweden)	ITA (Italy)	TUR (Turkey)	Points
1	(Sweden) Kevin Eriksson	2	4	4	1	2	4	136
2	(Sweden) Kevin Hansen			1	2	3	2	99
3	(Norway) Daniel Holten	5	8	7		1	5	97
4	(Turkey) Yigit Timur	4	7	2	14	5	6	94
5	(Sweden) Sebastian Eriksson	1	5				1	82
6	(Sweden) Richard Göransson	3	2		3			73
7	(Sweden) Alexander Westlund	6	9	5	12	12		71
9	(Sweden) Daniel Björk	8	3					33
13	(United States) Mitchell DeJong		1					29
20	(Brazil) Nelson Piquet Jr.		6					18
21	(Poland) Aron Domzala	7						14
23	(Colombia) Alejo Fernandez	9						12
Pos.	Driver	POR (Portugal)	GBR (United Kingdom)	FIN (Finland)	SWE (Sweden)	ITA (Italy)	TUR (Turkey)	Points
