= François Duval =

Belgian rally driver (born 1980)

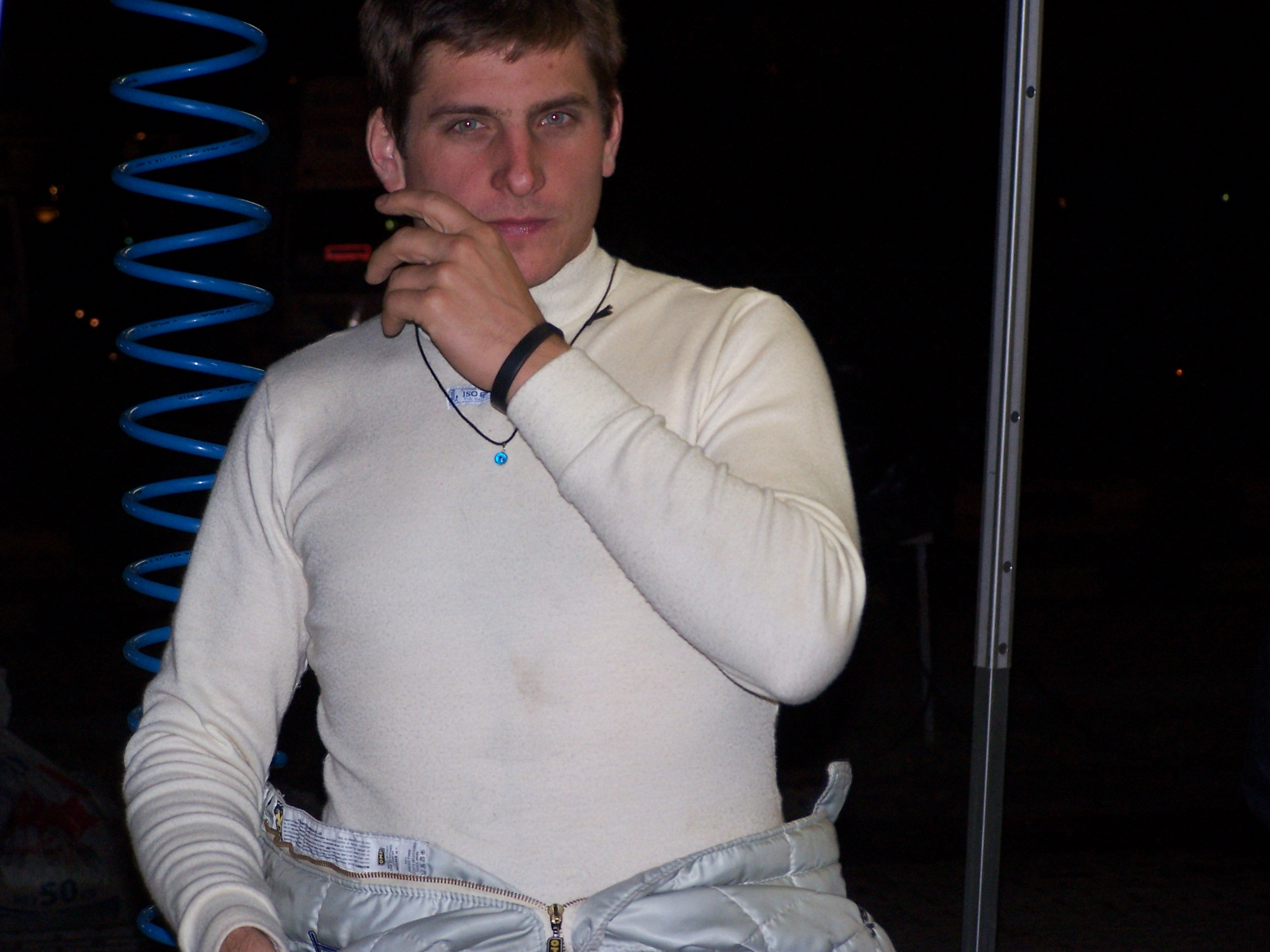
- François Duval at the 2006 Rally of Turkey.

Personal information
- Nationality: (Belgium) Belgian
- Full name: François Jean-Claude Ghislain Duval
- Born: 18 November 1980 (age 45); Ostend, Belgium

World Rally Championship record
- Years active: 2001–2008, 2010
- Co-driver: (Belgium) Jean-Marc Fortin (Belgium) Stéphane Prévot (Belgium) Philippe Droeven (Belgium) Sven Smeets (France) Patrick Pivato (Belgium) Jean-François Elst (Belgium) Eddy Chevallier (France) Denis Giraudet
- Teams: Ford, Citroën, Škoda, Stobart
- Rallies: 84
- Championships: 0
- Rally wins: 1
- Podiums: 14
- Stage wins: 55
- Total points: 172
- First rally: 2001 Rallye de Portugal
- First win: 2005 Rally Australia
- Last win: 2005 Rally Australia
- Last rally: 2010 Rallye Deutschland

FIA World Rallycross Championship
- Years active: 2014–2019
- Former teams: Ecurie Bayard ASBL; Marklund Motorsport; Albatec Racing; DA Racing; Comtoyou Racing; ES Motorsport-Labas GAS
- Starts: 7
- Wins: 0
- Podiums: 0
- Best finish: 19th in 2016
- Finished last season: 31st

FIA European Rallycross Championship
- Years active: 2009–2012, 2014–2015
- Former teams: Ecurie Bayard ASBL; Marklund Motorsport
- Starts: 7
- Wins: 1
- Podiums: 1
- Best finish: 12th in 2010 (Division 1)

François Jean-Claude Ghislain Duval (born 18 November 1980) is a Belgian rally driver.

== Career ==
=== 1999–2004 ===
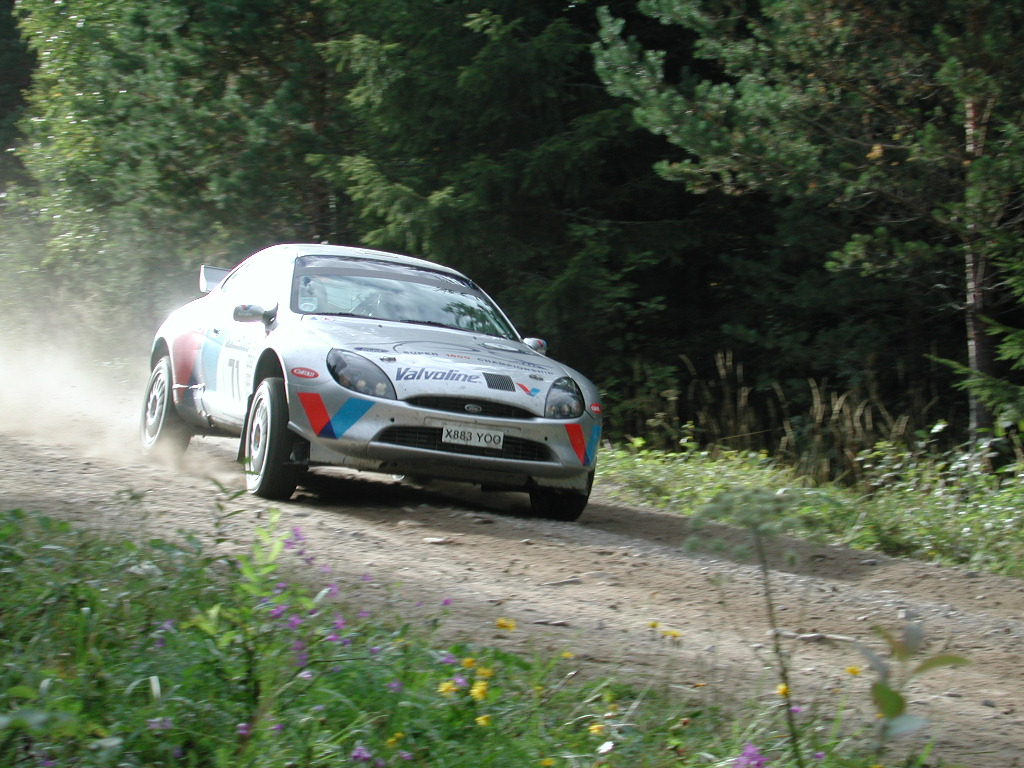
Duval in a Ford Puma at the 2001 Rally Finland

Duval is the son of former rally driver Rene Duval. With victories in four events Duval won the Belgian Citroën Saxo Challenge title in 1999. He began his career as a rally driver at the international level; first, as a driver in the inaugural season of the lower-rung Super 1600 category of the World Rally Championship and later in the Junior World Rally Championship aboard a Ford Puma in 2001, the same year in which Saxo driver and future Citroën teammate Sébastien Loeb won the title. Beginning with the 2002 season, he progressed to become a regular driver of a Ford Focus RS WRC with the factory M-Sport-ran Ford World Rally Team. Concurrent with his World Rally Car exploits, he added a second campaign with the Puma in the junior series, taking a category win on the Monte Carlo Rally.

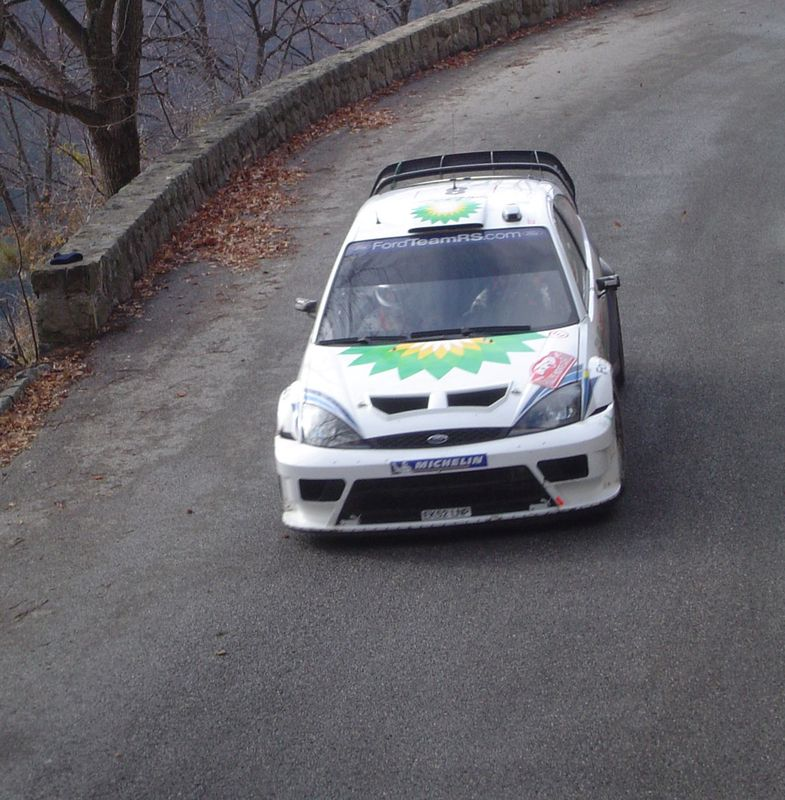
Duval-Prevot 2004 Monte-Carlo

For the 2003 season, Duval found himself promoted to the role of regular Ford points-scorer in the manufacturers' championship, alongside Estonian youngster Markko Märtin after the double departure from the team of both Colin McRae and Carlos Sainz. He made a points-scoring debut on that year's Monte Carlo Rally, and as predicted by team boss Malcolm Wilson, collected his first world rally podium in Turkey later in the year. He retained his role alongside Märtin heading into the 2004 season, backing up the Estonian de facto team leader in a 1–2 early season surprise win on the first World Series running of the Rally Mexico. However, amidst increasing uncertainty as to Ford's participation in future championship seasons, both he and Martin were released from their contracts at the end of the season.

=== 2005–2008 ===
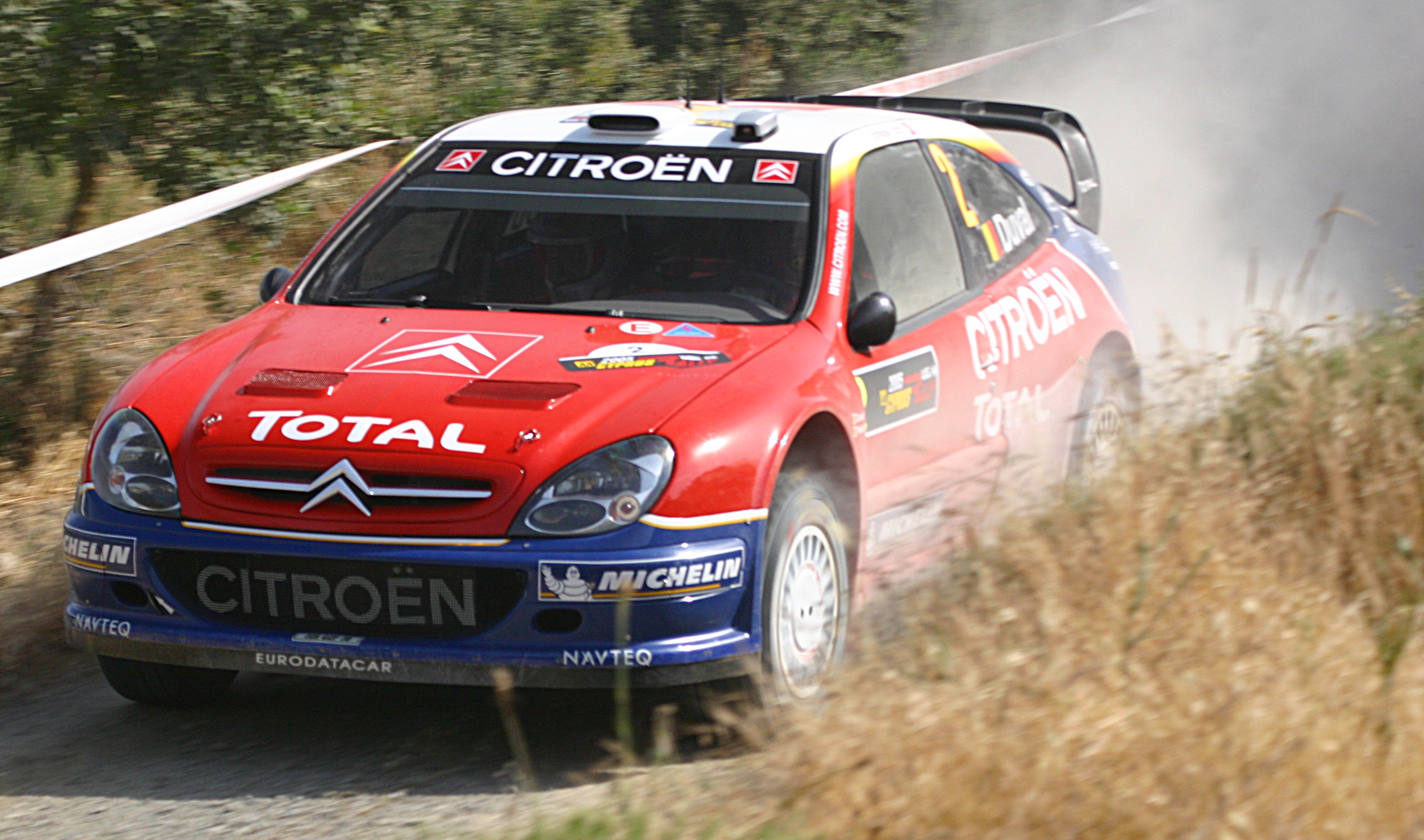
Duval at the 2005 Cyprus Rally.

Duval moved to reigning world champion manufacturers Citroën for the 2005 and a chance to partner recently crowned World Champion Sébastien Loeb and to drive the Xsara WRC. Unfortunately for Duval, this new partnership arrangement got off to an inauspicious start. A series of costly shunts, including on his Citroën debut from second place in Monte Carlo, led to an enforced two-rally leave from the cockpit for the Turkey and Acropolis rallies. Ironically Duval was replaced by the Belgian's idol, double world champion, and immediate Citroën predecessor, Carlos Sainz. By late 2005, however, the Belgian appeared to be recovering his verve. After an initially tentative return, he was to storm to second place in the Rally Deutschland barred from victory only by the all-conquering Loeb. He added a fine second-place finish on the Wales Rally GB, somewhat ill-starred by the fatal accident that befell erstwhile Ford teammate Markko Martin's navigator, Michael Park. Then, at the 2005 Telstra Rally Australia, on the backdrop of the exits of podium challengers Loeb, Petter Solberg, Marcus Grönholm and one-off Škoda entrant Colin McRae over the course of the three legs of the event, Duval won his first World Rally Championship event, ahead of Harri Rovanperä and Manfred Stohl.

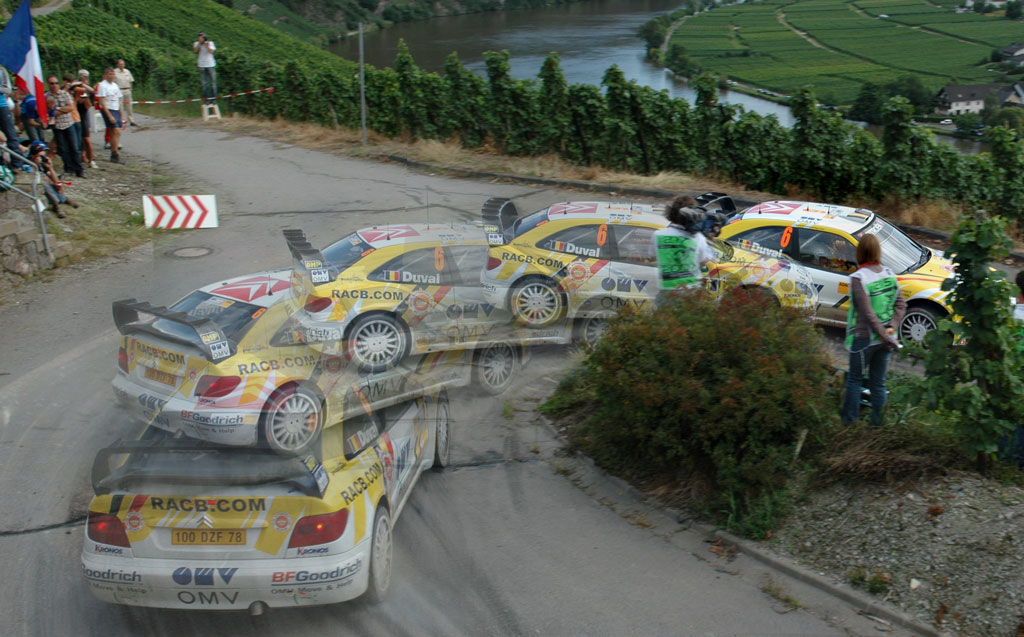
Duval at the 2007 Rallye Deutschland.

The immediate forecast for the Belgian's future remained clouded, however, with Citroën taking a one-year formal sabbatical from the series. Although 2005 teammate and now two-time champion Sébastien Loeb could revel in the luxury of a contract with the privateer Kronos outfit for all of the 2006 season's world rallies, as well as a testing package within the rejuvenated factory-backed Citroën C4 WRC, Duval proved unable to maintain a link to either organisation. Sporadic stints in a privately run Škoda Fabia WRC formed the platform of his eventual world championship campaign, with a best finish of sixth in the Rally Catalunya in Spain. Only two other top ten finishes were achieved all year, namely on the Italian and Turkish rounds, notwithstanding a late-season triumph in the same apparatus on his native non-world championship Condroz Rally in November.

Despite outstanding funding woes forcing him to abort a proposed campaign with the Fabia for the 2007 season, Duval's continued presence in the world series was ensured with a deal to drive a Kronos run Citroën Xsara WRC later in the season. He subsequently finished a close second to the Citroën C4-mounted defending title-holder, Loeb on the 2007 Rallye Deutschland that August. The result marked his first podium since his one and, thus far only, World Rally victory.

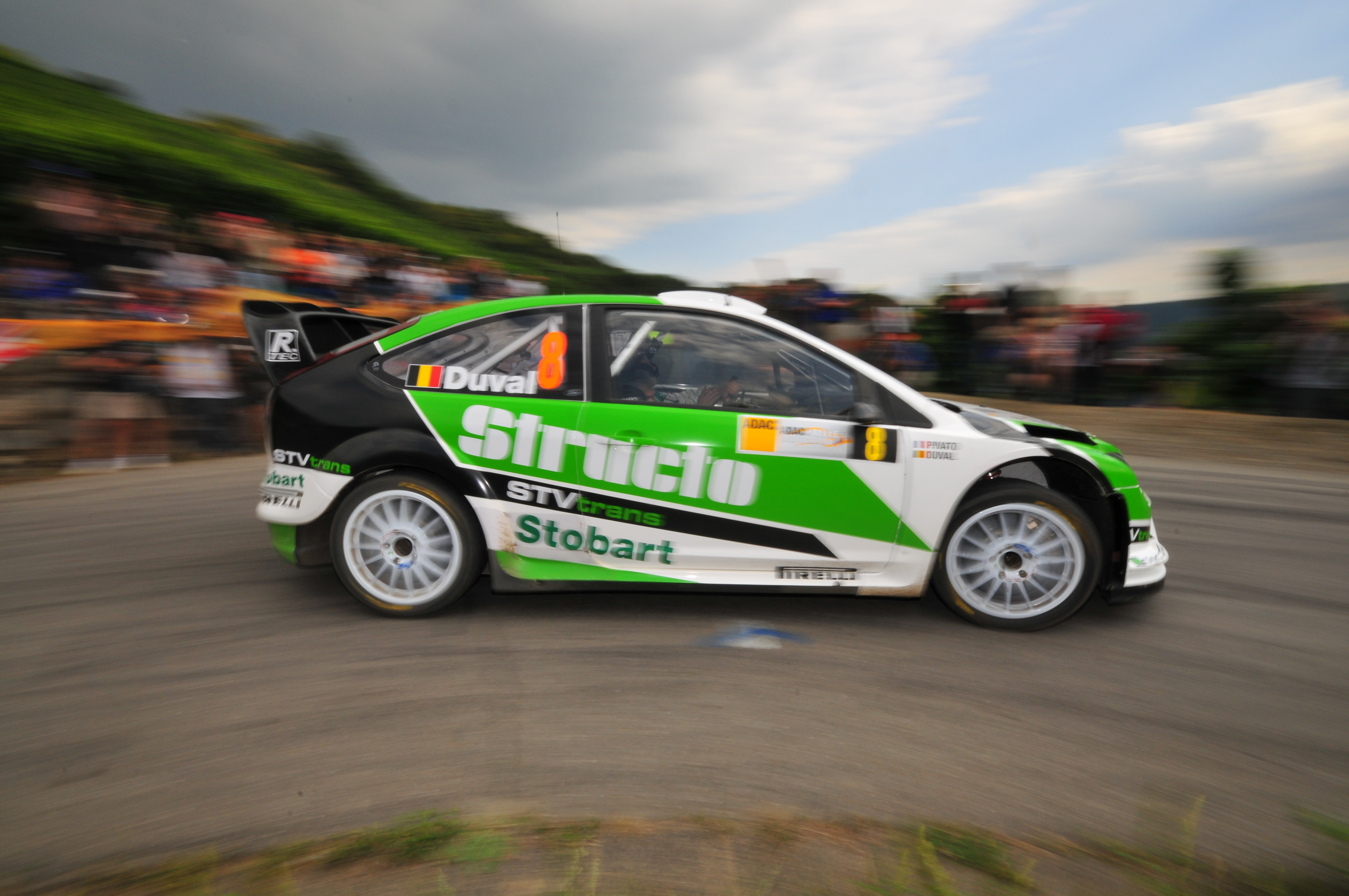
Duval at the 2008 Rallye Deutschland.

In the 2008 season opener, the 2008 Monte Carlo Rally, Duval competed in a Ford Focus RS WRC 07 for Stobart VK M-Sport Ford. After a tight battle for third place with Subaru's Chris Atkinson, Duval finished fourth, only 1.1 seconds behind Atkinson. He returned to Stobart Ford for the next tarmac rally, the 2008 Rallye Deutschland, and beat Ford factory team driver Mikko Hirvonen in the battle for the third place. After Stobart's Gigi Galli was injured in a crash at the event, Duval was signed by Ford as Galli's replacement also for the gravel events. For tarmac events, Ford promoted Duval to the factory team. In New Zealand, he crashed out from fifth place during the penultimate stage, but went on to continue his strong performances on tarmac, finishing fourth at the Rally Catalunya and third at the Tour de Corse.

During the 2008 season, Duval was performing on the Japanese circuit. On stage 6 of the first day, he went off the road and crashed into a concrete barrier, seriously injuring his co-pilot, Patrick Pivato. Pivato suffered both a fractured pelvis and a fractured leg as a result of the accident.

Duval announced his retirement from contemporary rallying, in March 2010. However, he changed his mind to compete in Rally Deutschland the same year in a Stobart Ford. He crashed during SS14 Arena Panzerplatte 2 and retired from fifth position.

In 2015, Duval was sentenced to four months in prison for his involvement in a car insurance fraud scheme.

== WRC victories ==
#	Event	Season	Co-driver	Car
1	18th Telstra Rally Australia	2005	(Belgium) Sven Smeets	Citroën Xsara WRC

== Racing record ==
=== Complete WRC results ===
Year	Entrant	Car	1	2	3	4	5	6	7	8	9	10	11	12	13	14	15	16	WDC	Points
2001	François Duval	Mitsubishi Carisma GT	MON	SWE	POR; Ret			CYP; Ret							AUS; 19				–	0
2001	François Duval	Ford Puma S1600				ESP; Ret	ARG		GRE; DSQ	KEN	FIN; Ret	NZL	ITA; 18	FRA; Ret		GBR; Ret			–	0
2002	François Duval	Ford Puma S1600	MON; 17			ESP; 25			GRE; Ret	KEN		GER; Ret	ITA; 20	NZL		GBR; Ret			–	0
2002	François Duval	Ford Focus RS WRC 01		SWE; 10	FRA; Ret														–	0
2002	Ford Motor Co	Ford Focus RS WRC 02					CYP; Ret	ARG			FIN; Ret				AUS; Ret				–	0
2003	Castrol Ford Rally Team	Ford Focus RS WRC 02	MON; 7	SWE; Ret	TUR; 3														9th	30
2003	Castrol Ford Rally Team	Ford Focus RS WRC 03				NZL; 9	ARG; 8	GRE; Ret	CYP; Ret	GER; 7	FIN; Ret	AUS; 10	ITA; 5	FRA; 3	ESP; 4	GBR; 5			9th	30
2004	BP Castrol Ford Rally Team	Ford Focus RS WRC 03	MON; 3	SWE; Ret	MEX; 2														6th	53
2004	BP Castrol Ford Rally Team	Ford Focus RS WRC 04				NZL; 18	CYP; Ret	GRE; 4	TUR; 5	ARG; 3	FIN; 7	GER; 2	JPN; Ret	GBR; 5	ITA; 5	FRA; Ret	ESP; Ret	AUS; 3	6th	53
2005	Citroën Sport Total	Citroën Xsara WRC	MON; Ret	SWE; 12	MEX; Ret	NZL; 4	ITA; 11	CYP; Ret	TUR	GRE	ARG; 7	FIN; 8	GER; 2	GBR; 2	JPN; 4	FRA; Ret	ESP; 2	AUS; 1	6th	47
2006	First Motorsport	Škoda Fabia WRC	MON; Ret	SWE	MEX	ESP; 6	FRA; Ret	ARG	ITA; 8	GRE; 13	GER; Ret	FIN	JPN	CYP	TUR; 9	AUS	NZL	GBR; 8	19th	5
2007	First Motorsport	Škoda Fabia WRC	MON	SWE	NOR	MEX	POR	ARG	ITA	GRE; Ret	FIN								10th	12
2007	OMV Kronos Citroën WRT	Citroën Xsara WRC										GER; 2	NZL	ESP; 5	FRA; Ret	JPN	IRE	GBR	10th	12
2008	Stobart VK M-Sport Ford Rally Team	Ford Focus RS WRC 07	MON; 4	SWE	MEX	ARG	JOR	ITA	GRE	TUR	FIN	GER; 3	NZL; Ret			JPN; Ret	GBR; 6		7th	25
2008	BP Ford Abu Dhabi World Rally Team	Ford Focus RS WRC 08												ESP; 4	FRA; 3				7th	25
2010	Stobart M-Sport Ford Rally Team	Ford Focus RS WRC 08	SWE	MEX	JOR	TUR	NZL	POR	BUL	FIN	GER; Ret	JPN	FRA	ESP	GBR				NC	0

=== Complete JWRC results ===
Year	Entrant	Car	1	2	3	4	5	6	JWRC	Points
2001	François Duval	Ford Puma S1600	ESP; Ret	GRE; Ret	FIN; Ret	ITA; 2	FRA; Ret	GBR; Ret	7th	6
2002	François Duval	Ford Puma S1600	MON; 1	ESP; 6	GRE; Ret	GER; Ret	ITA; 6	GBR; Ret	6th	12

=== Complete Intercontinental Rally Challenge results ===
Year	Entrant	Car	1	2	3	4	5	6	7	8	9	10	11	IRC	Points
2008	Francois Duval	Fiat Abarth Grande Punto S2000	TUR	POR; Ret	BEL	RUS	POR	CZE	ESP	ITA	SWI	CHI		NC	0
2009	Francois Duval	Skoda Fabia S2000	MON	BRA	KEN	POR	BEL; Ret	RUS	POR	CZE	ESP	ITA	SCO	NC	0
2009	Abarth & Co. SpA	Fiat Abarth Grande Punto S2000	MON	BRA	KEN	POR	BEL	RUS	POR	CZE	ESP	ITA; Ret	SCO	NC	0

=== Complete FIA European Rallycross Championship results ===
(key)

==== Division 1 ====
Year	Entrant	Car	1	2	3	4	5	6	7	8	9	10	ERX	Points
2009	François Duval	Ford Focus	GBR	POR	FRA	HUN	AUT	SWE	BEL; 7	GER	POL	CZE	24th	10
2010	François Duval	Ford Focus	POR	FRA	GBR; 4	HUN	SWE	FIN	BEL; 1	GER	POL	CZE	12th	33

==== Supercar ====
Year	Entrant	Car	1	2	3	4	5	6	7	8	9	10	ERX	Points
2011	François Duval	Peugeot 207	GBR	POR	FRA	NOR	SWE	BEL; 15	NED	AUT	POL	CZE	36th	2
2012	François Duval	Peugeot 207	GBR	FRA	AUT	HUN	NOR	SWE	BEL; 12	NED	FIN	GER	42nd	5
2014	Marklund Motorsport	Volkswagen Polo	GBR	NOR	BEL; 8	GER	ITA						24th	9
2015	Ecurie Bayard ASBL	Ford Focus	BEL; 6	GER	NOR	BAR	ITA						17th	21

=== Complete FIA World Rallycross Championship results ===
(key)

==== Supercar ====
Year	Entrant	Car	1	2	3	4	5	6	7	8	9	10	11	12	13	WRX	Points
2014	Marklund Motorsport	Volkswagen Polo	POR	GBR	NOR	FIN	SWE	BEL; 16	CAN	FRA	GER	ITA	TUR	ARG		55th	1
2015	Ecurie Bayard ASBL	Peugeot 208	POR	HOC	BEL	GBR	GER	SWE	CAN	NOR	FRA; 31	BAR	TUR	ITA	ARG	NC	0
2016	Ecurie Bayard ASBL	Ford Fiesta	POR	HOC	BEL; 5	GBR	NOR	SWE	CAN	FRA	BAR	LAT	GER	ARG		19th	18
2017	Albatec Racing	Peugeot 208	BAR	POR	HOC	BEL; 15	GBR	NOR	SWE	CAN	FRA					22nd	2
2017	DA Racing	Peugeot 208										LAT; 20	GER	RSA		22nd	2
2018	Comtoyou Racing	Audi S1	BAR	POR	BEL; 13	GBR	NOR	SWE	CAN	FRA	LAT	USA	GER	RSA		21st	4
2019	ES Motorsport-Labas GAS	Škoda Fabia	UAE	ESP	BEL; 17	GBR	NOR	SWE	CAN	FRA	LAT	RSA				31st	0
