= Magda Andersson =

Swedish racing driver

- Nationality: Swedish
- Born: Magda Anna Linnéa Andersson; 14 July 1998 (age 28) Hörby, Skåne, Sweden
- Relatives: Klara Andersson (sister)

FIA ERX Supercar Championship career
- Debut season: 2017
- Car number: 19
- Former teams: Marklund Motorsport, DA Racing
- Starts: 9
- Wins: 0
- Podiums: 0
- Best finish: 16th in 2017
- Finished last season: 31st

FIA ERX TouringCar Championship
- Years active: 2015–2016
- Former teams: Valvoline RX Team
- Starts: 10
- Wins: 1
- Podiums: 6
- Best finish: 2nd in 2016

Magda Anna Linnéa Andersson (born 14 July 1998) is a former racing driver from Sweden who primarily competed in the FIA European Rallycross Championship.

== Biography ==
Following multiple competitive seasons in domestic junior rallycross events, Andersson began competing professionally in the European rear-wheel drive "Touring Car" class in 2015. In 2016 she became the first woman to win a European rallycross final in Belgium and ultimately finished second in the championship, one point behind Ben-Philip Gundersen.

In 2017, Andersson stepped up to the "Supercars" category with Marklund Motorsport, qualifying for the semi-finals on two occasions and finishing 16th in the standings whilst her more experienced team-mate Anton Marklund won the title. She moved to DA Racing for 2018, but finished the season on negative points following a technical infringement at Höljes.

At the end of 2018, Andersson sacrificed her career for her sister Klara, who did not have the budget to race otherwise. Andersson has since completed a law degree at Lund University and has beaten ovarian cancer.

Her father Håkan formerly competed in the Swedish Rallycross Championship for Volvo and BMW.

== Results ==
=== Career summary ===
Season	Series	Position	Team	Car
2012	European Junior Rallycross Cup	2nd	Magda Motors	JRX – Mercedes-Benz A-Class
2013	JRX International Series	3rd	Magda Motors/Swedish Junior Rallycross Team	JRX – Mercedes-Benz A-Class
2014	Swedish Super Cup	2nd	Magda Motors/SMK Hörby	BMW M3 (E30)
2015	FIA European Rallycross Championship – TouringCar	4th	Magda Motors	Ford Fiesta Mk.6
2016	FIA European Rallycross Championship – TouringCar	2nd	Magda Motors	Ford Fiesta Mk.6
2017	FIA European Rallycross Championship – SuperCar	16th	Marklund Motorsport	Volkswagen Polo Mk.5
2018	FIA European Rallycross Championship – SuperCar	31st	Dubourg Auto	Peugeot 208 Mk.1

=== Complete FIA European Rallycross Championship results ===
==== TouringCar ====
Year	Entrant	Car	1	2	3	4	5	ERX	Points
2015	Magda Motors	Ford Fiesta RWD	BEL; 12	GBR; 5	GER; 2	SWE; 3	NOR; 8	4th	81
2016	Magda Motors	Ford Fiesta RWD	BEL; 1	NOR; 11	SWE; 2	LAT; 2	GER; 2	2nd	106

==== Supercar ====
Year	Entrant	Car	1	2	3	4	5	ERX	Points
2017	Marklund Motorsport	Volkswagen Polo	BAR; 28	NOR; 15	SWE; 12	FRA; 9	LAT; 19	16th	19
2018	Dubourg Auto	Peugeot 208	BAR	BEL; 15	SWE; 18	FRA; 8	LAT; 22	31st	-15
