= Nikita Misyulya =

Russian racing driver

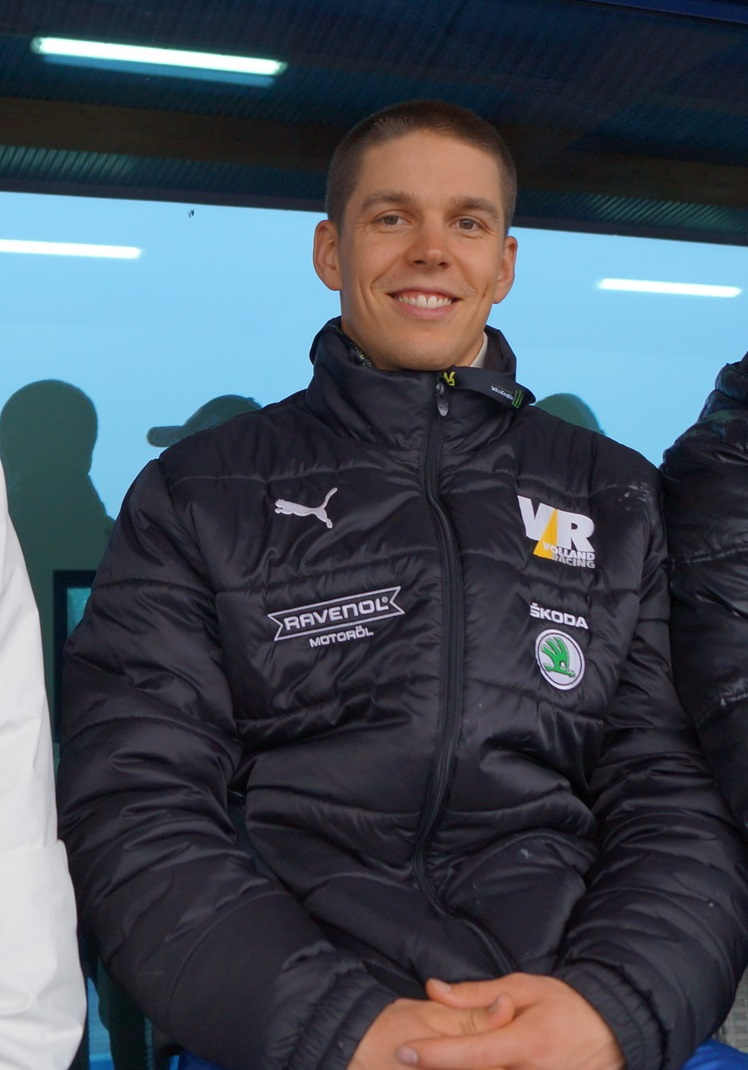
- Nationality: Russian
- Born: Nikita Pavlovich Misyulya; 23 April 1990 (age 36) Kaunas, Lithuania

Previous series
- 2014 2014-2015 2013: WTCC; FIA ERX; LADA Granta Cup

Championship titles
- 2013: LADA Granta Cup

Nikita Pavlovich Misyulya (Russian: Ники́та Па́влович Мисю́ля) (born 23 April 1990) is a Russian racing driver previously competing in the World Touring Car Championship and FIA European Rallycross Championship, he made his debut in both championships in 2014.

== Racing career ==
Misyulya began his career in 2013 in the LADA Granta Cup, winning the championship that year. In 2014, Misyulya made his World Touring Car Championship debut with Campos Racing driving a SEAT León WTCC in the Russian round of the championship. He also raced in the FIA European Rallycross Championship that year for Volland Racing, finishing second in the standings.

Misyulya's racing licence was revoked by Russian Automobile Federation for the 2017 season for multiple traffic violations.

== Racing record ==
=== Complete FIA European Rallycross Championship results ===
==== Super1600 ====
Year	Entrant	Car	1	2	3	4	5	6	7	8	9	ERX	Points
2014	Volland Racing	Škoda Fabia	POR; 2	GBR; 5	NOR; 8	FIN; 1	SWE; 3	BEL; 4	FRA; 2	GER; 8	ITA; 1	2nd	185
2015	Volland Racing	Škoda Fabia	POR; 6	BEL; 2	GER; 11	SWE; 2	FRA; 11	BAR; 4	ITA; 4			4th	120

=== Complete World Touring Car Championship results ===
(key) (Races in bold indicate pole position – 1 point awarded just in first race; races in italics indicate fastest lap – 1 point awarded all races; * signifies that driver led race for at least one lap – 1 point given all races)

Year	Team	Car	1	2	3	4	5	6	7	8	9	10	11	12	13	14	15	16	17	18	19	20	21	22	23	24	DC	Pts
2014	Campos Racing	SEAT León WTCC	MAR; 1	MAR; 2	FRA; 1	FRA; 2	HUN; 1	HUN; 2	SVK; 1	SVK; 2	AUT; 1	AUT; 2	RUS; 1 Ret	RUS; 2; 16	BEL; 1	BEL; 2	ARG; 1	ARG; 2	CHN1; 1	CHN1; 2	CHN2; 1	CHN2; 2	JPN; 1	JPN; 2	MAC; 1	MAC; 2	NC	0
