= Koen Pauwels =

Koen Hendrik Pauwels is a Belgian-American professor and author. He is a Distinguished Professor of Marketing and Associate Dean of Research at Northeastern University's D'Amore McKim School of Business.

== Education and career ==
Pauwels studied at St Joseph College, Turnhout and later pursued Commercial Engineering at the university level, completing internships in Germany and Ireland, where he first encountered marketing. After beginning a Ph.D. in Belgium, Pauwels transferred to UCLA in 1997, earning his Ph.D. in 2001. He joined Dartmouth’s Tuck School of Business as an assistant professor, achieving tenure in 2005.

Through a Marie-Curie Reintegration Grant, he authored It's Not the Size of the Data – It's How You Use It in 2013. Pauwels joined Northeastern University in Boston in 2017, becoming a Distinguished Professor the following year. He holds a visiting role at Groningen University, His academic service includes the presidency of the American Marketing Association Academic Council (2021–2022) and Vice Presidency of Practice at INFORMS (2018–2022).

He is an Editor-in-Chief of the International Journal of Research in Marketing and serves on the boards of the Journal of Retailing, Marketing Letters, and the Journal of Interactive Marketing.

In 2023, Pauwels was included in Stanford University's database of the top 2% of scientists globally.
