= Ole Kristian Temte =

Norwegian racing driver

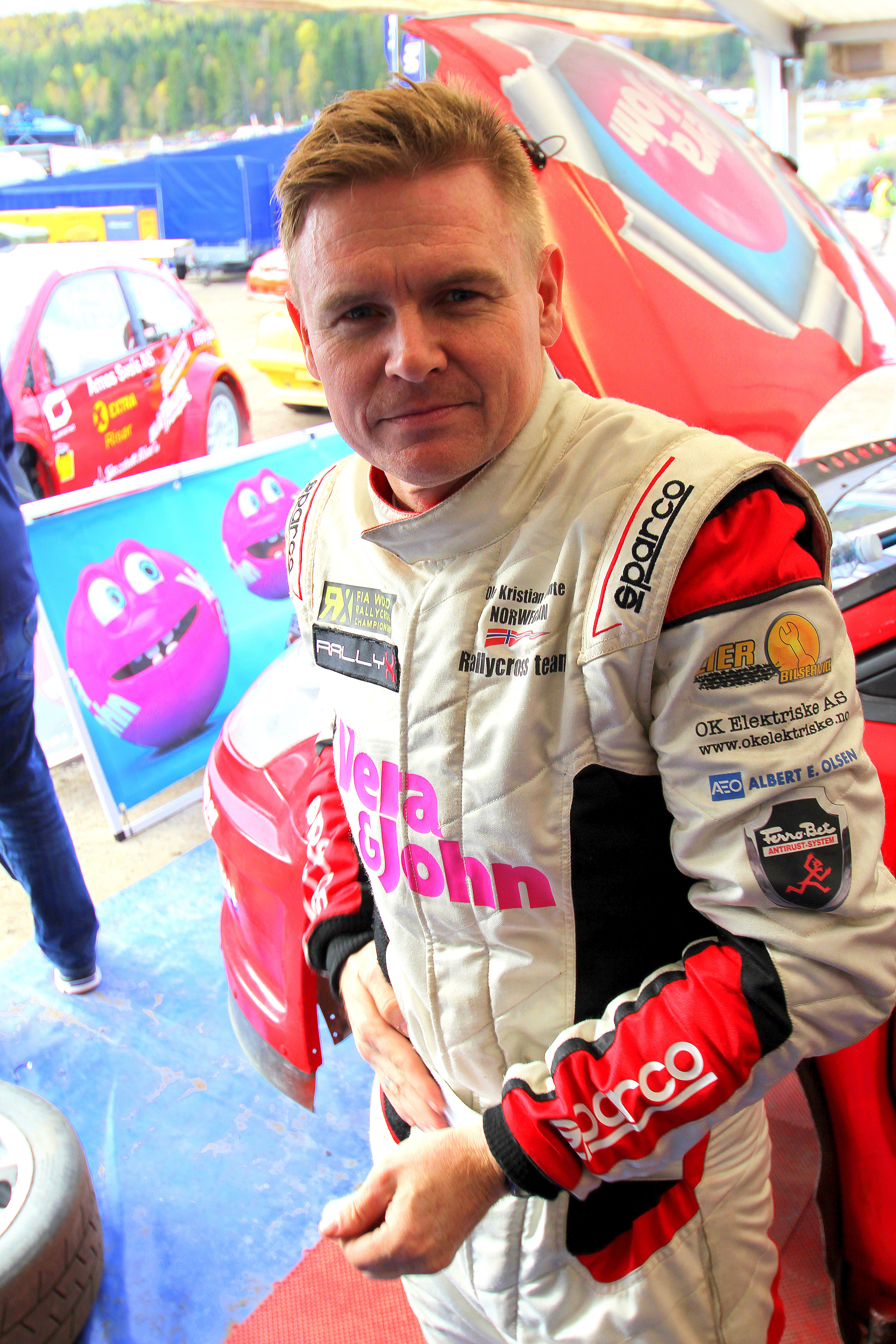
- Nationality: (Norway) Norwegian
- Born: 23 September 1975 (age 51) Krokstadelva, Norway
- Debut season: 2015
- Current team: Ole Kristian Temte Norwegian Rallycross Team / OK Motorsport
- Car number: 30
- Spotter: Anne Louise Krokdal
- Starts: 93
- Wins: 6
- Podiums: 21
- Best finish: 3rd Norwegian Championship in 2018

Ole Kristian Temte (born 23 September 1975) is a rallycross driver from Krokstadelva, Norway. His racing career started in 2009, and he switched to supercars in 2015. He has competed in the RallyX Nordic Championship, the FIA World Rallycross Championship, and the European Rallycross Championship. Temte was a permanent driver in the European Rallycross Championship 2017.

== History ==
KNA-Eiker introduced rallycross to Temte in 2008 by asking him to drive in a race. He bought his first rallycross car, a Volvo 240.

In 2010, a big crash almost ended his career during a race at Lyngås. Temte was out from racing for 11 months, and suffered a permanent damage to his left arm.

Temte has driven a Citroën C4 for supercars since 2015.
