= 1990 480 km of Monza =

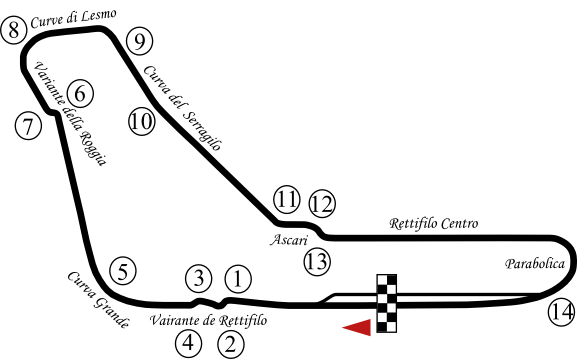
Layout of the Autodromo Nazionale di Monza (1976-1993)

The 1990 480 km of Monza was the second round of the 1990 World Sportscar Championship season, taking place at Autodromo Nazionale Monza, Italy. It took place on April 29, 1990.

== Official results ==
Class winners in bold. Cars failing to complete 75% of the winner's distance marked as Not Classified (NC).

Pos	Class	No	Team	Drivers	Chassis	Tyre	Laps
Pos	Class	No	Team	Drivers	Engine	Tyre	Laps
1	**C**	**1**	**(Germany) Team Sauber Mercedes**	**(Italy) Mauro Baldi (France) Jean-Louis Schlesser**	**Mercedes-Benz C11**	G	**83**
1	**C**	**1**	**(Germany) Team Sauber Mercedes**	**(Italy) Mauro Baldi (France) Jean-Louis Schlesser**	**Mercedes-Benz M119 5.0L Turbo V8**	G	**83**
2	C	2	(Germany) Team Sauber Mercedes	(Germany) Jochen Mass (Austria) Karl Wendlinger	Mercedes-Benz C11	G	83
2	C	2	(Germany) Team Sauber Mercedes	(Germany) Jochen Mass (Austria) Karl Wendlinger	Mercedes-Benz M119 5.0L Turbo V8	G	83
3	C	3	(United Kingdom) Silk Cut Jaguar	(United Kingdom) Martin Brundle (France) Alain Ferté	Jaguar XJR-11	G	83
3	C	3	(United Kingdom) Silk Cut Jaguar	(United Kingdom) Martin Brundle (France) Alain Ferté	Jaguar JV6 3.5L Turbo V6	G	83
4	C	4	(United Kingdom) Silk Cut Jaguar	(Netherlands) Jan Lammers (United Kingdom) Andy Wallace	Jaguar XJR-11	G	82
4	C	4	(United Kingdom) Silk Cut Jaguar	(Netherlands) Jan Lammers (United Kingdom) Andy Wallace	Jaguar JV6 3.5L Turbo V6	G	82
5	C	7	(Germany) Joest Porsche Racing	(Germany) Frank Jelinski (France) Bob Wollek	Porsche 962C	MI	82
5	C	7	(Germany) Joest Porsche Racing	(Germany) Frank Jelinski (France) Bob Wollek	Porsche Type-935 3.2L Turbo Flat-6	MI	82
6	C	22	(United Kingdom) Spice Engineering	(South Africa) Wayne Taylor (Belgium) Eric van de Poele	Spice SE90C	G	81
6	C	22	(United Kingdom) Spice Engineering	(South Africa) Wayne Taylor (Belgium) Eric van de Poele	Ford Cosworth DFR 3.5L V8	G	81
7	C	23	(Japan) Nissan Motorsports International	(United Kingdom) Julian Bailey (United Kingdom) Kenny Acheson	Nissan R90CK	D	81
7	C	23	(Japan) Nissan Motorsports International	(United Kingdom) Julian Bailey (United Kingdom) Kenny Acheson	Nissan VRH35Z 3.5L Turbo V8	D	81
8	C	8	(Germany) Joest Porsche Racing	(United Kingdom) Jonathan Palmer (United Kingdom) Tiff Needell	Porsche 962C	MI	81
8	C	8	(Germany) Joest Porsche Racing	(United Kingdom) Jonathan Palmer (United Kingdom) Tiff Needell	Porsche Type-935 3.2L Turbo Flat-6	MI	81
9	C	10	(Germany) Porsche Kremer Racing	(Germany) Bernd Schneider (South Africa) Sarel van der Merwe	Porsche 962CK6	Y	80
9	C	10	(Germany) Porsche Kremer Racing	(Germany) Bernd Schneider (South Africa) Sarel van der Merwe	Porsche Type-935 3.0L Turbo Flat-6	Y	80
10	C	11	(Germany) Porsche Kremer Racing (United Kingdom) Convector	(United Kingdom) Anthony Reid (Sweden) Anders Olofsson	Porsche 962CK6	Y	79
10	C	11	(Germany) Porsche Kremer Racing (United Kingdom) Convector	(United Kingdom) Anthony Reid (Sweden) Anders Olofsson	Porsche Type-935 3.0L Turbo Flat-6	Y	79
11	C	21	(United Kingdom) Spice Engineering	(Spain) Fermín Vélez (Mexico) Bernard Jourdain	Spice SE90C	G	79
11	C	21	(United Kingdom) Spice Engineering	(Spain) Fermín Vélez (Mexico) Bernard Jourdain	Ford Cosworth DFR 3.5L V8	G	79
12	C	17	(Switzerland) Brun Motorsport	(Italy) Massimo Sigala (Sweden) Eje Elgh	Porsche 962C	Y	79
12	C	17	(Switzerland) Brun Motorsport	(Italy) Massimo Sigala (Sweden) Eje Elgh	Porsche Type-935 3.0L Turbo Flat-6	Y	79
13	C	13	(France) Courage Compétition	(France) Pascal Fabre (Italy) Beppe Gabbiani	Cougar C24S	G	79
13	C	13	(France) Courage Compétition	(France) Pascal Fabre (Italy) Beppe Gabbiani	Porsche Type-935 3.0L Turbo Flat-6	G	79
14	C	6	(Germany) Joest Racing	(France) Jean-Louis Ricci (France) Henri Pescarolo	Porsche 962C	G	78
14	C	6	(Germany) Joest Racing	(France) Jean-Louis Ricci (France) Henri Pescarolo	Porsche Type-935 3.2L Turbo Flat-6	G	78
15	C	26	(Germany) Obermaier Racing	(Germany) Harald Grohs (Germany) Jürgen Oppermann	Porsche 962C	G	77
15	C	26	(Germany) Obermaier Racing	(Germany) Harald Grohs (Germany) Jürgen Oppermann	Porsche Type-935 3.0L Turbo Flat-6	G	77
16	C	39	(Switzerland) Swiss Team Salamin	(Switzerland) Antoine Salamin (Italy) Luigi Taverna	Porsche 962C	G	76
16	C	39	(Switzerland) Swiss Team Salamin	(Switzerland) Antoine Salamin (Italy) Luigi Taverna	Porsche Type-935 3.0L Turbo Flat-6	G	76
17	C	14	(United Kingdom) Richard Lloyd Racing	(Germany) Manuel Reuter (United Kingdom) James Weaver	Porsche 962C GTi	G	70
17	C	14	(United Kingdom) Richard Lloyd Racing	(Germany) Manuel Reuter (United Kingdom) James Weaver	Porsche Type-935 3.0L Turbo Flat-6	G	70
18 DSQ^{†}	C	20	(United Kingdom) Team Davey	(Mexico) Alfonso Toledano	Porsche 962C	D	76
18 DSQ^{†}	C	20	(United Kingdom) Team Davey	(Mexico) Alfonso Toledano	Porsche Type-935 2.8L Turbo Flat-6	D	76
19 DNF	C	24	(Japan) Nissan Motorsports International	(United Kingdom) Mark Blundell (Italy) Gianfranco Brancatelli	Nissan R90CK	D	79
19 DNF	C	24	(Japan) Nissan Motorsports International	(United Kingdom) Mark Blundell (Italy) Gianfranco Brancatelli	Nissan VRH35Z 3.5L Turbo V8	D	79
20 DNF	C	9	(Germany) Joest Porsche Racing	(Germany) "John Winter" (Sweden) Stanley Dickens	Porsche 962C	MI	77
20 DNF	C	9	(Germany) Joest Porsche Racing	(Germany) "John Winter" (Sweden) Stanley Dickens	Porsche Type-935 3.0L Turbo Flat-6	MI	77
21 DNF	C	33	(Austria) Konrad Motorsport (Germany) Dauer Racing	(Brazil) Raul Boesel	Porsche 962C	BF	65
21 DNF	C	33	(Austria) Konrad Motorsport (Germany) Dauer Racing	(Brazil) Raul Boesel	Porsche Type-935 3.0L Turbo Flat-6	BF	65
22 DNF	C	16	(Switzerland) Brun Motorsport	(Spain) Jesús Pareja (Switzerland) Walter Brun	Porsche 962C	Y	62
22 DNF	C	16	(Switzerland) Brun Motorsport	(Spain) Jesús Pareja (Switzerland) Walter Brun	Porsche Type-935 3.0L Turbo Flat-6	Y	62
23 DNF	C	37	(Japan) Toyota Team Tom's	(Italy) Roberto Ravaglia (United Kingdom) Johnny Dumfries	Toyota 89C-V	B	56
23 DNF	C	37	(Japan) Toyota Team Tom's	(Italy) Roberto Ravaglia (United Kingdom) Johnny Dumfries	Toyota R36V 3.6L Turbo V8	B	56
24 DNF	C	40	(United Kingdom) The Berkeley Team London	(Italy) Ranieri Randaccio (Italy) Pasquale Barberio	Spice SE89C	G	50
24 DNF	C	40	(United Kingdom) The Berkeley Team London	(Italy) Ranieri Randaccio (Italy) Pasquale Barberio	Ford Cosworth DFZ 3.5L V8	G	50
25 DNF	C	15	(Switzerland) Brun Motorsport	(Argentina) Oscar Larrauri (Norway) Harald Huysman	Porsche 962C	Y	20
25 DNF	C	15	(Switzerland) Brun Motorsport	(Argentina) Oscar Larrauri (Norway) Harald Huysman	Porsche Type-935 3.0L Turbo Flat-6	Y	20
26 DNF	C	28	(United Kingdom) Chamberlain Engineering	(Netherlands) Cor Euser (Switzerland) Mario Hytten	Spice SE89C	G	20
26 DNF	C	28	(United Kingdom) Chamberlain Engineering	(Netherlands) Cor Euser (Switzerland) Mario Hytten	Ford Cosworth DFZ 3.5L V8	G	20
27 DNF	C	30	(United Kingdom) GP Motorsport	(United Kingdom) Will Hoy (France) Philippe de Henning	Spice SE90C	D	14
27 DNF	C	30	(United Kingdom) GP Motorsport	(United Kingdom) Will Hoy (France) Philippe de Henning	Ford Cosworth DFR 3.5L V8	D	14
28 DNF	C	27	(Germany) Obermaier Racing	(Germany) Otto Altenbach (Germany) Jürgen Lässig	Porsche 962C	G	11
28 DNF	C	27	(Germany) Obermaier Racing	(Germany) Otto Altenbach (Germany) Jürgen Lässig	Porsche Type-935 3.0L Turbo Flat-6	G	11
29 DNF	C	35	(France) Louis Descartes	(France) François Migault (France) Denis Morin	ALD C289	D	8
29 DNF	C	35	(France) Louis Descartes	(France) François Migault (France) Denis Morin	Ford Cosworth DFZ 3.5L V8	D	8
30 DNF	C	32	(Austria) Konrad Motorsport	(Austria) Franz Konrad (Italy) Almo Coppelli	Porsche 962C	G	7
30 DNF	C	32	(Austria) Konrad Motorsport	(Austria) Franz Konrad (Italy) Almo Coppelli	Porsche Type-935 3.0L Turbo Flat-6	G	7
31 DNF	C	36	(Japan) Toyota Team Tom's	(United Kingdom) Geoff Lees (Japan) Aguri Suzuki	Toyota 90C-V	B	4
31 DNF	C	36	(Japan) Toyota Team Tom's	(United Kingdom) Geoff Lees (Japan) Aguri Suzuki	Toyota R36V 3.6L Turbo V8	B	4
32 DNF	C	29	(United Kingdom) Chamberlain Engineering	(United Kingdom) Nick Adams (Netherlands) Charles Zwolsman	Spice SE90C	G	?
32 DNF	C	29	(United Kingdom) Chamberlain Engineering	(United Kingdom) Nick Adams (Netherlands) Charles Zwolsman	Ford Cosworth DFZ 3.5L V8	G	?
DNS	C	19	(United Kingdom) Team Davey	(Italy) Bruno Giacomelli (Italy) Fulvio Ballabio	Porsche 962C	D	-
DNS	C	19	(United Kingdom) Team Davey	(Italy) Bruno Giacomelli (Italy) Fulvio Ballabio	Porsche Type-935 3.0L Turbo Flat-6	D	-
DNQ	C	12	(France) Courage Compétition	(Switzerland) Bernard Thuner (Greece) Costas Los	Cougar C24S	G	-
DNQ	C	12	(France) Courage Compétition	(Switzerland) Bernard Thuner (Greece) Costas Los	Porsche Type-935 2.8L Turbo Flat-6	G	-
DNQ	C	34	(France) Equipe Alméras Fréres	(France) Jacques Alméras (France) Jean-Marie Alméras	Porsche 962C	G	-
DNQ	C	34	(France) Equipe Alméras Fréres	(France) Jacques Alméras (France) Jean-Marie Alméras	Porsche Type-935 2.8L Turbo Flat-6	G	-
DNQ	C	41	(Italy) Alba Racing Team	(Italy) Marco Brand (Italy) Fabio Mancini	Alba AR20	G	-
DNQ	C	41	(Italy) Alba Racing Team	(Italy) Marco Brand (Italy) Fabio Mancini	Subaru (Motori Moderni) 1235 3.5L Flat-12	G	-

† - #20 Team Davey was disqualified for being underweight in post-race inspection.

== Statistics ==
- Pole Position - #1 Mauro Baldi - 1:29.165
- Fastest Lap - #2 Jochen Mass - 1:33.426
- Average Speed - 210.532 km/h

World Sportscar Championship
Previous race: 1990 480 km of Suzuka	1990 season	Next race: 1990 480 km of Silverstone
