= 1990 480 km of Suzuka =

Layout of the Suzuka International Racing Course (1987-2002)

The 1990 480 km of Suzuka was the opening round of the 1990 World Sportscar Championship season, taking place at Suzuka Circuit, Japan. It took place on April 8, 1990.

== Official results ==
Class winners in bold. Cars failing to complete 75% of the winner's distance marked as Not Classified (NC).

Pos	Class	No	Team	Drivers	Chassis	Tyre	Laps
Pos	Class	No	Team	Drivers	Engine	Tyre	Laps
1	**C**	**1**	**(Germany) Team Sauber Mercedes**	**(Italy) Mauro Baldi (France) Jean-Louis Schlesser**	**Mercedes-Benz C9**	**G**	**82**
1	**C**	**1**	**(Germany) Team Sauber Mercedes**	**(Italy) Mauro Baldi (France) Jean-Louis Schlesser**	**Mercedes-Benz M119 5.0L Turbo V8**	**G**	**82**
2	C	2	(Germany) Team Sauber Mercedes	(Germany) Jochen Mass (Austria) Karl Wendlinger	Mercedes-Benz C9	**G**	82
2	C	2	(Germany) Team Sauber Mercedes	(Germany) Jochen Mass (Austria) Karl Wendlinger	Mercedes-Benz M119 5.0L Turbo V8	**G**	82
3	C	24	(Japan) Nissan Motorsports International	(Japan) Masahiro Hasemi (Sweden) Anders Olofsson	Nissan R89C	**D**	82
3	C	24	(Japan) Nissan Motorsports International	(Japan) Masahiro Hasemi (Sweden) Anders Olofsson	Nissan VRH35Z 3.5L Turbo V8	**D**	82
4	C	36	(Japan) Toyota Team Tom's	(Japan) Hitoshi Ogawa (United Kingdom) Geoff Lees	Toyota 90C-V	**B**	81
4	C	36	(Japan) Toyota Team Tom's	(Japan) Hitoshi Ogawa (United Kingdom) Geoff Lees	Toyota R36V 3.6L Turbo V8	**B**	81
5	C	11	(Germany) Porsche Kremer Racing (Japan) Advan Alpha Nova	(Japan) Kunimitsu Takahashi (Japan) Kazou Mogi	Porsche 962C	**Y**	80
5	C	11	(Germany) Porsche Kremer Racing (Japan) Advan Alpha Nova	(Japan) Kunimitsu Takahashi (Japan) Kazou Mogi	Porsche Type-935 3.0L Turbo Flat-6	**Y**	80
6	C	15	(Switzerland) Brun Motorsport	(Norway) Harald Huysman (Argentina) Oscar Larrauri	Porsche 962C	**Y**	80
6	C	15	(Switzerland) Brun Motorsport	(Norway) Harald Huysman (Argentina) Oscar Larrauri	Porsche Type-935 3.0L Turbo Flat-6	**Y**	80
7	C	17	(Switzerland) Brun Motorsport (Japan) Trust Racing Team	(Sweden) Steven Andskär (South Africa) George Fouché	Porsche 962C GTi	**Y**	80
7	C	17	(Switzerland) Brun Motorsport (Japan) Trust Racing Team	(Sweden) Steven Andskär (South Africa) George Fouché	Porsche Type-935 3.0L Turbo Flat-6	**Y**	80
8	C	34	(France) Equipe Almeras Fréres (Japan) The Alpha Racing	(United Kingdom) Derek Bell (United Kingdom) Tiff Needell	Porsche 962C	**G**	80
8	C	34	(France) Equipe Almeras Fréres (Japan) The Alpha Racing	(United Kingdom) Derek Bell (United Kingdom) Tiff Needell	Porsche Type-935 2.8L Turbo Flat-6	**G**	80
9	C	19	(United Kingdom) Team Davey (Japan) Omron Racing Team	(Sweden) Eje Elgh (Australia) Vern Schuppan	Porsche 962C	**D**	79
9	C	19	(United Kingdom) Team Davey (Japan) Omron Racing Team	(Sweden) Eje Elgh (Australia) Vern Schuppan	Porsche Type-935 3.0L Turbo Flat-6	**D**	79
10	C	39	(Switzerland) Swiss Team Salamin (Japan) From-A Racing	(Germany) Volker Weidler (Japan) Akihiko Nakaya	Porsche 962C	**G**	79
10	C	39	(Switzerland) Swiss Team Salamin (Japan) From-A Racing	(Germany) Volker Weidler (Japan) Akihiko Nakaya	Porsche 3.0L Turbo Flat-6	**G**	79
11	C	8	(Germany) Joest Porsche Racing	(France) Henri Pescarolo (United Kingdom) Jonathan Palmer	Porsche 962C	**M**	79
11	C	8	(Germany) Joest Porsche Racing	(France) Henri Pescarolo (United Kingdom) Jonathan Palmer	Porsche Type-935 3.2L Turbo Flat-6	**M**	79
12	C	13	(France) Courage Compétition	(France) Pascal Fabre (France) Lionel Robert	Cougar C24S	**G**	78
12	C	13	(France) Courage Compétition	(France) Pascal Fabre (France) Lionel Robert	Porsche Type-935 3.0L Turbo Flat-6	**G**	78
13	C	10	(Germany) Porsche Kremer Racing	(Germany) Bernd Schneider (Japan) Hideki Okada	Porsche 962CK6	**Y**	77
13	C	10	(Germany) Porsche Kremer Racing	(Germany) Bernd Schneider (Japan) Hideki Okada	Porsche Type-935 3.0L Turbo Flat-6	**Y**	77
14	C	12	(France) Courage Compétition (Japan) Alpha Racing	(United Kingdom) Will Hoy (Japan) Kenji Takahashi	Porsche 962C	**Y**	77
14	C	12	(France) Courage Compétition (Japan) Alpha Racing	(United Kingdom) Will Hoy (Japan) Kenji Takahashi	Porsche Type-935 3.0L Turbo Flat-6	**Y**	77
15	C	14	(United Kingdom) Richard Lloyd Racing	(Germany) Manuel Reuter (Spain) Luis Pérez-Sala	Porsche 962C GTi	**G**	77
15	C	14	(United Kingdom) Richard Lloyd Racing	(Germany) Manuel Reuter (Spain) Luis Pérez-Sala	Porsche Type-935 3.0L Turbo Flat-6	**G**	77
16	C	9	(Germany) Joest Porsche Racing	(Sweden) Stanley Dickens (Germany) "John Winter"	Porsche 962C	**M**	76
16	C	9	(Germany) Joest Porsche Racing	(Sweden) Stanley Dickens (Germany) "John Winter"	Porsche Type-935 3.0L Turbo Flat-6	**M**	76
17	C	20	(United Kingdom) Team Davey	(United Kingdom) Tim Lee-Davey (Mexico) Alfonso Toledano	Porsche 962C	**D**	76
17	C	20	(United Kingdom) Team Davey	(United Kingdom) Tim Lee-Davey (Mexico) Alfonso Toledano	Porsche Type-935 2.8L Turbo Flat-6	**D**	76
18	C	21	(United Kingdom) Spice Engineering	(Chile) Eliseo Salazar (Mexico) Bernard Jourdain	Spice SE90C	**G**	75
18	C	21	(United Kingdom) Spice Engineering	(Chile) Eliseo Salazar (Mexico) Bernard Jourdain	Ford Cosworth DFR 3.5L V8	**G**	75
19	C	32	(Austria) Konrad Motorsport	(Austria) Franz Konrad (France) Jean-Louis Ricci	Porsche 962C	**G**	75
19	C	32	(Austria) Konrad Motorsport	(Austria) Franz Konrad (France) Jean-Louis Ricci	Porsche Type-935 3.0L Turbo Flat-6	**G**	75
20	C	37	(Japan) Toyota Team Tom's	(United Kingdom) Johnny Dumfries (Japan) Aguri Suzuki	Toyota 90C-V	**B**	73
20	C	37	(Japan) Toyota Team Tom's	(United Kingdom) Johnny Dumfries (Japan) Aguri Suzuki	Toyota R36V 3.6L Turbo V8	**B**	73
21 NC	C	30	(United Kingdom) GP Motorsport	(United Kingdom) David Hobbs (France) Philippe de Henning	Spice SE90C	**G**	60
21 NC	C	30	(United Kingdom) GP Motorsport	(United Kingdom) David Hobbs (France) Philippe de Henning	Ford Cosworth DFR 3.5L V8	**G**	60
22 DSQ^{†}	C	27	(Germany) Obermaier Primagaz	(Germany) Jürgen Lässig (Germany) Otto Altenbach	Porsche 962C	**G**	78
22 DSQ^{†}	C	27	(Germany) Obermaier Primagaz	(Germany) Jürgen Lässig (Germany) Otto Altenbach	Porsche Type-935 3.0L Turbo Flat-6	**G**	78
23 DNF	C	38	(Japan) Toyota Team Tom's (Japan) Team SARD	(Austria) Roland Ratzenberger (France) Pierre-Henri Raphanel	Toyota 90C-V	**B**	79
23 DNF	C	38	(Japan) Toyota Team Tom's (Japan) Team SARD	(Austria) Roland Ratzenberger (France) Pierre-Henri Raphanel	Toyota R36V 3.6L Turbo V8	**B**	79
24 DNF	C	3	(United Kingdom) Silk Cut Jaguar	(United Kingdom) Martin Brundle (France) Alain Ferté	Jaguar XJR-11	**G**	77
24 DNF	C	3	(United Kingdom) Silk Cut Jaguar	(United Kingdom) Martin Brundle (France) Alain Ferté	Jaguar JV6 3.5L Turbo V6	**G**	77
25 DNF	C	16	(Switzerland) Brun Motorsport	(Spain) Jesús Pareja (Switzerland) Walter Brun	Porsche 962C	**Y**	74
25 DNF	C	16	(Switzerland) Brun Motorsport	(Spain) Jesús Pareja (Switzerland) Walter Brun	Porsche Type-935 3.0L Turbo Flat-6	**Y**	74
26 DNF	C	23	(Japan) Nissan Motorsports International	(United Kingdom) Andrew Gilbert-Scott (Japan) Kazuyoshi Hoshino	Nissan R90CP	**D**	65
26 DNF	C	23	(Japan) Nissan Motorsports International	(United Kingdom) Andrew Gilbert-Scott (Japan) Kazuyoshi Hoshino	Nissan VRH35Z 3.5L Turbo V8	**D**	65
27 DNF	C	25	(Japan) Nissan Motorsports International (Japan) Cabin Racing Team (Japan) Team Le Mans	(United Kingdom) Kenny Acheson (Japan) Takao Wada	Nissan R89C	**D**	45
27 DNF	C	25	(Japan) Nissan Motorsports International (Japan) Cabin Racing Team (Japan) Team Le Mans	(United Kingdom) Kenny Acheson (Japan) Takao Wada	Nissan VRH35Z 3.5L Turbo V8	**D**	45
28 DNF	C	4	(United Kingdom) Silk Cut Jaguar	(Netherlands) Jan Lammers (United Kingdom) Andy Wallace	Jaguar XJR-11	**G**	44
28 DNF	C	4	(United Kingdom) Silk Cut Jaguar	(Netherlands) Jan Lammers (United Kingdom) Andy Wallace	Jaguar JV6 3.5L Turbo V6	**G**	44
29 DNF	C	26	(Germany) Obermaier Primagaz	(Germany) Harald Grohs (Germany) Jürgen Oppermann	Porsche 962C	**G**	39
29 DNF	C	26	(Germany) Obermaier Primagaz	(Germany) Harald Grohs (Germany) Jürgen Oppermann	Porsche Type-935 3.0L Turbo Flat-6	**G**	39
30 DNF	C	35	(France) Louis Descartes	(France) François Migault (France) Louis Descartes	ALD C190	**D**	36
30 DNF	C	35	(France) Louis Descartes	(France) François Migault (France) Louis Descartes	Ford Cosworth DFZ 3.5L V8	**D**	36
31 DNF	C	22	(United Kingdom) Spice Engineering	(United Kingdom) Tim Harvey (Italy) Bruno Giacomelli	Spice SE90C	**G**	28
31 DNF	C	22	(United Kingdom) Spice Engineering	(United Kingdom) Tim Harvey (Italy) Bruno Giacomelli	Ford Cosworth DFR 3.5L V8	**G**	28
32 DNF	C	7	(Germany) Joest Porsche Racing	(France) Bob Wollek (Germany) Frank Jelinski	Porsche 962C	**M**	23
32 DNF	C	7	(Germany) Joest Porsche Racing	(France) Bob Wollek (Germany) Frank Jelinski	Porsche Type-935 3.2L Turbo Flat-6	**M**	23
33 DNF	C	40	(United Kingdom) The Berkeley Team London	(Italy) Ranieri Randaccio (Italy) "Stingbrace"	Spice SE90C	**G**	14
33 DNF	C	40	(United Kingdom) The Berkeley Team London	(Italy) Ranieri Randaccio (Italy) "Stingbrace"	Ford Cosworth DFZ 3.5L V8	**G**	14
34 DNF	C	29	(United Kingdom) Chamberlain Engineering (Japan) British Barn Racing Team	(Japan) Tsunehisa Asai (Japan) Jiro Yoneyama	British Barn BB90	?	13
34 DNF	C	29	(United Kingdom) Chamberlain Engineering (Japan) British Barn Racing Team	(Japan) Tsunehisa Asai (Japan) Jiro Yoneyama	Ford Cosworth DFZ 3.5L V8	?	13
DSQ	C	28	(United Kingdom) Chamberlain Engineering	(Netherlands) Cor Euser (Spain) Fermín Vélez	Spice SE89C	**G**	-
DSQ	C	28	(United Kingdom) Chamberlain Engineering	(Netherlands) Cor Euser (Spain) Fermín Vélez	Ford Cosworth DFZ 3.5L V8	**G**	-
DNQ	C	41	(Italy) Alba Formula Team	(Italy) Marco Brand (Italy) Gianfranco Brancatelli	Alba AR20	**G**	-
DNQ	C	41	(Italy) Alba Formula Team	(Italy) Marco Brand (Italy) Gianfranco Brancatelli	Subaru (Motori Moderni) 1235 3.5L Flat-12	**G**	-

† - #27 Obermaier Primagaz was disqualified for being underweight in post-race inspection.

== Statistics ==
- Pole Position - #36 Geoff Lees - 1:48.716
- Fastest Lap - #3 Martin Brundle - 1:53.732
- Average Speed - 176.031 km/h

World Sportscar Championship
Previous race: None	1990 season	Next race: 1990 480 km of Monza
