= List of 1985 motorsport champions =

1985 motorsport champions
Previous: 1984	Next: 1986

This list of 1985 motorsport champions is a list of national or international auto racing series with a Championship decided by the points or positions earned by a driver from multiple races.

== Dirt oval racing ==
Series	Champion	Refer
World of Outlaws Sprint Car Series	(United States) Steve Kinser	
World of Outlaws Sprint Car Series	Teams: (United States) Karl Kinser Racing	

== Drag racing ==
Series	Champion	Refer
NHRA Winston Drag Racing Series	Top Fuel: (United States) Don Garlits	1985 NHRA Winston Drag Racing Series
NHRA Winston Drag Racing Series	Funny Car: (United States) Kenny Bernstein	1985 NHRA Winston Drag Racing Series
NHRA Winston Drag Racing Series	Pro Stock: (United States) Bob Glidden	1985 NHRA Winston Drag Racing Series

== Karting ==
Series	Driver	Season article
World Formula K Championship 135 cc	(United Kingdom) Mike Wilson	
World Formula E SuperKart Championship 250 cc	(Denmark) Poul Petersen	
Juniors World Cup 125 cc	(Italy) Andrea Gilardi	
CIK-FIA Karting European Championship	FK: (Germany) Stefan Frietsch	
CIK-FIA Karting European Championship	ICC: (Italy) Pietro Sassi	
CIK-FIA Karting European Championship	ICA: (Finland) Jukka Virtanen	

== Motorcycle racing ==
Series	Rider	Season article
500cc World Championship	(United States) Freddie Spencer	1985 Grand Prix motorcycle racing season
250cc World Championship	(United States) Freddie Spencer	1985 Grand Prix motorcycle racing season
125cc World Championship	(Italy) Fausto Gresini	1985 Grand Prix motorcycle racing season
80cc World Championship	(Switzerland) Stefan Dörflinger	1985 Grand Prix motorcycle racing season
Sidecar World Championship	(Netherlands) Egbert Streuer (Netherlands) Bernard Schnieders	
TT Formula 1 World Championship	(United Kingdom) Joey Dunlop	
TT Formula 2 World Championship	(United Kingdom) Brian Reid	
Endurance World Championship	(France) Gerard Coudray (France) Patrick Igoa	
Speedway World Championship	(Denmark) Erik Gundersen	1985 Individual Speedway World Championship
AMA Grand National Championship	(United States) Bubba Shobert	
AMA Superbike Championship	(United States) Fred Merkel	
Australian Superbike Series	(Australia) Rob Phillis	

=== Motocross ===
Series	Rider	Season article
FIM Motocross World Championship	500cc: (United Kingdom) David Thorpe	
FIM Motocross World Championship	250cc: (Austria) Heinz Kinigadner	
FIM Motocross World Championship	125cc: (Finland) Pekka Vehkonen	

== Open wheel racing ==
Series	Driver	Season article
FIA Formula One World Championship	(France) Alain Prost	1985 Formula One World Championship
FIA Formula One World Championship	Constructors: (United Kingdom) McLaren-TAG	1985 Formula One World Championship
CART PPG Indy Car World Series	(United States) Al Unser	1985 CART PPG Indy Car World Series
CART PPG Indy Car World Series	Manufacturers: (United Kingdom) Cosworth	1985 CART PPG Indy Car World Series
CART PPG Indy Car World Series	Rookies: (Netherlands) Arie Luyendyk	1985 CART PPG Indy Car World Series
Australian Drivers' Championship	(Australia) John Bowe	1985 Australian Drivers' Championship
Formula Atlantic East Coast	(United States) Michael Angus	1985 Formula Atlantic East Coast season
Formula Atlantic West Coast	(United States) Jeff Wood	1985 Formula Atlantic West Coast season
Cup of Peace and Friendship	(East Germany) Ulli Melkus	1985 Cup of Peace and Friendship
Cup of Peace and Friendship	Nations: Czechoslovakia	1985 Cup of Peace and Friendship
SCCA Formula Super Vee	(United States) Ken Johnson	1985 SCCA Formula Super Vee season
South African National Drivers Championship	(South Africa) Trevor van Rooyen	1985 South African National Drivers Championship
Formula Two
European Formula 3000 Championship	(Germany) Christian Danner	1985 European Formula 3000 Championship
Australian Formula 2 Championship	(Australia) Peter Glover	1985 Australian Formula 2 Championship
All-Japan Formula Two Championship	(Japan) Satoru Nakajima	1985 Japanese Formula Two Championship
South American Formula Two Championship	(Argentina) Guillermo Maldonado	1985 South American Formula Two Championship
Formula Three
All-Japan Formula Three Championship	(Japan) Shuji Hyoudo	1985 All-Japan Formula Three Championship
All-Japan Formula Three Championship	Teams: (Japan) Le Garage Cox Racing	1985 All-Japan Formula Three Championship
Austria Formula 3 Cup	(Austria) Willi Schuster	1985 Austria Formula 3 Cup
British Formula Three Championship	(Brazil) Maurício Gugelmin	1985 British Formula Three Championship
British Formula Three Championship	National: (Jamaica) Carlton Tingling	1985 British Formula Three Championship
Chilean Formula Three Championship	(Chile) Giuseppe Bacigalupo	1985 Chilean Formula Three Championship
Finnish Formula Three Championship	(Finland) Sami Pensala	1985 Finnish Formula Three Championship
Finnish Formula Three Championship	Teams: (Finland) Kuomu Sport	1985 Finnish Formula Three Championship
French Formula Three Championship	(France) Pierre-Henri Raphanel	1985 French Formula Three Championship
French Formula Three Championship	Teams: (France) Oreca	1985 French Formula Three Championship
German Formula Three Championship	(Germany) Volker Weidler	1985 German Formula Three Championship
Italian Formula Three Championship	(Switzerland) Franco Forini	1985 Italian Formula Three Championship
Italian Formula Three Championship	Teams: (Italy) Forti Corse	1985 Italian Formula Three Championship
Nordic Formula 3	(Sweden) Steven Andskär	
Soviet Formula 3 Championship	(Estonian Soviet Socialist Republic) Toomas Napa	1985 Soviet Formula 3 Championship
Swiss Formula Three Championship	(Switzerland) Jakob Bordoli	1985 Swiss Formula Three Championship
Formula Renault
French Formula Renault Championship	(France) Éric Bernard	1985 French Formula Renault Championship
Formula Renault Argentina	(Argentina) Miguel Angel Etchegaray	1985 Formula Renault Argentina
Formula Ford
Australian Formula Ford Championship	(Australia) Tomas Mezera	1985 Motorcraft Formula Ford Driver to Europe Series
Brazilian Formula Ford Championship	(Brazil) Serge Buchrieser	1985 Brazilian Formula Ford Championship
British Formula Ford Championship	(Belgium) Bertrand Gachot	1985 British Formula Ford Championship
Danish Formula Ford Championship	(Denmark) Svend Hansen	
Dutch Formula Ford 1600 Championship	(Netherlands) Maartin Bottelier	1985 Dutch Formula Ford 1600 Championship
EFDA Formula Ford 2000 Championship	(Canada) Bertrand Fabi	
European Formula Ford Championship	(Brazil) Paulo Carcasci	1985 European Formula Ford Championship
Finnish Formula Ford Championship	(Finland) Jari Haavisto	
German Formula Ford Championship	(Germany) Stefan Neuberger	
New Zealand Formula Ford Championship	(New Zealand) John Crawford	
Formula Ford 1600 Nordic Championship	(Sweden) Reine Andersson	
Scottish Formula Ford Championship	(United Kingdom) Cameron Binnie	
Swedish Formula Ford Championship	(Sweden) Thomas Danielsson	
Formula Ford Sweden Junior	(Sweden) Niclas Schönström	

== Rallying ==
Series	Driver	Season article
World Rally Championship	(Finland) Timo Salonen	1985 World Rally Championship
World Rally Championship	Co-Drivers: (Finland) Seppo Harjanne	1985 World Rally Championship
World Rally Championship	Manufacturers: (France) Peugeot	1985 World Rally Championship
African Rally Championship	(Rwanda) Luc Requile	1985 African Rally Championship
Australian Rally Championship	(Australia) Barry Lowe	1985 Australian Rally Championship
Australian Rally Championship	Co-Drivers: (Australia) Kevin Pedder	1985 Australian Rally Championship
British Rally Championship	(United Kingdom) Russell Brookes	1985 British Rally Championship
British Rally Championship	Co-Drivers: (United Kingdom) Mike Broad	1985 British Rally Championship
Canadian Rally Championship	(Canada) Tim Bendle	1985 Canadian Rally Championship
Canadian Rally Championship	Co-Drivers: (Canada) Louis Belanger	1985 Canadian Rally Championship
Deutsche Rallye Meisterschaft	(Sweden) Kalle Grundel	
Estonian Rally Championship	(Estonian Soviet Socialist Republic) Aare Klooren	1985 Estonian Rally Championship
Estonian Rally Championship	Co-Drivers: (Estonian Soviet Socialist Republic) Urmas Püssim	1985 Estonian Rally Championship
European Rally Championship	(Italy) Dario Cerrato	1985 European Rally Championship
European Rally Championship	Co-Drivers: (Italy) Giuseppe Cerri	1985 European Rally Championship
Finnish Rally Championship	Group A: (Finland) Mika Arpiainen	1985 Finnish Rally Championship
Finnish Rally Championship	Group 2: (Finland) Kyösti Hämäläinen	1985 Finnish Rally Championship
Finnish Rally Championship	Group B: (Finland) Antero Laine	1985 Finnish Rally Championship
French Rally Championship	(France) Guy Fréquelin	
Hungarian Rally Championship	(Hungary) Attila Ferjáncz	
Hungarian Rally Championship	Co-Drivers: (Hungary) János Tandari	
Italian Rally Championship	(Italy) Fabrizio Tabaton	
Italian Rally Championship	Co-Drivers: (Italy) Luciano Tedeschini	
Italian Rally Championship	Manufacturers: (Italy) Lancia	
Italian Rally Championship	Open: (Italy) Dario Cerrato	
Italian Rally Championship	Open Co-Drivers: (Italy) Giuseppe Cerri	
Italian Rally Championship	Open Manufacturers: (Italy) Lancia	
Middle East Rally Championship	(Qatar) Saeed Al-Hajri	
New Zealand Rally Championship	(New Zealand) Brian Stokes	1985 New Zealand Rally Championship
Polish Rally Championship	(Poland) Andrzej Koper	
Romanian Rally Championship	(Romania) Florin Nuță	
Scottish Rally Championship	(United Kingdom) George Marshall	
Scottish Rally Championship	Co-Drivers: (United Kingdom) Roger Anderson	
South African National Rally Championship	(South Africa) Sarel van der Merwe	
South African National Rally Championship	Co-Drivers: (South Africa) Franz Boshoff	
South African National Rally Championship	Manufacturers: (Germany) Volkswagen	
Spanish Rally Championship	(Spain) Salvador Servia	
Spanish Rally Championship	Co-Drivers: (Spain) Victor Sabater	

=== Rallycross ===
Series	Driver	Season article
FIA European Rallycross Championship	Div 1: (Sweden) Anders Norstedt	1985 European Rallycross Championship
FIA European Rallycross Championship	Div 2: (Finland) Matti Alamäki	1985 European Rallycross Championship
British Rallycross Championship	(United Kingdom) Trevor Hopkins	

== Sports car and GT ==
Series	Driver	Season article
World Sportscar Championship	C1: (United Kingdom) Derek Bell; C1: (West Germany) Hans-Joachim Stuck	1985 World Sportscar Championship
World Sportscar Championship	C1 Teams: (West Germany) Rothmans Porsche	1985 World Sportscar Championship
World Sportscar Championship	C2: (United Kingdom) Gordon Spice; C2: (United Kingdom) Ray Bellm	1985 World Sportscar Championship
World Sportscar Championship	C2 Teams: (United Kingdom) Spice Engineering	1985 World Sportscar Championship
IMSA GT Championship	GTP: (United States) Al Holbert	1985 IMSA GT Championship
IMSA GT Championship	Lights: (United States) Jim Downing	1985 IMSA GT Championship
IMSA GT Championship	GTO: (Canada) John Jones	1985 IMSA GT Championship
IMSA GT Championship	GTU: (United States) Jack Baldwin	1985 IMSA GT Championship
All Japan Endurance Championship	(Japan) Kunimitsu Takahashi	1985 All Japan Endurance Championship
All Japan Endurance Championship	Manufacturers: (Germany) Porsche	1985 All Japan Endurance Championship
Australian GT Championship	(Australia) Bryan Thomson	1985 Australian GT Championship
Australian Sports Car Championship	(Australia) Chris Clearihan	1985 Australian Sports Car Championship
Can-Am	(United States) Rick Miaskiewicz	1985 Can-Am season
Can-Am	Under 2 Litre: (United States) Lou Sell	1985 Can-Am season

== Stock car racing ==
Series	Driver	Season article
NASCAR Winston Cup Series	(United States) Darrell Waltrip	1985 NASCAR Winston Cup Series
NASCAR Winston Cup Series	Manufacturers: (United States) Chevrolet	1985 NASCAR Winston Cup Series
NASCAR Busch Grand National Series	(United States) Jack Ingram	1985 NASCAR Busch Grand National Series
NASCAR Busch Grand National Series	Manufacturers: (United States) Pontiac	1985 NASCAR Busch Grand National Series
NASCAR Winston West Series	(United States) Jim Robinson	1985 NASCAR Winston West Series
ARCA Racing Series	(United States) Lee Raymond	1985 ARCA Racing Series
Turismo Carretera	(Argentina) Roberto Mouras	1985 Turismo Carretera

== Touring car ==
Series	Driver	Season article
European Touring Car Championship	(Italy) Gianfranco Brancatelli (Sweden) Thomas Lindström	
Australian Touring Car Championship	(New Zealand) Jim Richards	1985 Australian Touring Car Championship
Australian Endurance Championship	(New Zealand) Jim Richards	1985 Australian Endurance Championship
Australian Manufacturers' Championship	(Germany) BMW	1985 Australian Manufacturers' Championship
British Saloon Car Championship	(United Kingdom) Andy Rouse	1985 British Saloon Car Championship
Campeonato Brasileiro de Marcas e Pilotos	(Brazil) Fábio Greco (Brazil) Lian Duarte	1985 Campeonato Brasileiro de Marcas e Pilotos
Deutsche Rennsport Meisterschaft	(Germany) Jochen Mass	1985 Deutsche Rennsport Meisterschaft
Deutschen Produktionswagen Meisterschaft	(Sweden) Per Stureson	1985 Deutschen Produktionswagen Meisterschaft
Europa Cup Renault Alpine V6 Turbo	(Argentina) Oscar Larrauri	1985 Europa Cup Renault Alpine V6 Turbo
French Supertouring Championship	(France) Jean-Louis Schlesser	
Japanese Touring Car Championship	(Japan) Naoki Nagasaka	1985 Japanese Touring Car Championship
Japanese Touring Car Championship	JTC-2: (Japan) Seiichiro Tsujimoto	1985 Japanese Touring Car Championship
Japanese Touring Car Championship	JTC-3: (Japan) Kaoru Hoshino	1985 Japanese Touring Car Championship
New Zealand Touring Car Championship	(New Zealand) Kent Baigent	
AMSCAR Series	(New Zealand) Jim Richards	
Stock Car Brasil	(Brazil) Ingo Hoffmann	1985 Stock Car Brasil season
TC2000 Championship	(Argentina) Rubén Daray	1985 TC2000 Championship

== Truck racing ==
Series	Driver	Season article
European Truck Racing Championship	Class A: (United Kingdom) Rod Chapman	1985 European Truck Racing Championship
European Truck Racing Championship	Class B: (United Kingdom) Richard Walker	1985 European Truck Racing Championship
European Truck Racing Championship	Class C: (France) Yves Barrat	1985 European Truck Racing Championship

== See also ==
- List of motorsport championships
- Auto racing
