= List of 1987 motorsport champions =

1987 motorsport champions
Previous: 1986	Next: 1988

This list of 1987 motorsport champions is a list of national or international auto racing series with a Championship decided by the points or positions earned by a driver from multiple races.

== Dirt oval racing ==
Series	Champion	Refer
World of Outlaws Sprint Car Series	(United States) Steve Kinser	
World of Outlaws Sprint Car Series	Teams: (United States) Karl Kinser Racing	

== Drag racing ==
Series	Champion	Refer
NHRA Winston Drag Racing Series	Top Fuel: (United States) Dick LaHaie	1987 NHRA Winston Drag Racing Series
NHRA Winston Drag Racing Series	Funny Car: (United States) Kenny Bernstein	1987 NHRA Winston Drag Racing Series
NHRA Winston Drag Racing Series	Pro Stock: (United States) Bob Glidden	1987 NHRA Winston Drag Racing Series
NHRA Winston Drag Racing Series	Pro Stock Motorcycle: (United States) Dave Schultz	1987 NHRA Winston Drag Racing Series

== Karting ==
Series	Driver	Season article
CIK-FIA Karting World Championship	FK: (Italy) Giampiero Simoni	
CIK-FIA Karting World Championship	FC: (Italy) Alessandro Piccini	
CIK-FIA Junior World Cup	(Denmark) Jan Magnussen	
CIK-FIA Karting European Championship	FK: (Italy) Alex Zanardi	
CIK-FIA Karting European Championship	ICC: (Italy) Paolo Pulliero	
CIK-FIA Karting European Championship	ICA: (Germany) Michael Schumacher	
World Superkart Championship	(France) Eric Gassin	

== Motorcycle racing ==
Series	Rider	Season article
500cc World Championship	(Australia) Wayne Gardner	1987 Grand Prix motorcycle racing season
250cc World Championship	(West Germany) Anton Mang	1987 Grand Prix motorcycle racing season
125cc World Championship	(Italy) Fausto Gresini	1987 Grand Prix motorcycle racing season
80cc World Championship	(Spain) Jorge Martínez	1987 Grand Prix motorcycle racing season
Speedway World Championship	(Denmark) Hans Nielsen	1987 Individual Speedway World Championship
AMA Superbike Championship	(United States) Wayne Rainey	
Australian Endurance Championship	(Australia) Tony Armstrong	

== Open wheel racing ==
Series	Driver	Season article
FIA Formula One World Championship	(Brazil) Nelson Piquet	1987 Formula One World Championship
FIA Formula One World Championship	Constructors: (United Kingdom) Williams-Honda	1987 Formula One World Championship
FIA Formula One World Championship	Jim Clark Trophy: (United Kingdom) Jonathan Palmer	1987 Formula One World Championship
CART PPG Indy Car World Series	(United States) Bobby Rahal	1987 CART PPG Indy Car World Series
CART PPG Indy Car World Series	Manufacturers: (United Kingdom) Cosworth	1987 CART PPG Indy Car World Series
CART PPG Indy Car World Series	Rookies: (Italy) Fabrizio Barbazza	1987 CART PPG Indy Car World Series
American Racing Series	(Belgium) Didier Theys	1987 American Racing Series season
International Formula 3000	(Italy) Stefano Modena	1987 International Formula 3000 season
All-Japan Formula 3000 Championship	(Japan) Kazuyoshi Hoshino	1987 Japanese Formula 3000 Championship
Australian Formula 2 Championship	(Australia) Arthur Abrahams	1987 Australian Formula 2 Championship
Barber Saab Pro Series	(United States) Ken Murillo	1987 Barber Saab Pro Series
Formula Fiat	(Spain) Jordi Gené	
Australian Drivers' Championship	(Australia) David Brabham	1987 Australian Drivers' Championship
Formula Atlantic East Coast	(United Kingdom) Calvin Fish	1987 Formula Atlantic East Coast season
Formula Atlantic West Coast	(United States) Johnny O'Connell	1987 Formula Atlantic West Coast season
Cup of Peace and Friendship	(Soviet Union) Toomas Napa	1987 Cup of Peace and Friendship
Cup of Peace and Friendship	Nations: Soviet Union	1987 Cup of Peace and Friendship
SCCA Formula Super Vee	(United States) Scott Atchison	1987 SCCA Formula Super Vee season
Formula Three
All-Japan Formula Three Championship	(United States) Ross Cheever	1987 All-Japan Formula Three Championship
All-Japan Formula Three Championship	Teams: (Japan) TOM'S	1987 All-Japan Formula Three Championship
Austria Formula 3 Cup	(Austria) Franz Binder	1987 Austria Formula 3 Cup
British Formula Three Championship	(United Kingdom) Johnny Herbert	1987 British Formula Three Championship
British Formula Three Championship	National: (United Kingdom) Gary Dunn	1987 British Formula Three Championship
Chilean Formula Three Championship	(Chile) Giuseppe Bacigalupo	1987 Chilean Formula Three Championship
European Formula Three Championship	(United Kingdom) David Coyne	
Formula Three Sudamericana	(Brazil) Leonel Friedrich	1987 Formula 3 Sudamericana
French Formula Three Championship	(France) Jean Alesi	
German Formula Three Championship	(Germany) Bernd Schneider	1987 German Formula Three Championship
Italian Formula Three Championship	(Italy) Enrico Bertaggia	1987 Italian Formula Three Championship
Italian Formula Three Championship	Teams: (Italy) Forti Corse	1987 Italian Formula Three Championship
Soviet Formula 3 Championship	(Estonian Soviet Socialist Republic) Toomas Napa	1987 Soviet Formula 3 Championship
Swiss Formula Three Championship	(Switzerland) Jakob Bordoli	1987 Swiss Formula Three Championship
Formula Renault
French Formula Renault Championship	(France) Claude Degremont	1987 French Formula Renault Championship
Formula Renault Argentina	(Argentina) Daniel Neviani	1987 Formula Renault Argentina
Formula Ford
Australian Formula Ford Championship	(Australia) Peter Verheyen	1987 Motorcraft Formula Ford Driver to Europe Series
Belgian Formula Ford Championship	(Belgium) Patrick Dewulf	
Benelux Formula Ford 1600 Championship	(Belgium) Patrick Dewulf	
Brazilian Formula Ford Championship	(Brazil) Gil de Ferran	
British Formula Ford Championship	(United Kingdom) Eddie Irvine	1987 British Formula Ford Championship
British Formula Ford 2000 Championship	(Finland) JJ Lehto	
Danish Formula Ford Championship	(Denmark) Svend Hansen	
Dutch Formula Ford 1600 Championship	(Netherlands) Piet Bouwmeister	1987 Dutch Formula Ford 1600 Championship
EFDA Formula Ford 2000 Championship	(Finland) JJ Lehto	
European Formula Ford Championship	(Denmark) Svend Hansen	1987 European Formula Ford Championship
Finnish Formula Ford Championship	(Finland) Mika Häkkinen	
German Formula Ford Championship	(Germany) Ellen Lohr	1987 German Formula Ford Championship
Formula Ford 1600 BRDC	(United Kingdom) Eddie Irvine	
Formula Ford Sweden Junior	(Finland) Mika Häkkinen	
Formula Ford 1600 Nordic Championship	(Finland) Mika Häkkinen	
New Zealand Formula Ford Championship	(New Zealand) Shane Higgins	1986–87 New Zealand Formula Ford Championship
Spanish Formula Ford Championship	(Spain) Antonio Albacete	
Swedish Formula Ford Championship	(Sweden) Michael Johansson	

== Rallying ==
Series	Driver/Co-Driver	Season article
World Rally Championship	(Finland) Juha Kankkunen	1987 World Rally Championship
World Rally Championship	Co-Drivers: (Finland) Juha Piironen	1987 World Rally Championship
World Rally Championship	Manufacturer: (Italy) Lancia	1987 World Rally Championship
FIA Cup for Production Cars	(Italy) Alex Fiorio (Italy) Luigi Pirollo	1987 World Rally Championship
African Rally Championship	(Ivory Coast) Alain Ambrosino	1987 African Rally Championship
Australian Rally Championship	(Australia) Greg Carr	1987 Australian Rally Championship
Australian Rally Championship	Co-Drivers: (Australia) Fred Gocentas	1987 Australian Rally Championship
British Rally Championship	(United Kingdom) Jimmy McRae	1987 British Rally Championship
British Rally Championship	Co-Drivers: (United Kingdom) Ian Grindrod	1987 British Rally Championship
Canadian Rally Championship	(Canada) Alain Bergeron	1987 Canadian Rally Championship
Canadian Rally Championship	Co-Drivers: (Canada) Martin Headland	1987 Canadian Rally Championship
Deutsche Rallye Meisterschaft	(Germany) Armin Schwarz	
Estonian Rally Championship	(Estonian Soviet Socialist Republic) Toomas Seger	1987 Estonian Rally Championship
Estonian Rally Championship	Co-Drivers: (Estonian Soviet Socialist Republic) Tiit Paju	1987 Estonian Rally Championship
European Rally Championship	(Italy) Dario Cerrato	1987 European Rally Championship
European Rally Championship	Co-Drivers: (Italy) Giuseppe Cerri	1987 European Rally Championship
Finnish Rally Championship	Group A: (Finland) Mikael Sundström	1987 Finnish Rally Championship
Finnish Rally Championship	Group 2: (Finland) Sakari Vierimaa	1987 Finnish Rally Championship
Finnish Rally Championship	Group B: (Finland) Petteri Lindström	1987 Finnish Rally Championship
French Rally Championship	(France) Didier Auriol	
Hungarian Rally Championship	(Hungary) László Ranga	
Hungarian Rally Championship	Co-Drivers: (Hungary) Mihály Dudás	
Italian Rally Championship	Group B: (Italy) Michele Rayneri	
Italian Rally Championship	Group B Co-Drivers: (Italy) Carlo Cassina	
Italian Rally Championship	Group B Manufacturers: (Italy) Lancia	
Italian Rally Championship	Group A: (Italy) Fabrizio Tabaton	
Italian Rally Championship	Group A Co-Drivers: (Italy) Luciano Tedeschini	
Italian Rally Championship	Group A Manufacturers: (Italy) Lancia	
Middle East Rally Championship	(United Arab Emirates) Mohammed Ben Sulayem	
New Zealand Rally Championship	(New Zealand) Tony Teesdale	1987 New Zealand Rally Championship
New Zealand Rally Championship	Co-Drivers: (New Zealand) Greg Horne	1987 New Zealand Rally Championship
Polish Rally Championship	(Poland) Marian Bublewicz	
Romanian Rally Championship	(Romania) Ludovic Balint	
Scottish Rally Championship	(United Kingdom) Murray Grierson	
Scottish Rally Championship	Co-Drivers: (United Kingdom) Roger Anderson	
South African National Rally Championship	(South Africa) Geoff Mortimer	
South African National Rally Championship	Co-Drivers: (South Africa) Franz Boshoff	
South African National Rally Championship	Manufacturers: (Japan) Nissan	
Spanish Rally Championship	(Spain) Carlos Sainz	
Spanish Rally Championship	Co-Drivers: (Spain) Antonio Boto	

=== Rallycross ===
Series	Driver	Season article
FIA European Rallycross Championship	Div 1: (Sweden) Per-Ove Davidsson	
FIA European Rallycross Championship	Div 2: (Finland) Seppo Niittymäki	
British Rallycross Championship	(United Kingdom) Mark Rennison	

== Sports car and GT ==
Series	Driver	Season article
World Sportscar Championship	C1: (Brazil) Raul Boesel	1987 World Sportscar Championship season
World Sportscar Championship	C1 Teams: (United Kingdom) Silk Cut Jaguar	1987 World Sportscar Championship season
World Sportscar Championship	C2: (United Kingdom) Gordon Spice; C2: (Spain) Fermín Vélez	1987 World Sportscar Championship season
World Sportscar Championship	C2 Teams: (United Kingdom) Spice Engineering	1987 World Sportscar Championship season
All Japan Sports Prototype Championship	(United Kingdom) Kenny Acheson (Japan) Kunimitsu Takahashi	1987 All Japan Sports Prototype Car Endurance Championship
All Japan Sports Prototype Championship	Manufacturers: (Germany) Porsche	1987 All Japan Sports Prototype Car Endurance Championship
IMSA GT Championship	GTP: (United States) Chip Robinson	1987 IMSA GT Championship season
IMSA GT Championship	Lights: (United States) Jim Downing	1987 IMSA GT Championship season
IMSA GT Championship	GTO: (United States) Chris Cord	1987 IMSA GT Championship season
IMSA GT Championship	GTU: (United States) Tommy Kendall	1987 IMSA GT Championship season
ADAC Supercup	(Germany) Hans-Joachim Stuck	1987 ADAC Supercup
ADAC Supercup	Teams: (Germany) Porsche AG	1987 ADAC Supercup
Australian Sports Car Championship	(Australia) Andy Roberts	1987 Australian Sports Car Championship
Porsche Supercup, Porsche Carrera Cup, GT3 Cup Challenge and Porsche Sprint Challenge
Porsche Carrera Cup France	(France) René Metge	1987 Porsche Carrera Cup France
Porsche 944 Turbo Cup	(Germany) Roland Asch	1987 Porsche 944 Turbo Cup
Porsche 944 Turbo Cup	Teams: (Germany) Max Moritz Racing Team	1987 Porsche 944 Turbo Cup

== Stock car ==
Series	Driver	Season article
NASCAR Winston Cup Series	(United States) Dale Earnhardt	1987 NASCAR Winston Cup Series
NASCAR Winston Cup Series	Manufacturers: (United States) Chevrolet	1987 NASCAR Winston Cup Series
NASCAR Busch Grand National Series	(United States) Larry Pearson	1987 NASCAR Busch Grand National Series
NASCAR Busch Grand National Series	Manufacturers: (United States) Chevrolet	1987 NASCAR Busch Grand National Series
NASCAR Busch North Series	(United States) Joey Kourafas	1987 NASCAR Busch North Series
NASCAR Winston West Series	(United States) Chad Little	1987 NASCAR Winston West Series
ARCA Bondo/Mar-Hyde Series	(United States) Bill Venturini	1987 ARCA Bondo/Mar-Hyde Series
International Race of Champions	(United States) Geoffrey Bodine	IROC XI
Turismo Carretera	(Argentina) Oscar Castellano	1987 Turismo Carretera

== Touring car ==
Series	Driver	Season article
World Touring Car Championship	(Italy) Roberto Ravaglia	1987 World Touring Car Championship season
European Touring Car Championship	(West Germany) Winni Vogt	1987 European Touring Car Championship
Australian Touring Car Championship	(New Zealand) Jim Richards	1987 Australian Touring Car Championship
Australian 2.0 Litre Touring Car Championship	(Australia) Mark Skaife	1987 Australian 2.0 Litre Touring Car Championship
British Touring Car Championship	(United Kingdom) Chris Hodgetts	1987 British Touring Car Championship
Campeonato Brasileiro de Marcas e Pilotos	(Brazil) Clemente Faria (Brazil) Vinicius Pimentel	1987 Campeonato Brasileiro de Marcas e Pilotos
Deutsche Tourenwagen Meisterschaft	(Belgium) Eric van de Poele	1987 Deutsche Tourenwagen Meisterschaft
Europa Cup Renault Alpine V6 Turbo	(Italy) Massimo Sigala	1987 Europa Cup Renault Alpine V6 Turbo
Finnish Touring Car Championship	(Finland) Leif Wiik	
French Touring Car Championship	(France) Érik Comas	
Italian Touring Car Championship	(Italy) Michele di Gioia	
Japanese Touring Car Championship	(Japan) Naoki Nagasaka	1987 Japanese Touring Car Championship
Japanese Touring Car Championship	JTC-2: (Japan) Haruto Yanagida	1987 Japanese Touring Car Championship
Japanese Touring Car Championship	JTC-3: (Japan) Osamu Nakako	1987 Japanese Touring Car Championship
New Zealand Touring Car Championship	(New Zealand) Glenn McIntyre	1987 New Zealand Touring Car Championship
Stock Car Brasil	(Brazil) Zeca Giaffone	1987 Stock Car Brasil season
TC2000 Championship	(Argentina) Silvio Oltra	1987 TC2000 Championship

== Truck racing ==
Series	Driver	Season article
European Truck Racing Championship	Class A: (United Kingdom) Rod Chapman	1987 European Truck Racing Championship
European Truck Racing Championship	Class B: (United Kingdom) George Allen	1987 European Truck Racing Championship
European Truck Racing Championship	Class C: (Sweden) Slim Borgudd	1987 European Truck Racing Championship

== See also ==
- List of motorsport championships
- Auto racing
