= 1985 in motorsport =

The following is an overview of the events of 1985 in motorsport including the major racing events, motorsport venues that were opened and closed during a year, championships and non-championship events that were established and disestablished in a year, and births and deaths of racing drivers and other motorsport people.

== Annual events ==
The calendar includes only annual major non-championship events or annual events that had significance separate from the championship. For the dates of the championship events see related season articles.

Date	Event	Ref
1–22 January	7th Dakar Rally	
2–3 February	23rd 24 Hours of Daytona	
17 February	27th Daytona 500	
19 May	43rd Monaco Grand Prix	
26 May	69th Indianapolis 500	
1–7 June	68th Isle of Man TT	
15–16 June	53rd 24 Hours of Le Mans	
22–23 June	13th 24 Hours of Nurburgring	
27–28 July	37th 24 Hours of Spa	
28 July	8th Suzuka 8 Hours	
6 October	26th James Hardie 1000	
24 November	32nd Macau Grand Prix	

== Established championships/events ==
First race	Championship	Ref
24 March	European Formula 3000 Championship	

== Births ==
Date	Month	Name	Nationality	Occupation	Note	Ref
7	January	Lewis Hamilton	British	Racing driver	Formula One World Champion (2008, 2014-2015, 2017-2020)	
9	March	Pastor Maldonado	Venezuelan	Racing driver	2012 Spanish Grand Prix winner.	
27	June	Nico Rosberg	German	Racing driver	Formula One World Champion (2016).	
25	July	Nelson Piquet Jr.	Brazilian	Racing driver	Formula E champion (2014–15).	
19	August	Tom Sykes	British	Motorcycle racer	Superbike World champion (2013).	
16	October	Casey Stoner	Australian	Motorcycle racer	MotoGP World champion (2007, 2011).	

== Deaths ==
Date	Month	Name	Age	Nationality	Occupation	Note	Ref
11	March	Lee Shepherd	40	American	Drag racer		
1	October	Ninian Sanderson	60	British	Racing driver	24 Hours of Le Mans winner (1956).	
8	November	Masten Gregory	53	American	Racing driver	24 Hours of Le Mans winner (1965).	
23	December	Birabongse Bhanudej	71	Thai	Racing driver	The first Thai Formula One driver.	
27	December	Jean Rondeau	39	French	Racing driver	24 Hours of Le Mans winner (1980).	

== See also ==
- List of 1985 motorsport champions
