= List of 1986 motorsport champions =

1986 motorsport champions
Previous: 1985	Next: 1987

This list of 1986 motorsport champions is a list of national or international auto racing series with a Championship decided by the points or positions earned by a driver from multiple races.

== Dirt oval racing ==
Series	Champion	Refer
World of Outlaws Sprint Car Series	(United States) Steve Kinser	
World of Outlaws Sprint Car Series	Teams: (United States) Karl Kinser Racing	

== Drag racing ==
Series	Champion	Refer
NHRA Winston Drag Racing Series	Top Fuel: (United States) Don Garlits	1986 NHRA Winston Drag Racing Series
NHRA Winston Drag Racing Series	Funny Car: (United States) Kenny Bernstein	1986 NHRA Winston Drag Racing Series
NHRA Winston Drag Racing Series	Pro Stock: (United States) Bob Glidden	1986 NHRA Winston Drag Racing Series

== Karting ==
Series	Driver	Season article
World Formula K Championship 135 cc	(Brazil) Augusto Ribas	
World Formula E SuperKart Championship 250 cc	(South Africa) Wade Nelson	
Juniors World Cup 125 cc	(Italy) Fabrizio De Simone	
CIK-FIA Karting European Championship	FK: (France) Yvan Muller	
CIK-FIA Karting European Championship	ICC: (Italy) Lamberto di Ferdinando	
CIK-FIA Karting European Championship	ICA: (Sweden) Linus Lundberg	

== Motorcycle ==
Series	Rider	Season article
500cc World Championship	(United States) Eddie Lawson	1986 Grand Prix motorcycle racing season
250cc World Championship	(Venezuela) Carlos Lavado	1986 Grand Prix motorcycle racing season
125cc World Championship	(Italy) Luca Cadalora	1986 Grand Prix motorcycle racing season
80cc World Championship	(Spain) Jorge Martínez	1986 Grand Prix motorcycle racing season
Speedway World Championship	(Denmark) Hans Nielsen	1986 Individual Speedway World Championship
AMA Superbike Championship	(United States) Fred Merkel	
Australian Superbike Series	(Australia) Malcolm Campbell	

== Open wheel racing ==
Series	Driver	Season article
FIA Formula One World Championship	(France) Alain Prost	1986 Formula One World Championship
FIA Formula One World Championship	Constructors: (United Kingdom) Williams-Honda	1986 Formula One World Championship
CART PPG Indy Car World Series	(United States) Bobby Rahal	1986 CART PPG Indy Car World Series
CART PPG Indy Car World Series	Manufacturers: (United Kingdom) Cosworth	1986 CART PPG Indy Car World Series
CART PPG Indy Car World Series	Rookies: (United States) Chip Robinson	1986 CART PPG Indy Car World Series
American Racing Series	(Italy) Fabrizio Barbazza	1986 American Racing Series season
Australian Drivers' Championship	(Australia) Graham Watson	1986 Australian Drivers' Championship
Formula Atlantic East Coast	(Canada) Scott Goodyear	1986 Formula Atlantic East Coast season
Formula Atlantic West Coast	(United States) Ted Prappas	1986 Formula Atlantic West Coast season
Barber Saab Pro Series	(United States) Willy Lewis	1986 Barber Saab Pro Series
Cup of Peace and Friendship	(Czechoslovakia) Václav Lim	1986 Cup of Peace and Friendship
Cup of Peace and Friendship	Nations: East Germany	1986 Cup of Peace and Friendship
SCCA Formula Super Vee	(Belgium) Didier Theys	1986 SCCA Formula Super Vee season
South African National Drivers Championship	(South Africa) Wayne Taylor	1986 South African National Drivers Championship
Formula Two
International Formula 3000	(Italy) Ivan Capelli	1986 International Formula 3000 Championship
All-Japan Formula Two Championship	(Japan) Satoru Nakajima	1986 Japanese Formula Two Championship
Australian Formula 2 Championship	(Australia) Jonathan Crooke	1986 Australian Formula 2 Championship
South American Formula Two Championship	(Argentina) Guillermo Maldonado	1986 South American Formula Two Championship
Formula Three
All-Japan Formula Three Championship	(Japan) Akio Morimoto	1986 All-Japan Formula Three Championship
All-Japan Formula Three Championship	Teams: (Japan) Team LeMans	1986 All-Japan Formula Three Championship
Austria Formula 3 Cup	(Austria) Franz Theuermann	1986 Austria Formula 3 Cup
British Formula Three Championship	(United Kingdom) Andy Wallace	1986 British Formula Three Championship
British Formula Three Championship	National: (United Kingdom) Steve Kempton	1986 British Formula Three Championship
Chilean Formula Three Championship	(Chile) Giuseppe Bacigalupo	1986 Chilean Formula Three Championship
Finnish Formula Three Championship	(Finland) Jorma Airaksinen	1986 Finnish Formula Three Championship
Finnish Formula Three Championship	Teams: (Finland) Bisse Racing	1986 Finnish Formula Three Championship
French Formula Three Championship	(France) Yannick Dalmas	
German Formula Three Championship	(Denmark) Kris Nissen	1986 German Formula Three Championship
Italian Formula Three Championship	(Italy) Nicola Larini	1986 Italian Formula Three Championship
Italian Formula Three Championship	Teams: (Italy) Coloni Racing	1986 Italian Formula Three Championship
Soviet Formula 3 Championship	(Soviet Union) Alexander Potekhin	1986 Soviet Formula 3 Championship
Swiss Formula Three Championship	(Switzerland) Gregor Foitek	
Formula Renault
French Formula Renault Championship	(France) Érik Comas	1986 French Formula Renault Championship
Formula Renault Argentina	(Argentina) Gabriel Furlán	1986 Formula Renault Argentina
Formula Ford
Australian Formula Ford Championship	(Australia) Warwick Rooklyn	1986 Motorcraft Formula Ford Driver to Europe Series
Brazilian Formula Ford Championship	(Brazil) Jefferson Elias	
British Formula Ford Championship	(United Kingdom) Jason Eliott	1986 British Formula Ford Championship
British Formula Ford 2000 Championship	(Belgium) Bertrand Gachot	
Danish Formula Ford Championship	(Denmark) Svend Hansen	
European Formula Ford Championship	(Finland) JJ Lehto	1986 European Formula Ford Championship
Finnish Formula Ford Championship	(Finland) JJ Lehto	
Formula Ford 2000 Europe	(United Kingdom) Mark Blundell	
German Formula Ford Championship	(Germany) Michael Bartels	1986 German Formula Ford Championship
Formula Ford 1600 Netherlands	(Netherlands) Jan Bokhoven	
Spanish Formula Ford Championship	(Spain) Antonio Albacete	1986 Spanish Formula Ford Championship
Formula Ford 1600 Sweden	(Sweden) Reine Andersson	
Formula Ford Junior Sweden	(Sweden) Kenny Bräck	
New Zealand Formula Ford Championship	(New Zealand) Craig Coleman	1985–86 New Zealand Formula Ford Championship
Scottish Formula Ford Championship	(United Kingdom) Cameron Binnie	

== Rallying ==
Series	Driver	Season article
World Rally Championship	(Finland) Juha Kankkunen	1986 World Rally Championship
World Rally Championship	Co-Drivers: (Finland) Juha Pirronen	1986 World Rally Championship
World Rally Championship	Manufacturers: (France) Peugeot	1986 World Rally Championship
African Rally Championship	(Ivory Coast) Alain Ambrosino	1986 African Rally Championship
Australian Rally Championship	(Australia) Barry Lowe	1986 Australian Rally Championship
Australian Rally Championship	Co-Drivers: (Australia) Kate Officer	1986 Australian Rally Championship
British Rally Championship	(United Kingdom) Mark Lovell	1986 British Rally Championship
British Rally Championship	Co-Drivers: (United Kingdom) Roger Freeman	1986 British Rally Championship
Canadian Rally Championship	(Canada) Bo Skowronnek	1986 Canadian Rally Championship
Canadian Rally Championship	Co-Drivers: (Canada) Terry Epp	1986 Canadian Rally Championship
Deutsche Rallye Meisterschaft	(France) Michèle Mouton	
Estonian Rally Championship	(Estonian Soviet Socialist Republic) Mihhail Orlov	1986 Estonian Rally Championship
Estonian Rally Championship	Co-Drivers: (Estonian Soviet Socialist Republic) Hannes Vares	1986 Estonian Rally Championship
European Rally Championship	(Italy) Fabrizio Tabaton	1986 European Rally Championship
European Rally Championship	Co-Drivers: (Italy) Luciano Tedeschini	1986 European Rally Championship
Finnish Rally Championship	Group A: (Finland) Risto Buri	1986 Finnish Rally Championship
Finnish Rally Championship	Group 2: (Finland) Kyösti Hämäläinen	1986 Finnish Rally Championship
Finnish Rally Championship	Group B: (Finland) Timo Heinonen	1986 Finnish Rally Championship
French Rally Championship	(France) Didier Auriol	
Hungarian Rally Championship	(Hungary) László Németh	
Hungarian Rally Championship	Co-Drivers: (Hungary) András Jójárt	
Italian Rally Championship	(Italy) Dario Cerrato	
Italian Rally Championship	Co-Drivers: (Italy) Giuseppe Cerri	
Italian Rally Championship	Manufacturers: (Italy) Lancia	
Italian Rally Championship	Open: (Italy) Dario Cerrato	
Italian Rally Championship	Open Co-Drivers: (Italy) Giuseppe Cerri	
Italian Rally Championship	Open Manufacturers: (Italy) Lancia	
Middle East Rally Championship	(United Arab Emirates) Mohammed Ben Sulayem	
New Zealand Rally Championship	(New Zealand) Neil Allport	1986 New Zealand Rally Championship
Polish Rally Championship	(Poland) Mariusz Kostrzak	
Romanian Rally Championship	(Romania) Ludovic Balint	
Scottish Rally Championship	(United Kingdom) Ken Wood	
Scottish Rally Championship	Co-Drivers: (United Kingdom) Peter Brown	
South African National Rally Championship	(South Africa) Hannes Grobler	
South African National Rally Championship	Co-Drivers: (South Africa) Piet Swanepoel	
South African National Rally Championship	Manufacturers: (Japan) Nissan	
Spanish Rally Championship	(Spain) Salvador Servia	
Spanish Rally Championship	Co-Drivers: (Spain) Victor Sabater	

=== Rallycross ===
Series	Driver	Season article
FIA European Rallycross Championship	Div 1: (Sweden) Anders Norstedt	
FIA European Rallycross Championship	Div 2: (Sweden) Olle Arnesson	
British Rallycross Championship	(United Kingdom) John Welch	

== Sports car and GT ==
Series	Driver	Season article
World Sports Prototype Championship	C1: (United Kingdom) Derek Bell	1986 World Sportscar Championship season
World Sports Prototype Championship	C1 Teams: (Switzerland) Brun Motorsport	1986 World Sportscar Championship season
World Sports Prototype Championship	C2: (United Kingdom) Gordon Spice; C2: (United Kingdom) Ray Bellm	1986 World Sportscar Championship season
World Sports Prototype Championship	C2 Teams: (United Kingdom) Ecurie Ecosse	1986 World Sportscar Championship season
IMSA GT Championship	GTP: (United States) Al Holbert	1986 IMSA GT Championship season
IMSA GT Championship	Lights: (United States) Jim Downing	1986 IMSA GT Championship season
IMSA GT Championship	GTO: (United States) Scott Pruett	1986 IMSA GT Championship season
IMSA GT Championship	GTU: (United States) Tommy Kendall	1986 IMSA GT Championship season
ADAC Supercup	(Germany) Hans-Joachim Stuck	1986 ADAC Supercup
ADAC Supercup	Teams: (Germany) Blaupunkt Joest Racing	1986 ADAC Supercup
All Japan Endurance Championship	(Japan) Kunimitsu Takahashi	1986 All Japan Endurance Championship
All Japan Endurance Championship	Manufacturers: (Germany) Porsche	1986 All Japan Endurance Championship
Australian Sports Car Championship	(Australia) John Bowe	1986 Australian Sports Car Championship
Porsche 944 Turbo Cup	(Germany) Joachim Winkelhock	1986 Porsche 944 Turbo Cup
Porsche 944 Turbo Cup	Teams: (Germany) Winkelhock Motorsport	1986 Porsche 944 Turbo Cup

== Stock car racing ==
Series	Driver	Season article
NASCAR Winston Cup Series	(United States) Dale Earnhardt	1986 NASCAR Winston Cup Series
NASCAR Winston Cup Series	Manufacturers: (United States) Chevrolet	1986 NASCAR Winston Cup Series
NASCAR Busch Grand National Series	(United States) Larry Pearson	1986 NASCAR Busch Grand National Series
NASCAR Busch Grand National Series	Manufacturers: (United States) Pontiac	1986 NASCAR Busch Grand National Series
NASCAR Winston West Series	(United States) Hershel McGriff	1986 NASCAR Winston West Series
ARCA Bondo/Mar-Hyde Series	(United States) Lee Raymond	1986 ARCA Bondo/Mar-Hyde Series
Turismo Carretera	(Argentina) Oscar Angeletti	1986 Turismo Carretera

== Touring car ==
Series	Driver	Season article
FIA Touring Car Championship	(Italy) Roberto Ravaglia	1986 European Touring Car Championship
Australian Touring Car Championship	(New Zealand) Robbie Francevic	1986 Australian Touring Car Championship
Australian 2.0 Litre Touring Car Championship	(Australia) John Smith	1986 Australian 2.0 Litre Touring Car Championship
Australian Endurance Championship	(New Zealand) Jim Richards	1986 Australian Endurance Championship
British Saloon Car Championship	(United Kingdom) Chris Hodgetts	1986 British Saloon Car Championship
Campeonato Brasileiro de Marcas e Pilotos	(Brazil) Armando Balbi (Brazil) Xandy Negrão	1986 Campeonato Brasileiro de Marcas e Pilotos
Deutsche Tourenwagen Meisterschaft	(Denmark) Kurt Thiim	1986 Deutsche Tourenwagen Meisterschaft
Europa Cup Renault Alpine V6 Turbo	(Italy) Massimo Sigala	1986 Europa Cup Renault Alpine V6 Turbo
French Supertouring Championship	(France) Xavier Lapeyre	
Japanese Touring Car Championship	(Japan) Aguri Suzuki	1986 Japanese Touring Car Championship
Japanese Touring Car Championship	JTC-2: (Japan) Yoshinari Takasugi	1986 Japanese Touring Car Championship
Japanese Touring Car Championship	JTC-3: (Japan) Kaoru Ito	1986 Japanese Touring Car Championship
New Zealand Touring Car Championship	(New Zealand) Graeme Bowkett	
South Pacific Touring Car Championship	(Australia) Allan Grice	
AMSCAR Series	(Australia) Tony Longhurst	
Stock Car Brasil	(Brazil) Marcos Gracia	1986 Stock Car Brasil season
TC2000 Championship	(Argentina) Juan María Traverso	1986 TC2000 Championship

== Truck racing ==
Series	Driver	Season article
European Truck Racing Championship	Class A: (United Kingdom) Mel Lindsay	1986 European Truck Racing Championship
European Truck Racing Championship	Class B: (Sweden) Slim Borgudd	1986 European Truck Racing Championship
European Truck Racing Championship	Class C: (Sweden) Curt Göransson	1986 European Truck Racing Championship

== See also ==
- List of motorsport championships
- Auto racing
