= 1984 European Rallycross Championship =

FIA European Rallycross Championship season

Seasons
- ← 1983 1985 →

The 1984 European Rallycross Championship season was the ninth season of the FIA European Rallycross Championship under that name and the twelfth season overall since it began as the Embassy/ERA European Rallycross Championship. It was held across nine rounds starting at the Nordring in Austria on April 8 and ending at the Lyngås Motorbane in Norway on October 7.

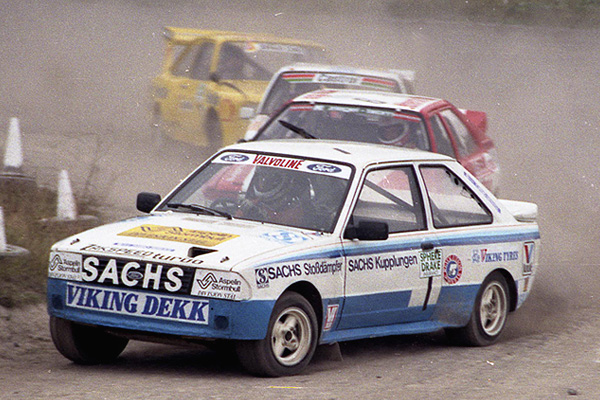
Martin Schanche at the British round of the championship

The champions were Anders Norstedt (Division 1) and Martin Schanche (Division 2). Schanche won six of the nine rounds on the Division 2 schedule to guarantee himself the title. In Division 1 Norstedt had an equal number of wins to his closest title rival Lars Nyström. The highest placed driver with no wins in any class was Olle Arnesson, the Division 2 third-placer.

== Calendar ==
Round	Date	Venue	City	Country	Winner (Div 1)	Winner (Div 2)
1	April 8	Nordring	Fuglau	Austria	(Norway) Egil Stenshagen	(Austria) Andy Bentza
2	May 13	Ring Knutstorp	Kågeröd	Sweden	(Sweden) Anders Norstedt	(Austria) Walter Mayer
3	May 20	Ahvenisto Race Circuit	Hämeenlinna	Finland	(Sweden) Lars Nyström	(Norway) Martin Schanche
4	June 24	Circuit Copreco	St. Junien	France	(Sweden) Anders Norstedt	(Norway) Martin Schanche
5	August 12	Glossocircuit	Arendonk	Belgium	(Sweden) Lars Nyström	(Norway) Martin Schanche
6	August 19	Eurocircuit	Valkenswaard	Netherlands	(Sweden) Lars Nyström	(Norway) Martin Schanche
7	September 15	Lydden Circuit	Wootton	United Kingdom	(Sweden) Håkan Ivarsson	(Finland) Seppo Niittymäki
8	September 15	Estering	Buxtehude	Germany	(Sweden) Anders Norstedt	(Norway) Martin Schanche
9	October 7	Lyngås Motorbane	Tranby i Lier	Norway	(Norway) Bjørn Skogstad	(Norway) Martin Schanche

== Standings ==
=== Div. 1 ===
Pos	Driver	(Austria)	(Sweden)	(Finland)	(France)	(Belgium)	(Netherlands)	(United Kingdom)	(Germany)	(Norway)	Pts
1	(Sweden) Anders Norstedt	15	20	17	20	17	17	7.5	20	17	150.5
2	(Sweden) Lars Nyström	2	13	20	11	20	20	8.5	17	2	113.5
3	(Norway) Bjørn Skogstad	6	9	8	13	10	11	6	13	20	96
4	(Norway) Ludvig Hunsbedt	17		5	15	11	12	6.5	11	3	80.5
5	(Sweden) Håkan Ivarsson		12	15		6	15	10	15	7	80
6	(Norway) Steinar Jøranli	13	15	9	9	1	9	4	6	11	77
7	(Norway) Knut Boberg	10	17	12	2	7		3.5	4	9	64.5
8	(Norway) Erik Hansen	12		13		15			7	10	57
9	(Norway) Kai Viggo Brateng	3	10	10	8	2	13	5	5		56
10	(Norway) Nils-Tore Johnson	11		1		9	10	4.5	12	6	53.5

== Drivers ==
=== Div. 2 ===
Constructor	Car	No.	Driver
Audi	Audi Quattro	2	(Austria) Andy Bentza
Audi	Audi Quattro	4	(Sweden) Olle Arnesson
Audi	Audi Quattro	6	(Austria) Walter Mayer
Audi	Audi Quattro	10	(Norway) Terje Schie
Audi	Audi Quattro	80	(Cyprus) Dimi Mavropoulos
Ford	Ford Escort	1	(Norway) Martin Schanche
Ford	Ford Escort	7	(Norway) Kjetil Bolneset
Ford	Ford Escort	22	(United Kingdom) John Welch
Ford	Ford Escort	31	(United Kingdom) Trevor Hopkins
Ford	Ford Capri	23	(United Kingdom) Tony Proctor
Ford	Ford Fiesta	83	(United Kingdom) Barry Hathaway
Porsche	Porsche 911	4	(Finland) Seppo Niittymäki
Porsche	Porsche 911	5	(Sweden) Rolf Nilsson
Porsche	Porsche 911	8	(Finland) Matti Alamäki
Porsche	Porsche 911	40	(Norway) Geir Asbjørnsen
Porsche	Porsche 911	75	(United Kingdom) Rob Gibson
Talbot-Matra	Talbot-Matra Murena	44	(Belgium) Luc Noyen
