= Martin Schanche =

Norwegian former racing driver and politician

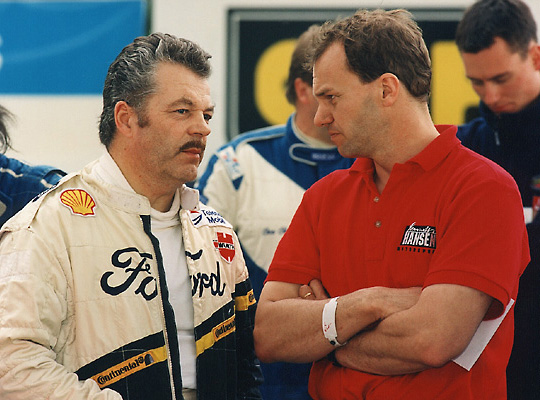
- 1998: Martin Schanche (left) and his long time arch-rival Swede Kenneth Hansen
- Nationality: (Norway) Norwegian
- Born: 1 January 1945 (age 81) Trondheim

FIA ERX Division 1 (1997–2010) Championship
- Years active: 1997–2001
- Former teams: Martin Schanche Racing
- Starts: 46
- Wins: 8
- Podiums: 15
- Best finish: 3rd in 1997, 1998

FIA ERX Division 2 (1982–1996) Championship
- Years active: 1982–1996
- Former teams: Martin Schanche Racing
- Starts: 134
- Championships: 3 (1984, 1991, 1995)
- Wins: 51
- Podiums: 76

FIA ERX TC Division Championship
- Years active: 1979–1981
- Former teams: Martin Schanche Racing
- Starts: 30
- Championships: 2 (1979, 1981)
- Wins: 11
- Podiums: 19

FIA European Rallycross Cup
- Years active: 1977–1978
- Former teams: Martin Schanche Racing
- Starts: 13
- Championships: 1 (1978)
- Wins: 4
- Podiums: 8

24 Hours of Le Mans career
- Years: 1985–1988
- Teams: Strandell Porsche, Team Lucky Strike Schanche Racing
- Best finish: 25th 1988
- Class wins: 0

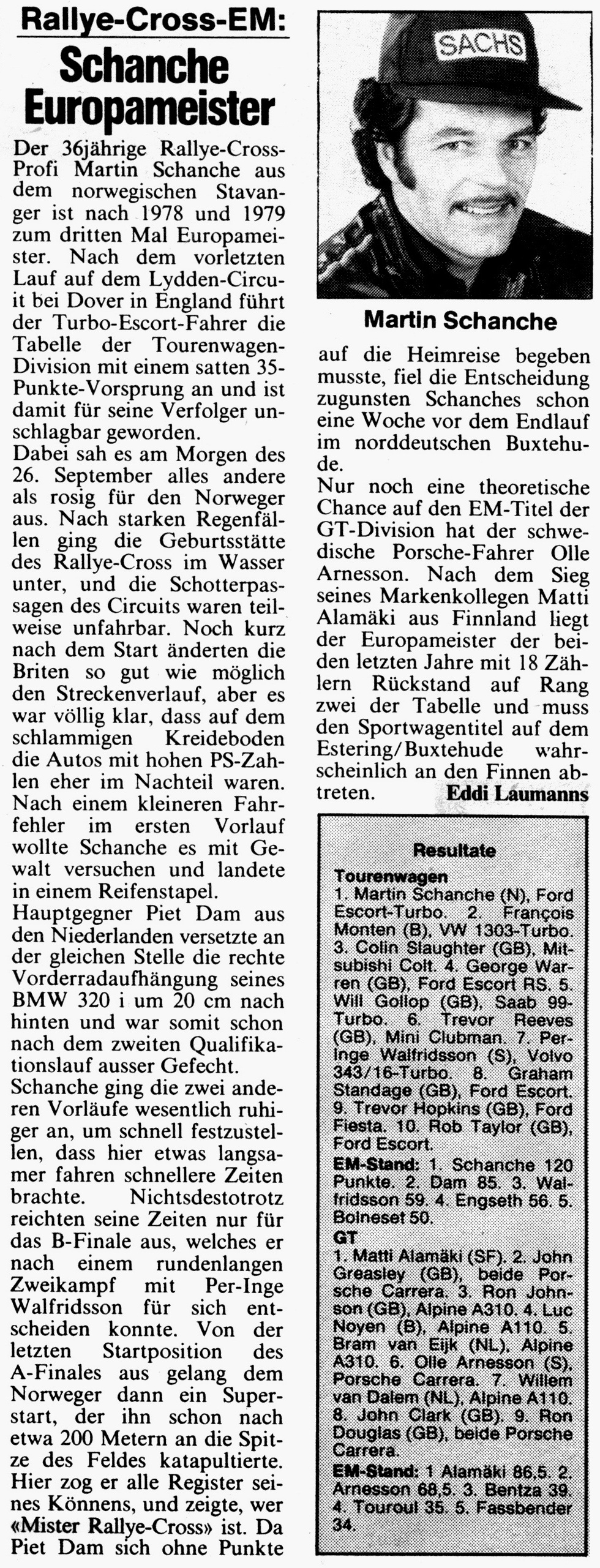
1981: The first public mentioning of the nickname "Mister Rallycross"

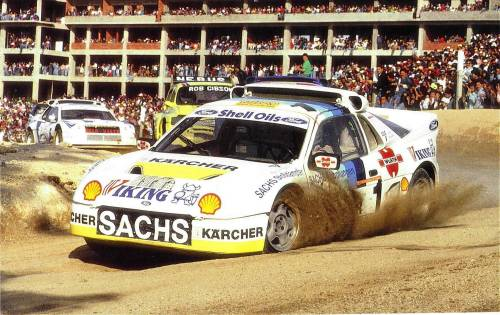
1992: Schanche in his Ford RS200 E2 en route to victory in Portugal

Martin Schanche (born 1 January 1945), nicknamed "Mr. Rallycross", is a Norwegian former racing driver and politician.

== Biography ==
Schanche was born in Trondheim, as the son of a German WW2 airplane pilot, who lost his life in a plane crash only three months later, and a Norwegian mother. The little boy grew up as an adopted child of a Norwegian couple at the tiny village of Leirpollskogen in Tana Municipality, the most northern part of Norway. Today he lives in Drøbak, together with his German-born wife Birgit and their daughter Melissa, a Norwegian Weightlifting Champion of the categories for females. Schanche has also two other children from a former marriage, a daughter by the name of Elisabeth, and a son named Martin junior, well known in the Norwegian rallying scene.

Schanche started his racing career rather late, only in 1972 when he was already 27 years old. Due to his attacking driving style, he was quickly nicknamed "Villmannen fra Tana" ("The Wild Man from Tana") by his fellow Norwegian competitors. In 1975, he won a silver medal in the Norwegian Ice Racing Championships. Between 1976 and 2001, he competed in Rallycross, and became the FIA European champion of 1978, 1979, 1981, 1984, 1991 and 1995, as well as the vice-champion for another eight years. With his 74 main category wins, Schanche is still yet the undisputed record holder concerning the amount of overall victories in rounds counting towards the FIA European Championships for Rallycross Drivers. Beside his rallycross campaigns and four World Sports Car seasons he was a starter of the 1980 Rally Sweden, the 1982 Rally of Great Britain, and failed to set a new track record in the 1984 Pikes Peak International Hill Climb (PPIHC), due to a flat right front tyre.

Since retiring from motorsport, Schanche has embarked on a second career as a politician in Frogn Municipality for the Progress Party. In 2003, he was the subject of a lot of nationwide attention after he slapped the chin of his political opponent Torgeir Micaelsen of the Labour Party at the end of a school debate in Drammen because Micaelsen, during the debate and in front of the public, had called him a coward. That attention made him an often imitated character in Norwegian radio. As of 2006, he also has been working as a consultant for Prodrive on the work of Subarus WRC-cars. While active in rallycross, Schanche himself engineered transmissions and differentials for his cars. His company later on manufactured parts and modified parts for rally- and rallycross-cars. Nowadays, Schanche is working on projects with concepts for new combustion-engines (see External links section below).

Schanche is holder of a helicopter license and has operated his own helicopters. In 2000, he was involved in a crash in which his daughter was slightly injured.

== Racing record ==
Key: DSQ = excluded from whole event; DNS = did not start; NC = not classified for points; SUS = suspended; ( ) = dropped score, due to championship rules

=== Complete FIA European Rallycross Cup results ===
Year	Entrant	Car	1	2	3	4	5	6	7	8	9	10	11	ERC	Points
1977	Martin Schanche Racing	Ford Escort RS 1800	AUT1; DNS	NED1; DNS	ITA; DSQ	SWE1; DNS	FIN; NC	BEL1; NC	SWE2; DNS	NED2; DNS	BEL2; DNS	GER; 3	AUT2; DNS	18th	12
1978	Martin Schanche Racing	Ford Escort RS 1800	AUT; 6	ITA; 2	SWE; 2	FIN; NC	BEL; 1	NED; 1	FRA; 1	GBR; 1	GER; 2			1st	131

=== Complete FIA European Rallycross Championship results ===
==== TC Division ====
Year	Entrant	Car	1	2	3	4	5	6	7	8	9	10	11	ERX	Points
1979	Martin Schanche Racing	Ford Escort RS 1800	AUT; 2	ITA; 3	FIN; 4	SWE; 5	FRA; 1	BEL; 1	NED; 4	GBR; 1	GER; 2			1st	130
1980	Martin Schanche Racing	Ford Escort RS 1800	AUT; 16	ITA; 1	SWE; 1	FIN; 3	DEN; 5	BEL; 3	NED; 1	NOR; 5	GBR; 3	FRA; 6	GER; 1	2nd	138
1981	Martin Schanche Racing	Ford Escort RS 1800 Turbo	AUT; NC	SWE; 2	FIN; 1	DEN; 2	BEL; 11	NED; 1	FRA; 1	NOR; 4	GBR; 1	GER; 10		1st	121

==== Division 2 ====
Year	Entrant	Car	1	2	3	4	5	6	7	8	9	10	11	12	ERX	Points
1982	Martin Schanche Racing	Ford Escort RS 1800 Turbo	AUT; 7	SWE; 6	FIN; 3	FRA; 9	BEL; 6	NED; 1	NOR; 1	GBR; 1	GER; 3				2nd	102
1983	Martin Schanche Racing	Ford Escort RS 1800 Turbo	AUT; 10	SWE; 1	FIN; NC	FRA; 5	BEL; 3	NED; 1	NOR; 5	GBR; NC					4th	69
1984	Martin Schanche Racing	Ford Escort XR3 Turbo	AUT; 5	SWE; 2	FIN; 1	FRA; 1	BEL; 1	NED; 1	GBR; NC	GER; 1	NOR; 1				1st	149
1985	Martin Schanche Racing	Ford Escort XR3 Turbo	AUT; 6	FIN; 6	SWE; 6	FRA; 2	BEL; 2	NOR; 1	GBR; 1	GER; 1	NED; 6				2nd	138
1986	Martin Schanche Racing	Ford Escort XR3 Turbo	AUT; 7	FIN; 1	FRA; 1	BEL; 4	NED; 1	NOR; 1	GBR; NC	GER; DNS	SWE; 6				2nd	114
1987	Martin Schanche Racing	Ford RS200 E2	AUT; NC	SWE; DNS	FIN; NC	ESP; NC	FRA; 12	IRE; DNS	BEL; 1	NED; 1	NOR; 22	GBR; 1	GER; 4		6th	78
1988	Martin Schanche Racing	Ford RS200 E2	ESP; 5	AUT; 2	SWE (DSQ)	FIN (7)	IRE; 2	FRA; 6	BEL; 1	NED (10)	NOR (6)	GBR; 1	GER; 5		2nd	109
1989	Martin Schanche Racing	Ford RS200 E2	ESP (3)	AUT; 1	SWE (6)	FiN; 2	IRE; 2	FRA; 1	BEL; 2	NED; 2	NOR (6)	GBR (9)	GER; 2		2nd	125
1990	Martin Schanche Racing	Ford RS200 E2	AUT (6)	SWE; 4	FIN; 2	IRE; 3	FRA (6)	BEL; 1	NED; 1	NOR (11)	GER; 1	GBR; 1			2nd	125
1991	Martin Schanche Racing	Ford RS200 E2	POR; 1	AUT; 1	FIN; 1	FRA (2)	IRE (DSQ)	SWE (6)	BEL (6)	NED; 1	NOR; 1	GBR; 1	GER; 1		1st	140
1992	Martin Schanche Racing	Ford RS200 E2	GBR; 1	AUT; DNS	POR; 1	FIN; DSQ	SWE; SUS	FRA; SUS	IRE; SUS	BEL; NC	NED; 5	NOR; 1	GER; 1		4th	92
1993	Martin Schanche Racing	Ford Escort RS2000 T16	AUT; 3	POR; 6	FRA (NC)	IRE; 5	SWE (NC)	FIN; DNS	BEL; 1	NED; 6	NOR; 4	GER; 3			5th	90
1994	Martin Schanche Racing	Ford Escort RS2000 T16	AUT (16)	POR; 2	FRA; 2	IRE; 3	GBR; 1	SWE (5)	FIN; 1	BEL; 4	NED; 1	NOR (6)	GER (5)		2nd	122
1995	Martin Schanche Racing	Ford Escort RS2000 T16	AUT (DSQ)	POR (6)	FRA; 1	SWE; 2	GBR; 2	IRE (3)	BEL; 1	NED; 1	NOR; 1	FIN; 1	CZE; 1	GER (6)	1st	154
1996	Martin Schanche Racing	Ford Escort RS2000 T16	AUT; 7	POR; 7	FRA; 15	SWE; DNS	IRE; DNS	GBR (NC)	BEL; 9	NED (NC)	NOR; 4	CZE; 1	GER; 4		9th	76

==== Division 1^{*} ====
Year	Entrant	Car	1	2	3	4	5	6	7	8	9	10	ERX	Points
1997	Martin Schanche Racing	Ford Escort RS2000 T16	AUT; 1	FRA; 1	POR; 5	GBR; DSQ	SWE (6)	FIN; 1	BEL (NC)	NOR; 1	CZE (6)	GER; 3	3rd	107
1998	Martin Schanche Racing	Ford Escort RS2000 T16	AUT; 4	POR (6)	FRA; 3	SWE; 3	GBR; DNS	FIN; 1	BEL; 2	NOR (5)	GER; 1	CZE; 4	3rd	113
1999	Martin Schanche Racing	Opel Astra G T16	CZE; DNS	FRA (NC)	POR; 7	SWE; 15	FIN; 11	BEL; 12	NED; 10	NOR; 9	GER; NC		11th	38
2000	Martin Schanche Racing	Opel Astra G T16	POR; 5	FRA; 5	CZE (NC)	SWE; 7	BEL (NC)	NED; 6	NOR; 1	POL; 4	GER; 5		5th	90
2001	Martin Schanche Racing	Opel Astra G T16	FRA (5)	POR; 2	AUT (6)	CZE; 1	SWE; 4	BEL; 2	NED; 5	NOR; 3	POL (7)	GER (10)	4th	94

^{*} Division 2 was rebranded as Division 1 in 1997.

=== Complete 24 Hours of Le Mans results ===
Year	Class	No	Tyres	Car	Team	Co-Drivers	Laps	Pos.	Class Pos.
1985	C2	97	A	Strandell 85; Porsche Type-934 3.3 L Turbo Flat-6	(Sweden) Strandell Porsche	(Sweden) Stanley Dickens	-	DNS	DNS
1986	C2	89	G	Argo JM19; Zakspeed 1.8L Turbo I4	(Norway) Team Lucky Strike Schanche Racing	(Republic of Ireland) Martin Birrane (Norway) Torgjer Kleppe	1	DNF	DNF
1987	C2	117	G	Argo JM19B; Zakspeed 1.8L Turbo I4	(Norway) Team Lucky Strike Schanche Racing	(United Kingdom) Will Hoy (United Kingdom) Robin Smith	5	DNF	DNF
1988	C1	117	G	Argo JM19C; Ford Cosworth DFL 3.3L V8	(Norway) Team Lucky Strike Schanche Racing	(United Kingdom) Robin Smith (United Kingdom) Robin Donovan	278	25	16

== Publications ==
- Martin Schanche, by Sverre Amundsen, Racing Revyen 1979, 126 pages, Norwegian language, ISBN 82-990531-0-2.
- Martin Schanche – i fyr og flamme, by Rolf Nordberg, Cappelens Forlag 1981, 136 pages, Norwegian language, ISBN 82-02-09490-9.
- Martin – så glad, så sint, så fort…, by Sverre Inge Apenes, Godbok 1986, 158 pages, Norwegian language, ISBN 82-7398-000-6.
- Martin – Historien han aldri har fortalt, by Asle T. Johansen, Fri Flyt AS 2016, 240 pages, Norwegian language, ISBN 978-82-93090-46-5.

Sporting positions
Preceded by None	European Rallycross Touring Car Cup Champion; 1978	Succeeded by None
Preceded by None	European Rallycross Touring Car Champion; 1979	Succeeded by Per-Inge Walfridsson
Preceded by Per-Inge Walfridsson	European Rallycross Touring Car Division Champion; 1981	Succeeded by None
Preceded by Olle Arnesson	European Rallycross Division 2 Champion; 1984	Succeeded by Matti Alamäki
Preceded by Matti Alamäki	European Rallycross Division 2 Champion; 1991	Succeeded by Will Gollop
Preceded by Kenneth Hansen	European Rallycross Division 2 Champion; 1995	Succeeded by Kenneth Hansen
