= 1985 European Rallycross Championship =

FIA European Rallycross Championship season

Seasons
- ← 1984 1986 →

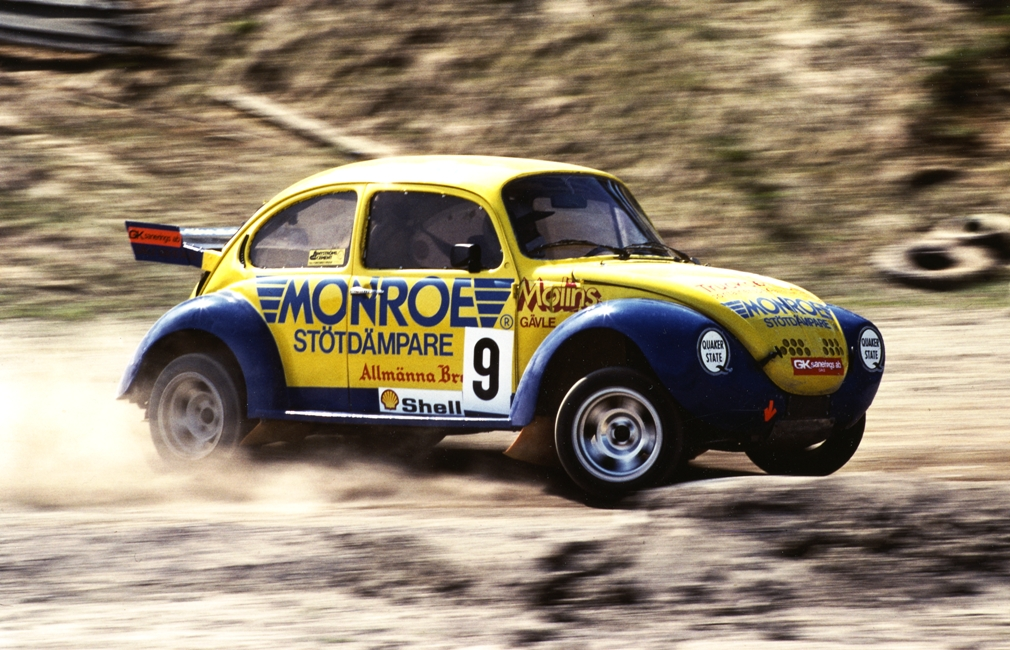
Mikael Nördstrom at the Finnish round of the championship

The 1985 European Rallycross Championship season was the tenth season of the FIA European Rallycross Championship under that name and the thirteenth season overall since it began as the Embassy/ERA European Rallycross Championship. It was held across nine rounds starting at the Thermoton-Ring in Austria on March 31 and ending at the Eurocircuit in the Netherlands on October 13.

The champions were Anders Norstedt (Division 1) who defended his title and Matti Alamäki (Division 2).

== Calendar ==
Round	Date	Venue	City	Country	Winner (Div 1)	Winner (Div 2)
1	March 31	Thermoton-Ring	Melk	Austria	(Austria) Friedrich Hainz	(Sweden) Olle Arnesson
2	May 19	Ahvenisto Race Circuit	Hämeenlinna	Finland	(Norway) Audun Ove Olsen	(Finland) Matti Alamäki
3	May 26	Svampabanan	Tomelilla	Sweden	(Sweden) Anders Norstedt	(Sweden) Olle Arnesson
4	June 23	Circuit de Marville	Marville	France	(Finland) Jouko Kallio	(Finland) Matti Alamäki
5	August 11	Duivelsbergcircuit	Maasmechelen	Belgium	(Sweden) Anders Norstedt	(Finland) Matti Alamäki
6	September 8	Lyngås Motorbane	Tranby i Lier	Norway	(Sweden) Anders Norstedt	(Norway) Martin Schanche
7	September 21	Lydden Circuit	Wootton	United Kingdom	(United Kingdom) Trevor Reeves	(Norway) Martin Schanche
8	October 6	Estering	Buxtehude	Germany	(Sweden) Anders Norstedt	(Norway) Martin Schanche
9	October 13	Eurocircuit	Valkenswaard	Netherlands	(Sweden) Lars Nyström	(Finland) Matti Alamäki

== Drivers ==
=== Div.1 ===
Constructor	Car	Driver
Opel	Opel Ascona i2000	
Opel	Opel Ascona i2000	(Finland) Risto Buri
Opel	Opel Ascona i2000	(Denmark) Jens Jacob Dynesen
Opel	Opel Ascona i2000	(Norway) Trond Engebretsen
Opel	Opel Ascona i2000	(Finland) Juhani Lammila
Opel	Opel Ascona i2000	(Finland) Kari Pihlas
Opel	Opel Ascona i2000	(Belgium) Jacques Putzeys
Opel	Opel Ascona i2000	(Norway) Roger Sandberg
Opel	Opel Ascona i2000	(Norway) Bjørn Skogstad
Opel	Opel Ascona i2000	(Finland) Hannu Wallinheim
Opel	Opel Ascona 2.0 SR	(Austria) Tino Ranftl
Opel	Opel Kadett D GT/E	(Germany) Hermann Stoß

=== Div. 2 ===
Constructor	Car	Driver
Audi	Audi Quattro	
Audi	Audi Quattro	(France) Jacques Aïta
Audi	Audi Quattro	(Sweden) Olle Arnesson
Audi	Audi Quattro	(Austria) Andy Bentza
Audi	Audi Quattro	(Norway) Jan Hroar Bjørklund
Audi	Audi Quattro	(Finland) Timo Virtanen
Audi	Audi Quattro 20V	
Audi	Audi Quattro 20V	(Norway) Kjetil Bolneset
Audi	Audi Quattro 20V	(Belgium) François Monten
Audi	Audi 80 Quattro Turbo	(Austria) Reneé Vontsina
Audi	Audi 80 GTE	(Germany) Sepp Gröbner
Ford	Ford Escort XR3 Turbo 4x4	(Norway) Martin Schanche
Volkswagen	Volkswagen 1303 S Turbo 4x4	(Norway) Kjell Aaen
Volkswagen	Volkswagen 1303 S Turbo 4x4	(Sweden) Stig Emilsson
Volkswagen	Volkswagen 1303 S Turbo 4x4	(Norway) Thor Holm
Volkswagen	Volkswagen 1303 S Turbo 4x4	(Finland) Jarmo Lähteenmäki
Volkswagen	Volkswagen 1303 S Turbo 4x4	(Sweden) Mikael Nördstrom
Volkswagen	Volkswagen 1303 S Turbo 4x4	(Finland) Leif Nyvall
Volkswagen	Volkswagen 1303 S Turbo 4x4	(Sweden) Örjan Wahlund

== Standings ==
=== Div 1 ===
Pos	Driver	(Austria)	(Finland)	(Sweden)	(France)	(Belgium)	(Norway)	(United Kingdom)	(Germany)	(Netherlands)	Pts
1	(Sweden) Anders Norstedt	15	15	20	3	20	20	8.5	20	17	138.5
2	(Sweden) Lars Nyström	13	11	13	8	15	15	6	15	20	116
3	(Norway) Bjørn Skogstad	6	17	15	10	13	10	5	12	15	103
