= Spice SE90C =

Sports prototype race car

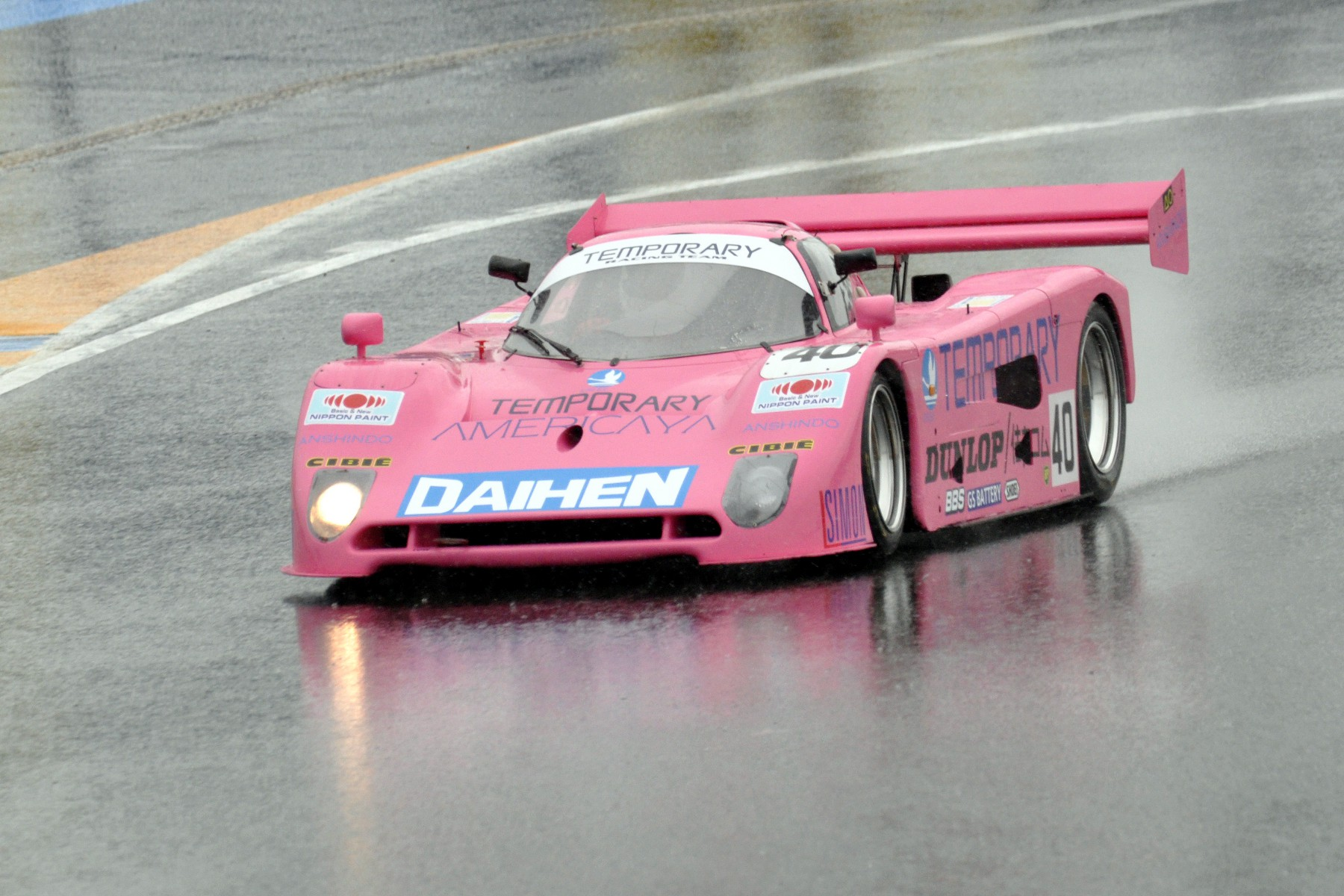
- Category: Group C1; Group C2
- Designer(s): Graham Humphrys

Technical specifications
- Chassis: Aluminum honeycomb monocoque covered in carbon fiber composite and kevlar body
- Suspension (front): double wishbones, coil springs over shock absorbers, anti-roll bar
- Suspension (rear): double wishbones, rocker-actuated coil springs over shock absorbers, anti-roll bar
- Length: 4,720 mm (186 in)
- Width: 1,920 mm (76 in)
- Height: 1,028 mm (40 in)
- Axle track: 1,490 mm (59 in) (front); 1,475 mm (58 in)
- Wheelbase: 2,720 mm (107 in)
- Engine: Ford-Cosworth DFL/DFZ 3.3–3.9 L (201.4–238.0 cu in) 90° V8 DOHC naturally-aspirated mid-engined Chevrolet 6.3 L (384.4 cu in) 90° V8 OHV naturally-aspirated mid-engined Ferrari 3.0 L (183.1 cu in) 90° V8 DOHC twin-turbocharged mid-engined Acura 3.0–3.5 L (183.1–213.6 cu in) 60° V6 DOHC naturally-aspirated mid-engined
- Transmission: Hewland DCB 5-speed manual
- Power: 425–800 hp (317–597 kW)
- Weight: 750 kg (1,653 lb)
- Brakes: AP Racing brake discs
- Tires: Avon; Goodyear

Competition history
- Debut: 1990 480 km of Suzuka
Entries	Wins	Podiums	Poles
102	0	6	0

The Spice SE90C is a Group C1 and Group C2 sports prototype race car, designed, developed, and built by British manufacturer, Spice Engineering, for sports car racing in the World Sportscar Championship and IMSA GTP Championship, in 1990.
