= Spice Engineering =

British racing team

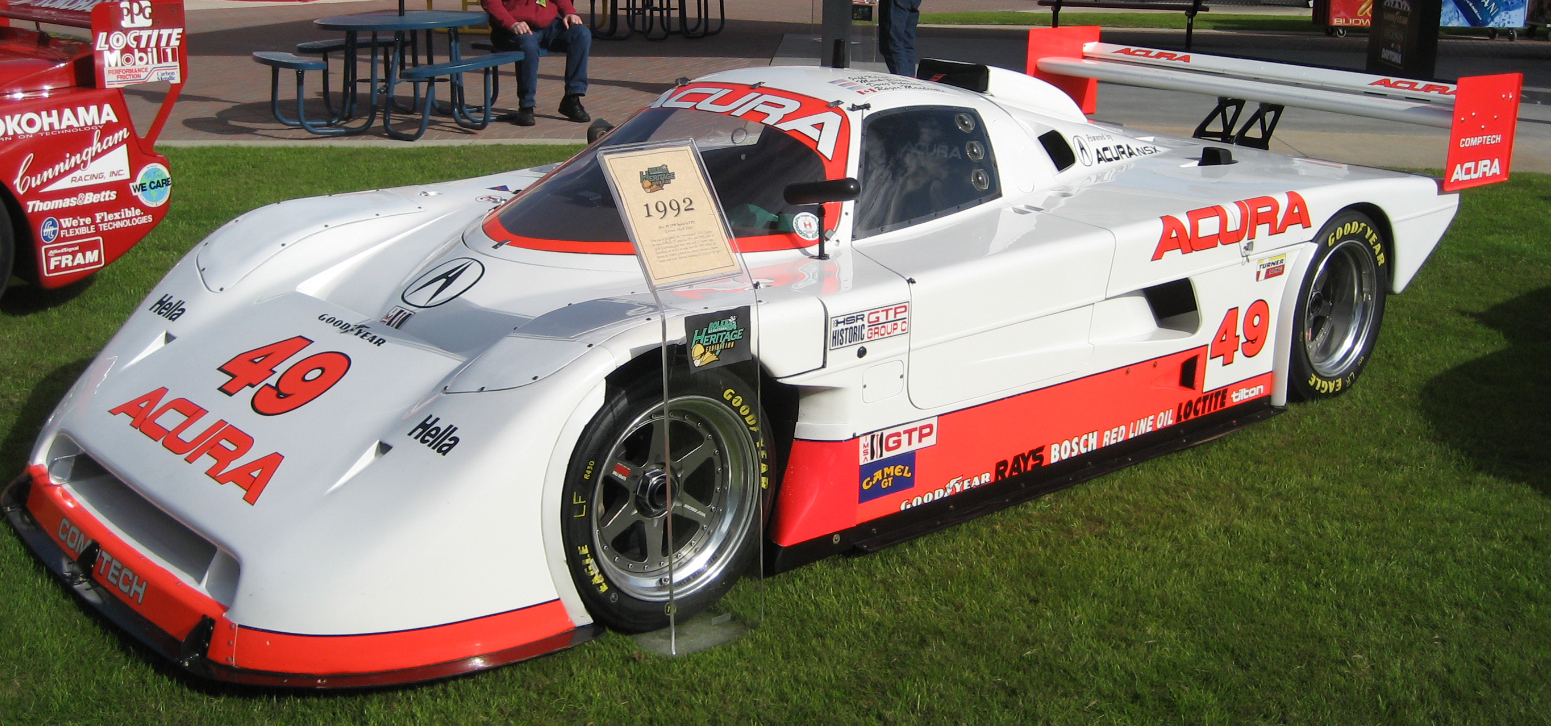
An Acura-powered Spice SE91P from the IMSA GT Championship.

Spice Engineering was a British racing team founded by driver Gordon Spice with Raymond Bellm in the early 1980s, later becoming a successful sports car constructor in 1986. They competed in the World Sportscar Championship in Europe as well as the IMSA GT Championship in North America, at times partnering with major manufacturers such as General Motors and Honda as well as race engine manufacturer Comptech.

== Team history ==
When founded by Gordon Spice and Raymond Bellm, who funded the company with Listerine sponsorship, Spice Engineering initially used Tiga sports cars in the World Sportscar Championship, running in the smaller C2 category. Debuting in the 1984 season, the team managed to score five class wins in the championship, aiding Tiga in finishing third in the constructor's standings. For 1985, the engineering arm of Spice began to develop, as the team assisted in the development of the new Tiga GC85 chassis. Gordon Spice and Ray Bellm managed to take another five class victories that year, including at the 24 Hours of Le Mans, and winning the teams championship. Now constructing their own cars for 1986, Spice also expanded to the IMSA GT Championship, where they assisted in the running of Pontiac's Camel Lights competitor. Meanwhile, in the WSC, Spice would score another two victories, yet miss out on a repeat of the team's championship to Ecurie Ecosse. Spice would return to form in 1987, with seven victories and retaking the championship. Spice would expand on this even more in 1988, when in an eleven race season, they failed to win their class only once, thus earning them a third championship title.

In 1989, Spice would attempt to move into the larger C1 class, where major manufacturers like Mercedes-Benz, Porsche, Jaguar, Nissan, Toyota, and Aston Martin competed. Spice would finish a disappointing ninth in the teams championship, with a race result of fourth that season. Fortunes would improve in 1990 when a large number of the major manufacturers exited the series, leaving Spice to be able to take fourth place in the championship, ahead of the various private Porsche outfits and the factory Toyota squad.

In 1991, Spice chose to concentrate on the IMSA GT Championship. However Euro Racing achieved a string of good results in the 1991 WSC with a Spice SE90C, including four fourth places, helping the team to fourth in the teams championship whilst drivers Cor Euser and Charles Zwolsman finished fifth and sixth in the drivers standings. In addition another Spice had the distinction of being the only C1 class car to be a classified finisher in the 1991 24 Hours of Le Mans. The following year saw Chamberlain Engineering successfully campaigning a Spice SE89C in the declining WSC - the team consistently scored points, including a third place at the 1992 500km of Silverstone and finished fourth in the championship, whilst their lead driver Ferdinand de Lesseps finished seventh in the drivers championship. Chamberlain also dominated the FIA Cup, with de Lesseps winning all six rounds.

Following the collapse of the GTP class in IMSA at the end of 1993, Spice was active in creating update and modification kits to allow existing chassis to be updated to the then-new IMSA WSC specification.

== Constructor history ==
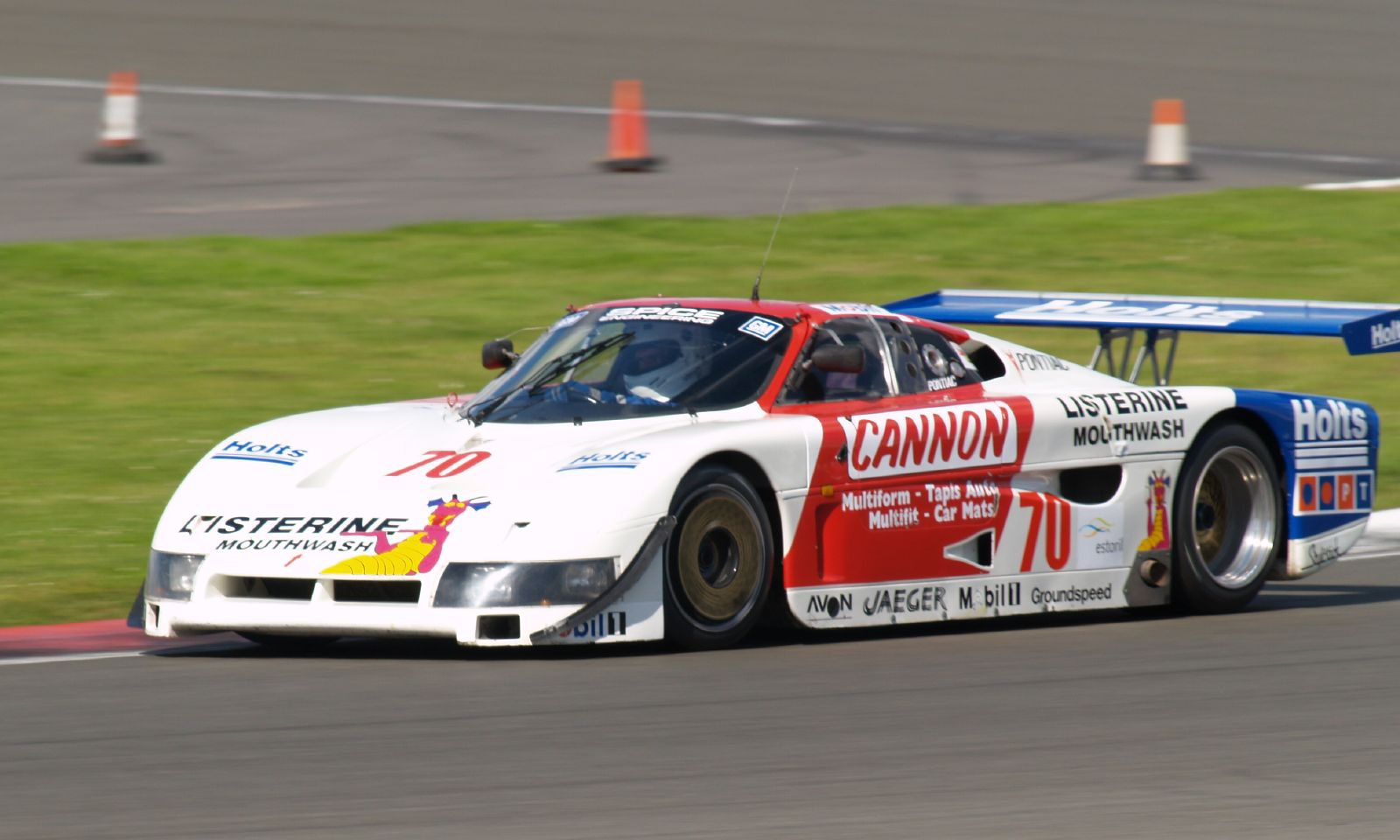
One of the first SE86 chassis, which also ran under the name Pontiac Fiero GTP

Following Spice's initial work on the Tiga GC85, Gordon Spice decided to build his own chassis, not only for the C2 class in the World Sportscar Championship, but also for the Lights class in IMSA GT. He received engineering input from General Motors for the IMSA effort, using Pontiac engines in place of the Ford Cosworths. The first design by the team was the SE86, which the SE standing for Spice Engineering, and 86 for the year of its construction, 1986. This numbering scheme would be used by nearly all Spice chassis.

After having considerable success with their smaller chassis, Spice made the move to the larger C1 and GTP classes with the SE89. This would be replaced by the successful SE90 the following year, of which Spice built near 30 chassis of that design or similar over several years. Many privateers bought the SE90s, winning various championships. Spice would also end its relationship with General Motors, instead becoming the factory squad for Honda, running Acura engines in SE90-based chassis, winning the Camel lights for Honda in 1991, 1992 and 1993. In 1990 Gordon Spice and Ray Bellm sold their interests in Spice Engineering to Jean-Louis Ricci, a Spice customer.

By 1992, Spice began to develop newer designs to replace their older chassis, but the company would soon hit financial troubles before multiple cars could be built. Spice's final GTP chassis was finished in 1993, at which time the GTP and GT Lights Championships had been canceled and IMSA was adopting a new set of rules for open-cockpit sportscars in 1994. Spice built at least three new chassis for the IMSA WSC championship with new suspension and bodywork. In 1994 Spice won the manufacturers championship with Oldsmobile beating Ferrari. Spice also made available a kit to convert existing Group C and IMSA chassis to the new WSC regulations and some teams took up this option, with some opting to carry out their own conversion and development work, without factory assistance. Some of these heavily modified designs would still be racing competitively until 1999.

During Spice's stint as the factory Pontiac team, they also constructed several Pontiac Fiero race cars for the IMSA GTO and GTU classes, having some mixed success. These would be the only Spice's based on production cars instead of purpose-built sports cars.

== Later projects and demise ==
Following the collapse of the major sportscar championships in the early 1990s, Spice won the Manufacturers Championship for Oldsmobile in 1994. Spice planned to build its own road cars and race them in the newer GT championships. The company also announced ambitious plans to create a Formula One team in their new headquarters in Australia. However, the plan never got off the ground and Spice soon closed.

== Successes ==
Both as a team and as a constructor, Spice had considerable success during their racing career through the 1980s and into the 1990s.

=== Team championships and wins ===
Note: IMSA did not award a teams championship during the period that Spice raced

- World Sportscar Championship - 1985, 1987, 1988
- 24 Hours of Le Mans (class wins) - 1985, 1987, 1988, 1990, 1991
- 24 Hours of Daytona (class wins) - 1987 1991, 1992, 1993, 1994, 1995

=== Constructor championships and wins ===
- World Sportscar Championship - 1987, 1988, 1989, 1992
- IMSA GT Championship - 1987, 1988, 1991, 1992, 1993, 1994
- 24 Hours of Le Mans (class wins) - 1987, 1988, 1990, 1991,
- 24 Hours of Daytona (class wins) - 1987, 1991, 1992, 1994, 1995
