= Olav Bjarte Fosso =

Norwegian engineer

- Born: 1958 (age 67–68)
- Scientific career
- Institutions: Norwegian University of Science and Technology

Olav Bjarte Fosso (born 1958) is a Norwegian engineer and full professor of power engineering at the Norwegian University of Science and Technology (NTNU). He is known for his research on hydro scheduling, offshore/onshore grid and market integration of intermittent generations, and smart energy systems. He was elected President of the Norwegian Climate Foundation in 2015.

He was a senior researcher at SINTEF until his appointment as professor at NTNU in 2002, and was director of the Department of Electric Power Engineering from 2009 to 2013. He was also director of the thematic research field "energy" at NTNU 2014–2016. According to Google Scholar he has been cited around 2,000 times and has an h-index of 20.
