= Gjørv =

Gjørv is a surname. Notable people with the surname include:

- Alexandra Bech Gjørv (born 1965), Norwegian lawyer and businesswoman
- Inger Lise Gjørv (1938–2009), Norwegian politician
