= Lånkebanen =

Road racing circuit in Hell, Norway

- Location: Stjørdal Municipality, Norway
- Coordinates: 63.405°N 10.920°E
- Capacity: 13,000
- Owner: Norwegian Automobile Federation
- Opened: 1987
- Major events: Former: FIA World Rallycross Championship; World RX of Norway (2014–2019, 2022–2023); FIA European Rallycross Championship; Euro RX of Norway (2011–2019, 2022–2023)
- Surface: Asphalt (63%); Gravel (37%)
- Length: 1.019 km (0.633 mi)
- Turns: 7

Lånkebanen is a road racing circuit situated just east of the village of Hell in the Lånke area of Stjørdal Municipality, Norway. The venue opened in 1987 as the first asphalt track in the country. It is used for a variety of motorsports, including rallycross, go-kart and motorcycle racing. The venue also features a designated hillclimbing and a motocross track on the slopes below, and a harness racing oval. Lånkebanen is owned by the Norwegian Automobile Federation (NAF).

The venue also serves the National Driving Teacher School and is used for testing by SINTEF and Q-Free. At an international level the venue is used for rallycross races. Lånkebanen has featured a round of the FIA European Rallycross Championship since 2011. It has since the inauguration of the FIA World Rallycross Championship in 2014 hosted World RX of Norway.

== History ==
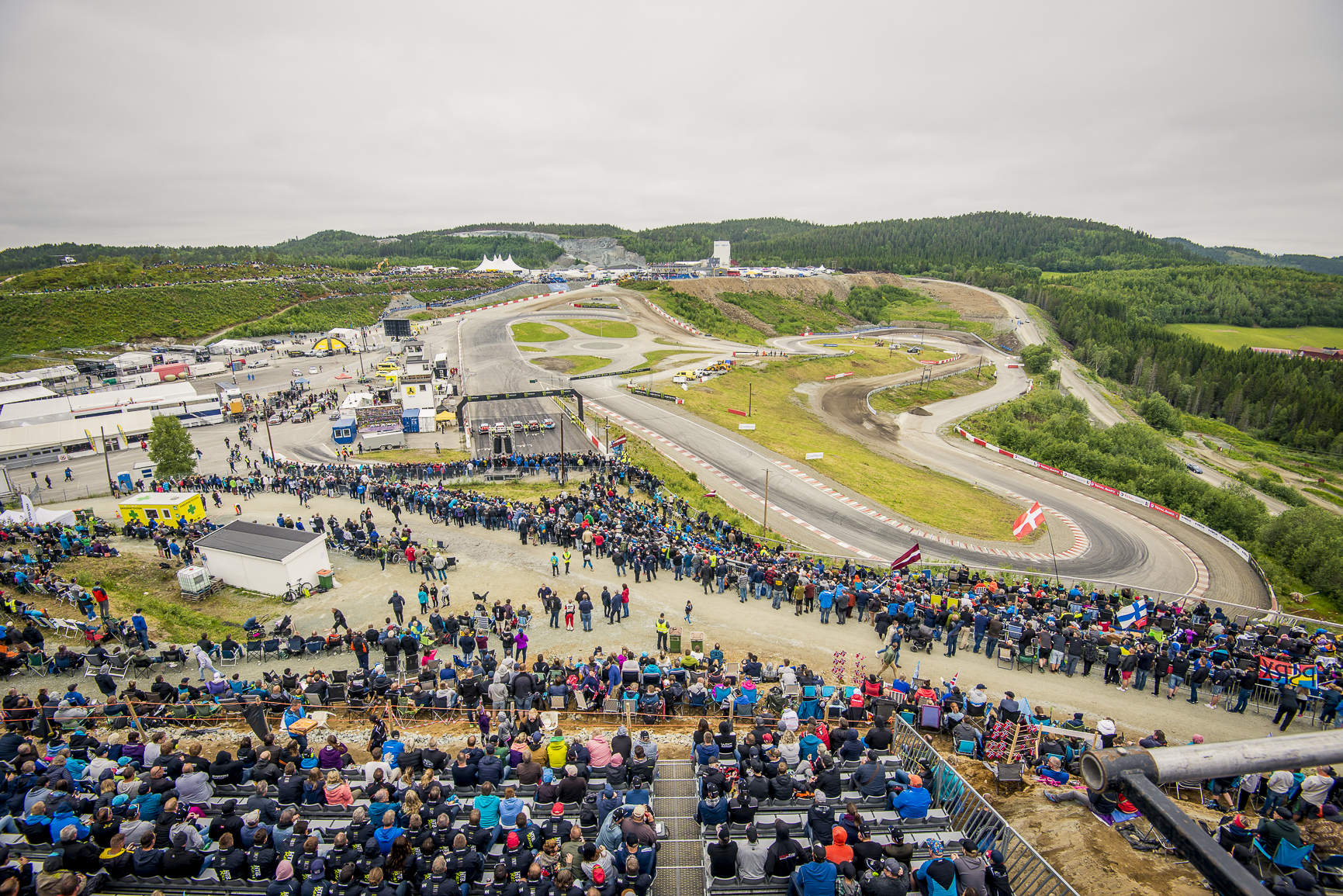
2018 World RX of Norway.

The Lånkebanen venue was devised during the 1980s. At the time of its planning there were no road racing circuits in the vicinity of Trondheim. Lånkebanen is also located near the National Driving Teacher School and SINTEF, allowing the track to be used for driving teacher training and for research.

By 1987 the country received numerous proposals to build motorsport venues, with twenty-five detailed proposals having been issued. The Ministry of Transport and Communications decided that year that Lånkebanen would be the only such venue to receive investment subsidies. The ministry was concerned that most of the plans would simply make matters worse for other neighboring venues, particularly as many new tracks would take away revenue from existing slippery road circuits. The ministry stated that Lånkebanen would be used as a trial to gain experience from state-subsidizing and building of new tracks.

Lånkebanen opened in 1987 as the first combined center for motorsports and driver training. That year the track was used for a trial for slippery courses for truck and bus licenses. The authorities wanted this to become an obligatory part of the training, but lack of suitable venues throughout the country had made the courses optional. Lånkebanen was also the first asphalt race track in the country. It was supplemented by Rudskogen in 1990.

During the 1990s a hillclimbing track was built on the hillside below on the north side of the main track. The motocross track was built in 2002 and 2003, after Stjørdal Cross & Enduro Klubb was founded in 2002. The club hoped for a revival of motocross in the Trondheim area, after all the tracks in the area had been closed during the 1990s. The land below the road circuit was leased from a local farmer to make way for the new venue.

NAF operates two conventional slippery road course tracks in Trøndelag, one at Orkanger and one at Ogndal in Steinkjer Municipality. By the late 2000s the Orkanger track no longer met the demands and NAF therefore considered what to do with the situation. As Lånkebanen met the needs, it was proposed in 2009 that the Orkanger and Ogndal tracks be closed and that Lånkebanen take over the responsibility. After an expansion of the Orkanger venue in 2012, the plans were placed on hold, but resumed the following year.

In 2014 NAF commenced work on a major upgrade to Lånkebanen. Operations was taken over to a separate limited company, NAF Lånkesenteret AS, which received two full-time employees. A new building facility was constructed and a permanent power supply was installed. The largest investment was the building of a new driving center.

== Facilities ==
Lånkebanen is situated at Lånke in Stjørdal, 6 kilometers (4 mi) from the village of Hell. The venue is situated on National Road 705, 7 kilometers (4 mi) from Trondheim Airport, Værnes and Hell Station. By road it is about 40 kilometers (25 mi) from Trondheim.

The venue consists of a main asphalt course. For rallycross this is modified so that the course is 63 percent asphalt and 37 percent gravel. In rallycross configuration, the track is 1,019 meters (3,343 ft) long and 15 meters (49 ft) wide. In addition to featuring the road course, Lånkebanen features both a hillclimbing and a motocross track, situated on the hillside below the main circuit.

The venue serves as the training track of the National Driving Teacher School. The sole school offering driving teacher education in Norway, it has since 2004 been part of Nord-Trøndelag University College. It is also used for trials for Q-Free, a Trondheim-based manufacturer of user road charging systems.

Facilities include a combined clubhouse, office, canteen and classroom building. It features four tracks for slippery courses as well as possibility for simulating traffic situation on the track. It has a capacity for 5,500 car candidates and 400 motorcycle candidates per year.

Below the motorsports venue is Lånke Travbane, used for harness racing. Built in 1983, it features a 535-meter (1,755 ft) long and 10-meter (33 ft) wide oval gravel track. It is owned by Lånke Travlag, a local chapter of the Norwegian Trotting Association. There have been proposals that it would be a suitable site for motorcycle speedway racing.

== Events ==
Domestic competitions in rallycross have been conducted at Lånkebanen since 1989, with an annual Norwegian Championship round. From the late 1990s hillclimbing became popular in Trøndelag. Along with two venues in Trondheim, Lånkebanen started hosting annual competitions. The venue is also used for go-karting.

The international competitions are marketed as "Rallycross in Hell". Lånkebanen hosted its first tournament of the FIA European Rallycross Championship in 2011. The first competition broke even, but the following year the event lost 400,000 Norwegian krone (NOK) of a 1.4-million revenue. The 2013 edition of the competition drew 7,500 spectators.

In 2014 the rallycross structure was changed and the FIA World Rallycross Championship was inaugurated. Lånkebanen was selected to host the World RX of Norway as part of the annual tour. The event doubles as a European Championship round. The first season saw 13,650 spectators and the organizers make a NOK 1.2 million profit of a 4.8 million revenue.

FIA European Rallycross Championship record
Season	Date	Supercars	S1600	Touring cars	Ref
2011	24–25 June	(Norway) Mats Lysen	(Russia) Ildar Rakhmatullin	(Norway) Lars Øivind Enerberg	
2012	23–24 June	(United States) Tanner Foust	(Russia) Ildar Rakhmatullin	(Norway) Lars Øivind Enerberg	
2013	15–16 June	(United Kingdom) Liam Doran	(Latvia) Reinis Nitišs	(Norway) Lars Øivind Enerberg	
2014	14–15 June	(United States) Ken Block	(Latvia) Jānis Baumanis	(Norway) Tom Daniel Tånevik	
2015	20–21 August	(Norway) Tommy Rustad	N/A	(Norway) Christian Sandmo	
2016	11–12 June	(Sweden) Kevin Hansen	N/A	(Sweden) Philip Gehrman	
2017	10–11 June	(Sweden) Robin Larsson	N/A	(Norway) Lars Øivind Enerberg	
2018	7–8 June	N/A	(Finland) Jesse Kallio	(Norway) Daniel Holten	
2019	15–16 June	(Sweden) Robin Larsson	N/A	N/A	
2020	13–14 June	Cancelled due to the COVID-19 pandemic			
2021	12–13 June	Cancelled due to the COVID-19 pandemic			
Season	Date	RX1	RX3	Touring cars	Ref
2022	13–14 August	(Norway) Andreas Bakkerud	(Belgium) Kobe Pauwels	N/A	

FIA World Rallycross Championship record
Season	Date	Driver	Car	Report
2014	14–15 June	(Latvia) Reinis Nitišs	Ford Fiesta	Report
2015	20–21 August	(Sweden) Timmy Hansen	Peugeot 208	Report
2016	11–12 June	(Norway) Andreas Bakkerud	Ford Focus	Report
2017	11–12 June	(Sweden) Johan Kristoffersson	Volkswagen Polo	Report
2018	9–10 June	(Sweden) Johan Kristoffersson	Volkswagen Polo R	Report
2019	15–16 June	(Finland) Niclas Grönholm	Hyundai i20	Report
2020	Cancelled due to the COVID-19 pandemic			
2021	Cancelled due to the COVID-19 pandemic			
Season	Date	RX1e	RX2e	Ref
2022	13–14 August	(Sweden) Johan Kristoffersson	(Belgium) Viktor Vranckx	Report
