= Bovim =

Bovim is a surname. Notable people with the surname include:

- Frode Bovim (born 1977), Norwegian sailor
- Gunnar Bovim (born 1960), Norwegian physician and civil servant
- Ingvill Måkestad Bovim (born 1981), Norwegian track and field athlete
