= Røkke =

Røkke is a Norwegian surname. Notable people with the surname include:

- Kjell Inge Røkke (born 1958), Norwegian businessman
- Mona Røkke (1940–2013), Norwegian politician
- Nils Anders Røkke (born 1963), Norwegian scientist and businessman
