= Randi Holmestad =

Norwegian physicist

Randi Holmestad is a Norwegian physicist and a professor at the Department of Physics at the Norwegian University of Science and Technology. She is known for her work in materials physics, focusing primarily on the relationship between microstructure and macroscopic properties in various materials. Her research has contributed to fields such as transmission electron microscopy, electron diffraction, and the study of aluminum alloys, solar cell materials, and new functional materials.

== Education and career ==
Holmestad studied at the Norwegian Institute of Technology, where she earned her Master of Science (Siv. ing.) degree in Technical Physics in 1991, followed by a PhD in Materials Physics in 1994. Her doctoral dissertation focused on transmission electron microscopy and its application to the study of materials microstructure. After postdoctoral work at the Norwegian Institute of Technology, Holmestad worked at SINTEF, a Norwegian research institute, from 1995 until 1996. She became a professor at the Norwegian University of Science and Technology in 1999.

Holmestad was the project leader for the Norwegian Centre of Transmission Electron Microscopy (NORTEM) from 2010 until 2013, and then again starting in 2017. She is also a part of the ESTEEM3 project where she links academia and industry partners in the use of electron microscopy for industrial applications.

== Awards and honors ==
In 2006 Holmestad was elected a member of Norwegian Academy of Technological Sciences (Norges Tekniske Vitenskapsakademi). She was elected a member of the Royal Norwegian Society of Sciences and Letters (Det Kongelige Norske Videnskabers Selskab) in 2008.

== Selected publications ==
- Marioara, C. D.; Andersen, S. J.; Zandbergen, H. W.; Holmestad, R. (2005). "The influence of alloy composition on precipitates of the Al-Mg-Si system". Metallurgical and Materials Transactions A. 36 (3): 691–702. Bibcode:2005MMTA...36..691M. doi:10.1007/s11661-005-0185-1. ISSN 1073-5623.
- Marioara, C. D.; Andersen, S. J.; Stene, T. N.; Hasting, H.; Walmsley, J.; Van Helvoort, A. T. J.; Holmestad, R. (2007-08-11). "The effect of Cu on precipitation in Al–Mg–Si alloys". Philosophical Magazine. 87 (23): 3385–3413. Bibcode:2007PMag...87.3385M. doi:10.1080/14786430701287377. ISSN 1478-6435.
- Hasting, Håkon S.; Frøseth, Anders G.; Andersen, Sigmund J.; Vissers, Rene; Walmsley, John C.; Marioara, Calin D.; Danoix, Frédéric; Lefebvre, Williams; Holmestad, Randi (2009-12-15). "Composition of β" precipitates in Al–Mg–Si alloys by atom probe tomography and first principles calculations". Journal of Applied Physics. 106 (12) 123527. doi:10.1063/1.3269714. ISSN 0021-8979.
- Nord, Magnus; Vullum, Per Erik; MacLaren, Ian; Tybell, Thomas; Holmestad, Randi (2017). "Atomap: a new software tool for the automated analysis of atomic resolution images using two-dimensional Gaussian fitting". Advanced Structural and Chemical Imaging. 3 (1) 9. doi:10.1186/s40679-017-0042-5. ISSN 2198-0926. PMC 5306439. PMID 28251043.
