= Slørdahl =

Slørdahl is a Norwegian surname. Notable people with the surname include:

- Philip Slørdahl (born 2000), Norwegian footballer
- Stig Arild Slørdahl (born 1959), Norwegian cardiologist and healthcare manager
