= Torbjørn Digernes =

Norwegian physicist

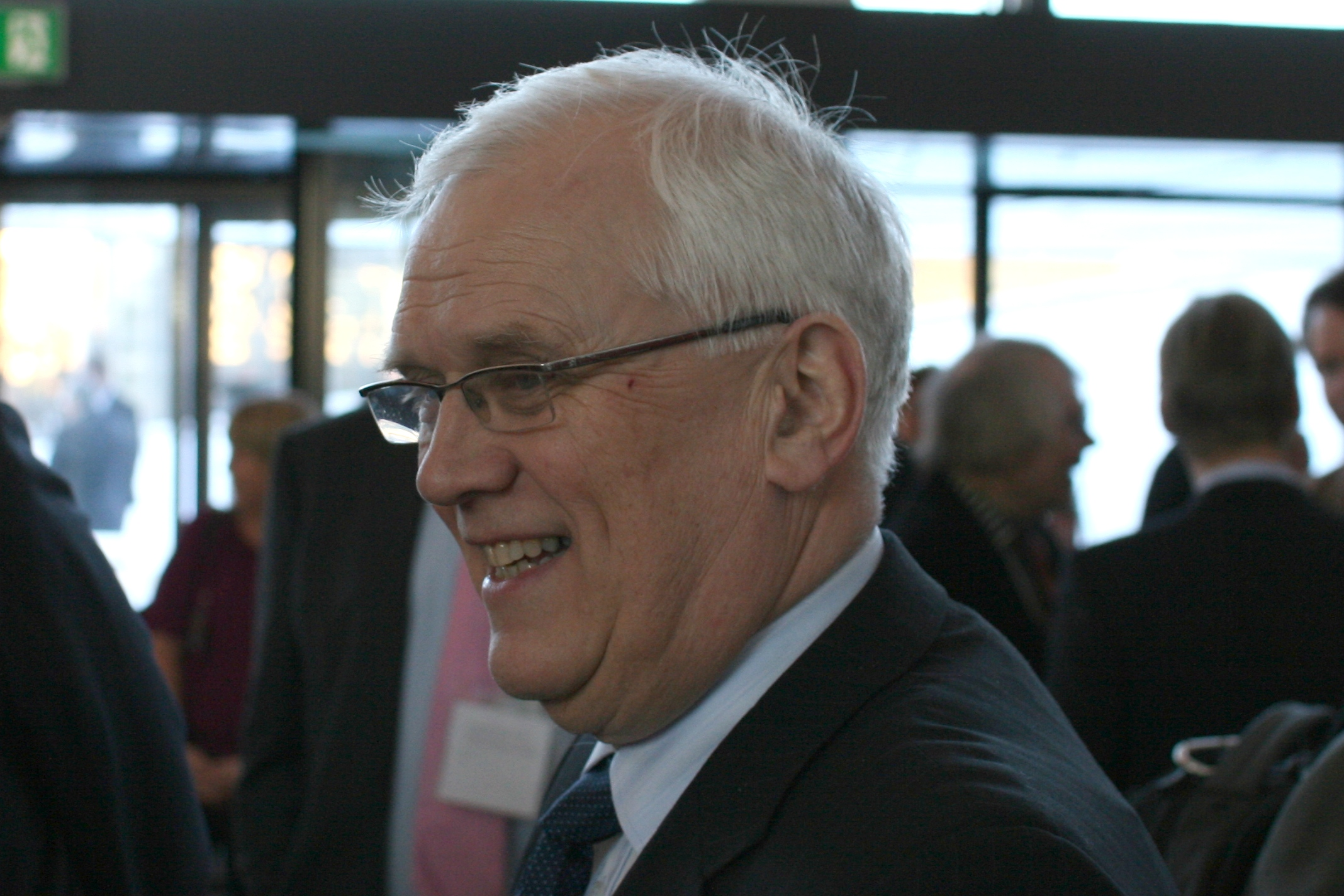
Torbjørn Digernes in 2009

Torbjørn Digernes (born 30 March 1947 in Ørsta) is a Norwegian physicist and professor of marine systems design.

He is a former Rector of the Norwegian University of Science and Technology (NTNU) He started as Rector from 1 August 2005. His successor is Gunnar Bovim who officially assumed the post 1 August 2013.

Digernes is a former student of the then Norwegian Institute of Technology (NTH) as an engineering graduate of technical physics in 1972. He was awarded a Doctor of Philosophy degree in 1982 from the same institution within informatics, concerning technical-economical analysis of design and operation of fishing vessels.

His academic career started at the calculation centre at the University of Trondheim 1972-74, at Fishery Science Research Institute 1974-1986 and at MARINTEK from 1986-1990. From 1990-1996 he was employed at the European Space Agency space station program at the European Space Technical Centre in the Netherlands. In 1984 he became Professor II and in 1998 Professor in marine projecting. He was Dean of the Faculty of Marine Technology from 1999 to 2001, when this was merged with three other faculties to create the Faculty of Engineering and Technology from 2002, where he also was Dean.

Digernes is a fellow of the Norwegian Academy of Technological Sciences.
