= 2020 FIA European Rallycross Championship =

FIA European Rallycross Championship season

The 2020 FIA European Rallycross Championship was the 45th season of the FIA European Rallycross Championship. The season consisted of two rounds across two categories; Supercar and Super1600. The season commenced on 22 August at the Höljesbanan, Höljes, Sweden and finished prematurely on the 6 October at Biķernieku Kompleksā Sporta Bāze in Riga, Latvia.

== Calendar ==
The provisional calendar was unveiled on 30 October 2019.
The season was originally scheduled to start in April but following multiple postponements relating to the COVID-19 pandemic, a revised calendar was released in May 2020 and the championship is now scheduled to begin in August.

| Rnd. | Event | Venue | Dates | Category | Winner | Team |
|---|---|---|---|---|---|---|
| 1 | Euro RX of Sweden | Höljesbanan, Höljes | 22–23 August | Supercar | (Sweden) Oliver Eriksson | (Sweden) Olsbergs MSE |
| 2 | Euro RX of Riga - Latvia | Biķernieku Kompleksā Sporta Bāze, Riga | 19–20 September | Supercar | (Sweden) Oliver Eriksson | (Sweden) Olsbergs MSE |
| 3 | (Spain) Euro RX of Barcelona - Catalunya | Circuit de Barcelona-Catalunya, Montmeló | 17 October | Super1600 | (Switzerland) Yuri Belevskiy | (Hungary) Volland Racing |
| 4 | (Spain) Euro RX of Barcelona - Catalunya | Circuit de Barcelona-Catalunya, Montmeló | 18 October | Super1600 | (Switzerland) Yuri Belevskiy | (Hungary) Volland Racing |
Cancelled due to the 2019-20 coronavirus pandemic
| Event | | Venue | | Original Date | | Series |
| Euro RX of Portugal | | Pista Automóvel de Montalegre, Montalegre | | 2–3 May, then 10–11 October | | Super1600 |
| (Belgium) Euro RX of Benelux | | Circuit de Spa-Francorchamps, Spa-Francorchamps | | 16–17 May, then 3–4 October, then 21–22 November | | Supercar |
| Euro RX of Norway | | Lånkebanen, Hell | | 13–14 June | | Supercar |
| Euro RX of Russia | | Igora Drive, Sosnovo | | 18–19 July | | Super1600 |
| Euro RX of Germany | | Nürburgring, Nürburg | | 1–2 August then 12–13 December | | Supercar |
| Euro RX of Germany | | Nürburgring, Nürburg | | 1–2 August then 12–13 December | | Super1600 |
| Euro RX of France | | Circuit de Lohéac, Lohéac | | 5–6 September | | Supercar |
| Euro RX of France | | Circuit de Lohéac, Lohéac | | 5–6 September | | Super1600 |

=== Calendar changes ===
- Euro RX of Portugal was set to return after a 1-year hiatus, but was cancelled due to the COVID-19 pandemic.
- Euro RX of Great Britain was omitted from the schedule.
- Euro RX of Russia was supposed to join the calendar, but was cancelled and replaced with the Euro RX of Germany (which moved from the Estering to the Nürburgring).
- Euro RX of Barcelona, Euro RX of Portugal, Euro RX of Benelux, Euro RX of Sweden, and Euro RX of Germany were originally scheduled for between April and August. All were rescheduled due to the COVID-19 pandemic.
- Euro RX of Norway and Euro RX of Germany were dropped from the calendar following the May calendar revision.
- Euro RX of France was cancelled, also as a result of the COVID-19 pandemic.
- Euro RX of Germany was to return on the final revision of the calendar, but it was cancelled, due to spikes in COVID-19 cases in Germany, resulting in an early end to the 2020 season
- After being rescheduled twice, Euro RX of Benelux was cancelled due to Belgium going into national lockdown.

== Entry list ==
=== Supercar ===
| Constructor | Entrant | Car | No. | Drivers | Rounds | Ref. |
|---|---|---|---|---|---|---|
| Audi | (Sweden) JC Raceteknik | Audi S1 | 3 | (Norway) Ben-Philip Gundersen | All | |
| Audi | (Sweden) JC Raceteknik | Audi S1 | 54 | (Sweden) Mats Öhman | 1 | |
| Audi | (Hungary) Kárai Motorsport Sportegyesulet | Audi S1 | 73 | (Hungary) Tamás Kárai | All | |
| Ford | (Norway) Nordgård Motorsport | Ford Fiesta | 9 | (Norway) David Nordgård | 1 | |
| Ford | (Finland) IKONEN | Ford Fiesta | 10 | (Finland) Mikko Ikonen | 2 | |
| Ford | (Lithuania) TSK Baltijos Sportas | Ford Fiesta | 55 | (Lithuania) Paulius Pleskovas | 2 | |
| Ford | (Denmark) Daarbak Motorsport | Ford Fiesta | 93 | (Denmark) Tobias Daarbak | 1 | |
| Ford | (Sweden) Olsbergs MSE | Ford Fiesta | 116 | (Sweden) Oliver Eriksson | All | |
| Ford | (Estonia) Reinsalu Sport | Ford Ka | 5 | (Estonia) Andri Õun | 2 | |
| Peugeot | (France) DA Racing | Peugeot 208 | 23 | (France) Andréa Dubourg | All | |
| Peugeot | (France) DA Racing | Peugeot 208 | 87 | (France) Jean-Baptiste Dubourg | All | |
| SEAT | (Germany) ALL-INKL.COM Münnich Motorsport | Seat Ibiza | 38 | (Germany) Mandie August | All | |
| Volkswagen | (Sweden) Eklund Motorsport | Volkswagen Beetle | 74 | (Sweden) Per Eklund | 1 | |
| Volkswagen | (Sweden) MKIVRX | Volkswagen Scirocco | 17 | (Sweden) Daniel Öberg | 1 | |
| Volkswagen | (Sweden) Hedströms Motorsport | Volkswagen Polo | 8 | (Sweden) Peter Hedström | All | |
| Volkswagen | (Sweden) Hedströms Motorsport | Volkswagen Polo | 45 | (Sweden) Pontus Tidemand | 1 | |
| Volkswagen | (Czech Republic) KRTZ Motorsport ACCR Czech Team | Volkswagen Polo | 11 | (Czech Republic) Aleš Fučik | All | |
| Volkswagen | (Norway) TBRX | Volkswagen Polo | 16 | (Norway) Thomas Bryntesson | All | |
| Volkswagen | (Sweden) MKIVRX | Volkswagen Polo | 17 | (Sweden) Daniel Öberg | 2 | |
| Volkswagen | (Sweden) Kristoffersson Motorsport | Volkswagen Polo | 69 | (Norway) Sondre Evjen | All | |

=== Super1600 ===
| Constructor | Entrant | Car | No. | Drivers | Rounds | Ref. |
|---|---|---|---|---|---|---|
| Audi | (Hungary) Volland Racing | Audi A1 | 15 | (Hungary) Gergely Márton | All | |
| Audi | (Hungary) Volland Racing | Audi A1 | 39 | (Russia) Artur Egorov | All | |
| Audi | (Hungary) Volland Racing | Audi A1 | 51 | (Norway) Marius Bermingrud | All | |
| Audi | (Hungary) Volland Racing | Audi A1 | 54 | (Russia) Marat Knyazev | All | |
| Audi | (Hungary) Volland Racing | Audi A1 | 95 | (Switzerland) Yuri Belevskiy | All | |
| Renault | (Netherlands) Marcel Snoeijers | Renault Megane | 50 | (Netherlands) Marcel Snoeijers | All | |
| Renault | (Finland) SET Promotion | Renault Twingo | 22 | (Finland) Rasmus Tuominen | All | |
| Škoda | (Czech Republic) Pajr SRO | Škoda Citigo | 11 | (Czech Republic) Jan Černý | All | |
| Škoda | (Czech Republic) Josef Susta ACCR Czech Team | Škoda Fabia | 16 | (Czech Republic) Josef Susta | All | |
| Škoda | (Portugal) Joao Ribeiro | Škoda Fabia | 99 | (Portugal) Joao Ribeiro | All | |
| Škoda | (Poland) Automax Motorsport | Škoda Fabia | 117 | (Poland) Radoslaw Raczkowski | All | |
| Škoda | (France) Jérémy Lambec | Škoda Fabia | 166 | (France) Jérémy Lambec | All | |

== Results and standings ==
Championship points are scored as follows:

| | Position | | | | | | | | | | | | | | | |
| Round | 1st | 2nd | 3rd | 4th | 5th | 6th | 7th | 8th | 9th | 10th | 11th | 12th | 13th | 14th | 15th | 16th |
|---|---|---|---|---|---|---|---|---|---|---|---|---|---|---|---|---|
| Heats | 16 | 15 | 14 | 13 | 12 | 11 | 10 | 9 | 8 | 7 | 6 | 5 | 4 | 3 | 2 | 1 |
| Semi-Finals | 6 | 5 | 4 | 3 | 2 | 1 | | | | | | | | | | |
| Final | 8 | 5 | 4 | 3 | 2 | 1 | | | | | | | | | | |

- A red background denotes drivers who did not advance from the round

=== Supercar ===
| Pos | Driver | SWE (Sweden) | LAT (Latvia) | Points |
|---|---|---|---|---|
| 1 | (Sweden) Oliver Eriksson | 1 | 1 | 59 |
| 2 | (France) Jean-Baptiste Dubourg | 5 | 3 | 48 |
| 3 | (Norway) Sondre Evjen | 7 | 2 | 40 |
| 4 | (Norway) Ben-Philip Gundersen | 4 | 5 | 39 |
| 5 | (France) Andrea Dubourg | 2 | 4 | 36 |
| 6 | (Sweden) Peter Hedström | 3 | 7 | 32 |
| 7 | (Hungary) Tamás Kárai | 10 | 6 | 25 |
| 8 | (Czech Republic) Aleš Fučik | 13 | 8 | 18 |
| 9 | (Norway) Thomas Bryntesson | 8 | 14 | 16 |
| 10 | (Sweden) Pontus Tidemand | 6 | | 14 |
| 11 | (Germany) Mandie August | 12 | 11 | 14 |
| 12 | (Sweden) Mats Öhman | 9 | | 13 |
| 13 | (Finland) Mikko Ikonen | | 9 | 11 |
| 14 | (Lithuania) Paulius Pleskovas | | 10 | 10 |
| 15 | (Denmark) Tobias Daarbak | 11 | | 8 |
| 16 | (Estonia) Andri Õun | | 13 | 4 |
| 17 | (Sweden) Per Eklund | 15 | | 2 |
| 18 | (Norway) David Nordgård | 16 | | 1 |
| 19 | (Sweden) Dan Öberg | 14 | 12^{1 2} | -16 |
| Pos | Driver | SWE (Sweden) | LAT (Latvia) | Points |

| Colour | Result |
|---|---|
| Gold | Winner |
| Silver | Second place |
| Bronze | Third place |
| Green | Points finish |
| Blue | Non-points finish |
| Blue | Non-classified finish (NC) |
| Purple | Retired (Ret) |
| Red | Did not qualify (DNQ) |
| Red | Did not pre-qualify (DNPQ) |
| Black | Disqualified (DSQ) |
| White | Did not start (DNS) |
| White | Withdrew (WD) |
| White | Race cancelled (C) |
| Blank | Did not practice (DNP) |
| Blank | Did not arrive (DNA) |
| Blank | Excluded (EX) |

^{1} – 10 point penalty.
^{2} – 15 point penalty.

=== Super1600 ===
| Pos | Driver | BAR (Spain) | | Points |
|---|---|---|---|---|
| 1 | (Switzerland) Yuri Belevskiy | 1 | 1 | 59 |
| 2 | (Hungary) Gergely Marton | 2 | 3 | 51 |
| 3 | (Russia) Artur Egorov | 5 | 4 | 39 |
| 4 | (Russia) Marat Kniazev | 7 | 2 | 38 |
| 5 | (Norway) Marius Bermingrud | 4 | 7 | 37 |
| 6 | (Finland) Rasmus Tuominen | 3 | 10 | 32 |
| 7 | (Portugal) Joao Ribeiro | 6 | 5 | 29 |
| 8 | (Czech Republic) Jan Černý | 8 | 9 | 24 |
| 9 | (Czech Republic) Josef Susta | 11 | 6 | 22 |
| 10 | (Poland) Radoslaw Raczkowski | 9 | 8 | 20 |
| 11 | (France) Jérémy Lambec | 10 | 11 | 17 |
| 12 | (Netherlands) Marcel Snoeijers | 12 | 12 | 13 |
| Pos | Driver | BAR (Spain) | | Points |
