= Toppen Bech =

Norwegian journalist (1939–2024)

- Born: Ellen Åse Fagernæs; 28 March 1939; Oslo, Norway
- Died: 5 February 2024 (aged 84)
- Occupation: Journalist
- Known for: Herskapelig (television series)
- Children: Alexandra Bech Gjørv
- Relatives: Sven Ole Fagernæs (brother)
- Awards: King's Medal of Merit (2007)

Toppen Bech (28 March 1939 – 5 February 2024) was a Norwegian journalist.

== Biography ==
Toppen Bech was born in Oslo, and was the mother of Alexandra Bech Gjørv. From 1960 to 1971 she worked for the newspaper Aftenposten, and she edited the magazine Alle Kvinner from 1973 to 1978. She was assigned to the Norwegian Broadcasting Corporation in 1984. She hosted a number of shows, including Unnskyld at jeg spør and Den blå timen. In the television series Herskapelig she presented manor houses and mansions, and a total of 62 programs were produced between 1997 and 2006.

Bech died on 5 February 2024, at the age of 84.
