= Minuendo =

Norwegian manufacturer of hearing protection devices

- Industry: Hearing Protection
- Founded: 2018
- Headquarters: Oslo, Norway
- Area served: Scandinavia
- Key people: Stian Aldrin (CEO) Olav Kvaløy (CSO)
- Website: www.minuendo.com

Minuendo is a manufacturer of Hearing protection devices in the form of lossless Earplugs for the HSE and hearing health market. The products typically address users that are reliant on sound fidelity and spatial awareness while exposed to stressful or dangerous levels of sound. Examples of user groups are Musicians, sound engineers, Construction workers and child care professionals.

== History ==
SAE Hearing AS was established in June 2018 in Oslo, Norway and registered as Minuendo AS in March 2019. In addition to employees, the largest owners as of April 2019 are AF Group and OBOS through Construct Venture, SINTEF Venture V, StartupLab Founders and Halden Municipal Pension Fund.

The company is a commercial spin-off from SINTEF, one of Europe's largest independent research organizations through their Technology Transfer Office (TTO). In part funded by the FORNY program from the Research Council of Norway, a new technology for Hearing protection devices was developed from 2015 to 2018 forming the core of Minuendo's IP.

The acoustical science group at SINTEF has a history developing advanced hearing protection technologies, earlier commercialized through Nacre AS. Nacre was acquired by personal protection equipment supplier Sperian in 2007, which in turn was acquired by Honeywell in 2010.
