= 2016 World RX of Norway =

Rallycross event

- Round 5 of 12 in the 2016 FIA World Rallycross Championship
- Date: 11–12 June 2016
- Location: Hell, Nord-Trøndelag
- Venue: Lånkebanen

Results
Heat winners
- Heat 1: (Norway) Andreas Bakkerud; Hoonigan Racing Division
- Heat 2: (Norway) Andreas Bakkerud; Hoonigan Racing Division
- Heat 3: (Norway) Andreas Bakkerud; Hoonigan Racing Division
- Heat 4: (Norway) Andreas Bakkerud; Hoonigan Racing Division
Semi-final winners
- Semi-final 1: (Norway) Andreas Bakkerud; Hoonigan Racing Division
- Semi-final 2: (Russia) Timur Timerzyanov; World RX Team Austria
Final
- First: (Norway) Andreas Bakkerud; Hoonigan Racing Division
- Second: (Sweden) Timmy Hansen; Team Peugeot-Hansen
- Third: (Sweden) Mattias Ekström; EKS RX

World RX layout of Lånkebanen

The 2016 World RX of Norway was the fifth round of the third season of the FIA World Rallycross Championship and the fourth round of the forty-first season of the FIA European Rallycross Championship. The event was held at the Lånkebanen near Hell, Nord-Trøndelag.

It was a historic win for home driver Andreas Bakkerud, who became the first driver in FIA World Rallycross Championship history to win all four qualifying heats, their semi-final and the final in one weekend.

== Supercar ==
=== Heats ===
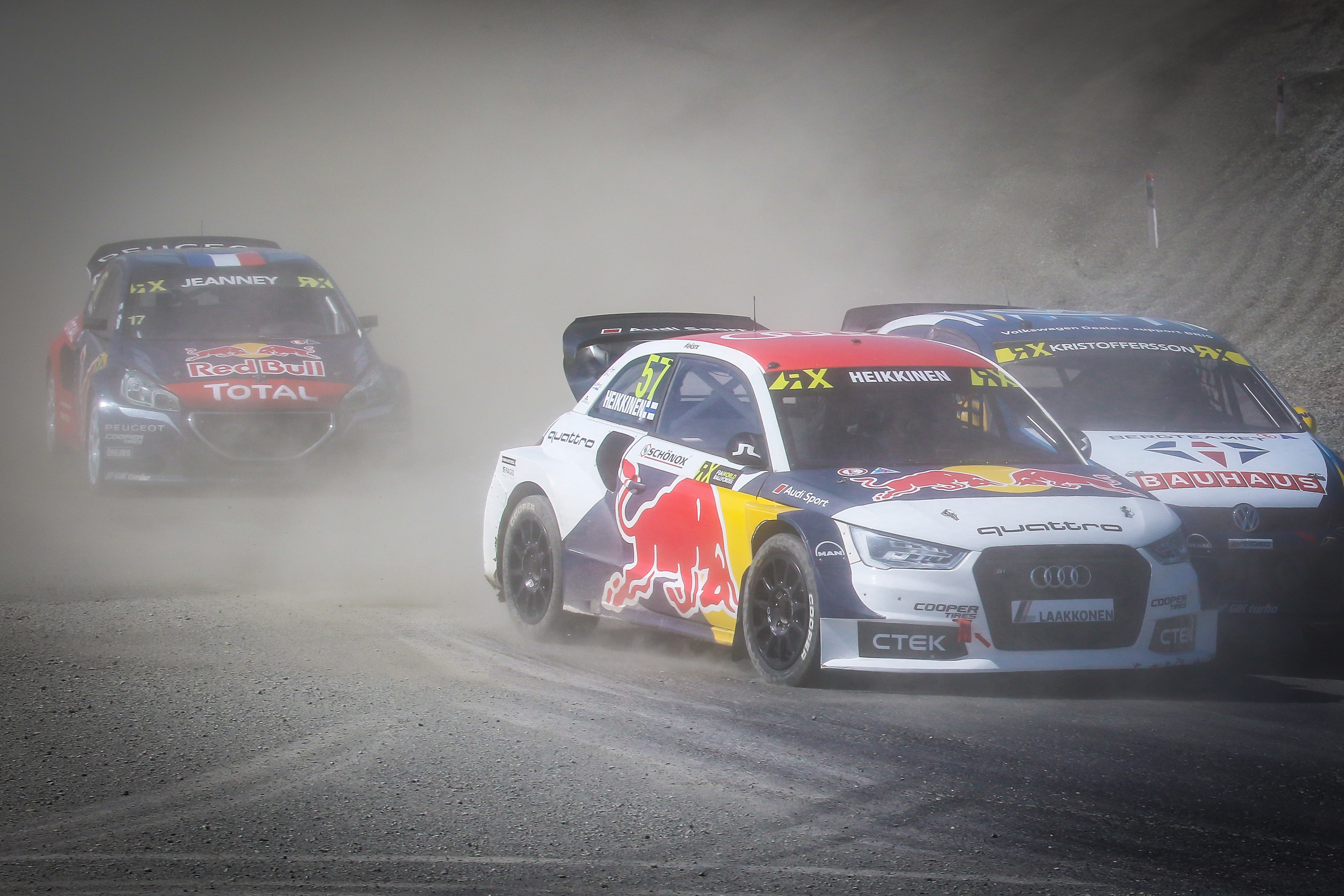
Topi Heikkinen being chased by Johan Kristoffersson and Davy Jeanney

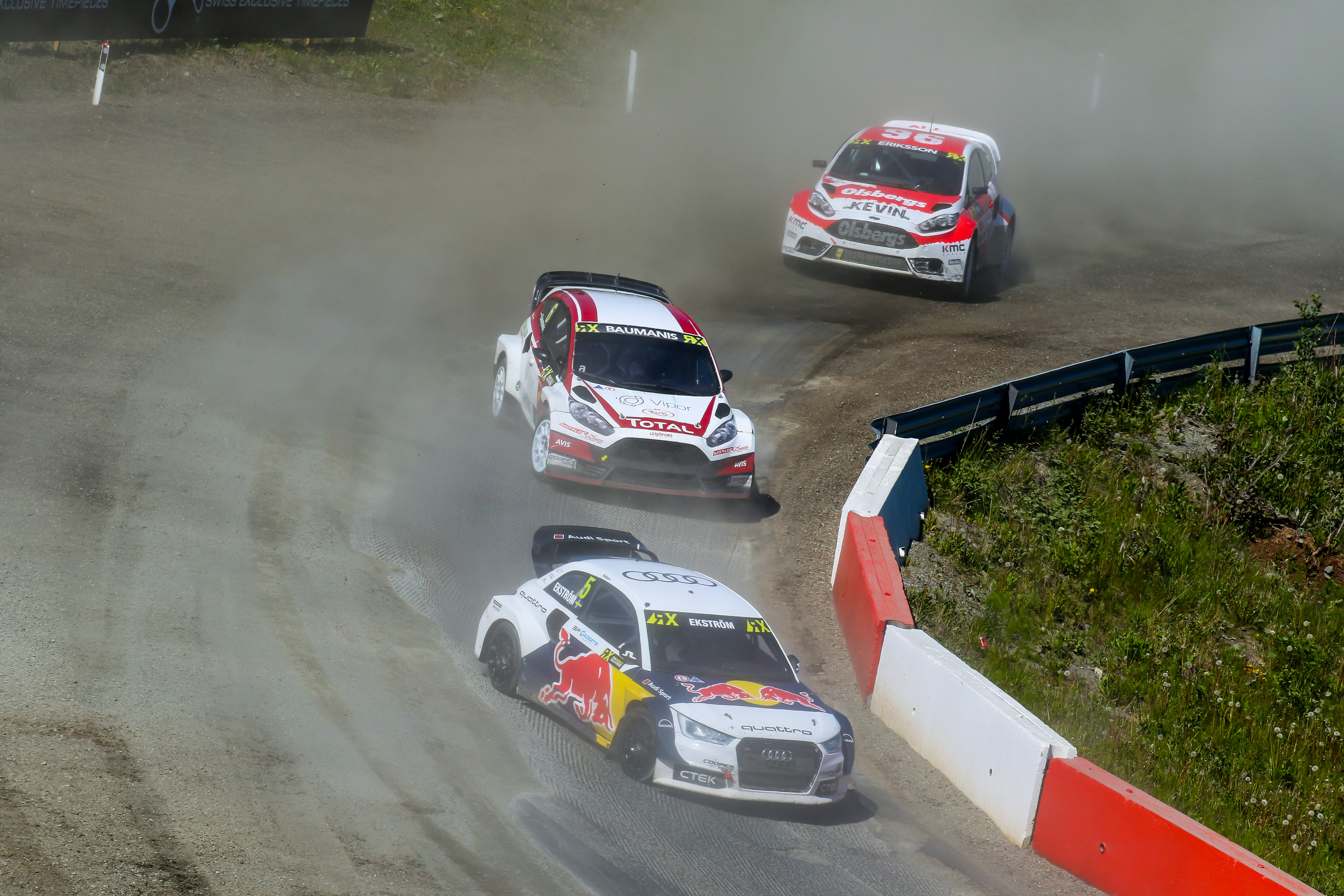
Mattias Ekström, Jānis Baumanis and Kevin Eriksson

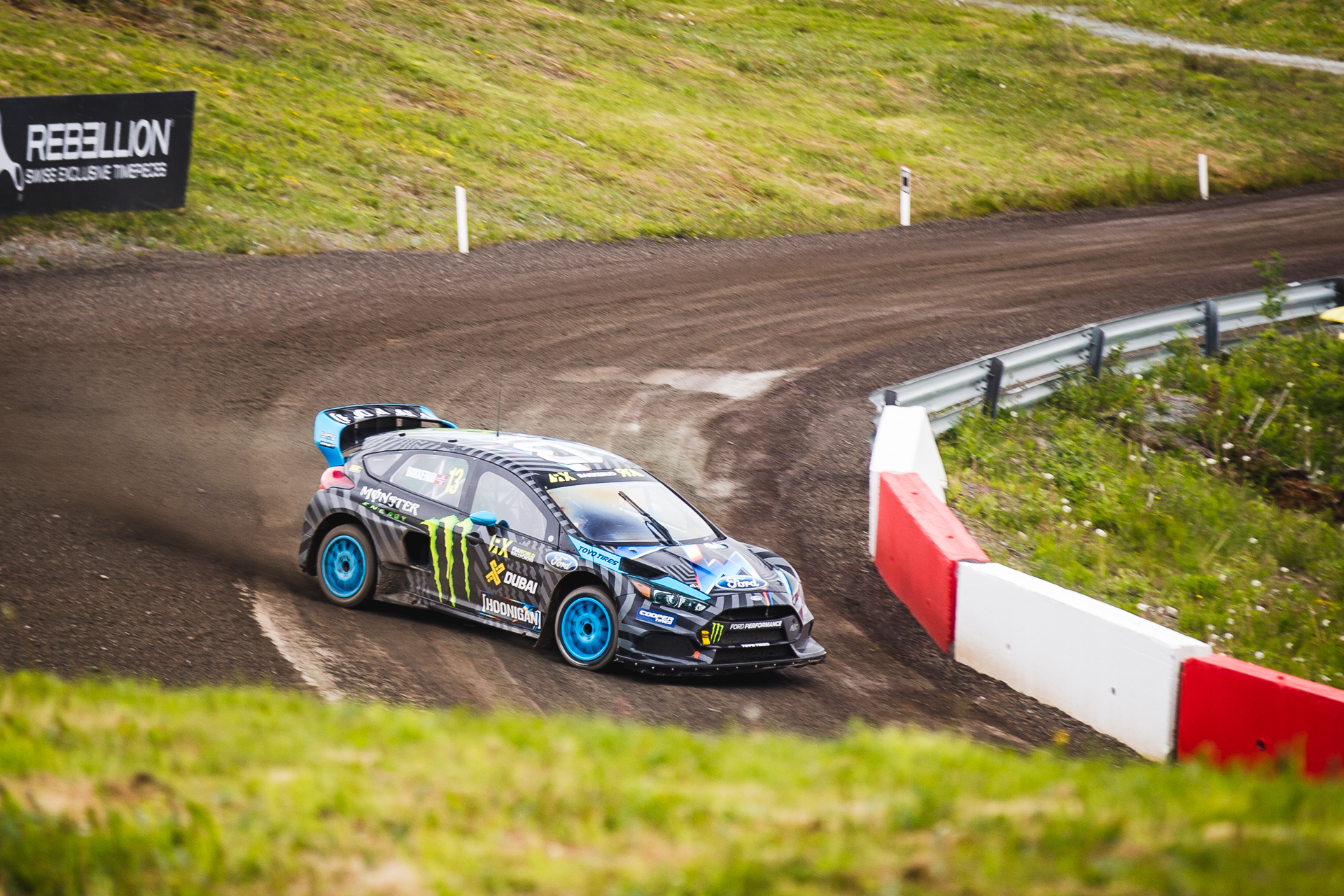
Andreas Bakkerud became the first person to win all four heats, their semi-final and the final in one World Championship event

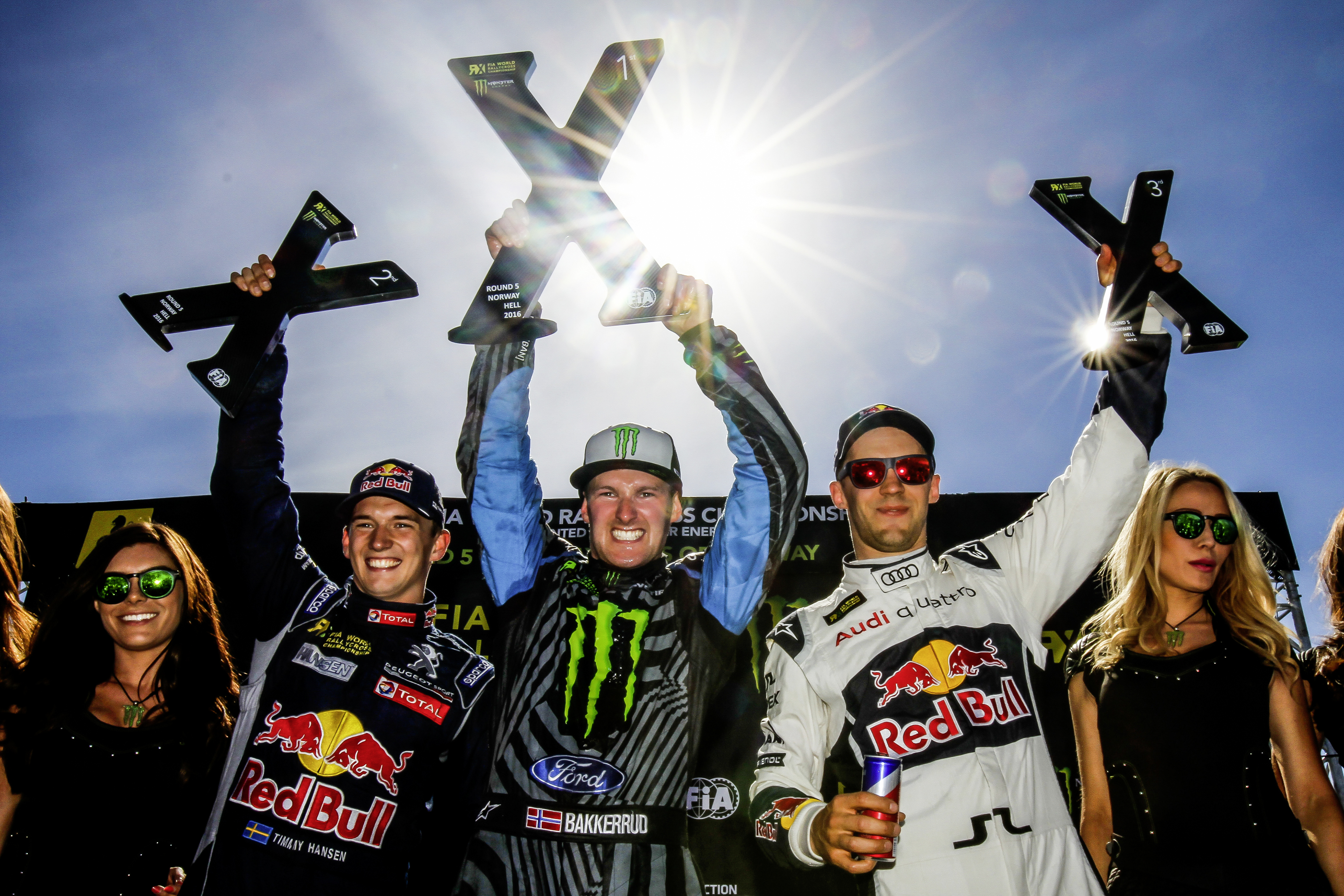
Podium L-R: Timmy Hansen, Bakkerud and Ekström

Pos.	No.	Driver	Team	Car	Q1	Q2	Q3	Q4	Pts
1	13	(Norway) Andreas Bakkerud	Hoonigan Racing Division	Ford Focus RS	1st	1st	1st	1st	16
2	7	(Russia) Timur Timerzyanov	World RX Team Austria	Ford Fiesta	3rd	2nd	3rd	6th	15
3	9	(France) Sébastien Loeb	Team Peugeot-Hansen	Peugeot 208	7th	3rd	2nd	4th	14
4	1	(Norway) Petter Solberg	Petter Solberg World RX Team	Citroën DS3	4th	6th	4th	2nd	13
5	21	(Sweden) Timmy Hansen	Team Peugeot-Hansen	Peugeot 208	2nd	4th	5th	10th	12
6	5	(Sweden) Mattias Ekström	EKS RX	Audi S1	5th	9th	7th	3rd	11
7	3	(Sweden) Johan Kristoffersson	Volkswagen RX Sweden	Volkswagen Polo	8th	8th	6th	5th	10
8	6	(Latvia) Jānis Baumanis	World RX Team Austria	Ford Fiesta	6th	5th	9th	14th	9
9	57	(Finland) Toomas Heikkinen	EKS RX	Audi S1	9th	11th	8th	8th	8
10	4	(Sweden) Robin Larsson	Larsson Jernberg Motorsport	Audi A1	13th	7th	12th	12th	7
11	15	(Latvia) Reinis Nitišs	All-Inkl.com Münnich Motorsport	SEAT Ibiza	12th	14th	11th	9th	6
12	17	(France) Davy Jeanney	Peugeot Hansen Academy	Peugeot 208	10th	12th	13th	11th	5
13	96	(Sweden) Kevin Eriksson	Olsbergs MSE	Ford Fiesta ST	16th	10th	10th	13th	4
14	43	(United States) Ken Block	Hoonigan Racing Division	Ford Focus RS	11th	13th	14th	18th	3
15	92	(Sweden) Anton Marklund	Volkswagen RX Sweden	Volkswagen Polo	18th	15th	18th	7th	2
16	68	(Finland) Niclas Grönholm	Olsbergs MSE	Ford Fiesta ST	15th	17th	15th	16th	1
17	33	(United Kingdom) Liam Doran	JRM Racing	BMW MINI Countryman	14th	18th	16th	15th	
18	77	(Germany) René Münnich	All-Inkl.com Münnich Motorsport	SEAT Ibiza	17th	16th	17th	17th	

=== Semi-finals ===
Semi-final 1

Pos.	No.	Driver	Team	Time	Pts
1	13	(Norway) Andreas Bakkerud	Hoonigan Racing Division	3:56.255	6
2	21	(Sweden) Timmy Hansen	Team Peugeot-Hansen	+1.545	5
3	9	(France) Sébastien Loeb	Team Peugeot-Hansen	+2.127	4
4	3	(Sweden) Johan Kristoffersson	Volkswagen RX Sweden	+2.975	3
5	57	(Finland) Toomas Heikkinen	EKS RX	+5.704	2
6	15	(Latvia) Reinis Nitišs	All-Inkl.com Münnich Motorsport	+13.372	1

Semi-final 2

Pos.	No.	Driver	Team	Time	Pts
1	7	(Russia) Timur Timerzyanov	World RX Team Austria	3:55.235	6
2	5	(Sweden) Mattias Ekström	EKS RX	+1.282	5
3	1	(Norway) Petter Solberg	Petter Solberg World RX Team	+3.789	4
4	17	(France) Davy Jeanney	Peugeot Hansen Academy	+4.577	3
5	6	(Latvia) Jānis Baumanis	World RX Team Austria	+10.929	2
6	4	(Sweden) Robin Larsson	Larsson Jernberg Motorsport	DNF	1

=== Finals ===
Pos.	No.	Driver	Team	Time/retired	Pts
1	13	(Norway) Andreas Bakkerud	Hoonigan Racing Division	3:58.641	8
2	21	(Sweden) Timmy Hansen	Team Peugeot-Hansen	+1.075	5
3	5	(Sweden) Mattias Ekström	EKS RX	+2.479	4
4	1	(Norway) Petter Solberg	Petter Solberg World RX Team	+3.153	3
5	9	(France) Sébastien Loeb	Team Peugeot-Hansen	+4.511	2
6	7	(Russia) Timur Timerzyanov	World RX Team Austria	+7.221	1

== RX Lites ==
=== Heats ===
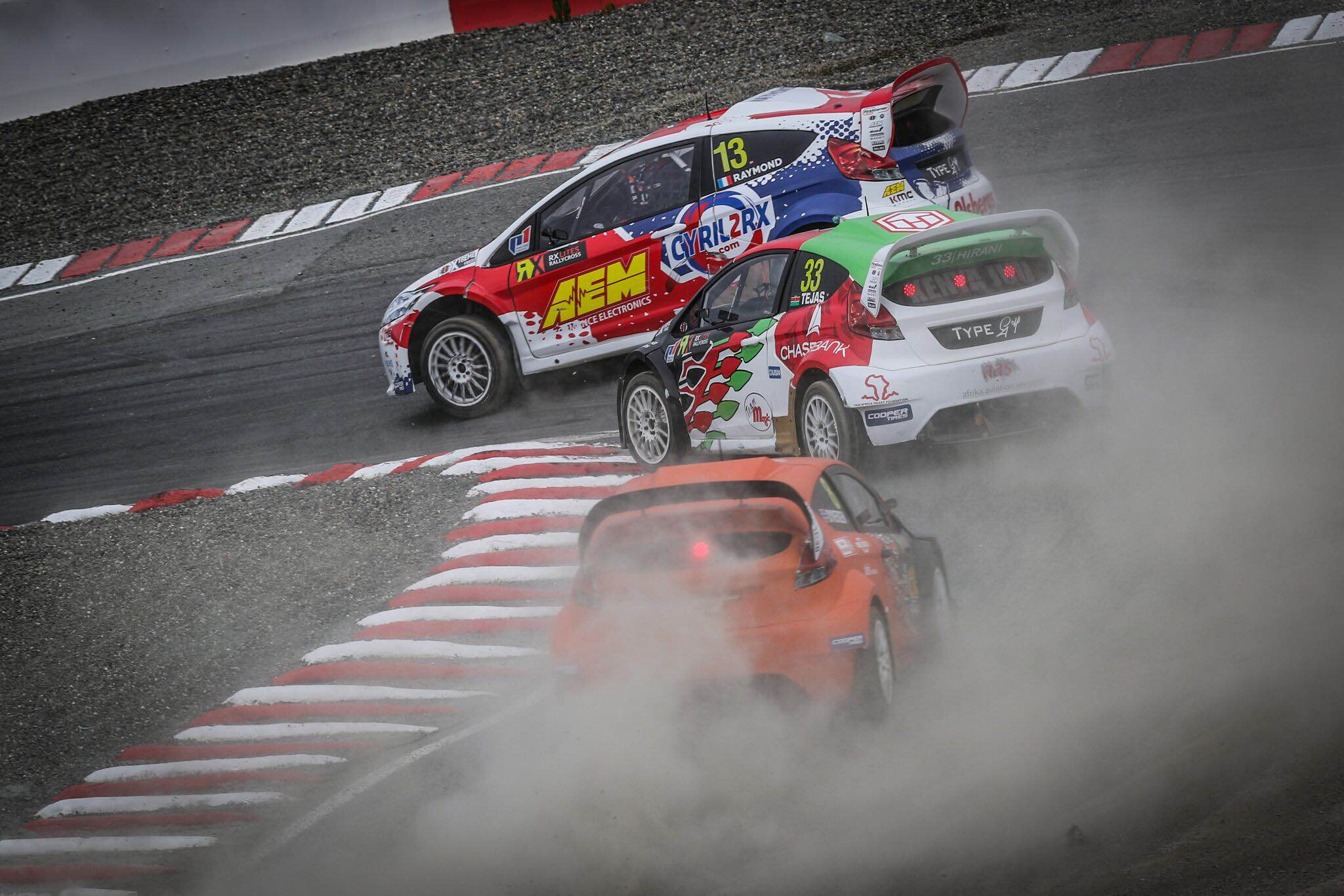
Raymond leads Hirani and Syversen

Pos.	No.	Driver	Team	Q1	Q2	Q3	Q4	Pts
1	13	(France) Cyril Raymond	Olsbergs MSE	2nd	1st	1st	1st	16
2	16	(Norway) Thomas Bryntesson	JC Raceteknik	1st	2nd	4th	3rd	15
3	33	(Kenya) Tejas Hirani	Olsbergs MSE	6th	4th	2nd	2nd	14
4	99	(Norway) Joachim Hvaal	JC Raceteknik	3rd	3rd	5th	9th	13
5	64	(United Arab Emirates) Saeed Bintouq	Olsbergs MSE	4th	5th	7th	7th	12
6	52	(Sweden) Simon Olofsson	Simon Olofsson	7th	6th	9th	5th	11
7	8	(Norway) Simon Wågö Syversen	Set Promotion	8th	8th	8th	4th	10
8	56	(Norway) Thomas Holmen	Thomas Holmen	12th	7th	6th	6th	9
9	96	(Norway) Henrik Krogstad	JC Raceteknik	9th	11th	3rd	10th	8
10	69	(Norway) Sondre Evjen	JC Raceteknik	5th	12th	10th	11th	7
11	66	(Andorra) Albert Llovera	Albert Llovera	11th	10th	12th	8th	6
12	91	(Sweden) Jonathan Walfridsson	Helmia Motorsport	10th	9th	11th	12th	5

=== Semi-finals ===
Semi-final 1

Pos.	No.	Driver	Team	Time	Pts
1	13	(France) Cyril Raymond	Olsbergs MSE	4:14.983	6
2	33	(Kenya) Tejas Hirani	Olsbergs MSE	+1.987	5
3	96	(Norway) Henrik Krogstad	JC Raceteknik	+4.209	4
4	8	(Norway) Simon Wågø Syversen	Set Promotion	+5.121	3
5	64	(United Arab Emirates) Saeed Bintouq	Olsbergs MSE	+9.872	2
6	66	(Andorra) Albert Llovera	Albert Llovera	+12.769	1

Semi-final 2

Pos.	No.	Driver	Team	Time	Pts
1	16	(Norway) Thomas Bryntesson	JC Raceteknik	4:14.979	6
2	52	(Sweden) Simon Olofsson	Simon Olofsson	+0.707	5
3	99	(Norway) Joachim Hvaal	JC Raceteknik	+1.959	4
4	56	(Norway) Thomas Holmen	Thomas Holmen	+7.001	3
5	69	(Norway) Sondre Evjen	JC Race Teknik	+13.924	2
6	91	(Sweden) Jonathan Walfridsson	Helmia Motorsport	+14.238	1

=== Final ===
Pos.	No.	Driver	Team	Time/retired	Pts
1	16	(Norway) Thomas Bryntesson	JC Raceteknik	4:12.701	8
2	13	(France) Cyril Raymond	Olsbergs MSE	+1.127	5
3	52	(Sweden) Simon Olofsson	Simon Olofsson	+2.868	4
4	96	(Norway) Henrik Krogstad	JC Raceteknik	+4.584	3
5	33	(Kenya) Tejas Hirani	Olsbergs MSE	+6.170	2
6	99	(Norway) Joachim Hvaal	JC Raceteknik	+7.245	1

== Standings after the event ==
Supercar standings

Pos	Pilot	Pts	Gap
1	(Sweden) Mattias Ekström	125	
2	(Norway) Petter Solberg	120	+5
3	(France) Sébastien Loeb	83	+42
3	(Sweden) Johan Kristoffersson	83	+42
5	(Norway) Andreas Bakkerud	81	+44

RX Lites standings

Pos	Driver	Pts	Gap
1	(France) Cyril Raymond	102	
2	(Norway) Thomas Bryntesson	101	+1
3	(Sweden) Simon Olofsson	82	+20
3	(Norway) Joachim Hvaal	82	+20
5	(Norway) Simon Wågø Syversen	71	+31

- Note: Only the top five positions are included.

Previous race: 2016 World RX of Great Britain	FIA World Rallycross Championship; 2016 season	Next race: 2016 World RX of Sweden
Previous race: 2015 World RX of Norway	World RX of Norway	Next race: 2017 World RX of Norway
