= 2017 World RX of Norway =

Rallycross event

- Round 6 of 12 in the 2017 FIA World Rallycross Championship
- Date: 10–11 June 2017
- Location: Hell, Nord-Trøndelag
- Venue: Lånkebanen

Results
Heat winners
- Heat 1: (Sweden) Mattias Ekström; EKS RX
- Heat 2: (Norway) Andreas Bakkerud; Hoonigan Racing Division
- Heat 3: Johan Kristoffersson; PSRX Volkswagen Sweden
- Heat 4: (Norway) Petter Solberg; PSRX Volkswagen Sweden
Semi-final winners
- Semi-final 1: (Norway) Andreas Bakkerud; Hoonigan Racing Division
- Semi-final 2: Johan Kristoffersson; PSRX Volkswagen Sweden
Final
- First: Johan Kristoffersson; PSRX Volkswagen Sweden
- Second: (Norway) Andreas Bakkerud; Hoonigan Racing Division
- Third: (France) Sébastien Loeb; Team Peugeot-Hansen

World RX layout of Lånkebanen

The 2017 World RX of Norway was the sixth round of the fourth season of the FIA World Rallycross Championship. The event was held at the Lånkebanen near Hell, Nord-Trøndelag.

== Supercar ==
=== Heats ===
Pos.	No.	Driver	Team	Car	Q1	Q2	Q3	Q4	Pts
1	13	(Norway) Andreas Bakkerud	Hoonigan Racing Division	Ford Focus RS	5th	1st	2nd	2nd	16
2	1	(Sweden) Mattias Ekström	EKS RX	Audi S1	1st	2nd	3rd	4th	15
3	11	(Norway) Petter Solberg	PSRX Volkswagen Sweden	Volkswagen Polo GTI	4th	3rd	6th	1st	14
4	3	(Sweden) Johan Kristoffersson	PSRX Volkswagen Sweden	Volkswagen Polo GTI	2nd	9th	1st	21st	13
5	9	(France) Sébastien Loeb	Team Peugeot-Hansen	Peugeot 208	3rd	7th	10th	12th	12
6	43	(United States) Ken Block	Hoonigan Racing Division	Ford Focus RS	13th	8th	8th	5th	11
7	71	(Sweden) Kevin Hansen	Team Peugeot-Hansen	Peugeot 208	6th	16th	11th	3rd	10
8	15	(Latvia) Reinis Nitišs	EKS RX	Audi S1	7th	10th	12th	8th	9
9	7	(Russia) Timur Timerzyanov	STARD	Ford Fiesta	11th	12th	7th	8th	8
10	57	(Finland) Toomas Heikkinen	EKS RX	Audi S1	14th	6th	5th	16th	7
11	44	(Germany) Timo Scheider	MJP Racing Team Austria	Ford Fiesta	9th	11th	16th	6th	6
12	21	(Sweden) Timmy Hansen	Team Peugeot-Hansen	Peugeot 208	8th	5th	DNF	7th	5
13	96	(Sweden) Kevin Eriksson	MJP Racing Team Austria	Ford Fiesta	22nd	4th	4th	14th	4
14	6	(Latvia) Jānis Baumanis	STARD	Ford Fiesta	12th	14th	9th	11th	3
15	87	(France) Jean-Baptiste Dubourg	DA Racing	Peugeot 208	10th	13th	15th	15th	2
16	68	(Finland) Niclas Grönholm	GRX	Ford Fiesta	18th	18th	13th	10th	1
17	100	(United Kingdom) Guy Wilks	LOCO World RX Team	Volkswagen Polo	20th	15th	14th	13th	
18	60	(Finland) Joni-Pekka Rajala	Vaaranmaa Racing	Mitsubishi Mirage	17th	19th	17th	17th	
19	36	(France) Guerlain Chicherit	Guerlain Chicherit	Renault Clio	15th	17th	18th	DNF	
20	78	(France) Laurent Bouliou	Laurent Bouliou	Peugeot 208	16th	20th	21st	20th	
21	84	(France) "Knapick"	Hervé "Knapick" Lemonnier	Citroën DS3	19th	21st	20th	19th	
22	10	(Hungary) "Csucsu"	Speedy Motorsport	Kia Rio	21st	22nd	19th	18th	

=== Semi-finals ===
Semi-final 1

Pos.	No.	Driver	Team	Time	Pts
1	13	(Norway) Andreas Bakkerud	Hoonigan Racing Division	4:04.118	6
2	9	(France) Sébastien Loeb	Team Peugeot-Hansen	+1.116	5
3	7	(Russia) Timur Timerzyanov	STARD	+2.649	4
4	11	(Norway) Petter Solberg	PSRX Volkswagen Sweden	+2.917	3
5	44	(Germany) Timo Scheider	MJP Racing Team Austria	+3.713	2
6	71	(Sweden) Kevin Hansen	Team Peugeot-Hansen	+4.747	1

Semi-final 2

Pos.	No.	Driver	Team	Time	Pts
1	3	(Sweden) Johan Kristoffersson	PSRX Volkswagen Sweden	3:59.754	6
2	1	(Sweden) Mattias Ekström	EKS RX	+1.380	5
3	21	(Sweden) Timmy Hansen	Team Peugeot-Hansen	+3.922	4
4	43	(United States) Ken Block	Hoonigan Racing Division	+4.086	3
5	57	(Finland) Toomas Heikkinen	EKS RX	+5.238	2
6	15	(Latvia) Reinis Nitišs	EKS RX	+5.985	1

=== Finals ===
Pos.	No.	Driver	Team	Time	Pts
1	3	(Sweden) Johan Kristoffersson	PSRX Volkswagen Sweden	3:57.461	8
2	13	(Norway) Andreas Bakkerud	Hoonigan Racing Division	+1.947	5
3	9	(France) Sébastien Loeb	Team Peugeot-Hansen	+3.815	4
4	1	(Sweden) Mattias Ekström	EKS RX	+4.267	3
5	21	(Sweden) Timmy Hansen	Team Peugeot-Hansen	+4.436	2
6	7	(Russia) Timur Timerzyanov	MJP Racing Team Austria	+6.414	1

== RX2 International Series ==
=== Heats ===
Pos.	No.	Driver	Team	Q1	Q2	Q3	Q4	Pts
1	13	(France) Cyril Raymond	Olsbergs MSE	1st	13th	1st	1st	16
2	11	(United States) Tanner Whitten	Olsbergs MSE	7th	4th	2nd	2nd	15
3	66	(Sweden) William Nilsson	JC Raceteknik	3rd	2nd	14th	6th	14
4	40	(United Kingdom) Dan Rooke	Dan Rooke	10th	9th	3rd	3rd	13
5	69	(Norway) Sondre Evjen	JC Raceteknik	16th	1st	5th	10th	12
6	9	(Norway) Glenn Haug	Glenn Haug	6th	16th	4th	4th	11
7	96	(Belgium) Guillaume De Ridder	Guillaume De Ridder	4th	11th	8th	7th	10
8	52	(Sweden) Simon Olofsson	Simon Olofsson	2nd	3rd	10th	DNF	9
9	19	(Sweden) Andreas Bäckman	Olsbergs MSE	8th	14th	6th	5th	8
10	21	(Sweden) Marcus Höglund	JC Raceteknik	15th	5th	7th	12th	7
11	55	(Latvia) Vasily Gryazin	Sports Racing Technologies	5th	15th	12th	8th	6
12	8	(Norway) Simon Wågø Syversen	Set Promotion	11th	12th	17th	9th	5
13	43	(Norway) Tony Sormbroen	BPG Motorsport	DNF	7th	9th	13th	4
14	26	(Sweden) Jessica Bäckman	Olsbergs MSE	17th	6th	13th	15th	3
15	51	(Sweden) Sandra Hultgren	Sandra Hultgren	DNF	10th	15th	11th	2
16	12	(Sweden) Anders Michalak	Anders Michalak	14th	8th	DNF	16th	1
17	91	(Sweden) Jonathan Walfridsson	Helmia Motorsport	13th	17th	11th	17th	
18	56	(Norway) Thomas Holmen	Bard Holmen	12th	18th	18th	14th	
19	98	(Norway) Stein Frederic Akre	Stein Frederic Akre	9th	DNS	16th	18th	

=== Semi-finals ===
Semi-final 1

Pos.	No.	Driver	Team	Time	Pts
1	13	(France) Cyril Raymond	Olsbergs MSE	4:29.314	6
2	66	(Sweden) William Nilsson	JC Raceteknik	+3.053	5
3	19	(Sweden) Andreas Bäckman	Olsbergs MSE	+6.771	4
4	69	(Norway) Sondre Evjen	JC Raceteknik	+7.766	3
5	96	(Belgium) Guillaume De Ridder	Guillaume De Ridder	+8.722	2
6	No.	(Latvia) Vasily Gryazin	Sports Racing Technologies	+11.033	1

Semi-final 2

Pos.	No.	Driver	Team	Time	Pts
1	11	(United States) Tanner Whitten	Olsbergs MSE	4:30.697	6
2	40	(United Kingdom) Dan Rooke	Dan Rooke	+0.968	5
3	9	(Norway) Glenn Haug	Glenn Haug	+2.303	4
4	8	(Norway) Simon Wågø Syversen	Set Promotion	+4.734	3
5	52	(Sweden) Simon Olofsson	Simon Olofsson	+5.024	2
6	21	(Sweden) Marcus Höglund	JC Raceteknik	+6.584	1

=== Final ===
Pos.	No.	Driver	Team	Time	Pts
1	13	(France) Cyril Raymond	Olsbergs MSE	4:27.125	8
2	11	(United States) Tanner Whitten	Olsbergs MSE	+4.880	5
3	40	(United Kingdom) Dan Rooke	Dan Rooke	+5.549	4
4	9	(Norway) Glenn Haug	Glenn Haug	+7.245	3
5	19	(Sweden) Andreas Bäckman	Olsbergs MSE	+9.154	2
6	66	(Sweden) William Nilsson	JC Raceteknik	+10.867	1

== Standings after the event ==
Supercar standings

Pos.	Driver	Pts	Gap
1	(Sweden) Johan Kristoffersson	151	
2	(Sweden) Mattias Ekström	143	+8
3	(Norway) Petter Solberg	134	+17
4	(Sweden) Timmy Hansen	102	+49
5	(France) Sébastien Loeb	102	+49

RX2 standings

Pos	Driver	Pts	Gap
1	(France) Cyril Raymond	85	
2	(United Kingdom) Dan Rooke	73	+12
3	(United States) Tanner Whitten	59	+26
4	(Norway) Glenn Haug	52	+33
5	(Sweden) Simon Olofsson	50	+35

- Note: Only the top five positions are included.

Previous race: 2017 World RX of Great Britain	FIA World Rallycross Championship; 2017 season	Next race: 2017 World RX of Sweden
Previous race: 2016 World RX of Norway	World RX of Norway	Next race: 2018 World RX of Norway
