= World RX of Norway =

Rallycross event held in Norway

The World RX of Norway was a Rallycross event held in Norway for the FIA World Rallycross Championship. The event made its debut in the 2014 season, at the Lånkebanen circuit near the town of Hell in Nord-Trøndelag.

World RX layout of Lånkebanen

== Past winners ==
| Year | Heat 1 winner | Heat 2 winner | Heat 3 winner | Heat 4 winner | Semi-Final 1 winner | Semi-Final 2 winner | Final winner |
|---|---|---|---|---|---|---|---|
| 2014 | (Latvia) Reinis Nitišs | (United Kingdom) Liam Doran | (United Kingdom) Liam Doran | (Norway) Petter Solberg | (Norway) Petter Solberg | (Latvia) Reinis Nitišs | (Latvia) Reinis Nitišs |
| 2015 | (Norway) Petter Solberg | (Sweden) Timmy Hansen | (Sweden) Timmy Hansen | (Norway) Petter Solberg | (Sweden) Timmy Hansen | (Sweden) Per-Gunnar Andersson | (Sweden) Timmy Hansen |
| Year | Qualifying 1 winner | Qualifying 2 winner | Qualifying 3 winner | Qualifying 4 winner | Semi-Final 1 winner | Semi-Final 2 winner | Final winner |
| 2016 | (Norway) Andreas Bakkerud | (Norway) Andreas Bakkerud | (Norway) Andreas Bakkerud | (Norway) Andreas Bakkerud | (Norway) Andreas Bakkerud | (Russia) Timur Timerzyanov | (Norway) Andreas Bakkerud |
| 2017 | (Sweden) Mattias Ekström | (Norway) Andreas Bakkerud | (Sweden) Johan Kristoffersson | (Norway) Petter Solberg | (Norway) Andreas Bakkerud | (Sweden) Johan Kristoffersson | (Sweden) Johan Kristoffersson |
| 2018 | (Sweden) Johan Kristoffersson | (Sweden) Johan Kristoffersson | (Sweden) Johan Kristoffersson | (Sweden) Johan Kristoffersson | (Sweden) Johan Kristoffersson | (Sweden) Timmy Hansen | (Sweden) Johan Kristoffersson |
| 2019 | (Finland) Niclas Grönholm | (Finland) Niclas Grönholm | (Sweden) Timmy Hansen | (Finland) Niclas Grönholm | (Finland) Niclas Grönholm | (United Kingdom) Liam Doran | (Finland) Niclas Grönholm |
| 2020 | Cancelled due to the COVID-19 pandemic | | | | | | |
| 2021 | Cancelled due to the COVID-19 pandemic | | | | | | |
| Year | Heat 1 winner | Heat 2 winner | Heat 3 winner | Progression best time | Semi-Final 1 winner | Semi-Final 2 winner | Final winner |
| 2022 | (Sweden) Johan Kristoffersson | (Sweden) Timmy Hansen | (Sweden) Johan Kristoffersson | (Sweden) Johan Kristoffersson | (Norway) Ole Christian Veiby | (Finland) Niclas Grönholm | (Sweden) Johan Kristoffersson |
| Year | Heat 1 winner | Heat 2 winner | Heat 3 winner | Heat 4 winner | Semi-Final 1 winner | Semi-Final 2 winner | Final winner |
| 2023 | (Sweden) Johan Kristoffersson | (Sweden) Johan Kristoffersson | (Sweden) Johan Kristoffersson | (Sweden) Johan Kristoffersson | (Sweden) Johan Kristoffersson | (Finland) Niclas Grönholm | (Sweden) Johan Kristoffersson |
