= Gjørv Report =

22 July Commission report of the 2011 Norway attacks

The Gjørv Report (Gjørv-rapporten or NOU 2012: 14, Rapport fra 22. juli-kommisjonen) is a report that was ordered by Norway's parliament, as a consequence of the 2011 Oslo bombing and the following Utøya massacre. The report was delivered to Norway's prime minister, Jens Stoltenberg, on 13 August 2012, one year after the establishment of the "22 July" fact finding commission headed by Alexandra Bech Gjørv. The report found that the Norwegian Police Security Service (PST) were aware of Anders Behring Breivik purchasing material components that could be used to produce a bomb, however, intelligence services failed to add Breivik to a watch list to further monitor his activities, the report also cites a "lack of preparedness" by the Norwegian Police Service to locate and mobilize adequate transportation leading to a response time delay for police and rescue operations attempting to gain access to Utøya Island. It also concluded that Anders Breivik could have been prevented from carrying out the Utøya massacre had police adequately responded to a call from a witness identifying Breivik as the suspect of the Oslo bombing twenty minutes prior to the first calls of a mass casualty shooting occurring on Utøya Island.

The Gjørv Report has 482 pages and was compiled by a ten-person commission which was chaired by lawyer and former Statoil ASA executive Alexandra Bech Gjørv and also included the former head of the Norwegian Intelligence Service, academics, executives as well as police officials from neighboring Denmark and Finland. The report used data from global positioning systems (GPS), photos, film and audio files in addition to reports and interviews.

== Commission findings ==
The report found that

- 1.) the attack on the government complex in Oslo could have been prevented by effective implementation of security measures that had already been approved,
- 2.) a more rapid police operation to protect people on Utøya Island was a realistic possibility and the gunman could have been stopped earlier on 22 July (up to half an hour sooner), and
- 3.) more security and emergency measures to prevent further attacks and "mitigate adverse effects" should have been implemented on 22 July.

The commission also lamented police shortcomings before and during the Utøya shooting, noting the tardiness with which the description of Breivik and his vehicle were released, communication problems, failure to follow procedures, and inadequate means, among other things. "All in all, July 22 revealed serious shortfalls in society's emergency preparedness and ability to avert threats," the commission said. Police should have automatically activated drills meant to guard against multiple attacks but weak leadership and disorganization led to delays, the report said. The military was not immediately informed, police could not find a working helicopter to reach Utøya Island, and its boat, intended to transport special forces to the island, could not carry the necessary load. "The challenges turned out to be ascribable to leadership and communication to a far greater extent than to the lack of response personnel," it said.

Alexandra Bech Gjørv, chairman of the 22 July Commission, said a failure to mobilise helicopters, share information or accept help from private individuals prepared to drive boats to Utøya contributed to "the most inconceivable brutality". "We have seen there are good plans ... but authorities have not learned enough from exercises conducted or implemented approved measures," Gjørv told reporters. The commission also noted a "serious need for change" of emergency preparedness routines, she said. The perpetrator of the attacks was, however, "to be blamed for the loss of lives", Gjørv said.

The commission said the Norwegian Police Security Service "could have become aware" of Breivik's plans, but stopped short of saying it could have stopped him. However, it said the car bomb "could have been prevented through effective implementation of already adopted security measures" at the government complex. The report was critical of what it identified as bureaucratic failings between departments that had left government buildings in the center of Oslo vulnerable to attacks. The buildings had been considered potential terrorism targets as far back as 2006 in a security exercise that had recommended closing the street where Breivik parked his explosive-packed van. The report said that a car bomb "at the government complex and several co-ordinated attacks have been recurring scenarios in threat assessments as well as for safety analyses and exercise scenarios for many years." The government building should have been much better protected as it had been identified as a security risk years before. But government squabbling over minor details of the security measures needed meant little was done. The inquiry team questioned why Grubbegata, the street outside the prime minister's office, was not closed to traffic as recommended in 2004. Breivik was able to park a van with a fertilizer bomb just outside the high-rise that houses the prime minister's office. Plans to close off the street in front of the government building were approved in 2010, but work on constructing physical barriers had not been completed and no temporary obstacles had been set up. A parking ban in the area was not strictly enforced.

The report also gives details of a phone-call made by a pedestrian 10 minutes after the Oslo bomb went off, giving police a good description of a man carrying a pistol and wearing protective clothing. The operator passed the message on but the tip-off was not followed up for some two hours, the report says. "The nationwide message service failed seriously," said the commission chairwoman Alexandra Bech Gjørv. "Ten minutes after the bomb detonated, a person gave them information about a man in a police uniform holding a pistol who was acting strangely. The person said he got into a gray van. He gave the license plate number." "The person who took this call knew this was important," she said. "She brought this information to the operations center. This lay around for 20 minutes. Once it was passed on, it was not read until two hours later." The tip was wasted altogether as "communication problems, failure to follow procedures and inadequate means," bogged down police reaction and operation regarding the emergency incident, the report said.

The report noted that Norway's only police helicopter in Oslo was left unused because its crew was on vacation. Police operations centers were understaffed, and the availability of helicopters was "limited," the report said. Police information-sharing "is subject to formidable weaknesses," and the Police Security Services had not done enough training for a terrorist attack, the commission said. Although it was clear that a terrorist attack had been carried out, the inquiry says no immediate nationwide alert was given, no roadblocks or observation posts were set up, no attempt was made to mobilise helicopters nor did the operation centre take up offers from neighbouring police districts. The operation centre was "simply overloaded", the report concludes, to the extent that staff did little to prevent further attacks during "the acute phase".

The commission recognized that "hardly anyone could have imagined" the secondary attack on Utøya. "Sadly, however, after repeated school massacres in other countries, an armed desperado who shoots adolescents is indeed conceivable – also in Norway," It added. It found that police had taken an "unacceptable time" to reach Utøya and it criticised forces for the bungled attempt to reach the island on an inflatable boat. More specifically the commission deemed the 35 minutes which police needed to cross the 600m from the lake shore to the island as "unacceptable time". Shootings were reported on Utøya as early as 17:25 local time and within five minutes police were contacted by a boat captain offering his vessel, but the message was not acted on. The first local police patrol arrived at 17:55, but despite guidelines recommending an immediate response to gun attacks the two officers did not try to find a boat. The officers received instructions to get an overview of the situation and await an anti-terror unit instead of finding a boat and crossing to Utøya themselves in order confront the gunman. An 11-strong elite Delta force team from Oslo arrived 14 minutes later, but after their own overloaded simple rubber dinghy broke down they were forced to abandon it for two civilian boats and landed on Utøya at 18:27. According to the commission, if procedures had been respected, police could have been on the island by 6.15 pm, or 12 minutes earlier, which could possibly have spared lives though the commission did not say as much. But Gjørv said that with better communication and individual decision making police near Utøya could have got to the island by 6pm and preventing an additional 25 minutes of slaughter. "The authorities' ability to protect the people on Utøya island failed. A more rapid police operation was a realistic possibility. The perpetrator could have been stopped earlier on 22 July," the commission said.

The Norwegian Police Security Service could have detected Breivik earlier "with better ways of working and a broader focus", the commission said. Breivik might have been stopped seven months before the attacks, had Norway's internal intelligence service, the PST, acted on a tip from customs officials who flagged a suspicious purchase of potential bomb-making chemicals from Poland, but intelligence service failures meant he was not put on a watch list. The special commission said that although the PST could have become aware of Breivik before 22 July, but said there were "no grounds for contending that the Police Security Service could and should have averted the attacks." Gjørv said a more effective response to warnings about Breivik would have revealed that he had been buying semiautomatic assault rifles and frequenting far-right Web sites. By December 2010, Breivik had already bought several semi-automatic assault rifles and was, said Gjørv, "highly visible on websites which must be called extreme". "Could he have been stopped?" she asked. "We can’t know for sure."

The report criticized Norway's gun controls as "inadequate," even though "Norway is a country with a large number of weapons." There was also praise for the government's communication with the public and the report said it was satisfied that health services had responded effectively.

== Commission recommendations ==
The commission came up with 31 recommendations ranging from better preparedness to limiting the availability of semi-automatic weapons and improving police helicopter capacity. The commission called, for example, for a "robust police helicopter service" to be set up in the Oslo police district and improvements in shift patterns for police officers, too many of whom were just working office hours. It also recommended that semiautomatic weapons be banned and Norwegian legislation on confidentiality be revised. The commission also called for introducing stricter control of arms and chemicals and making it "punishable to receive terrorist training".

== Reactions and post-report publication developments ==
Norwegian Prime Minister Jens Stoltenberg said after receiving the Gjørv Report he deeply regretted the mistakes that had been made and took responsibility for what had happened but stopped short of saying there would be ministerial resignations. "It took too long to apprehend the perpetrator and the police should have been on Utøya earlier. This is something I regret," he said. He also said: "It is not possible for a commission report to change what happened on July 22 last year. Nevertheless, the report is very important... because it gives us facts and knowledge - an understanding of what happened" Chief of police Øystein Mæland said that he accepted the main findings of the report, saying it was "difficult reading for all who did their utmost on that day". "But it is hardest for those who have heard that their loved ones could have been rescued had the police response worked better," he added. Opposition politicians, including Erna Solberg of the Conservatives and Knut Hareide of the Christian Democrats, expressed surprise about the frank tone in the report. Trond Henry Blattmann, the head of a 22 July support group who lost his son in the shooting, said it was "tough" to hear the conclusions of the commission, but noted that the bereaved wanted to know.

Norway's police chief Øystein Mæland resigned on 16 August 2012. Mæland said that he could no longer continue in the job without Justice Minister Grete Faremo confidence. "If the ministry and other political authorities do not clarify this matter unequivocally, it will become impossible for me to continue," he said in a statement with reference to the Gjørv Report which criticised the "unacceptable" amount of time which police took to respond to the shootings and an earlier police report which concluded that none of the officers on duty had hesitated in carrying out their duties.

Norway's prime minister Jens Stoltenberg apologised for failings in the authorities' response to the 2011 Norway attacks and took responsibility for mistakes. "We can never correct mistakes made in the past, but we can learn from the past," he told parliamentarians. "And to do that we must create a more secure future." Stoltenberg promised a raft of new anti-terror measures and announced new measures to improve security, including providing police with military helicopters, boosting funds for the police and improving emergency exercises at all levels of "public administration". The prime minister announced funding for a new emergency center for the Oslo police intended to centralize assets such as helicopters, the emergency squad and the canine unit. He also proposed devoting more money for emergency drills, improving the military's capacity to assist police, and protecting sensitive locations, but didn't set a timetable for changes.

The Dagbladet reported on 28 August 2012 that sharpshooters could use police helicopter contrary to what the police said after 22 July attacks. After the attacks Oslo police said clearly that snipers cannot shoot from the helicopter. But Oslo police's own contingency plans opened for several years to allow sharpshooters firing from the police's own surveillance helicopter. Sharpshooters of the police helicopter was part of contingency plans already in 2009, but according to the management of the Oslo police was removed in 2011 before the attacks. Oslo police spokesperson wrote in an e-mail to the NRK that the use of a sniper in the police helicopter was only one ambition of police and it was dropped when it became apparent that the helicopter was unsuitable for that purpose.
