= Gunnar Bovim =

Norwegian physician and civil servant

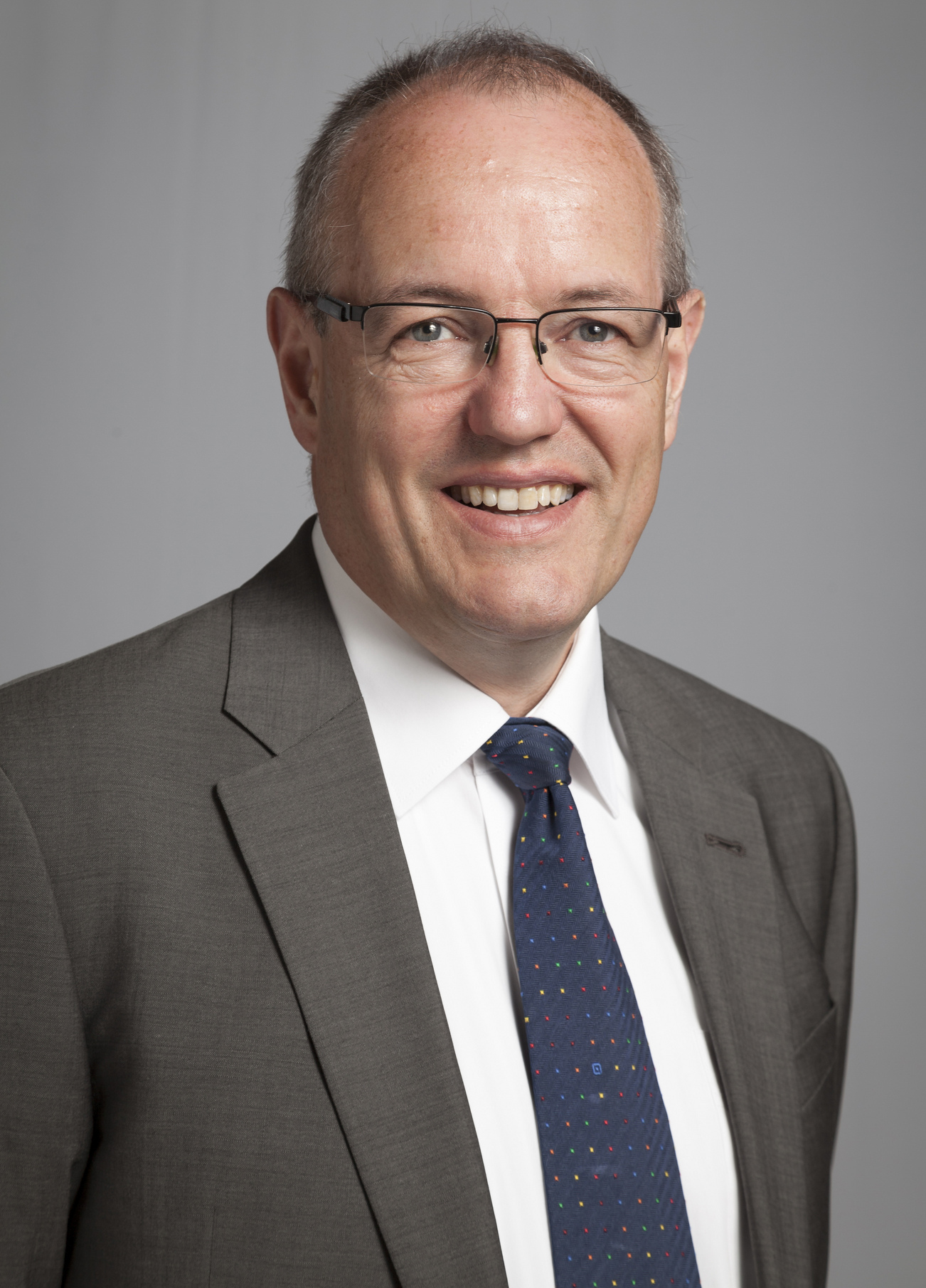
- Born: February 2, 1960 (age 66); Norway Bergen
- Education: Dr.med. (1993); Cand.med. (1985)
- Occupations: Rector of Norwegian University of Science and Technology; Professor in Neurology

Gunnar Bovim (born 2 February 1960) is a Norwegian physician and civil servant. He has been the rector at the Norwegian University of Science and Technology from August 1, 2013 to August 21, 2019. After that he will be working with policy matters related to education and research at NTNU and be of disposal to NTNUs top management.

== Career ==
He hails from Nesttun, and took his cand.med. degree at the University of Bergen in 1985. He took the dr.med. degree at the University of Trondheim in 1993 and became a specialist in neurology in the same year. He worked at the University of Trondheim, later the Norwegian University of Science and Technology after a merger. He was awarded a research prize from the Norwegian Migraine Society in 1993, and received a Dr. Ragnar Forberg scholarship in 1995. He became chief physician and professor of neurology at NTNU's Faculty of Medicine in 1998, was vice dean from 1996 to 1998 and dean of the Faculty of Medicine from 1999 to 2005. He was also head of the medical technology strategic area at NTNU from 2000 to 2005.

At the time, some held him as a good candidate for rector, but Bovim rejected such a job offer twice. In the period 2001–2003 he was also a board member of the Central Norway Regional Health Authority. He took a position as the deputy managing director of St. Olavs Hospital in Trondheim in 2005, and became managing director in 2006.

He started as the CEO of the Central Norway Regional Health Authority in 2009. He accepted the position as rector at the Norwegian University of Science and Technology in December 2012, and officially assumed the post on 1 August 2013.

Bovim has been criticized by the Norwegian Association of Researchers for not being present in his job as Rector, and for pursuing too many appointments outside academia.

He has also been criticized for his role in the "Eikrem-case" at NTNU.

Academic offices
Preceded by	Dean of the Faculty of Medicine, Norwegian University of Science and Technology; 1999–2005	Succeeded by Stig Arild Slørdahl
Preceded by Torbjørn Digernes	Rector of Norwegian University of Science and Technology; 2013–present	Incumbent
Civic offices
Preceded by Roar Arntzen	Chief executive of St. Olav Hospital; 2006–2009	Succeeded by Nils Kvernmo
Preceded by Bjørn Erikstein	Chief executive of the Central Norway Regional Health Authority; 2009–2013	Succeeded by Trond Michael Andersen
