= Roar Arntzen =

Norwegian engineer (1947–2026)

Roar Arntzen (23 November 1947 – 5 June 2026) was a Norwegian engineer.

== Life and career ==
Arntzen grew up in Rosenborg and Byåsen, and took the siv.ing. degree at the Norwegian Institute of Technology in his hometown. He was hired as a researcher in SINTEF in 1971, an institute for technical and industrial research. In 1977 he was hired as a chief engineer in Autronica, where he served five years as chief executive from 1984 to 1989, when he became director of the SINTEF company Elab-Runit. He advanced further to vice chief executive of SINTEF in 1991 and chief executive in 1995. He was first acting chief executive for some months before being hired on a permanent basis in November 1995. In March 2002 he was announced as the new chief executive of St. Olav Hospital. He resigned in March 2006, and was succeeded by Gunnar Bovim.

He chaired Renholdsverket and Trondheim Symphony Orchestra. Arntzen was a member of the gentlemen's club Harmonien. He was a fellow of the Norwegian Academy of Technological Sciences.

As of 2020, he sat on the board of directors for five companies and later served as the director of Trondheim Parkering, a parking company.

Arntzen died on 5 June 2026, at the age of 78.

Preceded by Thor O. Olsen	Chief executive of SINTEF; 1995–2002	Succeeded by Morten Loktu
Preceded by Valborg Sund	Chief executive of St. Olav Hospital; 2002–2006	Succeeded by Gunnar Bovim
