= Alle Kvinners Blad =

Defunct women's magazine in Norway (1937–1978)

- Former editors: Toppen Bech
- Categories: Women's magazine
- Frequency: Weekly
- Circulation: 275,000 (1950)
- Publisher: Gyldendal
- Founded: 1937
- Final issue: 1978
- Country: Norway
- Based in: Oslo
- Language: Norwegian

Alle Kvinners Blad (Norwegian: Every Woman's Magazine) is a former Norwegian language weekly magazine published between 1937 and 1978 in Oslo, Norway.

== History and profile ==
Alle Kvinners Blad was established in 1937 by the publishing house Gyldendal Norsk Forlag. The magazine was published on a weekly basis. In 1963 the name of the magazine was changed to Alle kvinner. The magazine was owned by the publishing house Nordisk Forlag from 1974 to 1978, when it ceased publication. Its last editor was Toppen Bech.

== Circulation ==
The circulation of Alle Kvinners Blad reached a peak of 275,000 copies in 1950, making it the second best-selling weekly magazine in Norway at the time.
