= Morten Loktu =

Norwegian businessperson (born 1960)

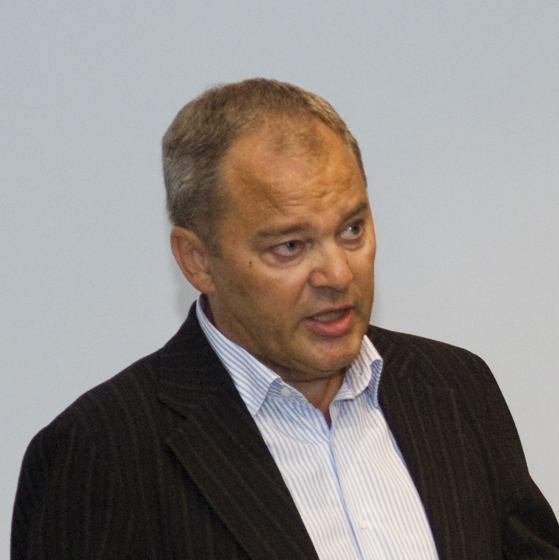

Morten Loktu (born 18 September 1960) is a Norwegian businessperson.

He took the siv.ing. degree at the Norwegian Institute of Technology in 1984, and was hired as an engineer in Statoil in 1985. Since then he has been a director in the company, except for the years 2002 to 2004, when he was the chief executive of SINTEF.

He is chairman of the board of OG21, and a board member of the Norwegian University of Science and Technology and of the European Institute of Innovation and Technology.

He is a fellow of the Norwegian Academy of Technological Sciences.

Preceded by Roar Arntzen	Chief executive of SINTEF; 2002–2004	Succeeded by Unni Steinsmo
