= Unni Steinsmo =

Norwegian chemical engineer and research executive

- Born: 15 March 1954 (age 72); Levanger Municipality, Norway
- Education: Norwegian Institute of Technology
- Occupations: chemical engineer and research executive
- Employer: SINTEF
- Known for: Research director and chief executive of SINTEF

Unni Steinsmo (born 15 March 1954) is a Norwegian chemical engineer and research executive. She was chief executive of SINTEF from 2004 to 2015.

== Biography ==
Steinsmo was born in Levanger Municipality on 15 March 1954. She graduated as chemical engineer from the Norwegian Institute of Technology, and as Doctor of Engineering degree in materials science in 1987.

An associate professor at the Norwegian University of Technology, she was appointed research director at SINTEF from 1997 to 2003, and was Chief executive officer from 2004 to 2015. She has been a board member of Research Council of Norway, and member of the European Research Advisory Board.

Academic offices
Preceded by Morten Loktu	Chief executive of SINTEF; 2004–2015	Succeeded by Alexandra Bech Gjørv
