= Stig Arild Slørdahl =

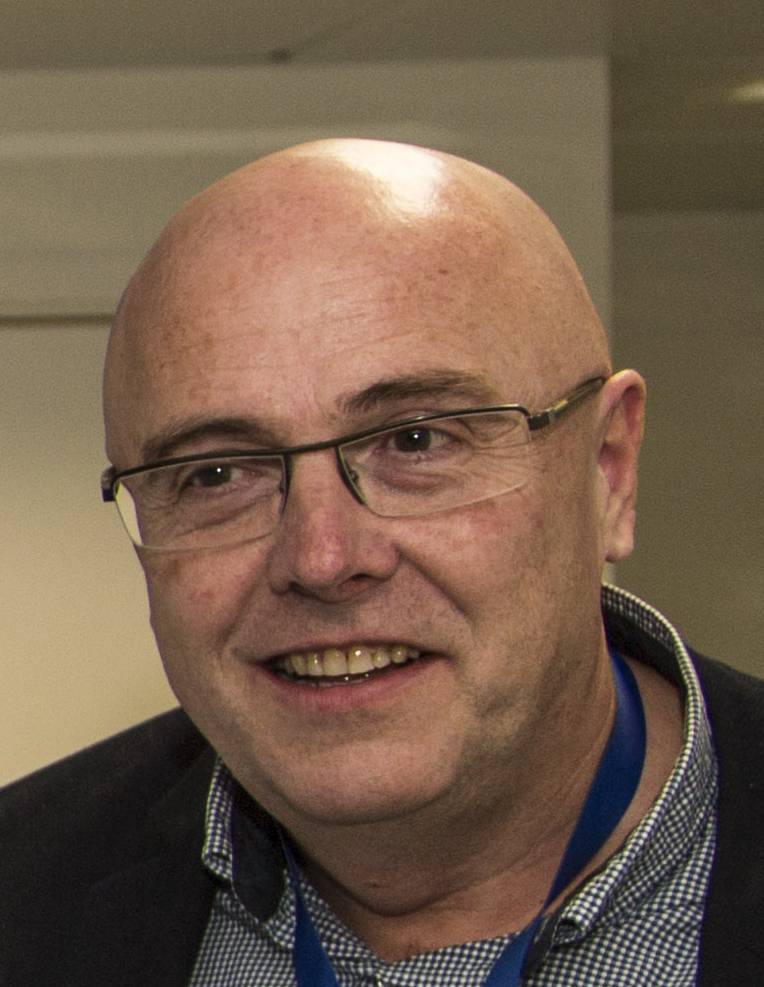
- Slørdahl in 2014 (Photographer: Henrik Fjørtoft / NTNU Communication Division)
- Born: March 6, 1959 (age 66); Kristiansund, Norway
- Education: Dr.med. (1992); Cand.med. (1985)
- Occupations: Dean at the Faculty of Medicine at the Norwegian University of Science and Technology (NTNU) attending physician at St. Olavs Hospital in Trondheim

Stig Arild Slørdahl (born 6 March 1959) was Managing Director of the Central Norway Regional Health Authority.

He has a background as a Norwegian professor of Medicine and specialist in Internal Medicine and Cardiology. He has been dean at the Faculty of Medicine at the Norwegian University of Science and Technology (NTNU) and attending physician at St. Olavs Hospital in Trondheim.

Slørdahl's research background is in cardiac ultrasound and physical training of cardiac patients. He was chair of The Joint Committee of the Nordic Medical Research Councils (NOS-M) 2010-2012 and member of the European Medical Research Councils Core Group 2009-2012. He is now chairing the Scientific Review Group for the Biomedical Sciences in European Science Foundation and has been a member of the board of Division for Science at The Research Council of Norway. He has also been member of the board of SINTEF and The Cancer Registry of Norway.

Slørdahl has led the work to establish The Norwegian Myocardial Infarct Registry.

In 2024 Slørdahl left his position as director of Helse-Midt Norge after implementation of a new journal system. The system raised strong criticism from both politicians, healthcare workers and The Office of the Auditor General of Norway. Its said that the system has put the citizens at high risk.

== Selected publications ==
- List of publications by Stig Arild Slørdahl in BIBSYS (Norway)
- List of publications by Stig Arild Slørdahl in CRIStin
