= Alexandra Bech Gjørv =

Norwegian lawyer and businesswoman (born 1965)

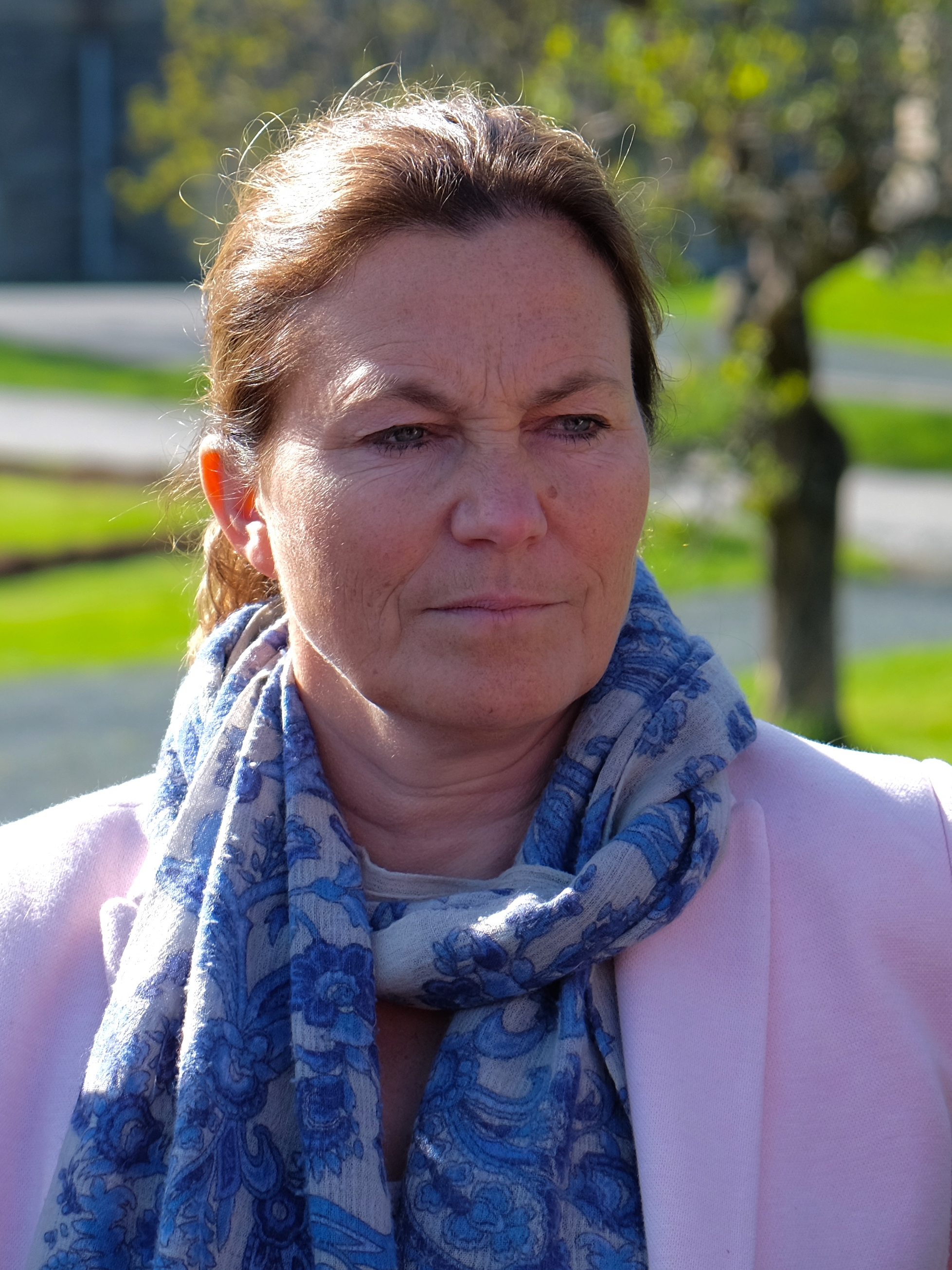
- Born: 13 September 1965 (age 60)
- Education: University of Oslo; University of Oxford; Suffolk University
- Occupations: Lawyer and businesswoman
- Notable work: Gjørv Report
- Mother: Toppen Bech
- Relatives: Inger Lise Gjørv (mother-in-law)

Alexandra Bech Gjørv (born 13 September 1965) is a Norwegian lawyer and businesswoman. She has been chief executive of SINTEF since 2016.

== Early and personal life ==
Born on 13 September 1965, Gjørv is the daughter of journalist Toppen Bech. She is married to Espen Gjørv, and a daughter-in-law of politician Inger Lise Gjørv.

== Career ==
Gjørv graduated as cand.jur. in 1990 from the University of Oslo, received further education at the University of Oxford (1991) and the Suffolk University in Boston (1993), and passed the New York State Bar Exam in 1994.

She was assigned with Norsk Hydro from 1993 to 2007, and with Statoil from 2007 to 2010. She chaired the governmental commission appointed after the 2011 Norway attacks, which presented their findings in the Gjørv Report. In 2015 she was appointed chief executive of SINTEF, succeeding Unni Steinsmo from January 2016.

Preceded by Unni Steinsmo	Chief executive of SINTEF since 2016	Succeeded by incumbent
