= Nils Anders Røkke =

Norwegian scientist and business leader (born 1963)

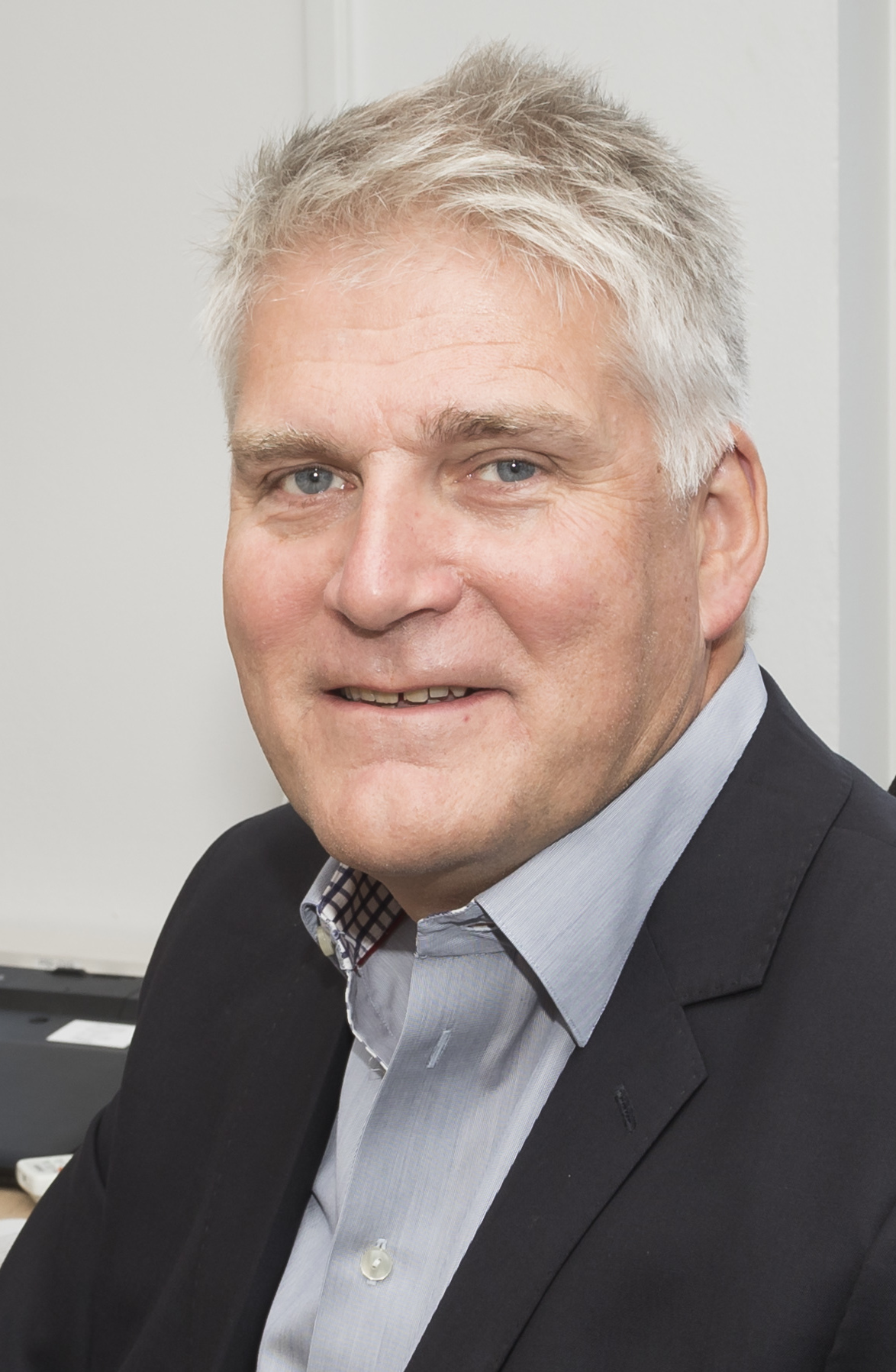
- Born: 10 April 1963 (age 62)
- Education: Norwegian University of Science and Technology; Msc.(ME), PhD
- Occupations: scientist, business leader
- Known for: promoter of sustainable solutions in energy and mobility
- Notable work: Executive Vice President Sustainability SINTEF, Chairman of The European Energy Research Alliance

Nils Anders Røkke (born 10 April 1963) is a Norwegian scientist and business leader. He is the Executive Vice President Sustainability SINTEF. He is as of May 2017 the Chairman of The European Energy Research Alliance. EERA is the public research pillar of the EU Strategic Energy Technology Plan(SET-Plan). The SET-Plan aims at accelerating the development and market uptake of key low carbon technologies. EERA brings together more than 170 research centres and universities, working together on 17 joint research programmes, they build on national research initiatives.

Nils A. Røkke is a promoter of sustainable solutions in energy and mobility, especially in the Norwegian public debate and on the European research arena. His research interests are in energy and climate strategies, renewable energy, CCS technologies and policies, climate mitigation and the European energy research community.

He has a Msc. in Mechanical Engineering from NTNU from 1986. He has a PhD in Thermal Energy and combustion from NTNU from 1994. He worked as Gas Turbine Design and Development Manager in Rolls-Royce Marine from 1998, before returning to SINTEF in 2002. He has been the coordinator of several large European CCS projects in FP6 and FP7, as well as NORDICCS, a CCS research project funded by the Nordic Top Level Research Initiative.

He is the Chair of ECCSEL, the European CCS Lab infrastructure. He is the standing chairman and originator of the Trondheim CCS conferences (TCCS). From 2020. Røkke joined the contributor network at Forbes, writing regular columns on the business of energy.

== Selected publications ==
- List of publications by Nils Anders Røkke in BIBSYS (Norway)

List of publications by Nils Anders Røkke in CRIStin
