= SINTEF =

Norwegian research organization

Coordinates: 63°24′50″N 10°24′38″E

- Company type: Private
- Industry: Research
- Founded: 1950
- Headquarters: Trondheim, Norway
- Products: Research projects
- Operating income: 135,523 Norwegian krone (2022)
- Number of employees: 2000 (2017)
- Subsidiaries: SINTEF Community; SINTEF Energy Research; SINTEF Digital; SINTEF Industry; SINTEF Ocean; SINTEF TTO; SINTEF Helgeland; SINTEF Narvik; SINTEF Nord; SINTEF Nordvest; SINTEF Brussel
- Website: www.sintef.no

SINTEF (Norwegian: Stiftelsen for industriell og teknisk forskning, "The Foundation for Industrial and Technical Research"), headquartered in Trondheim, Norway, is an independent research organization founded in 1950 that conducts contract research and development projects. SINTEF has 2000 employees from 75 countries and annual revenues of three billion Norwegian kroner. SINTEF has a close partnership with Norwegian University of Science and Technology (NTNU), started in 1950 when SINTEF was founded. SINTEF has expertise in technology, medicine and the social sciences. Alexandra Bech Gjørv is the CEO of SINTEF, preceded by Unni Steinsmo, Morten Loktu and Roar Arntzen.

== History ==
SINTEF was established in 1950 by the Norwegian Institute of Technology (NTH), which was later merged into the Norwegian University of Science and Technology (NTNU). It was originally intended to be an arm of NTH extended towards industry, where professors at NTH saw opportunities to build up a mission research business and used SINTEF as an instrument to do that. Through 1980, the activities were organized as SINTEF departments with the local professor in charge. With that link to the university in mind, the full name was, until a statute change in 2008, the Company for industrial and technical research at the Norwegian Institute of Technology.

SINTEF had its strongest growth period in the 1970s, linked to the growing technology demand in the Norwegian oil industry. Foreign oil companies were encouraged to add research activity to Norway, and NTH/SINTEF positioned itself well. This growth also gave the Trondheim region a boost as part of a "goodwill period" that lifted NTH/SINTEF to a high, international level in the technology area.

In 1980, SINTEF was transformed into an independent research foundation and professionalized as an organization. The old model with the NTH professor as SINTEF leaders ended, though some continued in dual roles, and SINTEF now had its own managers.

The SINTEF Group was established in the mid-1980s, when three new institutes were placed under the SINTEF umbrella. The Norwegian Ship Engineering Research Institute (MARINTEK), the Electricity Supply Research Institute (EFI) and the Institute for Continental Shelf Surveys (IKU) were transformed into joint stock companies with SINTEF as their largest owner. A fourth limited company, SINTEF Fisheries and Aquaculture, was established in 1999. SINTEF Byggforsk AS saw the light of day on 1 January 2006.

SINTEF maintains a close collaboration with the Norwegian University of Science and Technology (NTNU) in Trondheim. The cooperation includes, among other things, widespread common use of laboratories and equipment. NTNU personnel work on SINTEF projects, and SINTEF staff teach at NTNU. The collaboration also includes nearly 30 long-term research centers and the sharing of about 200 laboratories. In addition, SINTEF collaborates with the University of Oslo and other research environments in Norway and internationally.

SINTEF is certified according to ISO 9001: 2015, ISO 14001: 2015 and OHSAS 18001: 2007.

== Employees ==
Three out of four employees are researchers.

- 71% research scientists (56% of research scientists have a PhD)
- 13% managers and administrative personnel
- 9% engineers
- 7% technical personnel

Total of 2000 employees.

SINTEF scientists include Nils Anders Røkke, Håvard Fjær Grip and Torleiv Maseng.

== Commercialization ==
Commercialization of research results is part of SINTEF's social mission. This is done through the licensing and development of new companies, based on technology developed in the research activities. SINTEF TTO (Technology Transfer Office) commercializes research results through start-up and development of new companies, patenting and licensing of technology.

Below is a list of companies spun out from SINTEF.

- AblePay Technologies
- Biosergen
- Blue Impact
- BrainImage
- C-Feed
- Eelume AS
- FunzioNano
- Listen
- Marbileads
- Minuendo
- Nacre
- Nisonic
- Ocean Space Acoustics
- poLight
- RESMAN.no
- sensiBel
- SpinChip Diagnostics
- Tellu
- Veritrack
- Zivid

== Research ==
SINTEF is organized in the following 12 research domains:

- Building and construction
- Climate and Environment
- Digitalization
- Food and agriculture
- Health and medicine
- Materials
- Microsystems and nanotechnolgy
- Ocean space
- Renewable energy
- Society and security
- Sustainable production
- Transport and mobility

== See also ==
- CSIR, Ghana
- CSIR, India
- CSIR, South Africa
- CSIRO, Australia
- Fraunhofer Society, Germany
- TNO, Netherlands
